= National Register of Historic Places listings in York County, Maine =

Location of York County in Maine

York County, Maine, United States, has 185 properties and districts listed on the National Register of Historic Places, including five National Historic Landmarks. Another four properties were once listed but have been removed.

Latitude and longitude coordinates are provided for many National Register properties and districts; these locations may be seen together in a map.

This National Park Service list is complete through NPS recent listings posted June 6, 2026.

Contents: Counties and municipalities in Maine
Androscoggin - Aroostook - Cumberland (City of Portland) - Franklin - Hancock - Kennebec - Knox - Lincoln - Oxford - Penobscot - Piscataquis - Sagadahoc - Somerset - Waldo - Washington - York

== Current listings ==
	Name on the Register	Image	Date listed	Location	City or town	Description
1	Alfred Historic District	Alfred Historic District	April 28, 1983 (#83000479)	Kennebunk and Saco Rds. 43°28′24″N 70°42′58″W	Alfred	
2	Alfred Shaker Historic District	Alfred Shaker Historic District	April 11, 2001 (#01000371)	Both sides of Shaker Hill Rd. 43°29′55″N 70°42′41″W	Alfred	
3	Arundel Golf Club	Arundel Golf Club	November 4, 2009 (#09000879)	19 River Rd. 43°22′26″N 70°28′40″W	Kennebunkport	
4	Austin-Hennessey Homestead	Austin-Hennessey Homestead	December 27, 1979 (#79000171)	433 Branch Rd., at Burnt Mill Rd. 43°20′44″N 70°37′09″W	Wells	Also known as the Storer-Hennessey Homestead
5	Caleb R. Ayer House	Caleb R. Ayer House	October 31, 2002 (#02001270)	7 Main St. 43°48′16″N 70°48′15″W	Cornish	
6	Samuel Badger Monument	Samuel Badger Monument	January 7, 1998 (#97001640)	in a small graveyard behind 16 Otis Ave; 43°05′12″N 70°44′42″W	Kittery Foreside	
7	Barrell Homestead	Barrell Homestead	December 12, 1976 (#76000195)	71 Beech Ridge Rd. 43°08′41″N 70°42′28″W	York Beach	
8	Berwick Academy	Berwick Academy	March 29, 1978 (#78000336)	Academy St.; also along the eastern side of Academy St., 0.15 miles (0.24 km) south of its junction with State Route 236; 43°13′48″N 70°48′18″W	South Berwick	Second set of addresses represents a boundary increase March 22, 1996
9	Berwick High School	Berwick High School	January 27, 2012 (#11001059)	45 School St. 43°16′08″N 70°51′39″W	Berwick	Berwick's high school 1928-2001.
10	Biddeford City Hall	Biddeford City Hall	April 24, 1973 (#73000156)	205 Main St. 43°29′36″N 70°27′26″W	Biddeford	Rebuilt 1895-96, John Calvin Stevens, architect.
11	Biddeford Main Street Historic District	Biddeford Main Street Historic District	December 24, 2009 (#09001146)	29 to 316 Main St., and portions of Elm, Jefferson, Adams, Washington, Franklin, Alfred and Water Sts. 43°29′36″N 70°27′19″W	Biddeford	
12	Biddeford-Saco Mills Historic District	Biddeford-Saco Mills Historic District	December 30, 2008 (#08001258)	Bounded by Pearl, Lincoln, York and Main Sts., Biddeford, Gooch and Saco Sts.; also 1 and 30 Gooch St. 43°29′38″N 70°27′18″W	Biddeford	1 and 30 Gooch Street represent a boundary increase approved December 22, 2022.
13	Blazo-Leavitt House	Blazo-Leavitt House	February 19, 1982 (#82000791)	State Route 160; 43°45′43″N 70°56′24″W	Parsonsfield	
14	Boon Island Light Station	Boon Island Light Station	March 14, 1988 (#88000153)	Boon Island; 43°07′03″N 70°28′06″W	York	
15	Bourne Mansion	Bourne Mansion	January 24, 1980 (#80000381)	8 Bourne St. 43°23′12″N 70°32′26″W	Kennebunk	
16	Brave Boat Harbor Farm		October 30, 2007 (#07001153)	110 Raynes Neck Rd. 43°06′15″N 70°39′03″W	York	
17	Bray House	Bray House	October 9, 1979 (#79000271)	Pepperell Rd. 43°04′58″N 70°42′10″W	Kittery Point	
18	Isabella Breckinridge House		April 28, 1983 (#83000480)	201 U.S. Route 1; 43°08′27″N 70°41′18″W	York	
19	Royal Brewster House	Royal Brewster House	June 5, 1975 (#75000116)	Buxton Lower Corner; 43°36′22″N 70°32′09″W	Buxton	
20	Buxton Powder House	Buxton Powder House	January 2, 1976 (#76000120)	State Route 22; 43°38′54″N 70°32′47″W	Buxton Center	
21	Cape Arundel Summer Colony Historic District	Cape Arundel Summer Colony Historic District	August 16, 1984 (#84001549)	Roughly bounded by Chick's Creek, Ocean Ave., S. Main St., Endcliff Rd., and Walkers Point; 43°20′41″N 70°28′04″W	Kennebunkport	
22	Cape Neddick Light Station	Cape Neddick Light Station	April 16, 1985 (#85000844)	Cape Neddick; 43°09′55″N 70°35′30″W	York	
23	Capt. Josiah E. Chase Octagon House	Capt. Josiah E. Chase Octagon House	March 25, 1987 (#87000431)	Chase's Mill Rd. 43°43′39″N 70°39′40″W	East Limington	
24	George F. Clifford House	George F. Clifford House	April 22, 2010 (#10000230)	17 High Rd. 43°48′16″N 70°48′10″W	Cornish	
25	Clock Farm	Clock Farm	February 19, 1982 (#82000792)	State Route 9 and Goose Rocks Rd. 43°24′20″N 70°25′39″W	Kennebunkport	
26	Colonial Inn	Colonial Inn	July 31, 2012 (#12000454)	145 Shore Rd. 43°14′41″N 70°35′48″W	Ogunquit	
27	Conant-Sawyer Cottage	Conant-Sawyer Cottage	March 26, 1992 (#92000279)	14 Kendall Rd. 43°10′22″N 70°35′59″W	York Beach	
28	Conway Junction Railroad Turntable Site	Conway Junction Railroad Turntable Site	January 5, 1989 (#88003001)	Fife Ln. and State Route 236; 43°12′33″N 70°47′22″W	South Berwick	
29	Cummings' Guest House	Cummings' Guest House	July 28, 2004 (#04000744)	110 Portland Ave. 43°31′06″N 70°22′31″W	Old Orchard Beach	
30	Cummings Shoe Factory	Cummings Shoe Factory	December 31, 2001 (#01001420)	2 Railroad Ave. 43°14′14″N 70°49′18″W	South Berwick	
31	Benjamin and Abigail Dalton House	Benjamin and Abigail Dalton House	April 14, 1997 (#97000311)	Middle Rd east of the intersection with Merrill Hill Rd. 43°43′37″N 70°55′42″W	North Parsonsfield	Listed as "Address Restricted" in NRHP
32	J.G. Deering House	J.G. Deering House	February 17, 1982 (#82000793)	371 Main St. 43°30′08″N 70°26′36″W	Saco	
33	Dennett Garrison	Dennett Garrison	December 22, 1978 (#78000334)	100 Dennett Rd. 43°06′03″N 70°45′35″W	Kittery	
34	District No. 5 School	District No. 5 School	February 4, 2009 (#09000015)	781 Gore Rd. 43°31′27″N 70°45′56″W	Alfred	
35	Division No. 9 School	Division No. 9 School	December 14, 1995 (#95001463)	1760 N. Berwick Rd; southern side of State Route 9, 0.15 miles (0.24 km) east of its junction with Bragdon Rd. 43°18′23″N 70°41′27″W	Wells	
36	Dorfield Farm	Dorfield Farm	December 27, 1979 (#79000172)	16 Dorfield Lane, off Harrisecket Rd. 43°21′29″N 70°34′02″W	Wells	
37	Dudley Block	Dudley Block	November 12, 1982 (#82000428)	28-34 Water St. 43°29′32″N 70°27′01″W	Biddeford	
38	Early Post Office	Early Post Office	December 27, 1979 (#79000173)	88 Crossing Road (Bragdon's Crossing); 43°19′15″N 70°36′13″W	Wells	Also known as the Bragdon House
39	Eaton House	Eaton House	December 27, 1979 (#79000174)	Sanford Rd. 43°21′33″N 70°39′49″W	Wells	Listed as being in the North Berwick vicinity.
40	Elden's Store	Elden's Store	April 28, 1983 (#83000481)	State Route 22; 43°38′55″N 70°32′31″W	Buxton	
41	Elder Grey Meetinghouse	Elder Grey Meetinghouse	October 9, 1979 (#79000175)	North of North Waterboro; 43°38′10″N 70°42′50″W	North Waterboro	
42	Emery Homestead	Emery Homestead	June 22, 1980 (#80000379)	1 and 3 Lebanon St. 43°26′26″N 70°46′43″W	Sanford	
43	Emery House	Emery House	December 27, 1979 (#79000176)	2449 Sanford Rd. 43°21′56″N 70°40′10″W	Wells (Highpine)	
44	Emery School	Emery School	November 18, 2011 (#11000819)	116 Hill St. 43°29′19″N 70°27′15″W	Biddeford	
45	First Baptist Church	First Baptist Church	June 28, 1988 (#88000886)	Western side of the junction of West Rd. and Federal St. 43°32′16″N 70°44′12″W	Waterboro	
46	First Congregational Church and Parsonage	First Congregational Church and Parsonage	December 18, 1978 (#78000333)	Pepperrell Rd.; also along both sides of Whipple (Pepperell) Rd., 2.3 miles (3.7 km) east of its junction with U.S. Route 1; 43°04′54″N 70°42′56″W	Kittery Point	Second set of addresses represents a boundary increase
47	First Congregational Church of Buxton	First Congregational Church of Buxton	June 22, 1980 (#80000259)	State Route 112; 43°36′23″N 70°32′14″W	Buxton	
48	First Congregational Church, Former	First Congregational Church, Former	June 21, 1991 (#91000768)	938 Post Road; southwestern corner of U.S. Route 1 and Buzzell Rd. 43°18′05″N 70°35′12″W	Wells	Now a historical society museum.
49	First Parish Meetinghouse	First Parish Meetinghouse	October 26, 1972 (#72000080)	Old Pool Rd. 43°28′31″N 70°24′56″W	Biddeford	
50	James Montgomery Flagg House	James Montgomery Flagg House	April 23, 1980 (#80000260)	St. Martin's Lane; 43°27′00″N 70°20′38″W	Biddeford	
51	Fletcher's Neck Lifesaving Station	Fletcher's Neck Lifesaving Station	November 1, 1974 (#74000195)	Ocean Ave. 43°26′33″N 70°20′33″W	Biddeford Pool	
52	William Fogg Library	William Fogg Library	December 21, 1991 (#91001817)	Old Rd. 43°07′42″N 70°47′53″W	Eliot	
53	Fort McClary	Fort McClary	October 1, 1969 (#69000025)	Off State Route 103 near Fort McClary State Park; 43°04′54″N 70°42′39″W	Kittery Point	
54	Levi Foss House	Levi Foss House	March 22, 1984 (#84001550)	State Route 35; 43°30′40″N 70°34′54″W	Goodwins Mills	
55	Frank C. Frisbee Elementary School	Frank C. Frisbee Elementary School	April 25, 2012 (#12000229)	120 Rogers Rd. 43°05′51″N 70°44′11″W	Kittery	
56	Frost Garrison and House	Frost Garrison and House	June 27, 1971 (#71000045)	Frost's Hill (Garrison Dr.); 43°09′42″N 70°44′56″W	Eliot	
57	Goat Island Light Station	Goat Island Light Station	March 23, 1988 (#87002268)	Goat Island in Cape Porpoise Harbor; 43°21′28″N 70°25′33″W	Cape Porpoise	
58	Goodale-Bourne Farm	Goodale-Bourne Farm	December 27, 1979 (#79000177)	N. Village Rd. 43°15′48″N 70°38′05″W	Ogunquit	
59	Goodale-Stevens Farm	Goodale-Stevens Farm	December 27, 1979 (#79000178)	N. Village Rd. 43°15′49″N 70°37′54″W	Ogunquit	
60	Louis B. Goodall Memorial Library	Louis B. Goodall Memorial Library	January 24, 2008 (#07001448)	952 Main St. 43°26′10″N 70°46′24″W	Sanford	
61	Goodall Worsted Company Alpaca Mill No. 2 - Jagger Brothers Mill	Goodall Worsted Company Alpaca Mill No. 2 - Jagger Brothers Mill	December 29, 2025 (#100012452)	5 Water Street; 43°28′04″N 70°47′49″W	Sanford	
62	Thomas Goodall House	Thomas Goodall House	April 28, 1975 (#75000207)	near 938 Main St. 43°26′15″N 70°46′24″W	Sanford	
63	Edmund E. Goodwin House	Edmund E. Goodwin House	November 9, 2015 (#15000770)	503 Main St. 43°27′48″N 70°47′45″W	Sanford	
64	Grant Family House	Grant Family House	June 21, 1990 (#90000927)	72 Grant Rd. 43°34′47″N 70°30′15″W	Saco	
65	Abbott Graves House	Abbott Graves House	April 23, 1980 (#80000261)	Ocean Ave. 43°21′14″N 70°28′22″W	Kennebunkport	
66	Great Falls Manufacturing Company Newichawannock Canal Historic District	Great Falls Manufacturing Company Newichawannock Canal Historic District	August 6, 2014 (#14000460)	Between Great East Lake and Horn Pond; 43°34′10″N 70°58′16″W	Acton	Extends into Wakefield in Carroll County, New Hampshire
67	Grist Mill Bridge	Grist Mill Bridge	December 27, 1990 (#90001905)	Little River Rd. across the Little River; 43°23′30″N 70°51′06″W	Lebanon	
68	Jonathan Hamilton House	Jonathan Hamilton House	December 30, 1970 (#70000082)	Vaughan's Lane and Old South Rd. 43°12′48″N 70°48′47″W	South Berwick	
69	John Hancock Warehouse	John Hancock Warehouse	December 2, 1969 (#69000029)	136 Lindsay Rd. 43°08′12″N 70°39′28″W	York	
70	Harper Family House	Harper Family House	October 8, 1998 (#98001236)	State Route 5, approximately 0.95 miles (1.53 km) south of its junction with E. Range Rd. 43°40′07″N 70°46′33″W	Limerick	
71	Hatch House	Hatch House	December 27, 1979 (#79000179)	2104 Sanford Rd. 43°21′32″N 70°39′53″W	Wells	Listed as being in the "North Berwick vicinity".
72	Hawkes Pharmacy	Hawkes Pharmacy	October 14, 1993 (#93001111)	6 Main St. 43°10′33″N 70°36′40″W	York Beach	Also known as the Rockaway Hotel
73	Hedden Site		October 16, 1991 (#91001515)	Address Restricted	Kennebunk	
74	Thomas Hobbs Jr. House	Thomas Hobbs Jr. House	February 11, 1982 (#82000794)	Wells St. 43°18′19″N 70°44′17″W	North Berwick	
75	Sen. John Holmes House	Sen. John Holmes House	April 24, 1975 (#75000117)	U.S. Route 202; 43°28′39″N 70°43′04″W	Alfred	
76	William Dean Howells House	William Dean Howells House	October 25, 1979 (#79000270)	Pepperrell Rd. 43°04′51″N 70°42′45″W	Kittery Point	
77	Mary R. Hurd House	Mary R. Hurd House	September 11, 1979 (#79000180)	Elm St. 43°18′19″N 70°44′22″W	North Berwick	
78	Hussey Plow Company Building	Hussey Plow Company Building	December 19, 1979 (#79000181)	Dyer St. 43°18′15″N 70°43′45″W	North Berwick	
79	Isles of Shoals	Isles of Shoals	May 16, 1974 (#74000325)	6.5 miles (10.5 km) southeast of Kittery; 42°59′43″N 70°36′23″W	Kittery	
80	Jacobs Houses and Store	Jacobs Houses and Store	March 2, 1982 (#82000795)	9-17 Elm St. 43°29′56″N 70°27′02″W	Saco	
81	Sarah Orne Jewett House	Sarah Orne Jewett House	June 4, 1973 (#73000248)	State Routes 4 and 236; 43°14′05″N 70°48′13″W	South Berwick	
82	Jewett-Eastman House	Jewett-Eastman House	December 29, 1983 (#83003700)	37 Portland St. 43°14′06″N 70°48′33″W	South Berwick	Now the visitors center for the Sarah Orne Jewett House
83	Dennis Johnson Lumber Company Mill	Dennis Johnson Lumber Company Mill	May 8, 2007 (#07000409)	Northeastern side of State Route 5, 0.3 miles (0.48 km) north of Silas Brown Rd. 43°37′09″N 70°43′56″W	Waterboro	
84	John Paul Jones Memorial Park	John Paul Jones Memorial Park	January 7, 1998 (#97001639)	Bounded by Newmarch St. and Hunter Ave. 43°05′06″N 70°45′02″W	Kittery Foreside	
85	Kennebunk High School	Kennebunk High School	August 24, 2011 (#11000584)	14 Park St. 43°23′07″N 70°32′06″W	Kennebunk	The town's old high school, built 1921-22.
86	Kennebunk Historic District	Kennebunk Historic District	June 5, 1974 (#74000324)	Both sides of State Route 35 from the Kennebunk River to U.S. Route 1, radiating streets at intersection 43°22′55″N 70°31′24″W	Kennebunk	
87	Kennebunk River Club	Kennebunk River Club	September 9, 1975 (#75002169)	Ocean Ave. 43°21′01″N 70°28′24″W	Kennebunkport	Frederick W. Stickney, architect.
88	Kennebunkport Historic District	Kennebunkport Historic District	May 6, 1976 (#76000121)	Bounded roughly by South, Maine, North, and Locke Sts., and the Kennebunk River; 43°21′46″N 70°28′33″W	Kennebunkport	Contributing properties include Melville Walker House
89	Kezar Falls Circulating Library		December 8, 2021 (#100007254)	2 Wadleigh St. 43°48′23″N 70°53′10″W	Parsonsfield	
90	Lady Pepperrell House	Lady Pepperrell House	October 15, 1966 (#66000094)	State Route 103; 43°04′53″N 70°43′00″W	Kittery Point	
91	Laudholm Farm	Laudholm Farm	October 20, 1983 (#83003702)	342 Laudholm Rd. 43°20′14″N 70°33′05″W	Wells	
92	James Leavitt House	James Leavitt House	September 22, 2004 (#04001051)	6 Old Alfred Rd. 43°35′20″N 70°42′34″W	Waterboro Center	
93	Libby's Colonial Tea Room	Libby's Colonial Tea Room	January 19, 2001 (#99000769)	Junction of U.S. Route 1 and Harrisecket Rd. 43°21′26″N 70°33′32″W	Wells	Now houses the Johnson Hall Museum.
94	Libby-MacArthur House	Libby-MacArthur House	April 20, 1988 (#88000397)	State Route 11; 43°43′54″N 70°42′39″W	Limington	
95	Limerick Upper Village Historic District	Limerick Upper Village Historic District	April 5, 1984 (#84001557)	State Route 5; 43°41′17″N 70°47′43″W	Limerick	
96	Limington Academy	Limington Academy	June 23, 1980 (#80000380)	State Route 117; 43°44′N 70°43′W	Limington	
97	Limington Historic District	Limington Historic District	January 15, 1999 (#98001601)	Junction of State Routes 11 and 117; 43°43′57″N 70°42′33″W	Limington	
98	Lincoln School	Lincoln School	April 23, 2013 (#13000189)	8 Orchard Rd. 43°29′29″N 70°54′40″W	Acton	
99	Littlefield Homestead	Littlefield Homestead	December 27, 1979 (#79000182)	1458 Branch Rd, near Chick's Crossing Rd. 43°22′30″N 70°35′52″W	Wells	
100	Littlefield Tavern	Littlefield Tavern	December 27, 1979 (#79000186)	1107 Littlefield Rd; 43°18′N 70°38′W	Wells	
101	Littlefield-Chase Farmstead	Littlefield-Chase Farmstead	December 27, 1979 (#79000183)	State Route 9, 1485 N. Berwick Rd. 43°18′28″N 70°40′44″W	Wells	
102	Littlefield-Dustin Farm	Littlefield-Dustin Farm	December 27, 1979 (#79000184)	41 Dodge Rd. 43°18′33″N 70°41′15″W	Wells	
103	Littlefield-Keeping House	Littlefield-Keeping House	December 27, 1979 (#79000185)	1673 Littlefield Rd. 43°18′27″N 70°39′52″W	Wells	
104	Lord Farm	Lord Farm	December 27, 1979 (#79000187)	317 Laudholm Rd. 43°20′11″N 70°33′06″W	Wells	
105	Lord Mansion	Lord Mansion	April 2, 1973 (#73000158)	20 Summer St. 43°23′12″N 70°32′01″W	Kennebunk	
106	Capt. Nathaniel Lord Mansion	Capt. Nathaniel Lord Mansion	September 20, 1973 (#73000157)	Pleasant and Green Sts. 43°21′32″N 70°28′27″W	Kennebunkport	
107	Lord-Dane House	Lord-Dane House	December 17, 1992 (#92001708)	Western side of Federal St., 2 miles (3.2 km) north of its junction with U.S. Route 202; 43°29′57″N 70°43′47″W	Alfred	
108	Lower Alewive Historic District	Lower Alewive Historic District	March 24, 1994 (#94000178)	Northern side of Winnow Hill Ln, Emmons Rd. Ext., Russell Farm Rd., east of its junction with State Route 35; 43°25′51″N 70°33′49″W	Kennebunk	
109	Maine Trolley Cars	Maine Trolley Cars	November 14, 1980 (#80000262)	Seashore Trolley Museum; 43°24′28″N 70°29′22″W	Kennebunkport	Includes ten cars in the collection of the Seashore Trolley Museum.
110	Marginal Way	Marginal Way	March 23, 2022 (#100007535)	Waterfront pedestrian path between 65 Perkins Rd. to 93 Shore Rd. 43°14′35″N 70°35′21″W	Ogunquit	
111	McIntire Garrison House	McIntire Garrison House	November 24, 1968 (#68000017)	280 Cider Hill Rd. 43°10′05″N 70°42′49″W	York	
112	Memorial Chapel	Memorial Chapel	June 20, 2018 (#100002594)	55 Cemetery Rd. 43°17′14″N 70°51′28″W	Berwick	In Evergreen Cemetery
113	Mill House	Mill House	December 27, 1979 (#79000188)	502 Post Rd. 43°17′16″N 70°35′39″W	Wells	Listed as being in Ogunquit.
114	Moody Homestead	Moody Homestead	April 28, 1975 (#75000209)	100 Ridge Rd. 43°09′23″N 70°38′02″W	York	
115	Capt. James Morison House	Capt. James Morison House	July 12, 1978 (#78000335)	Southeast of Parsonsfield on South Rd. 43°41′30″N 70°52′49″W	Parsonsfield	
116	Morrell House	Morrell House	September 29, 1976 (#76000194)	North of N. Berwick on Bauneg Beg Pond Rd. 43°21′21″N 70°44′20″W	North Berwick	
117	Newfield (Willowbrook) Historic District	Newfield (Willowbrook) Historic District	February 14, 1985 (#85000275)	Elm St. 43°39′18″N 70°51′07″W	Newfield	
118	North Berwick Woolen Mill	North Berwick Woolen Mill	July 21, 1983 (#83000482)	Canal St. 43°18′16″N 70°44′15″W	North Berwick	
119	Ocean Park Historic Buildings	Ocean Park Historic Buildings	March 2, 1982 (#82000796)	Temple Ave. 43°30′20″N 70°23′22″W	Ocean Park	
120	Odd Fellows-Rebekah Hall	Odd Fellows-Rebekah Hall	December 29, 1983 (#83003704)	High St. 43°48′14″N 70°48′12″W	Cornish	
121	Ogunquit Memorial Library	Ogunquit Memorial Library	December 29, 1983 (#83003706)	166 Shore Rd. 43°14′38″N 70°35′48″W	Ogunquit	
122	Ogunquit Playhouse	Ogunquit Playhouse	December 14, 1995 (#95001458)	10 Main Street (U.S. Route 1); 43°14′20″N 70°36′02″W	Ogunquit	
123	Old Grist Mill	Old Grist Mill	June 5, 1975 (#75000118)	Little River Rd. 43°23′31″N 70°51′05″W	East Lebanon	
124	Old Schoolhouse	Old Schoolhouse	April 2, 1973 (#73000247)	3 Lindsay Rd. (on the Village Green); 43°08′38″N 70°39′13″W	York	
125	Old Town House	Old Town House	July 15, 2002 (#02000785)	Merrill Hill Rd., north of its junction with Middle Rd. 43°43′42″N 70°55′47″W	Parsonsfield	
126	Old York Gaol	Old York Gaol	November 24, 1968 (#68000016)	193 York St; 43°08′38″N 70°39′10″W	York	
127	Parsons-Piper-Lord-Roy Farm	Parsons-Piper-Lord-Roy Farm	February 15, 2005 (#05000054)	309 Cramm Rd. 43°42′34″N 70°50′47″W	Parsonsfield	
128	Parsonsfield Seminary	Parsonsfield Seminary	June 20, 1986 (#86001339)	State Route 160; 43°45′46″N 70°56′20″W	Parsonsfield	
129	Paul Family Farm	Paul Family Farm	October 20, 1998 (#98001232)	106 Depot Rd. 43°09′22″N 70°47′25″W	Eliot	
130	Pebbledene	Pebbledene	October 14, 1993 (#93001110)	99 Freeman St. 43°10′51″N 70°36′19″W	York Beach	
131	William Pepperrell House	William Pepperrell House	August 14, 1973 (#73000159)	On State Route 103; 43°04′59″N 70°42′13″W	Kittery Point	
132	Charles Perkins House	Charles Perkins House	December 27, 1979 (#79000189)	Scotch Hill; 43°15′13″N 70°36′08″W	Ogunquit	
133	LeRoy F. Pike Memorial Building	LeRoy F. Pike Memorial Building	February 7, 2007 (#07000010)	17 Maple St. 43°48′21″N 70°48′22″W	Cornish	
134	Porter-Parsonfield Bridge	Porter-Parsonfield Bridge	February 16, 1970 (#70000058)	0.5 miles (0.80 km) south of Porter over the Ossipee River; 43°47′30″N 70°56′18″W	Parsonsfield	Extends into Oxford County
135	Portsmouth Company Cotton Mills: Counting House	Portsmouth Company Cotton Mills: Counting House	October 10, 1975 (#75000208)	State Route 4 at the Salmon Falls River; 43°13′37″N 70°48′41″W	South Berwick	Now the museum for the Old Berwick Historical Society.
136	Portsmouth Naval Shipyard	Portsmouth Naval Shipyard	November 17, 1977 (#77000141)	Seavey's Island; 43°04′59″N 70°44′18″W	Kittery	
137	J.L. Prescott House	J.L. Prescott House	June 20, 1985 (#85001268)	High St. 43°18′39″N 70°44′19″W	North Berwick	
138	Rendezvous Point Burying Ground		December 8, 2021 (#100007255)	South side of Ferry Rd., between Meadow and Lewis Lns. 43°28′47″N 70°24′21″W	Saco	
139	Rice Public Library	Rice Public Library	October 1, 1979 (#79000190)	8 Wentworth St. 43°05′12″N 70°44′34″W	Kittery	
140	Rock Rest	Rock Rest	January 24, 2008 (#07001449)	167 Brave Boat Harbor Rd. 43°06′20″N 70°40′34″W	Kittery	
141	Robert Rose Tavern	Robert Rose Tavern	October 10, 1975 (#75000206)	298 Long Sands Rd. 43°09′14″N 70°37′40″W	York	
142	Saco Central Fire Station	Saco Central Fire Station	April 16, 2013 (#13000168)	14 Thornton Ave. 43°29′56″N 70°26′47″W	Saco	
143	Saco City Hall	Saco City Hall	October 9, 1979 (#79000192)	300 Main St. 43°29′57″N 70°26′44″W	Saco	
144	Saco High School (old)	Saco High School (old)	July 14, 1983 (#83000483)	Spring St. 43°30′09″N 70°26′21″W	Saco	
145	Saco Historic District	Saco Historic District	June 12, 1998 (#98000594)	Roughly bounded by Elm, North, Beach, and Main Sts. 43°30′10″N 70°26′51″W	Saco	
146	St. Andre's Parish	St. Andre's Parish	November 10, 2015 (#15000771)	73, 77 Bacon & 39, 41 Sullivan Sts. 43°29′25″N 70°27′02″W	Biddeford	
147	St. Joseph's School	St. Joseph's School	December 29, 1983 (#83003708)	Birch St. 43°29′25″N 70°27′31″W	Biddeford	
148	St. Peter's By-The-Sea Protestant Episcopal Church	St. Peter's By-The-Sea Protestant Episcopal Church	July 1, 1999 (#99000773)	529 Shore Rd. 43°13′04″N 70°35′03″W	York (Cape Neddick)	
149	Salmon Falls (East) Historic District	Salmon Falls (East) Historic District	October 15, 1987 (#87001859)	Portions of State Route 117 and Simpson Rd. 43°35′34″N 70°33′04″W	Buxton	
150	Salmon Falls (West) Historic District	Salmon Falls (West) Historic District	October 30, 1987 (#87001858)	Salmon Falls Rd. and portion of U.S. Route 202; 43°35′53″N 70°33′24″W	Hollis	
151	Sanford Mills Historic District	Sanford Mills Historic District	November 4, 2009 (#09000880)	Bounded by Washington St., Pioneer Ave., Emery St., and Weaver Dr. 43°26′24″N 70°46′17″W	Sanford	
152	Sanford Town Hall (Former)	Sanford Town Hall (Former)	January 9, 2007 (#06001225)	505 Main St. 43°27′48″N 70°47′44″W	Springvale	
153	A. B. Seavey House	A. B. Seavey House	March 31, 1978 (#78000332)	90 Temple St. 43°30′03″N 70°27′00″W	Saco	
154	John Sedgley Homestead	John Sedgley Homestead	January 2, 1976 (#76000192)	44 Chases Pond Rd. 43°09′53″N 70°40′02″W	York Beach	
155	James Smith Homestead	James Smith Homestead	February 4, 1982 (#82001887)	State Route 35; 43°25′56″N 70°33′54″W	Kennebunk	
156	Smith-Emery House	Smith-Emery House	October 8, 1998 (#98001233)	253 Main St. 43°28′07″N 70°48′07″W	Springvale	
157	South Berwick Village Historic District	South Berwick Village Historic District	March 2, 2010 (#10000058)	Portions of Main, Portland, Highland and Academy; 43°13′57″N 70°48′31″W	South Berwick	
158	Spiller Farm Paleoindian Site	Spiller Farm Paleoindian Site	September 12, 2003 (#03000922)	on the Spiller Farm property 43°21′54″N 70°36′18″W	Wells	
159	Stage Island Monument	Stage Island Monument	August 28, 2019 (#100004341)	NE of Hills Beach on Stage Island, .6 mi. N of mouth of Biddeford Pool; 43°27′24″N 70°21′05″W	Biddeford	
160	Staples Inn	Staples Inn	June 26, 1987 (#86002422)	8 Portland Ave. 43°31′03″N 70°22′42″W	Old Orchard Beach	
161	Summer Street Block		June 7, 2024 (#100010444)	1-11 Summer Street; 43°29′26″N 70°27′21″W	Biddeford	
162	Sunnycroft	Sunnycroft	November 8, 1984 (#84000335)	Locust Hill; 43°41′22″N 70°47′40″W	Limerick	
163	John Tarr House	John Tarr House	April 23, 1980 (#80000263)	29 Ferry Lane; 43°28′09″N 70°23′54″W	Biddeford	
164	The Temple	The Temple	April 28, 1975 (#75000119)	Temple Ave. in Ocean Park; 43°30′08″N 70°23′22″W	Old Orchard Beach	
165	Thacher-Goodale House	Thacher-Goodale House	November 21, 1976 (#76000193)	121 North St. 43°30′19″N 70°26′47″W	Saco	
166	Timber Point	Timber Point	November 15, 2016 (#16000786)	2 Timber Point Rd., Rachel Carson National Wildlife Refuge; 43°23′56″N 70°23′51″W	Biddeford	
167	Robert and Louisa Traip House	Robert and Louisa Traip House	January 7, 1998 (#97001641)	2 Wentworth St. 43°05′11″N 70°44′35″W	Kittery Foreside	
168	U.S. Customhouse	U.S. Customhouse	January 18, 1974 (#74000323)	Main St. 43°21′42″N 70°28′32″W	Kennebunkport	Now Graves Library.
169	U.S. Post Office	U.S. Post Office	May 7, 1973 (#73000161)	35 Washington St. 43°29′32″N 70°27′21″W	Biddeford	
170	US Post Office-Sanford Maine	US Post Office-Sanford Maine	May 2, 1986 (#86000882)	28 School St. 43°26′16″N 70°46′22″W	Sanford	
171	Richard Vines Monument		January 11, 2022 (#11000781)	56 Bridge Rd. 43°26′14″N 70°22′18″W	Biddeford	
172	Wallingford Hall	Wallingford Hall	April 28, 2004 (#04000372)	21 York St. 43°22′57″N 70°32′48″W	Kennebunk	
173	Waterboro Grange, No. 432	Waterboro Grange, No. 432	April 24, 2012 (#12000230)	31 West Rd. 43°32′12″N 70°43′04″W	Waterboro	
174	Way Way General Store	Way Way General Store	December 14, 1995 (#95001462)	93 Buxton Rd. 43°31′57″N 70°28′21″W	Saco	
175	Andrew Welch Homestead	Andrew Welch Homestead	April 11, 2002 (#02000352)	1286 Middle Rd. 43°42′47″N 70°53′22″W	Parsonsfield	
176	Wells Baptist Church Parsonage	Wells Baptist Church Parsonage	December 27, 1979 (#79000191)	1384 Branch Rd (State Route 9A); 43°22′27″N 70°35′58″W	Wells	
177	Wells Homestead	Wells Homestead	December 27, 1979 (#79000193)	232 Sanford Rd. 43°19′21″N 70°35′10″W	Wells	
178	Mark F. and Eliza J. Wentworth House	Mark F. and Eliza J. Wentworth House	January 7, 1998 (#97001643)	9 Wentworth St. 43°05′12″N 70°44′36″W	Kittery Foreside	
179	West Lebanon Historic District	West Lebanon Historic District	June 5, 1975 (#75000210)	Irregular pattern along W. Lebanon, Rochester, Milton, Shapleigh, and Meeting House Rds. 43°23′03″N 70°57′04″W	West Lebanon	
180	Whaleback Light Station	Whaleback Light Station	March 23, 1988 (#87002278)	Portsmouth Harbor; 43°03′31″N 70°41′48″W	Kittery Point	
181	Kate Douglas Wiggin House	Kate Douglas Wiggin House	September 16, 1977 (#77000142)	East of Hollis Center on Salmon Falls Rd. 43°35′50″N 70°33′20″W	Hollis Center	
182	Winn House	Winn House	December 27, 1979 (#79000194)	Obed's Lane; 43°14′41″N 70°36′01″W	Ogunquit	Moved in the 1980s; now a local museum
183	Wood Island Light Station	Wood Island Light Station	January 21, 1988 (#87002274)	Eastern side of Wood Island; 43°27′24″N 70°19′47″W	Biddeford Pool	
184	York Cliffs Historic District	York Cliffs Historic District	July 26, 1984 (#84001560)	Agamenticus Ave. 43°11′31″N 70°35′56″W	York	A series of summer "cottages" on Agamenticus Ave.
185	York Historic District	York Historic District	July 16, 1973 (#73000249)	Roughly U.S. Route 1, U.S. Route 1A, State Route 103, and Woodbridge Rd. 43°08′18″N 70°39′03″W	York	

== Former listings ==
	Name on the Register	Image	Date listed	Date removed	Location	City or town	Description
1	First Parish Congregational Church		June 14, 1990 (#90000921)	January 15, 2004	12 Beach Street; 43°30′03″N 70°26′33″W	Saco	Destroyed by fire in 2000.
2	Gerrish Warehouse	Gerrish Warehouse	May 26, 1977 (#77000140)	September 29, 2015	Pepperrell Cove off State Route 103; 43°04′52″N 70°43′06″W	Kittery	Demolished.
3	Perkins Tide Mill	Perkins Tide Mill	September 7, 1973 (#73000160)	March 21, 2023	Mill Lane; 43°22′01″N 70°28′28″W	Kennebunkport	Destroyed by arsonist in 1994.
4	Sanford Naval Air Station Administration Building-Control Tower, Former	Sanford Naval Air Station Administration Building-Control Tower, Former	June 20, 1997 (#97000603)	March 21, 2023	Southwestern corner of Sanford Municipal Airport, southwest of the junction of State Routes 99 and 109; 43°23′25″N 70°43′00″W	South Sanford	Demolished c. 2006-7.

== See also ==
- List of National Historic Landmarks in Maine
- National Register of Historic Places listings in Maine
