= Robert and Louisa Traip House =

Historic house in Maine, United States

- U.S. National Register of Historic Places
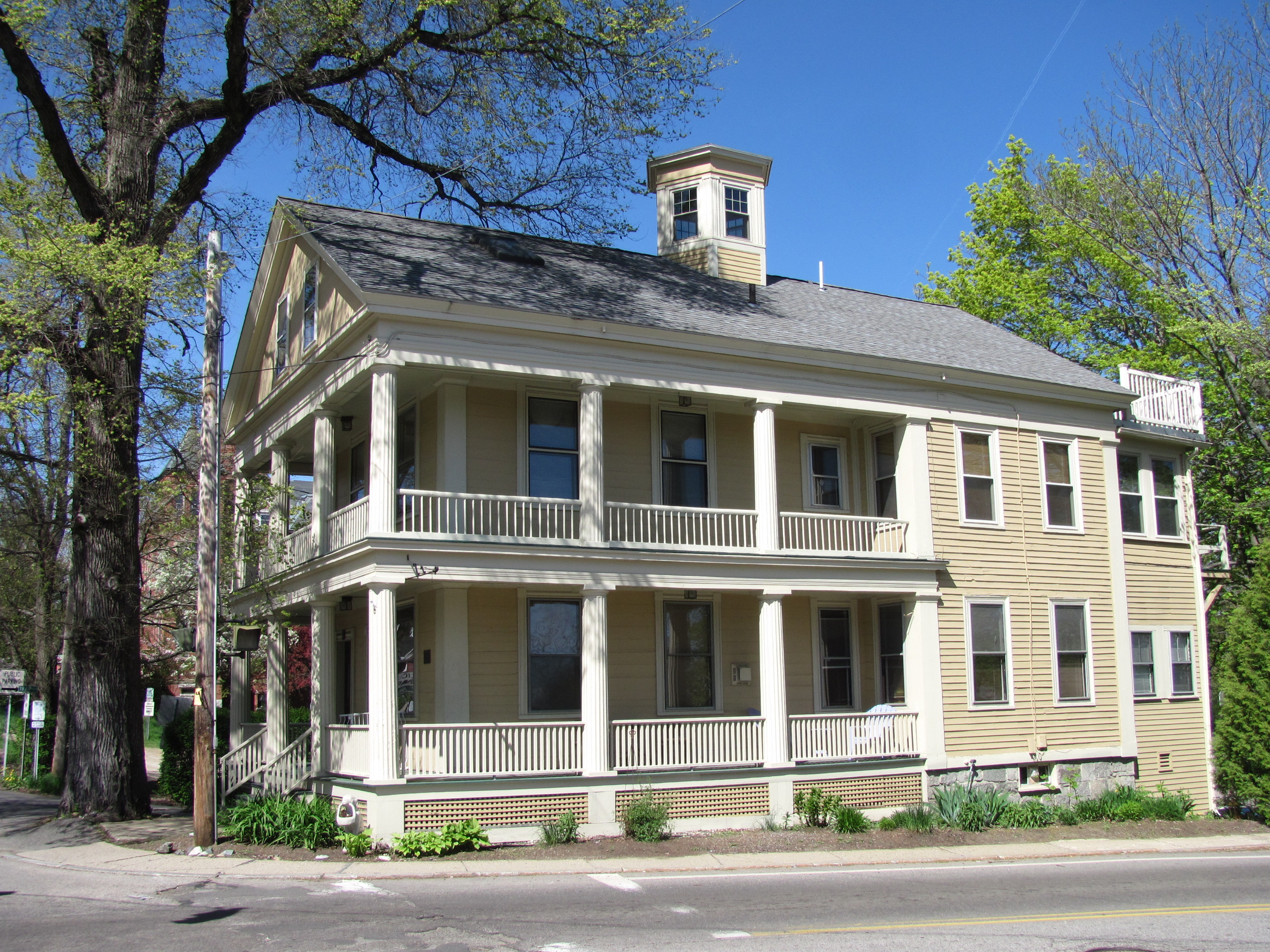

- Location within Maine Location within the United States
- Location: 2 Wentworth St., Kittery Foreside, Maine
- Coordinates: 43°5′11″N 70°44′35″W
- Area: 9 acres (3.6 ha)
- Built: 1839
- Architectural style: Greek Revival
- NRHP reference No.: 97001641
- Added to NRHP: January 7, 1998

The Robert and Louisa Traip House is a historic house at 2 Wentworth Street (Maine State Route 103) in Kittery, Maine. Built about 1839, it is a rare statewide example of a Greek Revival house with colonnaded sides. Robert Traip, its first owner, was one of Kittery's wealthiest men at the time. The house was listed on the National Register of Historic Places in 1998.

== Description and history ==
The Traip House is set in the village of Kittery Foreside, on the east side of Wentworth Street, between Traip Avenue and Walker Street. It is a 2 1/2-story wood-frame structure, with a gable roof, flushboard and clapboard siding, and a granite foundation. The roof is capped by a small octagonal cupola. A two-story porch extends across the front and partially along both sides of the house, supported by fluted Doric columns. An entablature extends around the building just below the roof, and the front gable is fully pedimented, with a pair of sash windows in the center. The area under the porch is finished in flushboard, while that outside is clapboarded. The buildings corners are accentuated by pilasters. The interior retains original Greek Revival door and window trim.

The land on which the house was built was purchased in 1838 by Robert Traip, and the house is presumed to have been built on it soon afterward. The house is the one of only two known in the state from the Greek Revival period to have a three-sided two-story colonnade. Traip, member of a locally prominent family, is described in surviving records as a "gentleman", with a net worth in excess of $20,000. One of Kittery's wealthiest residents, he bequested funds for the establishment of a local academy.

== See also ==
- National Register of Historic Places listings in York County, Maine
