= Cummings Shoe Factory =

- U.S. National Register of Historic Places
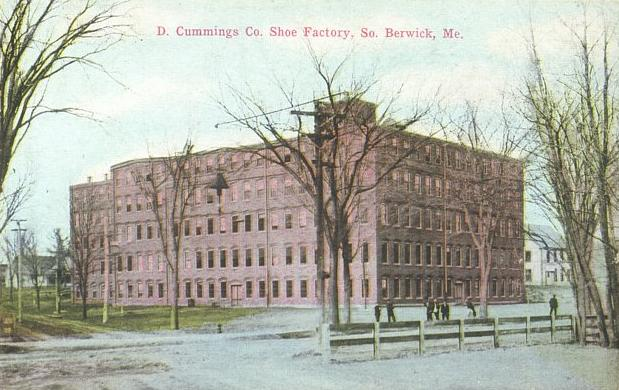

- Location within Maine Location within the United States
- Location: 2 Railroad Avenue, South Berwick, Maine
- Coordinates: 43°14′14″N 70°49′18″W
- Area: 3 acres (1.2 ha)
- Built: 1871
- Architectural style: Italianate
- NRHP reference No.: 01001420
- Added to NRHP: December 31, 2001

The Cummings Shoe Factory is a historic former factory building at 2 Railroad Avenue in South Berwick, Maine. Built in 1871, it house one of the town's major businesses until the 1990s, and as since been converted to residential use. The building was listed on National Register of Historic Places on December 31, 2001.

== Description and history ==
The Cummings Shoe Factory is located at the northern corner of Railroad Avenue and Norton Street, just north of the village center of South Berwick. The area it is set in is predominantly residential. It is an imposing five-story brick structure, now roughly U-shaped. Its oldest portion is an L-shaped structure facing the corner, with a square tower rising an additional story from the crook of the L. A large addition to the west made it into a rough U shape, and this was further extended to the north in the 1930s.

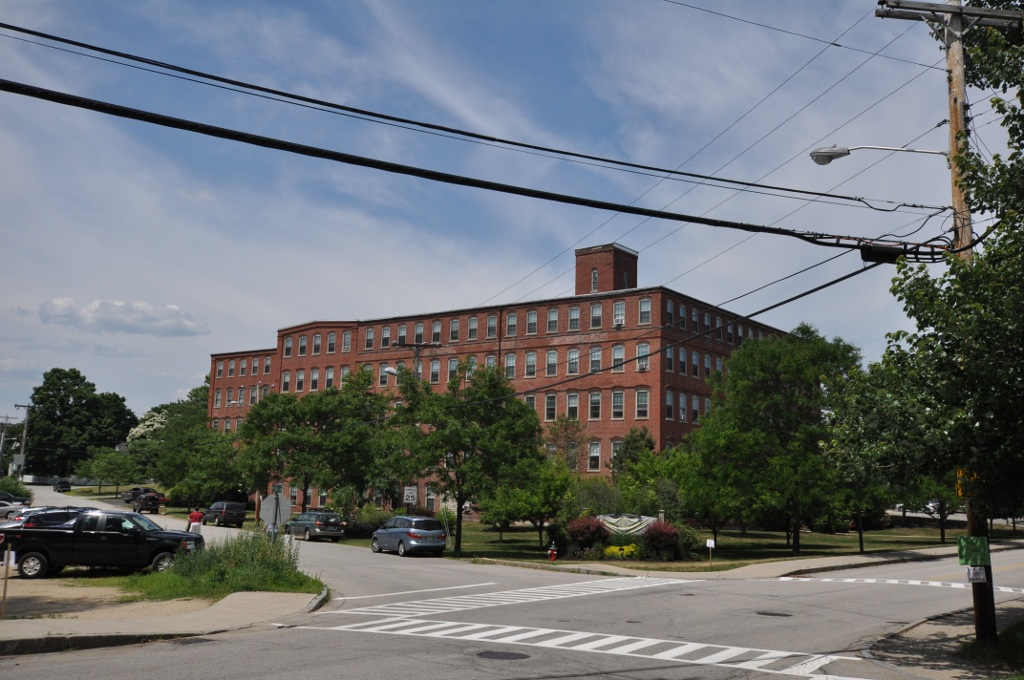
The factory in 2014

The factory was established in 1871, and became an economic mainstay of the community for more than 120 years, closing its doors in 1993. It was an exception to the typical model for shoe factories in Maine, which were often built by public subscription and leased out to out-of-state firms. This factory was founded by David Cummings of Worcester, Massachusetts, partly in response to increasing labor organization in Massachusetts. In addition to the main factory building, the complex included a large number of ancillary buildings for related operations such as tanning; all of these have since been demolished. The Cummingses, a family operation, ran the factory until 1929, after which it was operated for a time on the more common leasing model. Its last industrial owner was foreclosed in 1993, and the town acquired the property in 1995. It now contains 48 housing units.

== See also ==
- National Register of Historic Places listings in York County, Maine
