= Wallingford Hall =

Historic house in Maine, United States

- U.S. National Register of Historic Places
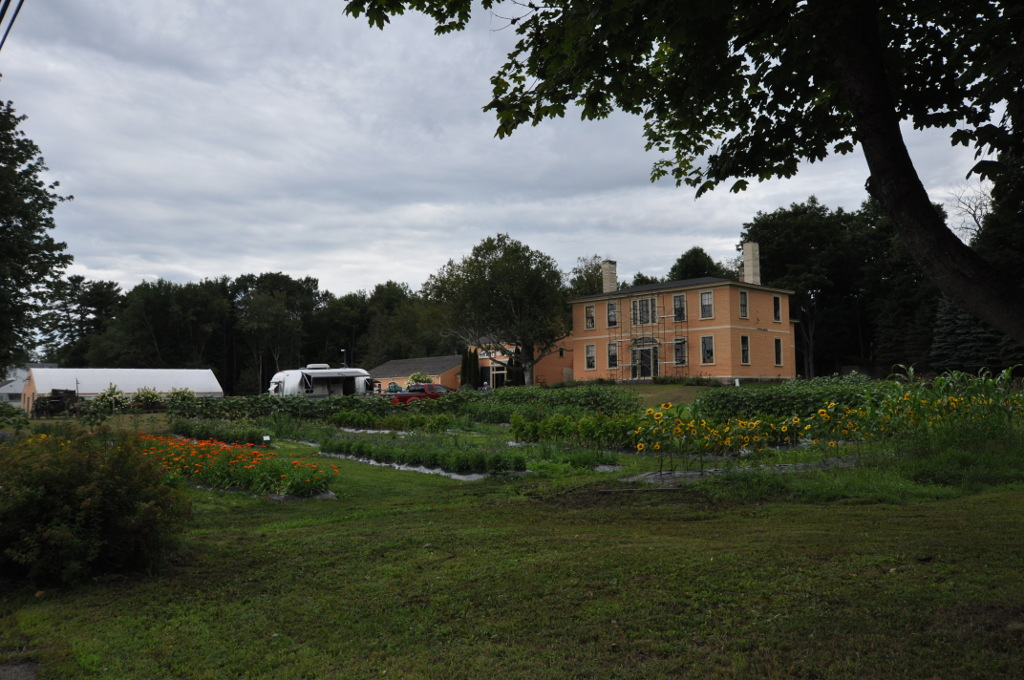

- Location within Maine Location within the United States
- Location: 21 York St., Kennebunk, Maine
- Coordinates: 43°22′57″N 70°32′48″W
- Area: 3.9 acres (1.6 ha)
- Built: 1804
- Architect: Eaton, Thomas
- Architectural style: Federal
- NRHP reference No.: 04000372
- Added to NRHP: April 28, 2004

Wallingford Hall is a historic house at 21 York Street (United States Route 1) in Kennebunk, Maine. Built in 1805–06, it is an unusually grand expression of Federal architecture in the town, built by the regionally architect and builder Thomas Eaton, and one of the oldest surviving examples in the state of a connected farmstead. In the late 19th and early 20th century it was also home to William Barry, an architectural historian who wrote extensively on the architecture of southern Maine, and was an early promoter of the Colonial Revival in the area. The house was listed on the National Register of Historic Places in 2004.

== Description and history ==
Wallingford Hall is set on a 4-acre (1.6 ha) property on the north side of York Street, near the western edge of Kennebunk's village center. The main house is a 2 1/2-story wood-frame structure, five bays wide, with a hip roof, end chimneys, clapboard siding, and a granite foundation. The roof is ringed by a low wooden balustrade. The front (south-facing) facade is slightly asymmetrical, with the entrance at the center, with flanking sidelight windows and a leaded semi-oval fanlight window above. A flat-topped three-part Palladian window is set above the entrance, while the remaining windows are sash. The floors are separated by a band of flushboarding. A two-story ell extends to the north, and is joined to a six-bay carriage shed that extends west to a 19th-century barn, which is further joined to a modern barn by a short hyphen connector.

Wallingford Hall was built between 1804 and 1806 by Thomas Eaton for George Wallingford, a successful local lawyer. Eaton was a regionally prominent builder, whose documented surviving work stretches from York to Portland and is recognized for its high quality Federal style. Wallingford was a leading local citizen, serving on the constitutional convention of 1816 at which the Maine constitution was adopted, as well as in local offices and the state legislature. Wallingford's family retained ownership of the house until 1933. Its last owner of that family was William Barry, a noted local architect and architectural historian. He had detailed plans made of Wallingford Hall in 1882, and was influential in reviving interest in Colonial architectural styles in a number of high-profile architectural firms for which he worked. His 1874 "Pen Sketches of Old Houses" is believed to be the first study of historic American architecture.

== See also ==
- National Register of Historic Places listings in York County, Maine
