= Colonial Inn (Ogunquit, Maine) =

Historic place in Maine, United States

- U.S. National Register of Historic Places
- U.S. Historic district
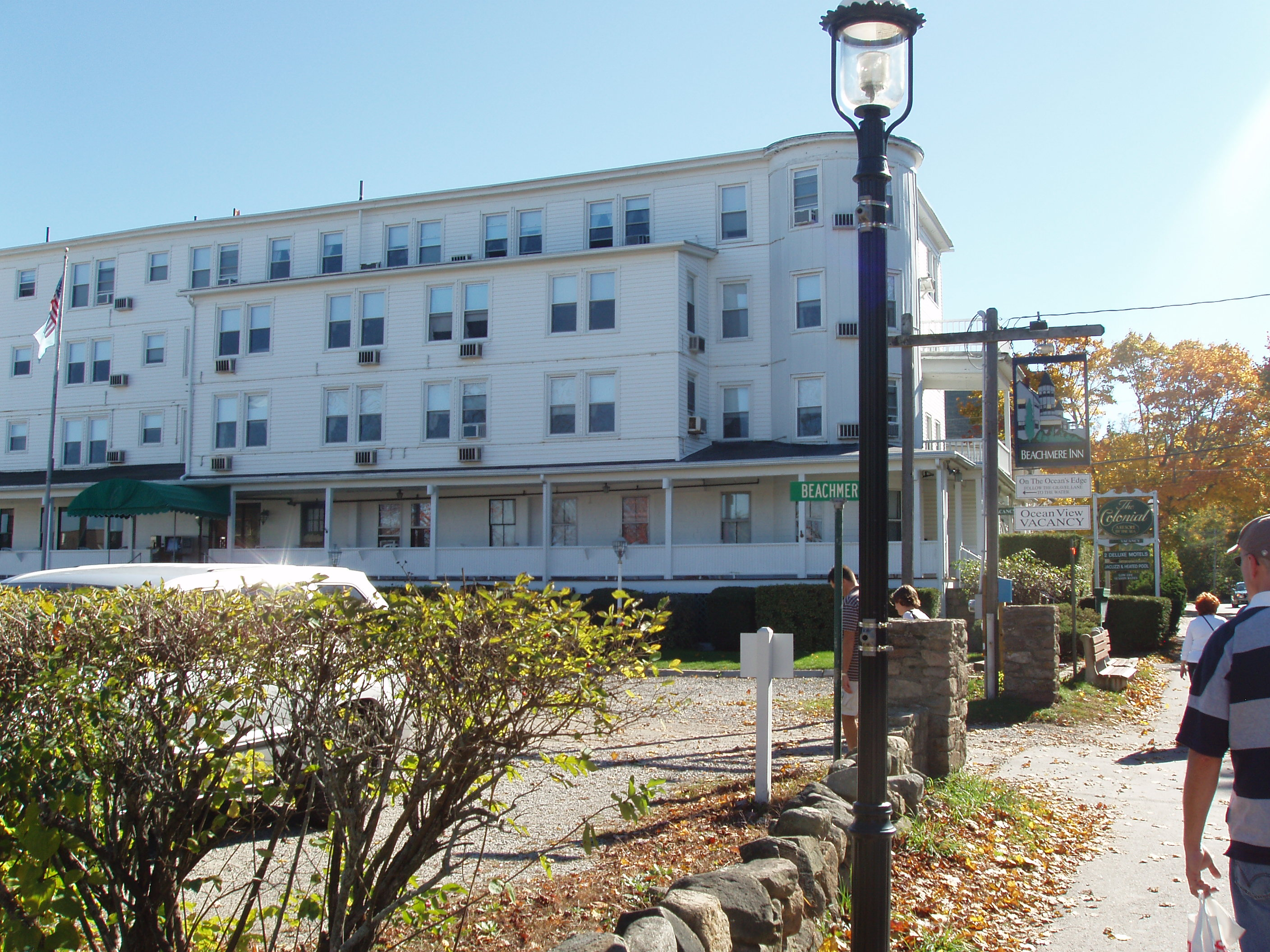

- Location within Maine Location within the United States
- Location: 145 Shore Rd., Ogunquit, Maine
- Coordinates: 43°14′41″N 70°35′48″W
- Area: 1.5 acres (0.61 ha)
- Built: 1897
- Architectural style: Queen Anne
- NRHP reference No.: 12000454
- Added to NRHP: July 31, 2012

The Colonial Inn is a historic hotel at 145 Shore Road in Ogunquit, Maine. The hotel complex is anchored by an 1890 Queen Anne Victorian hotel that is one of the few surviving resort hotels of the period, and is listed on the National Register of Historic Places. The complex also has rooms in adjacent motel spaces; its amenities include a swimming pool, game room, and dining room serving breakfast.

== Architecture and history ==
The Colonial Inn is located on an L-shaped property bordered on the west by Shore Road and the north by Beachmere Lane. The Ogunquit Baptist Church stands south of the main hotel building, in the crook of the L. The main hotel building is a long, roughly rectangular, four-story wood-frame structure whose long side faces Beachmere Lane. A single-story porch extends along the length of this facade, which has a projecting three-story section near its center, and a rounded section at the northeast corner. The origins of this building lie in a c. 1850 Greek Revival residence, which was repeatedly extended and enlarged between the 1880s and c. 1920.

Extending southward from the eastern end of the main hotel (behind the church, as seen from Shore Road) is a modern two-story motel block, built in 1983. To the east of this building, near its southern end, stands a second two-story motel structure, oriented east–west, that was built about 1961. Just north of that is a c. 1900 Shingle style cottage, 1 1/2 stories in height, that faces eastward toward the ocean. This house was originally the residence of the hotel proprietor. The hotel swimming pool is located just east of the main hotel and north of the 1983 motel block.

The hotel is historically significant because it is the only surviving 19th-century hotel in Ogunquit that still serves as a hotel and retains its historic appearance. Other hotels of the period have either been converted to condominiums or (like the neighboring Beachmere) been engulfed by modern alterations. The Colonial Inn property encapsulates an architectural history of tourist accommodations in the area.

== See also ==
- National Register of Historic Places listings in York County, Maine
