= A. B. Seavey House =

Historic house in Maine, United States

- U.S. National Register of Historic Places
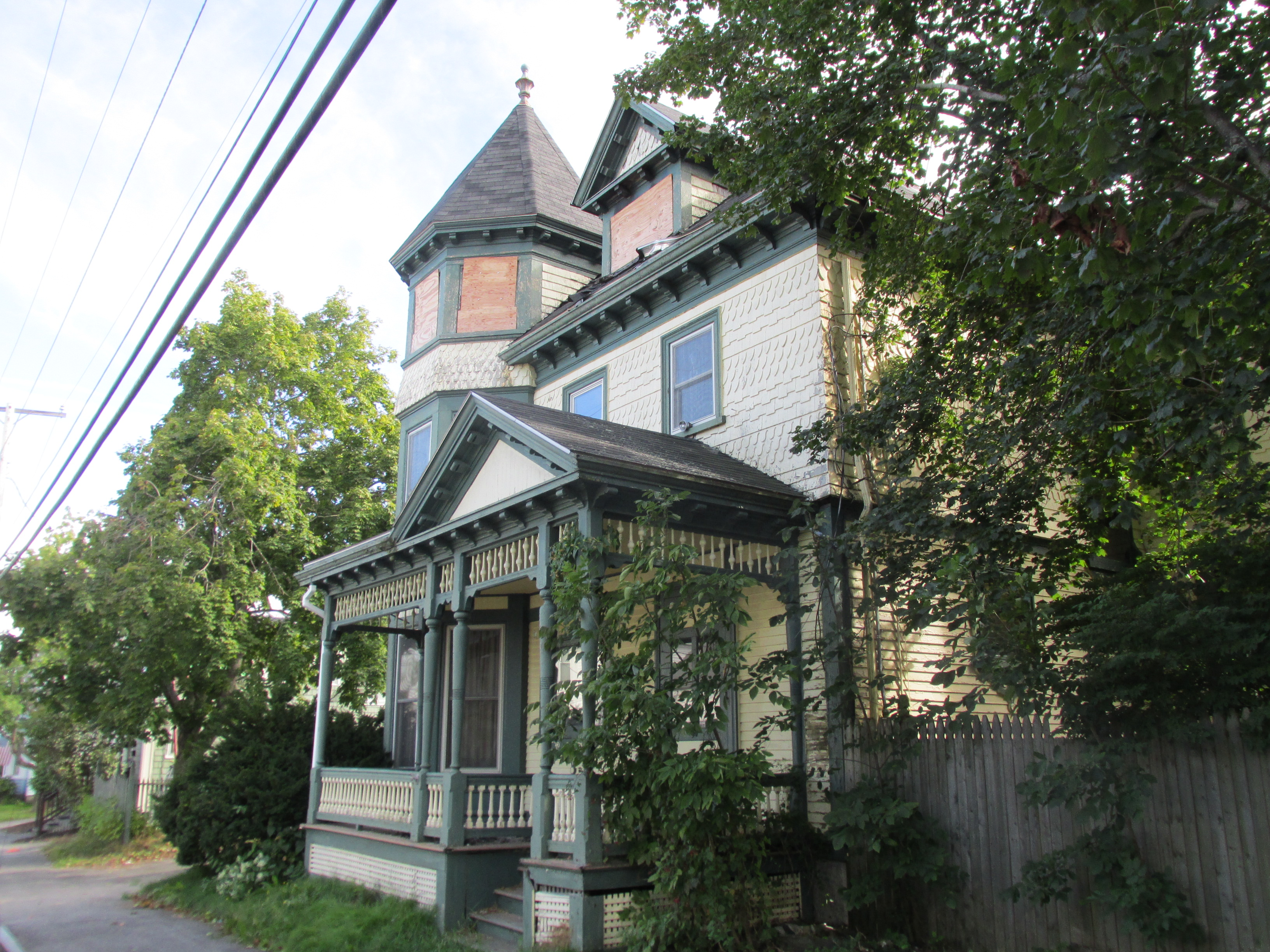

- Location within Maine Location within the United States
- Location: 90 Temple St., Saco, Maine
- Coordinates: 43°30′3″N 70°27′0″W
- Area: 0.5 acres (0.20 ha)
- Built: 1890
- Architect: Josiah M. Littlefield
- Architectural style: Queen Anne
- NRHP reference No.: 78000332
- Added to NRHP: March 31, 1978

The A. B. Seavey House is a historic house at 90 Temple Street in Saco, Maine. Built in 1890, it is one of the city's finest examples of Queen Anne architecture. It was listed on the National Register of Historic Places in 1978.

== Description and history ==
The Seavey House is set on the southwest side of Temple Street, in a residential area northwest of Saco's central business district. It is a 2 1/2-story wood-frame structure, with a roughly rectangular footprint, and an attached carriage barn. A three-story octagonal tower projects from the front left corner, rising to a pyramidal roof. A single-story porch extends across the rest of the front facade, featuring turned balusters and posts, with a delicate valance extending across most of its openings. The porch cornice is modillioned (as indeed are most of the other roof lines), and there is a gable marking the entry. The main roof is hipped, with projecting gabled dormers. The exterior walls are finished in a variety of cut and sawn shingling and clapboards. The interior contains high quality and well-preserved woodwork, although other finishes (wallpaper) have been modernized.

The house was built in 1890 for Alton B. Seavey, a local musical instrument salesman. Of particular note for this house is the fact that a complete set of architect's drawings have survived, showing that most, but not all, of the original plan was followed. The plan called for the construction of two chimneys, but only one (that near the rear) was actually built.

As of September 30, 2022, the Saco Fire Department has posted a not safe to enter sign due to its deteriorating condition

== See also ==
- National Register of Historic Places listings in York County, Maine
