= Elder Grey Meetinghouse =

Historic church in Maine, United States

- U.S. National Register of Historic Places
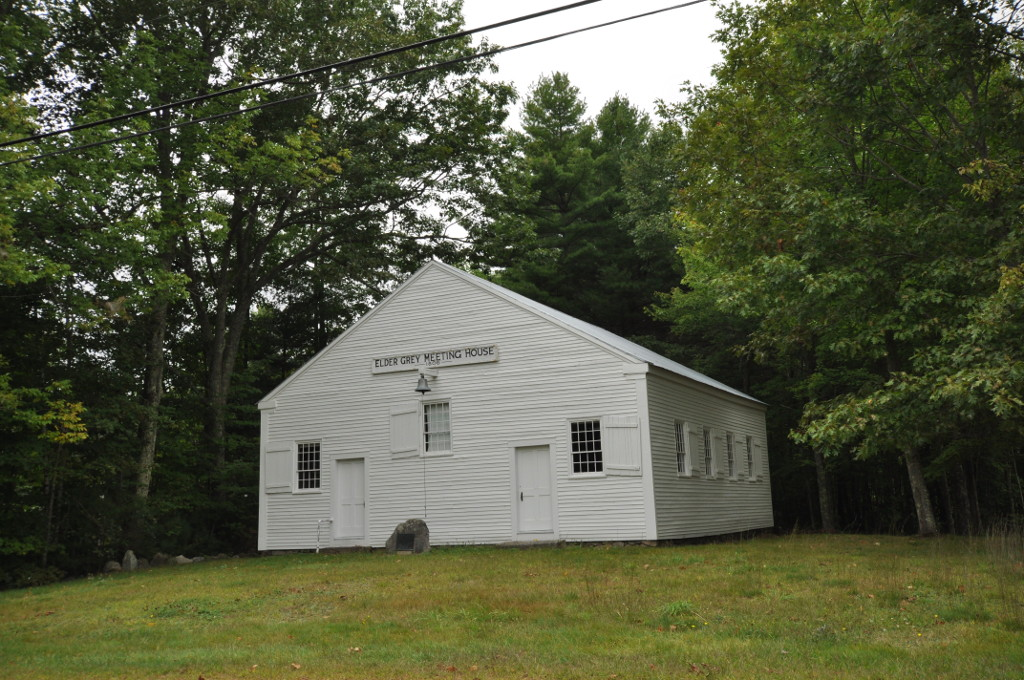

- Location within Maine Location within the United States
- Nearest city: North Waterboro, Maine
- Coordinates: 43°38′10″N 70°42′50″W
- Area: 0.5 acres (0.20 ha)
- Built: 1806
- NRHP reference No.: 79000175
- Added to NRHP: October 09, 1979

The Elder Grey Meetinghouse is a historic church on Chadbourne Ridge Road in North Waterboro, Maine. Built in 1806, it is one of Maine's oldest churches. The building is now maintained by a preservation association, which hosts annual services each August. The building was listed on the National Register of Historic Places in 1979.

== Description and history ==
The Elder Grey Meetinghouse is located on the west side of Chadbourne Ridge Road in a rural part of northeastern Waterboro. It stands on a small grassy plot, fringed by trees, with a cemetery across the street. The building is a simple single-story wood frame structure, with a front-facing gable roof, clapboard siding, and a fieldstone foundation. The main facade is five bays wide, with a pair of entrances set between sash windows in the outer and central bays. The side elevations each have four sash windows. Trim is quite simple throughout, and there is no tower.

The church was built in 1806, and originally served as a union church with a primarily Baptist affiliation. It is named for Elder James Grey, a Lyman-born pastor who served the church for main years in the first half of the 19th century. Grey's long service and a devoted congregation prompted them to move the building nearly 4 miles (6.4 km) in 1832, so that it would be closer to the then-elderly Grey's home. The congregation's enrollment declined by the 1880s, and the building was abandoned for a time. After a brief revival in the 1890s, it was again abandoned. Local preservationists then banded together, forming an association to preserve the structure. It now hosts an annual "pilgrimage service" each August.

== See also ==
- National Register of Historic Places listings in York County, Maine
- Elder Grey Meeting House and Cemetery
