= Way Way General Store =

- U.S. National Register of Historic Places
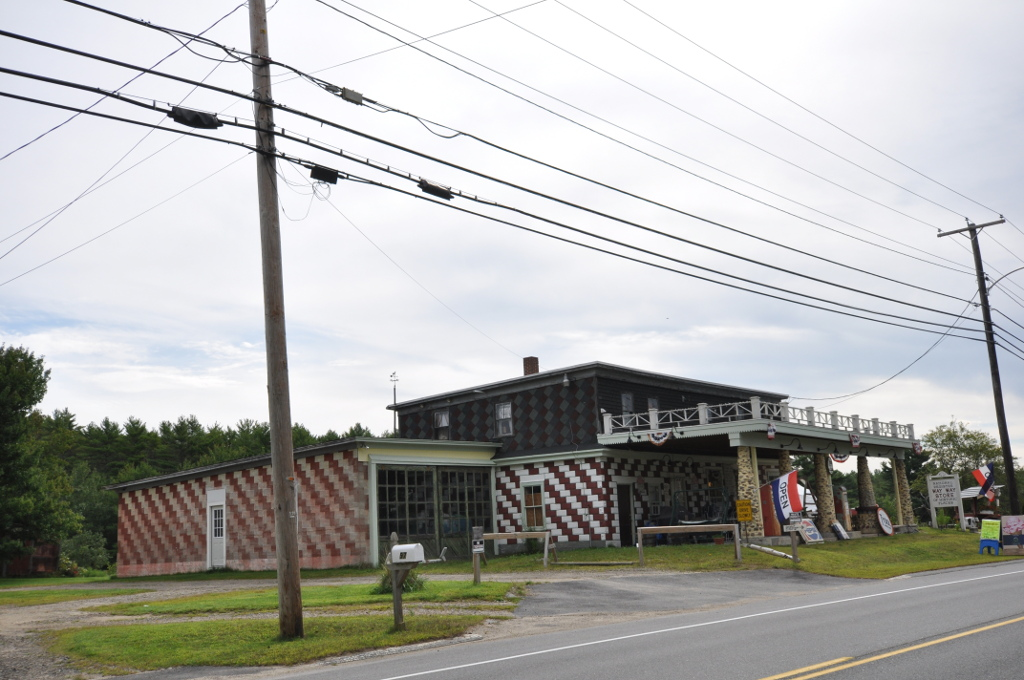

- Location within Maine
- Nearest city: Saco, Maine
- Coordinates: 43°31′57″N 70°28′21″E
- Area: less than one acre
- Built: 1927-1929
- Architect: Cousens, Eugene M.
- NRHP reference No.: 95001462
- Added to NRHP: December 14, 1995

The Way Way General Store was a historical and architecturally eclectic general store at 93 Buxton Road in Saco, Maine. Built 1927-29, it operated starting then by members of the Cousens family before closing in 2003, reopening in 2010, temporarily closing in 2025, and permanently closing in 2026. It was listed on the National Register of Historic Places in 1995 for its architecture and its role in the rural economy of northern Saco.

== Description and history ==
The Way Way General Store was located on the east side of Buxton Road (Maine State Route 112) in rural northern Saco, about 2 miles (3.2 km) northwest of the city center. It was an architecturally and visually eclectic two story structure, built out of hand-formed concrete blocks on the first floor, and shingled wood framing on the second. The first floor blocks were painted red and white in an alternating pattern, with the grout lines painted green. A porte cochere extended across the front of the store, supported by columns of fieldstone and topped by a balustrade. It sheltered two c. 1940s "National" brand gasoline pumps, no longer in service. To the left side was a poured-concrete two-bay garage, whose walls were scored and painted to mimic the main building's color scheme. The interior of the building retained all of its original layout, fixtures, and woodwork.

The store was built over a three year period, between 1927 and 1929, by Eugene Cousens and his son Carrol. The older Cousens sold gasoline from this property since 1916, and opened a small store in a wood frame building in 1924. With the construction of this building, Cousens began carried a wider array of general merchandise, and became a mainstay of the relatively rural area. The garage bays were added in the 1930s, where Carrol Cousens serviced automobiles until the 1950s. As of the store's listing on the National Register in 1995, the property remains in the hands of Cousens' daughters. The store closed in 2003 before being reopened by Peter Scontras in 2010 under a lease agreement with the Cousens Family. The store temporarily closed in October 2025, following the death of Bridget Scontras from Parkinson's disease, and permanently closed in March 2026 following Peter Scontras's retirement.

== See also ==
- National Register of Historic Places listings in York County, Maine
