= Jacobs Houses and Store =

Historic house in Maine, United States

- U.S. National Register of Historic Places
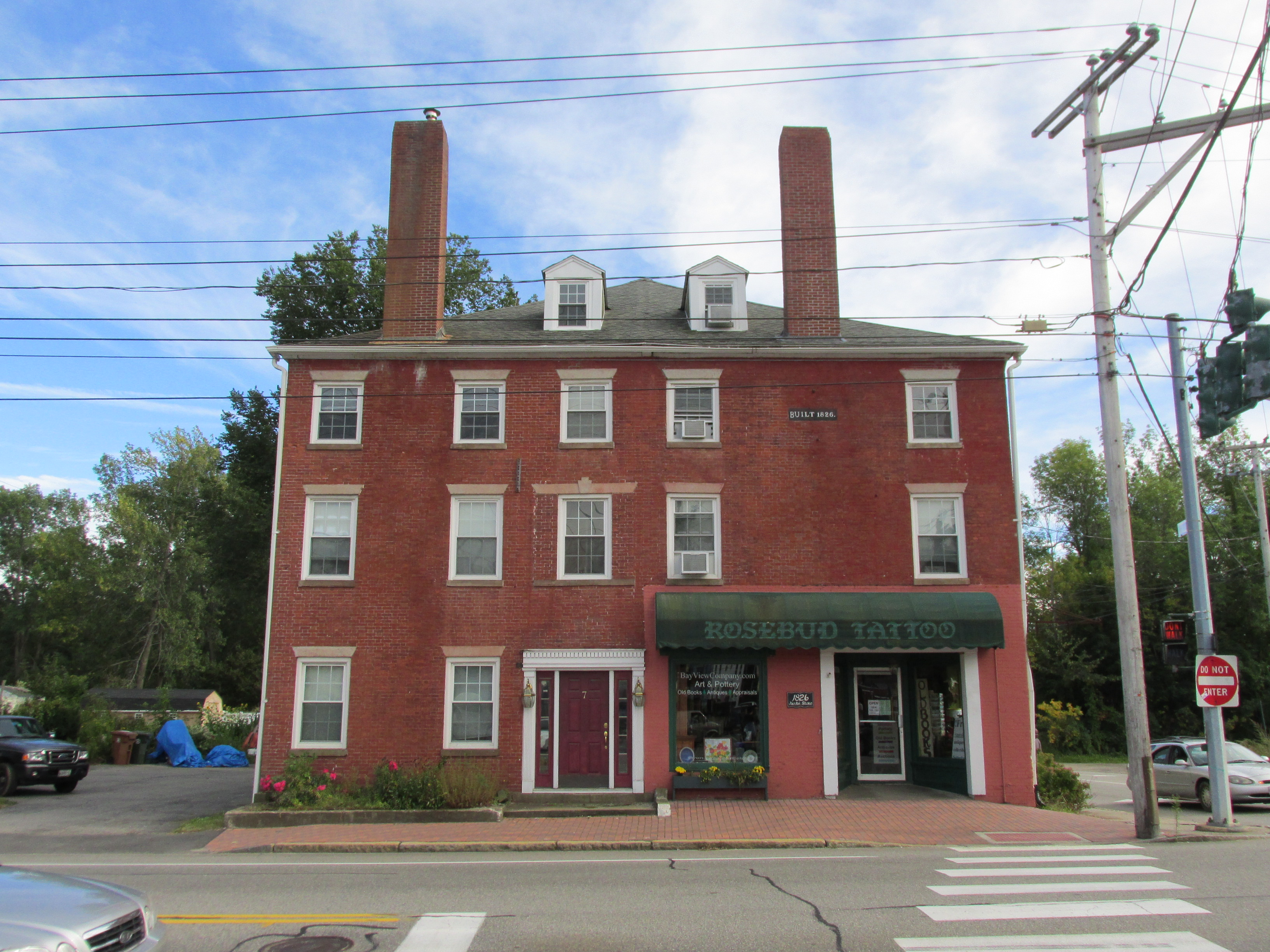
- The 1826 Jacobs Store

- Location within Maine Location within the United States
- Location: 9-17 Elm St., Saco, Maine
- Coordinates: 43°29′56″N 70°27′2″W
- Area: 1.5 acres (0.61 ha)
- Built: 1820
- Built by: Jacobs, Benjamin & Moses
- Architectural style: Federal
- NRHP reference No.: 82000795
- Added to NRHP: March 2, 1982

The Jacobs Houses and Store are a collection of three Federal-period historic buildings at 9-17 Elm Street in Saco, Maine. Built between 1820 and 1826, there are two similar wood-frame houses and a large brick commercial building, all associated with the Jacobs family, local businessmen. The buildings were listed as a group on the National Register of Historic Places in 1982.

== Description and history ==
The Jacobs buildings line the south side of Elm Street (United States Route 1), just east of the Saco River and a short way north of the city's central business district. Three buildings stand on the block between Water and Storer Streets that was purchased in 1817 by Benjamin and Moses Jacob. The westernmost building is the three-story brick Jacobs Store, which has a hip roof, and granite trim, and was built in 1826 by Benjamin Jacobs. At the eastern end stands Benjamin's house, which was built c. 1820. It is a two-story wood-frame structure, with a hip roof, twin interior chimneys, clapboard siding, and a stone foundation. Its main facade is five bays wide, with a center entrance flanked by sidelight windows and topped by a delicate fanlight. At the center of the group stands the house of Moses Jacobs, which was probably identical to that of his brother at its construction, which was between 1820 and 1826. Its entrance was altered when the house was converted to a duplex, so it now has two doorways sharing an entablature.

The business venture of the two brothers suffered an ignominious end. Moses Jacobs died in 1827, and Benjamin soon afterward declared bankruptcy. The houses and store they built represent a well-preserved aspect of early-19th century commercial and residential architecture in the city.

== See also ==
- National Register of Historic Places listings in York County, Maine
