= Lincoln School (Acton, Maine) =

- U.S. National Register of Historic Places
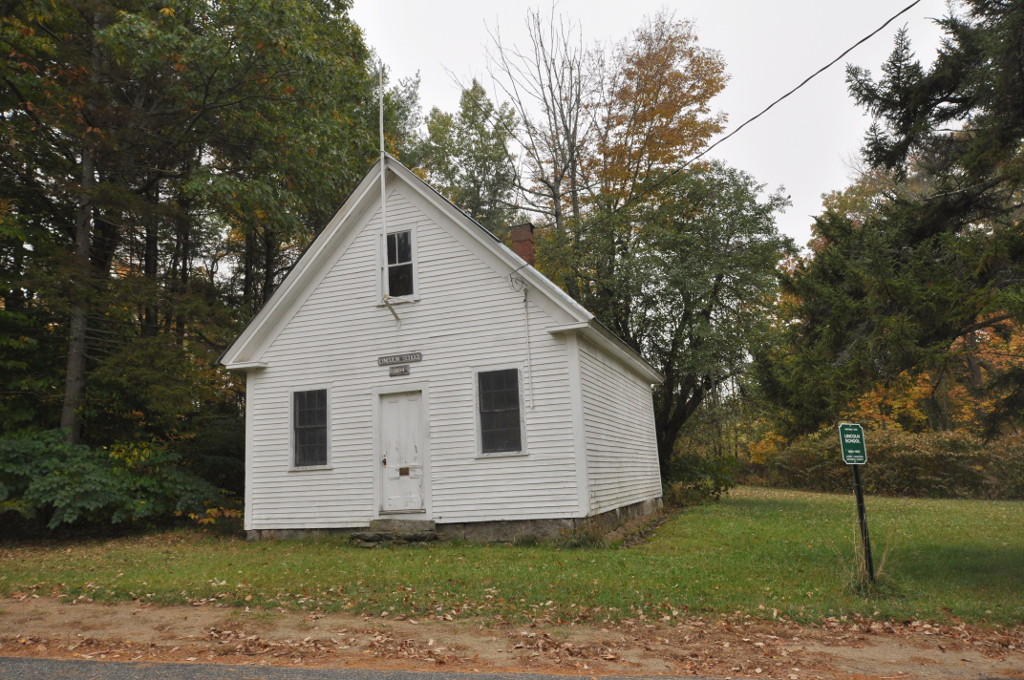

- Location within Maine Location within the United States
- Location: 8 Orchard Rd., Acton, Maine
- Coordinates: 43.49152°N 70.91119°W
- Area: less than one acre
- Built: 1884
- NRHP reference No.: 13000189
- Added to NRHP: April 23, 2013

The Lincoln School is a historic former one-room schoolhouse at 8 Orchard Road in Acton, Maine. Built in 1884, it is the best-preserved of the town's surviving district school buildings, and was its last active district school, closed in 1957. It was listed on the National Register of Historic Places in 2013.

== Description and history ==
The Lincoln School is set at the southwest corner of Orchard and County Roads in rural southern Acton. It is a single-story wood frame structure, measuring 21 by 28 feet (6.4 m × 8.5 m), with a gable roof and clapboard siding. Two small additions extend the building to the rear. Its main facade, facing east, is symmetrically arranged, with a single door flanked by sash windows, and a third window in the gable above. The door opens into a vestibule area spanning the width of the building, with two doors providing access to the classroom. Privies are located in the first addition, and a woodshed in the second.

The school was built in 1884, replacing an older building. A few years after its construction, district schools were brought under control of the town (having previously been managed by an elected committee from the district), and a long-running process of consolidation was begun. The first district schools to be closed were in 1895. This school, however, remained open, receiving necessary modernization (addition of the privies and woodshed) following the introduction of state-level standards in 1909. Acton's last three district schools, this one among them, were closed in 1957. The building has since been used as a meeting place for the local 4-H club.

== See also ==
- National Register of Historic Places listings in York County, Maine
