= Elden's Store =

- U.S. National Register of Historic Places
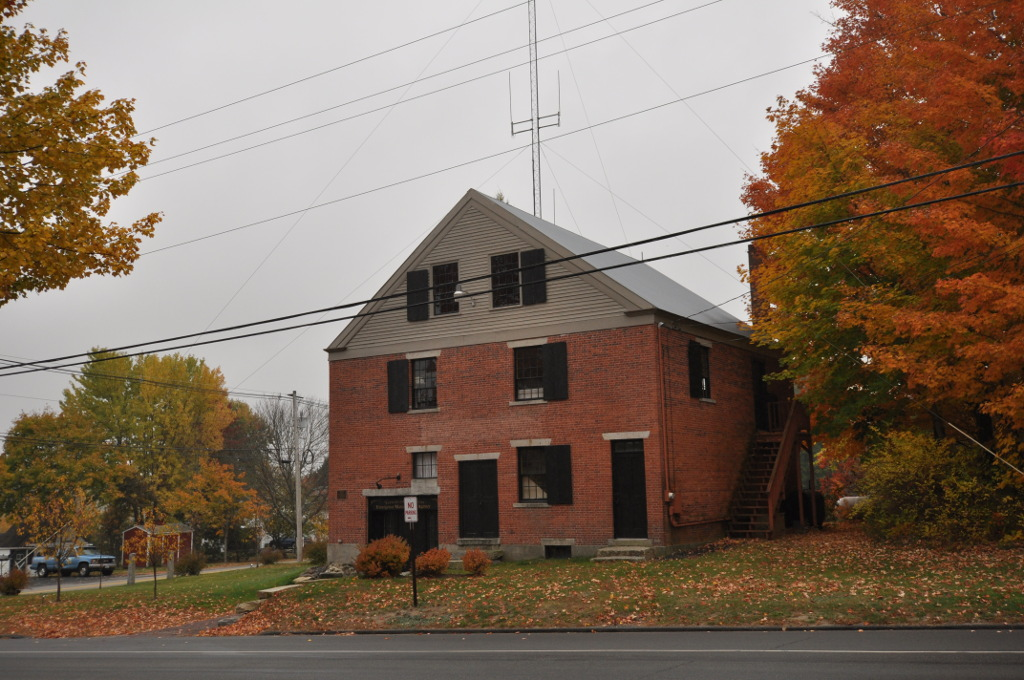

- Location within Maine Location within the United States
- Location: ME 22, Buxton, Maine
- Coordinates: 43°38′55″N 70°32′31″W
- Area: 0.3 acres (0.12 ha)
- Built: 1802
- Architectural style: Federal
- NRHP reference No.: 83000481
- Added to NRHP: April 28, 1983

Elden's Store is a historic commercial building on Long Plains Road (Maine State Route 22) in the center of Buxton, Maine. Built in 1802, it is the oldest commercial building in the rural community, and is one of the few historic brick commercial buildings in western York County. The building, which is now owned by the local historical society, was listed on the National Register of Historic Places in 1983.

== Description and history ==
Elden's Store is set at the western corner of Long Plains Road and Haines Meadow Road. It is a 2-1/2 story rectangular brick building, with a wood-frame gable roof, oriented toward Long Plains Road, and a granite foundation. The brick is laid in English bond and is painted red. The building's doors and windows are set in openings with simple granite sills and lintels. There are a number of doors, and the placement of both the doors and windows is not planned with any great degree of symmetry. The south facade (facing Haines Meadow Road) is the most symmetrical, with three bays on each level and a single center entrance. The interior of the building has seen numerous alterations over its long history.

The store was built in 1802, and its ground floor served as a general store into the 1930s. The upper floor has seen a variety of uses, including a successful local coat manufacturing business in the mid-19th century. The Buxton-Hollis Historical Society used the upper floor as a meeting space for many years beginning in 1971, and the basement was adapted as a medical clinic in 1975. The historical society now occupies a newer facility, but maintains ownership of the building. It presently houses a regional emergency communications facility.

== See also ==
- National Register of Historic Places listings in York County, Maine
