= Dennis Johnson Lumber Company Mill =

- U.S. National Register of Historic Places
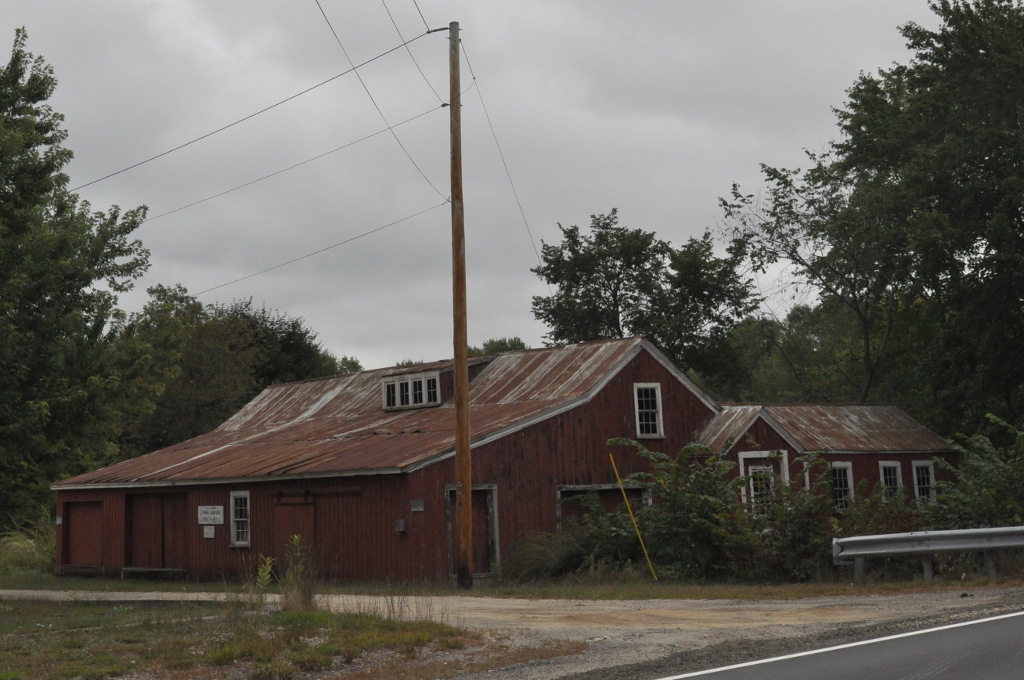

- Location within Maine Location within the United States
- Location: NE side of ME 5, 0.3 mi. N of Silas Brown Rd., Waterboro, Maine
- Coordinates: 43°37′9″N 70°43′56″W
- Area: 0.5 acres (0.20 ha)
- Built: 1902
- Architect: Dennis Johnson
- Architectural style: Concrete Arch Bridge
- NRHP reference No.: 07000409
- Added to NRHP: May 8, 2007

The Dennis Johnson Lumber Company Mill is a historic industrial facility on Maine State Route 5 in Waterboro, Maine. For nearly a century beginning in 1869, a lumber mill, powered first by water and then steam, was operated at this location. The property, much of whose equipment is still in situ following its closure in 1963, is a rare surviving 19th-century industrial facility in the rural community. Now owned by the local historical society (which hopes to transform it into a museum property), it was listed on the National Register of Historic Places in 2007.

== Description and history ==
The Johnson Mill is located on the north side of Maine State Route 5, just south of North Waterboro village. The mill pond is located on the south side of the highway, which crosses over Johnson Stream on a concrete bridge built by mill owner Dennis Johnson in 1920. The mill dam, now breached, lies nearly underneath the bridge. The main mill building, dating to 1902, is a three-part structure, whose largest section is a 1-1/2 story wood frame structure with a gabled roof, with a shed-roofed extension along its western side. Attached to the southeastern corner, and extending over the streambed, is a single-story wing with a gable roof oriented parallel to the highway. The main building is set on a concrete foundation, as is most of the wing; the part over the stream is supported by concrete pylons.

The building has no obvious main entrance. Its south (street-facing) facade has a pedestrian door and a cargo bay with loading ramp, while the west side has a large sliding door at the southern end, and hinged sections to the north that provide additional illumination and ventilation to the interior. The north side also has two utility entrances. The buildings interior has exposed wall framing and wood plank flooring. A large bandsaw, built by the Berlin Machine Works, is located in the eastern part of the building, and there is also a crosscut saw for trimming ends, an edger/jointer, and planer. A winch provides additional power for moving large pieces of lumber around. The southeast wing houses the "file room", where saw blades were stored and sharpened. The basement of the building houses the remains of a large steam boiler.

The mill was established in 1869 by Dennis Johnson, then 23, and was documented to produce 40,000 pine shingles in 1870, operating for four months. The mill was one of six mills operating in Waterboro, typically processing locally harvested lumber. Its output increased around the turn of the 20th century with the introduction of steam power, and employed as many as twelve workers. Johnson built the present structure to replace the earlier mill, which was depicted in 1890 as being somewhat dilapidated. The mill was the only one in town to survive a devastating fire in 1947, which swept through the community and its forests. Dennis Johnson's grandson Donald closed the mill in 1963. It was acquired by the Waterboro Historic Society in 1974.

== See also ==
- National Register of Historic Places listings in York County, Maine
