= Pebbledene =

Historic house in Maine, United States

- U.S. National Register of Historic Places
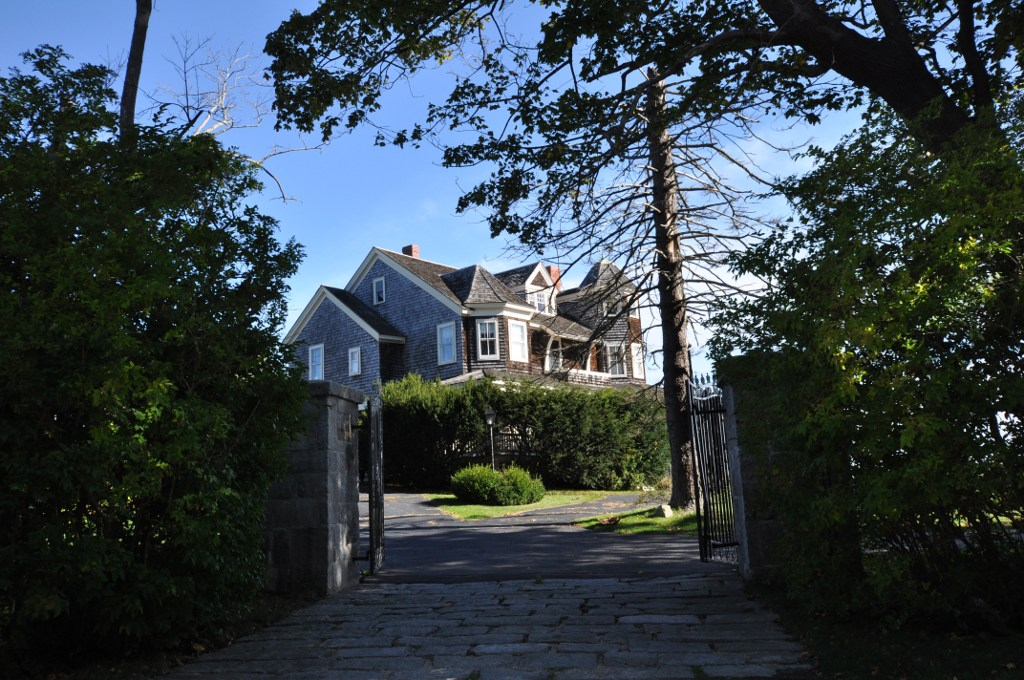

- Location within Maine Location within the United States
- Location: 99 Freeman St., York Beach, Maine
- Coordinates: 43°10′51″N 70°36′19″W
- Area: less than one acre
- Built: 1896
- Architect: Albert J. Talpey
- Architectural style: Queen Anne
- NRHP reference No.: 93001110
- Added to NRHP: October 14, 1993

Pebbledene is a historic house at 99 Freeman Street in the York Beach area of York, Maine. Built in 1896, this Queen Anne/Shingle style house was the last large-scale summer house built in the area. It was listed on the National Register of Historic Places in 1993.

== Description and history ==
Pebbledene stands near Barn Point on the east side of Freeman Street, facing the Gulf of Maine, just south of the junction with Bay Haven Road. It is a 2 1/2-story wood-frame structure, with a gable roof studded with gables and projecting sections typical of the Queen Anne style. The house is finished in wooden shingles on the upper floors, while the first floor is weatherboarded. An octagonal tower three stories in height stands at the southwest corner, and a porch wraps around it to the ocean-facing front. A smaller porch, sheltered by a continuation of the roof, extends over the center portion of the lower porch. The interior of the house retains much of its original design work, including fireplaces, with mirrored mantels, and an elaborate central staircase.

The house was built in 1896 for Edwin Rogers, president of a Boston-based manufacturer of fire alarms, and was named for the large number of pebbles on nearby beaches. It was built on three lots of a subdivision laid out by Henry Evanston that was generally built out with much less pretentious buildings. Although several other large summer houses like this were built in the York Beach area, most of them have since been demolished or significantly altered.

== See also ==
- National Register of Historic Places listings in York County, Maine
