= Hedden Site =

- U.S. National Register of Historic Places
- Nearest city: Kennebunk, Maine
- Area: 32 acres (13 ha)
- NRHP reference No.: 91001515
- Added to NRHP: October 16, 1991

The Hedden Site, designated Site 4.10 by the Maine Archaeological Survey, is a prehistoric archaeological site in Kennebunk, Maine. The site has been radiocarbon dated to c. 8550 BCE, and is a rare example in the state of a completely undisturbed (unplowed), stratified site. The site was listed on the National Register of Historic Places in 1991.

== Description ==
The Hedden Site, named for its discoverer, Maine archaeologist Mark Hedden, is in an area composed of dune-like wind-blown sands that have been stabilized by grasses and blueberry bushes that have taken hold. There is no evidence that colonial or modern agriculture has taken place, although it was probably pine forest that was cleared at some time. These dune formations are consistent with others in Maine that were apparently deposited about 11,000 years ago (c. 8000 BCE), most of which have been disturbed in some way. There is some evidence that fire had swept the area, although it was unclear if the fire was caused by humans. The site was discovered during a test survey in 1990, whose test pits had largely had negative results, when Hedden spotted a stone flake on the surface. Most of the materials recovered were found in test pits dug around this find site.

Finds at the site include stone fragments from a variety of regional sources, ranging from sources in the Hudson River valley to Munsungan quarries of northern Maine. One well-shaped stone tool, a chert "endscraper", was found, as was a second, fragmentary piece, still razor sharp, that had apparently been used once and then discarded.

== See also ==
- National Register of Historic Places listings in York County, Maine
