= Benjamin and Abigail Dalton House =

Historic house in Maine, United States

- U.S. National Register of Historic Places
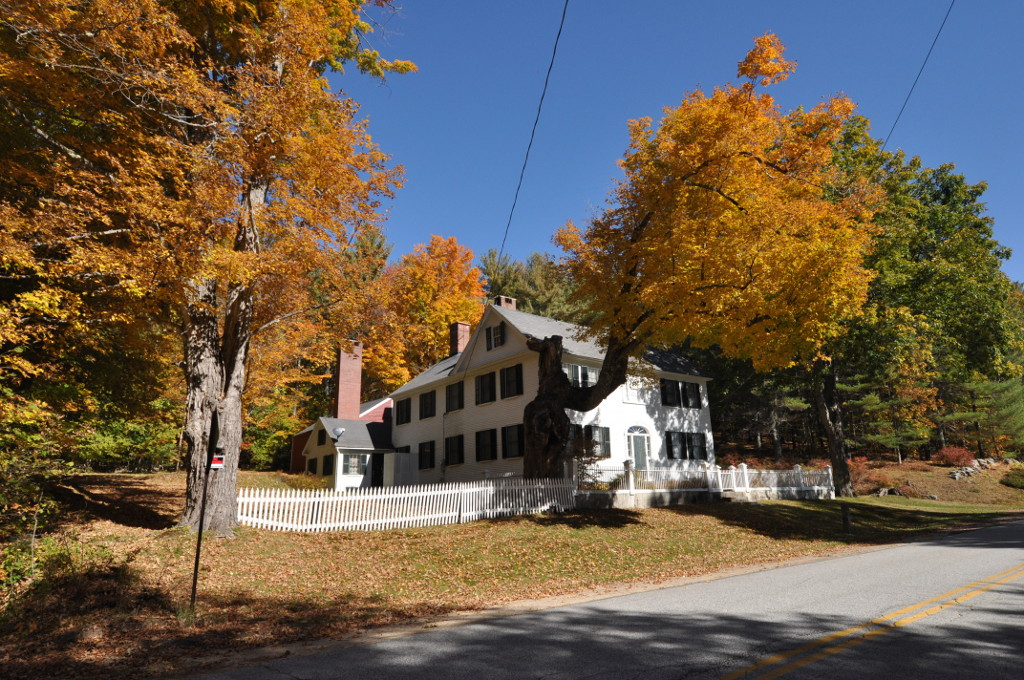

- Location within Maine Location within the United States
- Nearest city: North Parsonsfield, Maine
- Coordinates: 43.72707°N 70.92843°W
- Area: 18 acres (7.3 ha)
- Built: 1810
- NRHP reference No.: 97000311
- Added to NRHP: April 14, 1997

The Benjamin and Abigail Dalton House is a historic house on Middle Road in North Parsonsfield, Maine. Built in the early 19th century, it is a fine local example of Federal style, and is notable for the murals drawn on its walls by Jonathan Poor, an itinerant artist. The house was listed on the National Register of Historic Places in 1997.

== Description and history ==
The Dalton House is located on the north side of Middle Road, just east of its junction with Merrill Hill Road. It is set on a grassy lot behind a low stone retaining wall which is topped by a picket fence. An old hitching post stands near the street. The house is a 2 1/2-story wood-frame structure, five bays wide, with a side gable roof, single off-center interior chimney, clapboard siding, and a granite foundation. Closely spaced pairs of sash windows are found on the outer bays, with the entrance in the center bay, flanked by sidelight windows and topped by a semi-oval fanlight window. At the second level above the entrance is a sash window with flanking sidelights. Ells extend the house to the rear.

The house is noted in part because it was decorated by the itinerant muralist Jonathan D. Poor, probably sometime in the 1830s. Poor was the nephew of Rufus Porter, who is more widely known as the founder of Scientific American magazine, but had an early career as an itinerant painter, and trained Poor in his methods. The Dalton house artwork is one of a relatively small number of house murals attributable to Poor because he signed the work.

== See also ==
- National Register of Historic Places listings in York County, Maine
