= Bourne Mansion =

Historic house in Maine, United States

- U.S. National Register of Historic Places
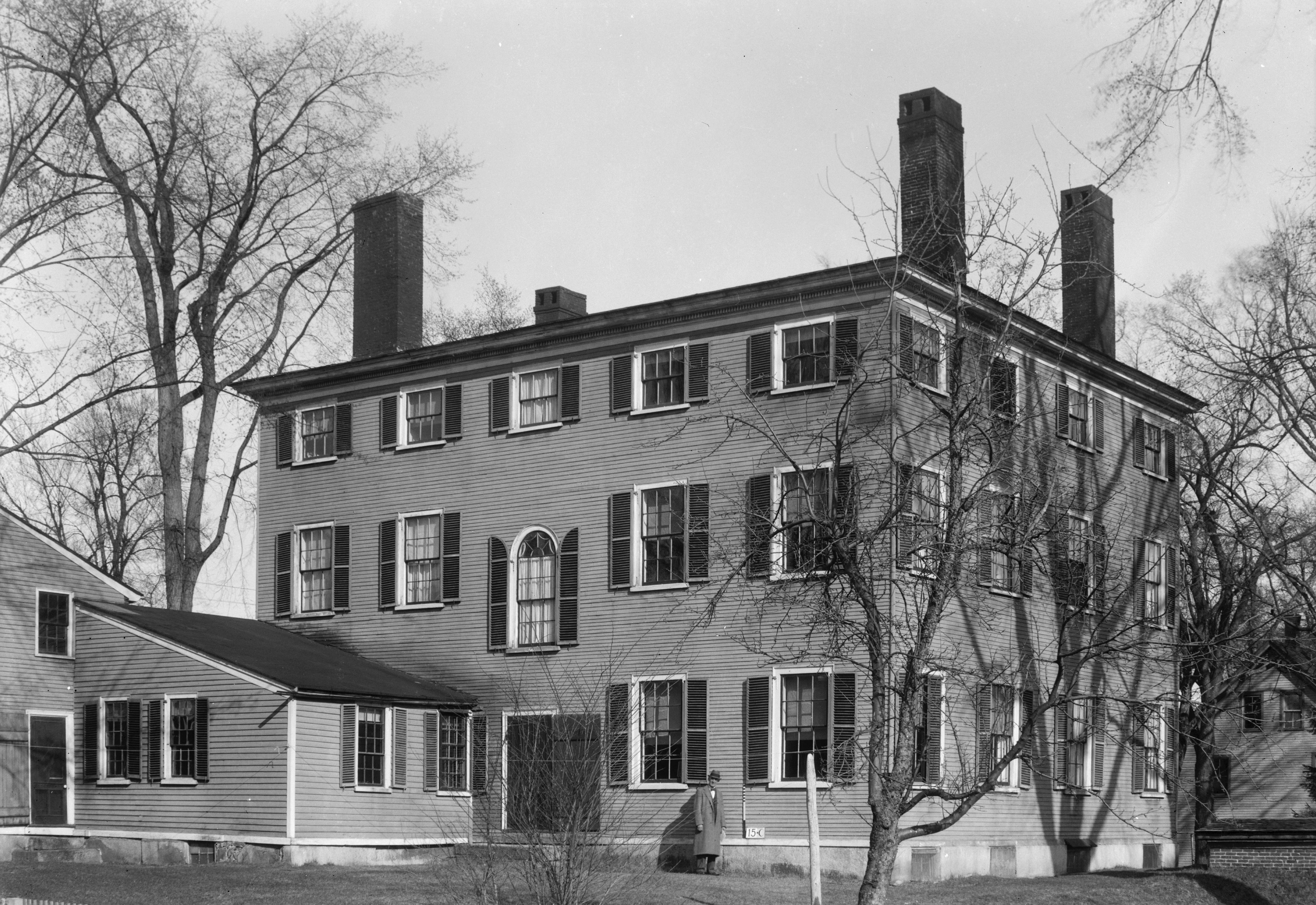

- Location within Maine Location within the United States
- Location: 8 Bourne Street, Kennebunk, Maine
- Coordinates: 43°23′12″N 70°32′26″W
- Area: 0.5 acres (0.20 ha)
- Built: 1812
- Architectural style: Federal
- NRHP reference No.: 80000381
- Added to NRHP: January 24, 1980

The Bourne Mansion is a historic house at 8 Bourne Street in Kennebunk, Maine, United States. Built in 1812, it is a fine local example of Federal architecture. It was owned for many years by members of the locally prominent Bourne family. It was added to the National Register of Historic Places on January 24, 1980.

== Description and history ==
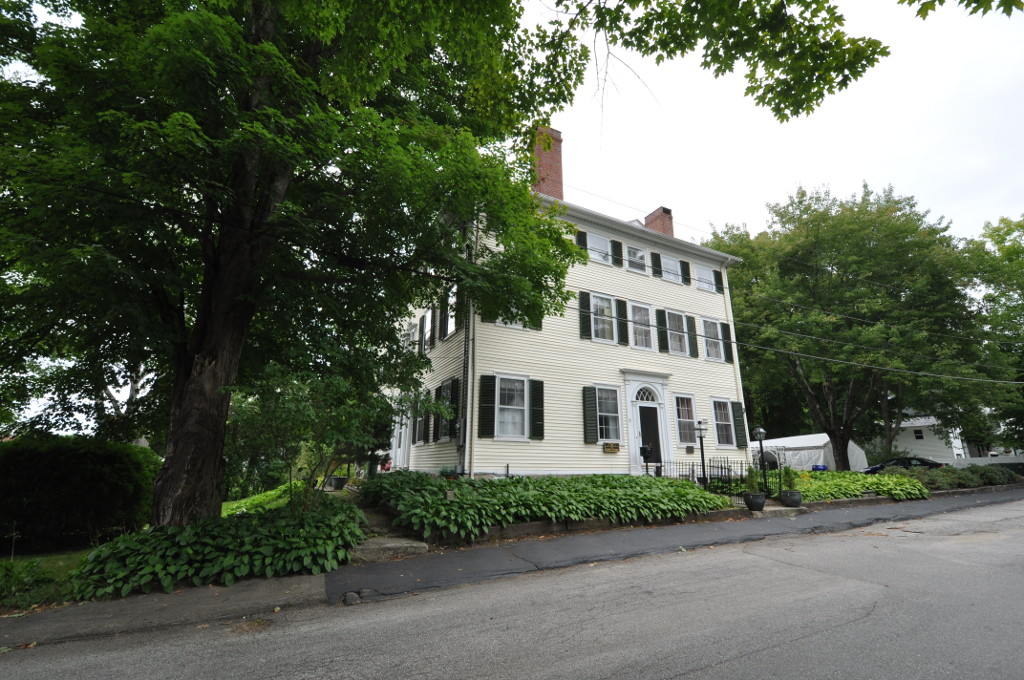
The Bourne House in 2014

The Bourne Mansion is set on the west side of Bourne Street, in a small residential area north of United States Route 1 in the town center. It is a three-story wood-frame structure, with a low-pitch hip roof, clapboard siding, and a granite foundation. The main facade faces south, and is five bays wide, with a central entrance flanked by sidelight windows and Tuscan pilasters, and is topped by a fan-light window. Above this entrance is a Palladian window. There is a secondary entrance on the street-facing eastern facade, with Ionic pilasters supporting an entablature, with a fanlight just below. A single-story addition, built in the late 19th century, extends to the north. The interior has retained its elegant Federal finish, including a wide central hallway and a fine central spiral staircase. The side hall leading to the eastern entrance has a particularly fine carved arched niche for housing a tall clock.

When John Parsons, a successful merchant, built the house in 1812, he copied his wife's house in Newburyport, Massachusetts. The house was sold to the Sewall family in 1815, and was bequeathed by Mrs. William Sewall to her nephew, Edward Bourne, Jr. in the late 19th century. The Bournes are a historically old family of Kennebunk, with a long line of civic and economically significant actors.

== See also ==
- National Register of Historic Places listings in York County, Maine
