= Rendezvous Point Burying Ground =

- U.S. National Register of Historic Places
- Location within Maine Location within the United States
- Location: South side of Ferry Rd., between Meadow and Lewis Lns., Saco, Maine
- Coordinates: 43°28′47″N 70°24′21″W
- Area: 0.5 acres (0.20 ha)
- Built: before 1721
- NRHP reference No.: 100007255
- Added to NRHP: December 8, 2021

The Rendezvous Point Burying Ground is a historic cemetery off Ferry Road in Saco, Maine. Probably established in 17th century, it is possibly the oldest surviving colonial cemetery in the state of Maine. It was listed on the National Register of Historic Places in 2021.

== Description and history ==
The Rendezvous Point Burying Ground is a small, 0.25-acre (0.10 ha) cemetery, located in a rural-residential area of southeastern Saco. It is set between Ferry Road and the Saco River on a high point of land which, if less wooded, would provide views of a large bend in the river. It is accessed via a long unpaved road leading south from Ferry Road. It is a basically rectangular plot of land, with no discernible organization to the layout of the graves. Most of the marked gravestones are oriented with the engravings facing west; there are a number of unmarked stone markers, and the site probably has unmarked graves as well. The earliest marked grave is dated 1721.

The area that is now Saco was first settled by English colonists in 1631 by Thomas Lewis and Richard Bonython. A small settlement flourished along both banks of the Saco River near its mouth, until a series of wars with local Native Americans between 1675 and 1713 resulted in its abandonment. The settlers returned later in the 1710s, and had by 1718 reestablished a local government. Rendezvous Point, so named because the settlers believed it to be a Native meeting place, was apparently selected as a community burying ground by the early 18th century. It is known that the point was the site of a fortified garrison house (no longer surviving) in 1690. The point was owned by James Gibbons in the early 18th century; he had married Judith Lewis, daughter of Thomas Lewis, and had inherited Lewis' land grant. The burying ground remained with Gibbons' descendants until 1828, when it was deeded to the city.

== See also ==
- National Register of Historic Places listings in York County, Maine
