= Frost Garrison and House =

Historic house in Maine, United States

- U.S. National Register of Historic Places
- U.S. Historic district
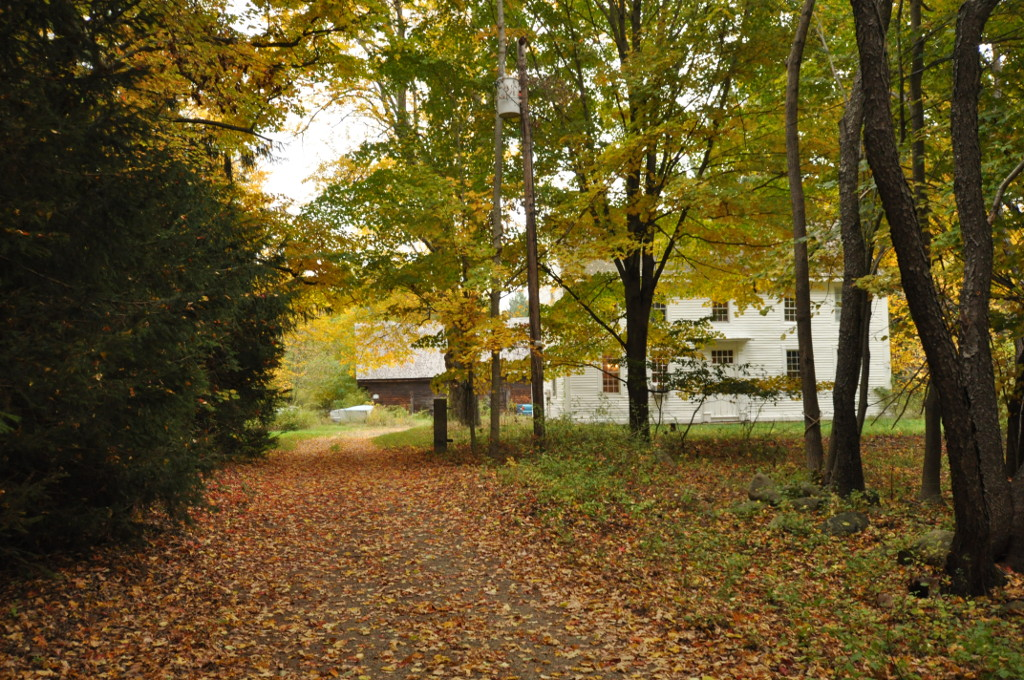

- Location within Maine Location within the United States
- Location: Garrison Drive, Eliot, Maine
- Coordinates: 43°9′42″N 70°44′56″W
- Area: 10 acres (4.0 ha)
- Built: 1733
- NRHP reference No.: 71000045
- Added to NRHP: June 27, 1971

The Frost Garrison and House are a cluster of colonial-era buildings on Garrison Drive in Eliot, Maine. Sited on Frost's Hill, the complex includes a c. 1778 house, and two structures, the oldest dating to 1735, constructed as strongholds against Native American attacks. The older one is the only known surviviving garrison built for the defense of a single family. The house is also the ancestral home of poet Robert Frost, who is known to have visited the area. The complex was listed on the National Register of Historic Places in 1971. His niece, Mara Frost Marshall, was also born there.

== Description and history ==
Frost's Hill is a rise of land just north of the uppermost reaches of the York River in far eastern Eliot. In colonial days, this area was part of Kittery. The Frost property is located off Frost's Hill Road, now surrounded by a modern subdivision, and is accessed via Garrison Drive. The main house is a 2 1/2-story wood-frame structure, five bays wide, with a side gable roof, twin interior chimneys, and clapboard siding. The windows have simple molded surrounds, and the main entrance is flanked by pilasters and topped by an eight-light transom and a cornice. The interior has a center-hall plan, with original wide pine floors on the second floor, and walls finished in wainscoting and plaster. The plaster has been finished with finely detailed stenciled artwork. This house was built about 1778.

To the north, just behind the house, stands a small wooden garrison structure measuring about 15 by 15 feet (4.6 m × 4.6 m). It is built out of hand-hewn timbers, and stands on its original foundation, despite having been relocated for some years to a site in Kittery Point. The wood is pine and oak, the ends of the beams are dovetailed together, with additional framing members that lock the structure together. Some of the beams have portholes through which defenders could fire, plugged with what are believed to be the original wooden plugs. Beyond this building stands a larger two-story garrison structure, also built out of massive hand-hewn timbers measuring as much as 18 by 8 inches (46 cm × 20 cm) in cross-section. This structure's portholes exhibit evidence of military action, including holes likely gouged by arrows and musket balls. The upper floor is accessed via stairs that can be retracted, and has trapdoors through which defenders can fire into the ground floor in the event attackers gain access to it.

In the late 17th and early 18th centuries, southern Maine was repeatedly subjected to Native American attack, and many families living in remote areas built garrisons for security. Colonel John Frost built his house on Frost's Hill in 1733 and built the smaller garrison two years later. The larger garrison, built in 1738, was intended to shelter several area families, and the smaller building was eventually converted for use as a powder magazine. There is no documentary evidence concerning the attack that left the marks on the larger building. Both buildings were used as storage after the Native threat subsided.

This property remained in Frost family hands until the 20th century and is the home of ancestors of poet Robert Frost. It is the only known assemblage of these types of family-built private garrison structures in the United States.

== See also ==
- National Register of Historic Places listings in York County, Maine
