= Grant Family House =

Historic house in Maine, United States

- U.S. National Register of Historic Places
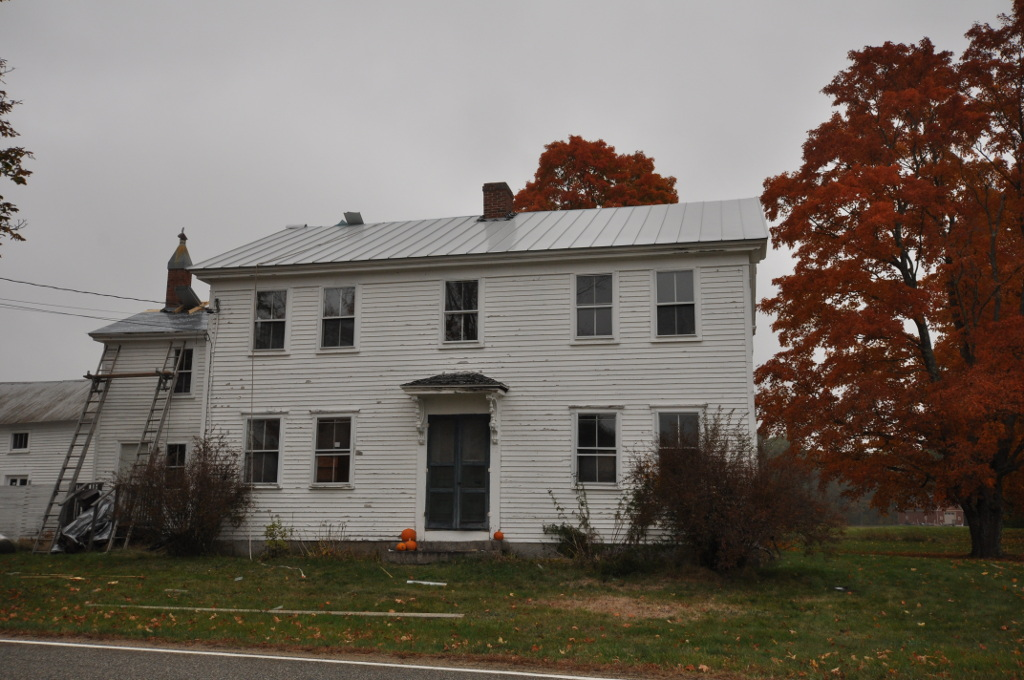

- Location within Maine Location within the United States
- Location: 72 Grant St., Saco, Maine
- Coordinates: 43°34′47″N 70°30′15″W
- Area: 1 acre (0.40 ha)
- Built: 1825
- Architectural style: Federal
- NRHP reference No.: 90000927
- Added to NRHP: June 21, 1990

The Grant Family House is a historic house at 72 Grant Street in Saco, Maine. Built in 1825, the house is a fine local example of Federal period architecture, but is most notable for an extensive series of well-preserved stenciled artwork on the walls of its hall and main parlor. The house was listed on the National Register of Historic Places in 1990.

== Description and history ==
The Grant House is located on the north side of Grant Road in the rural northern part of Saco. The main block, built about 1800, is a 2 1/2-story wood-frame structure, five bays wide, with a side-gable roof, central chimney, and clapboard siding. A small two-story ell extends to the left, joining the main house to a small barn with two garage bays, from which another structure projects to the rear. The main entrance is centered, and sheltered by a bracketed hood with a hip roof (a later Italianate alteration).

The interior of the main block follows a typical central-chimney plan, with a narrow entry vestibule, from which a narrow staircase winds upward, chambers flanking the chimney to either side, and the kitchen and a small bedroom in the rear, along with a second staircase and a passage to the ell. The interior has retained most of its original Federal period woodwork. The most significant feature of the interior is the extensive stencilwork applied to the walls of the front entry hall and the right-side parlor. The hall has panels of pineapples separated by oak leaf clusters, with bands of oak leaf foliage. The parlor has similar banding at the top and bottom, with stencil patterns of sunflowers and vines with poppies. Above the fireplace are two examples of peacocks with four baskets. The artwork is in a style popularized by the itinerant New Hampshire-based stencil artist Moses Eaton, and the examples in this house were first documented in 1937.

== See also ==
- National Register of Historic Places listings in York County, Maine
