= York Cliffs Historic District =

Historic district in Maine, United States

- U.S. National Register of Historic Places
- U.S. Historic district
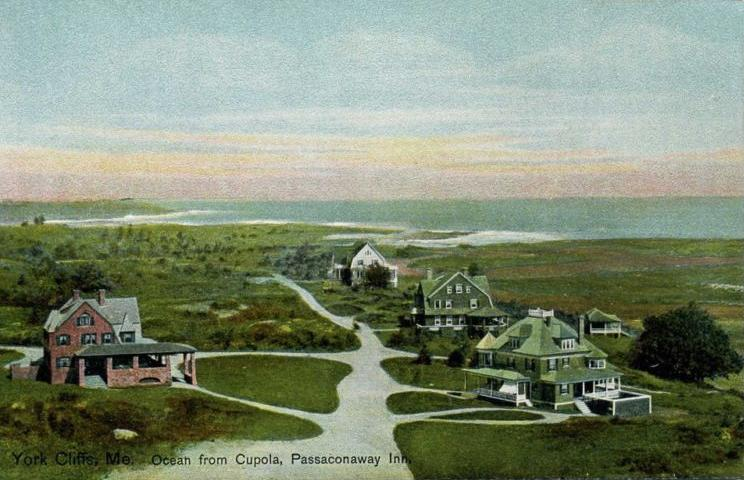
- Bird's-eye view c. 1906

- Location within Maine Location within the United States
- Location: Agamenticus Avenue, York, Maine
- Coordinates: 43°11′31″N 70°35′56″W
- Area: 95 acres (38 ha)
- Built: 1892
- Architect: Goodwin, Everett
- Architectural style: Queen Anne, Shingle Style
- NRHP reference No.: 84001560
- Added to NRHP: July 26, 1984

The York Cliffs Historic District is located on Agamenticus Avenue in York, Maine. The district was added to the National Register of Historic Places on July 26, 1984. It encompasses a collection of eight late Victorian summer mansions built as part of an exclusive development by the York Cliffs Company between 1890 and 1902, representing one of the finest such collections remaining on the coast of Maine. The district was listed on the National Register of Historic Places in 1984.

== Description and history ==
The York Cliffs District extends along a portion of Agamenticus Avenue, located on a bluff overlooking the Gulf of Maine just north of the mouth of the Cape Neddick River. It includes six houses on the north side of the road, extending eastward from its western junction with Shore Road, and includes two on the south side, nearly opposite the last of the six houses. All of these houses are set on large, landscaped lots. Six of them are in the Shingle style, popular for resort buildings at the time of their construction, while one is in the more elaborate Queen Anne style. The eighth house, the first encountered at the Agamenticus and Shore, has as its oldest portion a Federal period house, built about 1800, which was enlarged with Colonial Revival additions in 1895.

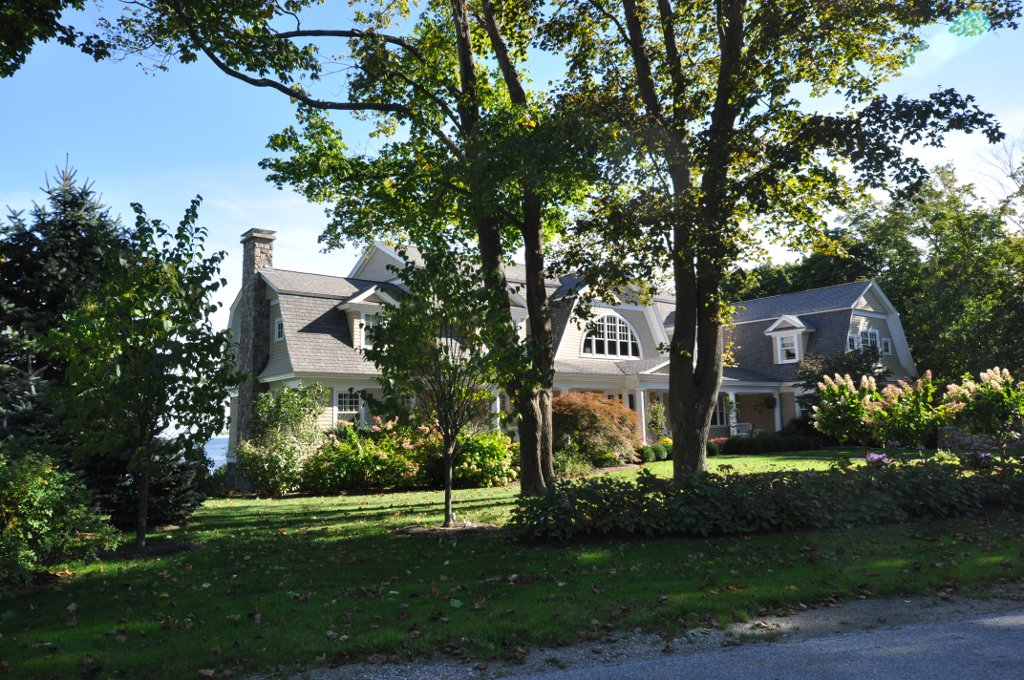

The York Cliffs Development Company was founded to develop an exclusive resort community for the wealthy. In all, the company built thirteen summer houses, a golf course, and a large resort hotel, the Passaconway Inn, designed by local architect Edward Blaisdell. The hotel was torn down in the 1930s, and only eight of the company's houses have survived. At the time of their construction, these properties would have had unobstructed views of the sea, but have since been hemmed in by vegetation and infill development. These houses were furnished with the latest amenities, including water and sewer service.

== See also ==
- National Register of Historic Places listings in York County, Maine
