= Brave Boat Harbor Farm =

Historic house in Maine, United States

- U.S. National Register of Historic Places
- U.S. Historic district
- Location within Maine Location within the United States
- Location: 110 Raynes Neck Rd., York, Maine
- Coordinates: 43°6′15″N 70°39′3″W
- Area: 29 acres (12 ha)
- Built: 1951
- Architect: Hosmer, Calvin Jr.; Hosmer, Marion
- Architectural style: Colonial Revival
- NRHP reference No.: 07001153
- Added to NRHP: October 30, 2007

Brave Boat Harbor Farm is a private historic gentleman's farm at 110 Raynes Neck Road on the coast of York, Maine, United States. Developed in the early 1950s, it consists of a designed horticultural landscape with five structures, the most significant being a Colonial Revival house built at that time. The property was listed on the National Register of Historic Places in 2007.

== Description and history ==
Brave Boat Harbor Farm is located on the north side of Brave Boat Harbor, a tidal inlet on the coast of southern Maine, and on the southeast coast facing the Gulf of Maine. The developed portion of the farm consists of 29 acres (12 ha) of rolling fields, grass meadows, developed garden areas, and a pond; most of the remainder of the property (which is over 100 acres (40 ha)) consists of undeveloped woodland. At the center of developed area are a house, cottage, and cluster of farm buildings, in whose immediate area is a designed garden landscape. All except the cottage were built between 1951 and 1954 in a deliberate homage to colonial-era farmsteads, by Calvin and Marion Hosmer. The property had for generations been in the hands of the Raynes family, but only had a small summer cottage (built about 1939) on it when it was acquired by the Hosmers in 1949. The pond also existed at that time, but was significantly reworked by the Hosmers as part of their landscaping activities.

The main house is a two-story wood-frame structure, clad in stone veneer, with a hip roof and a partial concrete foundation. The house is five bays wide, with sash windows in most of the bays, and a central entrance flanked by sidelight windows, and topped by a transom window, all set under a segmented-arch pediment. The first floor windows are set in openings with slightly arched lintels, and the second-floor windows are set near the eave in the Federal style. The facade details are repeated on the south (ocean-facing) facade, and there are single-story extensions to the sides. The stone for the veneer was all locally gathered.

The barn, built in 1954, is a 1 1/2 story wood-frame structure with a hip roof and a cupola on top. Its main facade is divided into five bays, the central one having rectangular batten doors, and the flanking bays having Dutch doors set under segmented arches with keystone decoration. Other farm-related outbuildings include an equipment shed, and an animal barn for housing cows and chickens.

== See also ==
- National Register of Historic Places listings in York County, Maine
