= John Tarr House =

Historic house in Maine, United States

- U.S. National Register of Historic Places
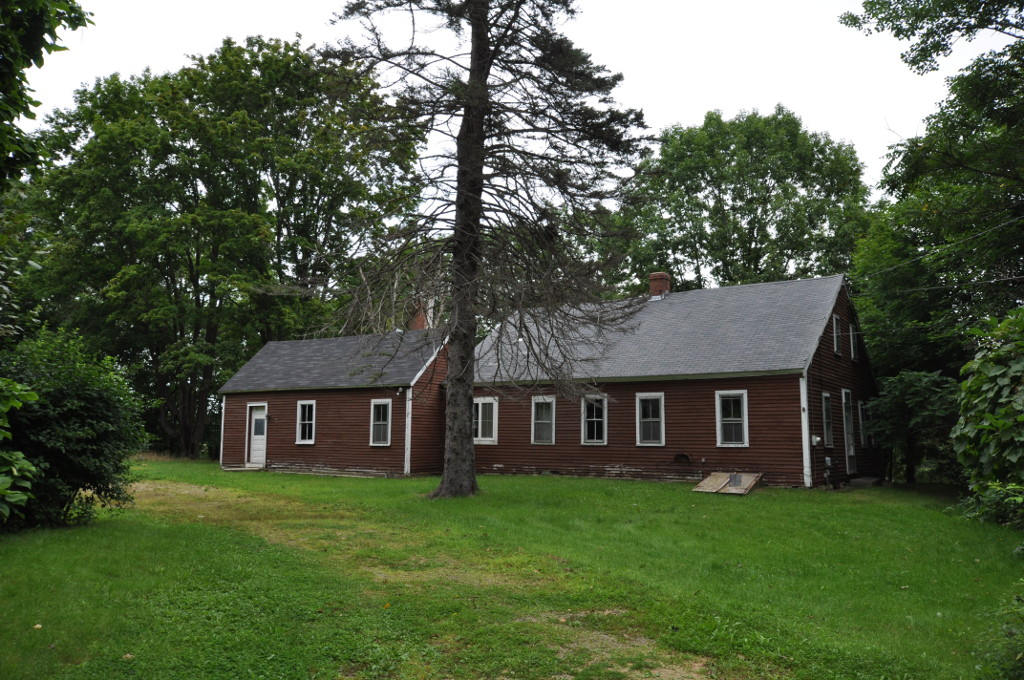
- View of the house's rear

- Location within Maine Location within the United States
- Nearest city: 29 Ferry Lane, Biddeford, Maine
- Coordinates: 43°28′09″N 70°23′54″W
- NRHP reference No.: 80000263
- Added to NRHP: April 23, 1980

The John Tarr House is an historic house at 29 Ferry Lane in Biddeford, Maine. Built about 1730, it is one of the oldest houses in the state of Maine, with a well-preserved interior that has unusual features. The house was listed on the National Register of Historic Places in 1980.

== Description and history ==
The John Tarr House stands facing east toward the Saco River at the end of Ferry Lane, roughly midway between downtown Biddeford and the Biddeford Pool area at the river mouth. It is a 1 1/2-story Cape style timber-frame structure, five bays wide, with a side gable roof, large central chimney, and clapboard siding. The original front entrance is in the center of the east facade, with a secondary entrance (probably a 19th or 20th-century addition) on the south side. The rear facade, facing the street, has five windows. A 1 1/2-story ell extends to the north.

The house is estimated to have been built about 1730, making it one of Maine's oldest surviving structures. In addition to its great age, its significance lies in the original condition of its interior. This includes complete original wall paneling in the parlor spaces, and an unusually finished kitchen space in the rear. The kitchen features completely wainscoted walls and ceiling, something that is only known from two other chambers from New England (one is now in a museum in Concord, Massachusetts, and the other is at the Metropolitan Museum of Art in New York City). The wainscoting panels are hand-planed.

== See also ==
- National Register of Historic Places listings in York County, Maine
