= Waterboro Grange, No. 432 =

- U.S. National Register of Historic Places
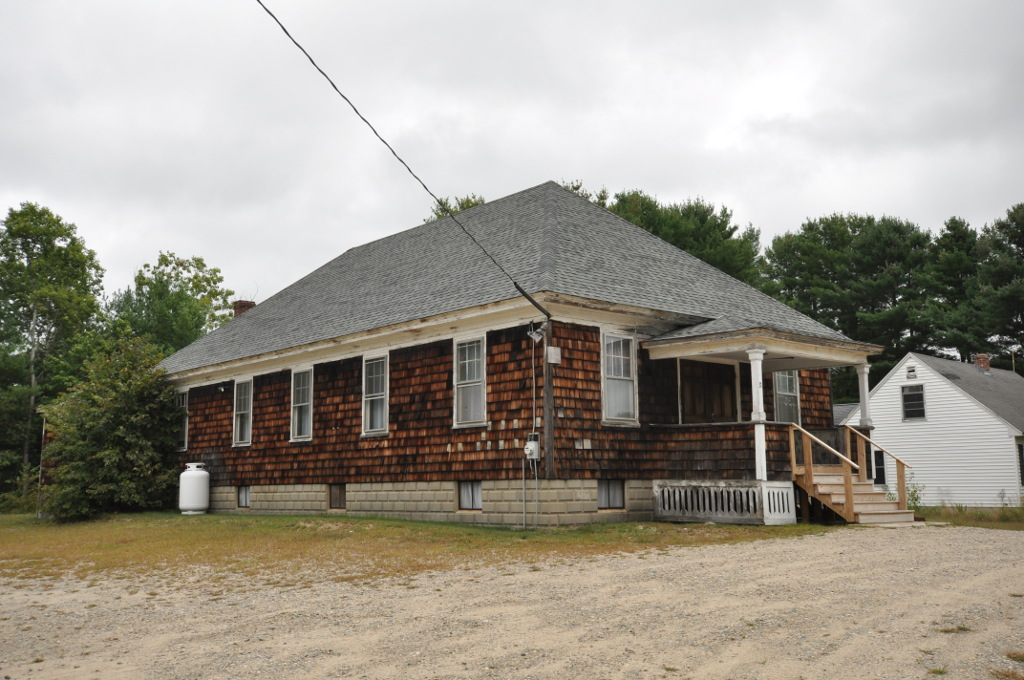

- Location within Maine Location within the United States
- Location: 31 West Rd., Waterboro, Maine
- Coordinates: 43°32′12″N 70°43′4″W
- Area: less than one acre
- Built: 1948
- Architectural style: Craftsman/Bungalow
- NRHP reference No.: 12000230
- Added to NRHP: April 24, 2012

The Waterboro Grange is a historic civic building at 31 West Road in Waterboro, Maine. Built in 1948-50, it is a simplified recreation of a 1920s Craftsman/Bungalow building that was destroyed by a massive wildfire that swept through the region in 1947, and is one of the last Grange halls built in the state. In addition to serving as home to the local Grange organization since then, it has been a major community resource, hosting all manner of social and civic functions. The building was listed on the National Register of Historic Places in 2012.

== Description and history ==
The Waterboro Grange is located on the north side of West Road, a short way west of Waterboro's village center and United States Route 202. It is a single story wood frame structure, with a hip roof, wooden shingle siding, and a concrete block foundation. The rectangular building is oriented with its long axis perpendicular to the road, with the main entrance facing south. The main facade is symmetrical, with sash windows in the outer bays and a central entrance sheltered by a projecting hip-roof porch supported by square columns with simple capitals. The side walls have five windows, spaced symmetrically yet slightly unevenly.

The entrance opens into a wide foyer area, with stairs leading downstairs in one corner to a fully finished basement, and doors providing access to the main hall. Walls are finished in tongue-and-groove wainscoting, with plaster above. Ceilings consist of plaster panels with wooden battens between. The basement space consists of a dining room, kitchen, and storage space.

The Waterboro Grange #432 was established in 1904, and has since then been a mainstay of the rural community. Its first hall, previously used by the Odd Fellows, burned in 1911. The organization's first purpose-built structure was built in 1923; it was a two-story structure, built in a restrained vernacular Craftsman/Bungalow style. After a wildfire devastate the community in 1947, destroying that building among many others, the present single-story structure was built in homage to the earlier hall. The building is now owned by the Waterboro Historical Society; the Grange organization was reported in 2012 to be very small.

== See also ==
- National Register of Historic Places listings in York County, Maine
