= Libby's Colonial Tea Room =

Coordinates: 43.35793°N 70.55938°W

- U.S. National Register of Historic Places
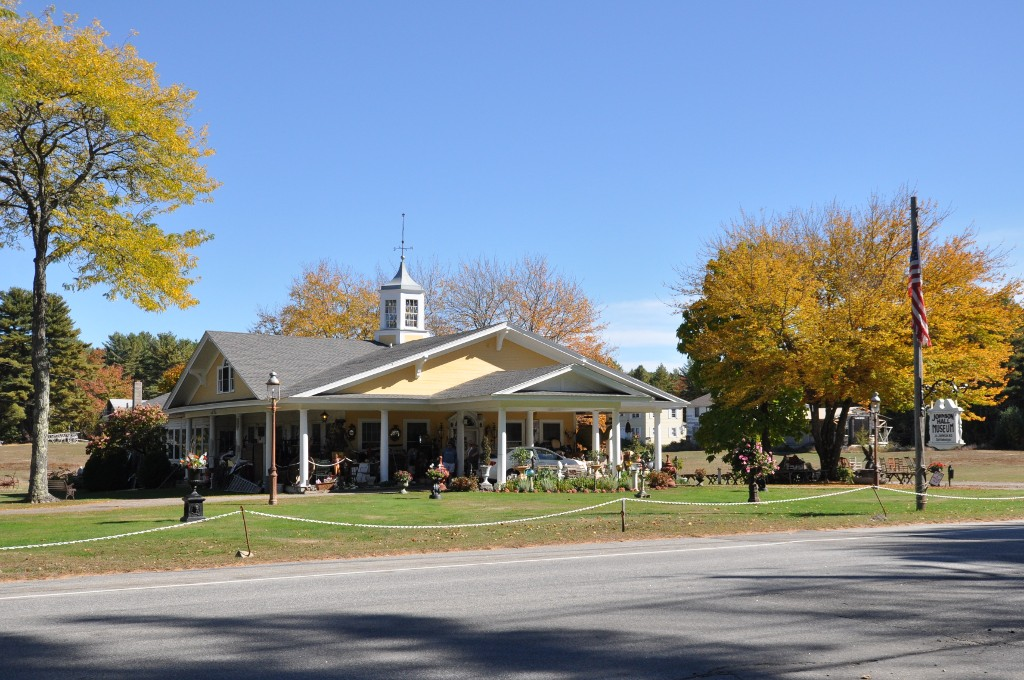

- Location within Maine Location within the United States
- Nearest city: 2713 Post Road, Wells, Maine
- Area: 16 acres (6.5 ha)
- Built: 1923
- Architectural style: Late Victorian, Bungalow/craftsman
- NRHP reference No.: 99000769
- Added to NRHP: January 19, 2001

Libby's Colonial Tea Room is a historic commercial building at 2713 Post Road (United States Route 1) in Wells, Maine. Built in 1922 as a restaurant, the building is now home to the Johnson Hall Museum, a privately run museum of Americana. The building, a rare survivor in the area of automobile-related tourist accommodations from the 1920s, was listed on the National Register of Historic Places in 2001.

== Description and history ==
The Johnson Hall Museum is located on the east side of US Route 1 in northeastern Wells, opposite Harrisecket Road. A semi-circular drive provides access to the low-slung single-story building. It has a broad low-pitch roof with a cross-gable configuration, which extends over a wraparound porch supported by Tuscan columns. A porte-cochere with gable roof projects from the front. The gables of the roof have deep eaves, with large Craftsman-style brackets. The main entrance is at the center of the front facade, flanked by columns and topped by a fanlight and bracketed cornice. The interior is divided into a waiting room with offices and bathrooms to the sides, and a large dining room.

Elsie Klingman Libby operated a restaurant of some sort, probably out of a 19th-century house, at this site until it was destroyed by fire in 1922. She quickly rebuilt, constructing this building to house her establishment. She operated the tea room until 1942, when declining tourism due to World War II brought about its demise. Its guests notably included Franklin Delano Roosevelt, who visited in 1932 while campaigning for president.

The building now houses the Johnson Hall Museum but its future is uncertain. The museum's founder, William “Bill” Johnson, died in 2014, and most of the museum's contents were auctioned off in 2015.

== See also ==
- National Register of Historic Places listings in York County, Maine

The building was constructed in 1923 by Reginald J. Grant: The Howard Johnson like cupola is not original to the building and distracts from the buildings 1920's character and needs to removed. SEE: Kennebunk Star, March 30, 1923, Kennebunk and Vicinity, First Column, 8 down, for verification.
