= Sunnycroft (Limerick, Maine) =

Historic house in Maine, United States

- U.S. National Register of Historic Places
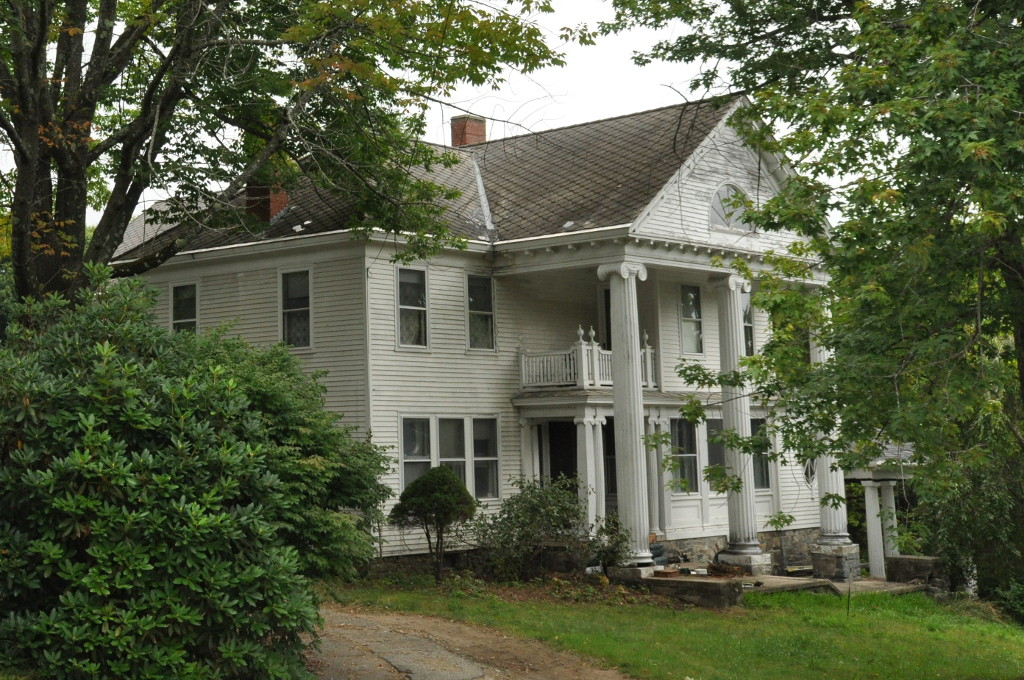

- Location within Maine Location within the United States
- Location: Locust Hill, Limerick, Maine
- Coordinates: 43°41′22″N 70°47′40″W
- Area: 1 acre (0.40 ha)
- Built: 1922
- Architectural style: Colonial Revival
- NRHP reference No.: 84000335
- Added to NRHP: November 8, 1984

Sunnycroft is a historic house on Locust Hill in the center of Limerick, Maine. Built in 1921–22, it is a picturesque and rambling exposition of Colonial Revival architecture. It was listed on the National Register of Historic Places in 1984.

== Description ==
Sunnycroft is a 2 1/2-story wood-frame house, resting on a fieldstone foundation. It is located on Locust Hill, a high spot overlooking the center of Limerick, and its foundation is exposed on the east side. The southern facade has a significantly projecting gabled portico, supported by two-story fluted Doric columns. This portico has a modillioned cornice, and a fanlight window in the gable pediment. Underneath this portico, the main entry is framed by a smaller portico, which is supported by paired Doric columns (one each square and round), and topped by a balustrade with urn-topped posts.

The eastern facade of the house has a porte-cochere. The building has much asymmetrical styling, including semicircular and oval windows, and a number of single-story additions that gives the building a rambling quality, and an architectural sophistication unusual in a rural setting. The house was built by Charles G. Moulton.
