= Sanford (CDP), Maine =

Sanford, Maine
- Census-designated place
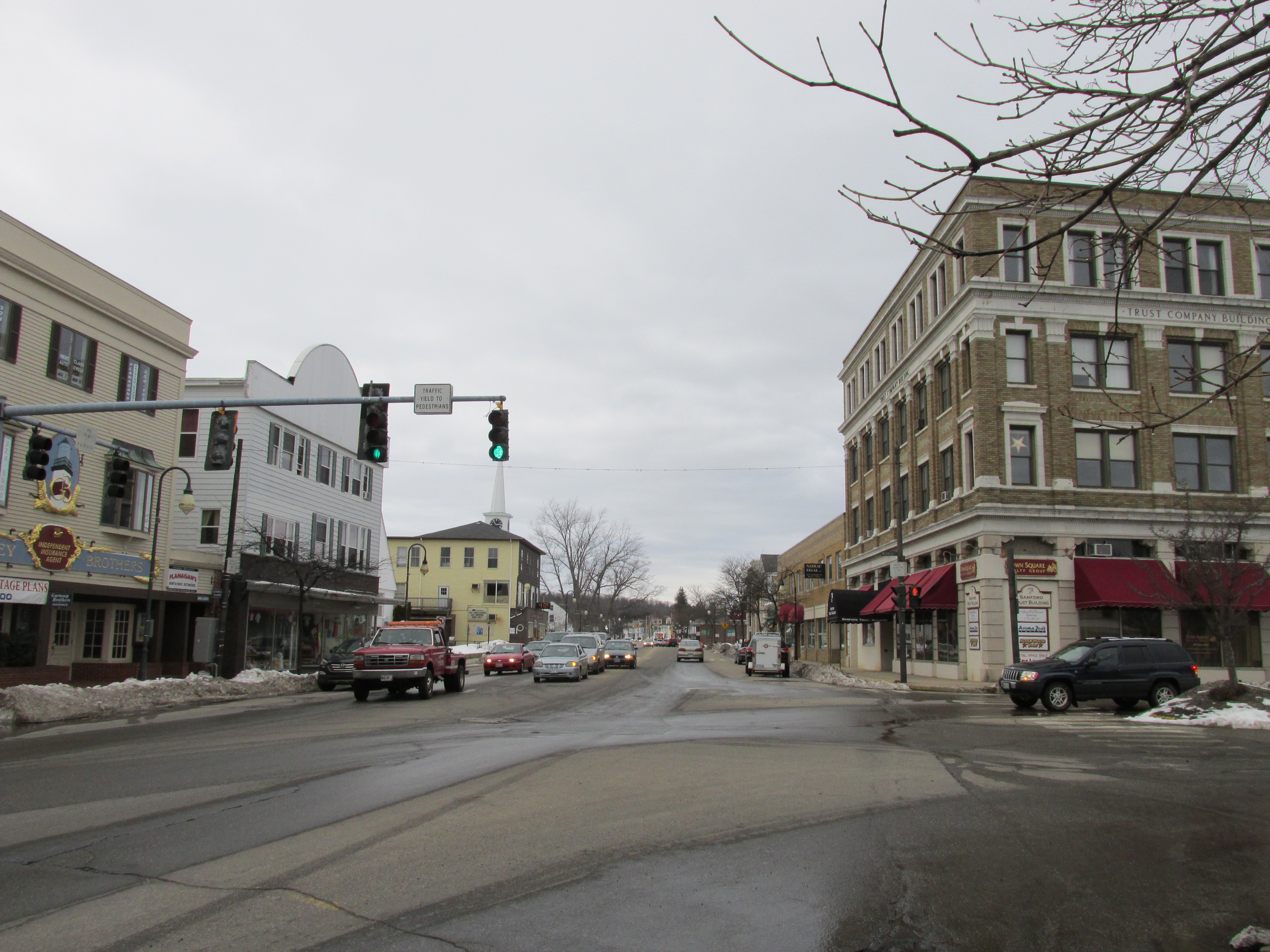
- Main Street

- Location within the state of Maine
- Coordinates: 43°26′24″N 70°46′49″W
- Country: United States
- State: Maine
- County: York

Area
  - Total: 5.2 sq mi (13.5 km^{2})
  - Land: 5.1 sq mi (13.3 km^{2})
  - Water: 0.077 sq mi (0.2 km^{2})
- Elevation: 299 ft (91 m)

Population (2010)
  - Total: 9,761
  - Density: 1,901/sq mi (733.9/km^{2})
- Time zone: UTC-5 (Eastern (EST))
  - Summer (DST): UTC-4 (EDT)
- ZIP code: 04073
- Area code: 207
- FIPS code: (formerly) 23-65725
- GNIS feature ID: 2377953

Sanford is a former census-designated place (CDP) comprising the downtown portion of the city of Sanford in York County, Maine, United States. The population of the CDP was 9,761 at the 2010 census. The CDP was abolished after the town of Sanford reincorporated as a city.

== Geography ==
Sanford is located at 43°26′24″N 70°46′49″W (43.4400724, -70.7801460).

According to the United States Census Bureau, the CDP has a total area of 5.2 mi^{2} (13.5 km^{2}); 5.1 mi^{2} (13.3 km^{2}) of it is land and 0.1 mi^{2} (0.2 km^{2}) of it (1.69%) is water.

== Demographics ==
As of the census of 2000, there were 10,133 people, 4,120 households, and 2,542 families residing in the CDP. The population density was 1,978.0 inhabitants per square mile (763.7/km^{2}). There were 4,338 housing units at an average density of 864.8 per square mile (333.9/km^{2}). The racial makeup of the CDP was 95.58% White, 0.59% African American, 0.35% Native American, 1.92% Asian, 0.01% Pacific Islander, 0.39% from other races, and 1.15% from two or more races. Hispanic or Latino of any race were 1.28% of the population.

There were 4,120 households, out of which 32.0% had children under the age of 18 living with them, 41.8% were married couples living together, 14.8% had a female householder with no husband present, and 38.3% were non-families. 31.3% of all households were made up of individuals, and 13.3% had someone living alone who was 65 years of age or older. The average household size was 2.40 and the average family size was 3.00.

In the CDP, the population was spread out, with 26.7% under the age of 18, 8.6% from 18 to 24, 28.1% from 25 to 44, 20.3% from 45 to 64, and 16.2% who were 65 years of age or older. The median age was 36 years. For every 100 females, there were 90.1 males. For every 100 females age 18 and over, there were 85.9 males.

The median income for a household in the CDP was $29,881, and the median income for a family was $36,278. Males had a median income of $32,917 versus $24,141 for females. The per capita income for the CDP was $16,002. About 16.4% of families and 17.8% of the population were below the poverty line, including 24.2% of those under age 18 and 10.8% of those age 65 or over.
