= Lake Arrowhead =

Lake Arrowhead or Arrowhead Lake may refer to:

== United States ==
=== Bodies of water ===
- Arrowhead Lake (Idaho)
- Lake Arrowhead Reservoir, California
- Lake Arrowhead, Georgia
- Lake Arrowhead (Maine)
- Lake Arrowhead (Texas)

=== Communities ===
- Arrowhead Lake, Cumberland County, New Jersey
- Lake Arrowhead, California
- Lake Arrowhead, Maine
- Lake Arrowhead, Missouri
- Lake Arrowhead, Wisconsin
