= Lake Arrowhead (Maine) =

- Location within Maine Location within the United States
- Location: Limerick / Waterboro, York County, Maine, United States
- Coordinates: 43°39′51″N 70°44′19″W
- Type: Reservoir
- Basin countries: United States
- Surface area: 1,100 acres (450 ha)
- Surface elevation: 305 ft (93 m)
- Settlements: Limerick

Lake Arrowhead is an artificial lake in the towns of Waterboro and Limerick in York County, Maine, United States. The lake is an impoundment on the Little Ossipee River, which flows northeast to the Saco River in Limington. Lake Arrowhead has a surface area of approximately 779 acres (3.15 km^{2}). It is surrounded by the large residential Lake Arrowhead Community.
