= George F. Clifford House =

Historic house in Maine, United States

- U.S. National Register of Historic Places
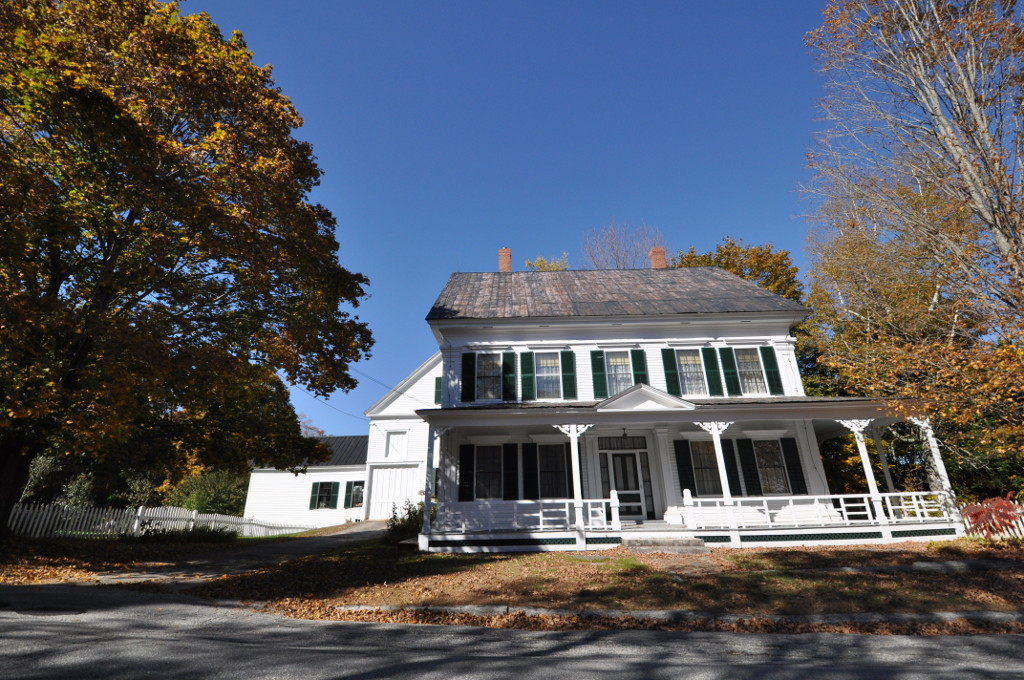

- Location within Maine Location within the United States
- Location: 17 High Road, Cornish, Maine
- Coordinates: 43°48′16″N 70°48′10″W
- Area: less than one acre
- Built: 1873–74
- Architectural style: Greek Revival
- NRHP reference No.: 10000230
- Added to NRHP: April 10, 2010

The George F. Clifford House is a historic house located in Cornish, York County, Maine. Built c. 1874, the house is a high-quality example of Greek Revival style, despite being built nearly 15 years after the style fell out of favor. It was built for George Franklin Clifford, son of United States Supreme Court Justice Nathan Clifford. The property was listed on the National Register of Historic Places on April 10, 2010.

== Description and history ==
The house is set in the main village of Cornish, at the northern side of the junction of High Road and Fiddle Lane. Immediately to the northwest, facing Main Street, stands the Caleb R. Ayer House, the home of George Clifford's uncle, Secretary of State Caleb Ayer.

It is a 2 1/2-story wood-framed structure, with a side gable roof, twin interior chimneys, clapboard siding, and a granite foundation. The south-facing main facade is five bays wide, with paired windows flanking a center entrance with window above. The entrance is set in a recess that is demarcated by pilasters, and includes sidelight windows and a rectangular multi-light transom window. The corners have paneled pilasters, which rise to an entablature and cornice that encircle the building. A hip-roofed, single-story porch extends across the front and around to the east, with a geometrically patterned railing and square posts with scroll-cut brackets. The house is joined via a narrow hyphen to a period carriage house. Its interior retains a high degree of original woodwork and hardware.

According to family history, the house was built for George F. Clifford by his father, United States Supreme Court Associate Justice Nathan Clifford in about 1874; it is not depicted on an 1872 map of the village. The younger Clifford was at that time already in a law partnership with his uncle, Caleb Ayer, and the north-facing secondary entrance faces the Ayer house. It is unclear why the house was built in the Greek Revival style, which had effectively been out of fashion for over ten years.

== See also ==
- National Register of Historic Places listings in York County, Maine
