= Senator Ayer =

Senator Ayer may refer to:

- Caleb Ayer (1813–1883), Maine State Senate
- Claire D. Ayer (born 1948), Vermont State Senate
