= Francis Small =

British-born Colonial American trader and landowner

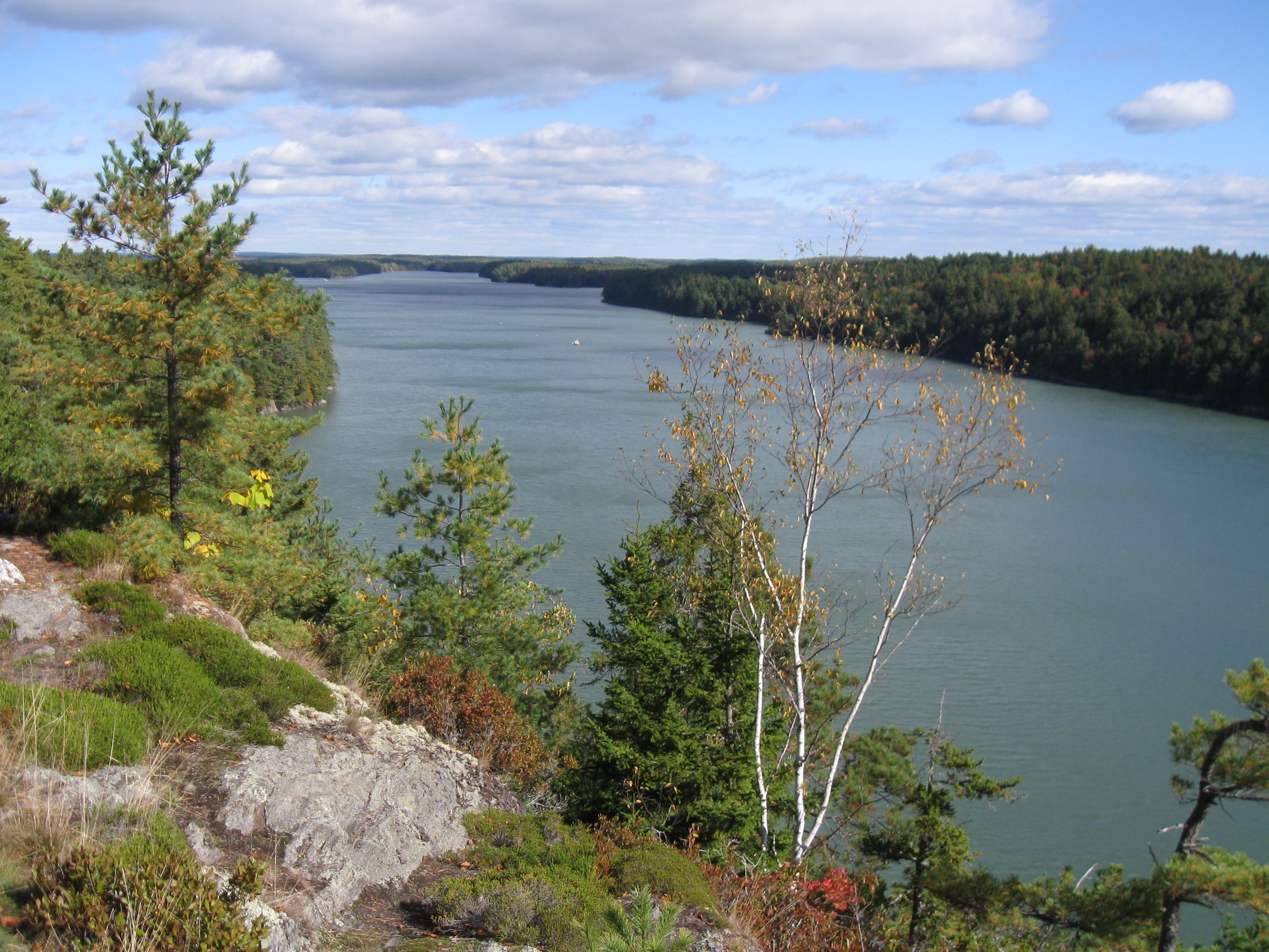
- Sebascodegan Island, Maine
- Born: October 6, 1625
- Died: 1714
- Occupations: Trader and landowner
- Known for: Made the first recorded land purchase in what is now Maine

Francis Small (October 6, 1625 – ca. 1714) was a British-born Colonial American trader and landowner who resided primarily in Kittery, Maine. He made the first recorded land purchase in what is now the state of Maine, then part of Massachusetts, and proceeded to amass so much property that he was called "the great landholder." He owned the most acreage of anyone who ever lived in Maine.

== Life and business ==
Small was born in 1625 to Edward Small and Elizabeth Shearte of Bideford, Devonshire, England, one of six children. He is believed to have arrived in New England with his father about 1632, the sole Small offspring to come to America. In 1648 he was residing in Dover, New Hampshire, and married Elizabeth Leighton of Kittery about 1650. While living in Casco (now Portland, Maine), in 1657, he bought from Scitterygusset, a local Native American sagamore, about 200 acres (80.94 hectares) located on the northern side of Capisic Brook. In 1659, Small established a trading camp on Sebascodegan Island, now part of Harpswell, Maine. By 1668, he resided in Kittery, but operated a trading post (as a squatter) near the confluence of the Ossipee River and Saco River at what is now Cornish, Maine. Here major Indian trails converged—the Sokokis Trail (now Route 5), the Ossipee Trail (now Route 25), and the Pequawket Trail (now Route 113) – a location conducive towards lucrative fur trade with Indians, but also with risks of living isolated in the wilderness.

=== Plot on his life ===
Indeed, Chief Wesumbe (or Captain Sandy), the sagamore of the Newichewannock Abenaki tribe, warned Small of a planned attempt on his life by renegade tribesmen. They owed him payment for goods purchased in the spring on credit, to be settled in the fall with furs. Instead, they decided to erase the debt by killing him at early dawn on a coming day, setting fire to his house and shooting him when he ran out the door. At first Small thought the warning a trick to frighten him away and avoid payment. Just to be on the safe side, however, he took refuge on a nearby hill, from which he could peer through the pines and observe what might transpire. As forewarned, at first light his trading post went up in flames. Small fled, by his account not stopping until he reached Kittery.

=== The Ossipee Tract ===
As compensation for his losses, Chief Wesumbe sold to Small on November 28, 1668, twenty square miles of land (256,000 acres/103,600 hectares) between the Ossipee River, Little Ossipee River, and Newichewannock River (now the Salmon Falls River). The price was two large Indian blankets, two gallons of rum, two pounds of gunpowder, four pounds of musket balls, and twenty strings of Indian beads. The purchase comprised what is called the Ossipee Tract – Limington, Limerick, Cornish (formerly named Francisborough after its early proprietor), Newfield, Parsonsfield and Shapleigh (part of which was later set off as Acton), all today in Maine (despite today’s Ossipee being just west across the border in New Hampshire). Small thereupon sold a half interest in the Ossipee Tract to Major Nicholas Shapleigh, who lived at what is now Eliot, Maine and was then the wealthiest man in the Piscataqua River region.

But Indian unrest flared in 1675–1676 with King Philip's War. English settlements up the coast were attacked and burned until the revolt was quashed. About 1684, Small operated a trading post on Cape Small (which takes its name from him) at the extremity of what is today Phippsburg. During King William's War. However, English settlements in the region were destroyed again in 1689 by Abenaki warriors allied with the forces of New France, which resented encroachment into territory it considered part of Acadia. The area was deserted. Small took part in the Ossipee Excursion in this war.

About 1700, Small moved from Kittery to Truro, Massachusetts to live with his son, Daniel. Major Nicholas Shapleigh died in 1682, followed 32 years later by Small. Then, in 1770, the original unrecorded deed from Wesumbe to Francis Small was found by Small's heirs. Together with the heirs of Shapleigh, in 1772 they appointed a committee to recover the land. Accompanied by a surveyor and chairman, the committee marked what became the towns' boundaries. Represented by an attorney James Sullivan, Small's heirs took possession of Cornish, Limington, Newfield, and half of Limerick, while Shapleigh's heirs took possession of Parsonsfield, Shapleigh, and the remainder of Limerick, the latter town presented by both sets of heirs to Sullivan as his fee.
