= Limington Historic District =

Historic district in Maine, United States

- U.S. National Register of Historic Places
- U.S. Historic district
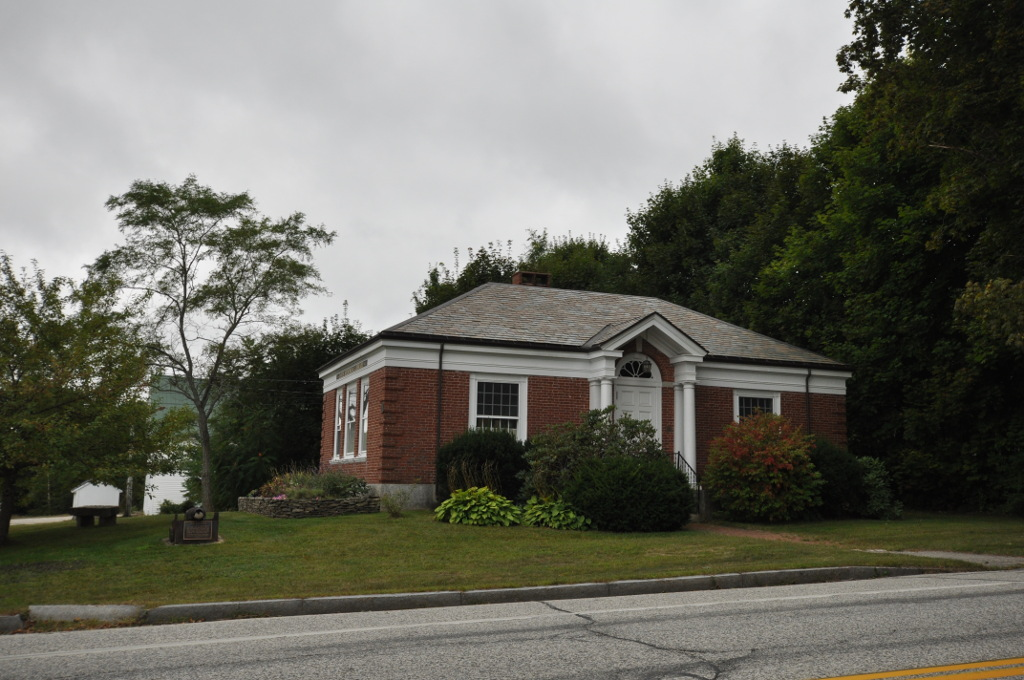
- The library

- Location within Maine Location within the United States
- Location: Jct. of ME 11 and ME 117, Limington, Maine
- Area: 60 acres (24 ha)
- Built: 1790
- Architect: John Calvin Stevens, John Howard Stevens
- Architectural style: Federal, Gothic Revival
- NRHP reference No.: 98001601
- Added to NRHP: January 15, 1999

The Limington Historic District encompasses the historic village center of the rural community of Limington, Maine. Centered at the junction of Maine State Routes 11 and 117, the district includes 24 buildings erected between the late 18th and mid-19th centuries. The district was listed on the National Register of Historic Places in 1999.

== Description and history ==
The town of Limington, located in northern York County, was settled in the 1770s, and its center former at the junction of four large properties owner by early proprietor. Thaddeus Richardson owned the northeast quadrant, and gave land for the Congregational church (whose current Greek Revival building dates to 1835), and that to the northwest by Philemon Libby, whose c. 1794 house still stands. At the southeast corner was the property of Ephraim Clark, who gave land for the town's animal pound, roughly where the 1871 town hall now stands. The southwest property was owned by the Chick family, and is where the library stands, a 1912 design by John Calvin Stevens and his son John Howard Stevens.

Most of the remaining buildings in the district are residential. These are typically wood frame buildings, 1-1/2 or 2-1/2 stories in height, with Federal or Greek Revival styling. A notable exception is the c. 1860 Moody House, which has Italianate brackets. Two buildings were originally used to house retail stores, but have long since been converted to residential use. Non-residential structures include the 1818 Masonic hall, built on the site of a store operated by Philemon Libby, and the c. 1864 Grange hall, which was originally built to house a small clothing factory.

The former Limington Village School (Building 21 on the NRHP Nomination Form) burned in May 2023, and is no longer standing.

== See also ==
- National Register of Historic Places listings in York County, Maine
