= Libby-MacArthur House =

Historic house in Maine, United States

- U.S. National Register of Historic Places
- U.S. Historic district – Contributing property
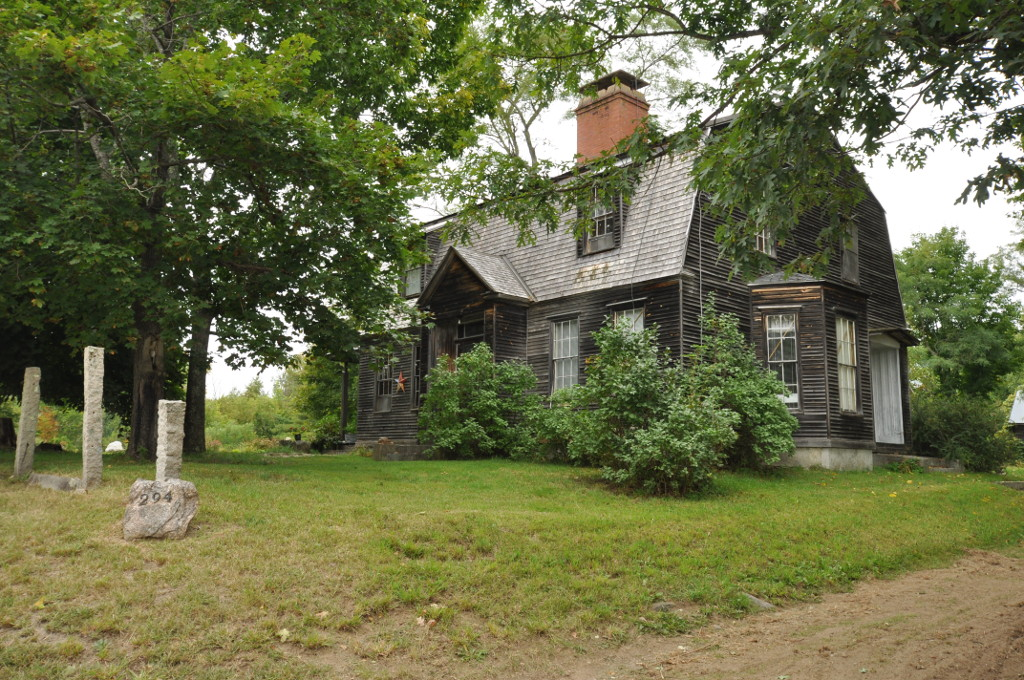

- Location within Maine Location within the United States
- Location: ME 11, Limington, Maine
- Coordinates: 43°43′54″N 70°42′39″W
- Area: 5 acres (2.0 ha)
- Built: 1790
- Architectural style: Federal
- Part of: Limington Historic District (ID80000380)
- NRHP reference No.: 88000397

Significant dates
- Added to NRHP: April 20, 1988
- Designated CP: January 15, 1999

The Libby-MacArthur House is a historic house at 294 Sokokis Avenue (Maine State Route 11) in the center of Limington, Maine. Believed to have been built about 1794, it is the only surviving house of one of the town's earliest permanent residents, and is a rare example in the state of a Federal period house with a gambrel roof. It was listed on the National Register of Historic Places in 1988.

== Description and history ==
The Libby-MacArthur House is located on the north side of Sokokis Avenue, just west of the junction with Cape Road (Maine State Route 117) that defines the center of Limington. It is a 2 1/2-story wood-frame structure, five bays wide, with a gambrel roof, central chimney, and narrow clapboard siding. The main facade, facing south, is symmetrically arranged, with its center entrance set in a Greek Revival vestibule with gable roof. The Federal period entrance surround has been retained inside the vestibule, with sidelight and transom windows. A long two-story ell extends northward from the rear of the house, connecting the house to a c. 1872 barn. The ell continues the Federal period styling found inside the main block, suggesting it was an early addition.

The town of Limington was first settled in the 1770s. The 100-acre (40 ha) parcel at the northwest corner of what is now the town's central intersection was sold by Samuel Small to his daughter Martha and her husband, Philemon Libby, in 1777. Local historians place this house's construction by the Libbys around 1794; they probably lived in a cruder log structure prior to its construction. The house is rare for its gambrel roof, a form typically seen on coastal houses of the Georgian period which had fallen out of fashion by the time this house was built. Their son Abner sold the property in 1836 to Arthur MacArthur, who practiced law in a small law office he built on the property. The house remained in the hands of MacArthur descendants into the 20th century.

== See also ==
- National Register of Historic Places listings in York County, Maine
