= Cornish, Maine =

Town in Maine, United States

- Town
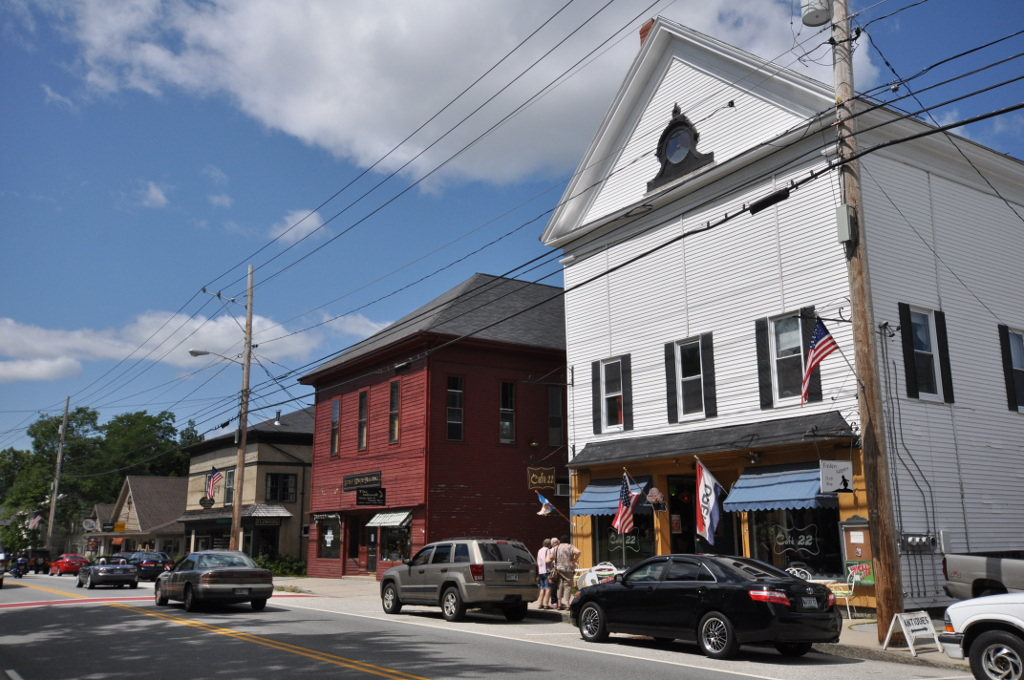
- Downtown Cornish

- Seal
- Nickname: The Crown of York County
- Motto: "Come & Explore Your Next Cherished Memory"
- Location within Maine
- Coordinates: 43°45′06″N 70°48′45″W
- Country: United States
- State: Maine
- County: York
- Incorporated: 1794

Area
  - Total: 22.38 sq mi (57.96 km^{2})
  - Land: 22.18 sq mi (57.45 km^{2})
  - Water: 0.20 sq mi (0.52 km^{2})
- Elevation: 620 ft (190 m)

Population (2020)
  - Total: 1,508
  - Density: 68/sq mi (26.2/km^{2})
- Time zone: UTC-5 (Eastern (EST))
  - Summer (DST): UTC-4 (EDT)
- ZIP code: 04020
- Area code: 207
- FIPS code: 23-14485
- GNIS feature ID: 582421
- Website: www.cornishme.com

Cornish is a town in York County, Maine, United States. The population was 1,508 at the 2020 census. It is part of the Portland-South Portland-Biddeford metropolitan area. The main village in town is the Cornish census-designated place. The village has a number of antique shops and restaurants near historic Thompson Park. Cornish is home to the first concrete bridge in North America.

== History ==
In 1665, a trading post was established by Francis Small in the vicinity of Cornish village, not far from the confluence of the Ossipee River with the Saco River. Here converged three major Abenaki paths—the Sokokis Trail (Route 5), the Ossipee Trail (Route 25) and the Pequawket Trail (Route 113), making it a central location for conducting with Native Americans the lucrative fur trade. In 1668, Small purchased from Newichawannock Chief Captain Sunday (or Wesumbe) the Ossipee Tract, encompassing the present-day towns of Cornish, Parsonsfield, Newfield, Limerick, Limington and Shapleigh (which then included Acton). The price was two large Indian blankets, two gallons of rum, two pounds of gunpowder, four tons of musket balls and twenty strings of Indian beads. Small then sold a half interest in the tract to Major Nicholas Shapleigh of Eliot.

In 1770, heirs discovered the unrecorded deed, and hired attorney James Sullivan of Biddeford to pursue their claim. They won, and paid Sullivan for his services with the township he named Limerick. Small's descendants took possession of Newfield, Limington and Cornish, the latter first named Francisborough, then Francistown, after its original proprietor. Settled by Joseph Thompson in 1782, it was incorporated on February 27, 1794, as Cornish, presumably by settlers from the county of Cornwall, England. The soil was very productive for farming, producing large crops of corn and other types of grain. In 1859, the population was 1,144. The Portland and Ogdensburg Railroad ran up the Saco River valley in the early 1870s, servicing Baldwin Station across the bridge from Cornish.

== Geography ==
According to the United States Census Bureau, the town has a total area of 22.38 square miles (57.96 km^{2}), of which 22.18 square miles (57.45 km^{2}) is land and 0.20 square miles (0.52 km^{2}) is water. Cornish is drained by the Ossipee River and the Saco River. The town's highest point is Clark Mountain, 1,320+ feet (402+ m) above sea level. It is also York County's highest point. The second highest point in the town and county is Hosac Mountain, 1,320 feet (402 m), often mistaken as the highest point in York County.

The town is crossed by state routes 5, 25 and 160. Cornish borders the towns of Hiram to the north, Baldwin to the northeast, Limington to the east, Limerick to the south, and Parsonsfield to the west.

== Demographics ==
Historical population
Census	Pop.	Note	%±
1790	409		—
1800	734		79.5%
1810	971		32.3%
1820	1,088		12.0%
1830	1,235		13.5%
1840	1,263		2.3%
1850	1,144		−9.4%
1860	1,153		0.8%
1870	1,100		−4.6%
1880	1,169		6.3%
1890	1,118		−4.4%
1900	984		−12.0%
1910	954		−3.0%
1920	813		−14.8%
1930	753		−7.4%
1940	826		9.7%
1950	795		−3.8%
1960	816		2.6%
1970	839		2.8%
1980	1,047		24.8%
1990	1,178		12.5%
2000	1,269		7.7%
2010	1,403		10.6%
2020	1,508		7.5%
U.S. Decennial Census

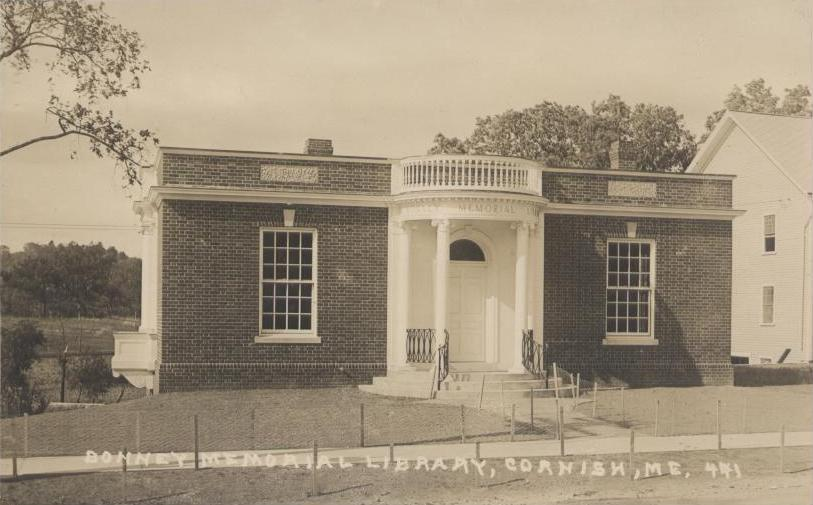
Bonney Memorial Library, c. 1920

=== 2010 census ===
A the 2010 census, there were 1,403 people, 609 households and 405 families living in the town. The population density was 63.3 inhabitants per square mile (24.4/km^{2}). There were 692 housing units at an average density of 31.2 per square mile (12.0/km^{2}). The racial makeup of the town was 98.4% White, 0.4% African American, 0.3% Native American, 0.1% Asian, 0.5% from other races, and 0.3% from two or more races. Hispanic or Latino of any race were 1.1% of the population.

There were 609 households, of which 27.1% had children under the age of 18 living with them, 51.7% were married couples living together, 10.3% had a female householder with no husband present, 4.4% had a male householder with no wife present, and 33.5% were non-families. 27.4% of all households were made up of individuals, and 10.9% had someone living alone who was 65 years of age or older. The average household size was 2.29 and the average family size was 2.75.

The median age in the town was 44.5 years. 20.7% of residents were under the age of 18; 6.1% were between the ages of 18 and 24; 23.7% were from 25 to 44; 32.9% were from 45 to 64; and 16.6% were 65 years of age or older. The gender makeup of the town was 50.7% male and 49.3% female.

=== 2000 census ===
At the 2000 census, there were 1,269 people, 521 households and 340 families living in the town. The population density was 57.4 inhabitants per square mile (22.2/km^{2}). There were 588 housing units at an average density of 26.6 per square mile (10.3/km^{2}). The racial makeup of the town was 98.35% White, 0.24% African American, 0.16% Native American, 0.39% Asian, 0.08% from other races, and 0.79% from two or more races. Hispanic or Latino of any race were 0.55% of the population.

There were 521 households, of which 29.6% had children under the age of 18 living with them, 52.2% were married couples living together, 9.0% had a female householder with no husband present, and 34.7% were non-families. 29.0% of all households were made up of individuals, and 14.4% had someone living alone who was 65 years of age or older. The average household size was 2.43 and the average family size was 3.00.

24.8% of the population were under the age of 18, 4.5% from 18 to 24, 28.1% from 25 to 44, 26.4% from 45 to 64, and 16.2% who were 65 years of age or older. The median age was 40 years. For every 100 females, there were 95.2 males. For every 100 females age 18 and over, there were 92.0 males.

The median household income was $38,125 and the median family income was $46,477. Males had a median income of $31,853 compared with $25,625 for females. The per capita income for the town was $17,494. About 9.3% of families and 13.7% of the population were below the poverty line, including 15.8% of those under age 18 and 18.4% of those age 65 or over.

== Local schools ==
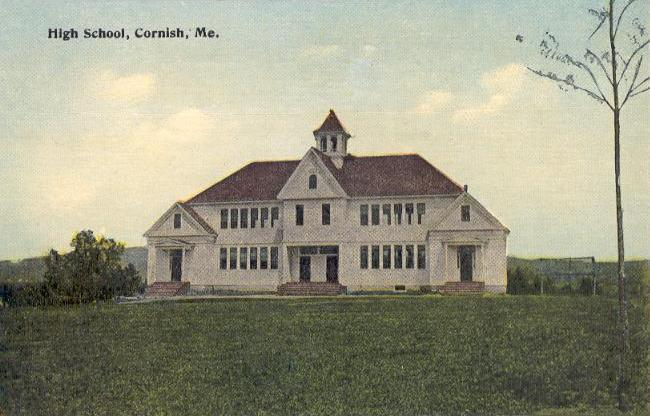
Old High School in 1915

- Sacopee Valley Elementary School
- Sacopee Valley Middle School
- Sacopee Valley High School

== Sites of interest ==
- Cornish Historical Society and Museum
- Caleb R. Ayer House
- George F. Clifford House
- Odd Fellows-Rebekah Hall
- LeRoy F. Pike Memorial Building

== Notable people ==
- Caleb R. Ayer, 19th century state senate president and Secretary of State
- David Dunn, 18th governor of Maine
- Eddie Files, baseball pitcher
- David Hammons, US congressman
- Joseph Hammons, US congressman from New Hampshire
- Steve Letarte, former NASCAR Sprint Cup Series crew chief for Dale Earnhardt Jr.
