= Shapleigh, Maine =

Town in Maine, United States

- Town
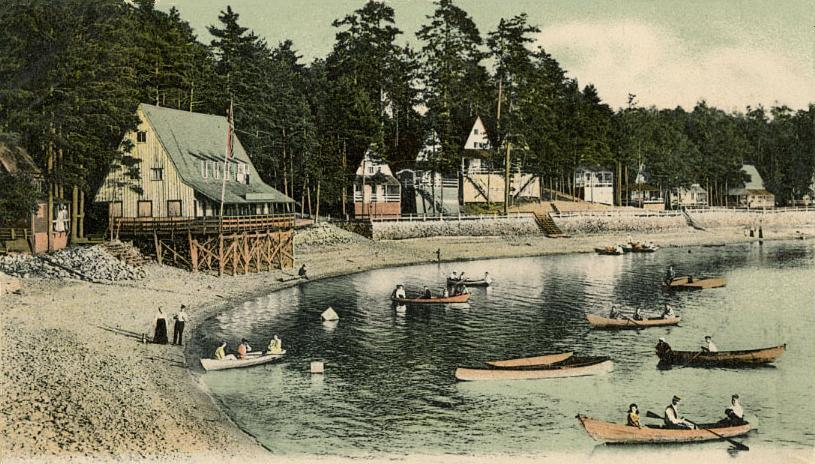
- Mousam Lake in 1905

- Location within Maine Location within the United States
- Coordinates: 43°33′12″N 70°50′16″W
- Country: United States
- State: Maine
- County: York
- Incorporated: 1785

Government
  - Type: Town Meeting

Area
  - Total: 41.19 sq mi (106.68 km^{2})
  - Land: 38.75 sq mi (100.36 km^{2})
  - Water: 2.44 sq mi (6.32 km^{2}) 5.92%
- Elevation: 715 ft (218 m)

Population (2020)
  - Total: 2,921
  - Density: 75/sq mi (29.1/km^{2})
- Time zone: UTC-5 (Eastern)
  - Summer (DST): UTC-4 (Eastern)
- ZIP Code: 04076
- Area code: 207
- FIPS code: 23-67475
- GNIS feature ID: 582722
- Website: www.shapleigh.net

Shapleigh (/ˈʃæpli/, SHAP-lee) is a town in York County, Maine, United States which was incorporated as the state's 43rd town in 1785. The population was 2,921 at the 2020 census. Shapleigh is divided into the villages of North Shapleigh, Shapleigh Corner, Ross Corner and Emery Mills. It is part of the Portland–South Portland–Biddeford, Maine metropolitan statistical area.

== History ==
In 1668, Chief Captain Sunday (or Wesumbe) of the Newichawannock Abenaki tribe deeded Francis Small the Ossipee Tract, which included Cornish, Parsonsfield, Newfield, Limerick, Limington and Shapleigh. Small, a trader from Kittery, then sold a half interest to Major Nicholas Shapleigh of Eliot. In 1770, heirs discovered the unrecorded deed and made claim. Shapleigh's heirs took Parsonsfield, Shapleigh and one half of Limerick.

First called Hubbardstown, it was settled in 1772 when Simeon Emery erected a sawmill at the foot of Mousam Pond. On March 5, 1785, the town was incorporated as Shapleigh, named for its early proprietor. In 1830, Shapleigh's west half was set off and incorporated as Acton. In 1846, a portion of Shapleigh was annexed by Newfield. Shapleigh annexed an eastern portion of land from Waterboro in 1854.

There were sawmills in Emery Mills, Shapleigh Corner and North Shapleigh, which also had a woolen textile factory (known as Hargraves Woolen Mill) and leather board factory. For a few years beginning in 1837, iron was produced at a blast furnace in North Shapleigh from bog iron retrieved from Little Ossipee Pond. Foundations, walls, and slag remained at the site at the time of a 2003 Maine Geological Survey publication on the site. Shapleigh was one of the Maine towns devastated by the Great Fires of 1947.

In 2009, Shapleigh residents (along with those of Newfield) successfully opposed the industrial-scale drawing of water from its aquifer by Nestlé, operating under the Poland Spring brand.

== Geography ==
According to the United States Census Bureau, the town has a total area of 41.19 square miles (106.68 km^{2}), of which 38.75 square miles (100.36 km^{2}) is land and 2.44 square miles (6.32 km^{2}) is water. Shapleigh is drained by the Little Ossipee River and Mousam River. All of Shapleigh's woodlands are protected by The Nature Conservancy.

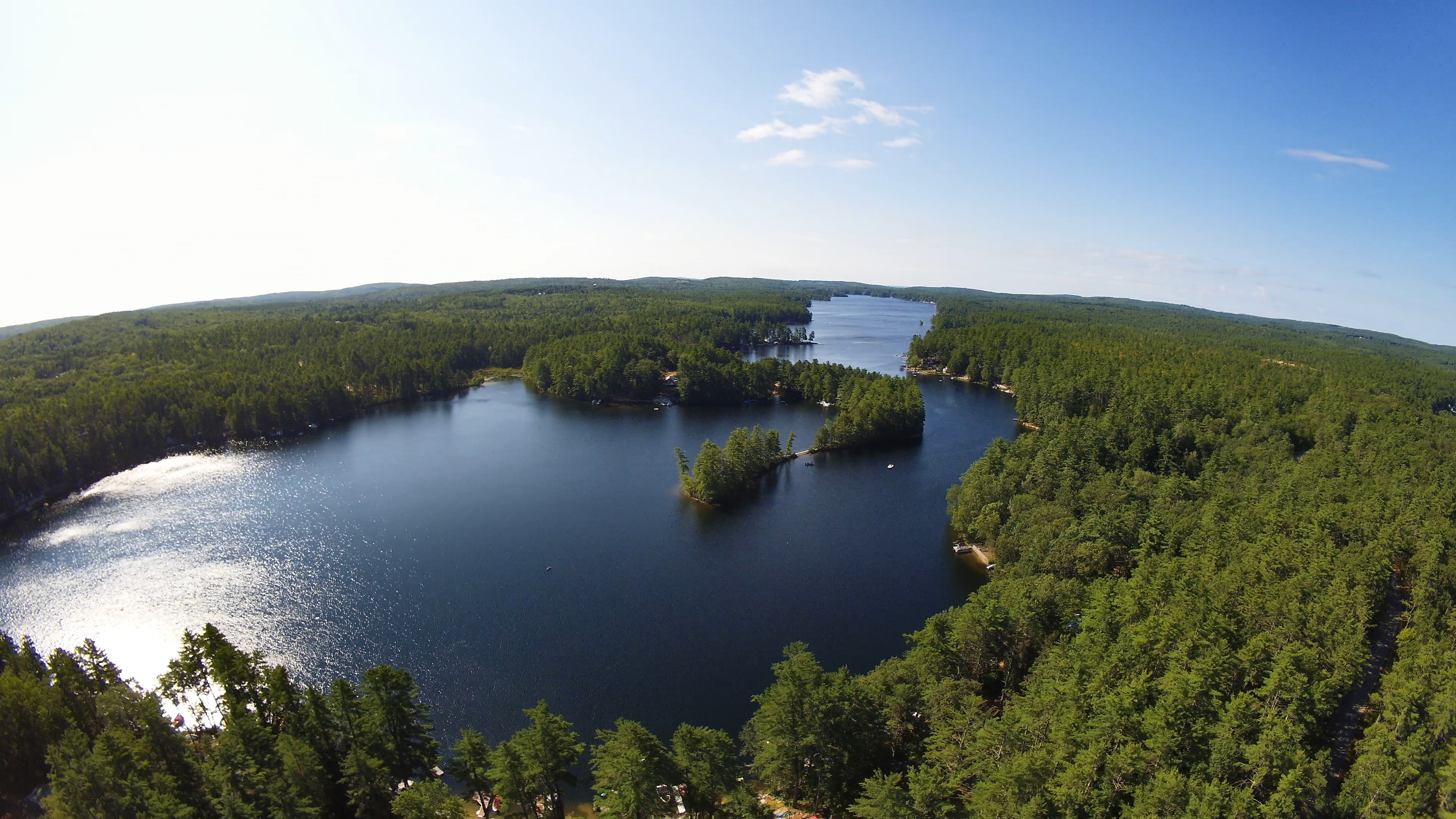
Aerial view over Mousam Lake. Shapleigh surrounds the north end, and Acton is in the distance on the right.

The town has three mountains over 1,000 feet (300 m): Fort Ridge, Abbott Mountain and an unnamed mountain (1,017 feet; 310 m) located a half mile northwest of Abbott Mountain. Fort Ridge, with its highest summit at 1,114 feet (340 m) above sea level, is the town's highest mountain. Abbott Mountain, which is often mistaken to be the highest point in town, rises to an elevation of 1,078 feet (329 m), making it the town's second highest point. Due to its local popularity as a hiking destination, high traffic from all terrain vehicles (ATV) and the resulting erosion from overuse, the actual elevation of Abbott Mountain's ground-down summit is estimated to be closer to 1,060 feet in elevation.

The town is served by state routes 11 and 109. It borders Acton to the west, Waterboro to the east, Alfred to the southeast, Newfield to the north, and Sanford to the south.

== Demographics ==
Historical population
Census	Pop.	Note	%±
1790	1,320		—
1800	1,778		34.7%
1810	2,362		32.8%
1820	2,815		19.2%
1830	1,479		−47.5%
1840	1,510		2.1%
1850	1,348		−10.7%
1860	1,273		−5.6%
1870	1,087		−14.6%
1880	1,128		3.8%
1890	968		−14.2%
1900	847		−12.5%
1910	691		−18.4%
1920	457		−33.9%
1930	530		16.0%
1940	290		−45.3%
1950	531		83.1%
1960	515		−3.0%
1970	559		8.5%
1980	1,370		145.1%
1990	1,911		39.5%
2000	2,326		21.7%
2010	2,668		14.7%
2020	2,921		9.5%
U.S. Decennial Census

=== 2010 census ===
As of the census of 2010, there were 2,668 people, 1,072 households, and 766 families living in the town. The population density was 68.9 inhabitants per square mile (26.6/km^{2}). There were 2,036 housing units at an average density of 52.5 per square mile (20.3/km^{2}). The racial makeup of the town was 96.6% White, 0.3% African American, 0.5% Native American, 0.7% Asian, 0.1% from other races, and 1.8% from two or more races. Hispanic or Latino of any race were 0.8% of the population.

There were 1,072 households, of which 29.4% had children under the age of 18 living with them, 57.5% were married couples living together, 8.6% had a female householder with no husband present, 5.4% had a male householder with no wife present, and 28.5% were non-families. 19.9% of all households were made up of individuals, and 6.8% had someone living alone who was 65 years of age or older. The average household size was 2.49 and the average family size was 2.85.

The median age in the town was 43.6 years. 21% of residents were under the age of 18; 7% were between the ages of 18 and 24; 23.8% were from 25 to 44; 35.3% were from 45 to 64; and 12.8% were 65 years of age or older. The gender makeup of the town was 50.4% male and 49.6% female.

=== 2000 census ===
As of the census of 2000, there were 2,326 people, 912 households, and 673 families living in the town. The population density was 59.9 inhabitants per square mile (23.1/km^{2}). There were 1,813 housing units at an average density of 46.7 per square mile (18.0/km^{2}). The racial makeup of the town was 98.41% White, 0.21% African American, 0.13% Native American, 0.43% Asian, 0.21% from other races, and 0.60% from two or more races. Hispanic or Latino of any race were 0.90% of the population.

There were 912 households, out of which 30.9% had children under the age of 18 living with them, 63.2% were married couples living together, 6.6% had a female householder with no husband present, and 26.1% were non-families. 19.2% of all households were made up of individuals, and 7.6% had someone living alone who was 65 years of age or older. The average household size was 2.54 and the average family size was 2.90.

In the town, the population was spread out, with 24.1% under the age of 18, 6.4% from 18 to 24, 29.2% from 25 to 44, 26.0% from 45 to 64, and 14.4% who were 65 years of age or older. The median age was 40 years. For every 100 females, there were 101.0 males. For every 100 females age 18 and over, there were 101.4 males.

The median income for a household in the town was $42,026, and the median income for a family was $45,591. Males had a median income of $34,519 versus $26,739 for females. The per capita income for the town was $19,331. About 2.9% of families and 4.5% of the population were below the poverty line, including 4.3% of those under age 18 and 7.3% of those age 65 or over.

== Education ==
Shapleigh students attend Shapleigh Memorial School which is a part of Regional School Unit 57. Students in grades 6–8 from Shapleigh attend Massabesic Middle School, and students in grades 9–12 attend Massabesic High School, both of which are in Waterboro.

== General information ==
- One post office: zip code 04076
- Telephone exchanges: 793 and 636
- Two fire stations:
  - Shapleigh Fire Department. shapleighfiredepartment.com
  - Ross Corner Fire Company (privately owned)

== Sites of interest ==
- Acton-Shapleigh Historical Society & Museum
- Shapleigh Woods-Waterboro Barrens

== Notable people ==
- Frank Abbott, dentist, author, president of the American Dental Association (1888)
- Levi J. Ham, politician and surgeon
- Bruce McMillan, children's book author, photo-illustrator, and watercolor artist
- Joshua Maria Young, bishop of Erie, Pennsylvania
