= Willowbrook Museum Village =

Open-air museum in Newfield, Maine

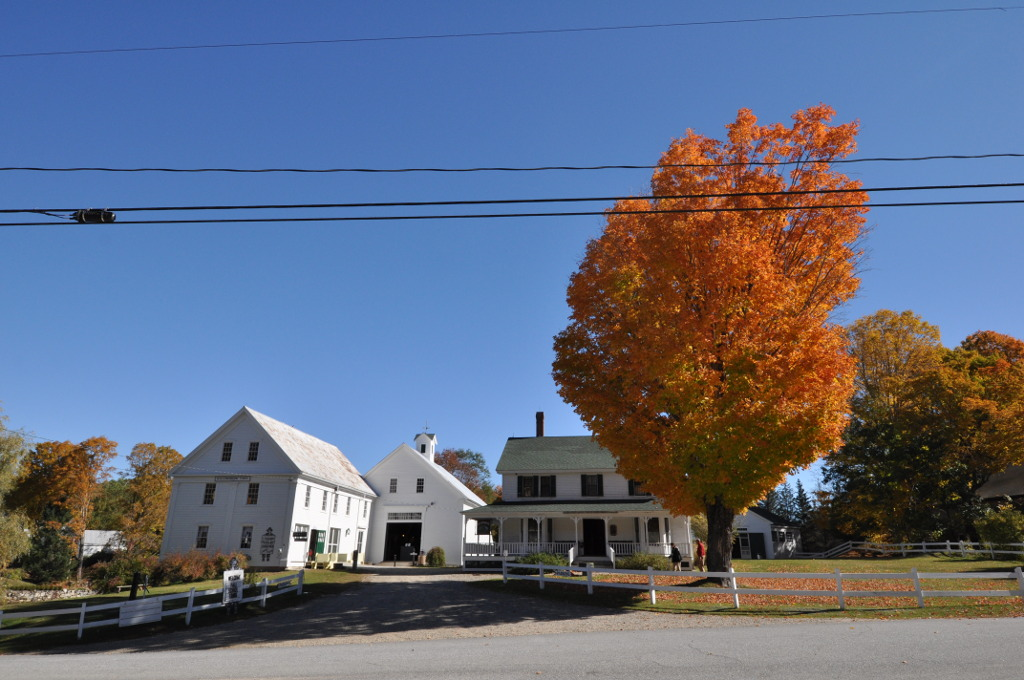
- Location: Newfield, Maine
- Type: Living history
- Website: www.willowbrookmuseum.org
- Newfield (Willowbrook) Historic District
- U.S. National Register of Historic Places
- U.S. Historic district
- Location within Maine Location within the United States
- Location: Elm St., Newfield, Maine
- Coordinates: 43°39′18″N 70°51′7″W
- Area: 8 acres (3.2 ha)
- Architectural style: Greek Revival, Late Victorian
- NRHP reference No.: 85000275
- Added to NRHP: February 14, 1985

19th Century Willowbrook Village was an open-air museum encompassing a former 19th-century village in Newfield, Maine. It is located north of the town center on Elm Street, on approximately 10 acres (4.0 ha), with 34 buildings. It was open 10 a.m. to 5 p.m., 5 days each week from the Saturday of Memorial Day weekend through October, closed Tuesdays and Wednesdays. Much of the museum property is listed on the National Register of Historic Places as the Newfield (Willowbrook) Historic District.

== Description and history ==
Willowbrook Village is located just south of Chellis Brook, and north of the village center. It includes a mill pond that was made by damming the brook, and a collection of buildings located both north and south of the pond. This area was the historic town center of Newfield, until the area was devastated by a wildfire in 1947, which did extensive damage in this area of York County.

In the 1960s Massachusetts resident Don King began purchasing the properties surrounding the mill pond, and began restoring the buildings and other artifacts he had accumulated. The museum opened on May 1, 1970.

On October 10, 2016, 19th Century Willowbrook Village closed permanently after struggling with costs for many years. On January 1, 2017, ownership of the former Willowbrook Museum transferred to Curran Homestead Village at Fields Pond & Newfield. This museum is currently expanding its offering at its home campus located at 372 Fields Pond Rd., Orrington, ME. The museum's mission emphasizes experiential, hands-on learning activities connected with science, technology, engineering, art, and mathematics (STEAM) with a working collection of 19th and early 20th century artifacts. At the Fields Pond location, the museum is currently developing a museum village scenario similar to former Willowbrook Museum. The museum in Newfield is closed.

== Collections ==
One of the main buildings in the museum collection is its general store, Amos Straw Country Store, a fine Greek Revival structure with a meeting hall on the second floor constructed in the 1850s. Connected with the store is a large center aisle threshing floor-type barn used for exhibition of artifacts. There are five buildings at the site of the National Register of Historic Places. Other buildings in the collection include the William Durgin House and ell (1813), Durgin Barn, Letterpress Printing Shop, One-Room Schoolhouse (Replica of the 1839 Fenderson Schoolhouse, Parsonsfield), an 1870s Cider Mill, Johnathan Pike Cooperage, Granary, Hands-On History Building, Tom Flagg Smithy (moved from Lincolnville, ME), and others. Also, in the collection, is an 1894 Armitage-Herschell carousel, housed in a round barn structure representative of the tent once used when the carousel was set-up at an amusement at public gatherings in York and Cumberland counties, ME, from 1896 to 1922), and a collection of 1850s -1920s artifacts that include: carriages, sleighs, agricultural equipment, early gas engines, tractors, trades tools and equipment, medical instruments and equipment, furnishings, store merchandise, and more. Classes in traditional arts, including blacksmithing, knife making, woodworking, metal casting, and more are regularly offered.

== See also ==
- National Register of Historic Places listings in York County, Maine
