= East Waterboro, Maine =

- Village
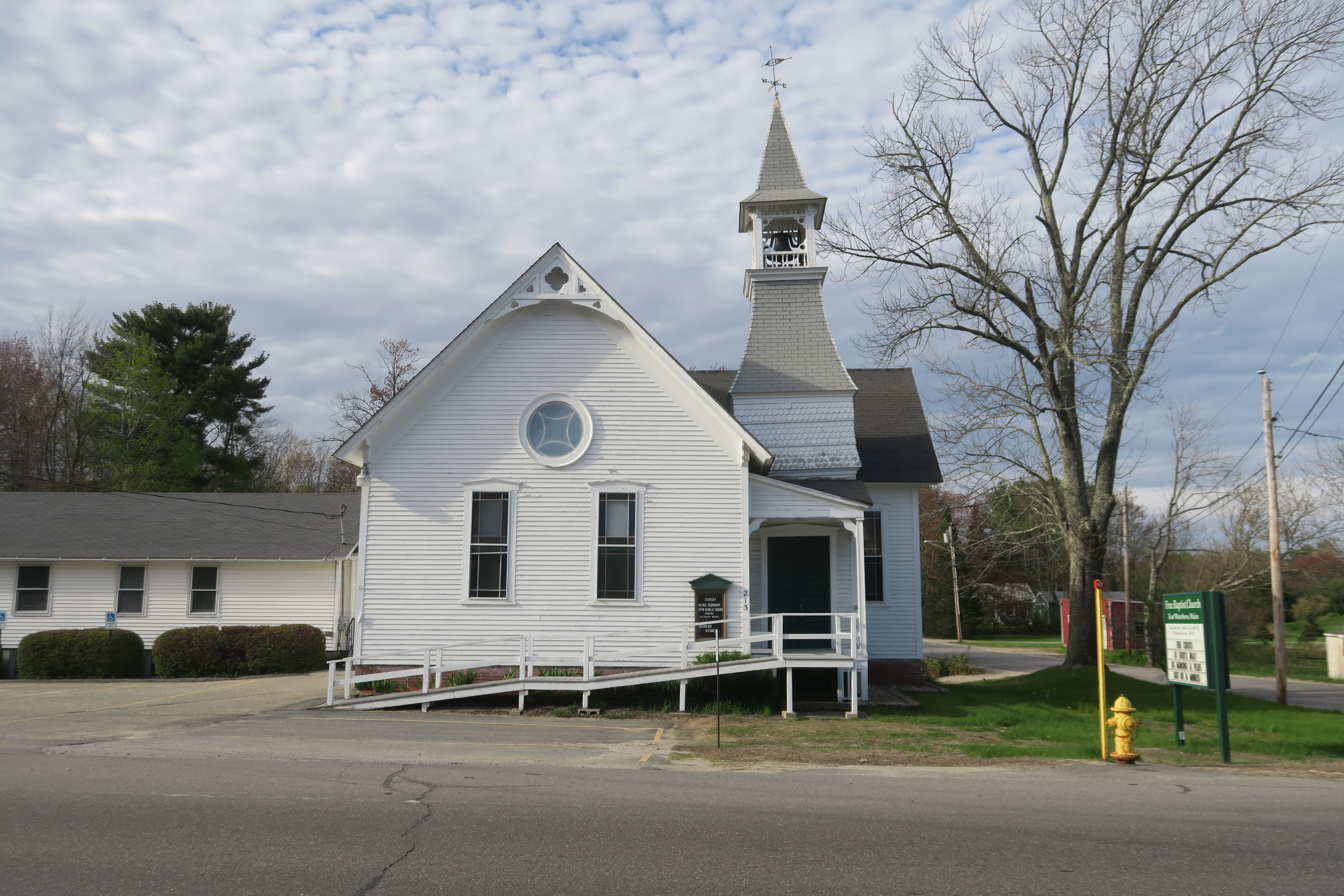
- Free Baptist Church

- Location within Maine
- Coordinates: 43.572°N 70.682°W
- Country: United States
- State: Maine
- County: York
- Elevation: 243 ft (74 m)
- Time zone: UTC-5 (Eastern (EST))
  - Summer (DST): UTC-4 (EDT)
- ZIP code: 04030
- Area code: 207
- GNIS feature ID: 579278

East Waterboro is an unincorporated village in the town of Waterboro, York County, Maine, United States. The community is located at the junction of U.S. Route 202, Maine State Route 4, and Maine State Route 5. East Waterboro has a post office, with ZIP code 04030.
