= Odd Fellows-Rebekah Hall (Cornish, Maine) =

- U.S. National Register of Historic Places
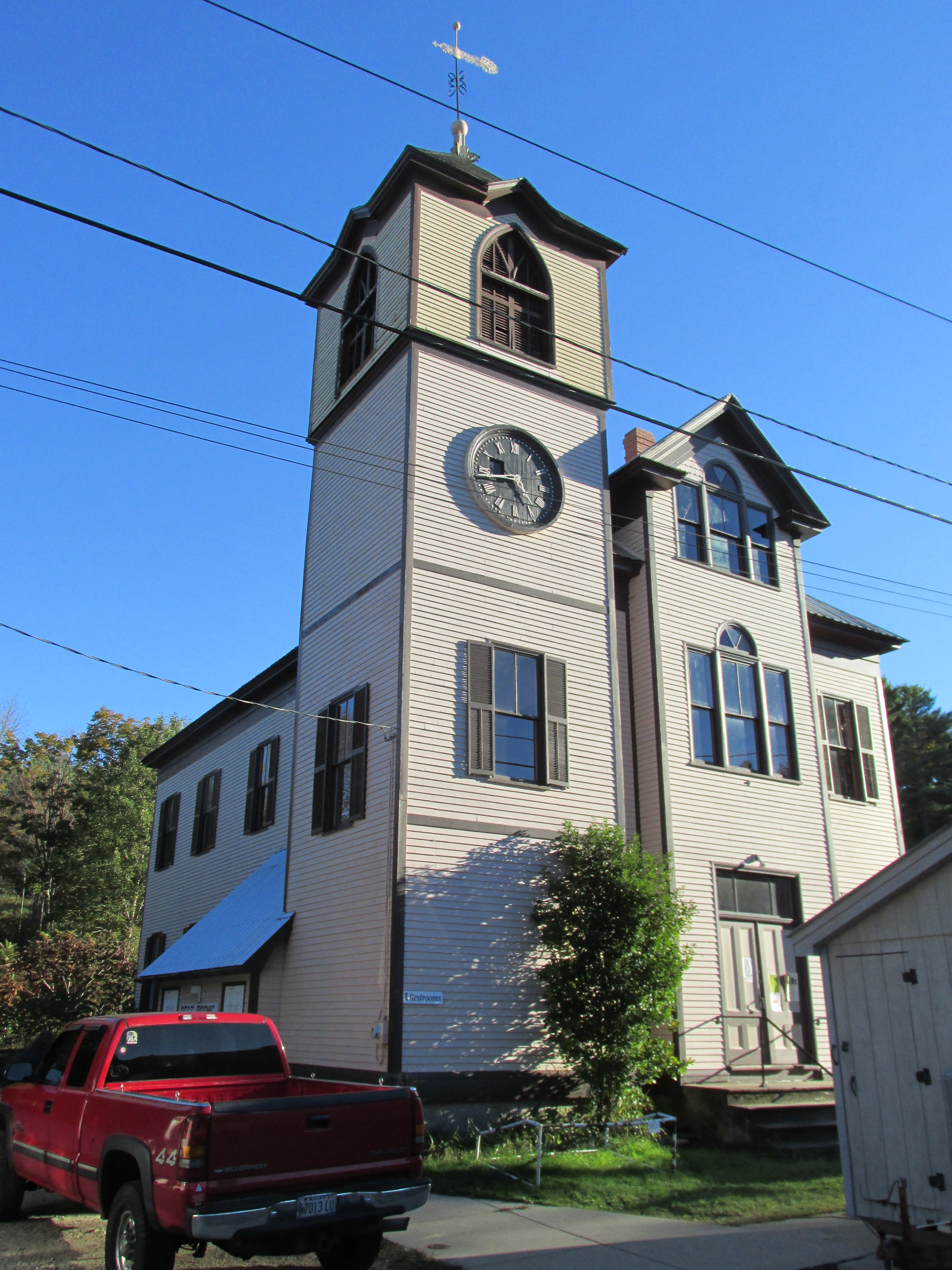
- Odd Fellows-Rebekah Hall

- Location within Maine Location within the United States
- Location: High St., Cornish, Maine
- Coordinates: 43°48′14″N 70°48′12″W
- Area: 0.3 acres (0.12 ha)
- Built: 1902; 124 years ago
- NRHP reference No.: 83003704
- Added to NRHP: December 29, 1983

The Odd Fellows-Rebekah Hall is a historic form fraternal society hall on High Street in Cornish, Maine. Built in 1902 for the local chapter of the International Order of Odd Fellows and their associated Rebekah women's chapter, it is an architecturally eclectic mix of vernacular and high-style elements. It was listed on the National Register of Historic Places in 1983, and now functions as a community meeting space.

== Description and history ==
The Cornish Odd Fellows Hall is set on the south side of High Road, opposite a small park at the triangular junction of High Street, Main Street, and McCubrey Way in the town center. It is a 2 1/2-story wood-frame structure, roughly rectangular, with a steeply pitched hip roof and clapboard siding. Facing roughly northwest, its northern corner has a four-story tower with a clock at the third level and Gothic lancet-arched windows at the fourth level, with a pyramidal roof. A three-story gabled pavilion projects at the center of the main facade, with a double-door entrance on the first floor and Colonial Revival Palladian windows on the second and third floors. The interior of the building has tongue-and-groove wainscoting, molded architrave trim, and a painted pressed-metal ceiling.

Built in 1902 by local craftsmen, the building is unusual in the state as a rural example of large-scale distinctive vernacular architecture. It was used by the Odd Fellows until the 1940s, and by the Rebekahs until the 1960s, after which it was sold to the town. It is now used as a community meeting and event space.

== See also ==
- National Register of Historic Places listings in York County, Maine
