= Frank Abbott (dentist) =

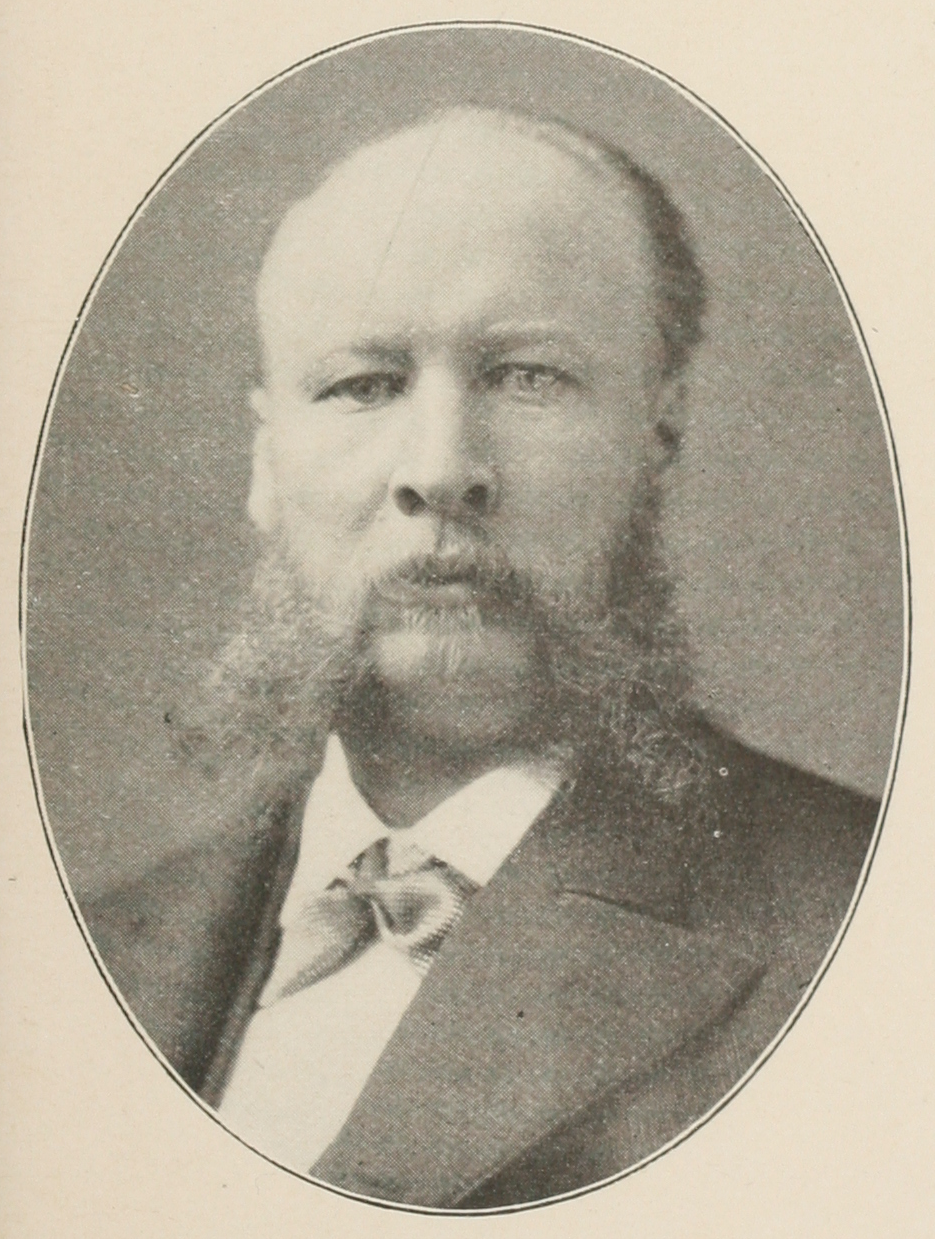
Frank Abbott

Frank Abbott (September 5, 1836 – April 20, 1897) was an American dentist who served president of the American Dental Association (1888) and the National Association of Dental Faculties (1895). He invented several of dental instruments such as various types of chisels, pluggers, excavators and scalers, some of which are still in use in the 21st century.

== Background ==
Born to a transplanted English family, Abbott attended local schools in York County, Maine and farmed in Shapleigh, Maine until the age of 16, when he began to travel. Beginning in 1855, he studied dentistry under Dr. J.E. Ostrander in Oneida, New York. At age 22, Abbott opened his own dental practice in Johnstown, New York, and married Catherine Ann Cuyler, with whom he had three children.

Upon the outbreak of the American Civil War, Abbott served as a lieutenant of the 115th New York Volunteer Infantry and was captured at Harper's Ferry, West Virginia. He was released from captivity as part of a prisoner exchange.

== Dental career ==
After the Civil War, Abbott returned to his practice. A year later, he matriculated as a medical student at the University of the City of New York. While there, Abbott was appointed as clinical lecturer in New York College of Dentistry (1866), as Professor of Operative Dentistry (1868) and as dean (1869).

From 1894 - 1895, Abbott failed in attempts to have the trustees there establish a Chair of Pathology and Bacteriology (with his son as incumbent) and to have the University of New York regents replace an act of incorporation of the college with a new regent-approved charter.

Abbott also invented the first automatic mallet with an effective back-action. He also collected rare American history prints.

== Notable publications ==
- Light vs. Heavy Gold Foil and Crystal Gold
- Transactions of the American Dental Association, 1870, pp. 130–33
- Indigestion, It's Causes and Effects
- Translations of the State Dental Society of New York, 1875, pp. 39–48
- Caries of the Teeth
- Dental Cosmos, XXI, 1879, pp. 56–64, 113-25, 177-84
- Pericementitis (Perostitis), Its Causes and Treatment
- Dental Cosmos, XXV, 1883, pp. 418–23
- Microscopical Studies upon the Absorption of the Roots of Temporary Teeth
- Translations of the State Dental Society of New York, 1884, pp. 45–53
- Hyperostosis of Roots of Teeth
- Transactions of the American Dental Association, 1886, pp. 105–24
- Odontoblasts in Their Relation to Developing Dentine, 1888, pp. 112–22
- Odontoblasts in Their Relation to Developing Dentine, 1889, pp. 39–53
- Growth of Enamel
- Dental Pathology and Practice (1896 textbook)
