= Cape Small =

Cape on the coast of Maine, United States

Coordinates: 43.71203°N 69.84477°W

Cape Small is a cape in the eastern part of Casco Bay on the Maine coast of the United States. It is located in Sagadahoc County near Phippsburg. It is generally agreed that it was named for Francis Small, who was the largest landowner in Maine's history.
