= Regional School Unit 57 =

School district in York County, Maine, United States

Address
- 86 West Road Waterboro, ME 04087
- Coordinates: 43°35′N 70°46′W

District information
- Grades: PK–12
- Superintendent: Stephen Marquis
- Asst. superintendent(s): Amanda Doyle
- Schools: 7
- NCES District ID: 2314670

Students and staff
- Students: 2,868 (2024–25)
- Teachers: 238.47 (on an FTE basis)
- Student–teacher ratio: 12.03

Other information
- Website: www.rsu57.org

Regional School Unit 57 (RSU 57), formerly known as Maine School Administrative District 57 (MSAD 57), is a school district in Maine. The district office is located in Waterboro, Maine, next to Massabesic High School. Its current superintendent is Dr. Stephen Marquis.

== Schools ==
RSU 57 is in charge of the seven schools in the district, its buses, and the athletic fields:

School	Location
Alfred Elementary School	Alfred
Line Elementary School	Limerick and Newfield
Lyman Elementary School	Lyman
Shapleigh Memorial School	Shapleigh
Waterboro Elementary School	Waterboro
Massabesic Middle School	Waterboro
Massabesic High School	Waterboro

== Programs ==
RSU 57 offers a selection of programs for students as well as adults, such as:

- Massabesic Adult and Community Education (M.A.C.E.)
- Summer School Programs
- Community Events
- Holiday Fairs
- Sports activities

== Media ==
RSU 57 programs a local educational access channel, Massabesic TV, which is seen on Time Warner Cable channel 16 and MetroCast channel 2 within the district area.

== See also ==
- List of school districts in Maine
