= Massabesic High School =

- Massabesic High School building

Location
- 88 West Road; Waterboro, Maine 04087; United States; 43°32′13″N 70°43′28″W

Information
- Type: Public
- Established: 1969
- School district: RSU 57
- Principal: Ty Thurlow
- Grades: 9–12
- Enrollment: 898 (2023–2024)
- Campus size: 2 buildings
- Campus type: suburban
- Colors: Green, white, gold
- Athletics: football, basketball, soccer, baseball, softball, wrestling, track and field, swimming, lacrosse, tennis, golf, cheerleading, field hockey, ice hockey, cross country, Special Olympics
- Athletics conference: Western and Southern Maine depending on sport, class varies depends on sport
- Mascot: Mustang horse
- Website: highschool.rsu57.org/o/mhs

Massabesic High School, Pronounced "mass-uh-BEE-sik" is a public high school located in Waterboro, Maine, United States. The school is part of the RSU 57 school system, which serves six southwestern Maine towns with a combined population of approximately 22,000 residents: Alfred, Limerick, Lyman, Newfield, Shapleigh and Waterboro.

The school is split into two separate buildings: the West Building which serves most of the students in all grades, and the East Building which serves most of the upperclassmen (grades 11 and 12) and special education classes.

== History ==
The name Massabesic came from a Native American language that was spoken in the area before Europeans settled in the area. Massabesic High School was first opened in 1969 with an enrollment of over nine hundred students within grades nine through twelve. Over the years, the school has had enrolled around 1000 students per school year.

=== East Building expansion ===
On August 29, 2007, Massabesic High School occupied the former Massabesic Junior High School building and declared it the East Building, expanding the high school and eliminating overcrowding problems.

The East Building contains the foreign language department and the NJROTC program. It is also the adult education center for RSU 57.

== Key facts ==
- MHS is a member of the MASC
- Previous dramatic overcrowding (with some class sizes exceeding 30) was almost eliminated with the opening of the Freshman Academy in August 2007. This helped solve some of the overcrowding issues, but some classes still must be held in portable trailers.
- Known for some epic cafeteria food fights in the 1980's.

== Sports ==
=== Athletic ===
Massabesic High School's team name for all of its athletic teams is called the Massabesic Mustangs.

- In 2000, the Massabesic Mustangs football team won the Class A state championship with a 12–0 season.

=== Non-athletic ===
- Massabesic High school's Odyssey of the Mind team finished at the top of its division in the 2005 Odyssey of the Mind World Finals.

== See also ==
- List of high schools in Maine
