= Waterboro, Maine =

- Town
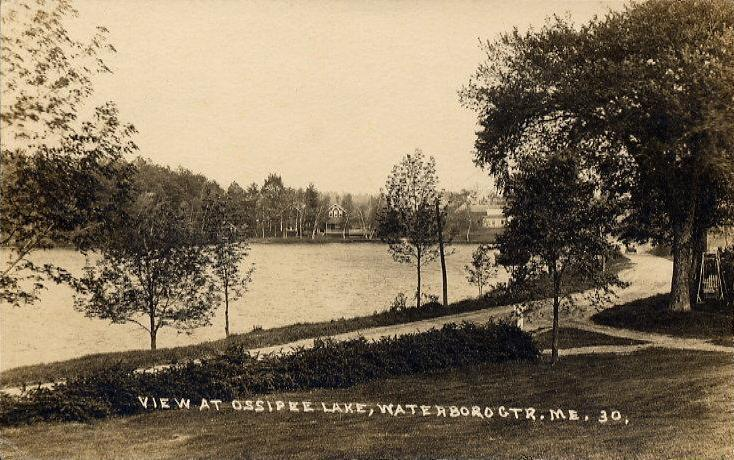
- Little Ossipee Lake

- Location within Maine Location within the United States
- Coordinates: 43°37′30″N 70°43′56″W
- Country: United States
- State: Maine
- County: York
- Incorporated: 1787

Government
  - Type: Board of Selectmen - Town Meeting

Area
  - Total: 57.16 sq mi (148.04 km^{2})
  - Land: 55.33 sq mi (143.30 km^{2})
  - Water: 1.83 sq mi (4.74 km^{2})
- Elevation: 650 ft (200 m)

Population (2020)
  - Total: 7,936
  - Density: 143/sq mi (55.4/km^{2})
- Time zone: UTC-5 (Eastern (EST))
  - Summer (DST): UTC-4 (EDT)
- ZIP Codes: 04087 (Waterboro); 04061 (North Waterboro); 04030 (East Waterboro)
- Area code: 207
- FIPS code: 23-80530
- GNIS feature ID: 582793
- Website: www.waterboro-me.gov

Waterboro is a town in York County, Maine, United States. The population was 7,936 at the 2020 census. It is part of the Portland-South Portland-Biddeford metropolitan area.

The town includes the districts of North (04061), South (04087), and East (04030) Waterboro, in addition to the largest development in southern Maine, Lake Arrowhead Community. The introduction of Maine subdivision regulation, and Maine Planning Boards, is the direct result of the creation of the largest subdivision, Lake Arrowhead Community. The reaction of the Maine State Legislature was mandatory Planning Boards, and subdivision regulation.

== History ==
Abenaki people called the area Massabesic, meaning "the place of much water", a reference to the region's lakes. It was part of an extensive tract of land purchased in 1661 by Major William Phillips of Saco from Chief Fluellin. Known as Massabesic Plantation, it included most of modern-day Waterboro, Alfred and Sanford. Phillips died in 1683, and the plantation eventually passed from his heirs to 10 proprietors. One of those proprietors was Colonel Joshua Waters, for whom the town would be named.

Lumbering began to thrive there about 1764. Captain John Smith from Kittery was the first permanent settler, arriving in 1768. On March 6, 1787, the Massachusetts General Court incorporated the township as Waterborough. In 1790, Old Corners became the site of the Court of General Sessions, although in 1805 the county seat shifted to Alfred. In 1895, the name was shortened to Waterboro.

With land particularly suited for livestock grazing, agriculture became a principal industry. The town had many cattle and dairy farms. The Portland and Rochester Railroad passed through Waterboro and connected to Rochester, New Hampshire, in 1871, helping spur development. Rivers and brooks provided water power to operate mills. Several sawmills were established, and by 1886, the town produced about 1,800,000 feet (550,000 m) of lumber annually. Other businesses included the Ossipee Manufacturing Company at the Little Ossipee River, which made blankets, and the Steam Mill Company at South Waterboro, which made wooden boxes. In 1922, the Goodall-Sanford Mills built in Waterboro village a spinning mill, taken over by a patent leather manufacturer that operated from 1939 to 1982.

Fire twice devastated the town. In 1911, a large portion of South Waterboro burned. Then during the Great Fires of 1947, three-quarters of Waterboro's land area burned, including the town center and 90% of the cottages on Little Ossipee Lake. Today, Waterboro's lakes remain a popular recreation area. The town is home to the 2,140-acre (870 ha) Waterboro Barrens, one of the largest and best preserved pitch pine barrens in Maine.

On October 16, 2012, an M4.0 earthquake shook the city and the rest of Maine. It also shook New Hampshire, Massachusetts and most of the New England states.

== Geography ==
According to the United States Census Bureau, the town has a total area of 57.16 square miles (148.04 km^{2}), of which 55.33 square miles (143.30 km^{2}) is land and 1.83 square miles (4.74 km^{2}) is water. Lake Arrowhead, named by land developers in the 1960s, is on the northern border of the town. Waterboro is drained by the Little Ossipee River. Little Ossipee Lake, the largest body of water, covers 564 acres (228 ha). Ossipee Mountain, elevation 1058 feet (322 m) above sea level, is the highest point in the town.

Waterboro is served by U.S. Route 202 and state routes 4 and 5. It borders the towns of Alfred to the southwest, and Lyman to the southeast, Hollis to the northeast, Limerick and Limington to the north, Newfield to the northwest, and Shapleigh to the west.

== Demographics ==
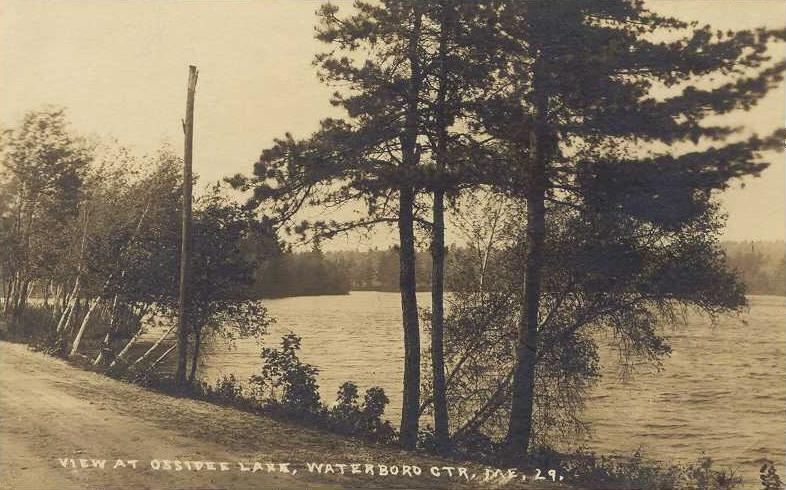
Little Ossipee Lake in 1910

Historical population
Census	Pop.	Note	%±
1790	971		—
1800	1,253		29.0%
1810	1,395		11.3%
1820	1,762		26.3%
1830	1,814		3.0%
1840	1,944		7.2%
1850	1,989		2.3%
1860	1,824		−8.3%
1870	1,548		−15.1%
1880	1,482		−4.3%
1890	1,357		−8.4%
1900	1,169		−13.9%
1910	997		−14.7%
1920	942		−5.5%
1930	914		−3.0%
1940	947		3.6%
1950	1,071		13.1%
1960	1,059		−1.1%
1970	1,208		14.1%
1980	2,943		143.6%
1990	4,510		53.2%
2000	6,214		37.8%
2010	7,693		23.8%
2020	7,936		3.2%

=== 2010 census ===
As of the census of 2010, there were 7,693 people, 2,775 households, and 2,095 families living in the town. The population density was 139.0 inhabitants per square mile (53.7/km^{2}). There were 3,574 housing units at an average density of 64.6 per square mile (24.9/km^{2}). The racial makeup of the town was 97.3% White, 0.1% African American, 0.2% Native American, 0.6% Asian, 0.1% from other races, and 1.2% from two or more races. Hispanic or Latino of any race were 0.9% of the population.

There were 2,775 households, of which 41.1% had children under the age of 18 living with them, 60.8% were married couples living together, 9.5% had a female householder with no husband present, 5.2% had a male householder with no wife present, and 24.5% were non-families. 16.9% of all households were made up of individuals, and 5.2% had someone living alone who was 65 years of age or older. The average household size was 2.77 and the average family size was 3.12.

The median age in the town was 36.6 years. 27.7% of residents were under the age of 18; 6.8% were between the ages of 18 and 24; 29.5% were from 25 to 44; 27.9% were from 45 to 64; and 8.2% were 65 years of age or older. The gender makeup of the town was 50.8% male and 49.2% female.

=== 2000 census ===
As of the census of 2000, there were 6,214 people, 2,211 households, and 1,704 families living in the town. The population density was 111.9 inhabitants per square mile (43.2/km^{2}). There were 2,828 housing units at an average density of 50.9 per square mile (19.7/km^{2}). The racial makeup of the town was 98.66% White, 0.11% African American, 0.32% Native American, 0.21% Asian, 0.14% from other races, and 0.55% from two or more races. Hispanic or Latino of any race were 0.68% of the population.

There were 2,211 households, out of which 43.0% had children under the age of 18 living with them, 64.3% were married couples living together, 8.6% had a female householder with no husband present, and 22.9% were non-families. 15.9% of all households were made up of individuals, and 5.7% had someone living alone who was 65 years of age or older. The average household size was 2.81 and the average family size was 3.15.

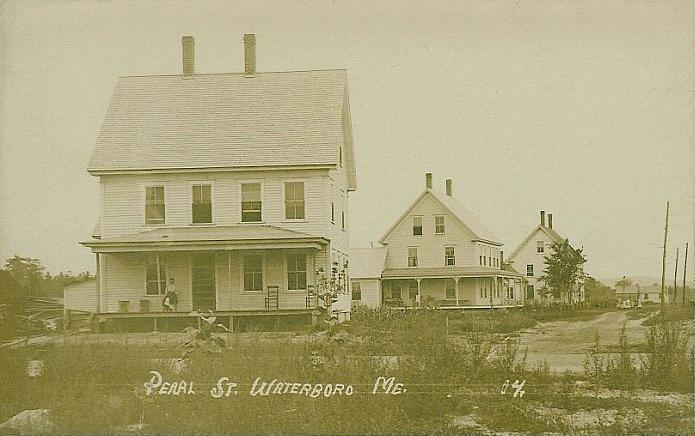
Pearl Street in 1912

In the town, the population was spread out, with 30.8% under the age of 18, 6.5% from 18 to 24, 35.9% from 25 to 44, 19.8% from 45 to 64, and 7.0% who were 65 years of age or older. The median age was 33 years. For every 100 females, there were 102.0 males. For every 100 females age 18 and over, there were 99.5 males.

The median income for a household in the town was $43,234, and the median income for a family was $46,667. Males had a median income of $33,583 versus $21,904 for females. The per capita income for the town was $17,813. About 3.4% of families and 6.1% of the population were below the poverty line, including 7.4% of those under age 18 and 7.8% of those age 65 or over.

== Notable person ==
- Amos L. Allen, US congressman

== Education ==
Waterboro is home to Massabesic High School, Massabesic Middle School, and the Waterboro Elementary School. The town is part of Regional School Unit 57 (RSU 57), a regional school district also encompassing five other towns: Alfred, Limerick, Lyman, Newfield, and Shapleigh.

Massabesic Junior High was converted into Massabesic High School's Freshmen Academy in 2007, after the Massabesic Middle School was built. Massabesic Middle School also has a wing which includes the sixth grade from Waterboro Elementary School. The Districts' mascot is the "Mustangs."

== Sites of interest ==
- James Leavitt House
