= James Leavitt House =

Historic house in Maine, United States

- U.S. National Register of Historic Places
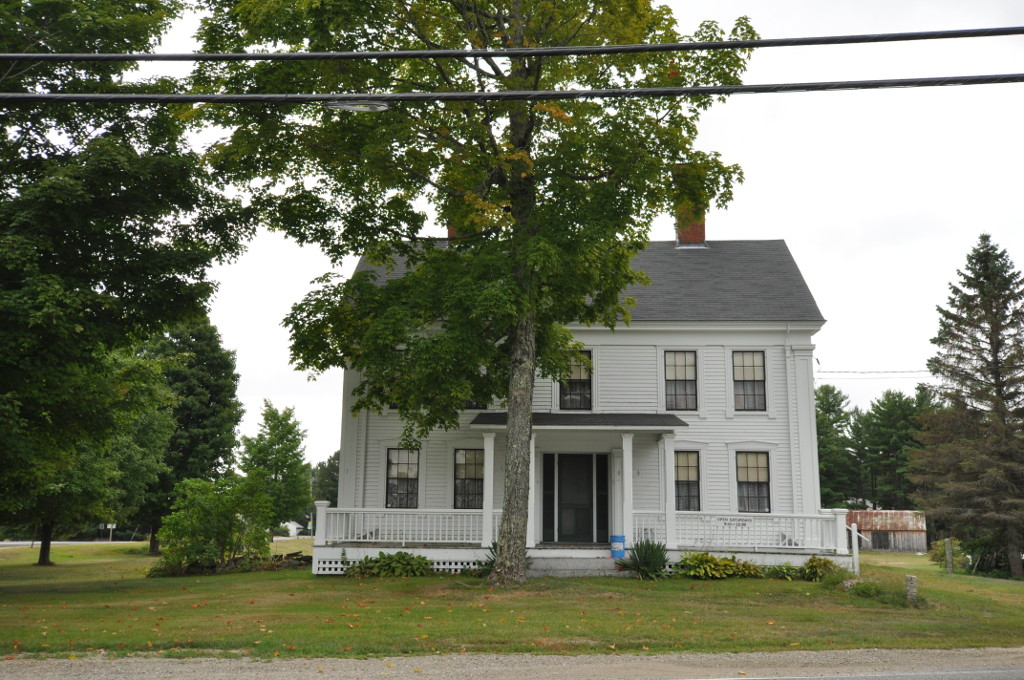

- Location within Maine Location within the United States
- Location: 6 Old Alfred Rd; Waterboro, Maine
- Coordinates: 43°35′20.4″N 70°42′32.7″W
- Area: 3 acres (1.2 ha)
- Built: 1850
- Architectural style: Greek Revival
- NRHP reference No.: 04001051
- Added to NRHP: September 22, 2004

The James Leavitt House in Waterboro Center, Maine, is a mid-19th century Greek Revival home built of wooden weatherboard and resting on a granite foundation. Built in 1850 for wealthy merchant James Leavitt, the house is on the National Register of Historic Places and is now owned by the town of Waterboro, which operates the architecturally-significant structure as a house museum known as the Taylor/Frey/Leavitt House Museum.

== History and origins ==
The builder of the Leavitt House, James Leavitt, moved to Waterboro Center with his family from nearby Alfred, Maine, between 1830 and 1840, and entered into business as "an astute businessman," as a local historian put it. The merchant had several lines of business: he bought and sold local produce in Portland and Boston, and operated a general store near his house. He also bought pre-cut fabric in Boston, which he pieced out to local women, who then assembled the fabric into men's suits, shirts and trousers, which Leavitt sold back to clothiers in Boston, often at a healthy mark-up. The women were given credits at Leavitt's store in return: the merchant's extensive records for these transactions are today maintained at the Leavitt House.

Leavitt's various businesses enabled him to make a fortune, and have an elaborate home built to suit his success as merchant. The James Leavitt House, completed in 1850, is significant for the level of interior detailing. The two-story Greek Revival home, which housed Leavitt, his wife and 12 children, boasts elaborate interior molding, carved corner blocks, a detail rarely seen on rural Maine homes. The house retains its original elaborate wallpaper, and also features "some of the finest wood-graining in the state."

"The sheer amount of surface that was grained indicates that this was probably not the work of an itinerant artist passing through town, but undertaken [by] a specialist like Jason Hamilton, a 'fancy painter' who lived in nearby Sanford and was listed in the Mercantile Union Business Directory in 1849," notes the application for the House's nomination to the National Historic Places Register. "Interestingly, the grain painting at the Leavitt house does not necessarily try to mimic natural wood, rather the combinations of patterns, such as birds-eye maple and tiger-maple, used together on the doors suggest a much more artistic approach to the application. This suggestion is further supported by the grained pictures of the rooster and the swan that appear on the back doors of two cabinets."

== Ownership succession ==
The Leavitt House, built at what was once the most prosperous location in Waterboro Center, is a large home with seven bedrooms on its second floor. After the death of merchant James Leavitt in about 1880, the home became a second residence for the family. James Leavitt's son Benjamin embarked on a career as a prosperous merchant in Saco, Maine, and used his father's home as a summer residence. After Benjamin Leavitt's death, his daughter Louella Frey inherited the home; subsequently it passed to her two daughters, including writer Helen Taylor who set her book A Time to Recall in the family home. Mrs. Taylor's three sons sold the building to the town of Waterboro in 1989.

Merchant James Leavitt, born in Alfred, Maine, in 1797, and married to Lovey Stevens of York, Maine, died 7 September 1876, at Waterboro Center. His wife died in 1825. They are both buried at Waterboro Center, not far from the home they had built.

The house is now a local historical museum.

== See also ==
- National Register of Historic Places listings in York County, Maine

== Sources ==
- James Leavitt House, National Register of Historic Places Registration Form, United States Department of the Interior, National Park Service, October 1990
