= Caleb R. Ayer House =

Historic house in Maine, United States

- U.S. National Register of Historic Places
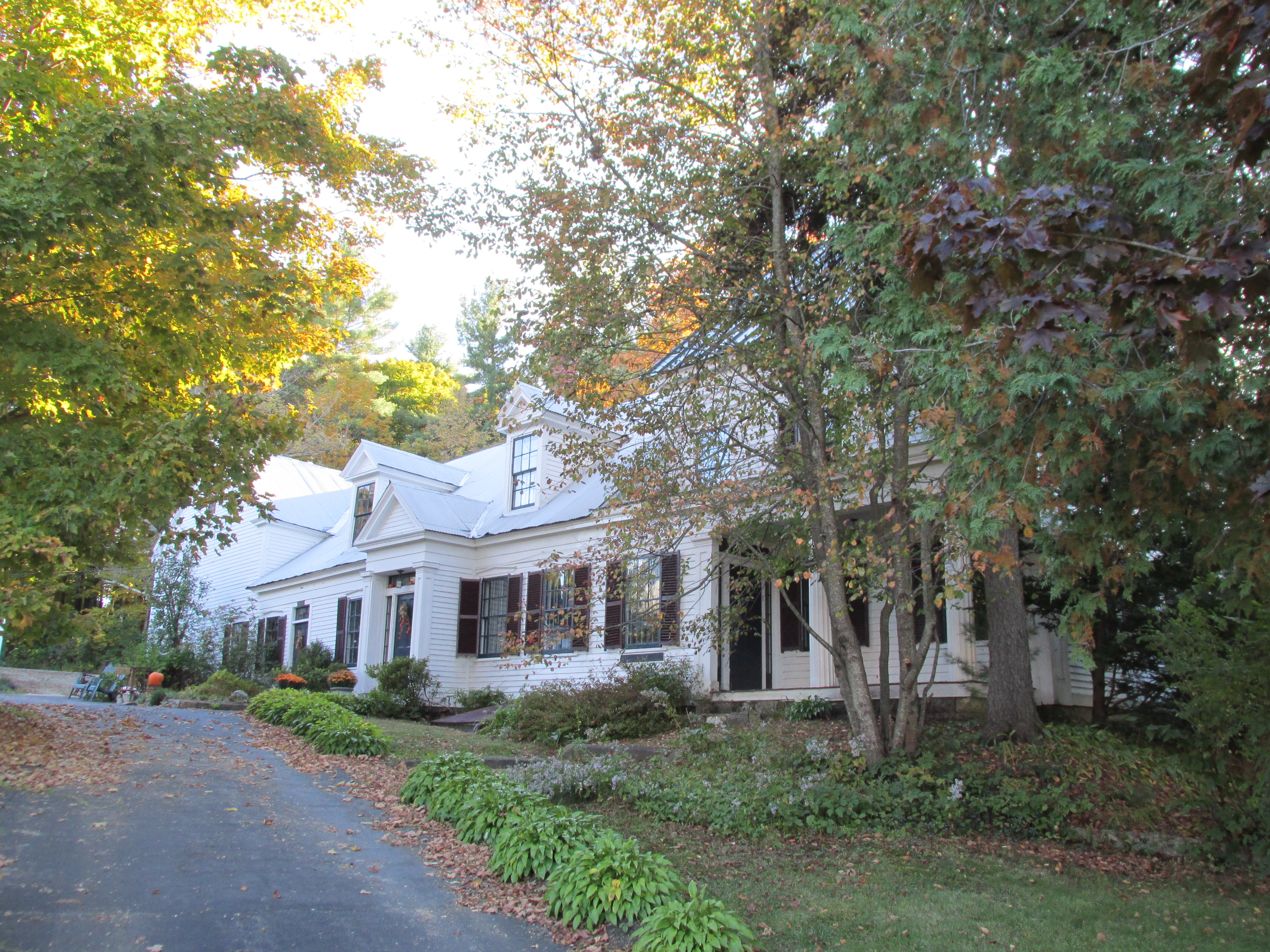

- Location within Maine Location within the United States
- Location: 7 Main Street, Cornish, Maine
- Coordinates: 43°48′16″N 70°48′15″W
- Area: 7 Main Street
- Architectural style: Greek Revival
- NRHP reference No.: 02001270
- Added to NRHP: 1988

The Caleb R. Ayer House (also known as the Ayer-Swasey House) is an historic house at 7 Main Street in Cornish, Maine, United States. The house is architecturally distinctive, with a high-style Greek Revival main block, built c. 1855, attached to an older (c. 1830) heavily altered Cape, which connects it to a period barn. The house is also historically significant as the home of Caleb Ayer, a Maine politician who served in the Maine Senate from 1847 to 1848 and as Secretary of State of Maine in 1856. It was listed on the National Register of Historic Places on September 12, 2002.

== Description and history ==
The house is set on the south side of Main Street (SR 5/SR 25) in the main village of Cornish, just east of its junction with Fiddle Lane. It is a long structure whose main axis is oriented north–south, and is divided into three distinct sections, all of whose main facades face east. The northernmost section is a 2-1/2 rectangular Greek Revival structure with a side-gable roof, and a single-story flat-roof porch extending across its three-bay front. Its corners have broad pilasters, with a double-width frieze encircling the block below the roof. To the south of this block is a 1 1/2-story Cape style extension, which is the oldest portion of the house. It is seven bays wide, with a pair of gable-roof dormers projecting from its main facade, and has a projecting gable-roofed vestibule providing a secondary entrance. At the southernmost end of the structure is a barn, whose gable roof is oriented perpendicular to the roofs of the other two sections. The interiors of the front and central blocks both reflect high-style Greek Revival design.

The central Cape portion of the house was probably built by Edward Boynton, sometime between his purchase of the land in the early 1830s, and its sale to Caleb Ayer in 1852. Although building records are sketchy, it is probably that Ayer built the front section soon afterward, including applying Greek Revival styling to the Cape portion. The house was sold in 1886 by Ayer's widow to her son-in-law, Dr. William Swasey. Ayer was a prominent lawyer who moved to Cornish after marrying a local woman; he served in the state senate and as the state secretary in 1856. Swasey practiced from the house for many years, using what is now a modern kitchen as his office.

== See also ==
- National Register of Historic Places listings in York County, Maine
