= Caleb Ayer =

American politician (1813–1883)

Secretary of State of Maine
- In office 1856
- Governor: Samuel Wells
- Preceded by: Alden Jackson
- Succeeded by: Alden Jackson

Member of the Maine Senate from the York County district
- In office 1847–1848

Personal details
- Born: May 22, 1813 Newfield, Maine, U.S.
- Died: October 5, 1883 (aged 70) Cornish, Maine, U.S.
- Party: Democrat

Caleb Robinson Ayer (May 22, 1813 – October 5, 1883) was an American politician from Maine.

Ayer graduated from Dartmouth College in 1834 and was admitted to the bar in 1838. He was an associate of Nathan Clifford and moved to Cornish in York County in 1841.

In 1847, Ayer was elected as a Democrat to the Maine State Senate and served as Senate President in 1848. In 1856, he served as the Secretary of State of Maine under Governor Samuel Wells. He served as the York County Attorney General from 1868 to 1870. He died in 1883.

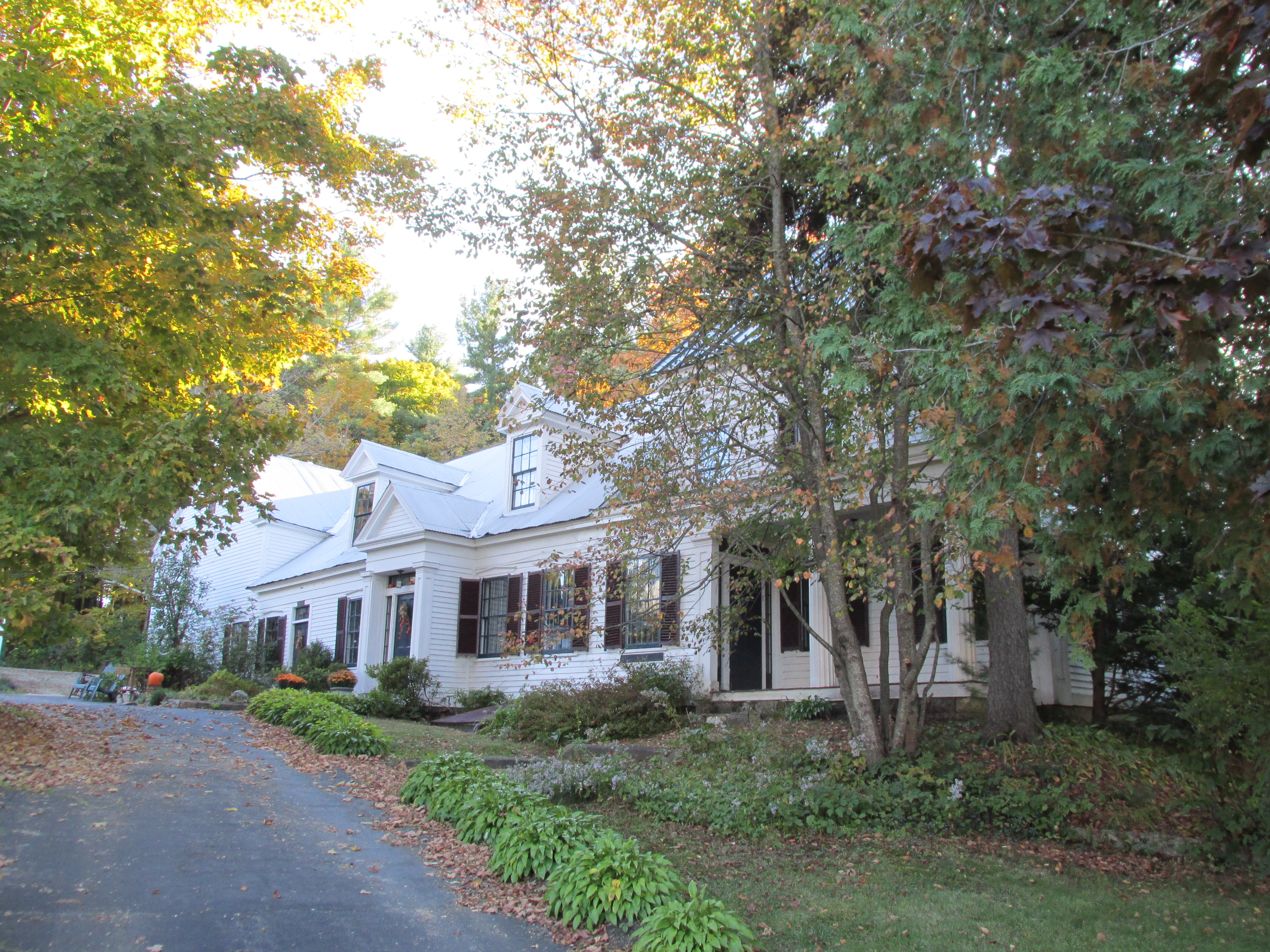

The Caleb R. Ayer House at 7 Main Street in Cornish is listed on the National Register of Historic Places.

Political offices
Preceded by Alden Jackson	Secretary of State of Maine; 1856	Succeeded by Alden Jackson
