= Lake Arrowhead, Maine =

- Census-designated place
- Location within Maine Location within the United States
- Coordinates: 43°40′19″N 70°44′48″W
- Country: United States
- State: Maine
- County: York
- Towns: Limerick; Waterboro

Area
  - Total: 6.38 sq mi (16.53 km^{2})
  - Land: 5.21 sq mi (13.50 km^{2})
  - Water: 1.17 sq mi (3.03 km^{2})
- Elevation: 338 ft (103 m)

Population (2020)
  - Total: 3,192
  - Density: 612.2/sq mi (236.38/km^{2})
- Time zone: UTC-5 (Eastern (EST))
  - Summer (DST): UTC-4 (EDT)
- ZIP Codes: 04048 (Limerick); 04061 (North Waterboro)
- Area code: 207
- FIPS code: 23-37795
- GNIS feature ID: 2377924

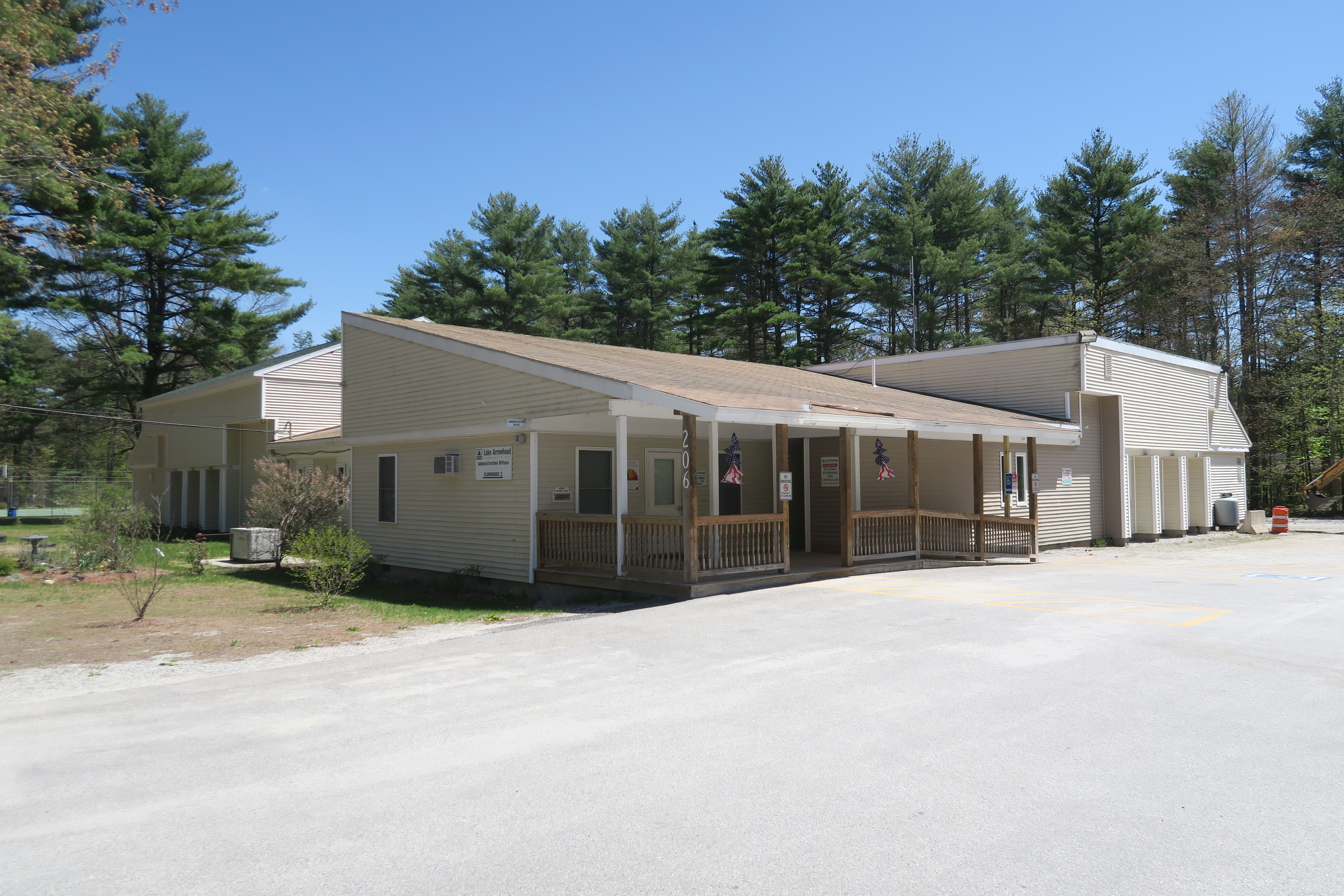
Lake Arrowhead Clubhouse, Waterboro Maine

Lake Arrowhead is a census-designated place (CDP) in the towns of Waterboro and Limerick in York County, Maine, United States. As of the 2020 census, Lake Arrowhead had a population of 3,192. The CDP corresponds to the area covered by the Lake Arrowhead Community, a large subdivision begun in the 1960s which surrounds Lake Arrowhead, an artificial lake on the Little Ossipee River. The community is part of the Portland–South Portland–Biddeford, Maine Metropolitan Statistical Area.

== Geography ==
According to the United States Census Bureau, the CDP has a total area of 6.4 square miles (17 km^{2}), of which 5.2 square miles (13 km^{2}) is land and 1.2 square miles (3.1 km^{2}), or 18.36%, is water.

=== Climate ===
This climatic region is typified by large seasonal temperature differences, with warm to hot (and often humid) summers and cold (sometimes severely cold) winters. According to the Köppen Climate Classification system, Lake Arrowhead has a humid continental climate, abbreviated "Dfb" on climate maps.

== Demographics ==
Historical population
Census	Pop.	Note	%±
2010	3,071		—
2020	3,192		3.9%
U.S. Decennial Census

=== 2020 census ===
As of the 2020 census, Lake Arrowhead had a population of 3,192. The median age was 33.9 years. 26.3% of residents were under the age of 18 and 8.6% of residents were 65 years of age or older. For every 100 females there were 96.9 males, and for every 100 females age 18 and over there were 94.0 males age 18 and over.

0.0% of residents lived in urban areas, while 100.0% lived in rural areas.

There were 1,134 households in Lake Arrowhead, of which 41.4% had children under the age of 18 living in them. Of all households, 57.3% were married-couple households, 13.5% were households with a male householder and no spouse or partner present, and 16.6% were households with a female householder and no spouse or partner present. About 13.3% of all households were made up of individuals and 3.9% had someone living alone who was 65 years of age or older.

There were 1,353 housing units, of which 16.2% were vacant. The homeowner vacancy rate was 0.7% and the rental vacancy rate was 5.1%.

Racial composition as of the 2020 census
Race	Number	Percent
White	2,990	93.7%
Black or African American	12	0.4%
American Indian and Alaska Native	9	0.3%
Asian	9	0.3%
Native Hawaiian and Other Pacific Islander	0	0.0%
Some other race	17	0.5%
Two or more races	155	4.9%
Hispanic or Latino (of any race)	61	1.9%

=== 2000 census ===
As of the census of 2000, there were 2,264 people, 746 households, and 610 families residing in the CDP. The population density was 434.1 inhabitants per square mile (167.6/km^{2}). There were 997 housing units at an average density of 191.2 per square mile (73.8/km^{2}). The racial makeup of the CDP was 98.50% White, 0.04% African American, 0.31% Native American, 0.09% Asian, 0.22% from other races, and 0.84% from two or more races. Hispanic or Latino of any race were 1.02% of the population.

There were 746 households, out of which 53.5% had children under the age of 18 living with them, 70.5% were married couples living together, 7.5% had a female householder with no husband present, and 18.1% were non-families. 9.5% of all households were made up of individuals, and 1.7% had someone living alone who was 65 years of age or older. The average household size was 3.03 and the average family size was 3.28.

In the CDP, the population was spread out, with 35.1% under the age of 18, 6.2% from 18 to 24, 42.2% from 25 to 44, 12.9% from 45 to 64, and 3.6% who were 65 years of age or older. The median age was 30 years. For every 100 females, there were 102.1 males. For every 100 females age 18 and over, there were 97.1 males.

The median income for a household in the CDP was $46,818, and the median income for a family was $46,509. Males had a median income of $39,205 versus $24,083 for females. The per capita income for the CDP was $16,588. About 4.9% of families and 6.7% of the population were below the poverty line, including 10.5% of those under age 18 and none of those age 65 or over.

== 2012 earthquake ==
On October 16, 2012, at approximately 7:12 PM EDT, an earthquake with a moment magnitude of 4.0 was felt with a maximum Mercalli intensity of VI (Strong). The earthquake was felt in many parts of eastern New England, and as far south as Long Island, NY.
