= Little Ossipee River =

Coordinates: 43.72897°N 70.65895°W

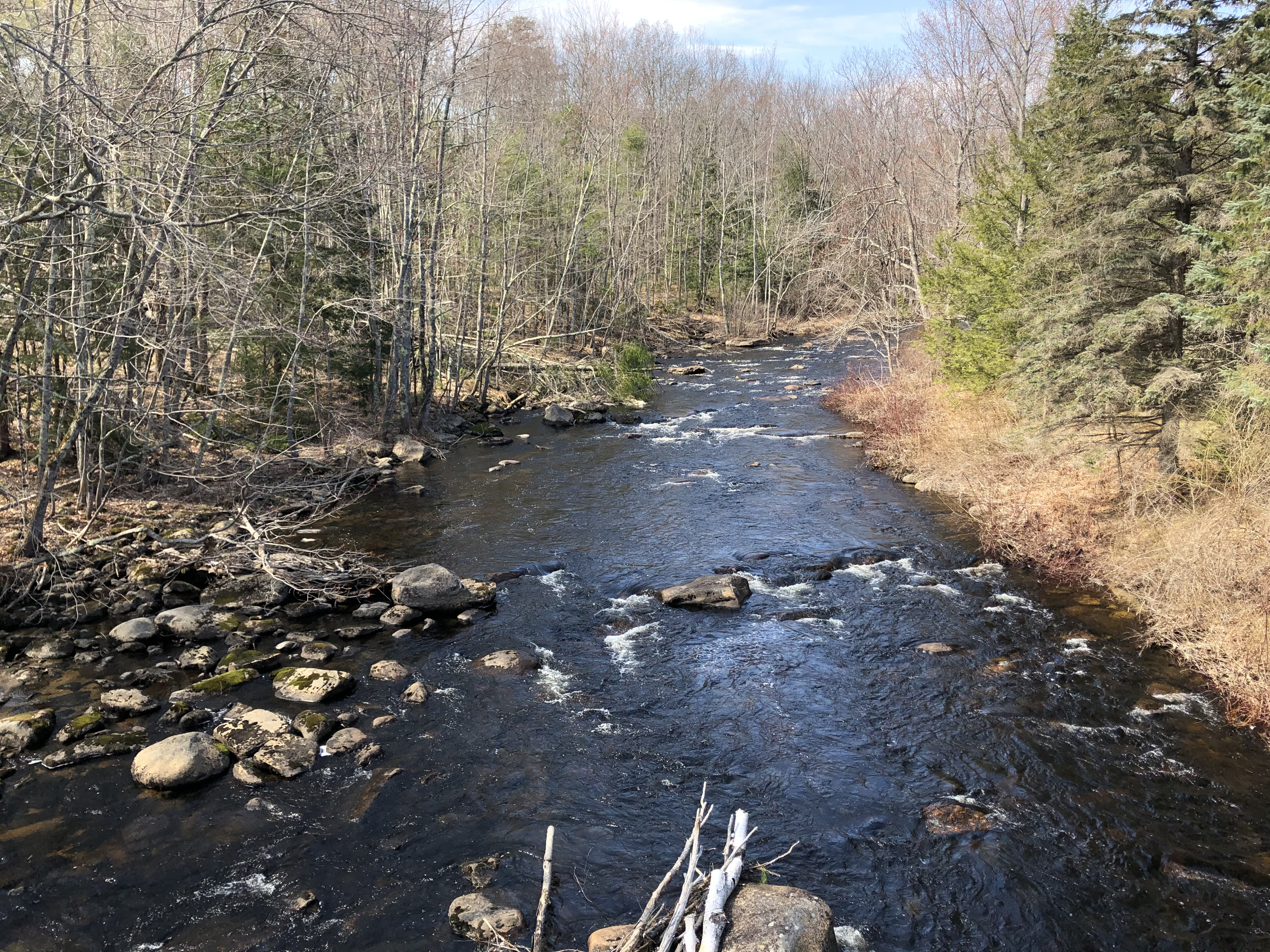
- The Little Ossipee at Bridge Street, Newfield, ME

Location
- Country: United States

Physical characteristics
- Source
  - location: Maine

The Little Ossipee River is a 33.7-mile-long (54.2 km) tributary of the Saco River in southwestern Maine, USA.

It rises at the outlet of Balch Pond in the town of Newfield and flows east, passing through Shapleigh Pond and flowing past the village of North Shapleigh. Forming the boundary between Newfield and the town of Shapleigh, the river flows northeast, then reenters Newfield, passing the town center. Turning east, the river becomes the boundary between the towns of Limerick (to the north) and Waterboro (to the south). It passes through Lake Arrowhead, a reservoir with a surrounding lakeside community, then continues northeast and north into the town of Limington, where it joins the Saco near the village of East Limington.

== See also ==
- List of rivers of Maine

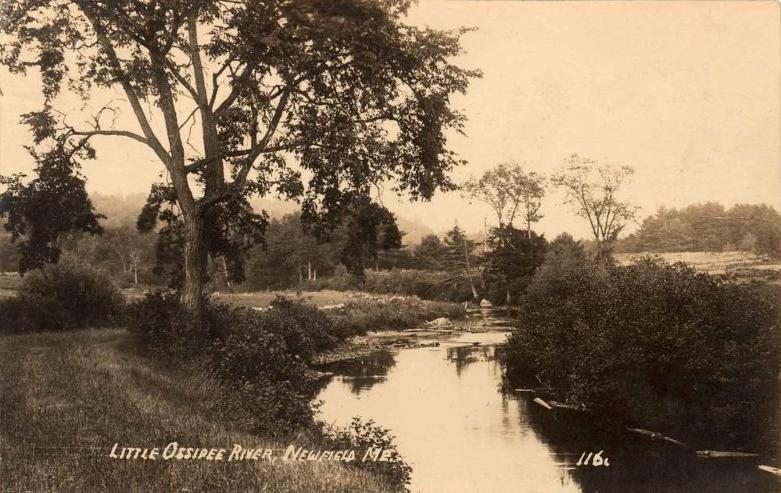
Photo c.1915
