= Limington, Maine =

Town in Maine, United States

- Town
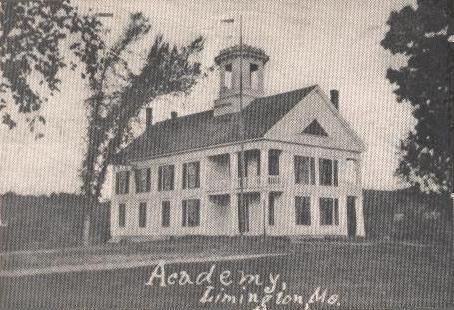
- Limington Academy, c. 1904

- Location within the state of Maine
- Coordinates: 43°44′32″N 70°43′09″W
- Country: United States
- State: Maine
- County: York
- Incorporated: 1792

Area
  - Total: 43.29 sq mi (112.12 km^{2})
  - Land: 41.92 sq mi (108.57 km^{2})
  - Water: 1.37 sq mi (3.55 km^{2})
- Elevation: 397 ft (121 m)

Population (2020)
  - Total: 3,892
  - Density: 93/sq mi (35.8/km^{2})
- Time zone: UTC-5 (Eastern (EST))
  - Summer (DST): UTC-4 (EDT)
- ZIP code: 04049
- Area code: 207
- FIPS code: 23-39405
- GNIS feature ID: 582558
- Website: limingtonmaine.gov

Limington is a town in York County, Maine, United States. The population was 3,892 at the 2020 census. Limington is a tourist destination with historic architecture. It is part of the Portland-South Portland-Biddeford metropolitan area.

== History ==
In 1668, Francis Small traded goods with the Newichewannock tribe of this area. Their Chief Wesumbe, also known as Captain Sunday, was friendly with Small and warned him of a plot against his life. A group of renegade tribesmen planned to murder Small rather than pay him the furs they owed him. Small escaped after watching his trading post in what is now Cornish burn to the ground. The chief made up for the loss by selling Small all the lands bounded by the Great and Little Ossipee Rivers, the Saco River and the New Hampshire border. Known as the Ossipee Tract, it comprised the present-day towns of Limington, Limerick, Cornish (formerly Francisborough), Newfield, Parsonsfield and Shapleigh (which then included Acton).

First called Little Ossipee Plantation (after Ossapee, its original Abenaki name), it was settled by Deacon Amos Chase, who removed here and built a mill in 1773 at the mouth of the Little Ossipee River. Ezra Davis and Jonathan Boothby followed him in 1774, and John McArthur and Joshua Small in 1775. Little Ossipee Plantation was incorporated on February 9, 1792, as the town of Limington. It was named after Limington in Somerset, England, the home county of Sir Ferdinando Gorges, Lord Proprietor of Maine. As the surface of the land was rocky and broken, in 1798 nearly 2,000 acres (8.1 km^{2}) of land were annexed from Little Falls Plantation (Hollis). In 1870, about 1,500 acres (6.1 km^{2}) of land were ceded to Limerick.

Soil was fertile and farmers yielded good crops. Another important early trade was logging, with the timber manufactured at various water power mills into lumber, boxes, shingles and clapboards. There were also gristmills and a tannery. Limington Academy was incorporated in 1848, its structure built in 1852. The population in 1870 was 1,630. Davis Memorial Library was built in 1912 to designs of noted Portland architect John Calvin Stevens. Today, 22 buildings in the town center are listed on the National Register of Historic Places.

== Geography ==
According to the United States Census Bureau, the town has a total area of 43.29 square miles (112.12 km^{2}), of which 41.92 square miles (108.57 km^{2}) is land and 1.37 square miles (3.55 km^{2}) is water. Limington is drained by the Little Ossipee River and Saco River. There are seven ponds, with four of these—Boyd, Dole, Foss and Sand ponds—in South Limington, and three others—Horn, Ward and Webster ponds—in North Limington. The highest point in town is Sawyer Mountain, at an elevation of 1,198 feet (370 m) above sea level.

Limington is served by state routes 11, 25 and 117. It borders the towns of Baldwin to the north, Standish to the east, Hollis and Waterboro to the south, and Limerick and Cornish to the west. Located in the extreme northeastern part of York County, Limington is slightly over nine miles (14 km) long and an average of five miles (8.0 km) wide.

== Demographics ==
Historical population
Census	Pop.	Note	%±
1800	1,323		—
1810	1,774		34.1%
1820	2,122		19.6%
1830	2,317		9.2%
1840	2,210		−4.6%
1850	2,116		−4.3%
1860	2,004		−5.3%
1870	1,630		−18.7%
1880	1,431		−12.2%
1890	1,092		−23.7%
1900	1,001		−8.3%
1910	980		−2.1%
1920	803		−18.1%
1930	747		−7.0%
1940	864		15.7%
1950	851		−1.5%
1960	839		−1.4%
1970	1,066		27.1%
1980	2,203		106.7%
1990	2,796		26.9%
2000	3,403		21.7%
2010	3,713		9.1%
2020	3,892		4.8%
U.S. Decennial Census

=== 2010 census ===
As of the census of 2010, there were 3,713 people, 1,392 households, and 1,029 families living in the town. The population density was 88.6 inhabitants per square mile (34.2/km^{2}). There were 1,615 housing units at an average density of 38.5 per square mile (14.9/km^{2}). The racial makeup of the town was 96.6% White, 0.2% African American, 0.4% Native American, 0.5% Asian, 0.1% Pacific Islander, 0.3% from other races, and 1.8% from two or more races. Hispanic or Latino of any race were 1.2% of the population.

There were 1,392 households, of which 34.9% had children under the age of 18 living with them, 57.4% were married couples living together, 9.9% had a female householder with no husband present, 6.6% had a male householder with no wife present, and 26.1% were non-families. 18.7% of all households were made up of individuals, and 5.7% had someone living alone who was 65 years of age or older. The average household size was 2.67 and the average family size was 3.04.

The median age in the town was 38.9 years. 24.2% of residents were under the age of 18; 7.1% were between the ages of 18 and 24; 28.1% were from 25 to 44; 31.6% were from 45 to 64; and 9.1% were 65 years of age or older. The gender makeup of the town was 50.0% male and 50.0% female.

=== 2000 census ===
As of the census of 2000, there were 3,403 people, 1,141 households, and 893 families living in the town. The population density was 81.1 inhabitants per square mile (31.3/km^{2}). There were 1,354 housing units at an average density of 32.2 per square mile (12.4/km^{2}). The racial makeup of the town was 98.33% White, 0.41% African American, 0.47% Native American, 0.18% Asian, 0.06% Pacific Islander, 0.12% from other races, and 0.44% from two or more races. Hispanic or Latino of any race were 0.29% of the population.

There were 1,141 households, out of which 41.3% had children under the age of 18 living with them, 64.1% were married couples living together, 9.4% had a female householder with no husband present, and 21.7% were non-families. 15.1% of all households were made up of individuals, and 4.7% had someone living alone who was 65 years of age or older. The average household size was 2.84 and the average family size was 3.15.

In the town, the population was spread out, with 27.4% under the age of 18, 8.2% from 18 to 24, 30.1% from 25 to 44, 23.3% from 45 to 64, and 11.0% who were 65 years of age or older. The median age was 37 years. For every 100 females, there were 96.9 males. For every 100 females age 18 and over, there were 94.4 males.

The median income for a household in the town was $42,023, and the median income for a family was $46,571. Males had a median income of $31,049 versus $23,966 for females. The per capita income for the town was $17,097. About 9.5% of families and 12.9% of the population were below the poverty line, including 17.0% of those under age 18 and 5.9% of those age 65 or over.

== Economy ==
Brackett's Orchards is thought to be the oldest family owned and operated orchard in Maine. The original descendants settled Limington, Maine in 1783, and as soon as the land was cleared, apple trees were planted on a few acres. Manley Brackett is the eighth generation of Brackets which still farms the land growing apples and many varieties of pumpkins and squash.

== Notable people ==
- Frank S. Black, US congressman; 32nd governor of New York
- Simon Lord, Wisconsin State Senator
- William B. Small, US congressman
