= Newfield, Maine =

Town in Maine, United States

- Town
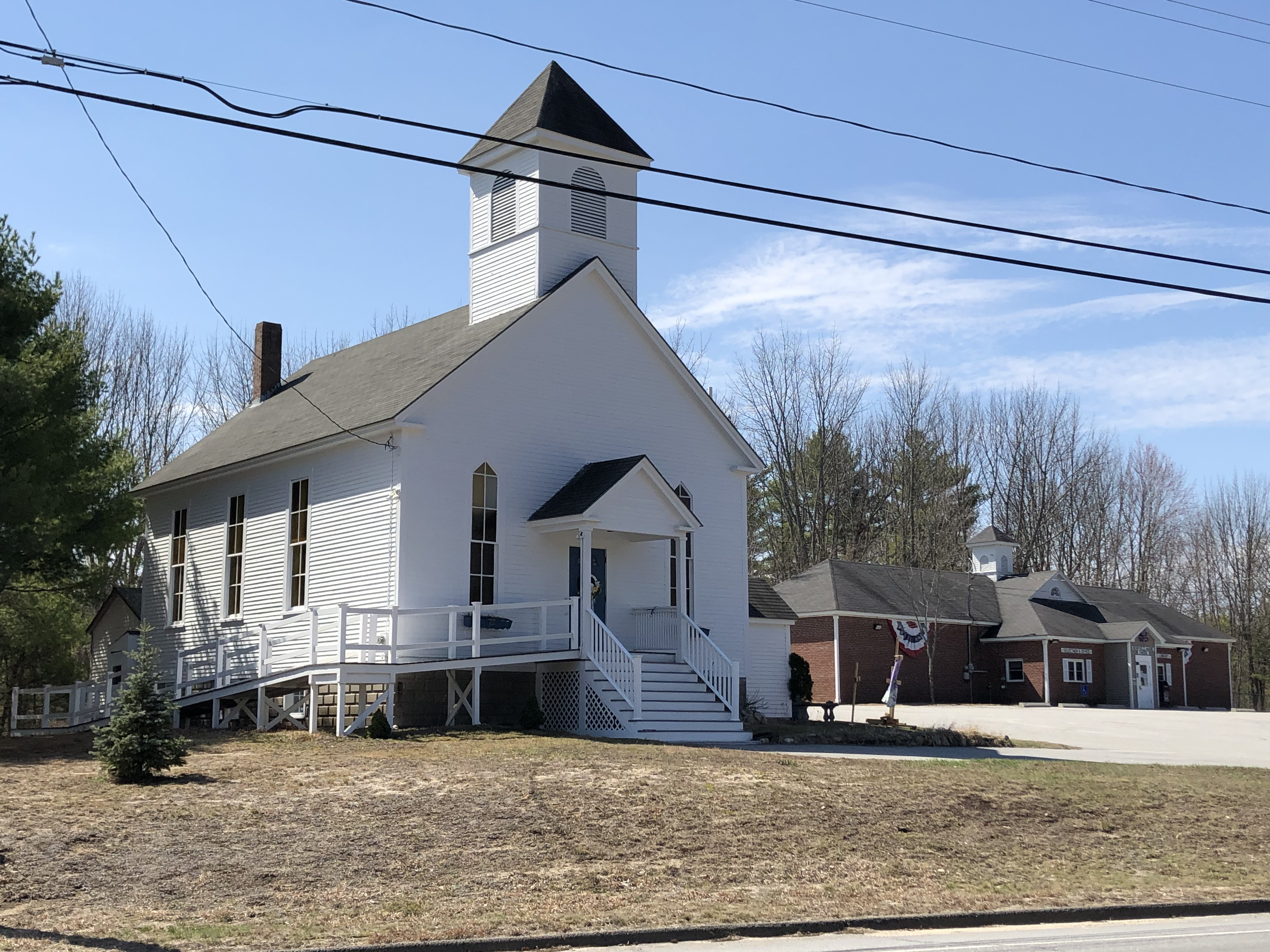
- Community church and town hall (2021)

- Location within Maine Location within the United States
- Coordinates: 43°38′13″N 70°53′44″W
- Country: United States
- State: Maine
- County: York
- Incorporated: 1794

Area
  - Total: 33.44 sq mi (86.61 km^{2})
  - Land: 32.30 sq mi (83.66 km^{2})
  - Water: 1.14 sq mi (2.95 km^{2})
- Elevation: 466 ft (142 m)

Population (2020)
  - Total: 1,648
  - Density: 51/sq mi (19.7/km^{2})
- Time zone: UTC-5 (Eastern (EST))
  - Summer (DST): UTC-4 (EDT)
- ZIP code: 04056 (Newfield); 04095 (West Newfield)
- Area code: 207
- FIPS code: 23-48750
- GNIS feature ID: 582618
- Website: newfieldme.org

Newfield is a town in York County, Maine, United States. The population was 1,648 at the 2020 census. The town is part of the Portland-South Portland-Biddeford metropolitan area.

Newfield was home to a museum called Willowbrook Museum Village.

== History ==
This was part of the large tract sold on November 28, 1668, by Newichawannock Chief Sunday (or Wesumbe) to Francis Small, a Kittery trader. The price was two large Indian blankets, two gallons of rum, two pounds of gunpowder, four pounds of musket balls and twenty strings of beads. The township was surveyed and first settled as Washington Plantation in 1778. A number of settlers had been soldiers in the Revolutionary War. It was incorporated as Newfield on February 25, 1794, and by 1859, the population was 1,418.

The Little Ossipee River runs through Newfield village and once provided water power to operate two gristmills, two lumber mills, a barrel stave mill, a shook mill, a planing mill and a carding mill. West Newfield had a sawmill, gristmill and stave mill. There was an attempt in the community to mine silver and iron, but it was not profitable. By 1880, the population was 995. Newfield would be heavily damaged by the Great Fires of 1947.

Don King of Topsfield, Massachusetts bought an old farm at Newfield in 1965, marking the beginning of what would become Willowbrook Museum Village, a re-created 19th-century village. Other properties and historic buildings were added, together with a collection of early farm implements, tools, carriages and sleighs. The museum is now a tourist attraction.

On March 17, 2009, Newfield adopted a local law to stop Nestlé and other corporations from taking over their groundwater. The volunteer community organization, Protecting Our Water and Wildlife Resources (POWWR), with the assistance of Community Environmental Legal Defense Fund (CELDF) who drafted the ordinance, were responsible for advocating the legislation.

== Geography ==
According to the United States Census Bureau, the town has a total area of 33.44 square miles (86.61 km^{2}), of which 32.30 square miles (83.66 km^{2}) is land and 1.14 square miles (2.95 km^{2}) is water. Newfield is drained by the Little Ossipee River. The town's highest point is Province Mountain, at 1,176 feet (358.4 m) above sea level.

The town is crossed by state routes 11 and 110. Newfield borders the towns of Parsonsfield to its north, Limerick and Waterboro to its east, Wakefield, New Hampshire to its west, and Acton and Shapleigh to its south.

== Demographics ==
Historical population
Census	Pop.	Note	%±
1800	556		—
1810	815		46.6%
1820	1,147		40.7%
1830	1,286		12.1%
1840	1,354		5.3%
1850	1,418		4.7%
1860	1,349		−4.9%
1870	1,193		−11.6%
1880	995		−16.6%
1890	796		−20.0%
1900	676		−15.1%
1910	620		−8.3%
1920	531		−14.4%
1930	456		−14.1%
1940	475		4.2%
1950	355		−25.3%
1960	319		−10.1%
1970	458		43.6%
1980	644		40.6%
1990	1,042		61.8%
2000	1,328		27.4%
2010	1,522		14.6%
2020	1,648		8.3%
U.S. Decennial Census

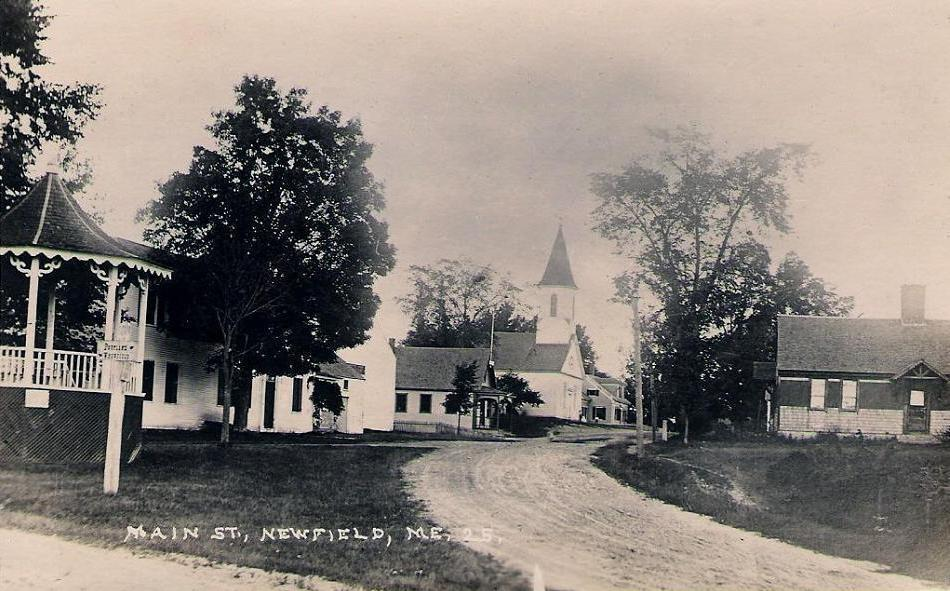
Town center in 1915

=== 2010 census ===
As of the census of 2010, there were 1,522 people, 625 households, and 450 families living in the town. The population density was 47.1 inhabitants per square mile (18.2/km^{2}). There were 1,096 housing units at an average density of 33.9 per square mile (13.1/km^{2}). The racial makeup of the town was 98.2% White, 0.1% African American, 0.7% Native American, 0.1% Asian, 0.1% from other races, and 0.9% from two or more races. Hispanic or Latino of any race were 0.8% of the population.

There were 625 households, of which 31.0% had children under the age of 18 living with them, 58.1% were married couples living together, 9.0% had a female householder with no husband present, 5.0% had a male householder with no wife present, and 28.0% were non-families. 22.1% of all households were made up of individuals, and 7.4% had someone living alone who was 65 years of age or older. The average household size was 2.44 and the average family size was 2.81.

The median age in the town was 44.3 years. 21% of residents were under the age of 18; 6.8% were between the ages of 18 and 24; 23.6% were from 25 to 44; 35.2% were from 45 to 64; and 13.5% were 65 years of age or older. The gender makeup of the town was 50.8% male and 49.2% female.

=== 2000 census ===
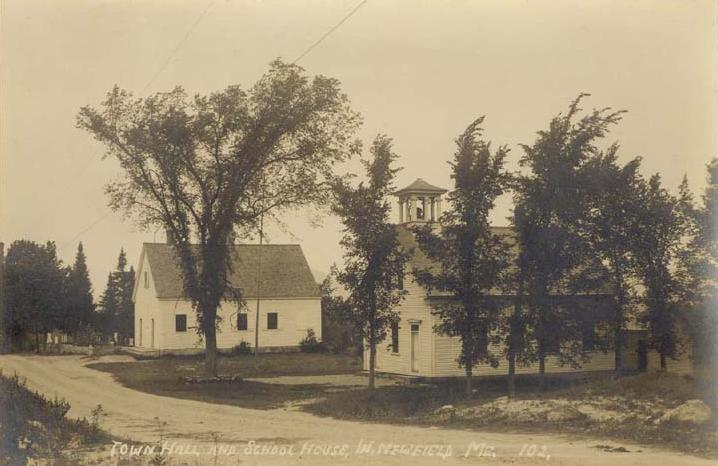
Town hall and schoolhouse c. 1915

As of the census of 2000, there were 1,328 people, 496 households, and 370 families living in the town. The population density was 41.1 inhabitants per square mile (15.9/km^{2}). There were 939 housing units at an average density of 29.1 per square mile (11.2/km^{2}). The racial makeup of the town was 97.89% White, 0.08% African American, 0.90% Native American, 0.08% Asian, 0.15% from other races, and 0.90% from two or more races. Hispanic or Latino of any race were 0.68% of the population.

There were 496 households, out of which 35.5% had children under the age of 18 living with them, 63.7% were married couples living together, 6.9% had a female householder with no husband present, and 25.4% were non-families. 19.2% of all households were made up of individuals, and 6.9% had someone living alone who was 65 years of age or older. The average household size was 2.67 and the average family size was 3.02.

In the town, the population was spread out, with 26.4% under the age of 18, 6.3% from 18 to 24, 29.0% from 25 to 44, 27.1% from 45 to 64, and 11.3% who were 65 years of age or older. The median age was 39 years. For every 100 females, there were 106.5 males. For every 100 females age 18 and over, there were 105.5 males.

The median income for a household in the town was $38,654, and the median income for a family was $41,563. Males had a median income of $30,403 versus $24,688 for females. The per capita income for the town was $16,280. About 8.0% of families and 10.4% of the population were below the poverty line, including 10.0% of those under age 18 and 11.8% of those age 65 or over.

== Education ==
Students of Newfield who are in grades K–5 attend Line Elementary School, which is a part of Regional School Unit 57, on the Newfield-Limerick border, shared with Limerick. Students in grades 6–8 attend Massabesic Middle School, while students in grades 9–12 attend Massabesic High School in Waterboro.

== Sites of interest ==
- Newfield Historical Society & Museum
- Willowbrook Museum Village

== Notable people ==
- Nathan Clifford, statesman, diplomat and jurist
- Horace Parnell Tuttle, astronomer
