= Limerick, Maine =

- Town
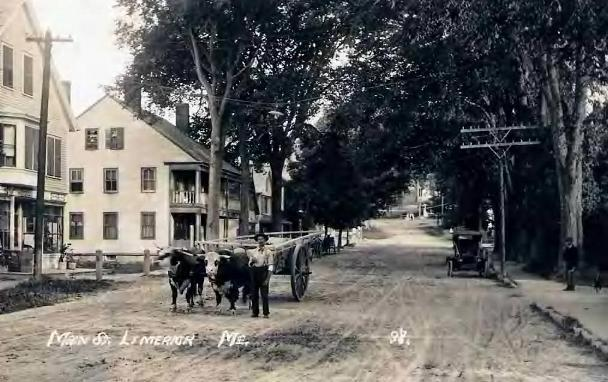
- Main Street (Sokokis Trail)

- Seal

- Location within the state of Maine
- Coordinates: 43°41′19″N 70°46′05″W
- Country: United States
- State: Maine
- County: York
- Settled: 1775
- Incorporated: March 6, 1787

Area
  - Total: 28.25 sq mi (73.17 km^{2})
  - Land: 27.14 sq mi (70.29 km^{2})
  - Water: 1.11 sq mi (2.87 km^{2})
- Elevation: 551 ft (168 m)

Population (2020)
  - Total: 3,188
  - Density: 118/sq mi (45.4/km^{2})
- Time zone: UTC-5 (Eastern (EST))
  - Summer (DST): UTC-4 (EDT)
- ZIP code: 04048
- Area code: 207
- FIPS code: 23-39195
- GNIS feature ID: 582556
- Website: limerickme.org

Limerick (pronounced "LIM-rick") is a town in York County, Maine, United States. It is part of the Portland-South Portland-Biddeford metropolitan area. The population was 3,188 at the 2020 census. Limerick contains part of the census-designated place of Lake Arrowhead.

== History ==
This was territory of the Newichewannock Abenaki people, whose village was located on the Salmon Falls River. In 1668, Francis Small of Kittery, a trader, bought from Chief Captain Sunday (or Wesumbe) a large tract of land, for which he exchanged two blankets, two gallons of rum, two pounds of gunpowder, four pounds of musket balls and twenty strings of beads. Small thereupon sold half of his interest to Major Nicholas Shapleigh of Eliot, one of the wealthiest merchants in the Piscataqua region.

Settlement was delayed, however, by the ongoing French and Indian Wars, which finally ended with the 1763 Treaty of Paris. In 1773, the heirs of Francis Small and Nicholas Shapleigh promised a township to lawyer James Sullivan of Biddeford if he defended their larger claims. Sullivan accepted and in 1775 helped settle Limerick Plantation, named after Limerick in Ireland, his father's birthplace. It would be incorporated on March 6, 1787. Among the early settlers was Dr. Joshua Leavitt, for whom Leavitt Brook in Limerick is named. The town of New Limerick in Aroostook County would be settled by people from Limerick, Maine.

The village grew along the old Sokokis Trail (now Route 5), which connected the Sokokis village at Pequawket (now Fryeburg) to the tribe's coastal encampment at what is today Saco. Endowed with good soil, Limerick became a thriving farming community. Chief crops included hay, apples, grapes and cranberries. Cattle and dairy products were important. In addition, the town had four blacksmith shops, four shoemakers, two hatmakers, two harness makers and three tanneries. Various brooks provided water power for industry, including four furniture factories and a clothing factory. There were also gristmills, shingle mills and lumber mills. In 1826 the Morning Star, a Free Will Baptist abolitionist newspaper, was founded in the town. In 1846, James Bradbury established the Limerick Manufacturing Company at Brown Brook. It was bought in 1857 by Joshua Holland. The firm produced the nationally famous Holland Blankets, which were supplied to troops during the Civil War. A village once called Hollandville developed around the mill.

== Geography ==
According to the United States Census Bureau, the town has a total area of 28.25 square miles (73.17 km^{2}), of which, 27.14 square miles (70.29 km^{2}) is land and 1.11 square miles (2.87 km^{2}) is water. Set among hills and lakes, Limerick is drained by Leavitt Brook, Brown Brook and Spencer Brook.

The town borders Newfield, Parsonsfield, Cornish, Waterboro and Limington. Maine State routes 5, 11, and 160 cross through Limerick.

== Demographics ==
Historical population
Census	Pop.	Note	%±
1790	409		—
1800	829		102.7%
1810	1,177		42.0%
1820	1,377		17.0%
1830	1,419		3.1%
1840	1,508		6.3%
1850	1,473		−2.3%
1860	1,441		−2.2%
1870	1,425		−1.1%
1880	1,253		−12.1%
1890	966		−22.9%
1900	874		−9.5%
1910	965		10.4%
1920	761		−21.1%
1930	1,199		57.6%
1940	1,080		−9.9%
1950	961		−11.0%
1960	907		−5.6%
1970	963		6.2%
1980	1,356		40.8%
1990	1,688		24.5%
2000	2,240		32.7%
2010	2,892		29.1%
2020	3,188		10.2%
U.S. Decennial Census

=== 2010 census ===
As of the census of 2010, there were 2,892 people, 1,100 households, and 803 families living in the town. The population density was 106.6 inhabitants per square mile (41.2/km^{2}). There were 1,569 housing units at an average density of 57.8 per square mile (22.3/km^{2}). The racial makeup of the town was 97.3% White, 0.3% African American, 0.6% Native American, 0.2% Asian, 0.1% from other races, and 1.5% from two or more races. Hispanic or Latino of any race were 1.0% of the population.

There were 1,100 households, of which 35.6% had children under the age of 18 living with them, 56.9% were married couples living together, 10.0% had a female householder with no husband present, 6.1% had a male householder with no wife present, and 27.0% were non-families. 19.5% of all households were made up of individuals, and 7.5% had someone living alone who was 65 years of age or older. The average household size was 2.62 and the average family size was 2.97.

The median age in the town was 39.4 years. 25% of residents were under the age of 18; 7% were between the ages of 18 and 24; 26.6% were from 25 to 44; 30.3% were from 45 to 64; and 11.1% were 65 years of age or older. The gender makeup of the town was 50.2% male and 49.8% female.

=== 2000 census ===
As of the census of 2000, there were 2,240 people, 850 households, and 607 families living in the town. The population density was 82.5 inhabitants per square mile (31.9/km^{2}). There were 1,279 housing units at an average density of 47.1 per square mile (18.2/km^{2}). The racial makeup of the town was 98.21% White, 0.31% African American, 0.13% Native American, 0.04% Asian, 0.04% from other races, and 1.25% from two or more races. Hispanic or Latino of any race were 0.36% of the population.

There were 850 households, out of which 34.0% had children under the age of 18 living with them, 58.7% were married couples living together, 8.7% had a female householder with no husband present, and 28.5% were non-families. 21.2% of all households were made up of individuals, and 8.4% had someone living alone who was 65 years of age or older. The average household size was 2.63 and the average family size was 3.06.

In the town, the population was spread out, with 27.6% under the age of 18, 6.9% from 18 to 24, 31.6% from 25 to 44, 22.8% from 45 to 64, and 11.2% who were 65 years of age or older. The median age was 36 years. For every 100 females, there were 100.2 males. For every 100 females age 18 and over, there were 98.3 males.

The median income for a household in the town was $40,845, and the median income for a family was $44,917. Males had a median income of $32,829 versus $24,036 for females. The per capita income for the town was $18,844. About 7.5% of families and 9.5% of the population were below the poverty line, including 12.8% of those under age 18 and 4.3% of those age 65 or over.

== Education ==
Limerick students grades K–5 attend the Line Elementary School, which is also shared by Newfield and which is based in Newfield. It is part of Regional School Unit 57. Students in grades 6–8 attend Massabesic Middle School, while students in grades 9–12 attend Massabesic High School, both of which are in Waterboro.

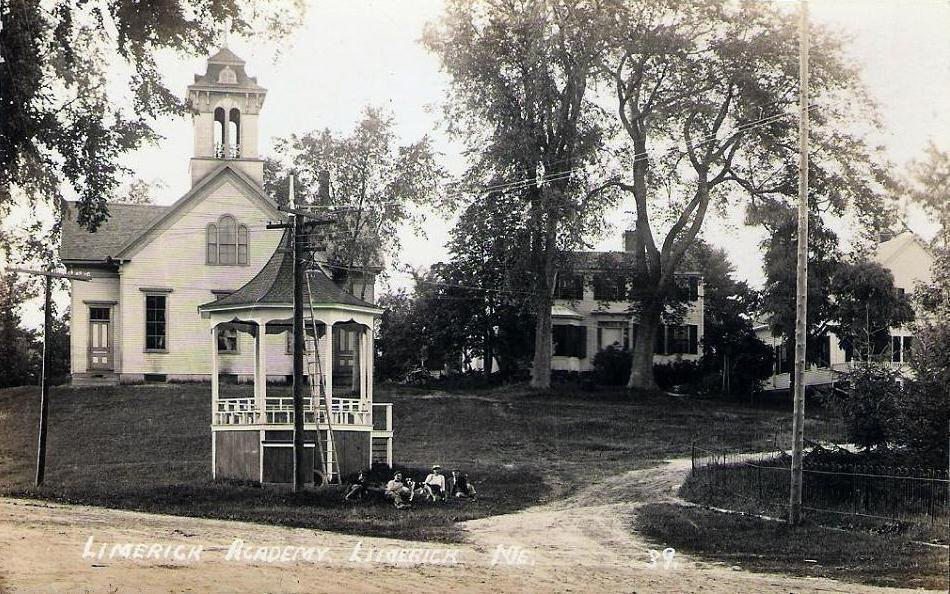
Town center c. 1915

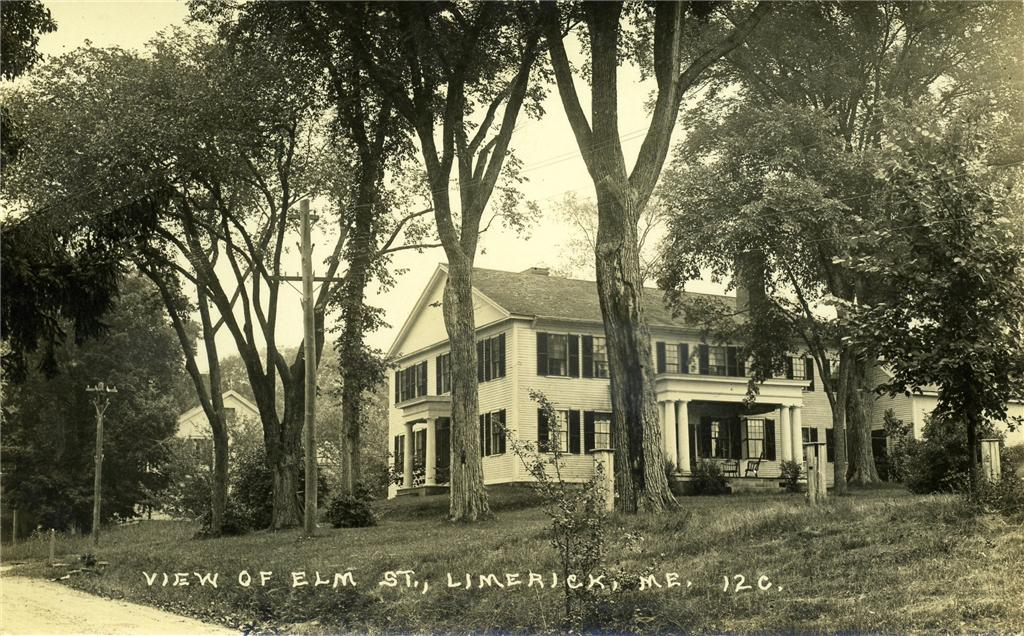
Elm Street c. 1915

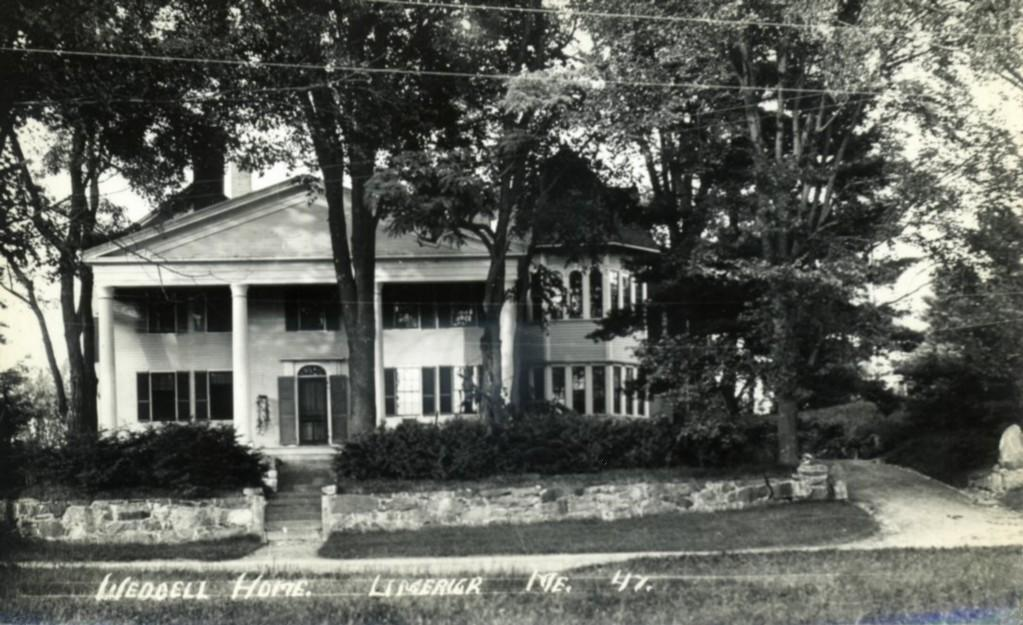
Weddell House c. 1915

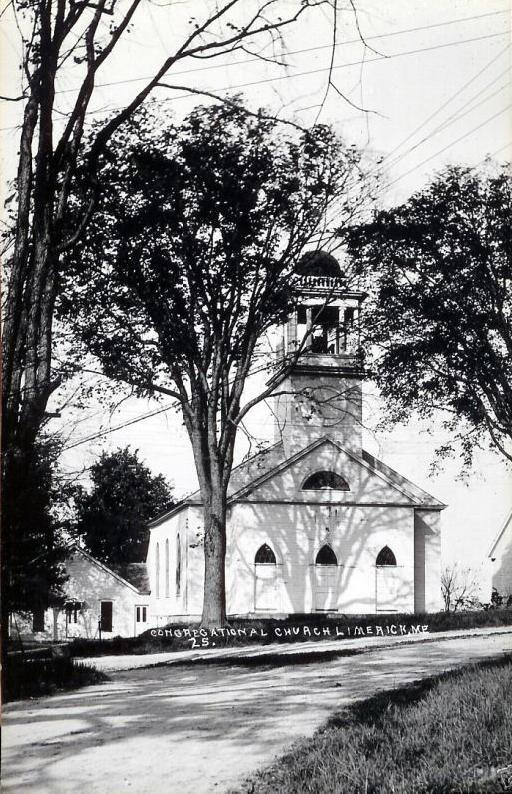
Cong. Church c. 1915

== Notable people ==
- Alpheus Felch, US Senator; fifth governor of Michigan
- Joseph M. Harper, US Representative and Acting Governor of New Hampshire
- Isaiah H. Hedge, MD, abolitionist, early donor to Bates College, physician
- Louise Lamprey, writer of children's literature
- Moses MacDonald, US Representative
- Annie Carroll Moore, children's librarian
