= Fortune's Rocks =

Fortune's Rocks may refer to:

- Fortune's Rocks (novel), a 1999 novel by Anita Shreve
- Fortunes Rocks, Maine, a seaside community in Biddeford, York County, Maine
