= GWI =

GWI may refer to:

- Garden World Images, a horticultural image library
- Genesee & Wyoming, an American railroad
- Germanwings, a German airline
- GWI (company), an audience targeting company
- Golden West Invitational, an American college track and field meet
- Gui (food), Korean grilled dishes
- Gulf War illness
- GWI.net, an English telecommunications company
- Gwi language, native to Botswana
- Gwi people
- Gwich’in language, native to Canada and the United States
