= Kermes =

Kermes may refer to:

- Kermes (insect), a genus of insects
- Kermes (dye), a red dye made from the bodies of Kermes insects
- Kermes oak also called Quercus coccifera, the tree on which the Kermes insects traditionally fed
- Alchermes, a confectionery remedy coloured red
- Kermesite, the mineral antimony oxysulfide (Sb_{2}S_{2}O), also known as red antimony
- Kermes mineral, an older term for an imprecise compound of antimony oxides and sulfides
- Simone Kermes, a German soprano best known for her work in the virtuoso Baroque and Classical repertoire
- Kermesse (festival)

== See also ==
- Alkermes (disambiguation)
- Kermesse (disambiguation)
