= Kermesse =

Kermesse (or Kermess) may refer to one of the following:

- Kermesse (cycling), a variety of cycling road race
- Kermesse (festival), a local festival, originally relating to a church
- La Kermesse Franco-Americaine Festival, A local festival celebrating French Canadian culture
- Carnival in Flanders known in French as La Kermesse héroïque, a film by Jacques Feyder
- Kermess, a rock band from Quebec, Canada
- Kermesse (1959 film) featuring Fanny Schiller
