= McArthur Public Library =

Coordinates: 43.49457°N 70.45799°W

Pavilion Congregational Church, which later became the McArthur Public Library

McArthur Public Library is a public library in Biddeford, Maine. It opened in October 1863 as a department within Biddeford City Hall, and has been in its current location since 1902. It is one of the oldest tax-supported libraries in New England, and the oldest in the state of Maine.

== History ==
McArthur Public Library first opened in 1863. It was located in a room in Biddeford City Hall, which burned down in 1894. The Mayor of Biddeford recommended that a private association maintain the facility for the benefit of its patrons. The major benefactor for this association was Robert McArthur. The congregation of the Third Congregational Church (previously known as the Pavilion Church) sold their building to McArthur for conversion into a new library. The new library opened on October 13, 1902, and contained 6,000 books. A new entrance was added to the front of the building in 1995, funded by the local Rotary Club.

== Robert McArthur ==
Born in 1838, Robert McArthur emigrated to the United States. At the age of 8, McArthur began working in the Textile Mills of New England as well as New Jersey, and worked his way to the top rank of agent of the Laconia and Pepperell Mills in the state of Maine. McArthur was a self-educated man who believed that public libraries and their services should be made available to all. In honor of this belief, McArthur purchased the Pavilion Congregational Church and set up a fund for the maintenance of the building, a tradition that his daughters continued upon their deaths.

== Library services ==
Through the support of benefactors, McArthur Public Library provides many services for the people of Biddeford. The facility offers nearly 60,000 printed books, 7,000 e-books, a large audio book collection, as well as DVDs, CDs, and magazines. The library provides free WiFi services, public access computers, and hands-on classes for both youth and adults and is connected to many of Maine's Colleges and the University of Maine. The library hosts programs for infants through teens including story time and summer reading programs. The library also hosts a showing of unique photographs of the city and its surrounding areas.
