= Dudley Block =

- U.S. National Register of Historic Places
- U.S. Historic district – Contributing property
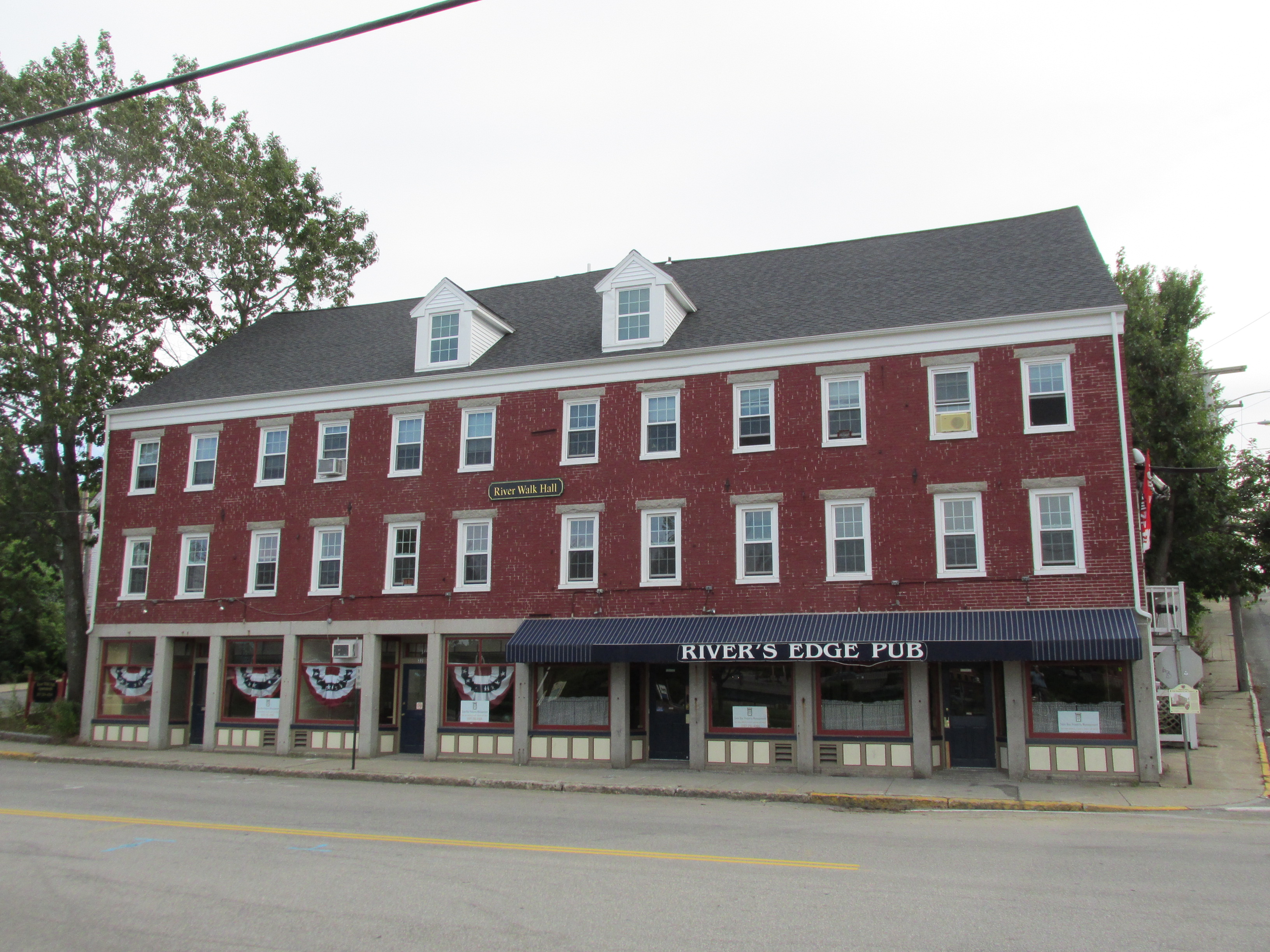
- The Dudley Block in 2013

- Location within Maine Location within the United States
- Location: 28-34 Water St., Biddeford, Maine
- Coordinates: 43°29′32″N 70°27′1″W
- Area: 0.3 acres (0.12 ha)
- Built: 1848
- Architectural style: Greek Revival
- Part of: Biddeford Main Street Historic District (ID09001146)
- NRHP reference No.: 82000428

Significant dates
- Added to NRHP: November 12, 1982
- Designated CP: December 24, 2009

The Dudley Block is a historic mixed-use commercial and residential building in at 28-34 Water Street in downtown Biddeford, Maine. Built in 1848, it is one of the older buildings in the downtown area, and is a fine example of Greek Revival commercial architecture. It was listed on the National Register of Historic Places in 1982, and was included in the Biddeford Main Street Historic District in 2009.

== Description and history ==
The Dudley Block is located on the south side of Water Street, between Pierson Lane and Sullivan Street, opposite Mechanics Park, and just south Biddeford's Main Street. It is 3-1/2 stories in height, with a ground floor of commercial storefronts, divided by granite piers. The upper two levels are brick, with rows of twelve sash windows topped by granite lintels. The roof is gabled, with two small gabled dormers. Entrance to the upper floors, which house residential units, are via doorways in the south facade.

When this block was built in 1848 by Benjamin Dudley, it stood opposite some of the city's wharves, and was built on a site that had seen earlier commercial use. Dudley's building was part of a series of speculative developments in the area to provide services and housing to people working in the mills and the waterfront. Dudley sold the building in 1864 to a partnership including his son-in-law Abel Jellison. Jellison was a prominent local figure in the second half of the 19th century, serving as a city alderman and in the state legislature.

== See also ==
- National Register of Historic Places listings in York County, Maine
