= Fletcher's Neck Lifesaving Station =

Historic lifesaving station in Maine, United States

- U.S. National Register of Historic Places
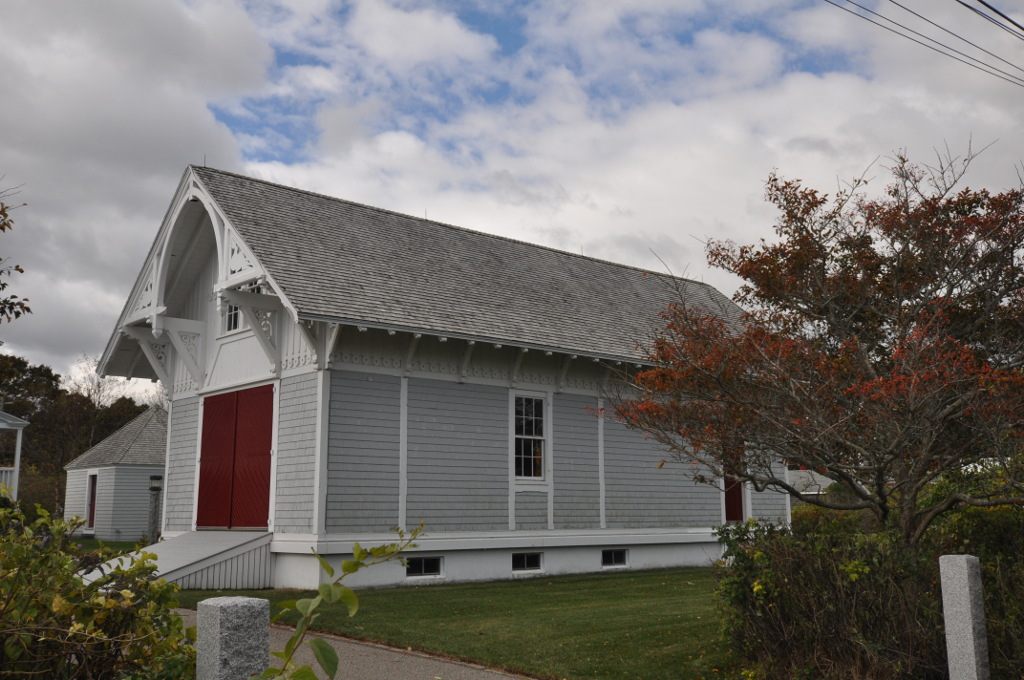
- The 1874 station

- Location within Maine Location within the United States
- Location: Ocean Ave., Biddeford Pool, Maine
- Coordinates: 43°26′33″N 70°20′33″W
- Area: 1 acre (0.40 ha)
- Built: 1874
- Built by: United States Life-Saving Service
- Architectural style: Stick/Eastlake
- NRHP reference No.: 74000195
- Added to NRHP: November 1, 1974

The Fletcher's Neck Lifesaving Station was a maritime rescue facility at Ocean Avenue and Fourth Street in the Biddeford Pool area of Biddeford, Maine. Established in 1874 by the United States Life-Saving Service, its original building is one of the best-preserved of the first five stations built by the service on the coast of Maine and New Hampshire. A larger station was built adjacent to the original in 1938. The station was in active use until 1971.

== Description and history ==
Biddeford Pool is a peninsula jutting into the Gulf of Maine just south of the mouth of the Saco River on the southern coast of Maine. The Fletcher Lifesaving Station is located on the southeast side of the peninsula, just west of the junction of Fourth Street and Ocean Avenue. The original 1874 station is a small garage-like structure with a gable roof, 1-1/2 stories in height. Its main facade faces toward the ocean, with a large two-leaf equipment door as its main feature. The gable roof has extended overhangs on all sides, with large brackets supporting the eaves, featuring a carved dolphin at their centers. The area under the eaves is finished in vertical board siding, while that below is clapboarded. The interior of the main floor was dominated by an equipment bay, with a common kitchen and lounge space behind, and quarters in the attic story for a keeper and six men. To the left of this structure is the much larger 1938 station, a Shingle-style structure two stories in height, with two equipment bays on the right, and a prominent four-story tower with observation room at the top.

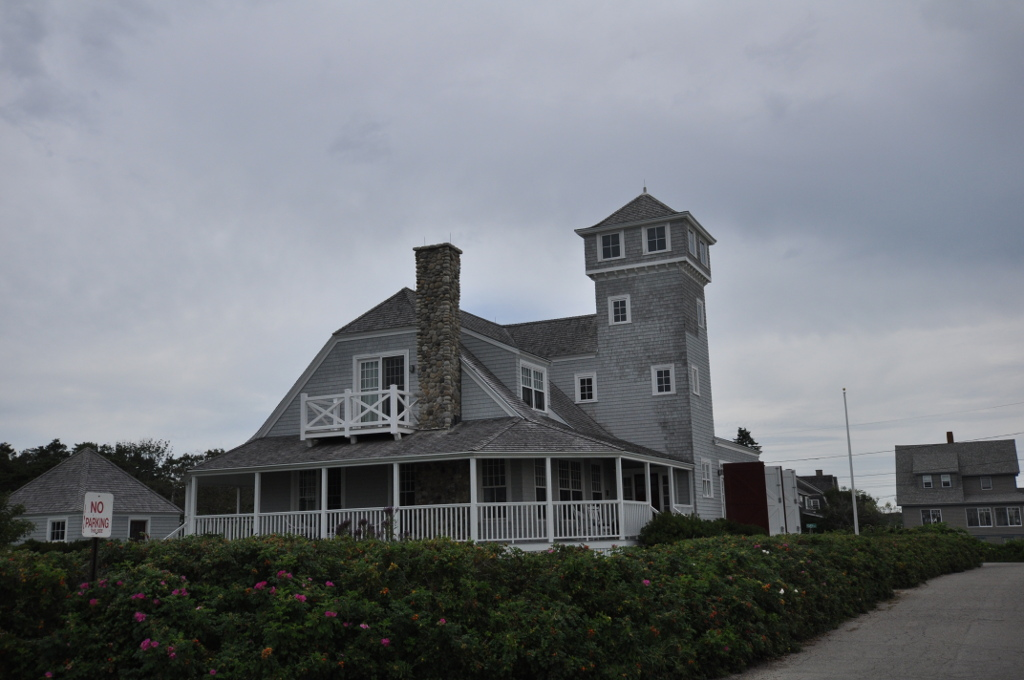
The 1938 station

The United States Life-Saving Service was established by an Act of Congress in 1874, as a means to provide rescue services along the nation's coastlines. Fletcher's was one of five such stations established along the coastlines of Maine and New Hampshire, entering service formally on December 1, 1874. The Service was later merged into the United States Coast Guard, which built the larger station in 1938. The station was described as being still active in 1945, and all Coast Guard activity was recorded as ending in 1971.

== See also ==
- National Register of Historic Places listings in York County, Maine
