= Biddeford Main Street Historic District =

Historic district in Maine, United States

- U.S. National Register of Historic Places
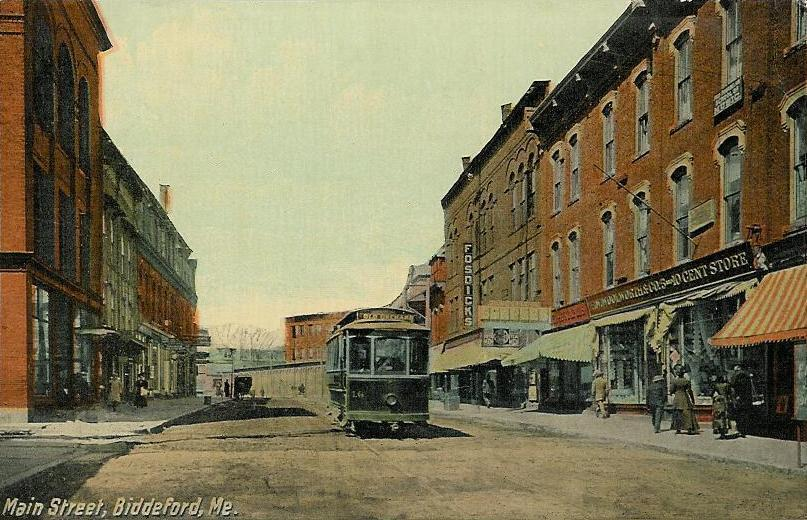
- Main Street, Biddeford from a 1908 postcard.

- Location within Maine Location within the United States
- Location: 29 to 316 Main St., and portions of Elm, Jefferson, Adams, Washington, Franklin, Alfred and Water Sts. Biddeford, Maine
- Coordinates: 43°29′36″N 70°27′19″W
- Architect: John Calvin Stevens et al.
- Architectural style: Classical Revival, Late Victorian
- NRHP reference No.: 09001146
- Added to NRHP: December 24, 2009

Biddeford Main Street Historic District is an historic district in downtown Biddeford, Maine, USA. It encompasses the heart of the city's civic and commercial business district, extending along Main and Water Streets between Pike and Elm Streets, extending for short distances along several side streets. It is noted for its collection of late 19th and early 20th century commercial brick and masonry architecture. The district was added to the National Register of Historic Places in 2009.

== Description and history ==
The city of Biddeford is located on the south bank of the Saco River on the coast of southern Maine. Its central business district is located inland, opposite that of the city of Saco, which lies to the north. The two cities developed around this area due to its ideal location for textile mills, which, on the Biddeford side, are located just between what is now Main Street and the river. This development began in a significant way in the 1840s, and the Main Street area was developed over the next century, mirroring the rise and fall of the mill industry.

Buildings in the district were built to serve the residential and economic needs of the mills and their workers. Early buildings combined these functions, providing living spaces above retail storefronts. The oldest surviving building in the district, the Thatcher Hotel, was built in 1846 as a hotel; it is a three-story Greek Revival brick building. Most of the district's buildings are between two and four floors in height, and are in a diversity of architectural styles. Stylistically notable buildings include the 1924 Egyptian Revival Paquin Building (5 Washington Street) and the 1926 Palace Diner (15 Franklin Street). The district's civic focus is on City Hall, a combination civic and performing arts space housing the City Theater. The building was designed by the Portland architect John Calvin Stevens and completed in 1896. It is individually listed on the National Register, as are the Dudley Block on Water Street and the post office building at 35 Washington.

== See also ==
- National Register of Historic Places listings in York County, Maine
