= Old Post Office (Biddeford, Maine) =

- U.S. Post Office
- U.S. National Register of Historic Places
- U.S. Historic district – Contributing property
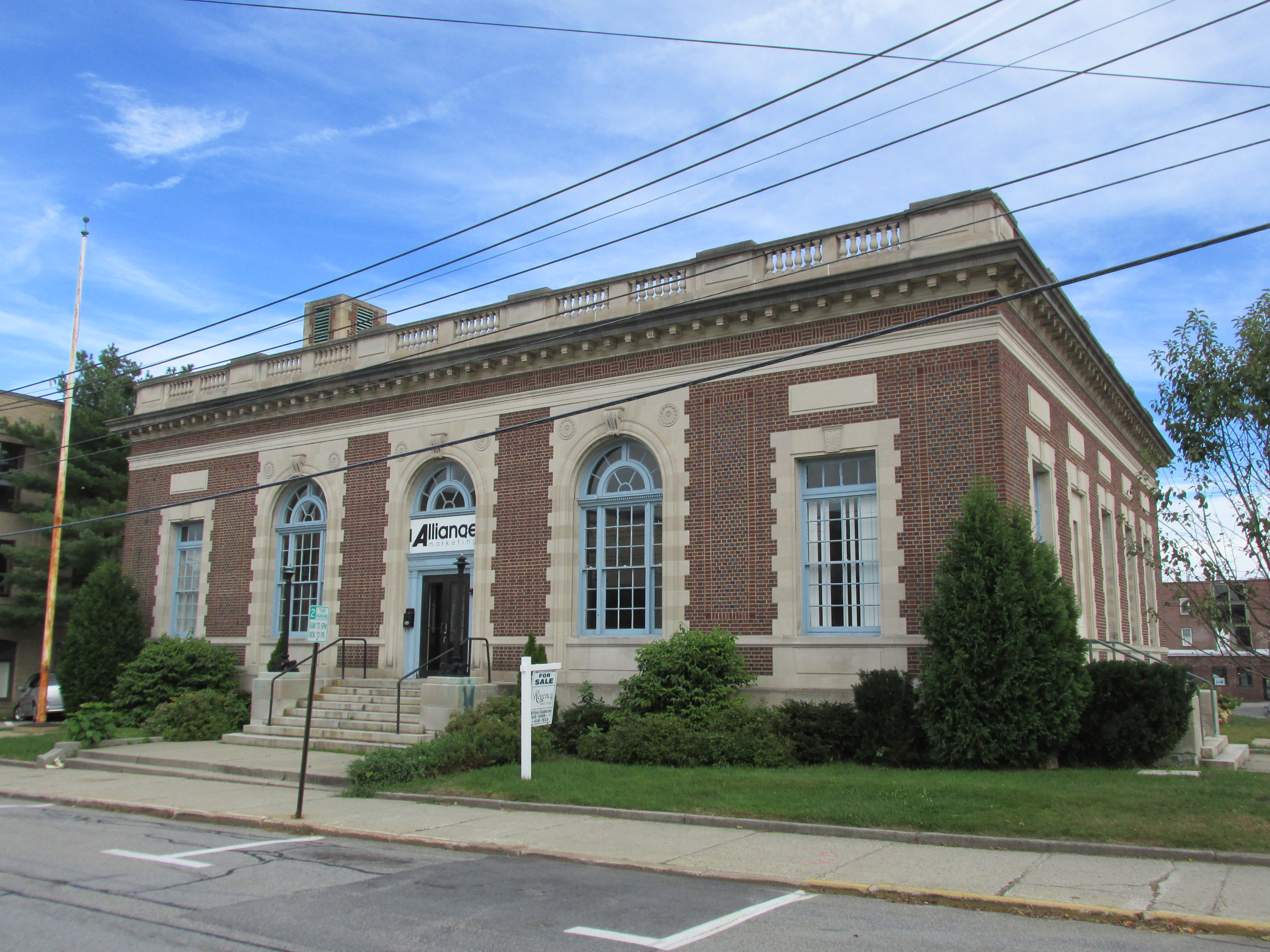

- Location within Maine Location within the United States
- Location: 35 Washington St., Biddeford, Maine
- Coordinates: 43°29′32″N 70°27′21″W
- Area: 0.4 acres (0.16 ha)
- Built: 1914
- Architect: James Knox Taylor
- Architectural style: Classical Revival
- Part of: Biddeford Main Street Historic District (ID09001146)
- NRHP reference No.: 73000161

Significant dates
- Added to NRHP: May 7, 1973
- Designated CP: December 24, 2009

The Old Post Office is a historic former post office building at 35 Washington Street in Biddeford, Maine. Built in 1914, it is a fine local example of Classical Revival architecture, and a prototype for post offices built in the following decades. The property was listed on the National Register of Historic Places in 1973. It now houses commercial offices.

== Description and history ==
The former Post Office stands at the corner of Washington and Federal Streets, at the edge of Biddeford's Main Street business district. It is a single story masonry structure, built with a steel and concrete frame which is clad in red brick and granite trim. Its main facade is five bays wide, each bay articulated by granite quoining. The outer two bays house rectangular windows and are topped by stone panels, while the middle three have round-arch openings. The entrance is in the center bay, and has double doors flanked by pilasters and topped by an entablature that separates it from the half-round transom window. The flat roof has a modillioned cornice and is surrounded by a balustrade. The side facade, facing Federal Street, has a simpler secondary entrance and window bays similar to the outer ones on the main facade.

The building was designed by the Office of the Supervising Architect at the United States Treasury Department, then under the direction of James Knox Taylor. It was built in 1914, and its only major exterior modification has been the replacement of its original revolving front door with the present configuration, which took place in the 1930s. The design of this building is typical of later Classical Revival post offices built in the 1920s and 1930s. The building was government-owned and vacant in 1973, and now houses commercial offices.

== See also ==
- National Register of Historic Places listings in York County, Maine
- List of United States post offices
