= Officina Profumo-Farmaceutica di Santa Maria Novella =

Historic Italian cosmetics company

Coordinates: 43°46′27.62″N 11°14′52.36″E

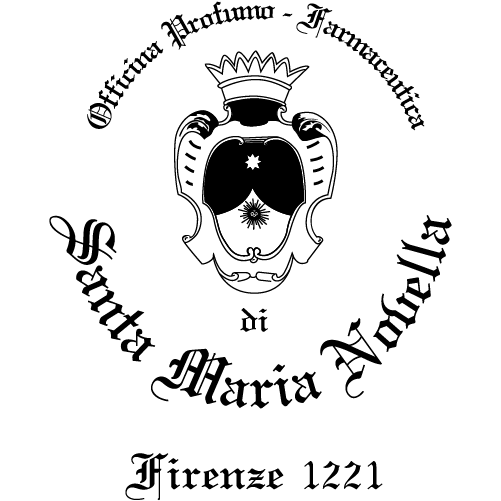
- Industry: Perfumery, cosmetics, herbal products
- Founded: 1221
- Headquarters: Florence, Italy
- Products: Perfumes, Cosmetics
- Parent: Italmobiliare
- Website: www.smnovella.com

The Officina Profumo-Farmaceutica di Santa Maria Novella, also known as the Pharmacy of Santa Maria Novella or the Ancient Apothecary of Santa Maria Novella, is an Italian company active in perfumery, cosmetics, and herbal products, based at Via della Scala 16 in Florence, within the historic premises of the convent complex of the Basilica of Santa Maria Novella.

The company's origins are traced to 1221, when the Dominican Order settled in Florence. Over the following centuries, the convent apothecary developed into an organised activity, with a documented pharmacy in 1508 and an autonomous administrative organisation recorded in 1542.

The year 1612 is traditionally considered the date when the Officina opened to the public. The establishment is described as the oldest pharmacy in the world, a distinction associated with its claimed continuity of site, activity, and apothecary tradition dating to the Dominican settlement in Florence. Over time, the apothecary's activities developed into a business specialising in perfumery, cosmetics, and herbal products.

In 2012, marking the 400th anniversary of the traditional opening date, the Officina was featured in an Italian postage stamp series dedicated to Made in Italy.

== History ==
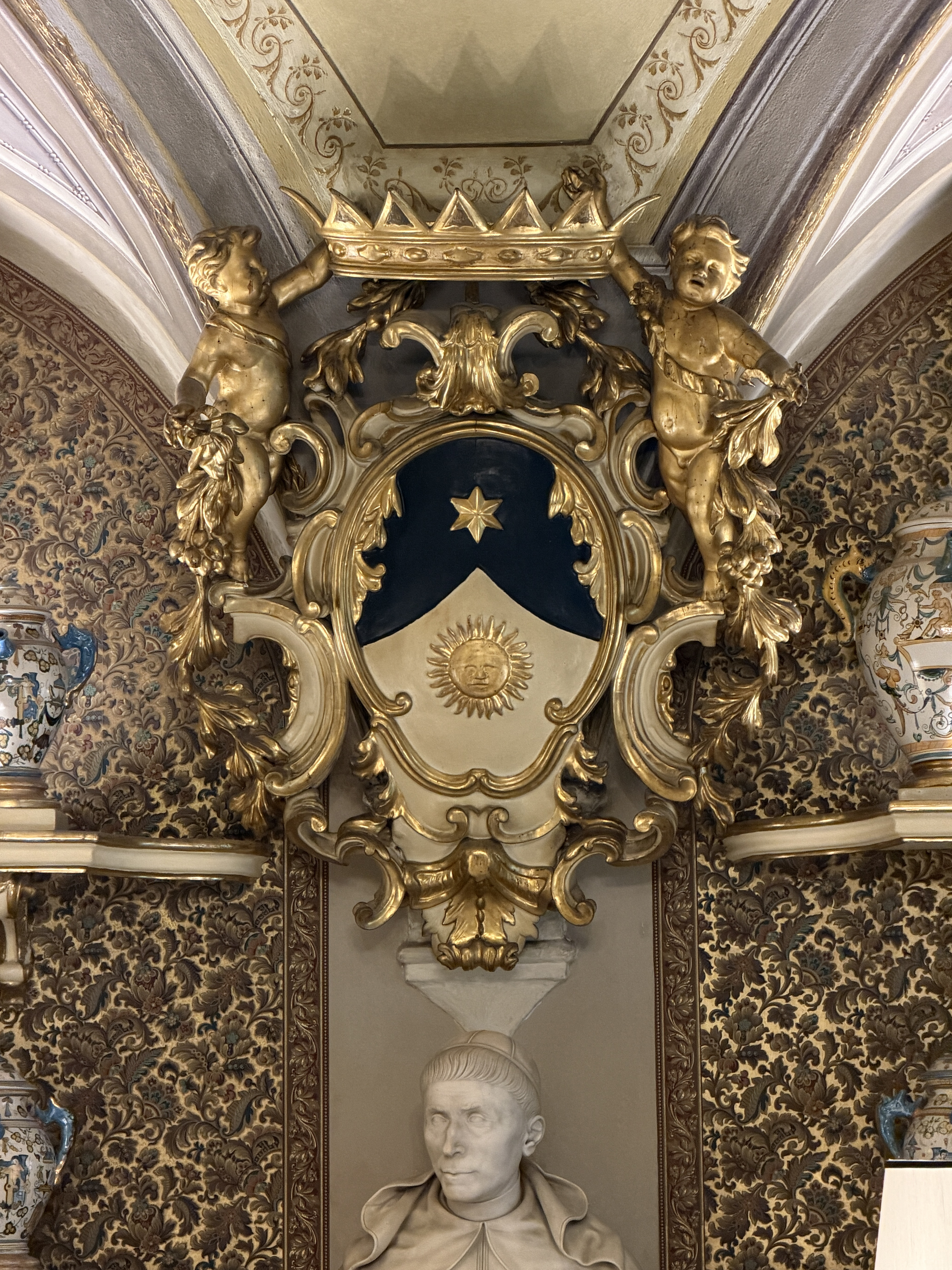
Coat of arms of the Dominicans of Santa Maria Novella

=== Foundation as an apothecary ===
The origin of the Officina is linked to the foundation of the Dominican convent of Santa Maria Novella in 1221. Within the convent, friars cultivated medicinal plants and prepared remedies for the religious community and for the care of the sick.

As early as 1381 it is documented that the Dominicans of Santa Maria Novella sold rose water as a disinfectant, used especially in times of epidemics. The friars cultivated medicinal plants (the semplici, from which the name of the Giardino dei Semplici derives) in an adjacent garden, distilling herbs and flowers and preparing essences, elixirs, ointments and balsams. The garden of the simples supplied mainly the nearby Pharmacy of San Marco, also founded and managed by the Dominican friars.

In 1508 the presence of a small convent pharmacy is attested. By 1542 the apothecary had its own autonomous administrative organisation, as documented by the first Book of Income and Expenses.

=== Development from the 16th to the 18th century ===
Between 1590 and 1591 the apothecary underwent an expansion and reorganisation of its spaces and equipment, with the introduction of new furnishings, instruments and containers.

The year 1612 marks its opening to the public. During this period, the apothecary was managed by the lay apothecary Simone Marchi and the Dominican friar Angiolo Marchissi, a central figure in the development of the Officina during the 17th century. The current perfumery dates to 1612, when it still functioned also as an apothecary. Renowned throughout Europe, it received from Grand Duke Ferdinand II de' Medici the title of Fonderia di Sua Altezza Reale (Foundry of His Royal Highness) in 1659, during the direction of Fra' Angiolo Marchissi. In the 18th century its products were exported as far as India and China.

=== 19th century ===
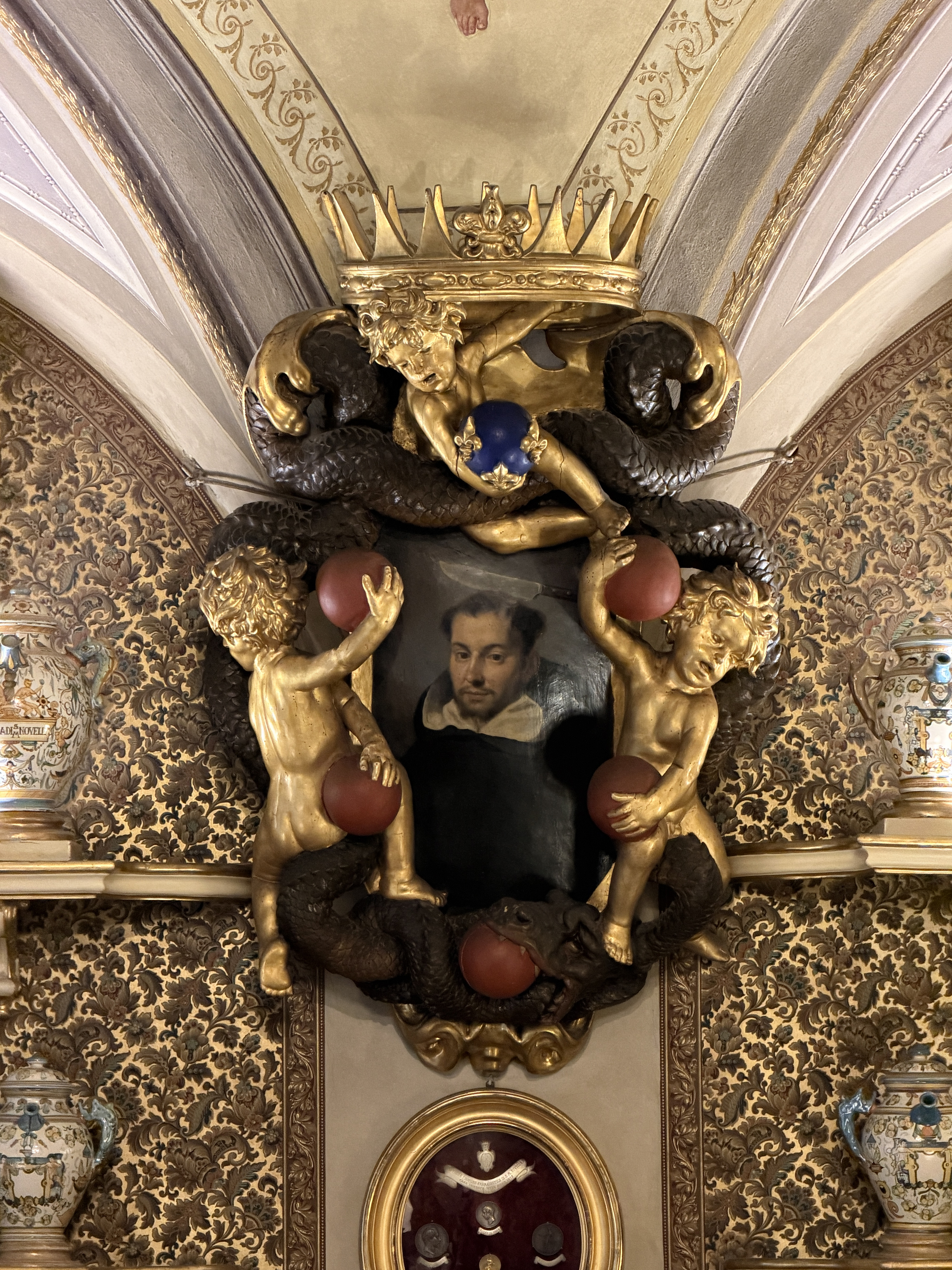
Portrait of Saint Peter of Verona, adorned with the balls of the Medici coat of arms

In the 19th century, under the direction of Fra' Damiano Beni, important reorganisation and expansion works were undertaken, leading to the current configuration. In 1866 the complex passed to the State; in 1867 it was entrusted to Cesare Augusto Stefani for management, and in 1871 it became the property of the Municipality of Florence.

=== Contemporary history ===
During the 20th century the Officina progressively assumed a corporate structure, combining traditional practices with a larger-scale organised production.

From the second half of the 20th century, the activity extended progressively at an international level, with a growing presence in Europe, the Americas and Asia. In parallel, a network of mono-brand retail stores and selective distribution developed, contributing to the transformation of the Officina from a local institution into an internationally recognised brand.

In the second half of the 20th century, part of the production activities was progressively relocated outside the historic premises, which retained representative and commercial functions.

In the 21st century the company further consolidated its global presence, maintaining the historic Florence premises as its identity centre. In 2020 it became part of the Italmobiliare group, which acquired the entirety of the capital in 2021. In the following years the company expanded its international distribution network, with more than 400 points of sale across more than 30 countries.

== Architectural history ==
The Officina is housed within the convent complex of Santa Maria Novella and reflects an architectural stratification from the 14th to the 19th century. A decisive intervention in the current layout occurred between 1847 and 1852, when, under the direction of Fra' Damiano Beni, the architect Enrico Romoli reorganised the spaces and created the monumental entrance on Via della Scala.

The ancient apothecary, today no longer a pharmacy but a perfumery and herbalist's shop, occupies a monumental space with antique decorations and furnishings from various periods. It also preserves a notable collection of scientific instruments such as thermometers, mortars, scales and measures, as well as valuable apothecary jars from the 17th to the 20th century.

== Interiors ==
=== Entrance and corridor ===
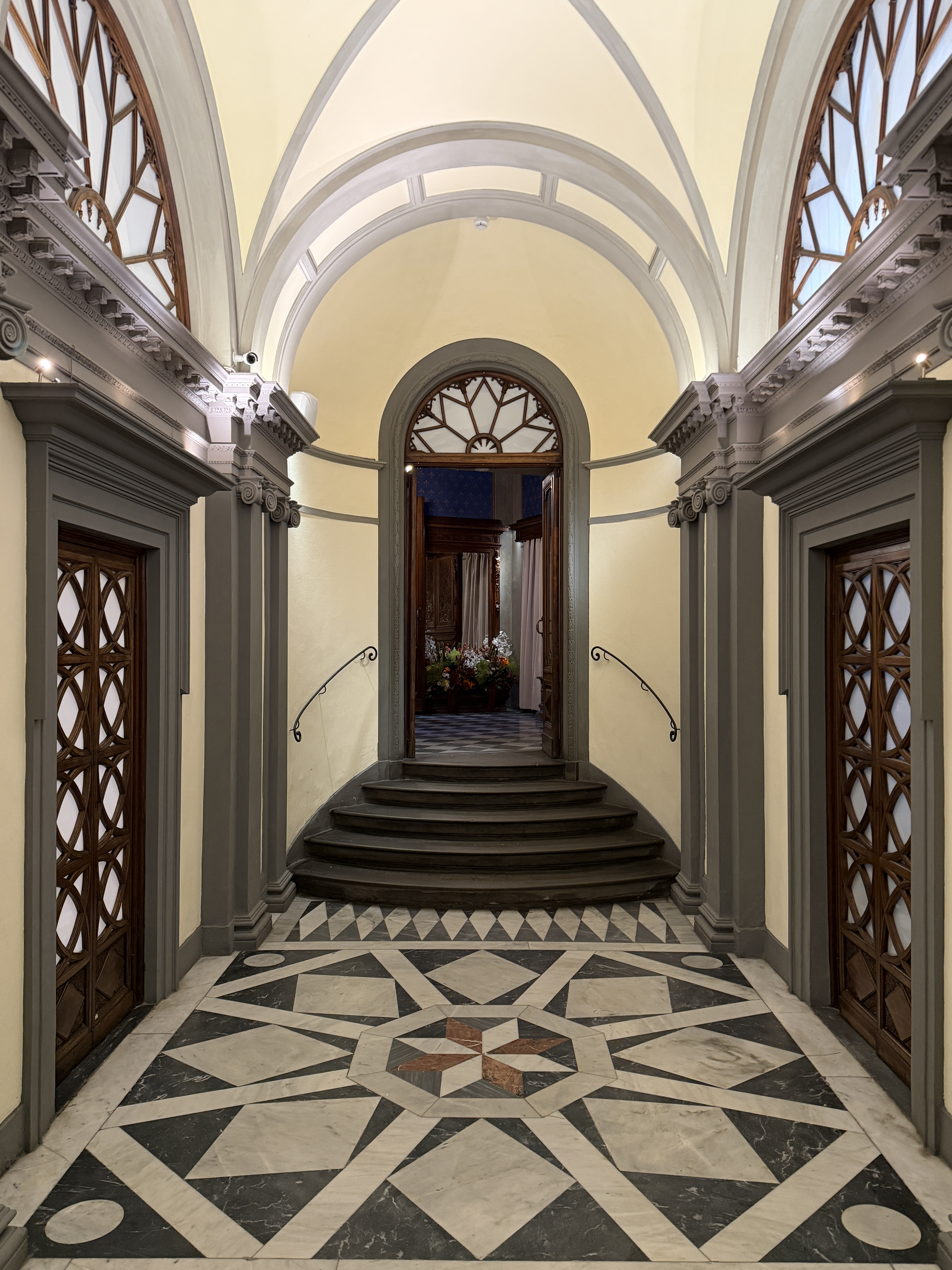
Entrance from Via della Scala 16

The current entrance on Via della Scala dates to the 19th-century works designed by Enrico Romoli. Access to the perfumery sales room is through a finely carved full-arch portal in pietra serena, surmounted by a pediment at the centre of which is the coat of arms of the Dominican friars, recognisable by the radiant sun.

The gallery leading to the Sales Hall is not the original entrance to the Pharmacy; it was opened only at the end of the 18th century. The official opening of the pharmacy to the public in 1612 gave access from the Great Cloister of Santa Maria Novella, today belonging to the Carabinieri Non-Commissioned Officers' School, through the shell-shaped portal designed by Matteo Nigetti. The ancient apothecary, today a herbalist's shop, served as the sales and display room from 1612 to 1848.

In the classicising atrium, two exedrae open on either side, each with a marble statue: Hygieia and Galen, the personification of the goddess of health and the god of medicine respectively. The small vestibule is in the neo-Gothic style, with predominantly blue and gold decorations, and gives access to the main sales room.

=== Grand Sales Hall ===
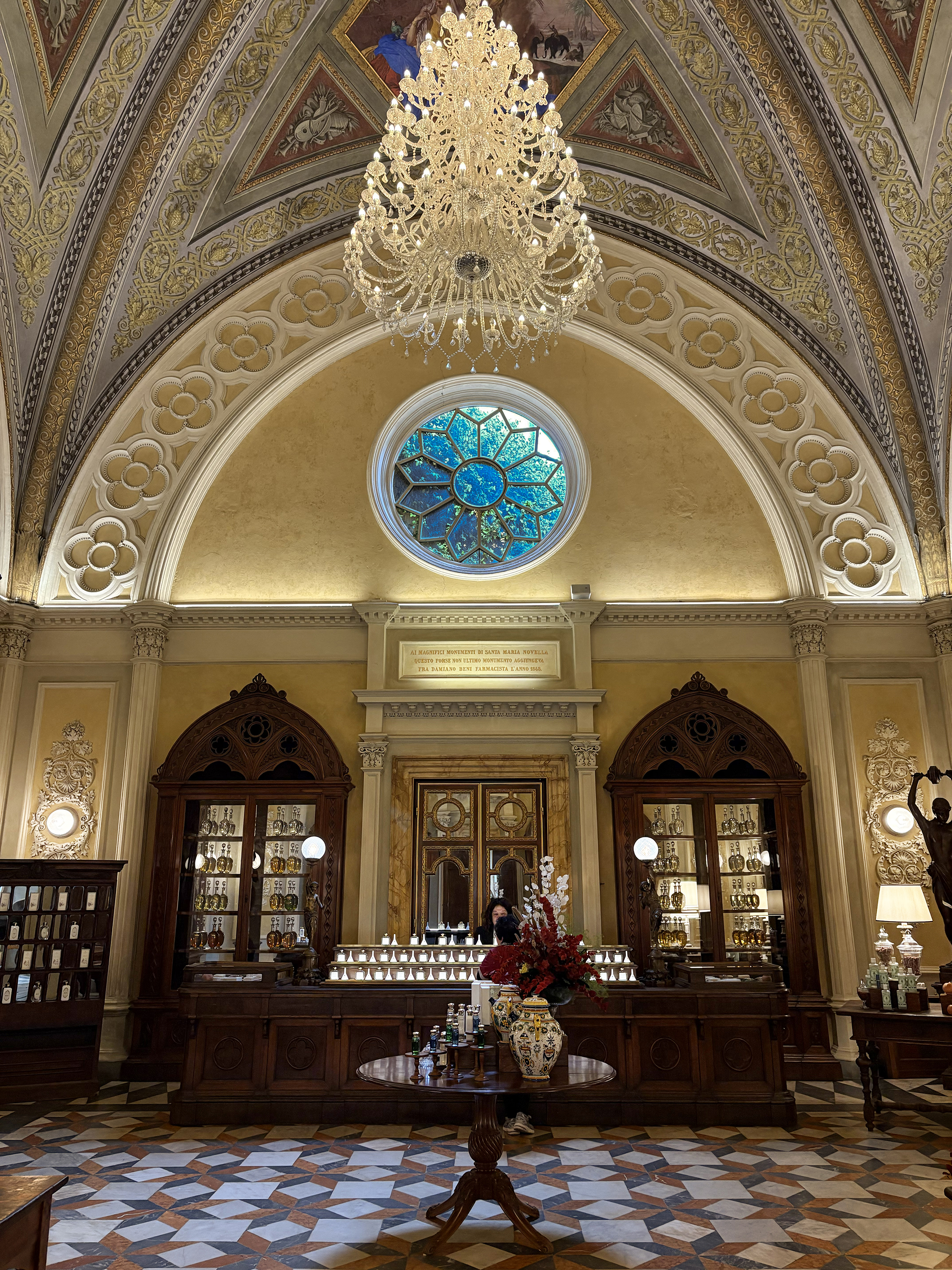
Grand Sales Hall

The Grand Sales Hall was originally one of the convent's chapels, dedicated to Saint Nicholas of Bari, under the patronage of the wealthy Acciaioli family. According to tradition, the chapel was a gift of gratitude from Dardano Acciaioli to the Dominican friars. It is recounted that Dardano was ill and doctors could neither diagnose nor cure his illness. To protect their reputation, they prescribed a particular grape called «ursina» or «lugliola», which was almost impossible to find at that time of year. The absence of recovery would thus be attributed to the impossibility of procuring the «medicine». The friars of Santa Maria Novella, upon learning of this, gathered this grape from their garden and offered it to Dardano, who miraculously recovered. The nobleman proposed to the Dominicans that he donate something to remain in perpetual memory, and they asked him to contribute to the construction of a chapel «for the benefit of the sick». The chapel arose near the infirmary so that the sick could follow the religious services from their own beds.

At the end of the 17th century it was granted to the Confraternity of Sant'Anna dei Palafrenieri, who undertook restorations and modifications: they opened the entrance onto Via della Scala and rebuilt the vault and roof. Once suppressed under the reforms of Pietro Leopoldo, the Confraternity's premises were converted into a warehouse. A major renovation took place in 1848, when the growing fame of the pharmacy made an adequate salon for customers necessary. All works were commissioned by Fra' Damiano Beni, one of the most important directors of the pharmacy. The space was divided into two areas: sales hall and warehouse. On that occasion, the vault was decorated by Paolino Sarti with allegories of the four continents, following the iconographic convention of the time (Europe, Asia, Africa and America), to indicate the international reach and fame of the Officina. The furnishings consist of neo-Gothic walnut cabinets in which the Officina's products are displayed.

=== Green Room ===
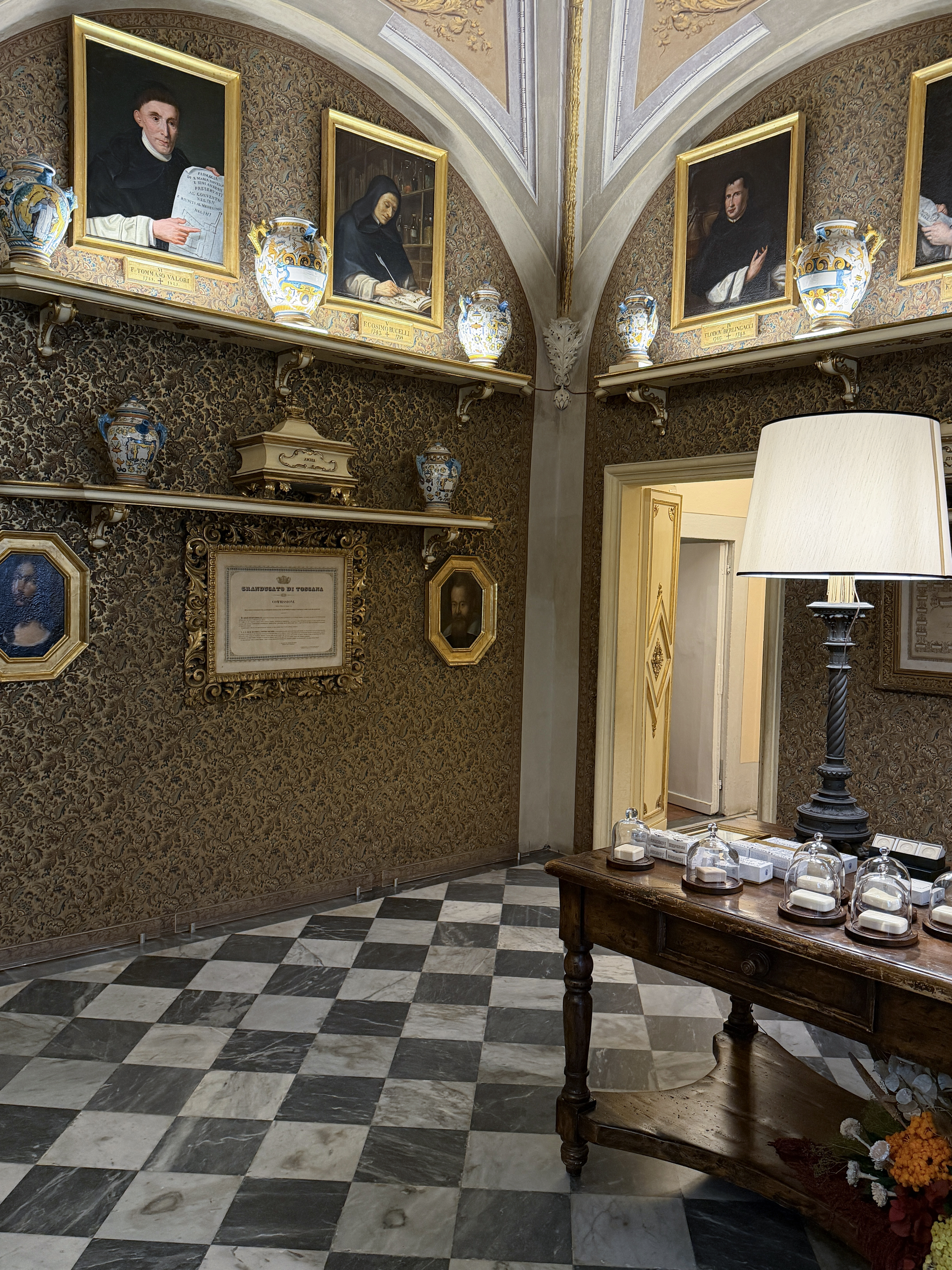
The Green Room

To the right is the so-called Green Room (Sala Verde), overlooking the garden, built between 1335 and 1337 between the convent infirmary and the chapel as a private apartment, though never used as such. From 1542, the year in which the first book of income and expenses marked the beginning of the pharmacy's commercial activity, this room housed the pyramid-shaped distillation ovens, the stoves and the glassware. In the 18th century the Green Room became a reception room for distinguished guests, who were served the pharmacy's specialities such as Alkermes or China, and above all chocolate, then a highly fashionable drink. Today the room is furnished with Directoire style furniture of the 18th century.

On the right wall, the effigy of the Dominican saint Peter of Verona by Lorenzo Lippi dominates, set in a carved and gilded crowned shield surrounded by three putti holding the Medici balls, and around which a serpent, the attribute of the god of medicine Aesculapius, is coiled. The coat of arms and the effigy, which perhaps conceals a portrait, was donated before 1659 by Grand Duke Ferdinand II to the rector Fra' Angiolo Marchissi, as a demonstration of Medici favour towards the institution.

On the opposite wall is the coat of arms of the Dominicans of Santa Maria Novella with the rich carved and gilded frame, beneath which is the marble bust of Fra' Tommaso Valori, one of the directors. Above hang portraits of all the Officina's directors since 1612, the year of official foundation.

=== Room of the Ancient Apothecary ===
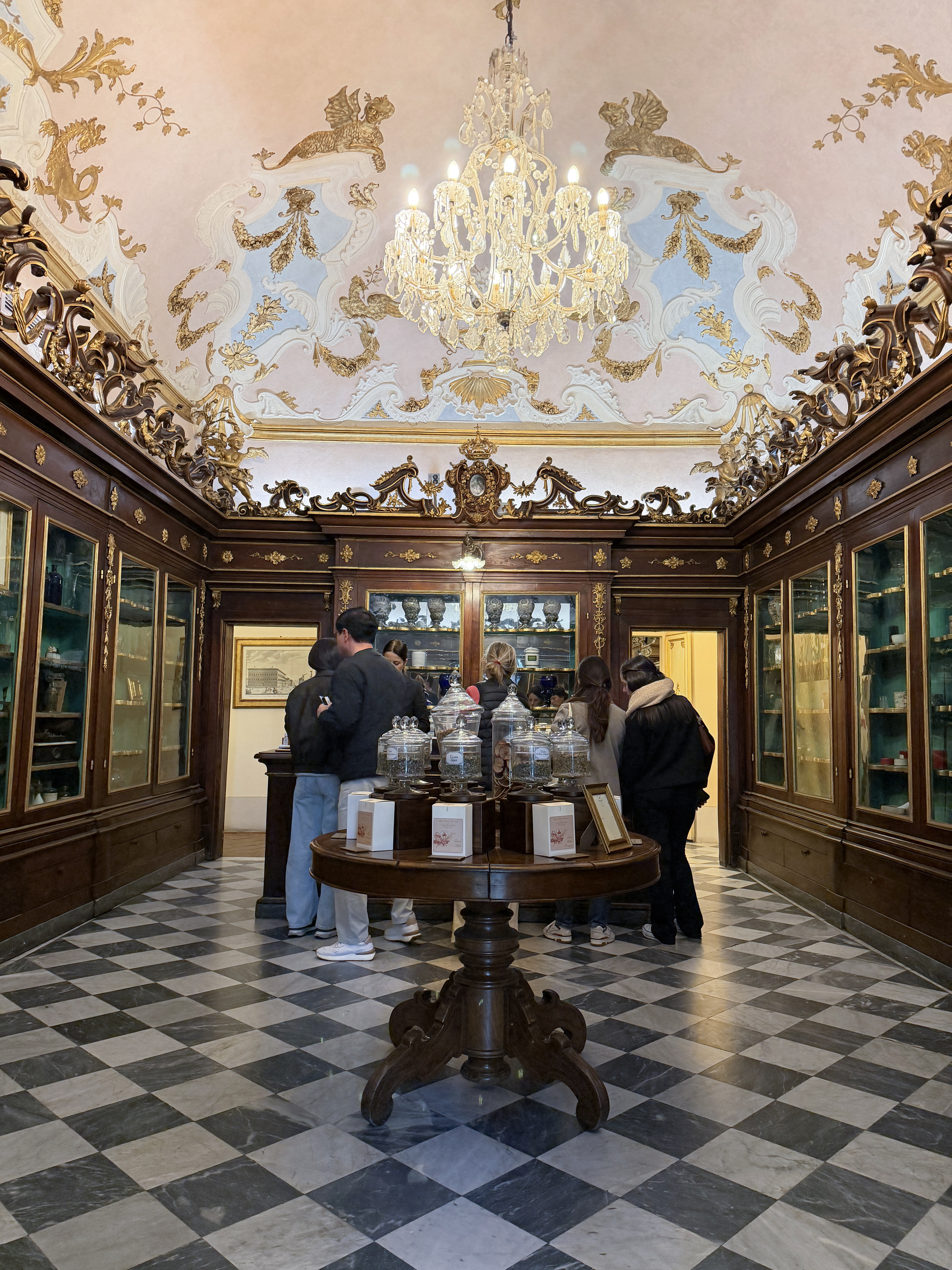
The Ancient Apothecary

The Ancient Apothecary, today a herbalist's shop, was the sales room from 1612 to 1848. Access was from the Great Cloister of Santa Maria Novella through the portal designed by Matteo Nigetti, on the sides of which two plaques still exist recalling the friars' pharmaceutical activity, privileges granted by the Grand Duke and illustrious guests of the pharmacy.

In 1755 it underwent an important renovation of furnishings and decorations. Today the room is enriched by the rich stucco decoration of the 18th-century vaulted ceiling, with fantastic animals, sphinxes, dragons, golden eagles, masks, garlands of fruit and roses, all motifs typical of the repertoire of the period. Some elements, the ribbons and garlands, recur in the woodcarving that crowns the 17th-century cabinets. In the cabinet on the entrance wall, at the centre of the carving, there is a garland of roses in gilded wood, surmounted by a crown, inside which the Mystical Marriage of Saint Catherine of Alexandria is depicted.

=== Sacristy ===
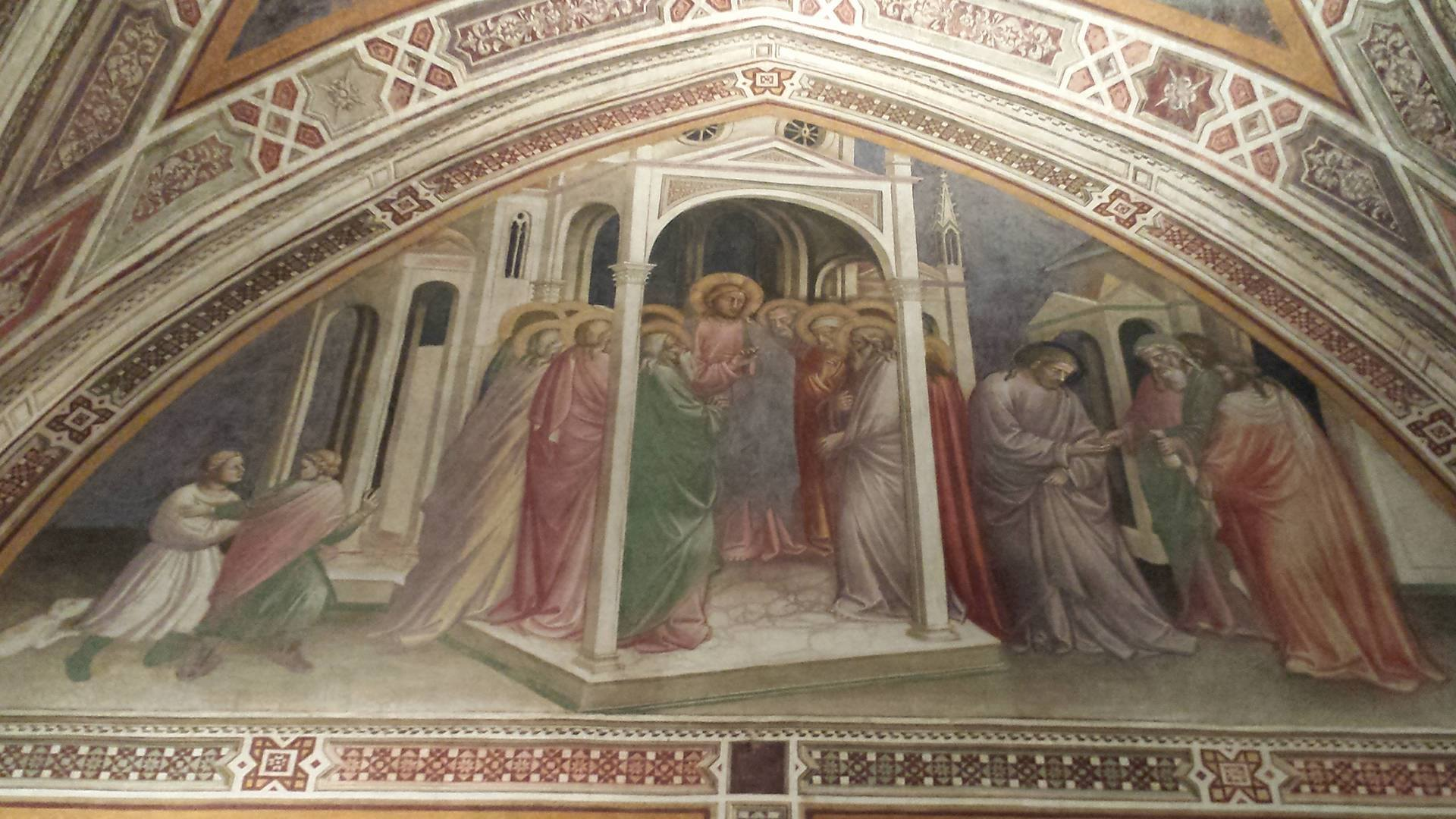
A lunette frescoed by Mariotto di Nardo

Used since the 17th century as an aromataria, it was the room where distilled waters were kept and was thus called the «Water Room». The walls are completely frescoed with scenes of the Passion of Christ by Mariotto di Nardo between 1385 and 1405. In 2012, for the 400th anniversary of the company, all the premises on Via della Scala were restored.

In the original 14th-century fresco, the 19th-century intervention was the most impactful: the vault was entirely repainted in that period and, on a starry sky background, the four evangelists were represented.

During the most recent restoration, Daniela Dini succeeded in completely freeing the vault from the 19th-century overpaint, restoring the original by Mariotto di Nardo. The four 19th-century evangelists gave way to three saints and a bishop: a Franciscan (Saint Bernard of Quintavalle), a Benedictine (Saint Benedict), a Dominican (Saint Thomas) and a bishop (Saint Nicholas).

== Scientific collections ==
Throughout the Pharmacy various scientific instruments and containers are on display, datable between the 17th and 20th centuries. The collection consists of three groups: ceramic pharmacy jars (manufactures from Montelupo, Richard-Ginori and Chini), pharmacy glassware (bottles, alembics and other items) and scientific instruments proper (thermometers, mortars, scales, measures).

In the display cases of the Room of the Ancient Apothecary, old alembics and other instruments used to extract and synthesise perfumes and medicinal compounds are exhibited; the tall-stemmed thermometers of the Accademia del Cimento are copies: the originals are held at the Museo Galileo in Florence.

=== Other spaces ===
Adjacent to the Apothecary are the large cellars where products have been stored for centuries. From here one can also access the Tisaneria and the ancient distillery; these spaces overlook the herb garden where the friars cultivated medicinal plants, near the second entrance on Piazza Santa Maria Novella (open only on special occasions).

== Activity ==
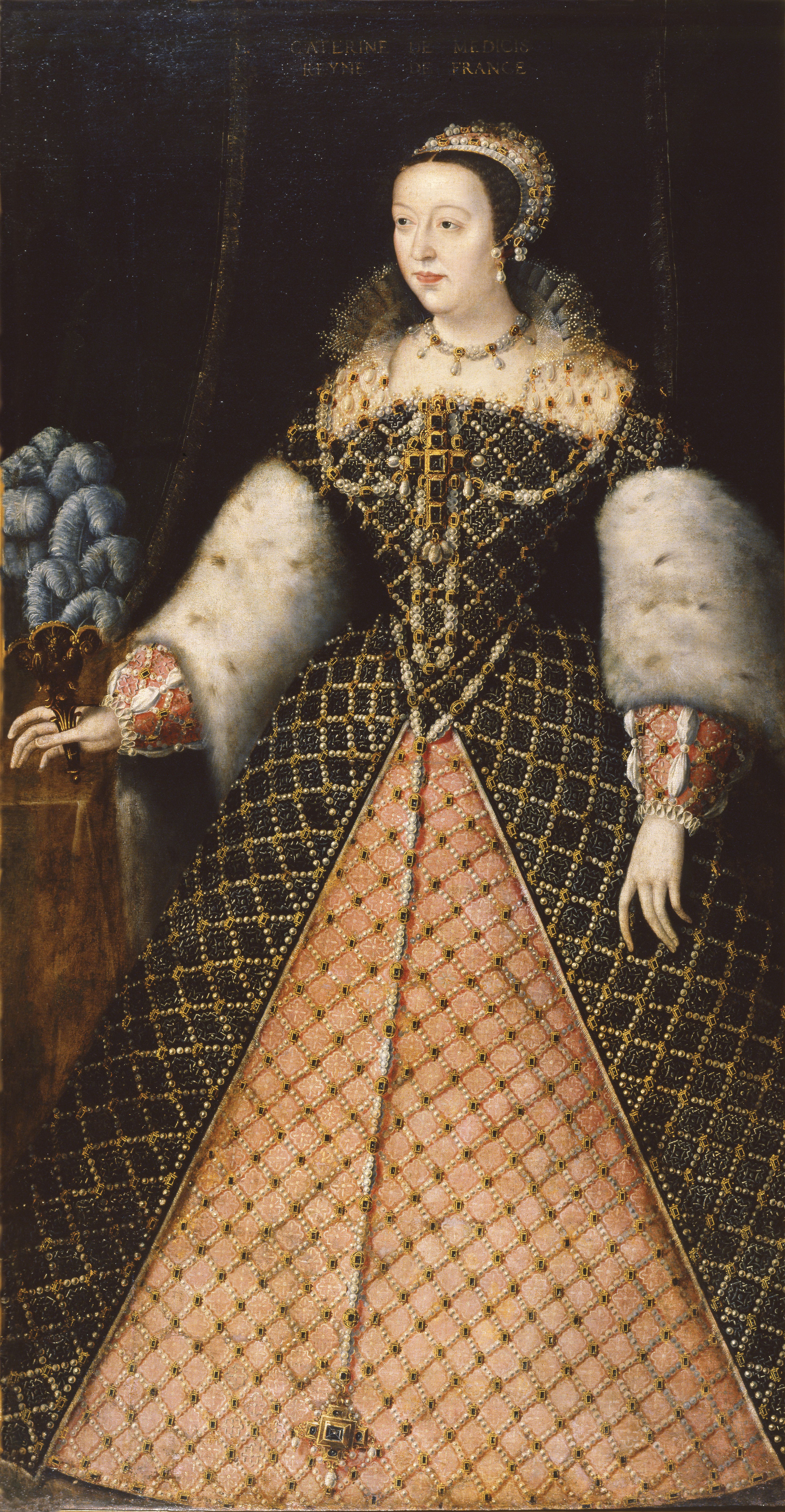
Catherine de' Medici

The Officina operates in perfumery, cosmetics and herbal products, developing formulations rooted in the pharmaceutical and botanical tradition from which it originates. Production encompasses fragrances, personal care preparations and products for interiors.

== Historical preparations ==
Several documented preparations reflect the continuity of the Officina's activity over the centuries.

Rose water is attested in the Dominican apothecary as early as 1381, when it was used as a disinfectant, particularly during periods of epidemic.

The Acqua della Regina, also known as Acqua di Santa Maria Novella, is the Officina's oldest fragrance. Traditionally attributed to 1533 and the apothecary Renato Bianco, it was created as a wedding gift from Catherine de' Medici for the future King of France Henry of Valois.

The pot-pourri, made from dried leaves, roots and flowers, is documented among the apothecary's preparations from the 17th century onwards.

Alkermes, an aromatic liqueur based on spices, was among the specialities served to guests in the Green Room during the 18th century, along with the Elixir of China and chocolate.

== Cultural significance ==
The Officina Profumo-Farmaceutica di Santa Maria Novella has been documented in continuous activity since 1221, the year of the Dominican settlement in the Florentine convent complex, with an unbroken presence attested by the pharmacy of 1508 and the opening to the public in 1612. By virtue of its documented continuity of site, activity and preparatory tradition, it is recognised as the oldest pharmacy in the world.

== Bibliography ==
- Gabriella Mancini (ed.), L'Officina Profumo-Farmaceutica di Santa Maria Novella in Firenze, Rome, 1994.
- Sandra Giovannini, La farmacia di Santa Maria Novella, Florence, 1987.
- Touring Club Italiano, Firenze e il suo territorio, Milan, 2018.
