= Hills Beach =

Seaside community in Biddeford, Maine

Coordinates: 43.458°N 70.377°W

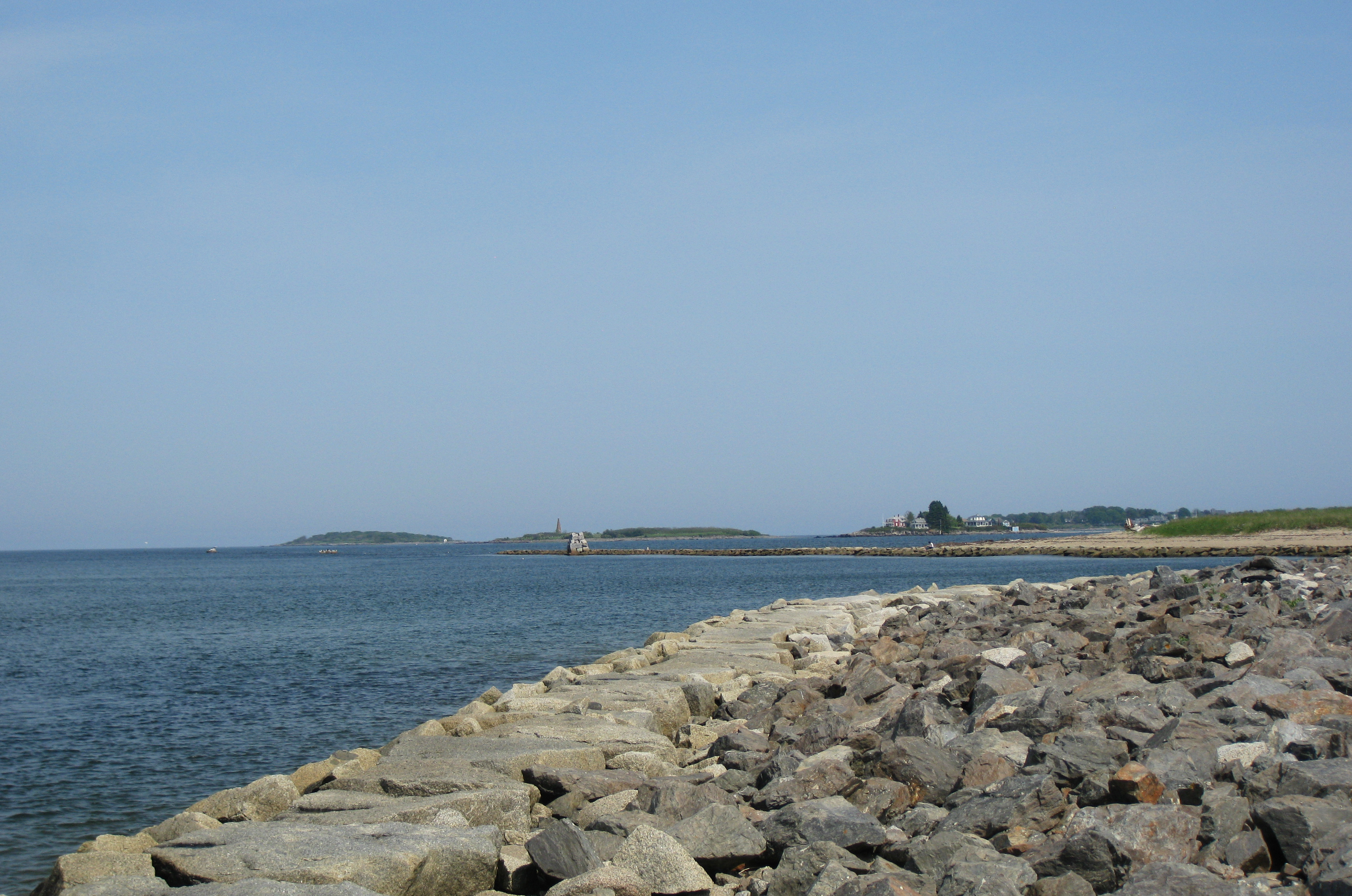
View of Hills Beach, Basket Island, Stage Island, and Wood Island from the mouth of the Saco River

Hills Beach is a seaside community in Biddeford, York County, Maine, United States, approximately 85 miles (140 km) north of Boston, Massachusetts.

Hills Beach is a narrow stretch of sandy beach on the north side of Biddeford Pool near the mouth of the Saco River and near the Saco Bay. The beach is protected by a breakwater on the north side and the curve of the cove to the south. Access to Hills Beach is at the entrance to the University of New England. Hills Beach is located near Basket Island, Wood Island Light, Stage Island, and others.

== See also ==
- List of beaches in New England
- List of islands of Maine
- Fortunes Rocks, Maine
