= First Parish Meetinghouse =

Historic church in Maine, United States

- U.S. National Register of Historic Places
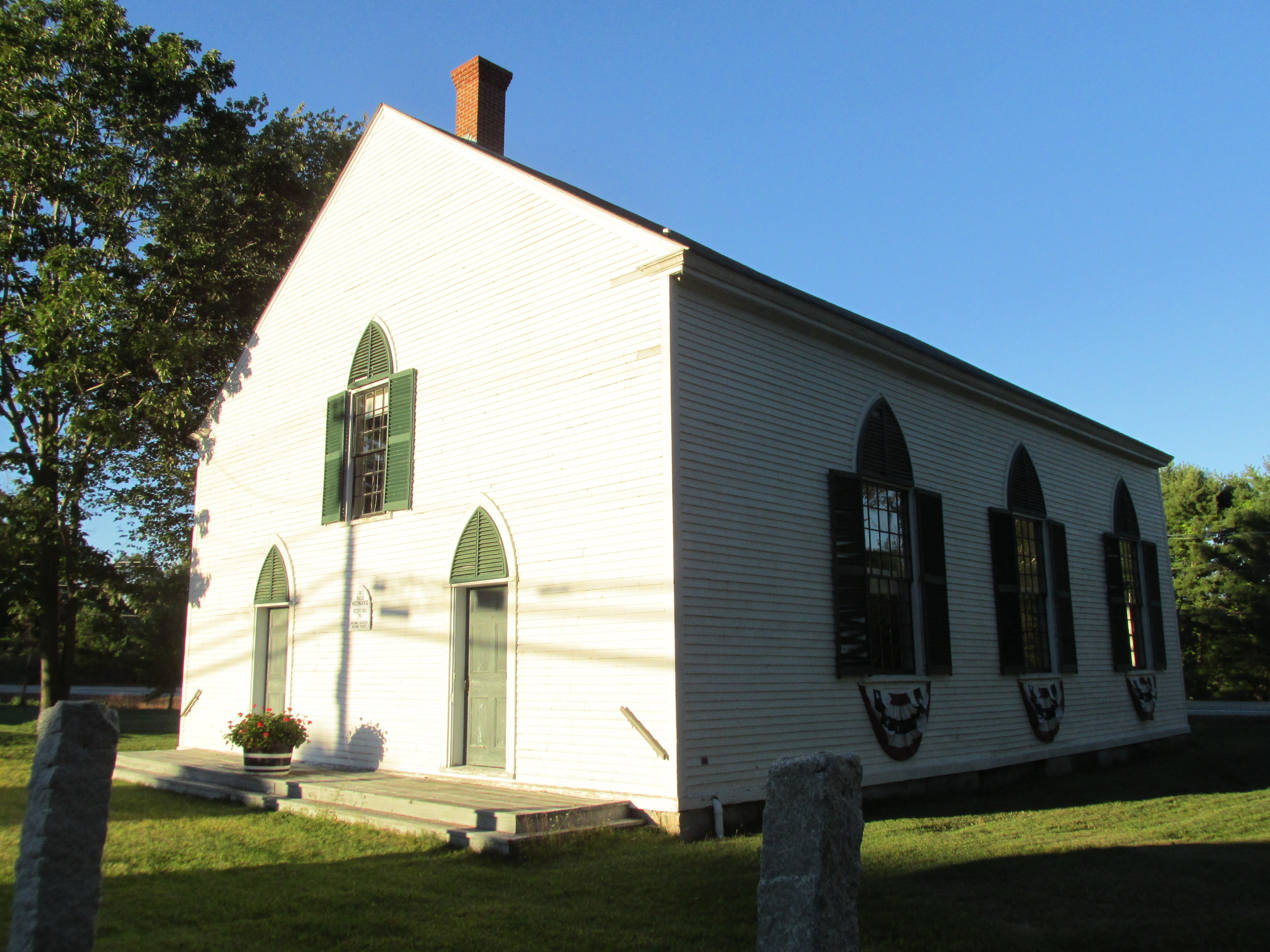
- First Parish Meetinghouse

- Location within Maine Location within the United States
- Location: Old Pool Rd., Biddeford, Maine
- Coordinates: 43°28′31″N 70°24′56″W
- Area: less than one acre
- Built: 1758
- Architect: Perkins, Nathaniel
- NRHP reference No.: 72000080
- Added to NRHP: October 26, 1972

The First Parish Meetinghouse is a historic colonial meeting house at Meeting House Road and Old Pool Road in Biddeford, Maine. Built in 1758, it is the oldest public building in the city, and is one of the oldest buildings of its type in the state. It served as a combined church and town hall until about 1840. It was listed on the National Register of Historic Places in 1972. It is now owned by the Biddeford Historical Society.

== Description and history ==
The First Parish Meetinghouse is located at the triangular intersection of Old Pool Road (Maine State Routes 9 and 208) and Meeting House Road. Set facing west, toward Meeting House Road, it is a single-story wood frame structure, with a front-facing gable roof, clapboard siding, and a granite foundation. Its front facade is symmetrically arranged, with a pair of entrances at the ground level, and a single window in the gable at the gallery level. The doorways and all windows are topped by lancet-arched Gothic louvers. The main structure is built out of hand-hewn timbers. The building originally had a belfry; this was apparently removed during alterations in 1840, in which the pulpit was lowered and soundboard removed.

The meetinghouse was built in 1758 by Nathaniel Perkins, a local master builder, pursuant to a vote by the Biddeford town meeting. The congregation that met here is the "mother congregation" of both the congregation church in adjacent Saco and the present UCC congregation in Biddeford. The meeting house was an important site in the community during the American Revolutionary War, when local organizing activities were held here. It is also notable for its association with James Sullivan, who rose to prominence as a lawyer here and eventually became Governor of Massachusetts.

Today, the meeting house is used by the Biddeford Historical Society to hold lectures and educational events about Biddeford's history such as reenactment performances.

== See also ==
- National Register of Historic Places listings in York County, Maine
