= Biddeford Pool =

Tidal pool in Maine, United States

Coordinates: 43°26′43″N 70°21′31″W

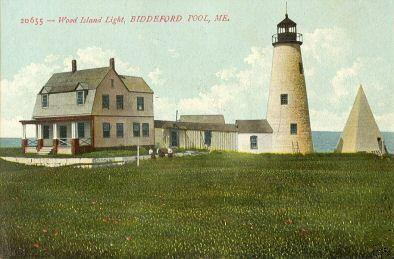
Wood Island Light in 1910

Biddeford Pool is a neighborhood within the city of Biddeford, Maine, named for a large tidal pool located off Saco Bay south of the mouth of the Saco River. It is approximately 6 miles (10 km) southeast of downtown Biddeford, to which it is connected via State Route 208. The center of Kennebunkport is 10 miles (16 km) to the southwest, connected via State Route 9. Biddeford Pool has a post office with the ZIP Code 04006.

== Background ==
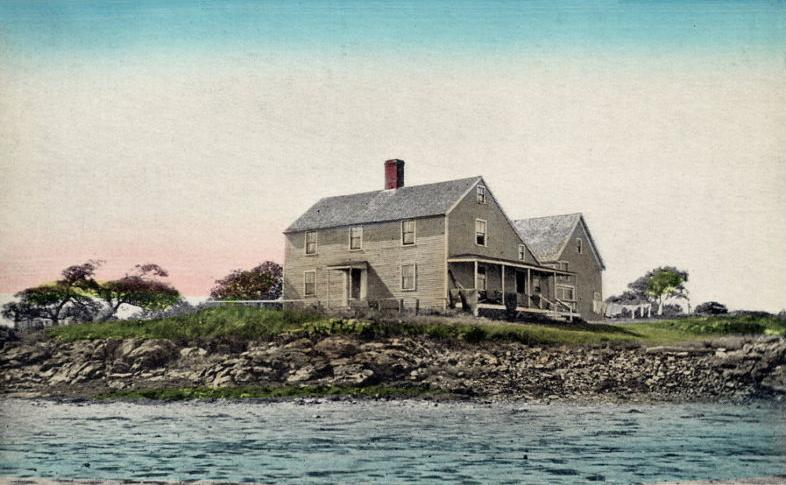
Tristram Goldthwaite House c. 1910

Biddeford Pool is the site of Maine's first recorded permanent settlement, then called Winter Harbor (not to be confused with present-day Winter Harbor, Maine). In the winter of 1616-1617, Richard Vines, a physician, resided here as part of the colonization efforts of Sir Ferdinando Gorges, lord proprietor of Maine. An early village developed on the north side. In 1688, Fort Mary was built near the pool's entrance.

The former Fletcher's Neck Lifesaving Station, closed in 1971 and on the National Register of Historic Places, still stands at Ocean Avenue and Fourth Street.

During World War II the Biddeford Pool Military Reservation was established from 1941 to 1945, on what is now the Abenakee Golf Club. It had four circular concrete platforms called "Panama mounts" for 155 mm guns, three of which remain today. From December 1941 to 12 February 1943 it was garrisoned by Battery F of the 240th Coast Artillery of the Maine National Guard; this unit was then relieved by Battery E of the 22nd Coast Artillery, which departed in October 1943; it is unclear what unit was at the site after that time.

The small harbor hosts both vacationers and lobstermen. Its water level fluctuates from a large navigable body during high tide to mostly mudflats during low tide. The only exception is the deep mouth, where a gut is located which is naturally dredged by tidal current. It is locally known as "The Gut." Consequently, this is the area where most boats are moored. Wood Island Light is located about a mile offshore to the northeast.

Biddeford Pool is bounded by the mainland to the south and west, by Hills Beach to the north, and by East Point to the east. The area is a popular summer destination for visitors from as far south as Florida and as far west as California. The pool is surrounded by tall grass salt marshes that are home to a variety of birds and other wildlife. East Point Sanctuary, maintained by the Maine Audubon Society, is considered to be one of the premier birding spots on the northeast coast. Mile Stretch Road, a sandy strip of beach which connects the neighborhood of Biddeford Pool to the mainland, is a notable tombolo.

Points of interest around Biddeford Pool include the Biddeford coastal neighborhoods of Hills Beach, Fortune's Rocks, and Granite Point; and the Kennebunkport coastal area of Goose Rocks.
