= The Pilot's Wife =

Novel by Anita Shreve

- First edition cover
- Author: Anita Shreve
- Language: English
- Genre: Novel
- Publisher: Little, Brown
- Publication date: May 1998
- Publication place: United States
- Media type: Print (hardback & paperback)
- Pages: 293 pp (hardback edition)
- ISBN: 0-316-78908-9 (hardback edition)
- OCLC: 38096984
- Dewey Decimal: 813/.54 21
- LC Class: PS3569.H7385 P55 1998
- Preceded by: Sea Glass

The Pilot's Wife : A Novel is a 1998 novel by Anita Shreve. It is chronologically the third novel in Shreve's informal trilogy to be set in a large beach house on the New Hampshire coast that used to be a convent. It is preceded by Fortune's Rocks and Sea Glass.

The novel was chosen as an Oprah's Book Club selection for March 1999.

== Plot summary ==
The novel is about Kathryn Lyons, whose husband, Jack Lyons, dies in a plane crash over the Atlantic Ocean off the coast of Malin Head, Ireland. As she and her daughter Mattie try to cope with this sudden loss, she finds herself bombarded by the press. While she and the airlines try to find the reason for the crash, she slowly unravels a series of secrets her husband has kept from her until she realizes that he lived a double life she never knew about.

== Adaptation ==
The novel was adapted into a made-for-TV movie in 2002 on CBS.
