= Sea Glass (novel) =

2002 novel by Anita Shreve

- First edition cover
- Author: Anita Shreve
- Language: English
- Publisher: Little, Brown and Company
- Publication date: April 9, 2002
- Publication place: United States
- Media type: Print (hardback & paperback)
- Pages: 384 pp
- ISBN: 0-316-78081-2
- OCLC: 49225580
- Dewey Decimal: 813/.54 21
- LC Class: PS3569.H7385 S43 2002
- Preceded by: Fortune's Rocks
- Followed by: The Pilot's Wife

Sea Glass is a 2002 romance novel by Anita Shreve, first published on April 9, 2022 by Little, Brown and Company. It is chronologically the second novel in Shreve's informal trilogy to be set in a large beach house on the New Hampshire coast that used to be a convent. It is preceded by Fortune's Rocks and followed by The Pilot's Wife.

== Summary ==
"The only problem with looking for sea glass...is that you never look up. You never see the view. You never see the houses or the ocean, because you're afraid you'll miss something in the sand."

In 1929 New England, the newly married Sexton and Honora Beecher arrange to buy the old beach house they are renting, but when the Depression strikes their small town, their hopes are dashed. Sexton goes to work at the nearby mill and becomes involved with a plan to form a union, which eventually leads to disaster; events conspire to undermine the Beechers' marriage as well as their financial hopes and dreams.
