= Testimony (Shreve novel) =

2008 novel by Anita Shreve

- Author: Anita Shreve
- Language: English
- Publisher: Little, Brown & Co.
- Publication date: 2008
- Publication place: United States
- ISBN: 9780316059862

Testimony is a 2008 novel by American writer Anita Shreve. The audiobook is narrated by Nick Sullivan. The novel describes an unfolding sex scandal at a Massachusetts prep school.

== Synopsis ==
Testimony tells the story of a sex scandal at a prestigious prep school called Avery Academy in Avery, Massachusetts - a small town with many blue collar workers. This school has a good reputation for sending students to Ivy League schools, but everything changes when this scandal is mishandled and covered up by the administration. The novel switches point-of-view and discusses the incident from multiple perspectives. Some of the most notable include: Mike Bordwin, the headmaster of the school; Rob Leicht, a member of the basketball team with prospects of going to Brown University; Ellen Leicht, Rob's mother; Silas Quinney, a local boy whose mother is having an affair with the school's headmaster; Owen Quinney, a local farmer and Silas's father; Noelle, Silas's girlfriend; James "J. Dot" Robles, a postgraduate basketball player; and Sienna, the only girl involved in the sex scandal; and Geoff Coggeshall, the dean of students who takes over as headmaster after the scandal.

All of these perspectives are mini "interviews" conducted by a journalist at the University of Vermont who is trying to get to the bottom of this incident.
