= Fortune's Rocks (novel) =

1999 novel by Anita Shreve

- First edition cover
- Author: Anita Shreve
- Language: English
- Genre: Romance
- Publisher: Little, Brown and Company
- Publication date: December 2, 1999
- Publication place: United States
- Media type: Print (hardback & paperback)
- Pages: 453 pp
- ISBN: 0-316-78101-0
- OCLC: 41991464
- Dewey Decimal: 813/.54 21
- LC Class: PS3569.H7385 F67 2000
- Followed by: Sea Glass

Fortune's Rocks is a 1999 romance novel by bestselling author Anita Shreve. It is the first novel in Shreve's tetralogy to be set in a large beach house on the New Hampshire coast that used to be a convent. Chronologically, it is followed by Sea Glass, The Pilot's Wife and Body Surfing.

== Plot ==
In the summer of 1899, Olympia Biddeford, a privileged, intelligent 15-year-old, and her parents have retired from the heat of Boston to the coastal resort of Fortune's Rocks. When the successful Dr. John Haskell is invited to stay, no one foresees the affair that is to follow between her and this 41-year-old man. Their passionate affair, and subsequent discovery, produce a son and leads to far-reaching consequences that span several decades. Olympia's son is taken from her immediately at birth, and despite attending a women's college she is miserable and only thinks of Haskell and her son, escaping back to the cottage at Fortune's Rocks. Here she learns of her son, Pierre Haskall, who is now three and adopted into a loving French family. In her pursuit of her child's custody, she employs Mr Tucker as a lawyer, yet realises when she wins the court case that she cannot bear to take a child from its adoptive mother. In the months that follow, Olympia transforms the Fortune's Rocks residence into a shelter for disadvantaged women, similar to her own experiences, and marries Haskell. In the ending, it is found that her son's adoptive parent has passed and she is to decide what happens to the child.

The novel is loosely based on the seaside neighborhood of Fortunes Rocks, located in Biddeford, Maine.
