= Stella Bain =

American novel by Anita Shreve

- Author: Anita Shreve
- Language: English
- Genre: Fiction
- Publisher: Little, Brown and Company/Hachette Book Group
- Publication date: November 12, 2013
- Publication place: United States
- Pages: 272 pp.
- ISBN: 978-0-316-09886-1
- OCLC: 827257567

Stella Bain is an American novel by Anita Shreve, set during World War I. The book was released on November 12, 2013 by Little, Brown and Company.

== Synopsis ==
The book tells a story of a woman whose real name is Etna Bliss, but she doesn't remember it due to her concussion which turn out to be a hysteria that she got when she ran away from her American husband to London. There, she becomes an ambulance driver serving during World War I. During one of her shifts, while wearing only a VAD uniform she got hit by a bombardment. After it, she is being awoken at the Abyssinian hospital with shell shock. A cranial surgeon and psychologist named August Bridge finds her in that state next year in London, and becomes her mentor for a time being. While in his care, Etna begins to draw houses and people that she knew of but couldn't remember from where. Later on, she begins to remember someone from Admiralty and demanded Dr. Bridge to go there because she had a hutch that she have someone there. Following her trip, she finds Samuel, an officer who invites her to a restaurant. It turns out to be a person she truly loved when they along with his brother Phillip, immigrated to Camiers before the war happened there in 1915. Following long court proceedings which started in February 1917, despite being diagnosed with shell shock, she wins custody over her adult children Clara and Nicholas only by 1930.

== Reception ==
The book received mixed reviews, with The Harvard Crimson saying "Shreve cannot control dialogue rhythm and the reader's visualization of the scene without relying on punctuation to do her work," hinting on the author's weak parts of the story. USA Today, on the other hand, gave it three stars, saying that "If there is a fault in the author's writing then its only the fact that she made it more to be a love story rather than a war one". Jim Higgins of the Milwaukee Journal Sentinel said that the book was reminiscent of Pat Barker's Regeneration.

It was also reviewed by such newspapers as the Los Angeles Times, San Francisco Chronicle, the Boston Globe, the Washington Post, and Toronto Star.
