= City Theater (Biddeford, Maine) =

- U.S. National Register of Historic Places
- U.S. Historic district – Contributing property
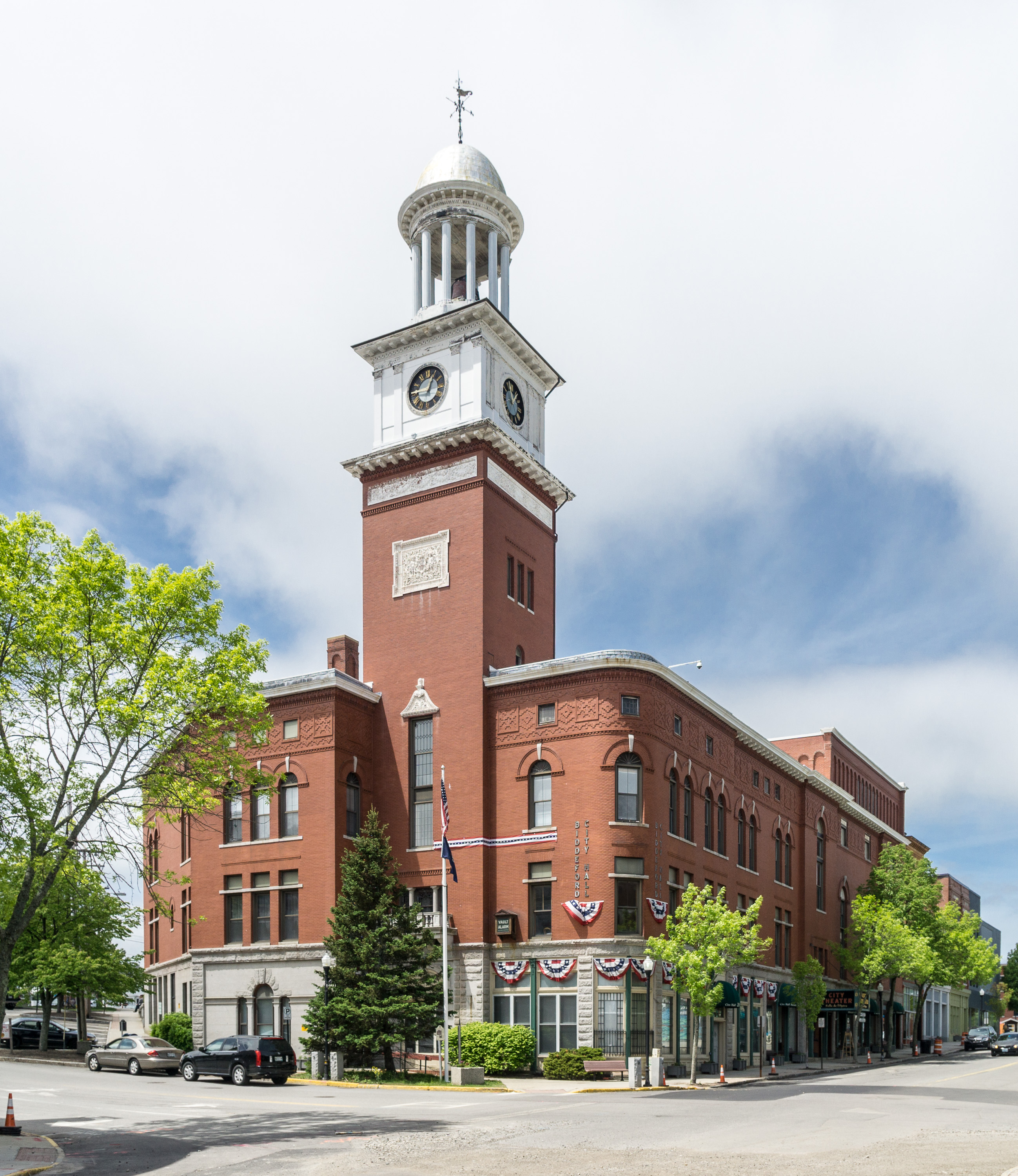
- City Hall complex containing the theater

- Location within Maine Location within the United States
- Location: 205 Main St., Biddeford, Maine
- Coordinates: 43°29′36″N 70°27′26″W
- Area: less than one acre
- Built: 1895
- Architect: John Calvin Stevens
- Part of: Biddeford Main Street Historic District (ID09001146)
- NRHP reference No.: 73000156

Significant dates
- Added to NRHP: April 24, 1973
- Designated CP: December 24, 2009

Biddeford City Theater is a year-round near 500-seat, restored Victorian opera house at 205 Main Street in Biddeford, Maine, United States. Biddeford City Theater is a non-profit, volunteer-driven, organization that produces and hosts plays, musicals, concerts, movies, music, comedy, and other artistic performances with patrons from all over New England. The mission of City Theater Associates is to foster an appreciation for the performing arts by using creative avenues to increase community involvement.

City Theater is part of the Biddeford City Hall complex, designed by Maine architect John Calvin Stevens in 1895. The building is included on the National Register of Historic Places, and is a contributing element to the Biddeford Main Street Historic District.

== Theater History ==
In the late 1840s, the City of Biddeford purchased a parcel of land at the corner of Adams and Main Streets, and at that site planned a building to house the city's municipal offices, as well as the original opera house. The opera house opened in October 1860 with a play depicting slavery in the Southern states – appropriately on the eve of the Civil War. With those first performances, an era of theatrical history began for the city of Biddeford. Renowned thespians Edwin Booth, Joseph Jefferson, and Pat Rooney appeared over the years before appreciative audiences.

On December 30, 1894, a raging fire destroyed the entire city building. An emergency city council meeting was called for on January 2, 1895. From that initial session, until the final architectural designs were completed, the question of whether or not to rebuild the opera house was hotly debated. Eventually, the dispute over building a performance arts center was settled in favor of the arts, and the planning for a larger and more structurally sound facility was initiated. John Calvin Stevens, the world-famous Maine architect, designed a richly ornamented opera house in the colonial revival style, complete with a dramatic horseshoe balcony. A large, ornate brass chandelier with glass shades showcased the stenciled ceilings. The rebuilt opera house reopened on January 20, 1896, and quickly resumed its role as a cultural focal point in York County.

A favorite among audiences was Vaudeville, with Biddeford as an important stop on its circuit. Dramatic performances by such stage immortals as the Barrymores, along with minstrel shows, community pageants, and plays were among the Theater's popular offerings. J. J. Salvas, a local theatrical director and actor of note, regularly entertained capacity crowds with his portrayal of various characters. (photo shows J. J. Salvas in costume for his role as Tonkoutou.) Illustrated songs were also enjoyed by enthusiastic audiences.

However, one such performance ended tragically and remains a part of City Theater's folklore. On Halloween Eve, 1904 singer Eva Gray collapsed after her third encore of the song Goodbye, Little Girl, Goodbye. With her 3-year-old daughter present, the beautiful 33-year-old died backstage from heart failure. Many since have referred to Eva as the Theater's resident “ghost”.

Soon, films began to gain popularity, and when talkies were introduced in 1928, live theater was nearly eclipsed. The opera house became a movie house in the 1930s. After that, those grand days of vaudeville were over, except for the occasional appearance of an act between films.

Renamed City Theater in 1955, interior improvements were started. The lobby and its staircase were paneled, new poster display cases were built, along with a projection booth, and a permanent cinemascope screen was put in place.

The transition from opera house to movie theater was neither easy nor graceful. Television and drive-ins won the battle over movie houses, and in 1965 City Theater closed its doors. From 1971 to 1974 it was actually used as a storage facility for the city. Ironically, in 1973 City Theater, as part of Biddeford City Hall, was recognized and listed as a Historical Landmark with the National Trust.

Regardless, in 1975 a load of sand was dumped in the middle of the venerable old facility, turning the orchestra pit into a horseshoe pit.

However, not everyone thought the Theater should suffer this fate. In 1977, the newly incorporated City Theater Associates began a move to reopen City Theater. Through a lot of hard work and community volunteerism, the Theater reopened in 1978 with the internationally acclaimed Norman Luboff Choir. The Theater received a face lift, but was still in dire need of many essential upgrades and comprehensive restoration.

The public supported the City Theater and attendance grew as plays, musicals, concerts, dance recitals and community events once again graced the stage.

In 1996 the Theater celebrated its 100th anniversary and was awarded a gift of new seats from the city of Biddeford. Soon a combination of funding received from federal, state, municipal, private, and business sources put restoration efforts into full motion. The highlights of this effort include a new marquee along with restored and reproduced stenciling on the Theater's lobby walls, house walls, and ceiling. The Theater also received modern updates to its lighting and sound system, a digital projector and the installation of a new heating and air conditioning system. Old buildings demand constant maintenance and the upgrades continue. Today, efforts are under way to make upgrades to stage flooring, the costume room and public restrooms, as well as to re-point exterior brickwork, and to make long- overdue upgrades to the fly system (most of the pulleys and the pin rail above the stage are original equipment).

City Theater continues its mission of fostering an appreciation for the performing arts. In addition to five main stage productions, it has expanded its season by collaborating with other non-profits and entertainment organizations to bring music, comedy and dance to the City Theater stage.

== Present Day ==
Biddeford City Theater currently runs a year-round season of theater, music, comedy, and other artistic performances.

== See also ==
- National Register of Historic Places listings in York County, Maine
