= GWI.net =

Logo of GWI.net

GWI (Great Works Internet) is a privately held telecommunications company providing internet and phone services for residential and business customers in Maine. The company was established in 1994 and is headquartered in Biddeford, Maine.

== History ==
Originally known as Biddeford Internet Corporation, the company was set up to serve the Greater Biddeford, Maine area as a local Internet service provider. Within one year, the Corporation had expanded to serve 70 percent of the Maine population with dial-up service. In 1996, the Biddeford Internet Corporation partnered with Casco Cable and New England Cable Vision and became one of the first ISP's in the United States to provide technical support to the cable industry. The Corporation also offered wholesale Domain Name System (DNS), domain name hosting, and technical support direct to its cable customers.

In 1997, Biddeford Internet Corporation completed statewide network access in Maine and changed its name to Great Works Internet, in honor of the Great Works River - a 27-mile-long (43 km) river in Southwestern Maine. The name was later shortened to GWI.

In 2002, GWI introduced GWI Broadband, an ADSL based High Speed Internet service, rolling the service out to 50 communities in Maine and New Hampshire within one year.

In 2003 and 2004, Inc. Magazine recognized GWI as one of the country’s 500 fastest growing companies. GWI was again recognized by Inc.com in 2010 and 2011 as one of the 5000 fastest growing private companies in the USA.

The company added residential phone service in 2005 and commercial phone service in 2007.

In 2011, GWI CEO Fletcher Kittredge was named large company Business Leader of the Year by MaineBiz, a business news magazine.
