= Fortunes Rocks, Maine =

Coordinates: 43°25′35″N 70°23′0″W

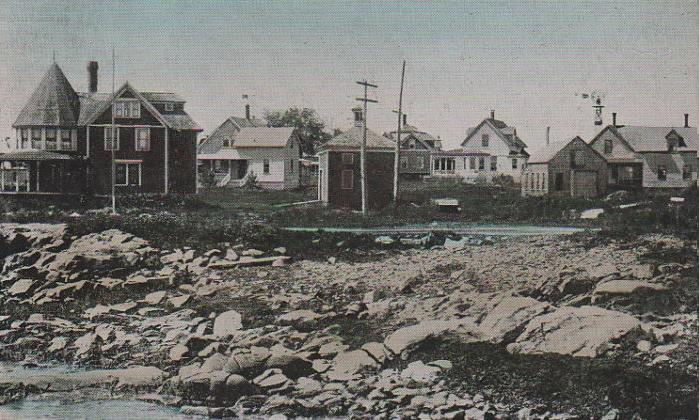
General view in 1916

Fortunes Rocks is a seaside community in Biddeford, York County, Maine, located approximately 85 miles (140 km) north of Boston, Massachusetts. The 1999 novel Fortune's Rocks by Anita Shreve is loosely based on this Maine seaside neighborhood.
