= Fort Mary (Maine) =

Coordinates: 43.4479°N 70.3571°W

Fort Mary was a British fort built in 1688 that saw action during Queen Anne's War and was located in Saco, Maine overlooking Winter Harbor / Biddeford Pool. Saco was raided in 1704 and 1705.
