= Kermess =

- Origin: Coaticook, Quebec, Canada
- Genres: Rock
- Years active: 1995–2004
- Labels: independent
- Past members: Martin Fillion; François Landry; Mario Landry; Dominic Morin; Sylvain Tremblay

Kermess was a melodic rock band from Quebec, Canada.

== History ==
Kermess was founded in 1995. In 1996, they won the Cégeps Rock contest. Their first album, Les douze nocturnes was released the next year, and 10,000 copies were sold.

In 1998, the band released the album Bref exposé.

In 2002, the band released its third album, played at several festivals and performed at a number of colleges in Quebec.

The group disbanded in 2004.

Twelve years later, the band regrouped to perform at the Fête du lac des Nations in Sherbrooke.

== Discography ==
- 1997: Les douze nocturnes
- 1998: Bref exposé
- 2002: Génération Atari

== Members ==
- Martin Fillion (vocals, drums) (taught a grade 7 class at Franklin Street Public school in Markham, Ontario, Canada, in 2002–2003)
- François Landry (vocals, guitar)
- Mario Landry (bass)
- Dominic Morin (vocals, guitar)
- Sylvain Tremblay (vocals, guitar)
