= Anita Shreve =

American writer

- Born: Anita Hale Shreve; October 7, 1946; Boston, Massachusetts, U.S.
- Died: March 29, 2018 (aged 71); Newfields, New Hampshire, U.S.
- Occupations: Writer, novelist
- Spouses: Jack Christensen (divorced) Clay Wescott (m. 1973; div. 1978) John Clemans (m. 1978; div. 1991) John Osborn (m. 1999)
- Children: 2
- Writing career
- Period: 1975–2018
- Genres: Fiction, non-fiction

Anita Hale Shreve (October 7, 1946 – March 29, 2018) was an American writer, chiefly known for her novels. One of her first published stories, Past the Island, Drifting (published 1975), was awarded an O. Henry Prize in 1976.

== Early years and education ==
Born in Boston, the eldest of three daughters, Shreve grew up in Dedham, Massachusetts. She was a member of the Dedham High School class of 1964.

Her father, Richard Harold Shreve, was an airline pilot for Delta Air Lines and later a trompe l'oeil painter, while her mother, Bibiana Kennedy, was a homemaker.

Shreve graduated from Tufts University and was a member of Chi Omega.

== Personal life ==
She married Jack Christensen, her first husband, while he finished his medical degree at Harvard Medical School. She met her second husband, Clay Wescott, at Reading Memorial High School, where they were teachers. Shreve and Wescott were living in Hingham, Massachusetts, and taking part in a Wescott family project to build Alcyone, a 41-foot sailboat, which was launched in January 1973. Some of Shreve's voyages with Wescott in Alcyone became fictionalized in her later writing. Wescott and Shreve married in 1975, and went to Kenya together, where Wescott got a job with the Harvard Institute for International Development while finishing his PhD. In 1978, Wescott and Shreve split up and returned to the USA.

In 1980, she married again, this time to John Clemans, a photographer she met at Viva Magazine, in Nairobi, and with whom she had two children, Christopher and Katherine. She was married for a fourth time, in 1999, to John Osborn, an insurance broker, and remained with him until her death.

== Career ==
Shreve taught at Reading Memorial High School before shifting to Hingham High School. Shreve wanted to become a writer, but it wasn't easy. Wescott and Shreve had a wall of their apartment covered with all the rejection notices she received. While in Kenya, Shreve worked as Deputy Editor for Viva Magazine, an award-winning Kenyan publication under the direction of Salim Lone. Some of Shreve's Kenyan adventures also ended up in her books. One book, A Change in Altitude, was a fictional account about a climb to the top of Mount Kenya that Wescott and Shreve did with their friends Mary and Richard Oates. In the real story, they were near the top of the mountain, and Mary slipped on the ice, but the guide caught her before she fell off the edge. In Shreve's version, Mary fell off the edge and died. Shreve was a cheerful person, but her stories were often tragic.

She continued to work as a freelance journalist. In 1999, while she was teaching Creative Writing at Amherst College, Oprah Winfrey called, selecting The Pilot's Wife for her book club. Since then, Shreve's novels have sold millions of copies worldwide.

In 2000, her novel The Weight of Water was made into a movie of the same title, directed by Kathryn Bigelow and starring Sean Penn, Sarah Polley, and Elizabeth Hurley. Two years later, her novel Resistance became a film of the same name and starred Bill Paxton and Julia Ormond. That same year, CBS released The Pilot's Wife as a movie of the week starring Christine Lahti and John Heard.

== Death and legacy ==
Anita Shreve died on March 29, 2018, aged 71, at her home at Newfields, New Hampshire, from cancer. Her widower, John Osborn, donated a collection of her books to Dedham High School. The books were given at a special ceremony attended by Osborn and several of her classmates. The books are displayed in a special case in the library with a commemorative plaque.

== Awards and honors ==
- 2000: Short-listed for the Orange Prize, The Weight of Water
- 1999: Oprah Winfrey's Book Club, The Pilot's Wife
- 1998: L.L. Winship/PEN New England Award, The Weight of Water
- 1976: O. Henry Prize, Past the Island, Drifting

== Bibliography ==
=== Fiction ===
- Past the Island, Drifting (1975)
- Eden Close (1989)
- Strange Fits of Passion (1991)
- Where or When (1993)
- Resistance (1995)
- The Weight of Water (1997) (Shortlisted for the 1998 Orange Prize)
- The Pilot's Wife (1998)
- Fortune's Rocks (1999)
- The Last Time They Met (2001)
- Sea Glass (2002)
- All He Ever Wanted (2003)
- Light on Snow (2004)
- A Wedding in December (2005)
- Body Surfing (2007)
- Testimony (2008)
- A Change in Altitude (2009)
- Rescue (2010)
- Stella Bain (2013)
- The Stars Are Fire (2017)

=== Nonfiction ===
- Remaking Motherhood: How Working Mothers are Shaping Our Children's Future (1987)
- Women Together, Women Alone: The Legacy of the Consciousness-Raising Movement (1989)
