= Alkermes =

Alkermes may refer to:

- Alkermes (company), a biopharmaceutical company
- Alchermes, a red liqueur coloured by inclusion of the insect Kermes vermilio

== See also ==
- Kermes (disambiguation)
