= La Kermesse Franco-Americaine Festival =

French Canadian Cultural Festival in Biddeford, Maine

Coordinates: 43.47975°N 70.4649572°W

La Kermesse Franco Americaine Festival
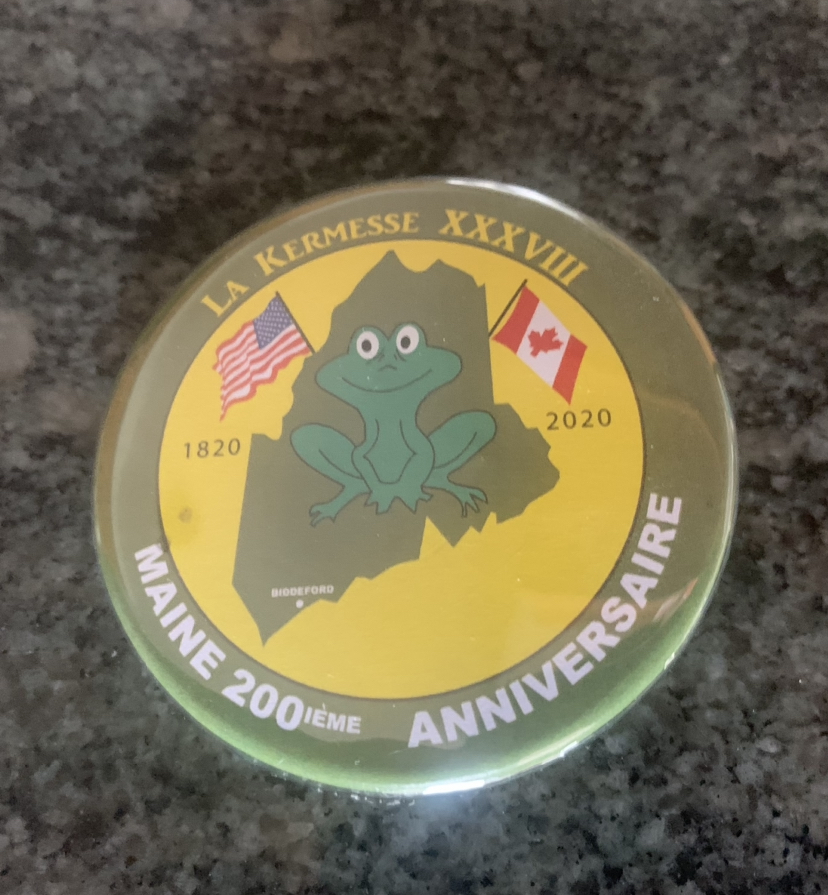
- La Kermesse Festival Bicentennial Pin-Back Button
- Venue: Saint Louis Field
- Location: Biddeford, Maine
- Organized by: La Kermesse Festival Board of Directors
- Website: www.lakermessefestival.com

The La Kermesse Franco-Americaine Festival (French: La Kermesse Franco-Americaine Festival, lit. 'The Franco-American Kermesse Festival') is a festival in Biddeford, Maine, which celebrates the state's French and French Canadian heritage. It is colloquially shortened to 'La Kermesse' (French: La Kermesse, lit. 'The Fair'). La Kermesse began in 1982 with the motto "C'est Le Temps" (French: C'est Le Temps, lit. 'It is the time').

Festival is held in Biddeford, which is located in Southern Maine.

== History ==
Established in 1982, La Kermesse has been a celebration of French Canadian culture in Maine with live music, games and entertainment. In 1997, the Festival shifted to include all groups in the city. Throughout its history the festival has used a green frog as its mascot and pin-back buttons to confirm entry. These buttons get changed every year and so people collect and trade them. Fireworks are also a prominent feature of the festival. After being postponed by COVID-19 in 2020, La Kermesse returned in 2022.

== Struggles ==
In 2009 and 2010, the Festival faced significant financial difficulties and nearly shut down. After the festival survived these difficult times, the COVID-19 pandemic caused the festival to be postponed in 2020 and 2021.
