= Biddeford, Maine =

City in Maine, United States

- City
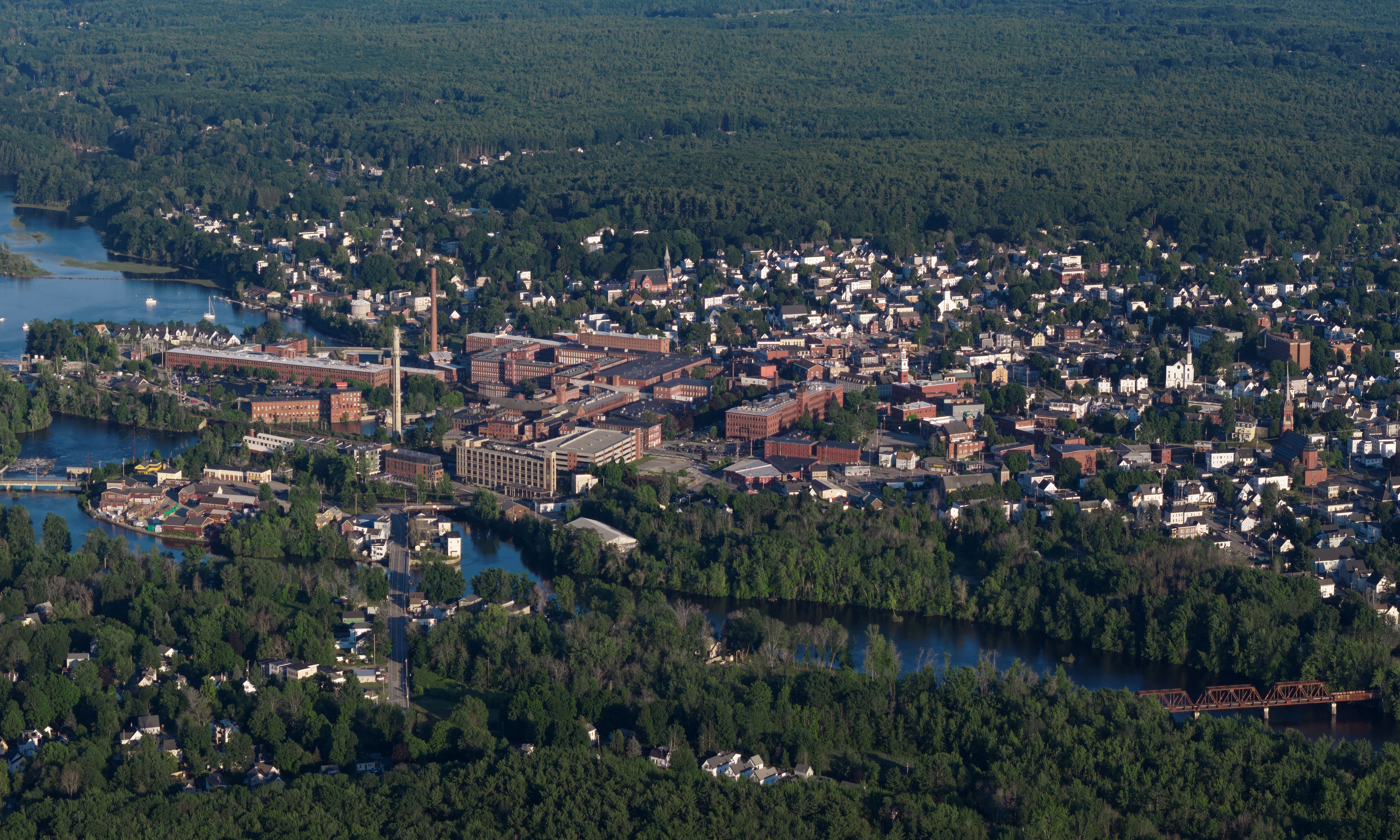
- Downtown (2026)

- Seal
- Nickname: Twin City
- Motto: "A Proud City Rising Where the Water Falls"
- Location within Maine Location within the United States
- Coordinates: 43°28′27″N 70°26′46″W
- Country: United States
- State: Maine
- County: York
- First Landing: 1616
- Settled: 1631
- Incorporated (town): July 5, 1653
- Incorporated (city): February 10, 1855

Area
  - Total: 59.08 sq mi (153.02 km^{2})
  - Land: 30.09 sq mi (77.92 km^{2})
  - Water: 29.00 sq mi (75.10 km^{2})
- Elevation: 56 ft (17 m)

Population (2020)
  - Total: 22,552
  - Density: 749.6/sq mi (289.42/km^{2})
- Time zone: UTC−5 (EST)
  - Summer (DST): UTC−4 (EDT)
- ZIP Codes: 04005, 04007 (Biddeford); 04006 (Biddeford Pool)
- Area code: 207
- FIPS code: 23-04860
- GNIS feature ID: 582353
- Website: www.biddefordmaine.org

Biddeford (/ˈbɪdɪfərd/ BID-if-ərd) is a city in York County, Maine, United States. It is the principal commercial center of York County. Its population was 22,552 at the 2020 census. The twin cities of Saco and Biddeford include the resort communities of Biddeford Pool and Fortunes Rocks. The town is the site of the University of New England and the annual La Kermesse Franco-Americaine Festival. First visited by Europeans in 1616, it is the site of one of the earliest European settlements in the United States. It is home to Saint Joseph's Church, the tallest building in Maine.

Biddeford is a principal population center of the Portland-South Portland-Biddeford metropolitan statistical area.

== History ==
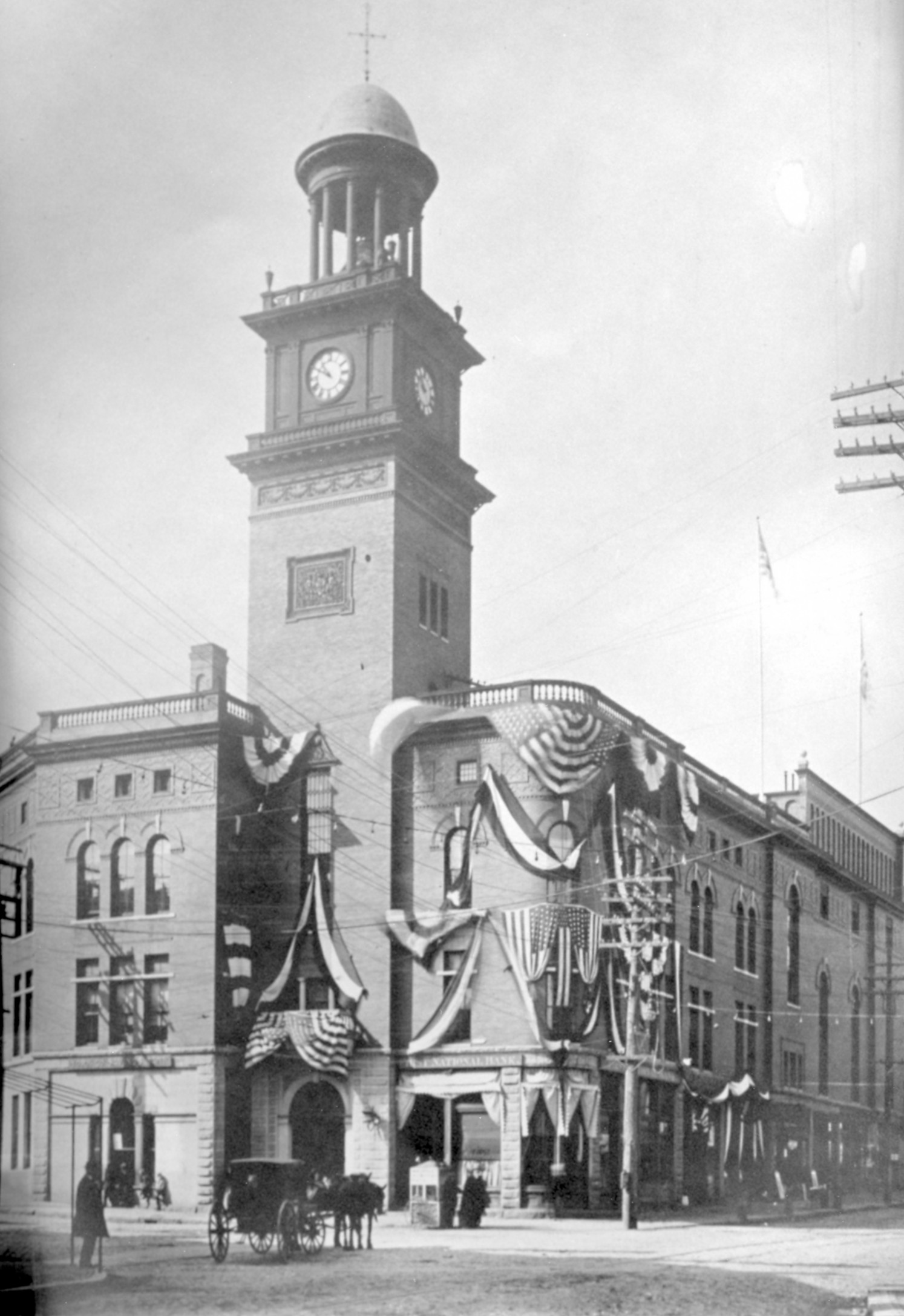
Town hall c. 1885

The first European to settle at Biddeford was physician Richard Vines in the winter of 1616–17 at Winter Harbor, as he called Biddeford Pool. This 1616 landing by a European antedates the Mayflower landing in Plymouth, Massachusetts (100 miles to the south), by about four years, a fact much of New England lore overlooks. In 1630, the Plymouth Company granted the land south of the River Swanckadocke to Vines and John Oldham. In 1653, the town included both sides of the river, and was incorporated by the Massachusetts General Court as Saco.

Biddeford was first incorporated as the Town of Saco in 1653. Roger Spencer was granted the right in 1653 to build the first sawmill. Lumber and fish became the community's chief exports. In 1659, Major William Phillips of Boston became a proprietor, and constructed a garrison and watermill at the falls. Settlers withdrew to Winter Harbor for safety, and their homes and mills upriver at the falls were burned. In 1693, a stone fort was built a short distance below the falls, but it was allegedly captured by Native Americans in 1703, when 11 colonists were killed and 24 taken captive to Canada. In 1688, Fort Mary was built near the entrance to Biddeford Pool. The town was reorganized in 1718 as Biddeford, after Bideford, a town in Devon, England, from which some settlers had emigrated. After the Fall of Quebec in 1759, hostilities with the indigenous people ceased. During King Philip's War in 1675, the town, once again, was allegedly attacked by Native Americans.

In 1762, the land northeast of the river was set off as Pepperellborough, which in 1805 was renamed Saco. The first bridge to Saco was built in 1767. The river divides into two falls that drop 40 feet (12 m), providing water power for mills. Factories were established to make boots and shoes. The developing mill town also had granite quarries and brickyards, in addition to lumber and grain mills. Major textile manufacturing facilities were constructed along the riverbanks, including the Laconia Company in 1845, and the Pepperell Company in 1850. Biddeford was incorporated as a city in 1855.

The mills attracted waves of immigrants, including Irish, Albanians, and French-Canadians from Quebec. At one time, the textile mills employed as many as 12,000 people, but as happened elsewhere, the industry entered a long period of decline. As of 2009, the last remaining textile company in the city, WestPoint Home, closed. The property occupying the mill has been sold and is being redeveloped into housing and new businesses. The last log drive down the Saco River was in 1943, with the last log sawn in 1948. Biddeford's name is engraved near the top level of the Pilgrim Monument, in Provincetown, Massachusetts, along with the names of some of the oldest cities and towns in New England.

During World War II, the Biddeford Pool Military Reservation was established from 1942 to 1945, on what is now the Abenakee Golf Club. It had four circular concrete platforms called "Panama mounts" for 155-mm guns, three of which remain today.

On July 13, 2026, a United States Immigration and Customs Enforcement agent fatally shot Johan Sebastián Durán Guerrero, a 25-year old Colombian national, in Biddeford.

== Geography ==
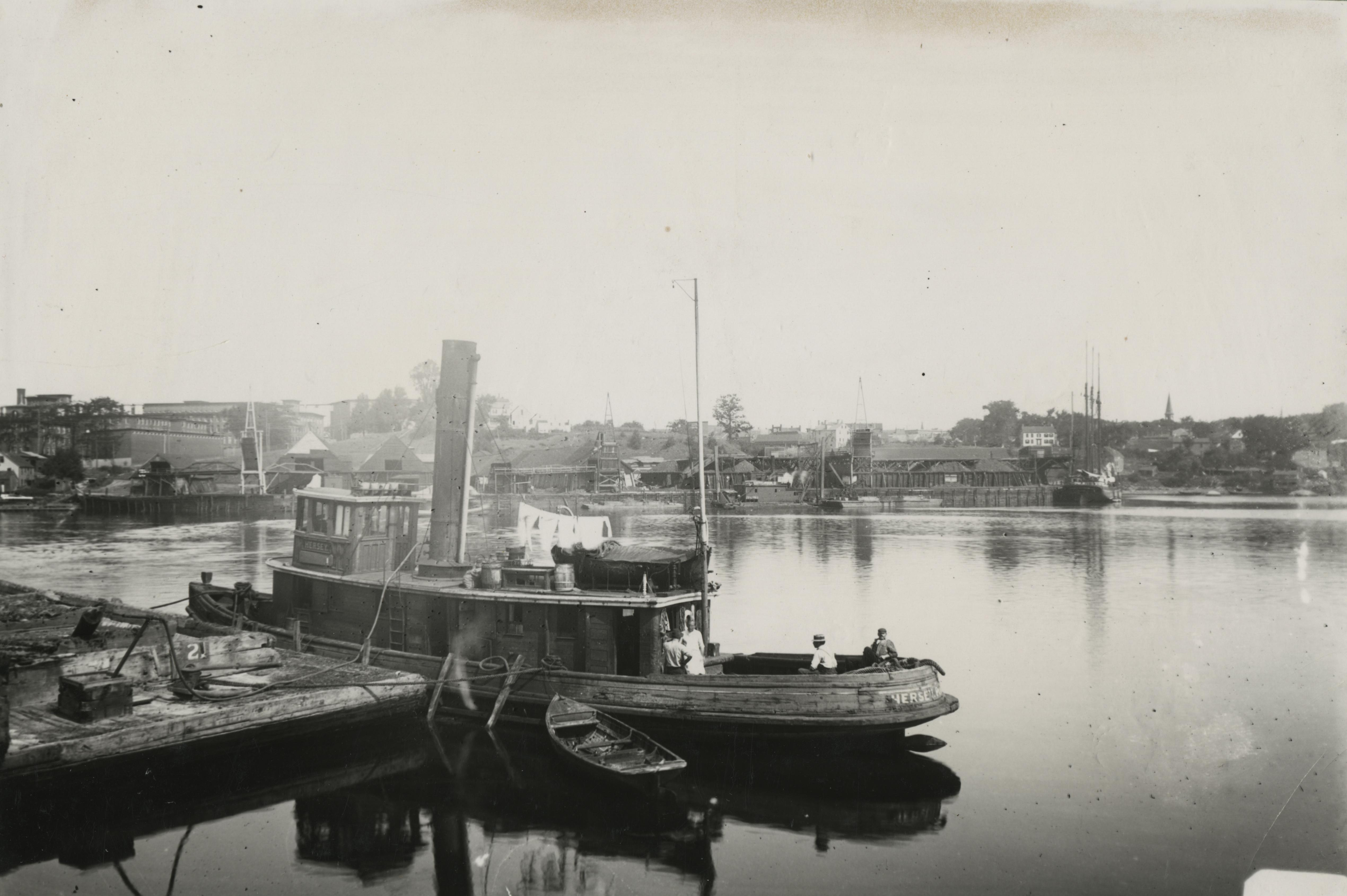
Tugboat Hersey tied up at Bragdon's Wharf, Biddeford, 1912

According to the United States Census Bureau, the city has an area of 59.08 square miles (153.02 km^{2}), of which 28.99 square miles (75.08 km^{2}) are covered by water. Situated beside Saco Bay on the Gulf of Maine, Biddeford is drained by the Little River and the Saco River. The city proper has very diverse geography, from inland rolling hillside, to urban settlement, to coastal sprawl.

The city is crossed by Interstate 95, U. S. Route 1, and state routes 5, 9, 111, and 208. It is bordered by the city of Saco to the north, the Atlantic Ocean to the east, the towns of Dayton and Lyman to the west, and the towns of Kennebunkport and Arundel to the south. The Little River forms a portion of the border between Biddeford and the Goose Rocks neighborhood of Kennebunkport, in Biddeford's most southerly region (Granite Point). East Point, located on the peninsula of Biddeford Pool, is the easternmost point in York County.

Timber Island, the most southerly point in the City of Biddeford, lies in Goosefare Bay at the mouth of the Little River, and is accessible at low tide from Goose Rocks Beach in Kennebunkport. The island and most of adjacent Timber Point became part of the Rachel Carson National Wildlife Refuge in December 2011.

The city has almost 15 miles (24 km) of frontage along the Saco River, and an Atlantic coastline on which the seaside neighborhoods of Hills Beach, Biddeford Pool, Fortunes Rocks and Granite Point are located. Biddeford includes Wood Island Light, a lighthouse located about a mile offshore from Biddeford Pool.

=== Climate ===
This climatic region is typified by large seasonal temperature differences, with warm to hot (and often humid) summers and cold (sometimes severely cold) winters. According to the Köppen climate classification, Biddeford has a humid continental climate, Dfb on climate maps.

== Demographics ==
Historical population
Census	Pop.	Note	%±
1790	1,018		—
1800	1,296		27.3%
1810	1,563		20.6%
1820	1,738		11.2%
1830	1,995		14.8%
1840	2,574		29.0%
1850	6,095		136.8%
1860	9,349		53.4%
1870	10,282		10.0%
1880	12,651		23.0%
1890	14,443		14.2%
1900	16,145		11.8%
1910	17,079		5.8%
1920	18,008		5.4%
1930	17,633		−2.1%
1940	19,790		12.2%
1950	20,836		5.3%
1960	19,255		−7.6%
1970	19,983		3.8%
1980	19,638		−1.7%
1990	20,710		5.5%
2000	20,942		1.1%
2010	21,277		1.6%
2020	22,552		6.0%
2025 (est.)	22,399		−0.7%

=== 2020 census ===
As of the 2020 census, Biddeford had a population of 22,552. The median age was 38.2 years. 15.9% of residents were under the age of 18 and 18.3% of residents were 65 years of age or older. For every 100 females there were 90.9 males, and for every 100 females age 18 and over there were 88.2 males age 18 and over.

86.3% of residents lived in urban areas, while 13.7% lived in rural areas.

There were 9,507 households in Biddeford, of which 21.4% had children under the age of 18 living in them. Of all households, 36.6% were married-couple households, 22.6% were households with a male householder and no spouse or partner present, and 28.8% were households with a female householder and no spouse or partner present. About 34.1% of all households were made up of individuals and 12.3% had someone living alone who was 65 years of age or older.

There were 10,686 housing units, of which 11.0% were vacant. The homeowner vacancy rate was 1.1% and the rental vacancy rate was 4.7%.

Racial composition as of the 2020 census
Race	Number	Percent
White	20,073	89.0%
Black or African American	595	2.6%
American Indian and Alaska Native	127	0.6%
Asian	459	2.0%
Native Hawaiian and Other Pacific Islander	7	0.0%
Some other race	230	1.0%
Two or more races	1,061	4.7%
Hispanic or Latino (of any race)	588	2.6%

=== 2010 census ===
At the 2010 census, there were 21,277 people, 8,598 households and 4,972 families residing in the city. The population density was 707.1 inhabitants per square mile (273.0/km^{2}). There were 10,064 housing units at an average density of 334.5 per square mile (129.2/km^{2}). The racial makeup of the city was 94.8% White, 1.0% African American, 0.5% Native American, 1.7% Asian, 0.4% from other races, and 1.6% from two or more races. Hispanic or Latino of any race were 1.7% of the population.

There were 8,598 households, of which 27.3% had children under the age of 18 living with them, 40.4% were married couples living together, 12.3% had a female householder with no husband present, 5.1% had a male householder with no wife present, and 42.2% were non-families. 30.0% of all households were made up of individuals, and 11.1% had someone living alone who was 65 years of age or older. The average household size was 2.30 and the average family size was 2.84.

The median age in the city was 38.3 years. 18.7% of residents were under the age of 18; 15.4% were between the ages of 18 and 24; 24.3% were from 25 to 44; 26.1% were from 45 to 64; and 15.3% were 65 years of age or older. The gender makeup of the city was 47.5% male and 52.5% female.

=== 2000 census ===
At the 2000 census, there were 20,942 people, 8,636 households and 5,259 families residing in the city. The population density was 697.8 inhabitants per square mile (269.4/km^{2}). There were 9,631 housing units at an average density of 320.9 per square mile (123.9/km^{2}). The racial makeup of the city was 96.65 percent White, 0.64 percent African American, 0.40 percent Native American, 0.99 percent Asian, 0.03 percent Pacific Islander, 0.18 percent from other races, and 1.12 percent from two or more races. Hispanic or Latino of any race were 0.65 percent of the population.

There were 7,636 households, of which 28.4 percent had children under the age of 18 living with them, 44.4 percent were married couples living together, 12.2 percent had a female householder with no husband present, and 39.1 percent were non-families. 29.7 percent of all households were made up of individuals, and 11.1 percent had someone living alone who was 65 years of age or older. The average household size was 2.32 and the average family size was 2.88.

22.1 percent of the population were under the age of 18, 11.1 percent from 18 to 24, 29.5 percent from 25 to 44, 21.8 percent from 45 to 64, and 15.5 percent who were 65 years of age or older. The median age was 36 years. For every 100 females, there were 88.2 males. For every 100 females age 18 and over, there were 84.4 males.

The median household income was $37,164 and the median family income was $44,109. Males had a median income of $32,008 versus $24,715 for females. The per capita income for the city was $18,214. About 8.6 percent of families and 13.8 percent of the population were below the poverty line, including 19.8 percent of those under age 18 and 10.3 percent of those age 65 or over.

== Economy ==
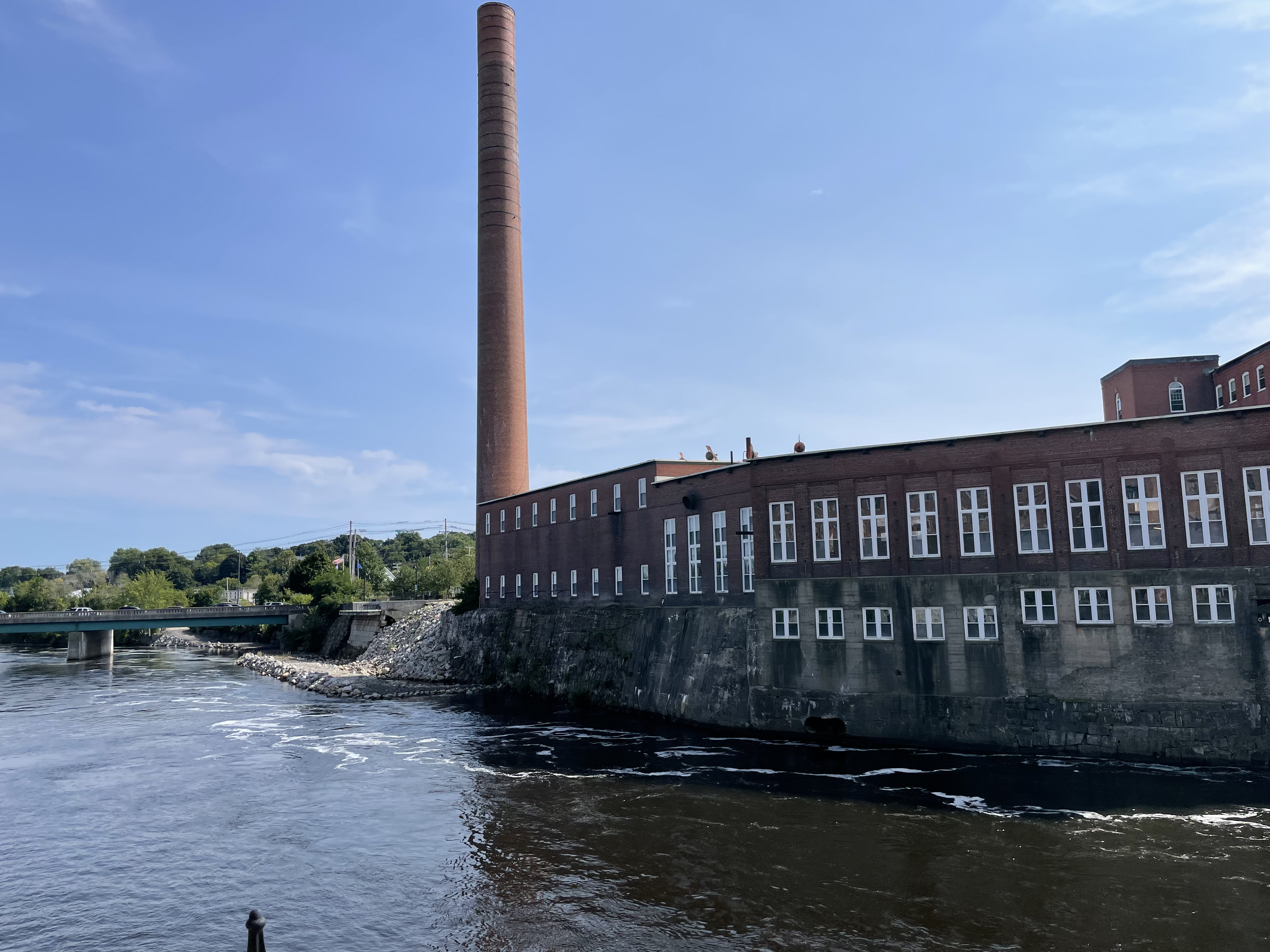
The old mills of Biddeford

Biddeford is one of Maine's fastest-growing commercial centers, due to its close proximity to the Seacoast Region of New Hampshire and to northern Massachusetts. In recent years, strip malls have developed along the State Route 111 corridor. In late 2006, a 500,000-square-foot (46,000 m^{2}) shopping center known as The Shops at Biddeford Crossing opened, with 20 stores and five restaurants.

Recent interest in revitalizing the downtown area has brought new life to the old mills. The North Dam Mill is one example of this movement offering retail stores, art studios, cultural events, and upscale housing.

Biddeford is home to large institutions including MaineHealth Maine Medical Center Biddeford and the University of New England, a fast-growing school located along the coast which includes Maine's only medical school, the University of New England College of Osteopathic Medicine. Telecommunications company GWI.net is headquartered in the city. The city also possesses a wide array of community facilities including public beaches, an ice arena, a full-service YMCA, and one school which has been recently recognized as a National School of Excellence.

== Arts and culture ==
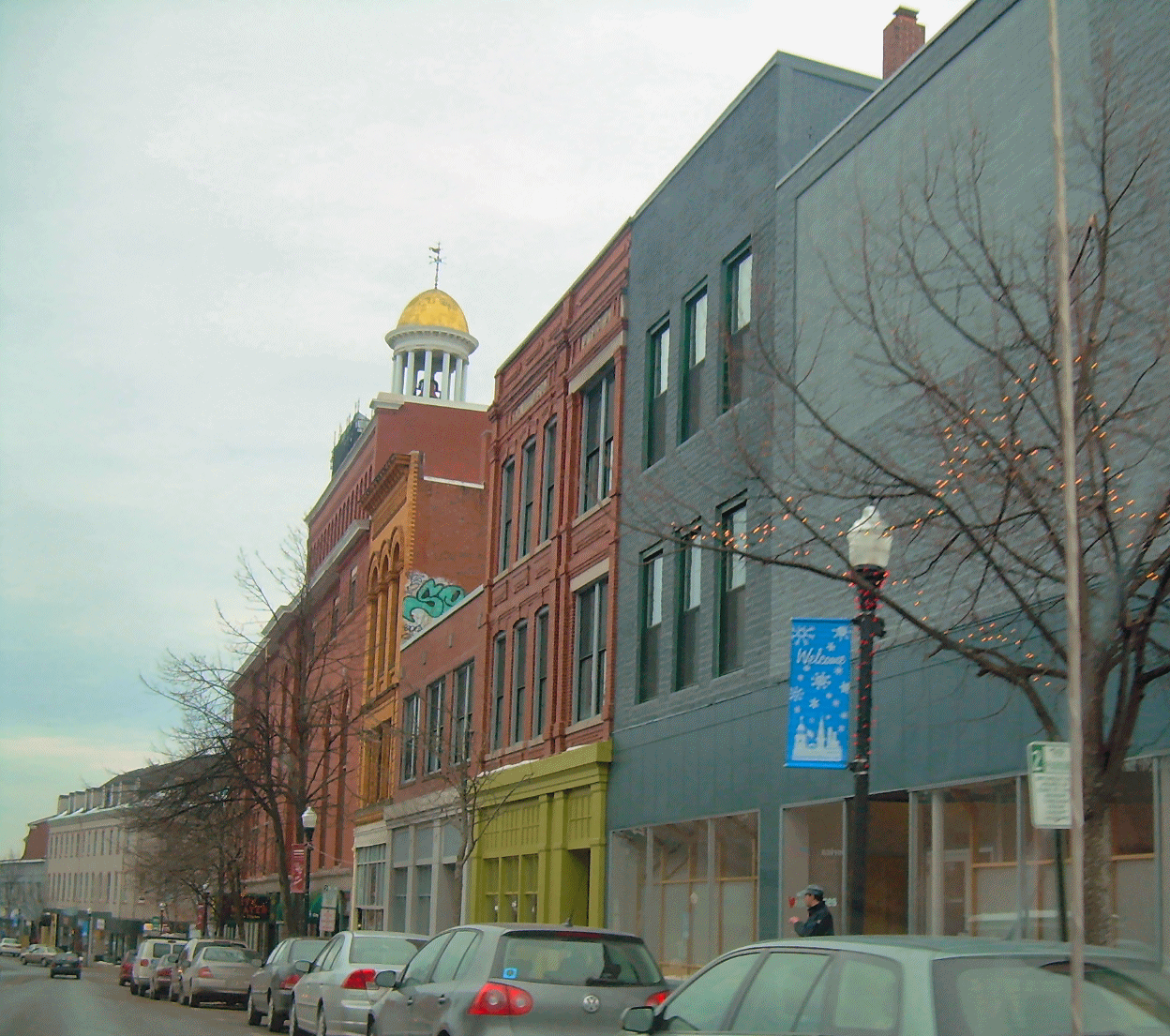
Main Street

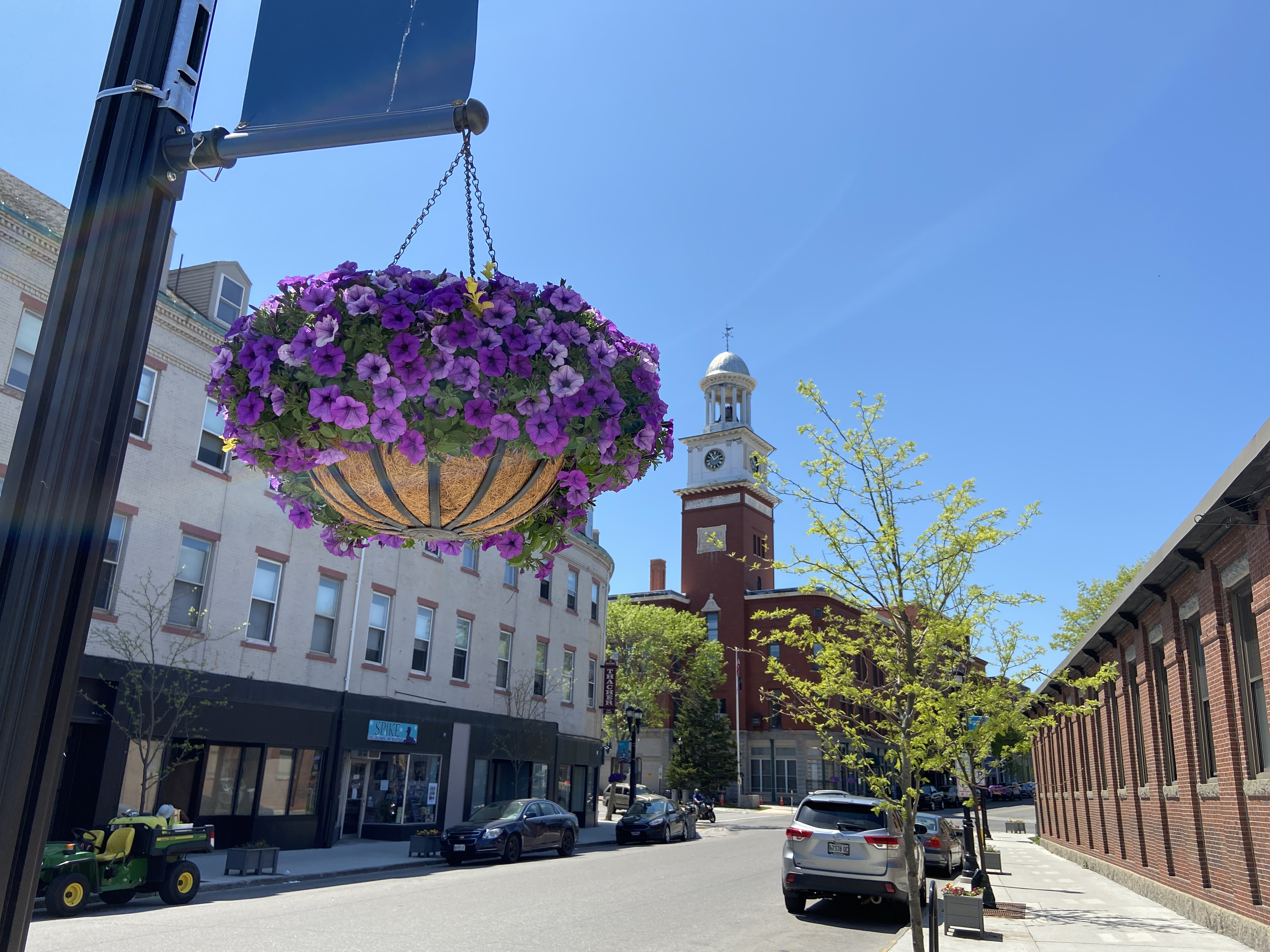
City Hall

=== Tourism ===
Anchoring Biddeford's historic downtown are McArthur Public Library and Biddeford's City Theater. Biddeford has a number of properties and two Historic Districts entered into the National Register of Historic Places. The newest addition is the Main Street Historic District, entered into the National Register on December 24, 2009. Other downtown National Register properties include the Biddeford-Saco Mills Historic District, Biddeford City Hall, Dudley Block and the U.S. Post Office. National Register properties outside of downtown and in the Biddeford Pool area include the John Tarr House, First Parish Meetinghouse, Fletcher's Neck Lifesaving Station and the James Montgomery Flagg House. There are also many festivals and concerts held around the city.

=== Sites of interest ===
- Biddeford Historical Society
- First Parish Meetinghouse
- McArthur Public Library
- Franco-American Genealogical Society of York County
- City Theater for the Performing Arts
- Biddeford Cultural and Heritage Center
- Biddeford History and Heritage Project//Maine Memory Network
- Biddeford Mills Museum

== Infrastructure ==
=== Transportation ===
Biddeford was the eastern terminus of the now-defunct New England Interstate Route 11, which ended in Manchester, Vermont. State Route 111, which travels through Biddeford's main commercial corridor, is now numbered in Old Route 11's place. Biddeford Municipal Airport is located two miles south of the central business district. The Saco Transportation Center Amtrak stop serves downtown Biddeford.

Local bus service in Biddeford is provided by Biddeford-Saco-Old Orchard Beach Transit, connecting the city to destinations in Saco and Portland.

== Education ==
It is in the Biddeford School District. Schools include the Biddeford High School and the Biddeford Regional Center of Technology.

== Notable people ==
- Cajetan J. B. Baumann O.F.B., AIA, (1899–1969), member of the American Institute of Architects
- Robert Caret, current Chancellor Emeritus of The University System of Maryland
- Roger Cook, landscape contractor and television personality
- Ovid Demaris, author
- Susan Deschambault, State Senator
- Brian Dumoulin, NHL Hockey Player
- Ryan Fecteau, State Representative, Speaker of the Maine House of Representatives
- R.A.P. Ferreira, American rapper and producer
- John R. French, U.S. Congressman
- Rachel Griffin-Accurso, better known as Ms. Rachel, American YouTuber and educator
- Cor van den Heuvel, poet and editor
- Mark Langdon Hill, U.S. Congressman
- Linda Kasabian, former Manson Family member involved in the Helter Skelter Murders
- Louis B. Lausier, mayor (1941–1955) and candidate for Governor (1948)
- Moses Macdonald, U.S. Congressman
- Hilary F. Mahaney, football player
- Marc Malon, politician
- Prentiss Mellen, U.S. Senator and jurist
- Thomas Bird Mosher, publisher
- Wallace H. Nutting, Four-star general and mayor of Biddeford
- Bernard Osher, businessman and philanthropist
- Freddy Parent, professional baseball player
- Henry B. Quinby, physician and 52nd Governor of New Hampshire
- Marion Sandler, Co-founder and CEO of Golden West Financial Corporation
- Daniel E. Somes, U.S. Congressman and mayor
- Charles A. Shaw, mayor (1865–1866), inventor and entrepreneur
- Bettina Steinke, muralist, was born here in 1913
- James Sullivan, jurist and the seventh Governor of Massachusetts
- George Thatcher, judge and congressman
- Joanne Twomey, state representative (1998–2006) and mayor (2006–2011)
- Joan Wasser, singer and songwriter
- Amos Whitney, engineer and inventor

== See also ==
- Neal Manufacturing Company
