= James Montgomery Flagg House =

Historic house in Maine, United States

- U.S. National Register of Historic Places
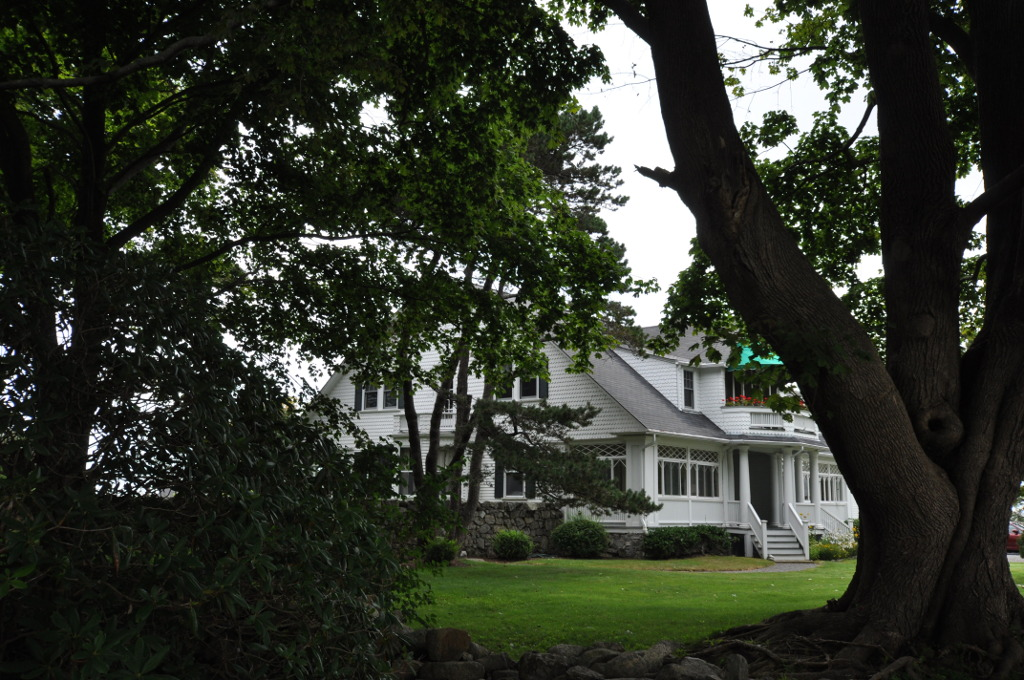
- The house in 2014

- Location within Maine Location within the United States
- Location: St. Martin's Lane, Biddeford Pool, Biddeford, Maine
- Coordinates: 43°27′00″N 70°20′38″W
- Area: 2.7 acres (1.1 ha)
- Built: 1910
- Architectural style: Craftsman/Bungalow
- NRHP reference No.: 80000260
- Added to NRHP: April 23, 1980

The James Montgomery Flagg House is a historic house in the Biddeford Pool area of Biddeford, York County, Maine. It was built in 1910 as the summer home of James Montgomery Flagg, a New York-based artist and illustrator known for political cartoons and the iconic World War I recruiting poster depicting Uncle Sam. The house is decorated with murals painted by Flagg, and was listed on the National Register of Historic Places. In 2013, its owner, citing the building's deteriorated condition, received approval to demolish and rebuild the house, preserving Flagg's murals.

== Description and history ==
The Flagg House is located on the north side of Biddeford Pool, a peninsula jutting into the Gulf of Maine south of the mouth of the Saco River. It is one of a cluster of houses located at the northern end of St. Martin's Lane, a private lane bisecting a golf course. It is a 1½ wood frame bungalow, with a side-facing gable roof, twin chimneys, and a stuccoed exterior. The main facade is oriented to the south, away from the sea, and is seven bays wide with center entry. The roof above has two shed-roof dormers. The north (seaward) facade is similar, although it has a single wide dormer in the roof. Single-story wings extend the building to either side.

The house was built in 1910 for James Montgomery Flagg (1877–1960), and it was his summer retreat until 1940. He painted wall murals of Maine landscapes and coastal seascapes throughout its first floor. The house was listed on the National Register of Historic Places in 1980. In 2013, the Biddeford Historic Preservation Commission approved the demolition of the house. The owner has promised to preserve the murals.

== See also ==
- National Register of Historic Places listings in York County, Maine
