= The Adventures of Uncle Sam, in Search After His Lost Honor =

1816 book by Frederick Augustus Fidfaddy

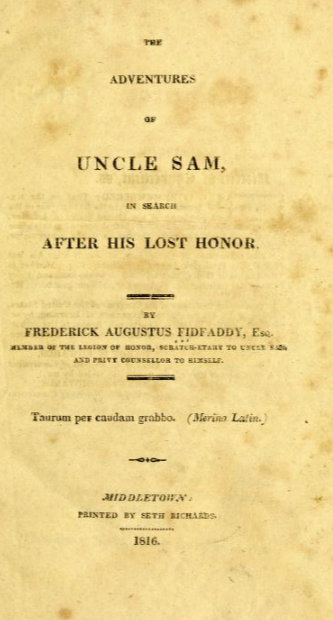
- Title page for The Adventures of Uncle Sam, in Search After His Lost Honor (1816)
- Author: Frederick Augustus Fidfaddy
- Language: English
- Genre: Allegory
- Publication date: 1816
- Publication place: United States
- Pages: 162

The Adventures of Uncle Sam, in Search After his Lost Honor is an allegorical book published in 1816 written by Frederick Augustus Fidfaddy. The book was written in English and contains 162 pages. It was republished in 1971 by Liberty House, a division of Gregg Press, in Saddle River, New Jersey. The book is a satire on the policies leading up to the War of 1812 and the events of that war, modeled after John Arbuthnot's 1712 The Law is a Bottomless Pit, and his immediately following History of John Bull. Albert Matthews, writing in the Proceedings of the American Antiquarian Society in 1908, asserted that this book was the first use in literature (as distinct from newspapers) of the term Uncle Sam to personalise the United States.
