= Uncle Sam Memorial Statue =

Statue of "Uncle" Samuel Wilson in Massachusetts, US

Coordinates: 42.415833°N 71.152972°W

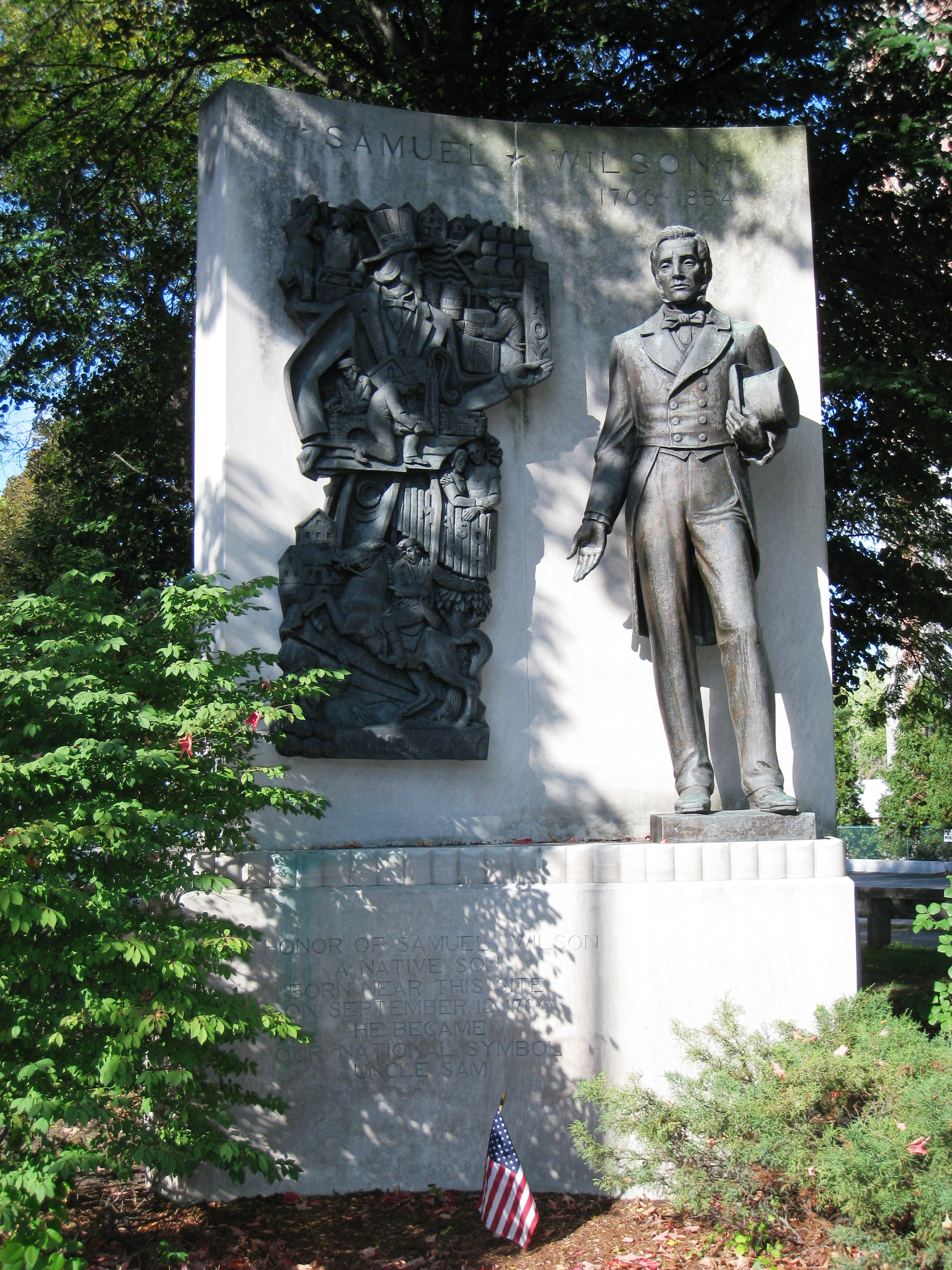
- Artist: Theodore Cotillo Barbarossa
- Year: 1976
- Type: Bronze
- Dimensions: 264 cm (104 in)
- Location: Town Center; Arlington, Massachusetts

The Uncle Sam Memorial Statue is a statue commemorating Samuel Wilson, perhaps the original Uncle Sam, near his birthplace in the center of Arlington, Massachusetts, United States. It was sculpted by Theodore Cotillo Barbarossa. It is located on Mystic Street, across from the Cyrus Dallin Art Museum, and adjacent to the Minuteman Bikeway.

The sculpture is a bronze relief of Uncle Sam and three-dimensional sculpture of Samuel Wilson, installed on a limestone base in front of a wall rising from the base's rear. It was funded by Frederick A. Hauck of Cincinnati, Ohio, cast in 1976, installed during the United States Bicentennial on September 11, 1976, and dedicated April 18, 1977.

The bronze relief depicts the life and work of Samuel Wilson in Troy, New York and Mason, New Hampshire, and in Menotomy, Massachusetts (now Arlington, Massachusetts). The relief includes a depiction of the familiar image of the elderly "Uncle Sam" figure in top hat and tails. At its top is a butcher and a ship coming in to dock next to the word "TROY"; in the middle is a pioneer couple standing behind a fence with the words "MASON N-H"; and at the bottom is a soldier on horseback above the word "MENOTOMY." To the relief's right is a standing portrait of Wilson carrying his top hat in the crook of his left arm and extending his right hand slightly.

The sculpture is approximately 8 feet, 8 inches high, on a base approximately 15 feet, 8 inches high by 10 feet wide. Its weight is 17 tons. It was cast and erected by Eleftherios Karkadoulias, with stone work fabricated by Woolery Stone Company, and contains a number of inscriptions, including:

- Base, front above sculpture: SAMUEL WILSON / 1766-1854
- Base, front below figure: IN HONOR OF SAMUEL WILSON / A NATIVE SON / BORN NEAR THIS SITE / ON SEPTEMBER 13, 1766 / HE BECAME / OUR NATIONAL SYMBOL / UNCLE SAM
- Base, bronze plaque on side of base: UNVEILED / SEPTEMBER / 11-1976 / DEDICATED / APRIL-18, 1977 / FREDERICK A. HAUCK / A GIFT TO THE TOWN OF ARLINGTON / MASS. AND THE PEOPLE OF THE UNITED STATES THROUGH THE GENEROUS / CONTRIBUTION OF FREDERICK A. HAUCK / OF CINCINNATI, OHIO / DESIGNER-SCULPTOR T.C. BARBAROSSA / BELMONT, MASS. / CAST BY ELEFTHERIOS KARKADOULIAS / CINCINNATI, OHIO / PROJECT COORDINATOR / THE ARLINGTON JAYCEES / BOARD OF SELECTMEN / ARTHUR D. SAUL, JR., CHAIRMAN / ROBERT B. WALSH / ANN MAHON POWERS / MARGARET H. SPENGLER / ROBERT H. MURRAY / TOWN MANAGER / DONALD R. MARQUIS / UNCLE SAM STATUE COMMITTEE / WILLIAM J. BECK / JACK R. DONALSON / JAMES D. HOBBS / JAMES F. LAWSON, JR. / STEPHEN PEKICH / FREDERICK E. PITCHER / JOHN G. PERRY / WILLIAM J. SCAGLIONE.

== Gallery ==
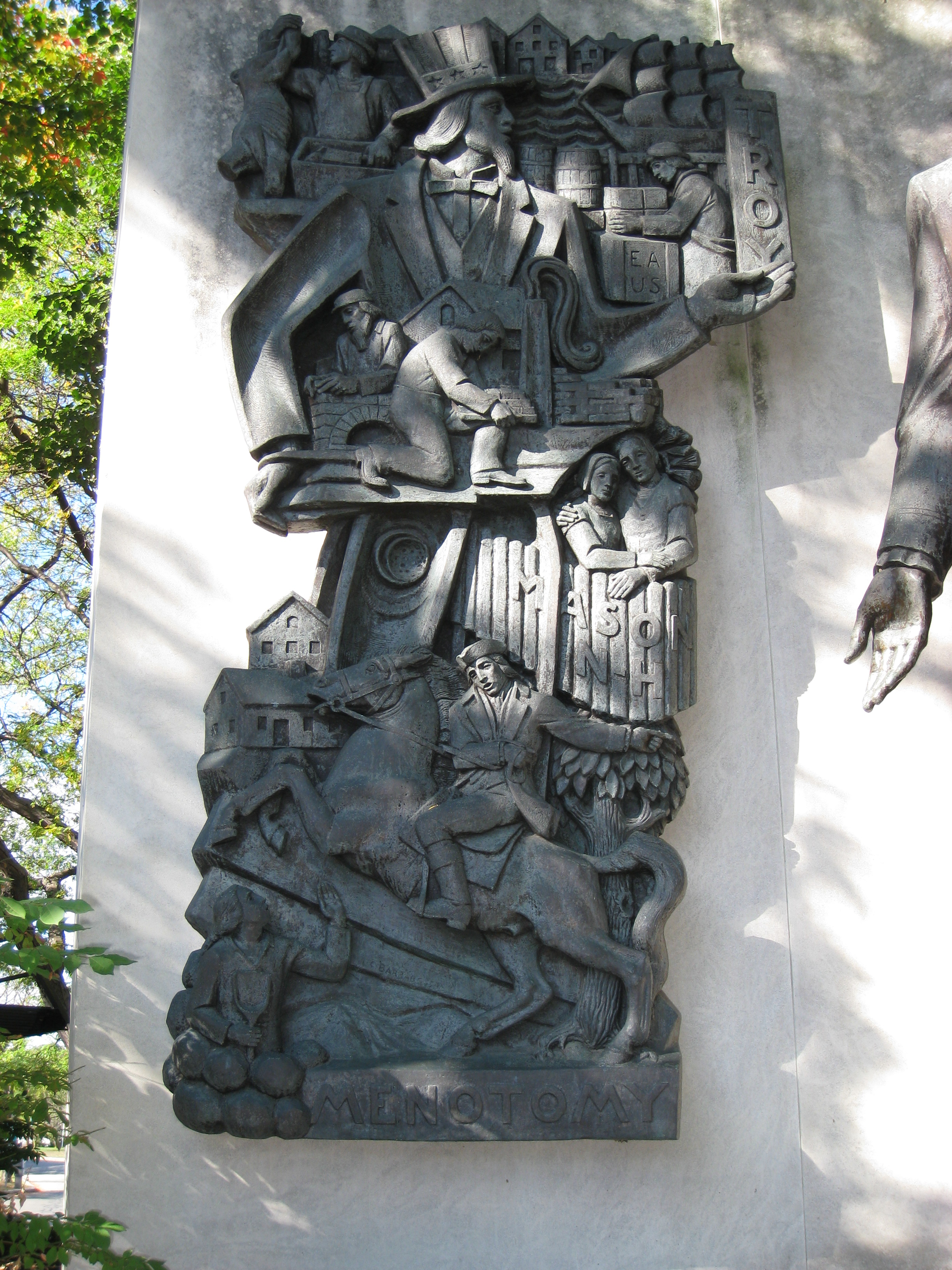
Uncle Sam detail

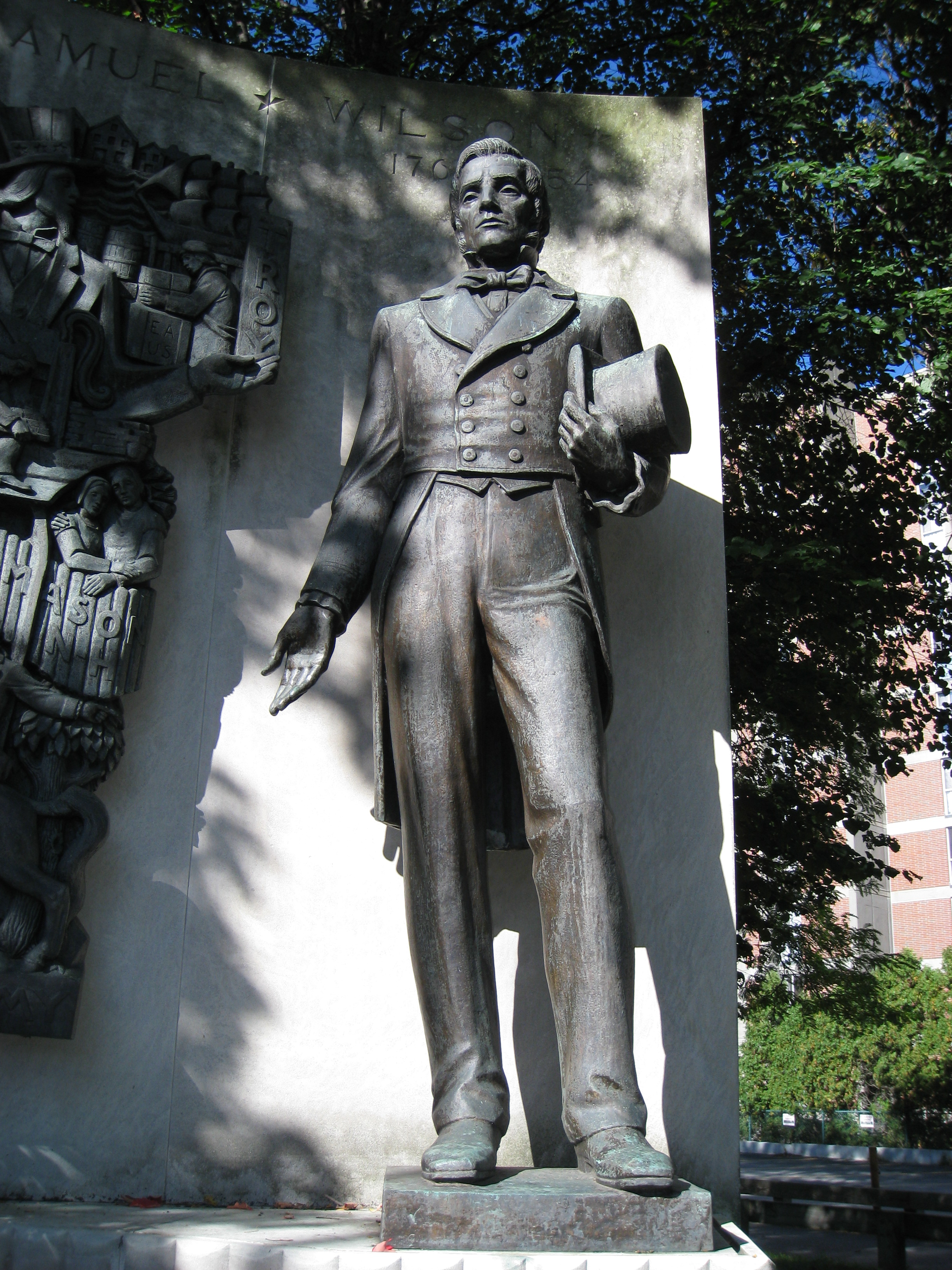
Samuel Wilson detail

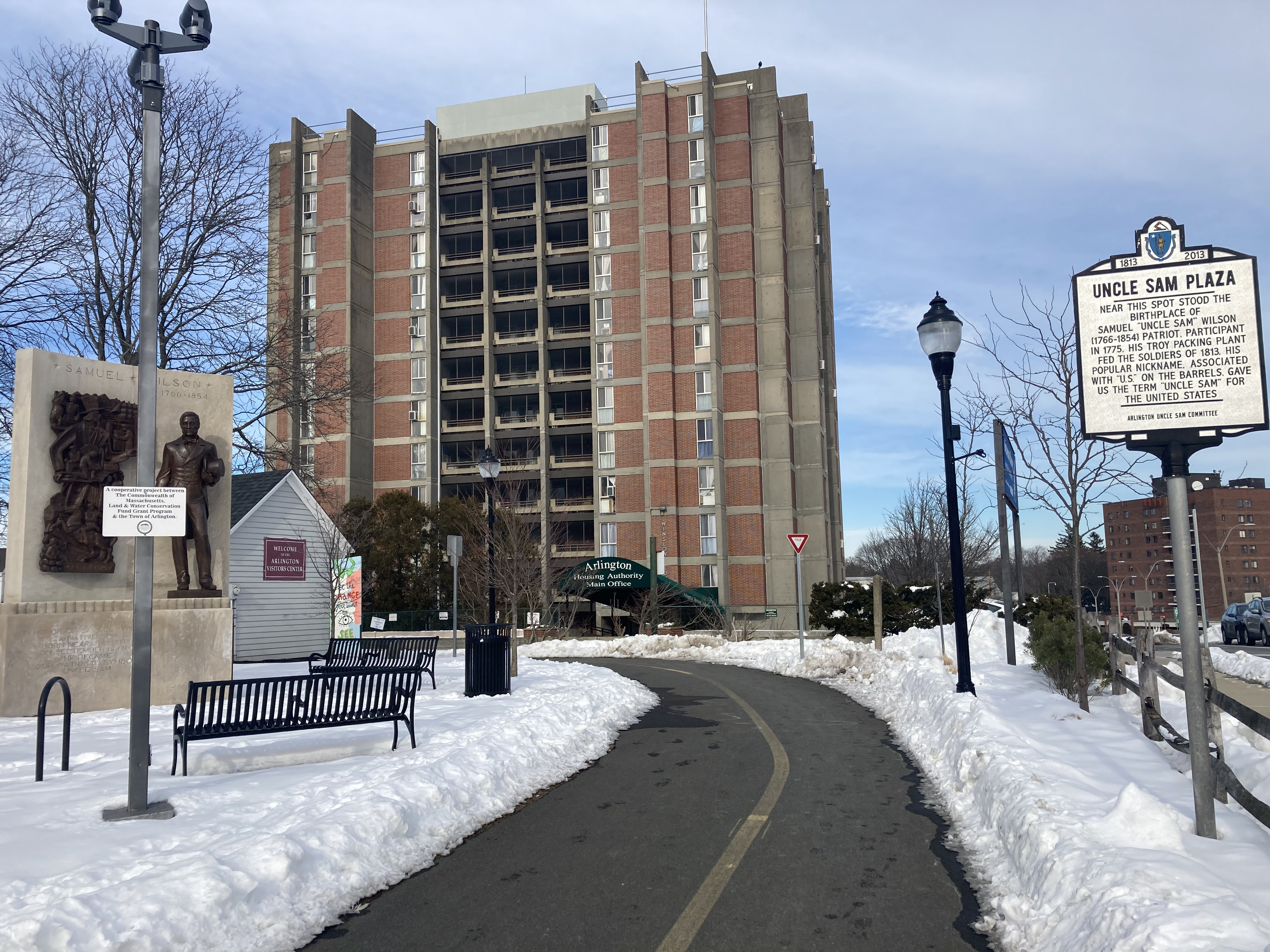
Uncle Sam Plaza
