= Wake Up America Day =

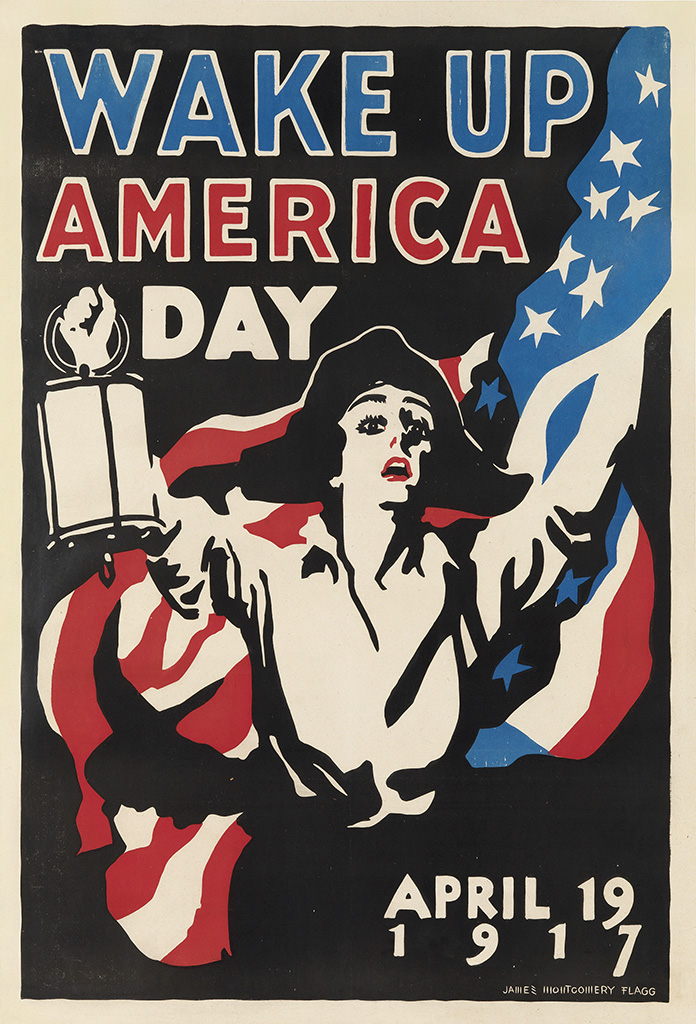
James Montgomery Flagg (1870-1960) poster celebrating Wake Up America Day on April 19, 1917 with Jean Earle Mohle dressed as Paul Revere

Wake Up America Day was celebrated on April 19, 1917 in New York City to coincide with Patriots' Day. It was designed to boost recruiting for World War I. James Montgomery Flagg designed the posters and the floats in the parade. Jean Earle Mohle dressed as Paul Revere and rode a horse.

Media related to Wake Up America Day at Wikimedia Commons
