= Theodore Cotillo Barbarossa =

American sculptor (1906–1992)

Theodore Cotillo Barbarossa (1906–1992) was an American sculptor active primarily in New York City, Washington, D.C., and Boston.

Barbarossa was born in Ludlow, Vermont, and studied at the Massachusetts College of Art and Yale University. He then became a sculptor in New York City, lived for a time in Belmont, Massachusetts and Alton, New Hampshire, and died at the Lahey Clinic in Burlington, Massachusetts.

Barbarossa was a fellow of the National Sculpture Society, and a member of the National Academy of Design, the Allied Artists of America, and the Audubon Artists.

== Image Library ==
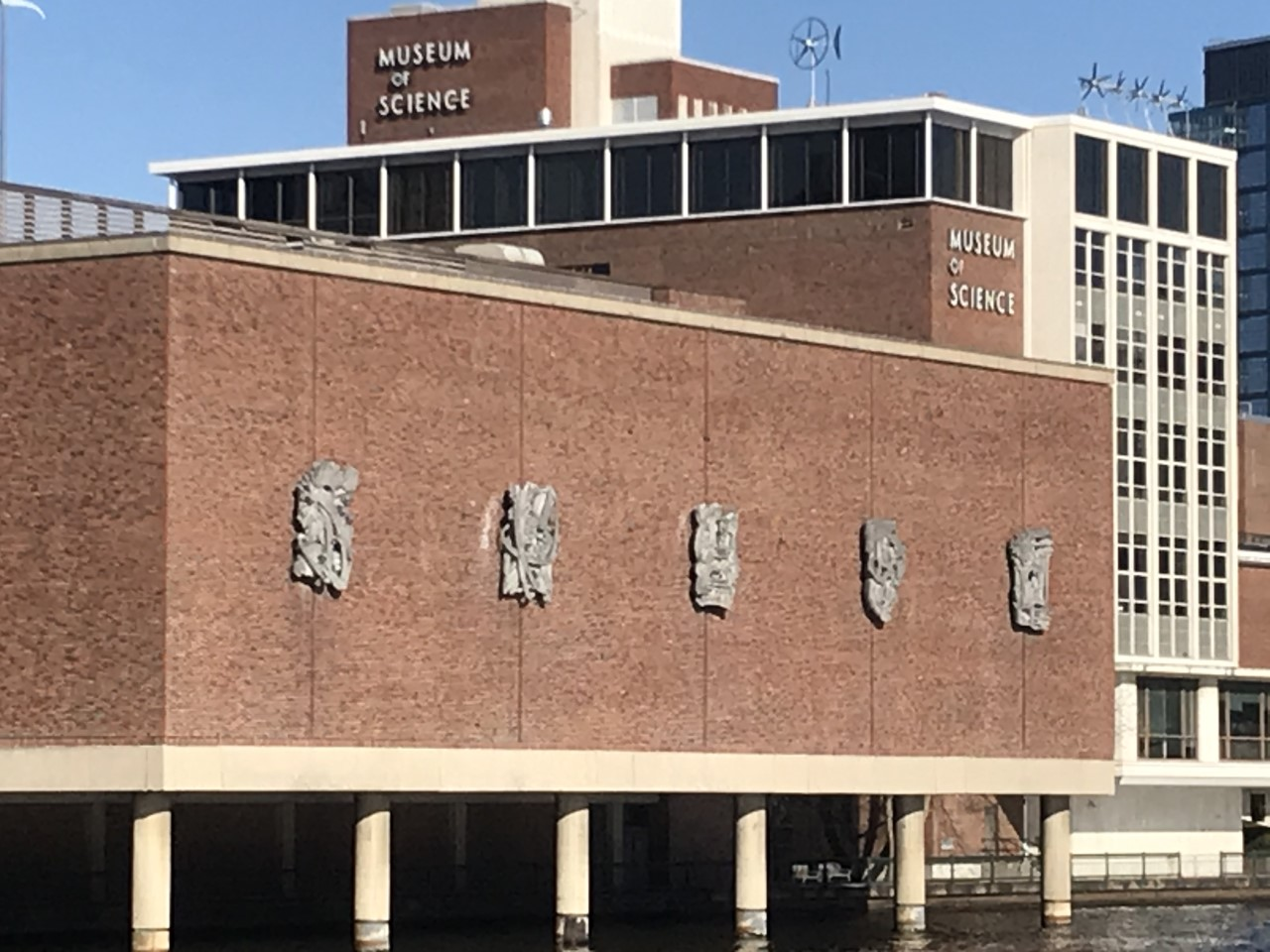
Theodore Barbarossa sculptured panels that represent Astronomy, Industry, Man, Nature and Energy

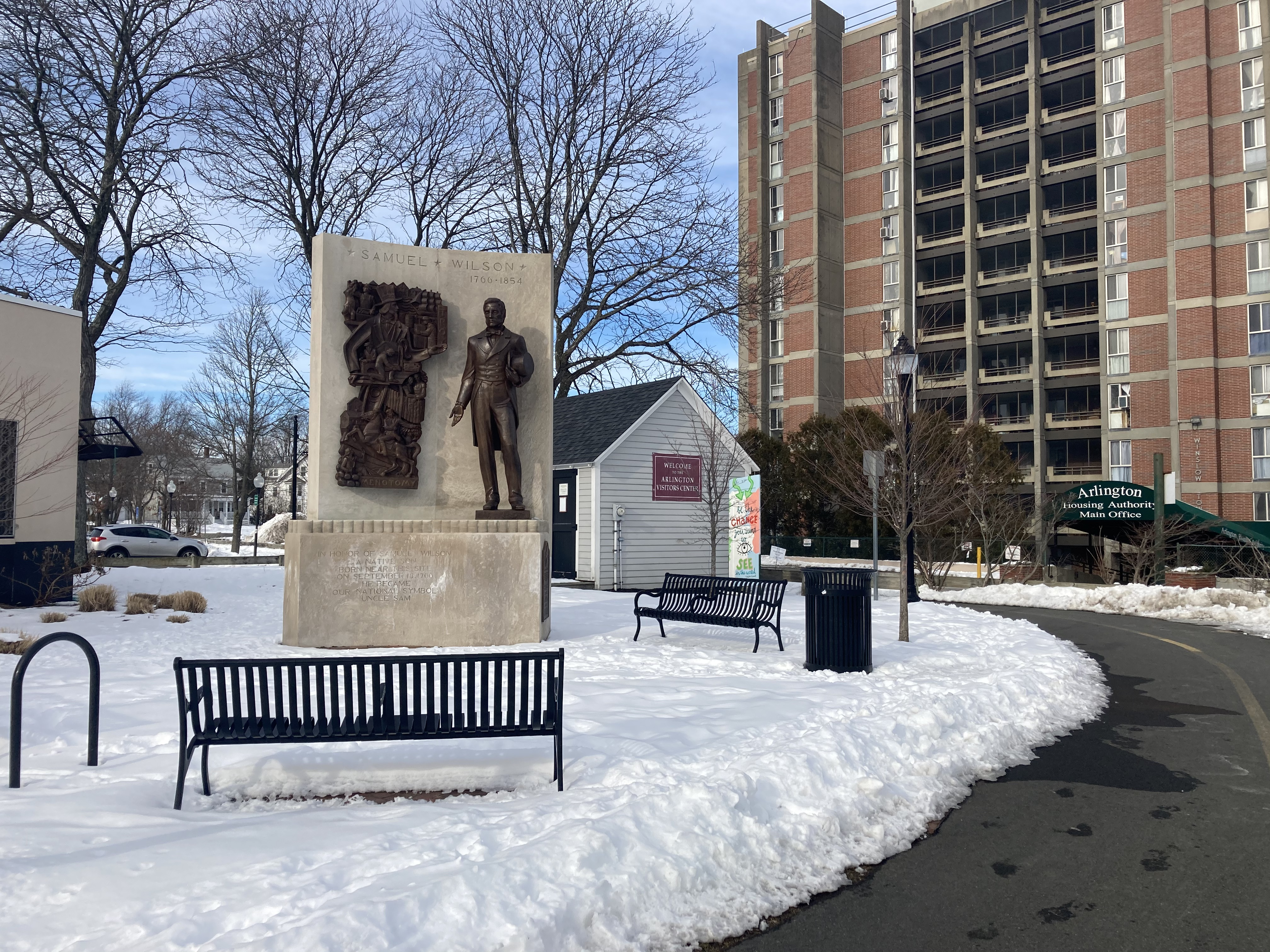
Uncle Sam Memorial in its entirety, in situ.

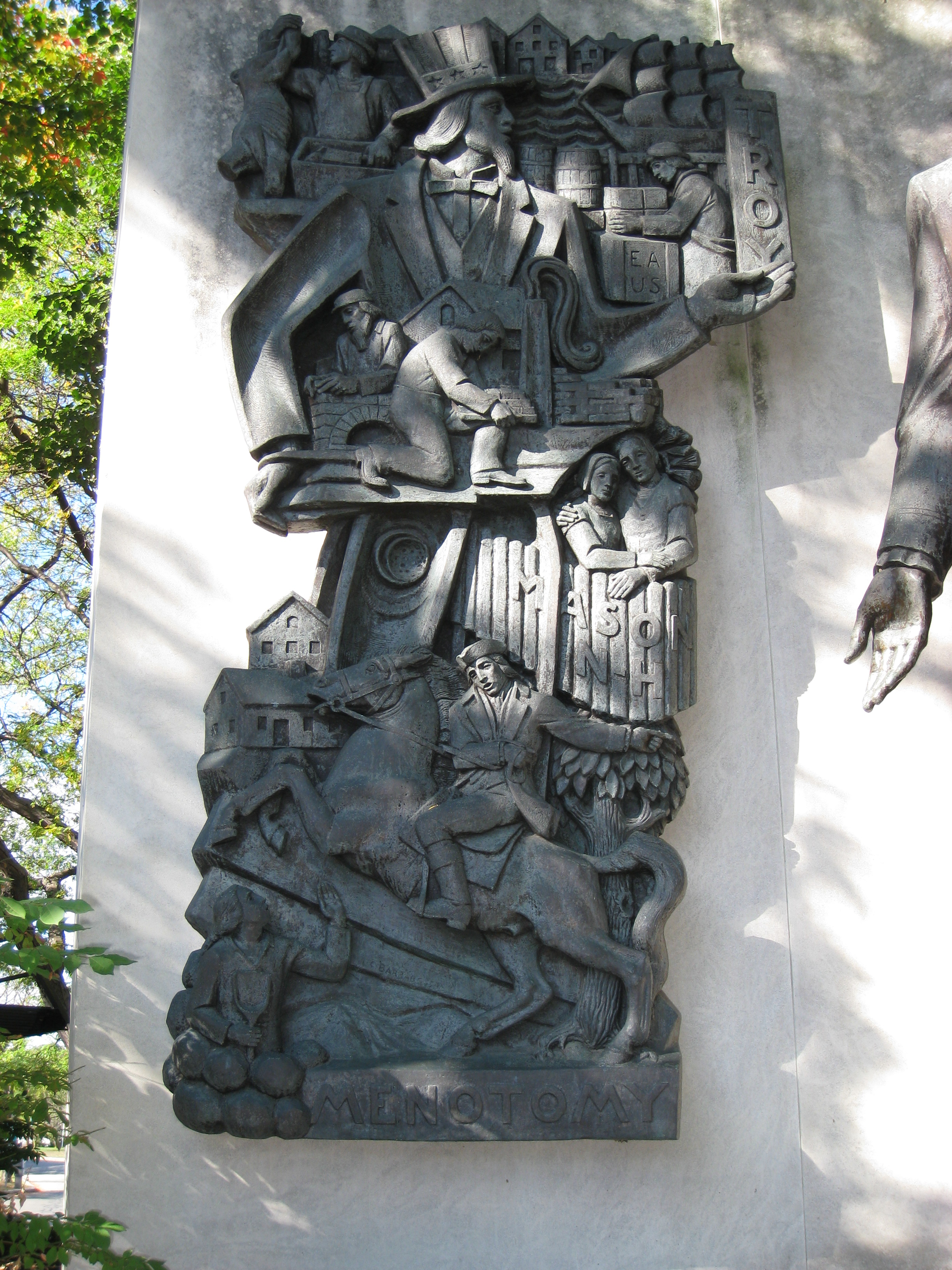
Uncle Sam Memorial Statue, On the bottom of the relief is a soldier on horseback above the word "MENOTOMY."

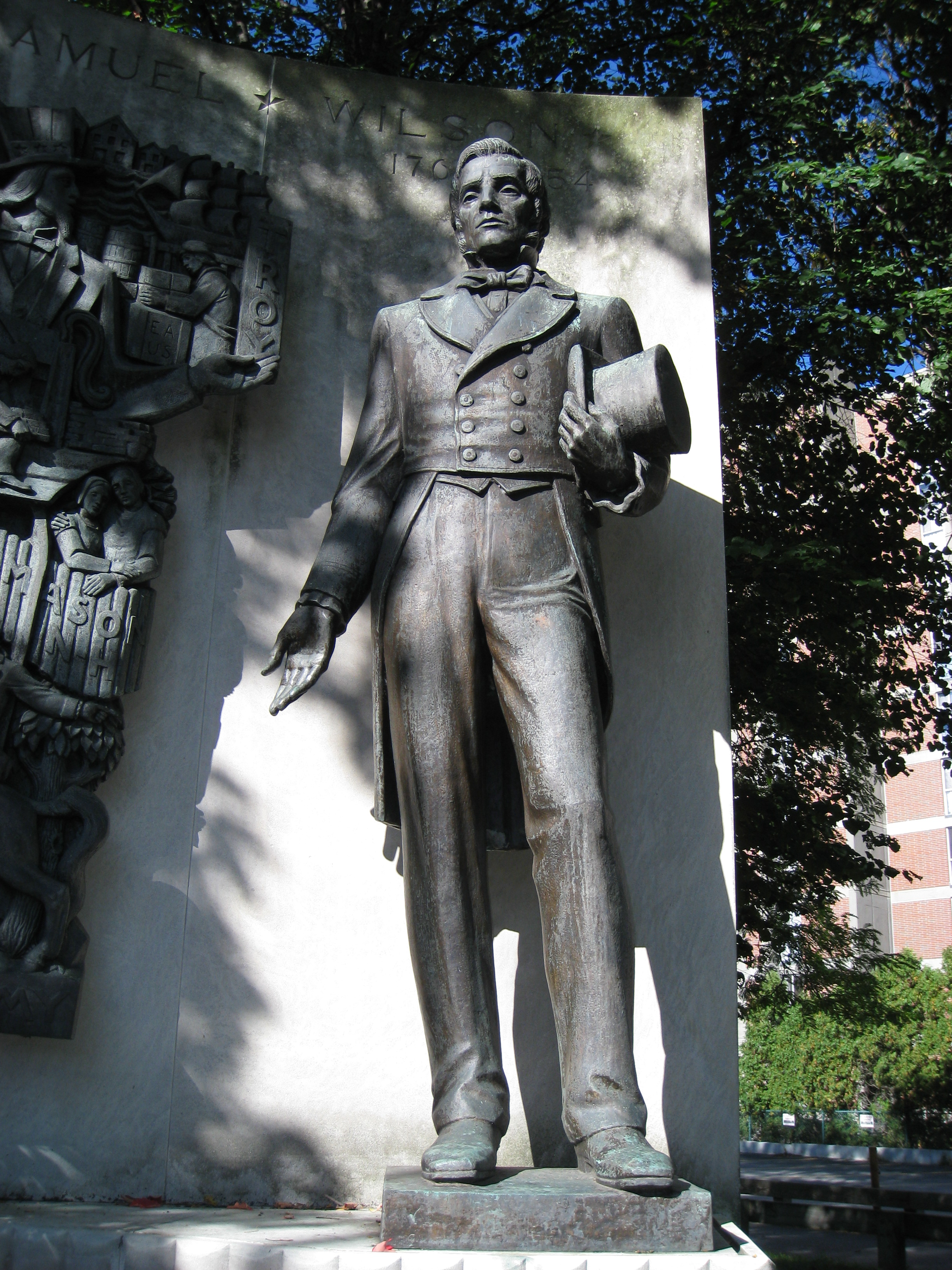
Close up of Sam Wilson who supplied meat to the military during the Civil War.

== Selected works ==
- Arlington, Massachusetts - The Uncle Sam Memorial Statue (1976)
- Cathedral of the Assumption of the Blessed Virgin Mary, Baltimore, Maryland
- Cathedral of St. John the Divine, New York City
- Museum of Science facade, Boston, Massachusetts - Five Carved Stone Panels
- National Academy of Design, New York City - Saint Sebastian
- National Shrine of the Immaculate Conception, Washington, D.C. - Pope Pius X, (1961–1962)
- 1939 New York World's Fair
- Saint Thomas Church (New York City)
- Sumner Street Elderly Housing, Heritage House, Boston, Massachusetts - Commemorative Relief of Noddle Island
- Washington Cathedral - Baptism of Christ, 1968; The Three Wisemen, 1968; Who For Our Salvation - Christ Saving Peter from Drowning, (1969)
