= James Montgomery Flagg =

American artist (1877–1960)

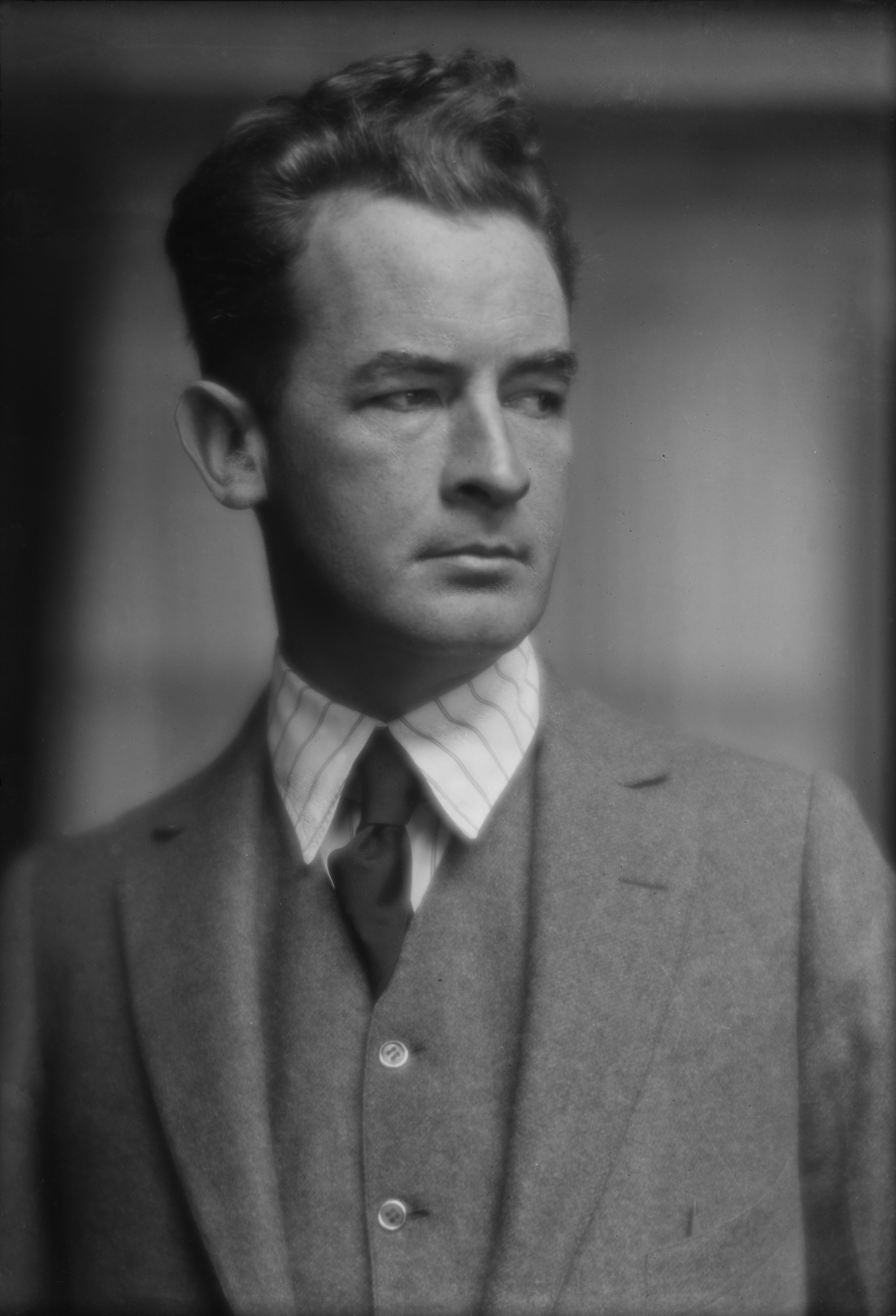
- Flagg in 1915, photographed by Arnold Genthe
- Born: June 18, 1877; Pelham, New York, U.S.
- Died: May 27, 1960 (aged 82); Manhattan, New York City, New York, U.S.
- Occupations: Artist and illustrator

James Montgomery Flagg (June 18, 1877 – May 27, 1960) was an American artist, comics artist, and illustrator. He worked in media ranging from fine art painting to cartooning, but is best remembered for his political posters, particularly his 1917 poster of Uncle Sam created for United States Army recruitment during World War I.

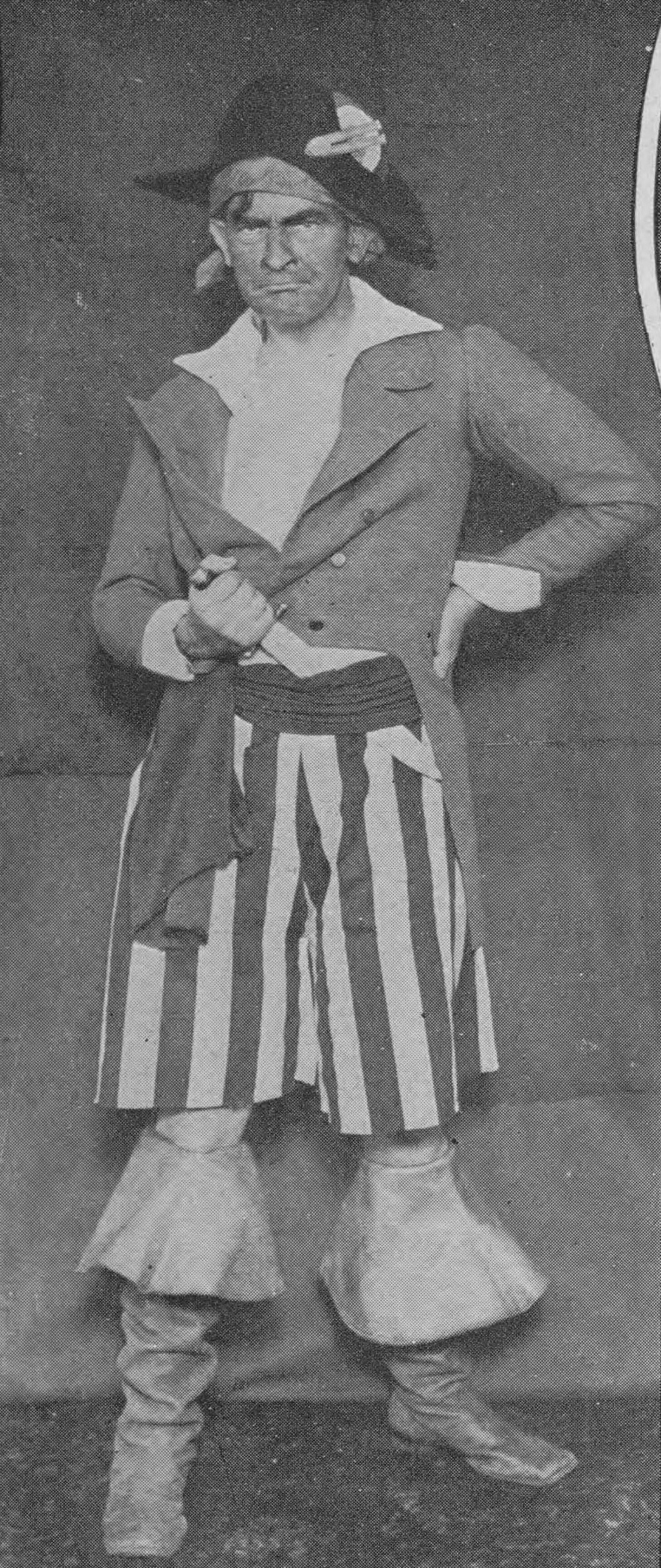
Flagg as Captain Kidd at the Illustrators' Ball, a masquerade ball in New York in 1917.

== Life and career ==
Flagg was born on June 18, 1877, in Pelham, New York. He was enthusiastic about drawing from a young age, and had illustrations accepted by national magazines by the age of 12. By 14, he was a contributing artist for Life magazine, and the following year was on the staff of another magazine, Judge. Both were humor magazines at the time, with no relation to the later popular Life.

From 1894 through 1898, he attended the Art Students League of New York. He studied fine art in London and Paris from 1898 to 1900, after which he returned to the United States, where he produced countless illustrations for books, magazine covers, political and humorous cartoons, advertising, and spot drawings. Among his creations was a comic strip that appeared regularly in Judge from 1903 until 1907, about a tramp character titled Nervy Nat.

In 1915, he accepted commissions from Calkins and Holden to create advertisements for Edison Photo and Adler Rochester Overcoats but only on the condition that his name would not be associated with the campaign.

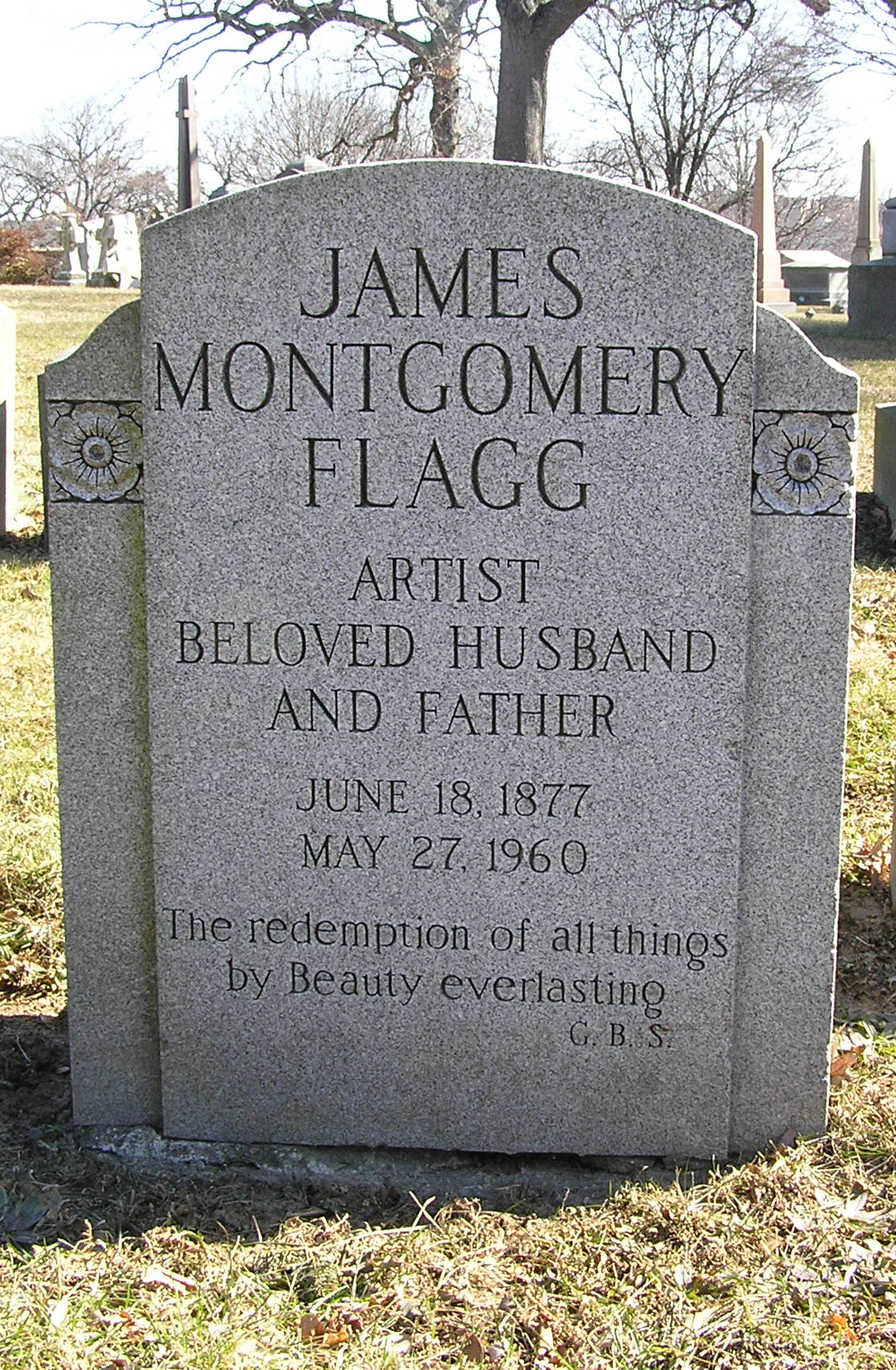
The grave of James Montgomery Flagg in Woodlawn Cemetery

He created his most famous work in 1917, a poster to encourage recruitment in the United States Army during World War I. It showed Uncle Sam pointing at the viewer (inspired by a 1914 British recruitment poster showing Lord Kitchener in a similar pose) with the caption "I Want YOU for U.S. Army". Flagg had first created the image for the July 6, 1916, cover of Frank Leslie's Illustrated Newspaper with the headline "What Are You Doing for Preparedness?" Over four million copies of the poster were printed during World War I, and it was revived for World War II. Flagg used his own face for that of Uncle Sam (adding age and the white goatee), he said later, simply to avoid the trouble of arranging for a model. President Franklin Delano Roosevelt praised his resourcefulness for using his own face as the model. Flagg had a neighbor, Walter Botts, pose as a model for the strong shoulders, and thrusting forefinger of the piece. (See Gallery below.)

In 1917, he also attended the Illustrators' Ball, one of many annual masquerade balls in Manhattan, New York. The artists-only event was held in the 1845-built Hotel Brevoort in Greenwich Village, a neighborhood where many artists and cartoonists lived at the time. That year, the theme was "Kaleidoscopic Ball," with no specific requirements for costumes. Flagg dressed as the Scottish sailor Captain William Kidd.

At his peak, Flagg was reported to have been the highest-paid magazine illustrator in America. He worked for The Saturday Evening Post and Collier's, which were two of the most popular U.S. journals. In 1946, Flagg published his autobiography, Roses and Buckshot. Apart from his work as an illustrator, Flagg painted portraits which reveal the influence of John Singer Sargent. Flagg's sitters included Mark Twain and Ethel Barrymore; his portrait of Jack Dempsey now hangs in the Great Hall of the National Portrait Gallery. In 1948, he appeared in a Pabst Blue Ribbon magazine ad which featured the illustrator working at an easel in his New York studio with a young lady standing at his side and a tray with an open bottle of Pabst and two filled glasses sat before them.

Toward the end of his life, when deteriorating eyesight forced him to give up his art, "he often took out his frustrations on his friends and himself." He died on May 27, 1960, in New York City. He was interred at Woodlawn Cemetery in The Bronx, New York City.

== Legacy ==
Fort Knox, Kentucky, has a parade field named for and dedicated to Flagg. It is called Flagg Field and located behind the Fort Knox Hotel. Fort Knox is also the home of U.S. Army Recruiting Command, which borders Flagg Field.

Flagg spent summers in Biddeford Pool, Maine, and his home, the James Montgomery Flagg House, was added to the National Register of Historic Places in 1980.

== Gallery ==
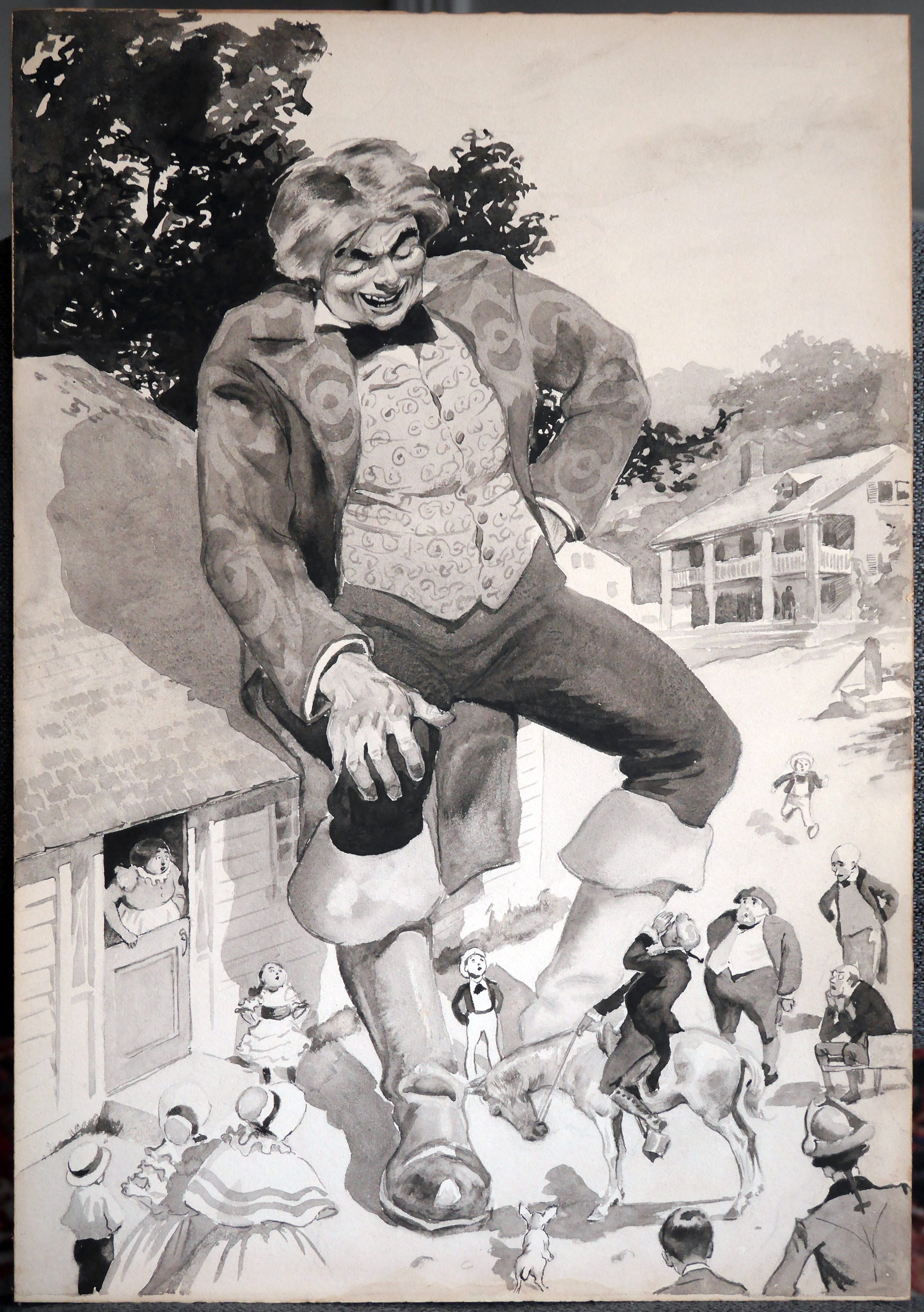
Illustration in St. Nicholas Illustrated magazine, January 1898.

President McKinley, illustration in Vanity Fair magazine, 1899

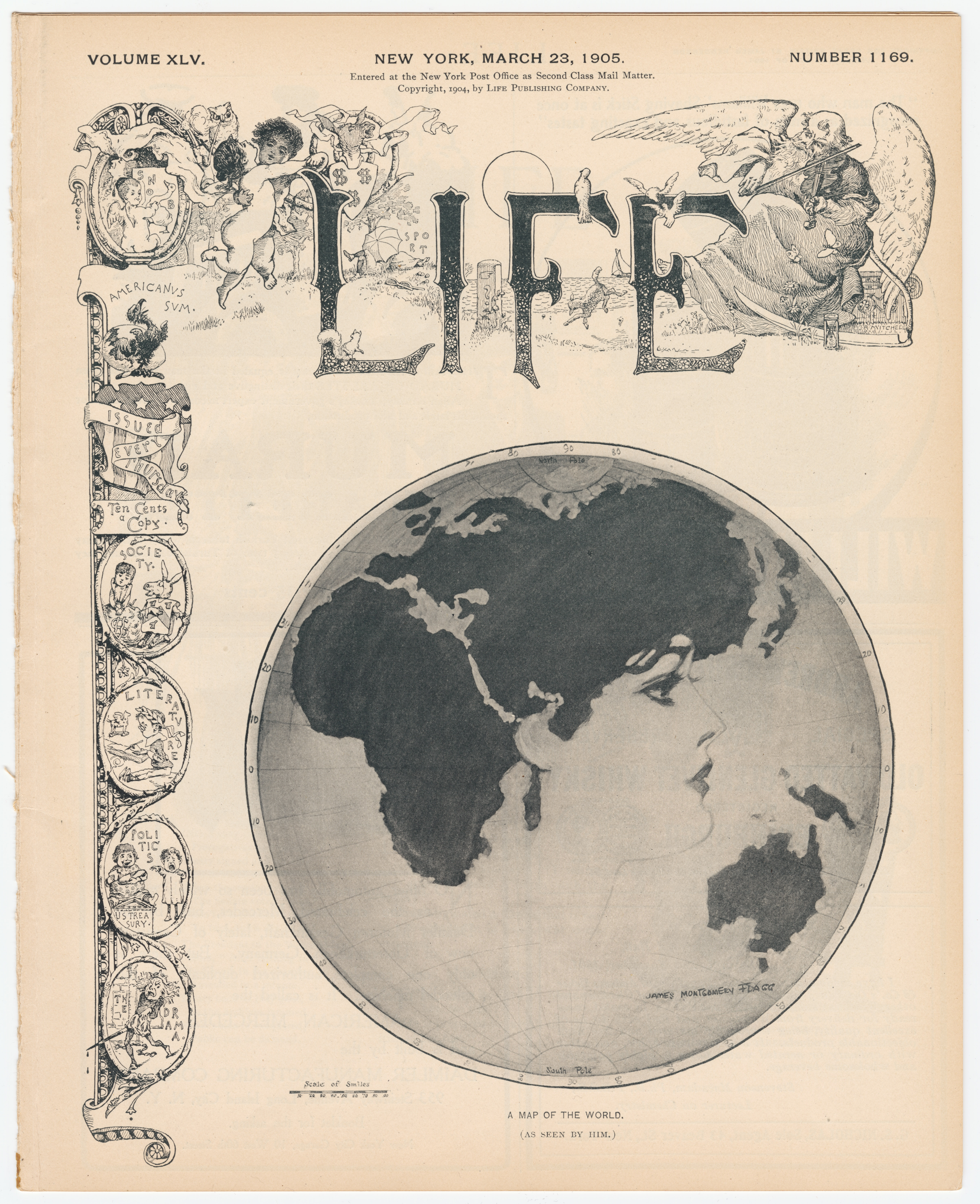
The World (As Seen By Him), 1905

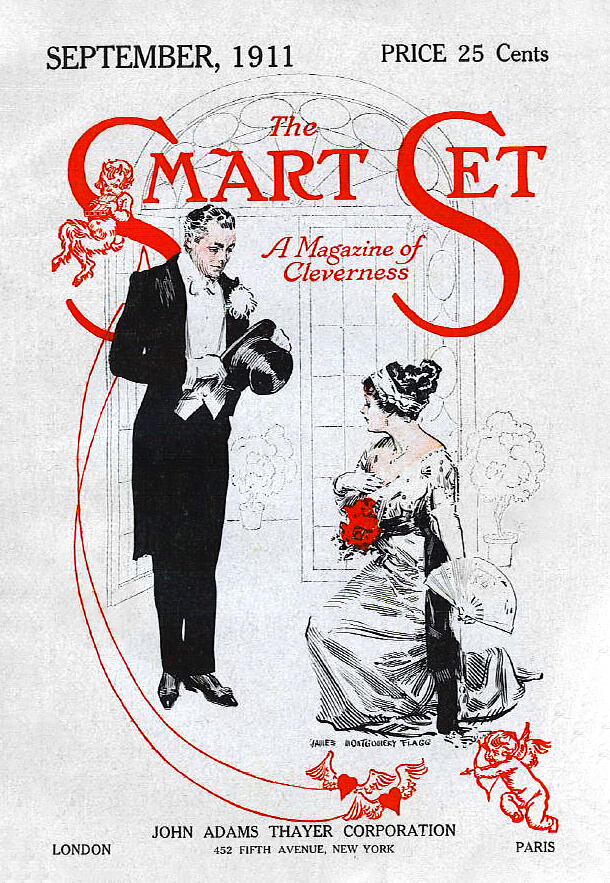
The Smart Set (Magazine cover) 1911

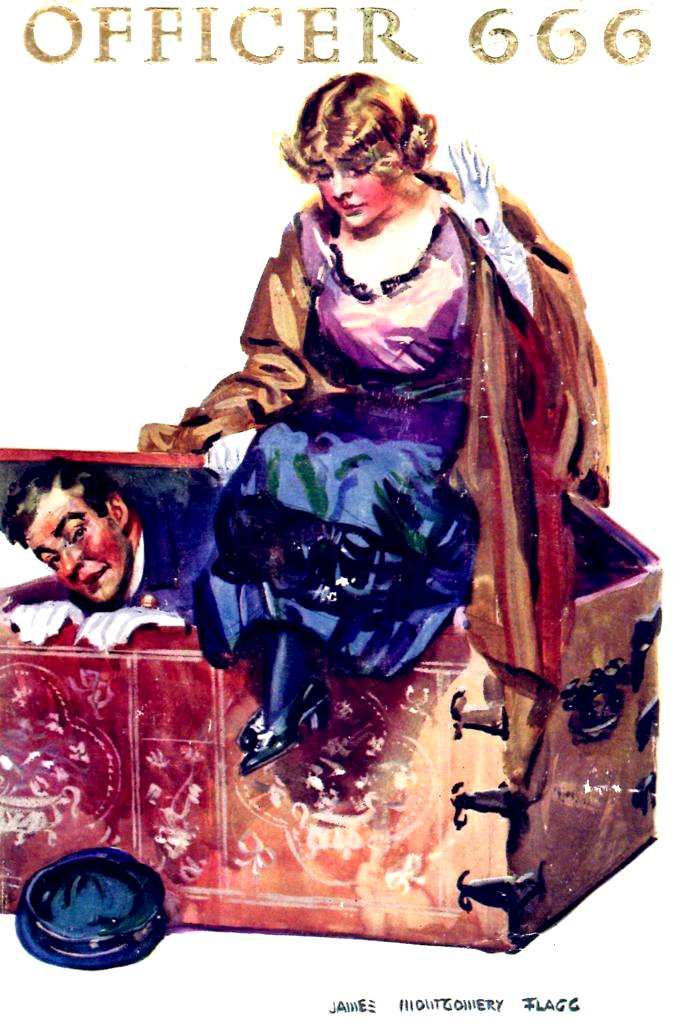
The cover of the popular novel Officer 666 by Barton Currie and Augustin MacHugh, 1912

Flagg's famous Uncle Sam recruitment poster (c. 1917)

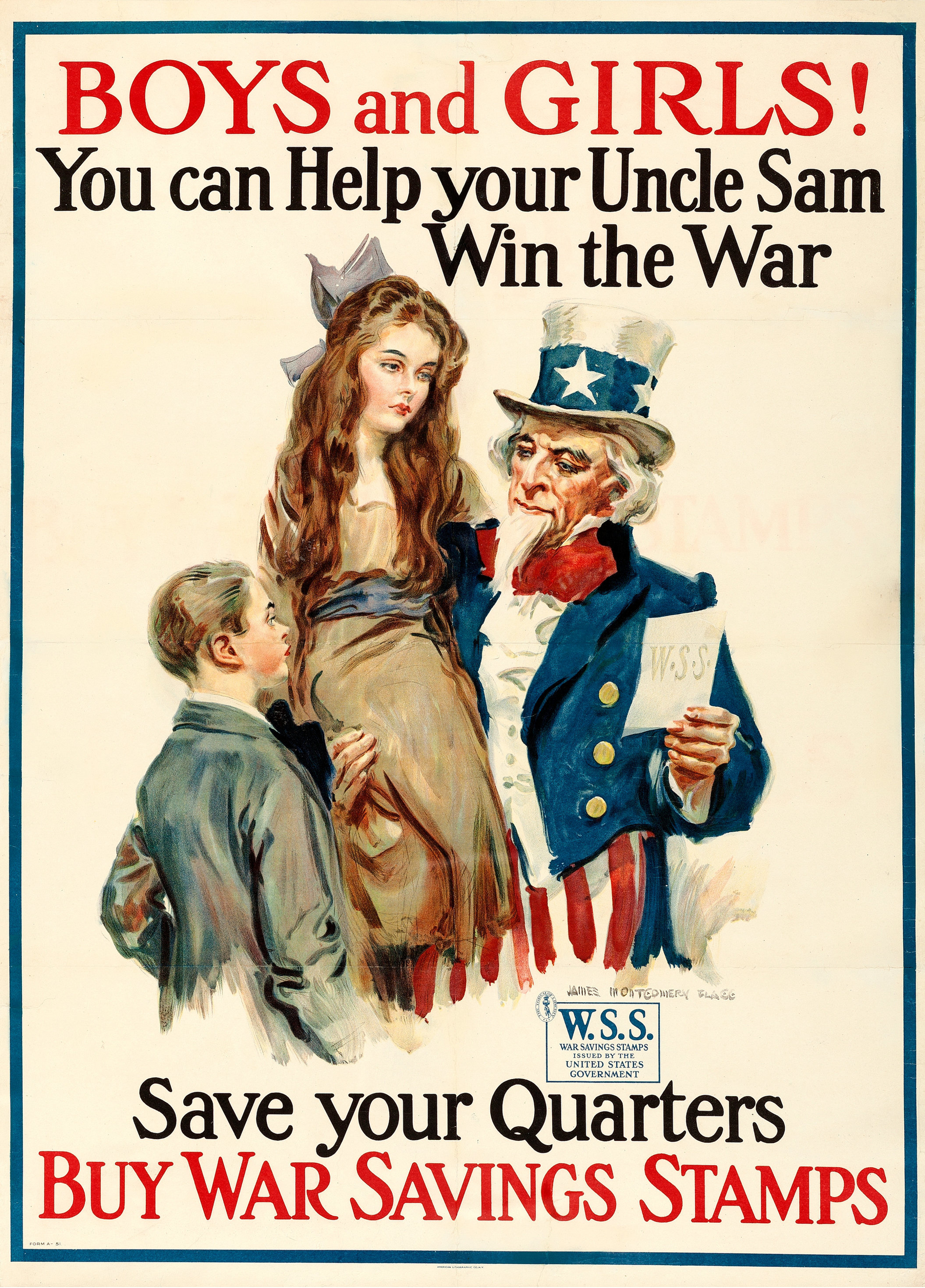
Uncle Sam Boys and Girls! 1917 war poster

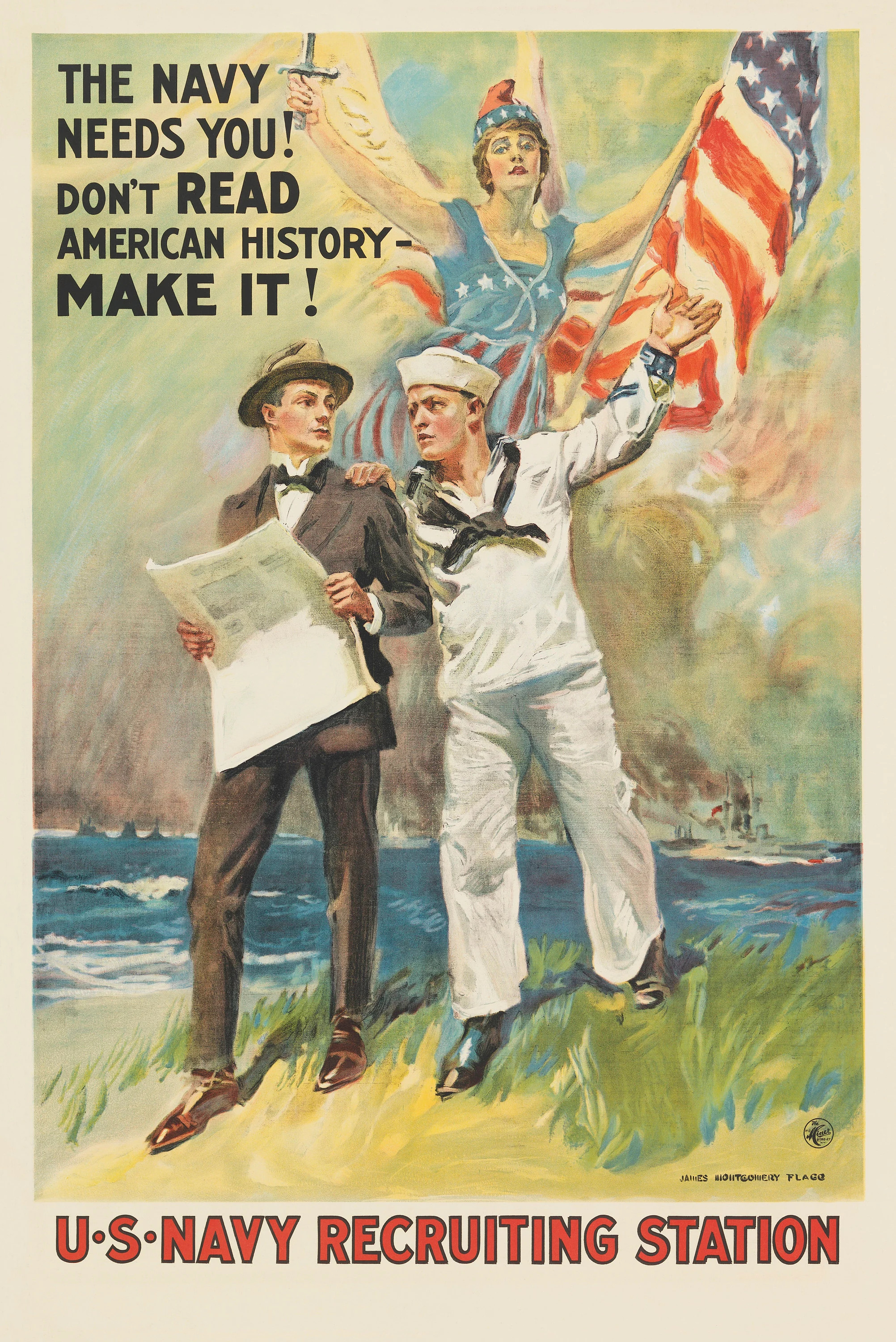
The Navy Needs You! Don't Read American History, Make It! (1917 or 1918)

Columbia urges planting victory gardens (1918)

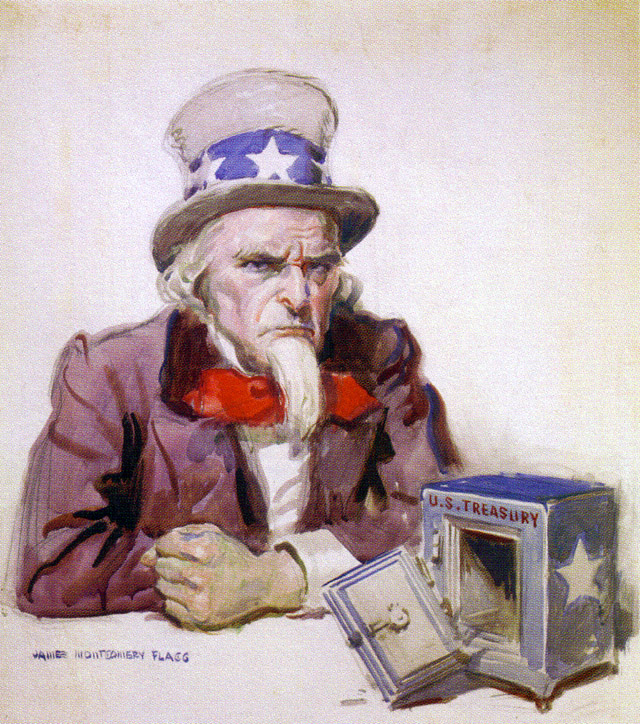
Uncle Sam with empty Treasury (1920)

Wake Up America, Civilization Calls Every Man Woman and Child! (1917)

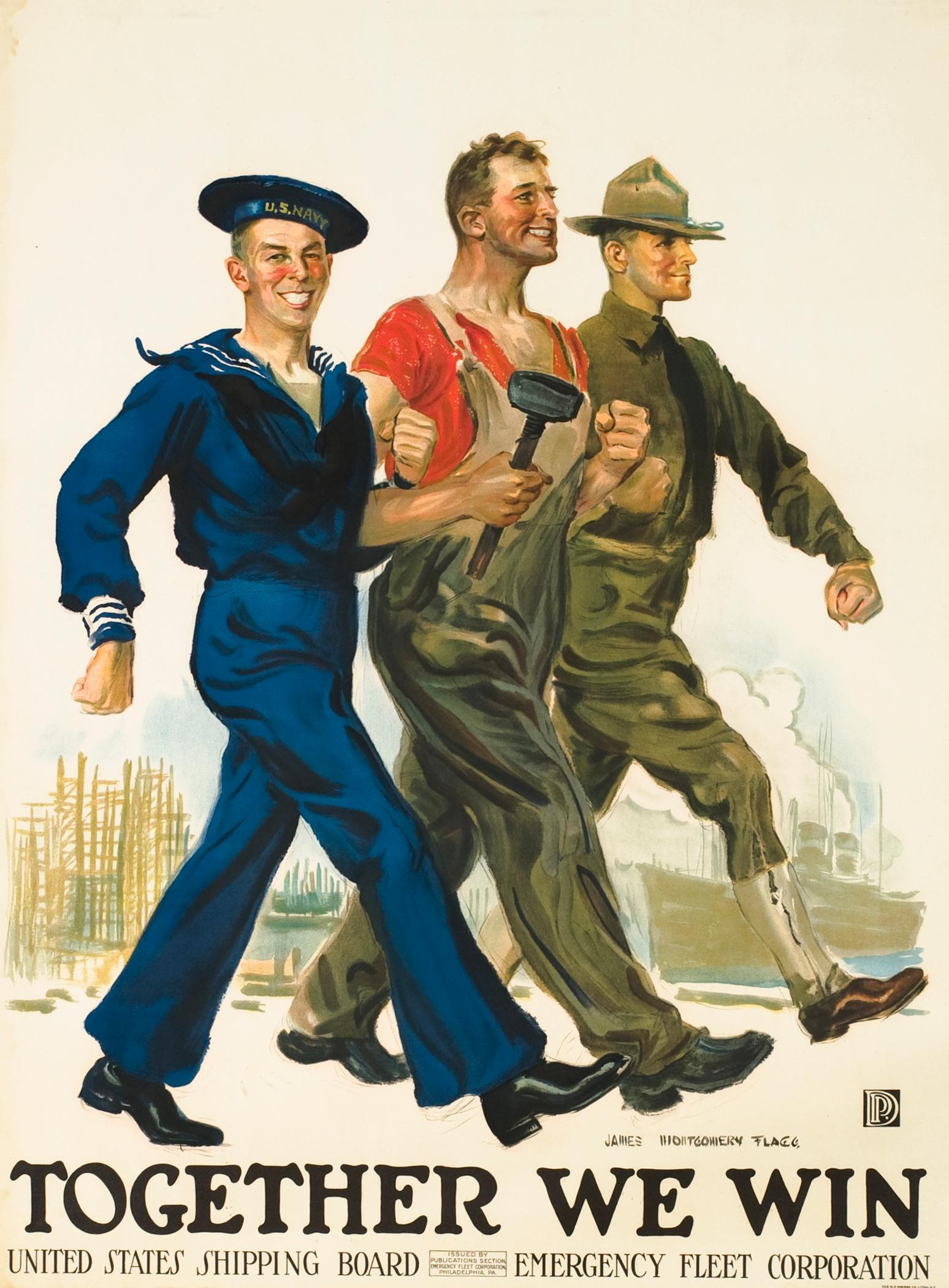
Together We Win
(World War I, 1917 or 1918)

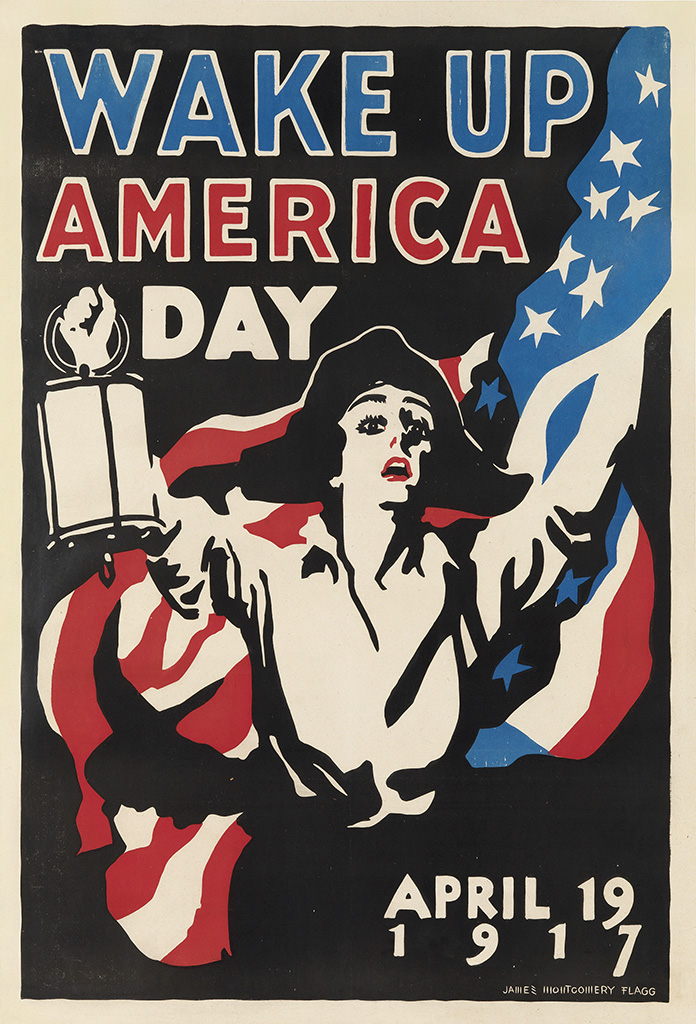
Wake Up America Day on April 19, 1917, with Jean Earle Mohle dressed as Paul Revere

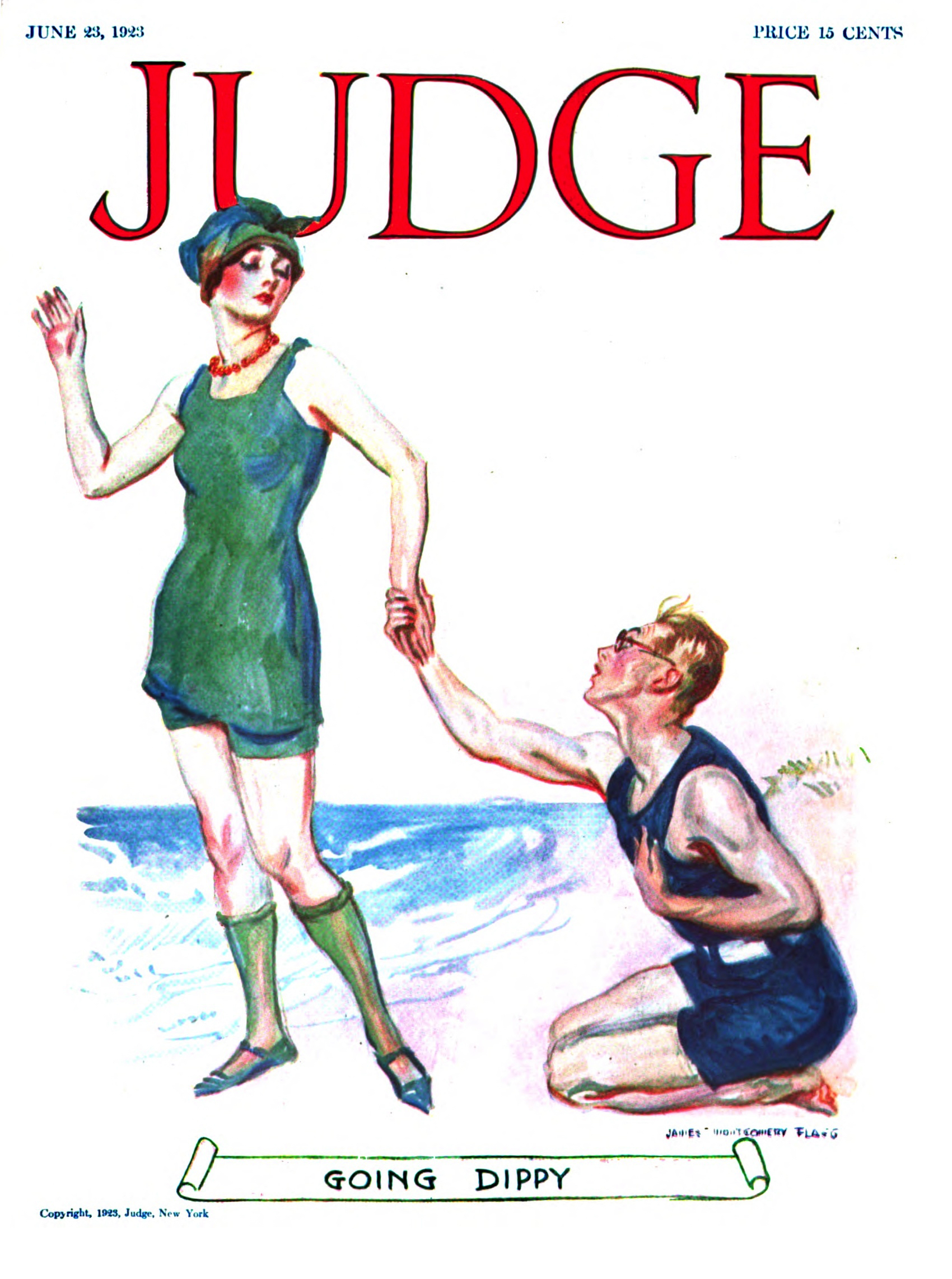
Judge cover from 1923. Flagg was a prolific cover artist for Judge.

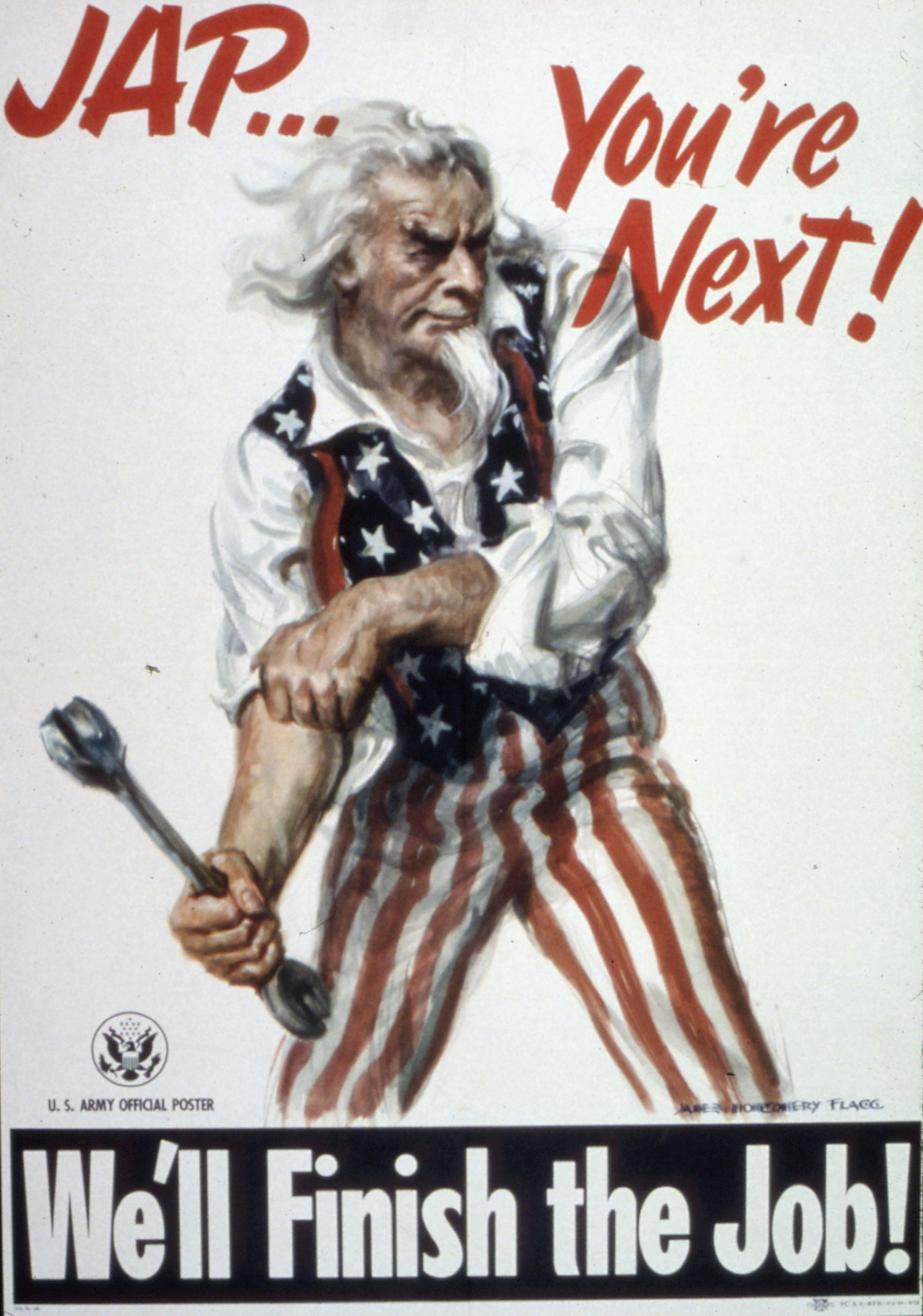
World War II US Army poster showing Uncle Sam holding wrench (a.k.a. spanner). Presumably released between VE Day and V-J Day (1945)
