= Maine State Route 237 =

State highway in Cumberland County, Maine, US

State Route 237

Route information
- Maintained by MaineDOT
- Length: 8.13 mi (13.08 km)
- Existed: 1957–present

Major junctions
- South end: SR 25 in Gorham
- US 202 / SR 4 in Gorham
- North end: SR 35 in Standish

Location
- Country: United States
- State: Maine
- Counties: Cumberland

Highway system
- Maine State Highway System; Interstate; US; State; Auto trails; Lettered highways
← SR 236	→ SR 238
← I-95	→ SR 96

State Route 237 (SR 237) is a state highway located in Cumberland County in southern Maine, United States. It begins at SR 25 in Gorham and runs for 8.13 miles (13.08 km) north to Standish, where it ends at SR 35. The highway functions as a bypass of the towns of Gorham, Windham and Standish.

== Route description ==
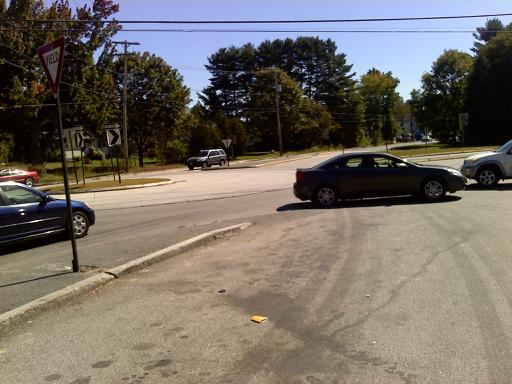
Little Falls seen from SR 237

SR 237 begins at SR 25 in Gorham, two miles (3.2 km) east of downtown. The route runs northwest, passing through the center of town and crossing over U.S. Route 202 (US 202) / SR 4. SR 237 continues northwest and crosses into the northeastern corner of Standish. The highway immediately terminates at SR 35 near Sebago Lake.

SR 237 runs parallel to, and northeast of, SR 114 (of which SR 237 is a former alignment) over its entire length.

== History ==
SR 237 was originally designated State Route 95 in 1946 over part of a former alignment of SR 114, which now runs parallel to the southwest. It was approximately 10 miles (16 km) in length and similar to the modern route. Following the designation of Interstate 95 in 1957, SR 95 became a duplicate numbering and was subsequently renumbered to SR 237.

== Major intersections ==
The entire route is in Cumberland County.

Location	mi	km	Destinations	Notes
Gorham	0.00	0.00	SR 25 (Main Street) – Gorham, Westbrook	Southern terminus
Gorham	2.85– 2.90	4.59– 4.67	US 202 / SR 4 (Gray Road) – Gorham, Windham	Roundabout
Standish	8.13	13.08	SR 35 (Chadbourne Road) – Sebago Lake, North Windham	Northern terminus
1.000 mi = 1.609 km; 1.000 km = 0.621 mi

== See also ==
- List of state highways in Maine
