= Maine State Route 112 =

State highway in York County, Maine, US

State Route 112

Route information
- Maintained by MaineDOT
- Length: 25.83 mi (41.57 km)
- Existed: 1925–present

Major junctions
- South end: US 1 / SR 5 / SR 9 in Saco
- I-95 / Maine Turnpike in Saco; US 202 / SR 4 in Buxton and Gorham; SR 25 in Gorham
- North end: SR 114 in Gorham

Location
- Country: United States
- State: Maine
- Counties: York

Highway system
- Maine State Highway System; Interstate; US; State; Auto trails; Lettered highways
| ← SR 111 | → SR 113 |

State Route 112 (SR 112) is part of Maine's system of numbered state highways, running from SR 9 in Saco to SR 114 in Gorham. The 26-mile-long (42 km) route runs in a C-shape and is signed as north–south.

== Route description ==
SR 112 begins in downtown Saco at the intersection of Main and Beach Streets. SR 9 runs southeast and southwest from this point. After heading northwest for about 150 feet (46 m), the route reaches the intersection of Elm Street which carries U.S. Route 1 (US 1) and SR 5. SR 5 and SR 112 form a concurrency and together head northwest along North Street. SR 5 heads off to the west at Spring Street while SR 112 continues alone. The road heads through residential neighborhoods of Saco with some businesses located along the road. After an interchange with Interstate 95 / Maine Turnpike, it heads into a more rural area with the road passing by some houses through mostly wooded areas. Before existing Saco, it intersects SR 117 at its southern terminus. After entering Buxton, SR 181 continues traveling in a northwesterly direction. At the community of Troy Hill, the road intersects US 202 and SR 4. Soon afterwards, in Bar Mills, it intersects SR 4A. Near West Buxton, SR 112 begins to closely parallel the Saco River and turn to the north.

After passing through West Buxton, SR 112 turns towards the northeast and intersects SR 22. The road leaves Buxton and enters Gorham, Cumberland County. It continues northeast before coming to an intersection with SR 25. The two routes head southeast towards Gorham Center for about 1.7 miles (2.7 km) before reaching a roundabout. SR 112 splits from the SR 25 concurrency and becomes a two-lane expressway which bypasses the town center to the west. It passes under an overpass carrying Flaggy Meadow Road and comes to another roundabout where the intersecting road is US 202 / SR 4. The SR 112 expressway resumes heading south through wetlands without any cross roads. The road curves to the east before it ends at a roundabout with SR 114 southeast of Gorham Center.

== History ==
From the route's formation until 1937, SR 112 had its northern terminus at SR 4A, then known as SR 111.

In 2008, SR 112 had its northern terminus changed again. Prior to 2008, the northern terminus for the route was SR 25 in Gorham. The route was extended as the outcome of a bypass project in Gorham. It was extended from SR 25 to SR 114, as a bypass route to allow traffic to avoid the intersection of US 202/SR 4 and SR 114.

== Major junctions ==
| County | Location | mi | km | Destinations | Notes |
|---|---|---|---|---|---|
| York | Saco | 0.00 | 0.00 | SR 9 (Main Street / Beach Street) – Camp Ellis | Southern terminus |
| York | Saco | 0.03 | 0.048 | US 1 / SR 5 south (Elm Street) – Scarborough, Biddeford | Southern end of SR 5 concurrency |
| York | Saco | 0.40 | 0.64 | SR 5 north (Spring Street) – Dayton | Northern end of SR 5 concurrency |
| York | Saco | 1.17 | 1.88 | To I-95 / Maine Turnpike / I-195 | Access via Industrial Park Road |
| York | Saco | 1.44 | 2.32 | I-95 / Maine Turnpike – Portland, Augusta, Kittery, Portsmouth | Exit 35 on I-95 / Turnpike |
| York | Saco | 6.61 | 10.64 | SR 117 north (Old Buxton Road) | Southern terminus of SR 117 |
| York | Buxton | 8.88 | 14.29 | US 202 / SR 4 (Narragansett Trail) to SR 117 – Hollis, Gorham | |
| York | Buxton | 9.46 | 15.22 | SR 4A (Main Street) – Hollis, Gorham | |
| York | Buxton | 15.81 | 25.44 | SR 22 (Long Plains Road) – Standish, Buxton | |
| Cumberland | Gorham | 20.81 | 33.49 | SR 25 west (Ossipee Trail) – Standish | Southern end of SR 25 concurrency |
| Cumberland | Gorham | 22.51 | 36.23 | SR 25 east (State Street) – Gorham | Roundabout; northern end of SR 25 concurrency |
| Cumberland | Gorham | 23.36– 23.39 | 37.59– 37.64 | US 202 / SR 4 (Narragansett Street) – Gorham, Buxton | Roundabout |
| Cumberland | Gorham | 25.83 | 41.57 | SR 114 (South Street) – Gorham, Scarborough | Roundabout; eastern terminus |
1.000 mi = 1.609 km; 1.000 km = 0.621 mi: Tolled
