= U.S. Route 202 =

Highway in the United States

U.S. Route 202
- US 202 highlighted in red

Route information
- Auxiliary route of US 2
- Length: 629.6 mi (1,013.2 km)
- Existed: 1935–present

Major junctions
- South end: US 13 / US 40 / DE 141 in New Castle, DE
- I-95 from Newport to Wilmington, DE; I-76 in King of Prussia, PA; I-287 in Bridgewater, NJ; I-80 in Parsippany, NJ; I-84 / US 6 in Brewster, NY and Danbury, CT; I-90 / Mass Pike in Westfield, MA; I-91 / US 5 in Holyoke, MA; I-89 in Hopkinton, NH; I-93 / US 4 in Concord, NH; I-95 / Maine Turnpike in Augusta, ME
- East end: I-395 / SR 9 / SR 15 in Bangor, ME

Location
- Country: United States
- States: Delaware, Pennsylvania, New Jersey, New York, Connecticut, Massachusetts, New Hampshire, Maine

Highway system
- United States Numbered Highway System; List; Special; Divided

U.S. Route 202 (US 202) is a spur route of US 2. It follows a northeasterly and southwesterly direction stretching from Delaware in the south to Maine in the north and traveling through the states of Pennsylvania, New Jersey, New York, Connecticut, Massachusetts, and New Hampshire. The highway has borne the number 202 since at least 1936. Before this, sections of the highway were designated U.S. Route 122, as it intersected US 22 in New Jersey. It ends at I-395, SR 9, and SR 15 in Bangor, Maine.

This highway is considerably longer than the eastern segment of US 2 (although considerably shorter than the combined segments of US 2), making it one of several three-digit U.S. highways to be longer than their parent routes.

== Route description ==
Lengths
	mi	km
DE	13.06	21.02
PA	59.002	94.955
NJ	80.31	129.25
NY	55.57	89.43
CT	75.14	120.93
MA	79.6	128.1
NH	95.270	153.322
ME	170.3	274.1
Total	628.252	1,011.074

=== Delaware ===
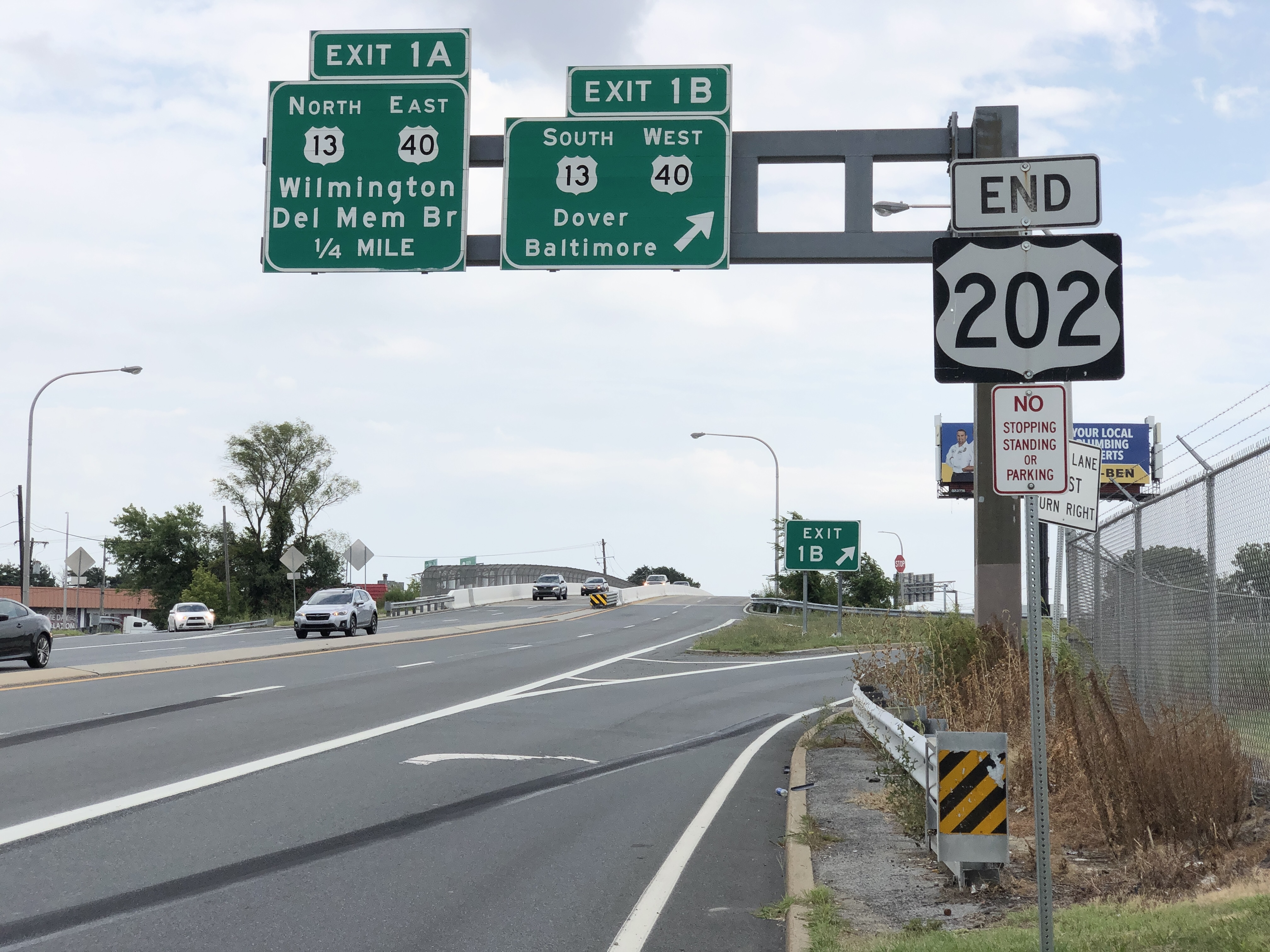
Southern terminus of US 202 in New Castle, Delaware

US 202 begins at an interchange with US 13/US 40 south of Wilmington. It runs north along the same road as Delaware Route 141, then joins with Interstate 95 through Wilmington. North of the city, it exits the freeway onto Concord Pike, heading north; Delaware Route 202 also continues south from this point. US 202 continues north toward the state line as a six-lane arterial road that is lined with numerous strip malls and big-box stores.

=== Pennsylvania ===
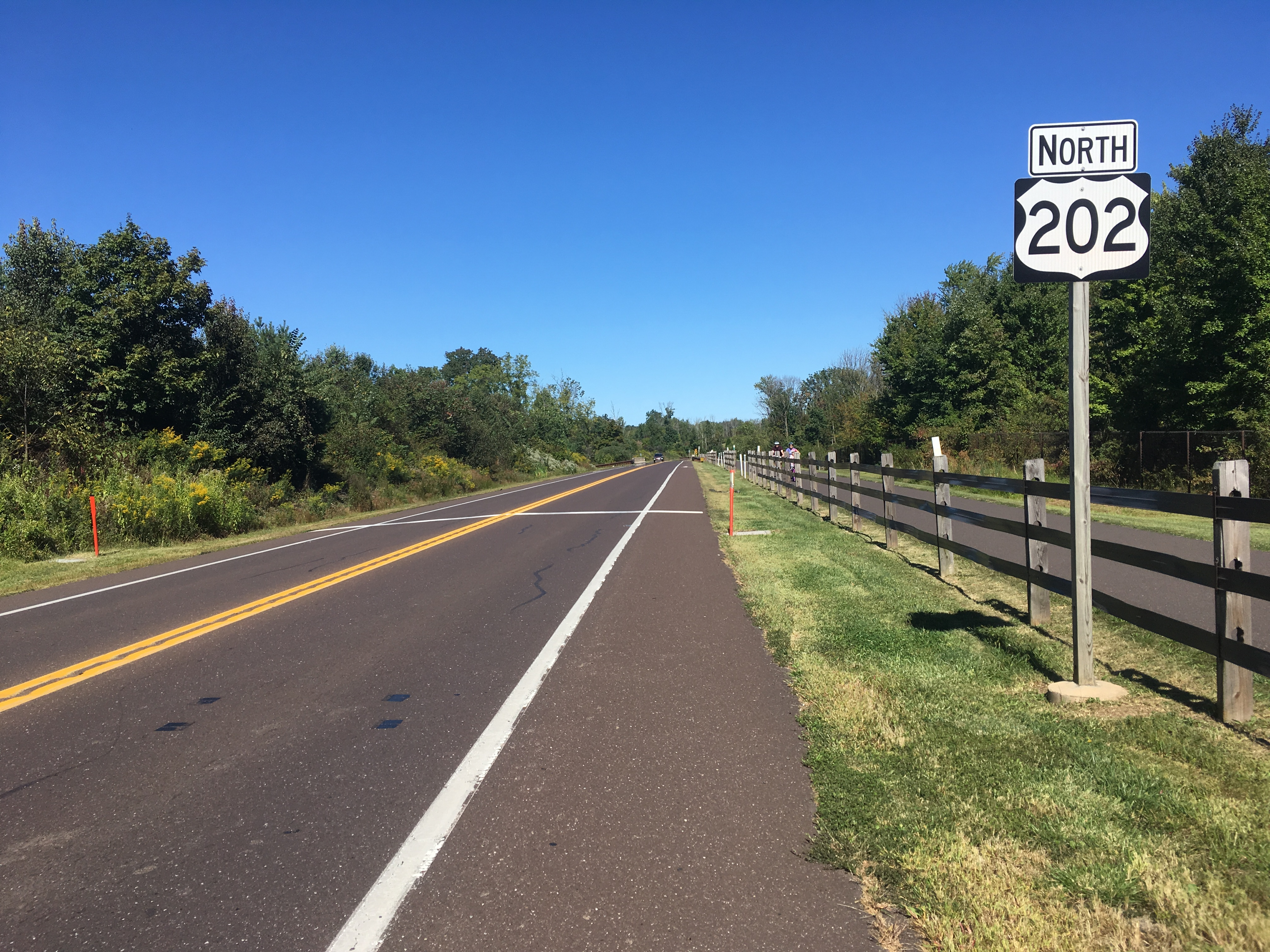
US 202 northbound in Montgomery Township, Pennsylvania

US 202 continues north toward West Chester, joining with US 322 after intersecting U.S. Route 1. South of West Chester, US 202/US 322 exits onto a limited-access bypass of the borough; that is the West Chester Bypass, and includes a grade-level intersection at Matlack Street. North of West Chester, US 322 exits, and US 202 continues north as a freeway towards Frazer, where it interchanges with U.S. Route 30 and bends east to head towards Malvern and King of Prussia. In King of Prussia, the highway forms a large, complicated interchange with the Schuylkill Expressway (Interstate 76), the Pennsylvania Turnpike (Interstate 76/Interstate 276), and U.S. Route 422.

The freeway then transitions into a divided highway, passing the King of Prussia Mall and heading northeast through commercial areas before splitting into a one-way pair through the streets of Bridgeport and Norristown, crossing the Schuylkill River in the process.

North of Norristown, US 202 continues as a two-lane road heading northeast through the Philadelphia suburbs, passing through Blue Bell and Lower Gwynedd, where it becomes a four-lane highway for about two miles (3 km). East of Lansdale, in Montgomeryville, it turns into an expressway-grade parkway with a parallel trail, which opened in December 2012. It continues northeast toward Doylestown, where it joins an older section of bypass at Pennsylvania Route 611 and proceeds north to the old alignment of US 202 (State Street). It continues as a two-lane road to New Hope, crossing the Delaware River on the New Hope-Lambertville Toll Bridge.

=== New Jersey ===
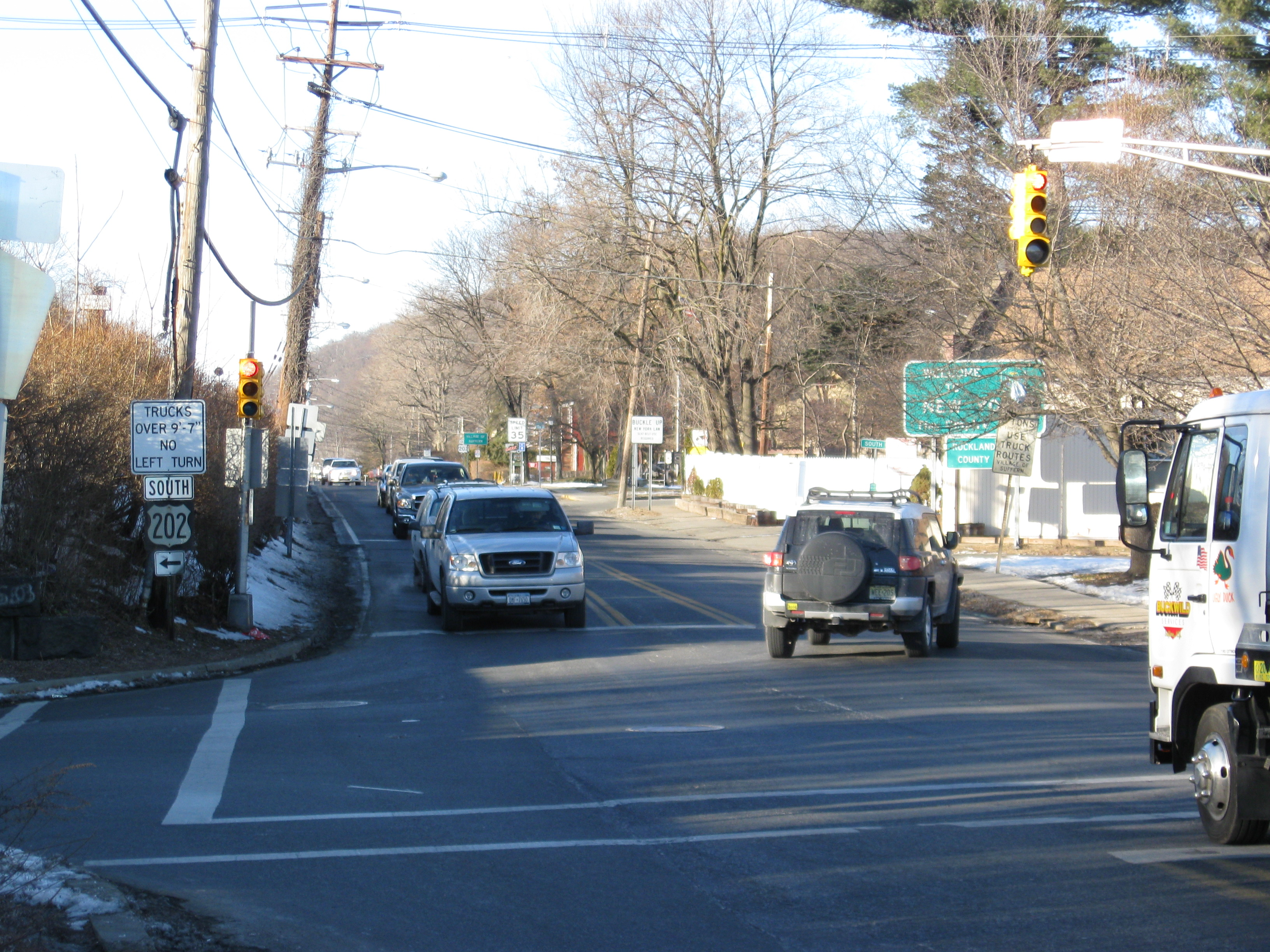
U.S. Route 202 in New Jersey at the New York/New Jersey state line

On the toll bridge, US 202 has two lanes in each direction. It continues a northeasterly course for about 5.7 miles (9.2 km) as a freeway. This segment of US 202 was earlier called the US 202 bypass (as it bypassed the New Hope-Lambertville area) from its original route. The old section of US 202 between New Hope and Ringoes, New Jersey is now Route 179 which is also Old York Road, the first roadway to connect New York City and Philadelphia, Pennsylvania. In 1953, this section of Old York Road was renumbered US 202. A small section of the US 202 bypass was built in 1965 and the old route was renamed Route 179. When the western section of the bypass was built to the Delaware River, the whole former segment was renamed Route 179. The section of the new US 202 freeway section ends once it begins to run concurrently with Route 31 in East Amwell Township. The concurrency runs for five miles (8 km), to Flemington. This stretch, and the 13 miles (21 km) between Flemington and Somerville, is a four-lane divided roadway. In Bridgewater Township, just northwest of Somerville, US 202 has a junction with US 22 towards I-287 South.

At Somerville, the road merges with US 206 at a now-reconfigured Somerville Circle. Parts of the old traffic circle, which also carries Route 28, remain below the US 202 flyover. US 202 splits northeastward from US 206 at Bedminster Township and again becomes a two-lane road.

From here to the state line, US 202 parallels, and has largely been supplanted by, I-287, which during its construction dumped traffic onto US 202. US 202 continues through Morristown to Morris Plains with an intersection with Route 53. With a few exceptions, US 202 is maintained by counties rather than the New Jersey Department of Transportation north of Route 53. The only sections of US 202 in New Jersey north of Route 53 that are state-maintained are at the I-80 interchange, at the US 46 intersection, along the Route 23 concurrency, and at the I-287 interchange in Oakland.

US 202 continues past Boonton along the Boonton Turnpike to historic Mountain View in Wayne, where it then picks up Route 23 for about two miles (3 km) and then exits on Black Oak Ridge Road. It then follows the Paterson-Hamburg Turnpike, Terhune Drive on the east side of Pompton Lake (past the former homes of Cecil B. DeMille and Albert Payson Terhune), and Ramapo Valley Road (more or less paralleling the Ramapo River through Oakland) to Mahwah before crossing the New York state line on the Franklin Turnpike.

=== New York ===
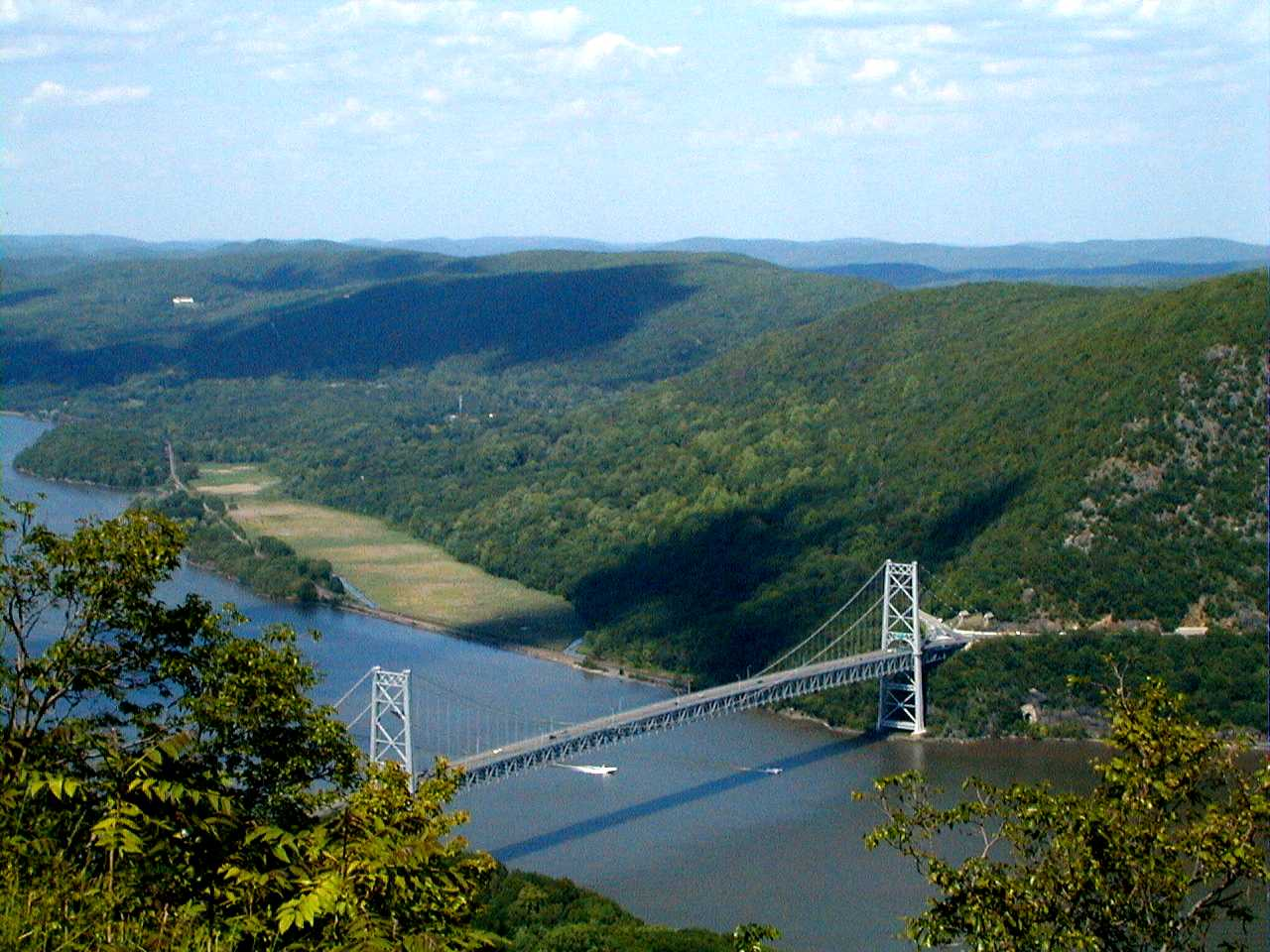
Bear Mountain Bridge seen from Bear Mountain

US 202 is mostly designated east–west in New York, owing to its greater coverage in those directions.

Franklin Turnpike becomes Orange Avenue in Suffern, and US 202 continues to a block-long wrong-way concurrency with NY 59 before tailing off on Wayne Avenue and heading east toward Haverstraw. Most of this stretch is a two-lane road.

At Haverstraw, US 202 makes a sharp left turn north onto US 9W and follows US 9W's path for 13 miles (21 km) towards Bear Mountain and then crosses the Hudson River on the Bear Mountain Bridge, running concurrently with US 6, the Grand Army of the Republic Highway. The two wind around Anthony's Nose, briefly forming New York's only three-way concurrency of U.S. highways with US 9 at Peekskill. Afterwards, the two separate for several miles, with US 202 taking the more southerly route through Somers. The highways reunite at Brewster and become a four-lane road for their last few miles before the state line, taking in NY 121 in the process.

=== Connecticut ===
US 202 is signed east–west in Connecticut. At Danbury, US 6 and 202 climb up onto I-84, which had just been joined by the north–south US 7, making a four-way concurrency. US 7 and 202 split from I-84 and US 6 at Exit 7. It is a two-lane road in southern Brookfield as it follows Federal Road. US 202 diverts from U.S. Route 7 at the next exit to a parallel surface route. The US 7 freeway continues for another 8.5 miles (13.7 km) before it rejoins US 202 at the Brookfield/New Milford town line. The now rejoined US 7 and 202 approach New Milford in bucolic Litchfield County, where they once again split.

US 202 continues through Torrington and on to Cherry Brook, where it then runs concurrently with US 44 for several miles before turning northward at Avon. For the run to the state line, US 202 runs concurrently with Route 10.

=== Massachusetts ===
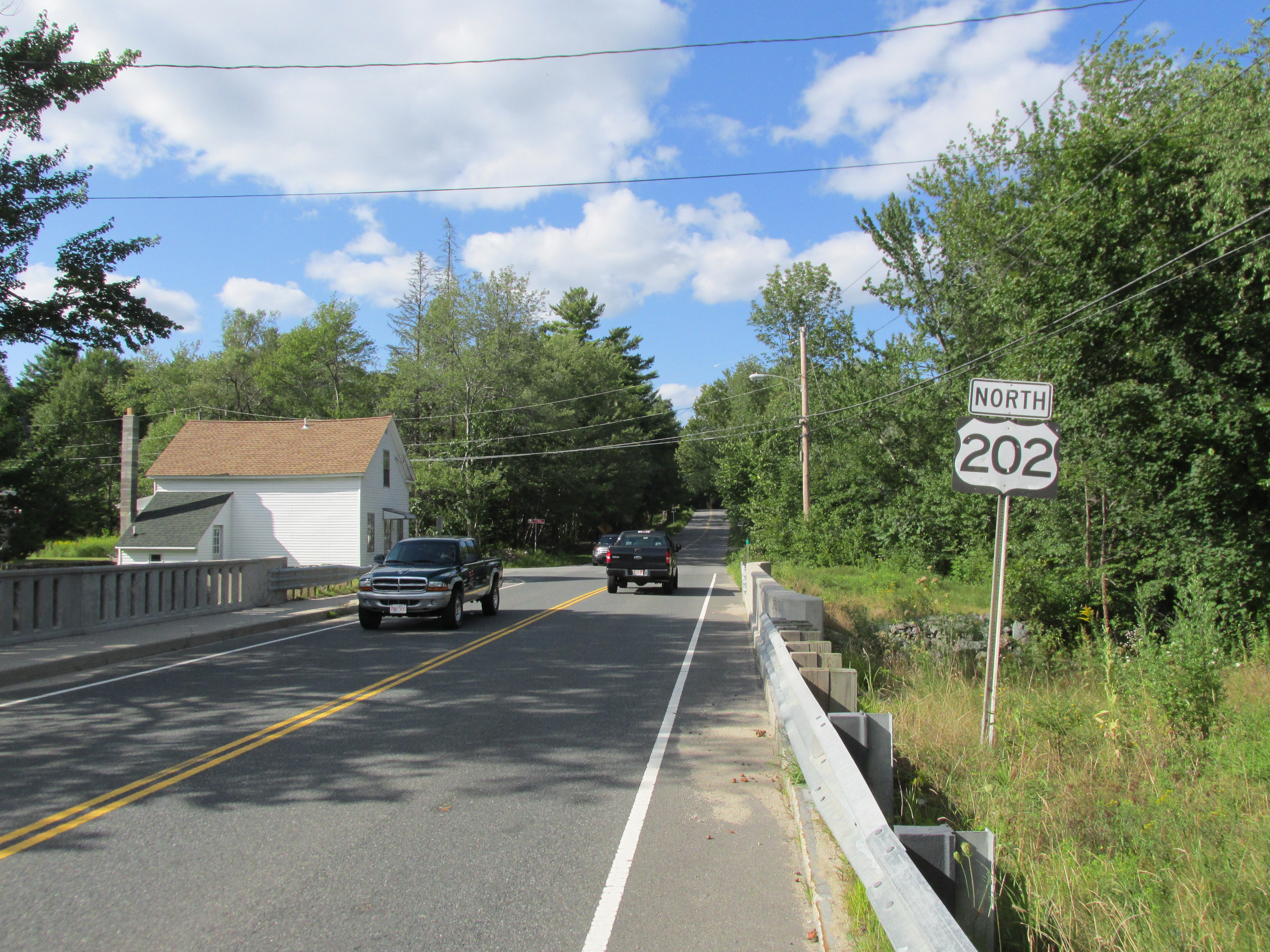
US 202 North in Winchendon Springs, Massachusetts

Unlike elsewhere in New England, US 202 is posted as a north–south highway in Massachusetts, as the highway runs mostly in those directions for its length through the state. US 202 and Route 10 enter the Bay State at the "Southwick Jog" in Southwick, a southward jog in the state line that includes Congamond Lake. North of Westfield, US 202 turns eastward toward Holyoke, crosses the Connecticut River on the Joseph E. Muller Bridge and travels for 1.5 miles as a limited access bypass of South Hadley, traversing MA 116 and MA 33 toward Belchertown. After crossing MA 9, it then heads north along the west side of the Quabbin Reservoir through New Salem toward Athol. This section of US 202 has been dubbed the Daniel Shays Highway, named for a Revolutionary War veteran who led an insurrection against the state government of Massachusetts. US 202 meets Massachusetts Route 2 at Orange, and runs along the two-lane freeway to Phillipston. There, it diverges to the north again as a two-lane road.

In Massachusetts, US 202 passes through the municipalities of Southwick, Westfield, Holyoke, South Hadley, Granby, Belchertown, Pelham, Shutesbury, New Salem, Orange, Athol, Phillipston, Templeton, and Winchendon.

The stretch of highway through Belchertown, Pelham, Shutesbury, and New Salem opened in 1935 to coincide with the completion and opening of the Quabbin Reservoir. The roadway reaches its closest point to the reservoir itself at the crossing of the Swift River, at the Shutesbury/New Salem town line. Access to the west side of the Quabbin Reservation is made through multiple gates in the three towns. There is no public access, however, to the Prescott Peninsula.

=== New Hampshire ===
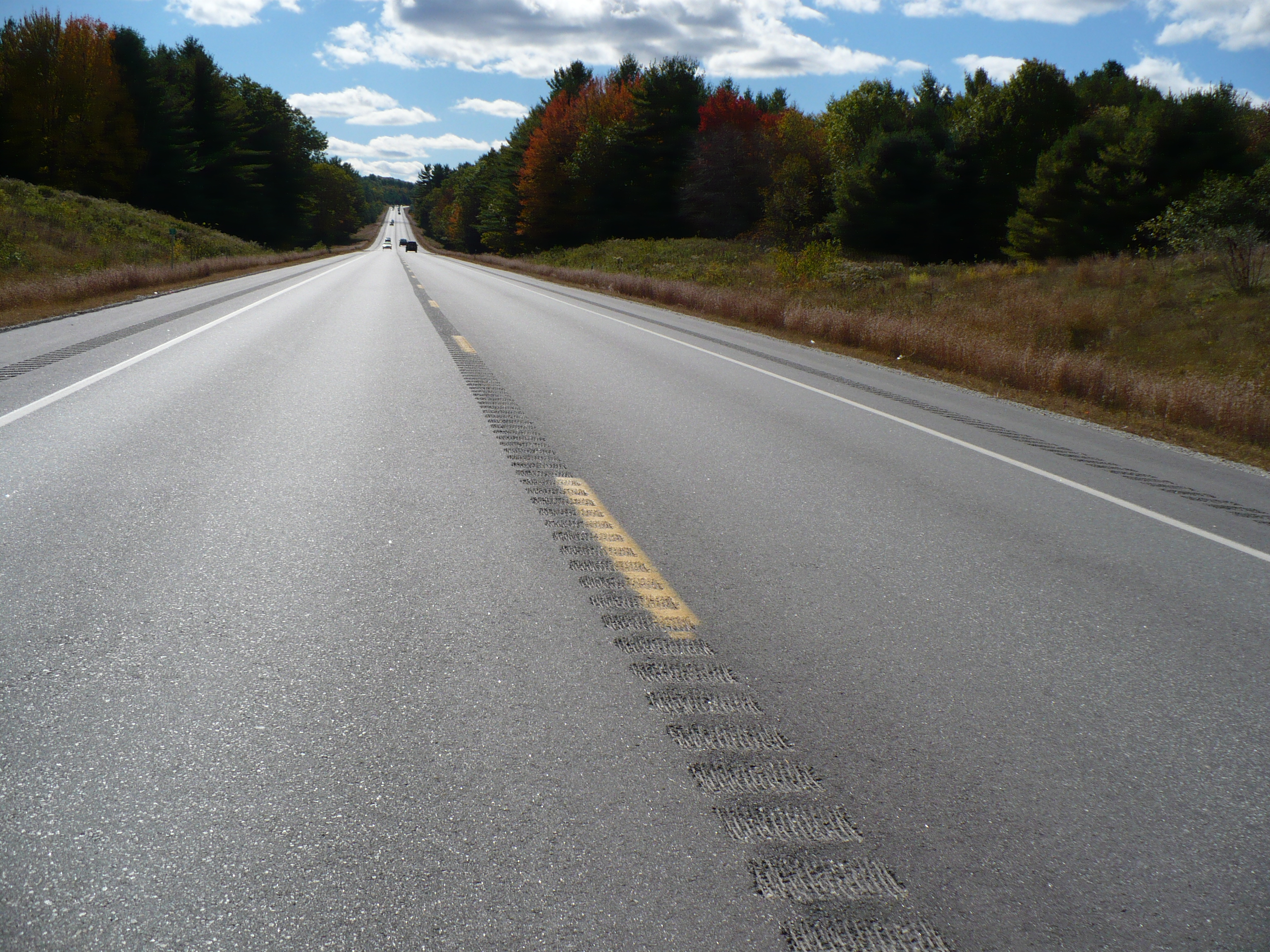
Section of US 202 in Henniker, New Hampshire

US 202 is posted as an east–west highway in New Hampshire. It remains a two-lane highway for most of its length in the Granite State.

It heads north, through Rindge, Jaffrey, and Peterborough, to Hillsborough, where it turns eastward along a concurrency with New Hampshire Route 9. The span of the road between Hillsborough and Hopkinton, which passes through Henniker, is among the most deadly sections of roadway in the state. At Concord, New Hampshire, the state capital, US 202 heads north and picks up a concurrency with US 3 for a short time, and then turns eastward again along Interstate 393, a freeway spur that also carries US 4. The freeway ends short of Chichester, and NH 9 rejoins the two-lane concurrency along with US 4 and 202.

At Northwood, US 4 leaves US 202 heading southeast, and NH 9 splits off a few miles later. US 202 continues alone toward Rochester, where the road jumps up onto the Spaulding Turnpike (NH 16) for a short, non-tolled distance. US 202 leaves the turnpike two miles (3 km) before the state line at East Rochester.

=== Maine ===
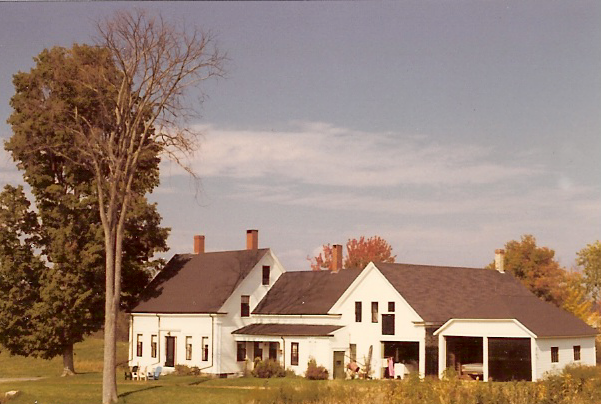
A Connected farm in Windham, Maine, typical of older residences adjacent to US 202 in rural New England.

US 202 is posted as an east–west highway in Maine.

The highway enters the state by crossing the Salmon Falls River at South Lebanon and bridges the Mousam River in Sanford. The highway then passes through Alfred, Waterboro and Hollis before crossing the Saco River at Salmon Falls. The highway passes through Gorham and crosses the Presumpscot River into South Windham. There is a rotary with U.S. Route 302 (US 202's only connection to US 2) at Foster's Corner and an interchange with I-95 at Gray. The highway parallels I-95 through New Gloucester to Auburn and crosses the Androscoggin River into Lewiston, passing near the campus of Bates College. A very short stretch through the latter two cities is four-lane highway, but most of its length in the Pine Tree State consists of two-lane road. Its final miles west of Hampden also include a four-laned segment.

The highway passes through Greene, Monmouth, and Winthrop concurrently with Maine Route 11 and Maine Route 100 and becomes concurrent with State Route 17 at Manchester. US 202 runs concurrently with U.S. Route 201 as it crosses the Kennebec River at Augusta, and shortly thereafter it picks up State Route 3 and State Route 9. US 202 ends at I-395’s exit 2 near Bangor.

== History ==
U.S. Route 122
- Location: Wilmington, DE–Haverstraw, NY
- Existed: 1926–1934

US 122 was created in 1926, connecting US 22 at Whitehouse Station, New Jersey, with US 13 in Wilmington, Delaware. It was extended to Haverstraw, New York in 1931 and became part of US 202 in 1934.

US 202 was approved by the AASHO (now AASHTO) in June 1934; the route approved was 671 miles (1,080 km), from Bangor, Maine, to State Road, Delaware, south of Wilmington. In 1964, the AASHO approved a request by Delaware to eliminate the portion of US 202 between its intersection with I-295 in Farnhurst and State Road; that stretch was carrying US 13/40/301. US 202 was later shortened so that it ended at I-95 just north of Wilmington. Then in 1984, the route numbering committee approved extending US 202 from there to its intersection with US 13/US 40 in Basin Corner, near New Castle. This intersection is US 202's current terminus.

US 202's path passes near the sites of various important Revolutionary War battles in Delaware and Pennsylvania, such as Cooch's Bridge, near Newark, Delaware; Brandywine, near Philadelphia; and Valley Forge. In New Hampshire, US 202 passes by a historical marker in Antrim commemorating the last surviving soldier of the Revolutionary War.

In Pennsylvania in the early 1960s, a four-lane expressway, the Piedmont Expressway, was proposed that would follow the US 202 corridor. The expressway was to be 59 miles (95 km) long, and would cost approximately $146 million. It was to serve as an outer beltway around the Philadelphia area. The project was ultimately cancelled. In its place, the Route 202 Parkway Trail was built. The trail is 9 miles (14 km) in length. The trail is ultimately expected to connect to the East Coast Greenway via the Neshaminy Creek Trail.

Construction began in November 2008 on a parkway project between Pennsylvania Route 63 in Lower Gwynedd and the existing cloverleaf interchange at the US 202 bypass and PA 611 near Doylestown. This parkway was planned to consist of a four-lane stretch between Route 63 and Pennsylvania Route 463 and a two-lane parkway the rest of the way that bypasses the boroughs of Chalfont and New Britain. The parkway opened on December 3, 2012.

US 202 originally ended at its junction with US 2/US 1A in Bangor, Maine. In the late 1980s, however, the section of US 202 between I-395 and US 2 was removed from US 202's official routing. Officially, US 202 ends at I-395's exit 2. However, until at least 2025 signs designating US 202's termination at US 2 in downtown Bangor, at the corner of Main Street and Hammond Street, still stood.

== Major intersections ==
Delaware
US 13 / US 40 in Wilmington Manor
I-295 in Newport
I-95 with a concurrency from Newport to Wilmington
I-495 in Newport

Pennsylvania
US 1 / US 322 in Chadds Ford Township, with a concurrency with US 322 from Chadds Ford Township to West Goshen Township
US 30 in East Whiteland Township
US 422 in Tredyffrin Township
I-76 / I-276 in Upper Merion Township

New Jersey
US 206 with a concurrency from the Raritan–Bridgewater Township line to Bedminster Township
US 22 in Bridgewater Township
I-287 in Bridgewater Township
I-287 in Bedminster Township
I-80 in Parsippany-Troy Hills
US 46 in Parsippany-Troy Hills
I-287 in Parsippany-Troy Hills
I-287 in Boonton
I-287 in Montville
I-287 in Oakland

New York
US 9W with a concurrency from the Village of Haverstraw to Highlands
US 6 with a concurrency from Highlands to Peekskill
US 9 with a concurrency from Cortlandt to Peekskill
US 6 with a concurrency from Brewster to the Connecticut state line in Southeast

Connecticut
US 6 with a concurrency from the New York state line in Danbury through the city
I-84 with a concurrency through Danbury
US 7 with a concurrency from Danbury to New Milford
US 44 with a concurrency from Canton to Avon

Massachusetts, New Hampshire, Maine

State	County	Location	mi	km	Exit	Destinations	Notes
Massachusetts	Hampden	Southwick	0.0	0.0		US 202 south / Route 10 south – Granby Route 10 begins	Continuation into Connecticut
Massachusetts	Hampden	Southwick	1.9	3.1		Route 168 east – Suffield CT, Thompsonville CT	Western terminus of Route 168
Massachusetts	Hampden	Southwick	4.3	6.9		Route 57 west – Granville	Western terminus of Route 57 concurrency
Massachusetts	Hampden	Southwick	4.9	7.9		Route 57 east – Feeding Hills, Springfield	Eastern terminus of Route 57 concurrency
Massachusetts	Hampden	Westfield	9.8	15.8		US 20 east – West Springfield, Springfield	Eastern terminus of US 20 concurrency
Massachusetts	Hampden	Westfield	10.0	16.1		US 20 west – Russell, Pittsfield	Western terminus of US 20 concurrency
Massachusetts	Hampden	Westfield	11.5	18.5		I-90 / Mass Pike – Boston, Albany NY	Exit 41 on I-90 / Mass Pike
Massachusetts	Hampden	Westfield	14.5	23.3		Route 10 north – Northampton, Southampton	Northern terminus of Route 10 concurrency
Massachusetts	Hampden	Holyoke	20.0	32.2		I-91 – Springfield, Hartford, CT, Greenfield, Brattleboro VT	Exit 14 on I-91
Massachusetts	Hampden	Holyoke	20.4	32.8		US 5 – West Springfield, Springfield, Northampton	Southern terminus of concurrency with US 5 southbound only
Massachusetts	Hampden	Holyoke	21.0	33.8		Resnic Boulevard	To I-391
Massachusetts	Hampden	Holyoke	21.2	34.1		Route 141 east – Holyoke Center, Chicopee Falls	Southbound only
Massachusetts	Hampden	Holyoke	21.4	34.4		Route 141 west – Easthampton	Southbound only; to I-91
Massachusetts	Hampden	Holyoke	21.5	34.6		Route 141 – Chicopee Falls	Northbound only
Massachusetts	Hampden	Holyoke	21.6	34.8		US 5 north – Northampton	Northern terminus of concurrency with US 5 southbound only
Massachusetts	Hampden	Holyoke	22.0	35.4		US 202 southbound and northbound come back together	
Massachusetts	Connecticut River		22.1	35.6		Joseph E. Muller Bridge	
Massachusetts	Hampshire	South Hadley	23.3	37.5		Route 116 – South Hadley Falls, Holyoke, South Hadley, Amherst	Interchange
Massachusetts	Hampshire	South Hadley	24.3	39.1		Route 33 to Route 116 – Westover ARB, Chicopee, South Hadley Center	
Massachusetts	Hampshire	Belchertown	33.4	53.8		Route 21 south – Ludlow, Springfield	Southern terminus of Route 21 concurrency
Massachusetts	Hampshire	Belchertown	34.4	55.4		Route 21 north / Route 181 south – Ware, Worcester, Bondsville, Palmer	Northern terminus of Route 21 concurrency; northern terminus of Route 181
Massachusetts	Hampshire	Belchertown	35.3	56.8		Route 9 – Amherst, Northampton, Ware, Worcester	
Massachusetts	Franklin	New Salem	55.1	88.7		Route 122 south – Petersham, Barre, South Athol	Southern terminus of Route 122 concurrency
Massachusetts	Franklin	Orange	56.0	90.1		Route 122 north – Orange Center, Greenfield	Northern terminus of Route 122 concurrency
Massachusetts	Franklin	Orange	57.0	91.7	71	Route 2 west – Greenfield, North Adams	Western terminus of Route 2 concurrency
Massachusetts	Worcester	Athol	61.5	99.0	75	Route 32 – Athol, Petersham	
Massachusetts	Worcester	Phillipston	63.1	101.5	77	Route 2A – Athol, Phillipston	
Massachusetts	Worcester	Phillipston	65.3	105.1	79	Route 2 east / Route 2A west – Fitchburg, Boston, Phillipston	Eastern terminus of Route 2 concurrency; western terminus of Route 2A concurrency
Massachusetts	Worcester	Templeton	66.6	107.2		Route 2A east – Gardner	Eastern terminus of Route 2A concurrency
Massachusetts	Worcester	Templeton	68.3	109.9		Route 68 north – S. Royalston, Royalston	Western terminus of wrong-way concurrency with Route 68
Massachusetts	Worcester	Templeton	69.7	112.2		Route 68 south – Gardner, Worcester	Eastern terminus of wrong-way concurrency with Route 68
Massachusetts	Worcester	Winchendon	75.7	121.8		Route 12 north – Fitzwilliam, NH, Keene, NH	Western terminus of wrong-way concurrency with Route 12
Massachusetts	Worcester	Winchendon	75.9	122.1		Route 12 south to Route 140 – Ashburnham, Fitchburg	Eastern terminus of wrong-way concurrency with Route 12
			79.6 0.000	128.1 0.000	Massachusetts-New Hampshire state line		
New Hampshire	Cheshire	Rindge	3.638	5.855		NH 119 – Fitzwilliam, Rindge	
New Hampshire	Cheshire	Jaffrey	7.491	12.056		NH 124 west – Marlborough NH 137 north – Dublin	Western terminus of NH 124 concurrency; southern terminus of NH 137
New Hampshire	Cheshire	Jaffrey	7.561	12.168		NH 124 east – New Ipswich	Eastern terminus of NH 124 concurrency
New Hampshire	Hillsborough	Peterborough	13.721	22.082		NH 101 west – Keene	Western end of NH 101 concurrency
New Hampshire	Hillsborough	Peterborough	13.918	22.399		NH 101 east / NH 123 south – Manchester	Eastern terminus of NH 101 concurrency; western terminus of NH 123 concurrency
New Hampshire	Hillsborough	Peterborough	16.213	26.092		NH 136 east – Greenfield	Western terminus of NH 136
New Hampshire	Hillsborough	Hancock	19.637	31.603		NH 123 north – Hancock, Stoddard	Eastern terminus of NH 123 concurrency
New Hampshire	Hillsborough	Hancock	23.221	37.371		NH 137 south – Hancock	Northern terminus of NH 137
New Hampshire	Hillsborough	Bennington	24.325	39.147		NH 31 south / NH 47 south – Bennington, Francestown	Western terminus of NH 31 concurrency; northern terminus of NH 47
New Hampshire	Hillsborough	Antrim	26.614	42.831		NH 31 north – Washington, Stoddard	Eastern terminus of NH 31 concurrency
New Hampshire	Hillsborough	Hillsborough	32.679	52.592		NH 149 east – Hillsborough, Deering	Western terminus of NH 149
New Hampshire	Hillsborough	Hillsborough	33.403	53.757		NH 9 west (Franklin Pierce Highway) – Keene	Western terminus of NH 9 concurrency
New Hampshire	Hillsborough	Hillsborough	35.356	56.900		Henniker Street to West Main Street – Hillsborough	Interchange
New Hampshire	Merrimack	Henniker	39.651	63.812		NH 114 – Henniker, Bradford	Interchange
New Hampshire	Merrimack	Hopkinton	43.802	70.492		NH 127 – West Hopkinton, Contoocook	Southern terminus of NH 127
New Hampshire	Merrimack	Hopkinton	44.251	71.215		Hatfield Road / Country Club Road	Interchange
New Hampshire	Merrimack	Hopkinton	47.040– 47.711	75.704– 76.783		I-89 to I-93 / US 4 – Concord, Seacoast, Contoocook, Warner, Lebanon	Exit 5 on I-89; no westbound access to I-89 south
New Hampshire	Merrimack	Hopkinton	48.621	78.248		NH 103 – Contoocook, Warner	Eastern terminus of NH 103
New Hampshire	Merrimack	Hopkinton	49.417	79.529		I-89 south – Bow	Exit 4 on I-89
New Hampshire	Merrimack	Concord	55.936	90.020		NH 13 south (South St.)	Northern terminus of NH 13
New Hampshire	Merrimack	Concord	56.097	90.279		US 3 south (Main St.)	Western terminus of US 3 concurrency
New Hampshire	Merrimack	Concord	56.392	90.754		NH 9 east (Loudon Rd.)	Eastern terminus of NH 9 concurrency
New Hampshire	Merrimack	Concord	56.848	91.488		US 3 north – Penacook	Eastern terminus of US 3 concurrency
New Hampshire	Merrimack	Concord	57.246	92.129		I-93 / US 4 west to I-89 north – Manchester, Lebanon, Plymouth I-393 begins	Western terminus of I-393; western end of concurrency with US 4
New Hampshire	Merrimack	Concord	57.503	92.542	1	Fort Eddy Road – NHTI Community College	
New Hampshire	Merrimack	Concord	57.798	93.017	Veterans Memorial Bridge over the Merrimack River		
New Hampshire	Merrimack	Concord	58.563	94.248	2	NH 132 (East Side Drive) – Concord Heights Business District	
New Hampshire	Merrimack	Concord	60.390	97.188	3	NH 106 – Laconia, Pembroke	
New Hampshire	Merrimack	Pembroke	61.840	99.522		NH 9 west – Concord Heights Business District I-393 ends	Eastern terminus of I-393; western terminus of NH 9 concurrency
New Hampshire	Merrimack	Epsom	66.920	107.697		NH 28 – Pittsfield, Allenstown	Roundabout
New Hampshire	Merrimack	Epsom	70.580	113.587		NH 107 south – Deerfield, Raymond	Western terminus of NH 107 concurrency
New Hampshire	Rockingham	Northwood	72.489	116.660		NH 107 north – Pittsfield	Eastern terminus of NH 107 concurrency
New Hampshire	Rockingham	Northwood	78.333	126.065		US 4 east / NH 43 south – Lee, Durham, Portsmouth, Deerfield, Candia	Eastern terminus of US 4 concurrency; northern terminus of NH 43
New Hampshire	Rockingham	Northwood	78.682	126.626		NH 202A east – Bow Lake, Strafford	Western terminus of NH 202A
New Hampshire	Strafford	Barrington	83.289	134.041		NH 9 east – Barrington, Dover	Eastern terminus of NH 9 concurrency
New Hampshire	Strafford	Barrington	84.001	135.187		NH 126 north – Center Strafford, Barnstead	Western terminus of NH 126 concurrency
New Hampshire	Strafford	Barrington	84.193	135.495		NH 126 south – Barrington, Dover	Eastern terminus of NH 126 concurrency
New Hampshire	Strafford	Rochester	90.161	145.100	13	NH 16 south / Spaulding Turnpike south – Dover, Portsmouth, Boston MA	Western terminus of NH 16 concurrency
New Hampshire	Strafford	Rochester	90.809	146.143	14	Ten Rod Road – Rochester	Eastbound exit and westbound entrance
New Hampshire	Strafford	Rochester	92.020	148.092	15	NH 11 west – Farmington, Alton, Lake Winnipesaukee	Western terminus of NH 11 concurrency
New Hampshire	Strafford	Rochester	92.236	148.439	16	NH 16 north / Spaulding Turnpike north – Ossipee, Conway	Eastern terminus of NH 16 concurrency
New Hampshire	Strafford	Rochester	93.094	149.820		NH 125 – Rochester, Milton	Interchange
			95.270 0.00	153.322 0.00		New Hampshire-Maine state line (eastern terminus of NH 11, southern terminus of SR 11)	
Maine	York	Sanford	9.14	14.71		SR 11A north – Springvale	Southern terminus of SR 11A
Maine	York	Sanford	12.50	20.12		SR 4A south / SR 11 north / SR 109 – Wells, Springvale	Eastern end of concurrency with SR 11; western end of concurrency with SR 4A
Maine	York	Sanford	14.01	22.55		SR 224 west (Shaws Ridge Road) – Shapleigh, Acton	Eastern terminus of SR 224
Maine	York	Alfred	16.41	26.41		SR 4 south / SR 111 east – Biddeford, Lyman, North Berwick SR 4A ends	Northern terminus of SR 4A; western end of concurrency with SR 4; western terminus of SR 111
Maine	York	Waterboro	24.33	39.16		SR 5 north – Limerick	Western end of concurrency with SR 5
Maine	York	Lyman	26.17	42.12		SR 5 south – Saco	Eastern end of concurrency with SR 5
Maine	York	Hollis	29.59	47.62		SR 4A east / SR 35 – Kennebunk, Bar Mills, Standish	Western terminus of SR 4A
Maine	York	Hollis	30.07	48.39		SR 117 north – Limington	Western end of concurrency with SR 117
Maine	York	Buxton	31.80	51.18		SR 117 south – Saco	Eastern end of concurrency with SR 117
Maine	York	Buxton	32.87	52.90		SR 112 – Bar Mills, Saco	
Maine	York	Buxton	33.74	54.30		SR 4A west – Bar Mills	Eastern terminus of SR 4A
Maine	York	Buxton	35.47	57.08		SR 22 – Buxton, South Portland, Scarborough	
Maine	Cumberland	Gorham	38.94	62.67		SR 112 to SR 114 / SR 25 – Scarborough, Standish	Roundabout
Maine	Cumberland	Gorham	39.81	64.07		SR 25 west – Standish	Western end of concurrency with SR 25
Maine	Cumberland	Gorham	40.01	64.39		SR 114 – Scarborough, Sebago Lake	
Maine	Cumberland	Gorham	40.47	65.13		SR 25 east to I-95 – Westbrook	Eastern end of concurrency with SR 25
Maine	Cumberland	Gorham	43.73	70.38		SR 237	Roundabout
Maine	Cumberland	Windham	49.09	79.00		US 302 – Portland, Bridgton	Roundabout
Maine	Cumberland	Gray	52.82	85.01		SR 115 west – North Windham	Western end of concurrency with SR 115
Maine	Cumberland	Gray	56.17	90.40		SR 26A north to SR 26 north – South Paris, Poland Spring, Bethel	Western end of concurrency with SR 26A
Maine	Cumberland	Gray	56.17– 56.44	90.40– 90.83		I-95 / Maine Turnpike – Portland, Augusta	Exit 63 on I-95 / Turnpike
Maine	Cumberland	Gray	56.61	91.10		SR 26 south / SR 100 south / SR 115 east – Portland, Yarmouth	Eastern end of concurrency with SR 115; western end of concurrency with SR 26/SR 100
Maine	Cumberland	Gray	56.66	91.19		SR 26 north – Norway	Eastern end of concurrency with SR 26
Maine	Cumberland	New Gloucester	64.23	103.37		SR 231 south – New Gloucester	Northern terminus of SR 231
Maine	Androscoggin	Auburn	66.88	107.63		SR 122 west – Poland	Eastern terminus of SR 122
Maine	Androscoggin	Auburn	67.89	109.26		I-95 / Maine Turnpike – Portland, Boston, Lewiston, Augusta	Exit 75 on I-95 / Turnpike
Maine	Androscoggin	Auburn	71.93	115.76		SR 11 south / SR 121 south – Minot, Mechanic Falls	Western end of concurrency with SR 11; northern terminus of SR 121
Maine	Androscoggin	Auburn	72.64	116.90		SR 4 north – Turner	Eastern end of concurrency with SR 4
Maine	Androscoggin	Auburn	72.98	117.45		SR 136 south	Northern terminus of SR 136
Maine	Androscoggin	Lewiston	73.34	118.03		SR 196 east to I-95 / Maine Turnpike – Lisbon, Brunswick	Western terminus of SR 196
Maine	Androscoggin	Lewiston	73.57	118.40		SR 126 east – Sabattus	Western terminus of SR 126
Maine	Androscoggin	Lewiston	74.45	119.82		Russell Street	Interchange; to SR 4, SR 126, SR 196
Maine	Androscoggin	Leeds	85.32	137.31		SR 106 north – North Leeds	Southern terminus of SR 106
Maine	Kennebec	Monmouth	89.42	143.91		SR 132 south – Monmouth	Northern terminus of SR 132
Maine	Kennebec	Winthrop	92.58	148.99		SR 41 north / SR 133 north – Winthrop, Readfield, Wayne	Southern terminus of SR 41/SR 133
Maine	Kennebec	Winthrop	95.83	154.22		SR 135 north – Readfield, Belgrade	Western end of concurrency with SR 135
Maine	Kennebec	Winthrop	95.95	154.42		SR 135 south – East Monmouth	Eastern end of concurrency with SR 135
Maine	Kennebec	Manchester	99.15	159.57		SR 17 north – Readfield	Western end of concurrency with SR 17
Maine	Kennebec	Augusta	101.95	164.07		I-95 / Maine Turnpike – Portland, Bangor	Exit 109 on I-95 / Turnpike
Maine	Kennebec	Augusta	103.46	166.50		US 201 south / SR 27 / SR 8 north / SR 11 north / SR 104 north – Gardiner, Belgrade	Roundabout; eastern end of concurrency with SR 11; western end of concurrency with US 201; southern terminus of SR 8/SR 104
Maine	Kennebec	Augusta	104.23	167.74		SR 9 west / SR 17 east (Stone Street) / SR 105 east (Cony Street East) – Randolph, Rockland, Windsor	Roundabout; eastern end of concurrency with SR 17; western end of concurrency with SR 9; western terminus of SR 105
Maine	Kennebec	Augusta	104.85	168.74		US 201 north / SR 100 north – Waterville	Eastern end of concurrency with US 201/SR 100
Maine	Kennebec	Augusta	105.85	170.35		SR 3 west to I-95 – Waterville, Portland	Western end of concurrency with SR 3
Maine	Kennebec	China	115.06	185.17		SR 32 north	Western end of concurrency with SR 32
Maine	Kennebec	China	116.32	187.20		SR 32 south – Windsor	Eastern end of concurrency with SR 32
Maine	Kennebec	China	116.54	187.55		SR 3 east – Belfast	Eastern end of concurrency with SR 3
Maine	Kennebec	China	123.66	199.01		SR 137 west – Winslow	Western end of concurrency with SR 137
Maine	Kennebec	Albion	131.01	210.84		SR 137 east – Freedom	Eastern end of concurrency with SR 137
Maine	Waldo	Unity	137.32	221.00		SR 139 west	Western end of concurrency with SR 139
Maine	Waldo	Unity	137.49	221.27		SR 139 east	Eastern end of concurrency with SR 139
Maine	Waldo	Unity	138.20	222.41		SR 220 south	Western end of concurrency with SR 220
Maine	Waldo	Troy	141.15	227.16		SR 220 north	Eastern end of concurrency with SR 220
Maine	Penobscot	Dixmont	147.86	237.96		SR 7 – Brooks, Newport	
Maine	Penobscot	Dixmont	150.09	241.55		SR 143 north – Etna	Southern terminus of SR 143
Maine	Penobscot	Newburgh	158.50	255.08		SR 69 to I-95 – Carmel, Winterport	
Maine	Penobscot	Hampden	164.61	264.91		SR 9 Bus. east – Hampden	Western terminus of SR 9 Bus.
Maine	Penobscot	Bangor	168.76	271.59		I-395 west / SR 15 north – Orono, Newport I-395 east / SR 9 east / SR 15 south – Bangor, Brewer	Exit 2 on I-395; eastern end of SR 9 concurrency, eastern terminus of US 202
1.000 mi = 1.609 km; 1.000 km = 0.621 mi: Concurrency terminus; Electronic toll collection; Incomplete access

== See also ==
=== Related routes ===
- Special routes of U.S. Route 202
- U.S. Route 2
- U.S. Route 302

Browse numbered routes
← Route 198	MA	→ Route 203
← I-193	NH	→ NH 202A
← US 201	ME	→ SR 203
