= Steep Falls Library =

- U.S. National Register of Historic Places
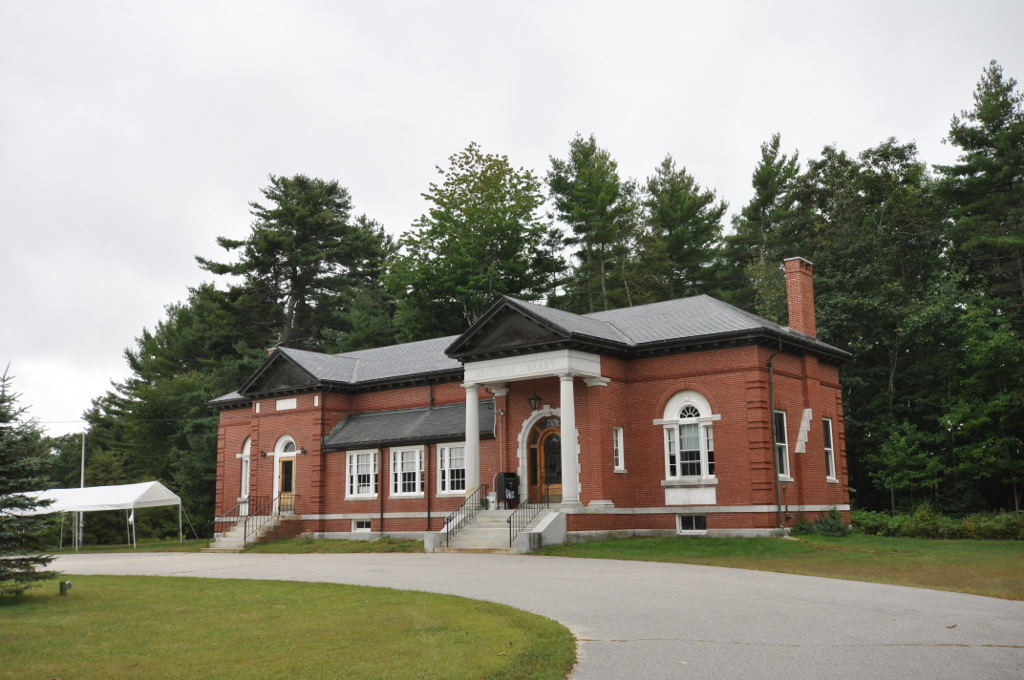

- Location within Maine Location within the United States
- Location: 1128 Pequawket Trail, Steep Falls, Maine
- Coordinates: 43°47′32″N 70°39′3″W
- Area: less than one acre
- Built: 1917
- Architectural style: Classical Revival
- MPS: Maine Public Libraries MPS
- NRHP reference No.: 03001406
- Added to NRHP: January 15, 2004

The Steep Falls Library, also known historically as the Pierce Memorial Library, is a public library in the Steep Falls village in the town of Standish, Maine, USA. Built in 1917 and enlarged in 1924, it was a gift to the community of Henry Pierce, a Standish native who made a business fortune in California. The building, a handsome Colonial Revival structure designed by Edward F. Fassett, was listed on the National Register of Historic Places in 2004.

== Architecture and history ==
The Steep Falls Library stands on the southwest side of Pequawket Trail (Maine State Route 113), south east of its junction with Main Street (Maine State Route 11), at the back of a semicircular drive. It is a single-story brick building, with a hip roof. A pair of gabled entrances project from the front, the right one a gabled porch supported by granite Doric columns, while that on the left is an enclosed vestibule with a simpler entrance. The right entrance is set in a round-arch opening, with a band of windows around the arched door. Between the projecting entrances is a shed-roof projection with three groups of windows, each in narrow-wide-narrow form. Outside the entrances are Palladian windows. The building corners feature brick quoining. The interior of the building retains original Colonial Revival woodwork and decorative elements.

The right half of the library was designed by Edward F. Fassett and was completed in 1917; Fassett died in 1922, and it may have been his last commission. Henry Pierce, who funded its construction, was a Steep Falls native who made a fortune as a businessman selling supplies during the California Gold Rush. The left half of the library, housing the children's room, was added in 1924; it was designed by John Calvin Stevens and his son John Howard Stevens.

Standish's other public library is located in the village of Richville.

== See also ==
- National Register of Historic Places listings in Cumberland County, Maine
