= Maine State Route 22 =

State highway in southwestern Maine, US

State Route 22

Route information
- Maintained by MaineDOT
- Length: 19.48 mi (31.35 km)
- Existed: 1939, 1958 (current alignment)–present

Major junctions
- West end: SR 35 in Buxton
- US 202 / SR 4 in Buxton; I-95 / Maine Turnpike in Portland; SR 9 in Portland; I-295 / US 1 in Portland
- East end: SR 25 / SR 77 in Portland

Location
- Country: United States
- State: Maine
- Counties: York, Cumberland

Highway system
- Maine State Highway System; Interstate; US; State; Auto trails; Lettered highways
← SR 18	→ SR 23

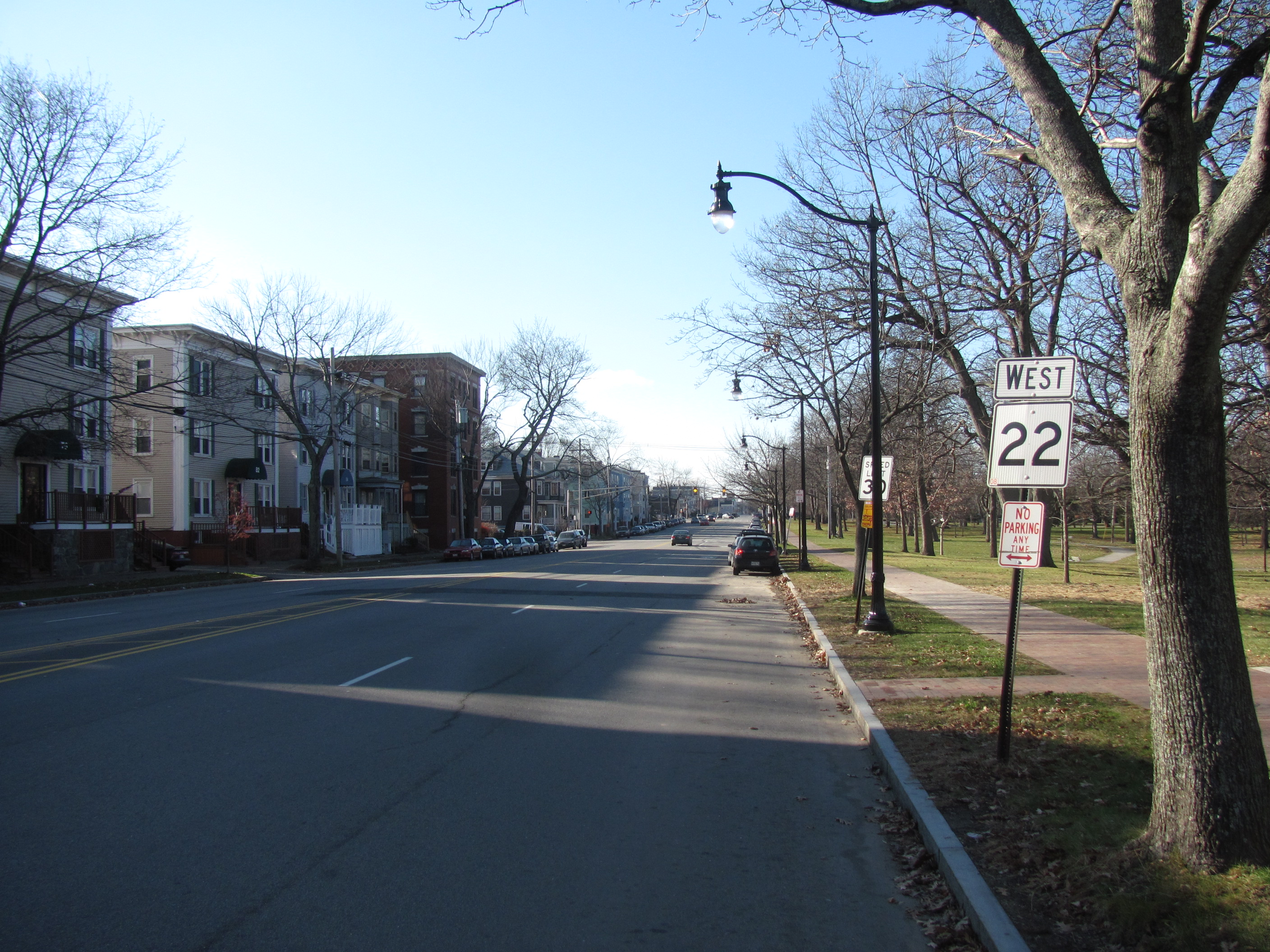
First westbound marker for SR 22, near its eastern terminus at SR 77

State Route 22 (SR 22) is a 19.4-mile (31.2 km) state highway located in southwestern Maine. It serves the western suburbs of Portland, running from SR 35 in Buxton east into the city, where it ends at SR 77.

== Junction list ==
County	Location	mi	km	Destinations	Notes
York	Buxton	0.0	0.0	SR 35 (Bonny Eagle Road) – Standish, Hollis	Western terminus
York	Buxton	1.2	1.9	SR 112 (Parker Farm Road) – Saco, Gorham	
York	Buxton	6.6	10.6	US 202 (Narragansett Trail) / SR 4 – Waterboro, Gorham	
Cumberland	Gorham	11.4	18.3	SR 114 north (South Street) to SR 112 – Gorham	Western end of concurrency with SR 114
Cumberland	Scarborough	12.2	19.6	SR 114 south (Gorham Road) – Scarborough	Eastern end of concurrency with SR 114
Cumberland	Portland	15.6	25.1	Skyway Drive to I-95 / Maine Turnpike	Exit 46 on I-95
Cumberland	Portland	16.3	26.2	SR 9 west (Johnson Road) – Scarborough, Saco	Western end of concurrency with SR 9
Cumberland	Portland	17.9	28.8	SR 9 east (Stevens Avenue) to SR 25 – Falmouth	Eastern end of concurrency with SR 9
Cumberland	Portland	18.5	29.8	I-295 / US 1 – South Portland, Brunswick	Exit 5 on I-295
Cumberland	Portland	19.0	30.6	SR 25 west (Deering Avenue) – Westbrook, Gorham	Western end of silent concurrency with SR 25
Cumberland	Portland	19.4	31.2	SR 77 south (State Street/High Street) / I-295 / US 1 / SR 100 / US 302	Eastern terminus; eastern terminus of SR 25; northern terminus of SR 77
1.000 mi = 1.609 km; 1.000 km = 0.621 mi: Concurrency terminus
