= ME5 =

ME5 or ME-5 may refer to:

- Elfin ME5, a sports racing car
- Maine's 5th congressional district
- Maine State Route 5
