= Maine State Route 5 =

State highway in western Maine, US

State Route 5
- Route of SR 5 highlighted in red

Route information
- Maintained by MaineDOT
- Length: 118.17 mi (190.18 km)
- Existed: 1925–present

Major junctions
- South end: SR 9 in Old Orchard Beach
- I-195 in Saco; US 1 in Saco; US 202 / SR 4 in Waterboro; SR 11 in Limerick; US 302 / SR 113 in Fryeburg; US 2 / SR 26 in Bethel; US 2 in Rumford
- North end: SR 120 in Andover

Location
- Country: United States
- State: Maine
- Counties: York, Cumberland, Oxford

Highway system
- Maine State Highway System; Interstate; US; State; Auto trails; Lettered highways
← SR 4A	→ SR 6

State Route 5 (abbreviated SR 5) is a state highway in Maine that runs from an intersection with State Route 9 in Old Orchard Beach, to an intersection with State Route 120 in Andover.

== Route description ==
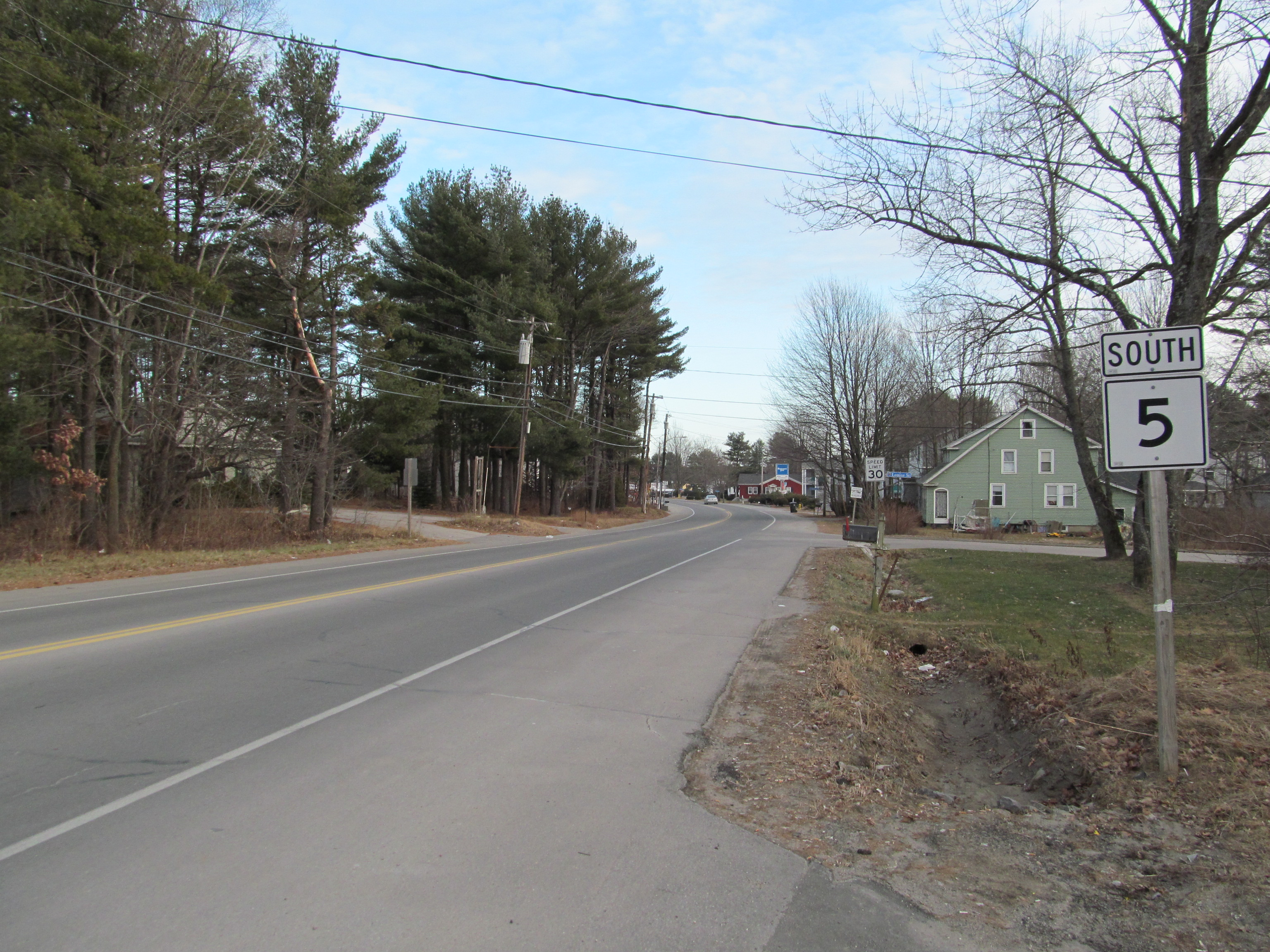
SR 5 southbound in Saco

From its southern terminus near the Pier in Old Orchard Beach, SR 5 leaves the town to the west, going towards the neighboring city of Saco. The route runs northwest from Saco, passes very briefly through a Northwest corner of Biddeford, and intersects US 202 (US 202) near the Lyman-Waterboro line. SR 5 runs concurrently with US 202 for a short distance to East Waterboro.

Between Waterboro and Cornish, SR 5 is known as the Sokokis Trail. North of Cornish, the highway follows the Saco River, crossing it at Hiram, to the town of Fryeburg. SR 5 continues north through Lovell to Bethel, where it intersects US 2. The two routes run together along the Androscoggin River to Rumford Point in the town of Rumford, where SR 5 leaves to the north. It follows parallel to the west bank of the Ellis River to the route's end in Andover.

== History ==
As designated in 1925, SR 5 was a longer route than it is today, originally terminating in South Arm near the southern part of Lower Richardson Lake. In 1980, it was cut back to its current northern terminus in Andover at the intersection with SR 120.

In the early 1980s, Interstate 195 (I-195) was being constructed in Saco, partially over the existing alignment of SR 5. The route was shifted alongside I-195 and partially cosigned with US 1. This remains the routing today.

== Junction list ==
County	Location	mi	km	Destinations	Notes
York	Old Orchard Beach	0.00	0.00	SR 9 (Grand Avenue)	
York	Old Orchard Beach	0.20	0.32	SR 98 west (Portland Avenue) to US 1 – Scarborough	Eastern terminus of SR 98
York	Old Orchard Beach	2.26	3.64	I-195 west to I-95 / US 1 – Saco	Northbound access only to I-195; southern end of northbound concurrency with I-195; eastern terminus of I-195
York	Saco	3.03	4.88	US 1 north (Portland Road) – Saco	Northern end of northbound concurrency with I-195; southern end of wrong-way concurrency with US 1; Exit 2 on I-195
York	Saco	3.27	5.26	I-195 west to I-95 / Maine Turnpike – Portland, Kittery	Northern end of northbound concurrency with I-195; southern end of wrong-way concurrency with US 1; Exit 2 on I-195
York	Saco	4.48	7.21	US 1 south (Elm Street) – Biddeford SR 112 south to SR 9 – Camp Ellis	Northern end of wrong-way concurrency with US 1; southern end of concurrency with SR 112
York	Saco	4.85	7.81	SR 112 north (North Street) – Buxton	Northern end of concurrency with SR 112
York	Dayton	13.38	21.53	SR 35 – Hollis, Lyman	
York	Lyman	16.94	27.26	US 202 east / SR 4 north	Southern end of concurrency with US 202 / SR 4
York	Waterboro	18.78	30.22	US 202 west / SR 4 south – Alfred	Northern end of concurrency with US 202 / SR 4
York	Limerick	28.97	46.62	SR 11 west – Newfield	Southern end of concurrency with SR 11
York	Limerick	29.12	46.86	SR 11 east – Limington	Northern end of concurrency with SR 11
York	Limerick	29.19	46.98	SR 160 north – Parsonsfield	Southern terminus of SR 160
York	Cornish	37.89	60.98	SR 25 west (Maple Street)	Southern end of concurrency with SR 25
York	Cornish	38.56	62.06	SR 25 east (Main Street) – Standish	Northern end of concurrency with SR 25
York	Cornish	38.87	62.56	SR 117 south (Grange Hall Road) – Limington, Standish	Southern end of concurrency with SR 117
Cumberland	Baldwin	40.60	65.34	SR 113 south (Pequawket Trail) – Steep Falls, Standish	Southern end of concurrency with SR 113
Oxford	Hiram	45.26	72.84	SR 117 north (Main Street)	Northern end of concurrency with SR 117
Oxford	Brownfield	51.77	83.32	SR 160 (Depot Street / Main Street) – Denmark, Brownfield	
Oxford	Fryeburg	58.82	94.66	US 302 west / SR 113 north – Conway NH	Northern end of concurrency with SR 113; southern end of concurrency with US 302
Oxford	Fryeburg	59.24	95.34	US 302 east – Sebago Area, Portland	Northern end of concurrency with US 302
Oxford	Lovell	68.39	110.06	SR 93 south – Sweden	Northern terminus of SR 93
Oxford	Albany Township	82.45	132.69	SR 35 south – North Waterford, Norway, Waterford	Southern end of concurrency with SR 35
Oxford	Bethel	95.14	153.11	SR 35 ends US 2 west (West Bethel Road) – Gorham NH, Gilead	Southern end of concurrency with US 2; northern terminus of SR 35
Oxford	Bethel	95.44	153.60	SR 26 south – Bethel, South Paris	Southern end of concurrency with SR 26
Oxford	Bethel	96.04	154.56	Androscoggin River	
Oxford	Newry	101.26	162.96	Bear River	
Oxford	Newry	101.32	163.06	SR 26 north (Bear River Road) – Upton, Errol NH	Northern end of concurrency with SR 26
Oxford	Rumford	107.51	173.02	US 2 east – Rumford	Northern end of concurrency with US 2
Oxford	Andover	118.17	190.18	SR 120 east (Elm Street) – South Arm, Rumford	Western terminus of SR 120
1.000 mi = 1.609 km; 1.000 km = 0.621 mi: Concurrency terminus; Incomplete access

== Former auxiliary route ==
State Route 5A
- Location: Lovell
- Length: 2.1 mi (3.4 km)
- Existed: 1960–2003

State Route 5A was a short 2.1-mile (3.4 km) loop off Route 5 in Lovell. It functioned as an eastern bypass of downtown and connected to SR 5 at both ends. It was designated in 1960 and was removed from the route logs in 2003. It is now an unnumbered road.
