= Maine State Route 25 =

State highway in Maine, US

State Route 25

Route information
- Maintained by MaineDOT
- Length: 42.38 mi (68.20 km)
- Existed: 1926–present

Major junctions
- West end: NH 25 near Freedom, NH
- SR 11 in Limington; US 202 / SR 4 in Gorham; SR 25 Bus. in Westbrook/Portland; I-95 / Maine Turnpike in Portland; SR 9 in Portland
- East end: SR 22 / SR 77 in Portland

Location
- Country: United States
- State: Maine
- Counties: Oxford, York, Cumberland

Highway system
- Maine State Highway System; Interstate; US; State; Auto trails; Lettered highways
← SR 24	→ SR 26
← Route 24	N.E.	→ Route 25A

State Route 25 (SR 25) is part of the system of numbered highways in Maine. It runs for 42.4 miles (68.2 km) across the south central part of the state. SR 25 begins at the New Hampshire border near Porter, where it continues west as New Hampshire Route 25 (NH 25). Its eastern terminus is in downtown Portland at the intersection of Park Avenue and State Street. Administratively, it shares a terminus with SR 22 and SR 77.

== Route description ==
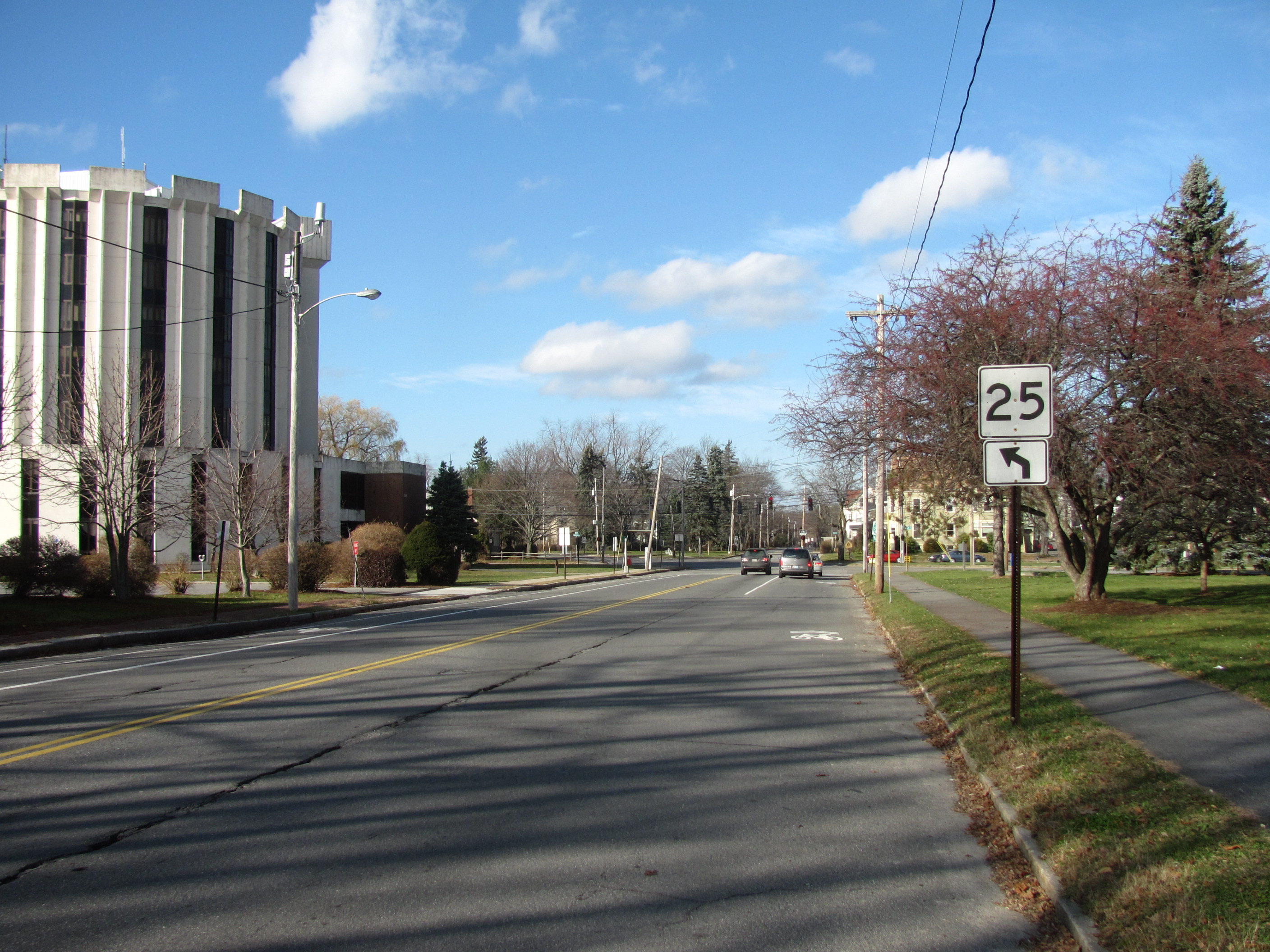
SR 25 westbound in Portland

SR 25 begins west of Porter, where NH 25 crosses the Maine-New Hampshire border. The western part of the highway runs along the Ossipee River on the southern edge of town. SR 25 intersects and overlaps with SR 160 before crossing the river, passing through the extreme northeast corner of Parsonsfield en route to Cornish, where it meets SR 5. On the north side of town, SR 5 and SR 25 have a brief concurrency before meeting SR 117. SR 5 splits off northeast, crossing the Saco River with SR 117 in tow, while SR 25 joins SR 117 south towards Limington. After crossing the town line, SR 117 splits off with SR 25 continuing southeast through town. The highway crosses SR 11 and then over the Saco River into Standish. SR 25 meets the southern terminus of SR 113 and crosses SR 35 before crossing into Gorham. SR 25 overlaps briefly with SR 112 before reaching the town center, where it runs concurrently with US 202 and SR 4, crossing SR 114 in the process.

SR 25 crosses into the city of Westbrook, where it uses Wayside Drive and the Westbrook Arterial to bypass the busy Main Street. SR 25 Business, a former alignment of SR 25, serves this area. The highway crosses into Portland and immediately interchanges with the Maine Turnpike (I-95) at exit 47, thereafter meeting its business route and proceeding into downtown on Brighton Avenue. SR 25 crosses SR 9 (Stevens Avenue), then turns onto Deering Avenue, crossing over I-295/US 1 without an interchange.

The signed eastern terminus of SR 25 is at the end of Deering Avenue at Park Street (SR 22). However, state route logs indicate SR 25 continuing along SR 22 to terminate at State Street (SR 77). Both SR 22 and SR 25 officially terminate at SR 77, but SR 25 is not signed at the intersection.

== History ==
=== Westbrook bypass ===
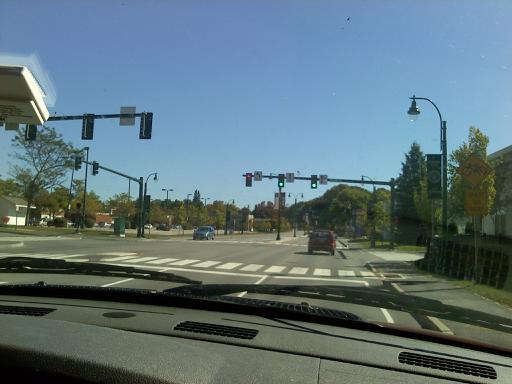
SR 25 eastbound in Westbrook

A bypass of Westbrook, in the form of William Clarke Drive, the Westbrook Arterial and Larrabee Road opened in the late 1970s, with the old alignment via Main Street being designated SR 25 Business. An unnumbered extension of Larrabee Road continues to the north with access to the Maine Turnpike at exit 48. In 2002, the Westbrook Arterial was extended to Rand Road in Portland, passing over the Turnpike with a new direct interchange, exit 47. By 2007, this bypass was designated as part of SR 25, with the vacated alignment along Main Street and Brighton Avenue becoming an easterly extension of SR 25 Business.

=== Eastern terminus in Portland ===
The administrative route log shows the eastern terminus of SR 25 to be at the intersection of Park Avenue and State Street (SR 77). However, signage in the field indicates this intersection to be the eastern terminus of SR 22 instead. Current signage indicates SR 25 ending at SR 22 at the intersection of Deering Avenue and Park Avenue.

== Junction list ==
County	Location	mi	km	Destinations	Notes
Oxford	Porter	0.0	0.0	NH 25 west (Porter Road) to NH 153 – Freedom, Ossipee	Continuation into New Hampshire
Oxford	Porter	3.0	4.8	SR 160 south (North Road) – Parsonsfield, Limerick	Western end of concurrency with SR 160
Oxford	Porter	5.7	9.2	SR 160 north (Bridge Street) – Brownfield, Denmark	Eastern end of concurrency with SR 160
York	Parsonsfield			No major junctions	
York	Cornish	9.7	15.6	SR 5 south (Sokokis Trail North) – Cornish, Limerick	Western end of concurrency with SR 5
York	Cornish	10.6	17.1	SR 5 north to SR 117 north (Cumberland Street) – Hiram, Baldwin	Eastern end of concurrency with SR 5
York	Cornish	10.9	17.5	SR 117 north to SR 5 north – Hiram, Baldwin	Western end of concurrency with SR 117
York	Limington	13.2	21.2	SR 117 south (Cape Road) – Limington, Hollis	Eastern end of concurrency with SR 117
York	Limington	17.8	28.6	SR 11 (Sokokis Avenue) – Baldwin, Limerick	
Cumberland	Standish	22.7	36.5	SR 113 north (Pequawket Trail) – Steep Falls	Southern terminus of SR 113
Cumberland	Standish	24.8	39.9	SR 35 (Northeast Road/Bonny Eagle Road) – Hollis, Windham	
Cumberland	Gorham	28.9	46.5	SR 112 south (Dow Road) – Buxton, Saco	Western end of concurrency with SR 112
Cumberland	Gorham	30.6	49.2	SR 112 north to SR 114 – Scarborough	Eastern end of concurrency with SR 112
Cumberland	Gorham	31.6	50.9	US 202 west / SR 4 south (Narragansett Street) – Buxton, Hollis	Western end of concurrency with US 202 / SR 4
Cumberland	Gorham	31.8	51.2	SR 114 (School Street/South Street) – Scarborough, Standish	
Cumberland	Gorham	32.2	51.8	US 202 east / SR 4 north (Gray Road) – Windham, Gray	Eastern end of concurrency with US 202 / SR 4
Cumberland	Gorham	33.9	54.6	SR 237 north (Mosher Road) to US 202 / SR 4 east – Windham	Southern terminus of SR 237
Cumberland	Westbrook	35.8	57.6	SR 25 Bus. (Main Street) – Westbrook	Western terminus of SR 25 Business
Cumberland	Portland	38.4	61.8	I-95 / Maine Turnpike – Lewiston, Kittery	Exit 47 on I-95 / Turnpike
Cumberland	Portland	39.2	63.1	SR 25 Bus. (Main Street) – Westbrook	Eastern terminus of SR 25 Business
Cumberland	Portland	40.6	65.3	SR 9 (Stevens Avenue) – South Portland, Falmouth	
Cumberland	Portland	41.9	67.4	SR 22 west (Park Avenue) – Scarborough, Buxton	Signed eastern terminus; western end of silent concurrency with SR 22
Cumberland	Portland	42.2	67.9	SR 77 south (State Street/High Street) to I-295 / US 1 / SR 100 / US 302 – South Portland, Cape Elizabeth	Eastern terminus; eastern terminus of SR 22; northern terminus of SR 77
1.000 mi = 1.609 km; 1.000 km = 0.621 mi: Concurrency terminus

== Business route ==
State Route 25 Business
- Location: Westbrook–Portland
- Length: 2.8 mi (4.5 km)
- Existed: 1970s–present

State Route 25 Business (SR 25 Bus.), internally designated State Route 25C, is a business route of SR 25, running 2.8 miles (4.5 km) through downtown Westbrook and into Portland. It is a former routing of SR 25, which it connects to at both ends.

SR 25 Business begins at the intersection of William Clarke Drive (SR 25), Main Street, and New Gorham Road in Westbrook. The two routes run parallel to one another for about a mile, with SR 25 running on William Clarke Drive and SR 25 Business running on Main Street. The routes continue this way until reaching the Westbrook Arterial, which SR 25 turns onto to bypass the city to the south, towards the Maine Turnpike. SR 25 Business continues through Westbrook along Main Street, turning southeast to continue on Main Street in the middle of the city.

Larrabee Road, which used to carry SR 25, provides access to the Turnpike at exit 48. Until the Westbrook Arterial was extended to Rand Road in 2007 (and SR 25 moved onto the new alignment), this intersection was the eastern terminus of the business route. SR 25 Business was then extended by 0.7 miles (1.1 km) into Portland, crossing over the Turnpike and becoming Brighton Avenue before rejoining SR 25, which approaches from the south to resume its original alignment through downtown Portland.

== See also ==
- New England Route 25
