= Gorham, Maine =

Town in Maine, United States

- Town
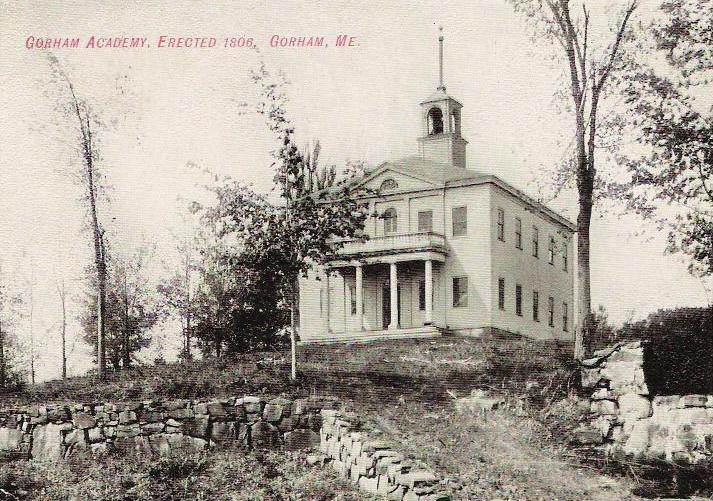
- Gorham Academy Building, c. 1906

- Seal
- Motto: "Grow with Us"
- Location in Cumberland County and the state of Maine.
- Coordinates: 43°43′17″N 70°27′28″W
- Country: United States
- State: Maine
- County: Cumberland
- Settled: 1736
- Incorporated: October 30, 1764
- Villages: Gorham; Babb Corner; Dog Corner; Gag Corner; Little Falls; Mosher Corner; North Gorham; South Gorham; West Gorham; White Rock

Area
  - Total: 51.29 sq mi (132.84 km^{2})
  - Land: 50.62 sq mi (131.11 km^{2})
  - Water: 0.67 sq mi (1.74 km^{2})
- Elevation: 203 ft (62 m)

Population (2020)
  - Total: 18,336
  - Density: 362/sq mi (139.9/km^{2})
- Demonym: Gorhamite
- Time zone: UTC-5 (Eastern (EST))
  - Summer (DST): UTC-4 (EDT)
- ZIP code: 04038
- Area code: 207
- FIPS code: 23-28240
- GNIS feature ID: 582493
- Website: www.gorhammaine.gov

Gorham is a town in Cumberland County, Maine, United States. The population was 18,336 at the 2020 United States census. In addition to its urban village center known as Gorham Village or simply "the Village," the town encompasses a number of smaller, unincorporated villages and hamlets with distinct historical identities, including South Gorham, West Gorham, Little Falls, White Rock, and North Gorham. Gorham is home to one of the three campuses of the University of Southern Maine. In 2013, Gorham was voted second-best town in Maine after Hampden by a financial website.

Gorham is part of the Portland-South Portland-Biddeford metropolitan area.

Initially named Narragansett Number 7, the village was renamed Gorhamtown Plantation in honor of the famous New England Ranger John Gorham I, the great grandfather of John Gorham 4th.

== History ==
First called Narragansett Number 7, it was one of seven townships granted by the Massachusetts General Court to soldiers (or their heirs) who had fought in the Narragansett War of 1675, also called King Philip's War. The land was first settled in 1736 by Captain John Phinney and his family, followed in 1738 by Hugh McLellan and Daniel Mosher. By 1743, the first sawmill was established by John Gorham at Little River. Without window-glass, the first dwellings were constructed of logs chinked with moss and clay.

The town was incorporated as Gorham in 1764. It would annex land from Standish in 1831 and 1839, and from Scarborough in 1864.

Good soil benefited agriculture, and numerous falls provided water power for industry. The town developed into a manufacturing center, with Portland serving as a nearby market. Products produced there included textiles, clothing, carpet, lumber, barrels, chairmans, carriages, wagons and sleighs. There was also a box factory, corn-canning factory, paper pulp mill, brickyard, tannery, and granite and marble works.

The Cumberland and Oxford Canal opened in 1829 connecting Casco Bay with Sebago Lake, although it would be discontinued in 1871, having been rendered obsolete by John A. Poor's York and Cumberland Railroad (later the Boston and Maine Railroad), which entered Gorham in 1851. The railroad was dismantled in 1961, but the former grade serves as a multi-use recreational trail. On September 12, 1870, the first train of the Portland and Ogdensburg Railroad (later part of the Maine Central Railroad Mountain Division) traveled from Portland to Sebago Lake through White Rock. White Rock station closed in 1921.

In 1803, Gorham Academy was founded. Designed by Samuel Elder, the Federal style Gorham Academy Building was erected in 1806. The institution would evolve into Western Maine Normal School, and later Gorham State Teachers College. Today, it is the University of Southern Maine at Gorham.

Gorham currently has a much smaller industrial infrastructure than it did in earlier years. The majority of Gorham's industry is based along its border with Westbrook, and many of the mills that formerly existed along the Presumpscot River are now underwater, flooded with the construction of the Dundee Dam. In recent decades Gorham has increased in popularity as a bedroom community of Portland. Its residents and town officials have been confronted with various issues related to managing suburban growth in a historically rural town. Today, Gorham has grown from a small village to a flourishing town. Its popularity has attracted many new housing developments and businesses. Positioned near Sebago Lake, Gorham also offers a plethora of recreational activities such as trails for hiking and a river for kayaking, canoeing and swimming.

== Gallery ==
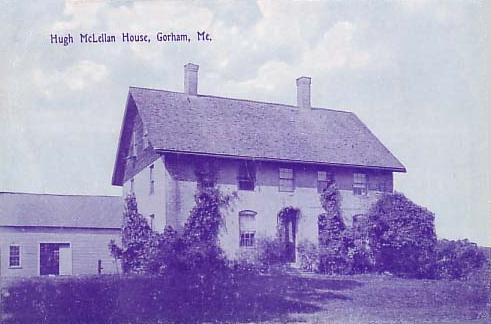
Hugh McLellan House, completed in 1773

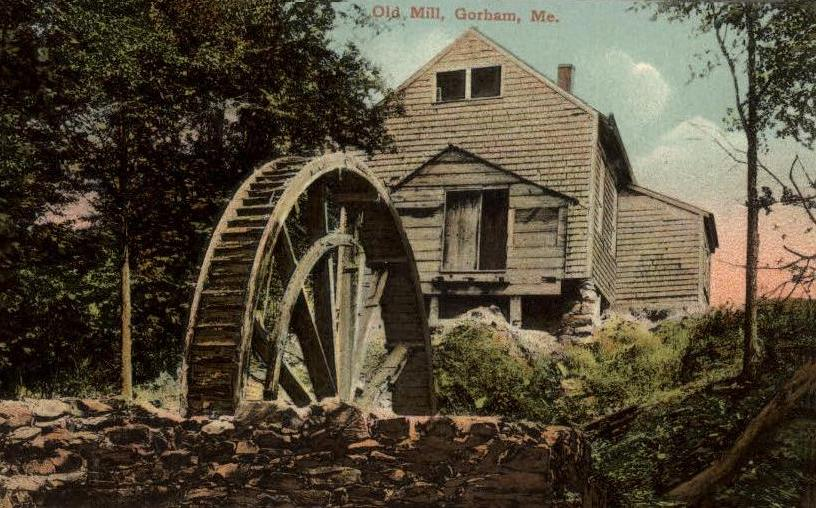
Old mill in 1906

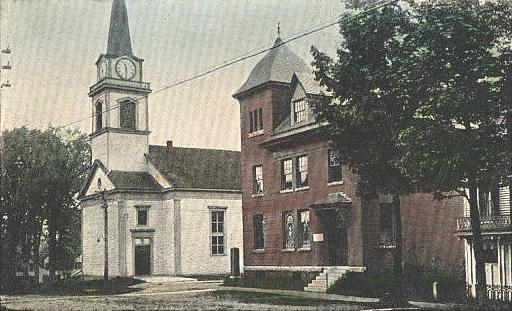
Congregational Church c. 1915

== Geography ==
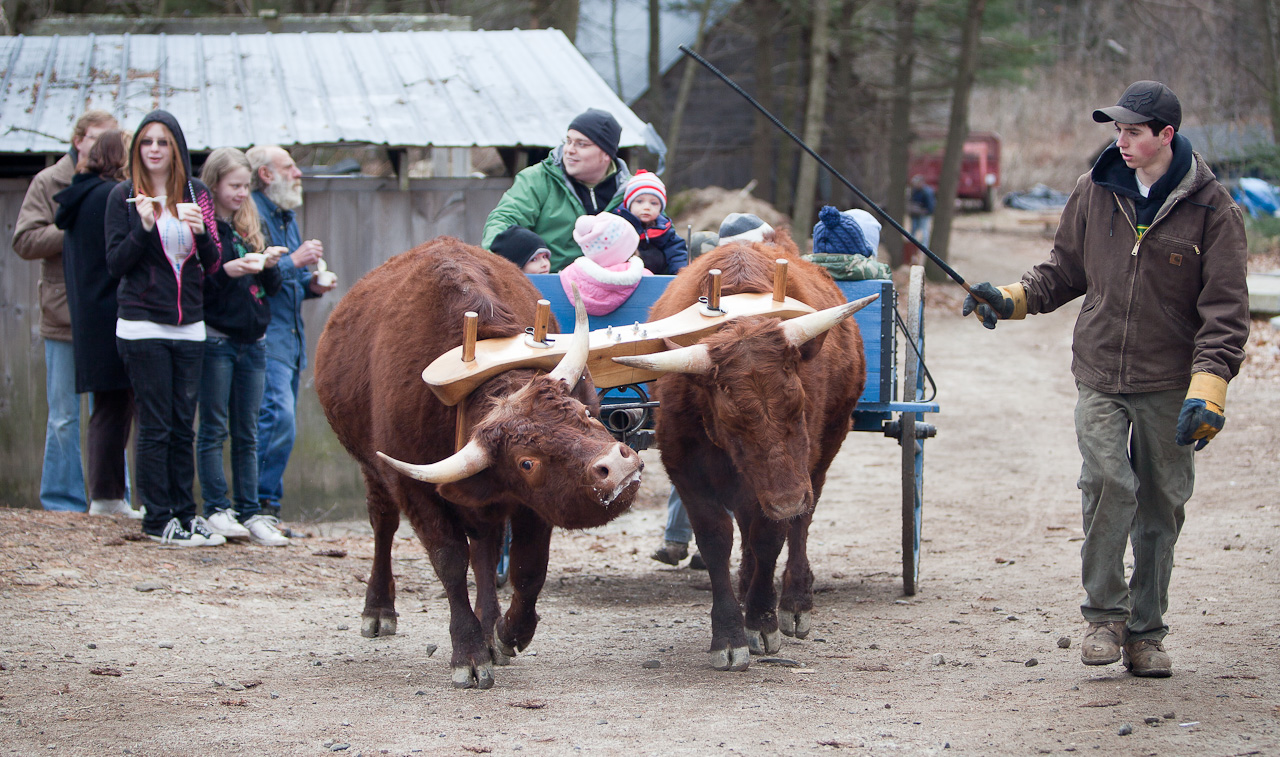
Ox cart at Merrifield Farm

According to the United States Census Bureau, the town has a total area of 51.29 square miles (132.84 km^{2}), of which 50.62 square miles (131.11 km^{2}) is land and 0.67 square miles (1.74 km^{2}) is water. Gorham is drained by the Little River, Presumpscot River and Stroudwater River.

=== Roads and adjacent communities ===
The town is served by U.S. Route 202, and state routes 4, 22, 25, 112, 114 and 237. It borders Buxton, Standish, Windham, Westbrook, and Scarborough.

== Demographics ==
Historical population
Census	Pop.	Note	%±
1800	2,503		—
1810	2,632		5.2%
1820	2,795		6.2%
1830	2,988		6.9%
1840	3,001		0.4%
1850	3,088		2.9%
1860	3,252		5.3%
1870	3,351		3.0%
1880	3,233		−3.5%
1890	2,888		−10.7%
1900	2,540		−12.0%
1910	2,822		11.1%
1920	2,870		1.7%
1930	3,035		5.7%
1940	3,494		15.1%
1950	4,742		35.7%
1960	5,767		21.6%
1970	7,839		35.9%
1980	10,101		28.9%
1990	11,856		17.4%
2000	14,141		19.3%
2010	16,381		15.8%
2020	18,336		11.9%
U.S. Decennial Census

=== 2010 census ===
As of the census of 2010, there were 16,381 people, 5,719 households, and 4,064 families living in the town. The population density was 323.6 inhabitants per square mile (124.9/km^{2}). There were 5,972 housing units at an average density of 118.0 per square mile (45.6/km^{2}). The racial makeup of the town was 96.5% White, 0.7% African American, 0.3% Native American, 0.9% Asian, 0.2% from other races, and 1.4% from two or more races. Hispanic or Latino of any race were 0.9% of the population.

There were 5,719 households, of which 36.0% had children under the age of 18 living with them, 57.1% were married couples living together, 9.9% had a female householder with no husband present, 4.0% had a male householder with no wife present, and 28.9% were non-families. 21.8% of all households were made up of individuals, and 9% had someone living alone who was 65 years of age or older. The average household size was 2.59 and the average family size was 3.03.

The median age in the town was 38 years. 22.6% of residents were under the age of 18; 15% were between the ages of 18 and 24; 22.8% were from 25 to 44; 27.8% were from 45 to 64; and 11.9% were 65 years of age or older. The gender makeup of the town was 48.3% male and 51.7% female.

=== 2000 census ===
As of the census of 2000, there were 14,141 people, 4,875 households, and 3,529 families living in the town. The population density was 279.2 inhabitants per square mile (107.8/km^{2}). There were 5,051 housing units at an average density of 99.7 per square mile (38.5/km^{2}). The racial makeup of the town was 97.57% White, 0.42% Black or African American, 0.33% Native American, 0.64% Asian, 0.01% Pacific Islander, 0.17% from other races, and 0.87% from two or more races. Hispanic or Latino of any race were 0.60% of the population.

There were 4,875 households, out of which 38.7% had children under the age of 18 living with them, 59.2% were married couples living together, 10.0% had a female householder with no husband present, and 27.6% were non-families. 20.5% of all households were made up of individuals, and 8.3% had someone living alone who was 65 years of age or older. The average household size was 2.67 and the average family size was 3.11.

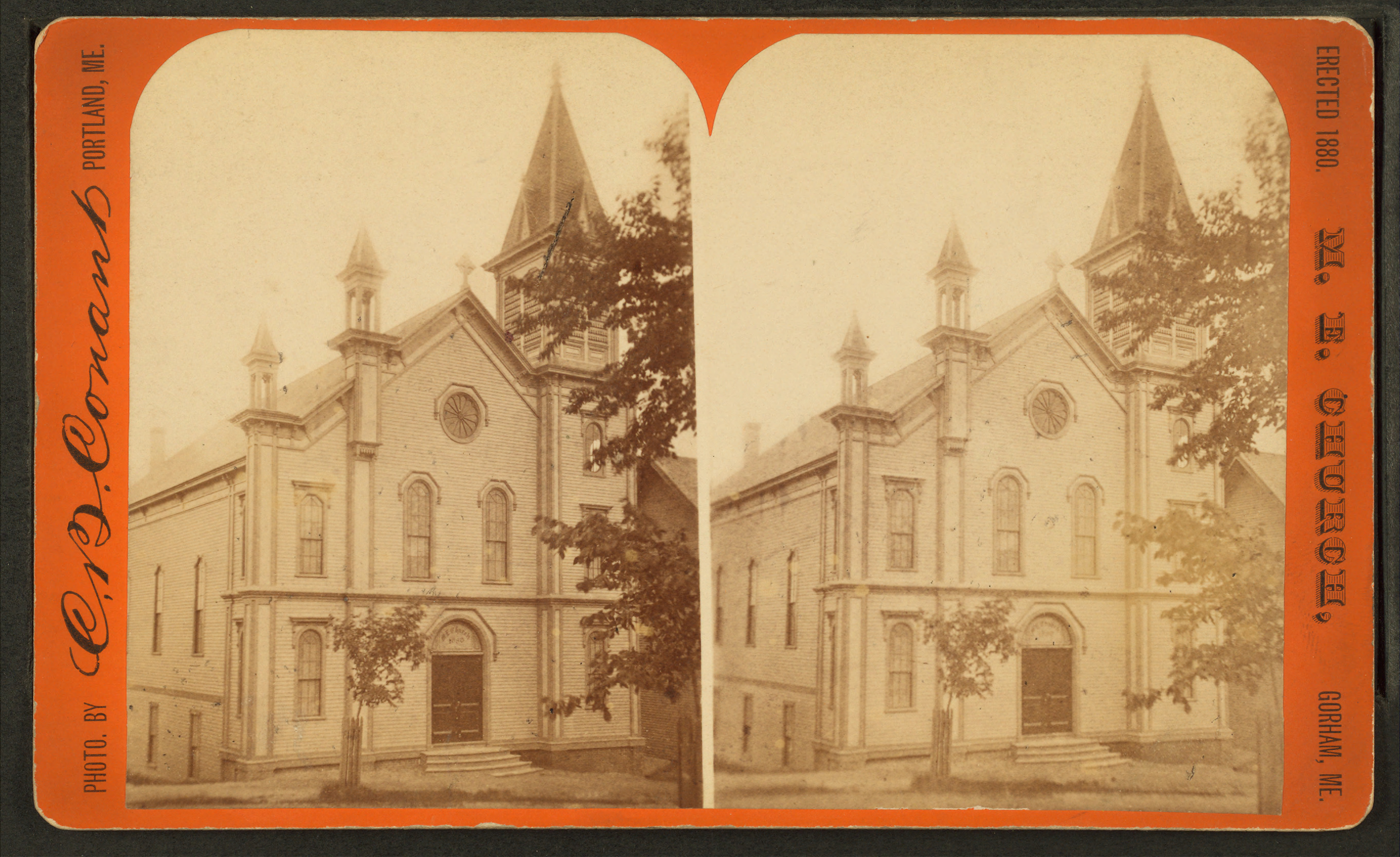
M. E. Church – erected in 1880

In the town, the population was spread out, with 25.9% under the age of 18, 13.7% from 18 to 24, 28.9% from 25 to 44, 21.5% from 45 to 64, and 10.0% who were 65 years of age or older. The median age was 34 years. For every 100 females, there were 93.8 males. For every 100 females age 18 and over, there were 90.2 males.

The median income for a household in the town was $50,316, and the median income for a family was $55,434. Males had a median income of $37,828 versus $30,394 for females. The per capita income for the town was $21,174. About 5.1% of families and 7.4% of the population were below the poverty line, including 9.7% of those under age 18 and 6.7% of those age 65 or over.

== Education ==
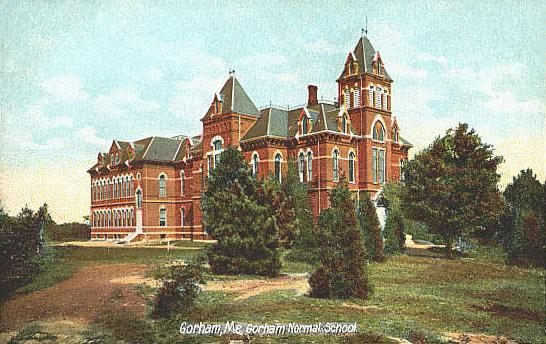
Corthell Hall at U.S.M., built in 1878, designed by the noted Portland architect Francis H. Fassett, c. 1904

Schools in Gorham are part of the Gorham School District. Heather Perry is the Superintendent.

The school district has three elementary schools (Village, Great Falls, and Narragansett), a middle school and a high school. For the 2011 to 2012 school year, the district had approximately 2,698 students enrolled.

The University of Southern Maine has a campus in Gorham, which is home to most of the University's dormitories and athletic facilities.

== Notable people ==
- Wendell Abraham Anderson, politician
- James Phinney Baxter, historian, civic leader
- Percival Baxter, 53rd governor of Maine
- James Boyle, state legislator
- Joseph Brackett, elder in Shakers sect and songwriter
- Bob Crowley, winner of Survivor: Gabon
- Hiram Edson, a pioneer of the Seventh-day Adventist Church
- Edwin Hall, physicist
- Isaiah H. Hedge, MD, abolitionist, early donor to Bates College
- Mackenzie Holmes, women's basketball player
- Charles Davis Jameson, lumberman, general
- Stephen Longfellow, US congressman
- James Mann, US congressman
- Peter Mills, former member of the Maine state Senate
- Kim Moody, long-distance runner
- Shawn Moody, 2018 candidate for Governor of Maine
- Josiah Pierce, Maine state senator and lawyer
- Rodney S. Quinn, Secretary of State of Maine (1979–1988)
- Frederick Robie, 39th governor of Maine
- Linda Sanborn, state legislator
- Donald F. Snow, US congressman
- Ellen G. White, co-founder of the Seventh-day Adventist Church
- Horace Wilson, professor and baseball promoter
- Eric Saindon, VFX supervisor

== See also ==
- Gorham High School (Maine)
