= Standish, Maine =

Town in Maine, United States

- Town
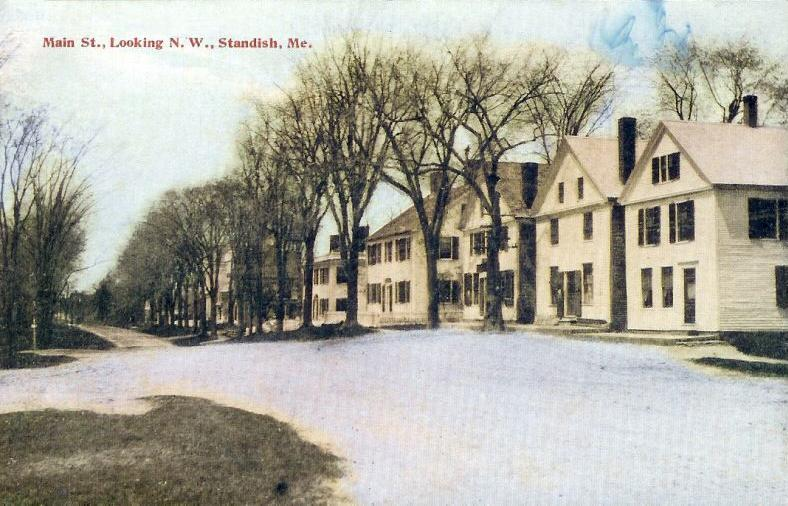
- View of Standish c. 1910

- Seal

- Location in Cumberland County and the state of Maine
- Coordinates: 43°46′42″N 70°34′50″W
- Country: United States
- State: Maine
- County: Cumberland
- Incorporated: November 30, 1785
- Named for: Myles Standish
- Villages: Standish; Elmwood; Harmon Beach; Richville; Sebago Lake; Steep Falls; Wards Cove

Area
  - Total: 80.59 sq mi (208.73 km^{2})
  - Land: 59.03 sq mi (152.89 km^{2})
  - Water: 21.56 sq mi (55.84 km^{2})
- Elevation: 315 ft (96 m)

Population (2020)
  - Total: 10,244
  - Density: 170/sq mi (67/km^{2})
- Time zone: UTC-5 (Eastern (EST))
  - Summer (DST): UTC-4 (EDT)
- ZIP Codes: 04084 (Standish); 04085 (Steep Falls)
- Area code: 207
- FIPS code: 23-73670
- GNIS feature ID: 582744
- Website: www.standish.org

Standish is a town in Cumberland County, Maine, United States. The population was 10,244 at the 2020 census. It includes the villages of Standish Corner, Sebago Lake Village and Steep Falls, and the localities known as Richville, Elmwood, Standish Neck and Two Trails. Standish is part of the Portland-South Portland-Biddeford metropolitan area.

== History ==
This was once hunting and fishing territory of the Abenaki tribe, whose main village was at Pequawket (now Fryeburg) up the Pequawket Trail (now Route 113). In 1750, the Massachusetts General Court granted the township to Captain Moses Pearson and Captain Humphrey Hobbs, together with their respective companies, for services during the French and Indian Wars.

It was to be called Pearson and Hobbs Town, but Hobbs died and none of his company took possession. In 1752, the land was surveyed and divided into 30-acre (120,000 m^{2}) lots, although some soldiers sold their rights for whatever they could get. Those that did settle found their cabins razed by Indians trying to drive them away. In response, the veterans built at Standish Corner a stockaded fort, which provided protection until Indian hostilities ceased in 1759 with the Fall of Quebec. Pearsontown Plantation was incorporated as Standish on November 30, 1785. The town is named in honor of Captain Myles Standish.

Much of Standish is sandy plains covered with pine, yet farmers found considerable arable land. Watermills at various streams produced lumber, headings, shooks, barrel staves, carriages, clothing, flour, ice, plaster and packing boxes. The Cumberland and Oxford Canal opened in 1832, increasing trade between Sebago Lake and Portland. It was followed by the Portland and Ogdensburg Railroad, which on September 12, 1870, began regular passenger service between Portland and Sebago Lake Station. Tourists could arrive by train in the morning, ride a side-wheel steamboat the whole length of the lakes, then return to the city by evening. The cost of the excursion in 1876 was $1.75 from Portland to Naples, and $2.00 from Portland to Bridgton, North Bridgton or Harrison. Standish also had railroad depots at Richville and Steep Falls. In 1998, Frye Island in Sebago Lake was set off and incorporated as a separate town. Today, Standish is both a recreational area and suburb of Portland.

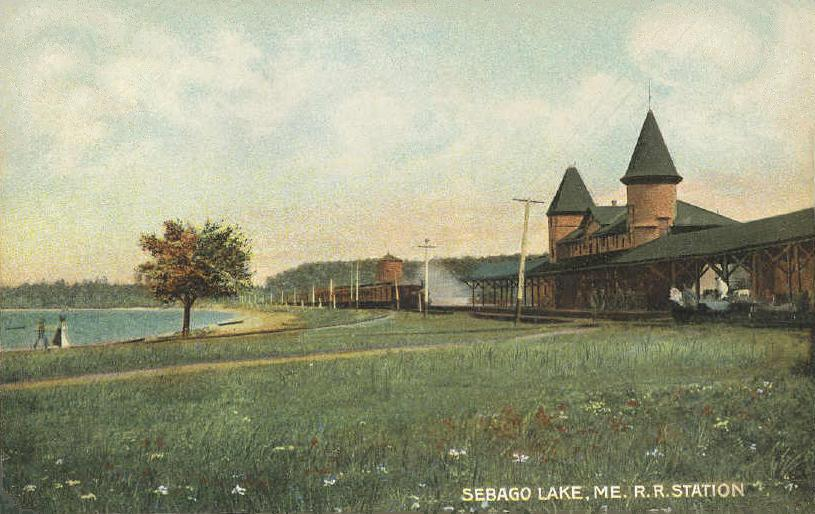
Sebago Lake Sta. in 1907

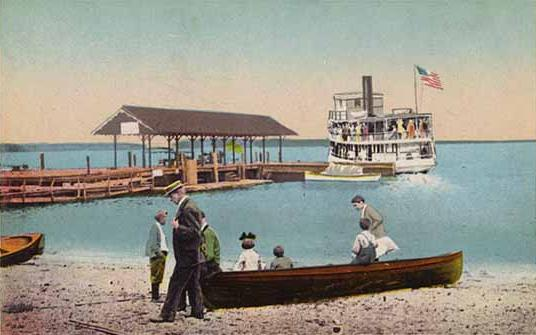
Sebago Lake c. 1915

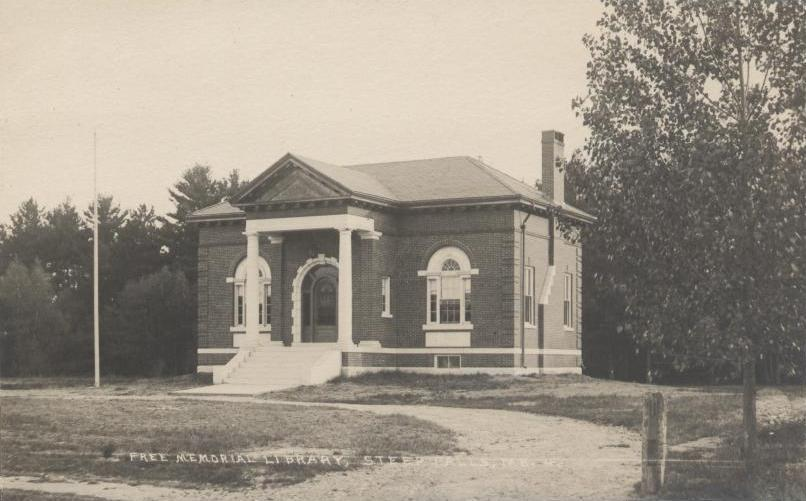
Steep Falls Library c. 1920

== Geography ==
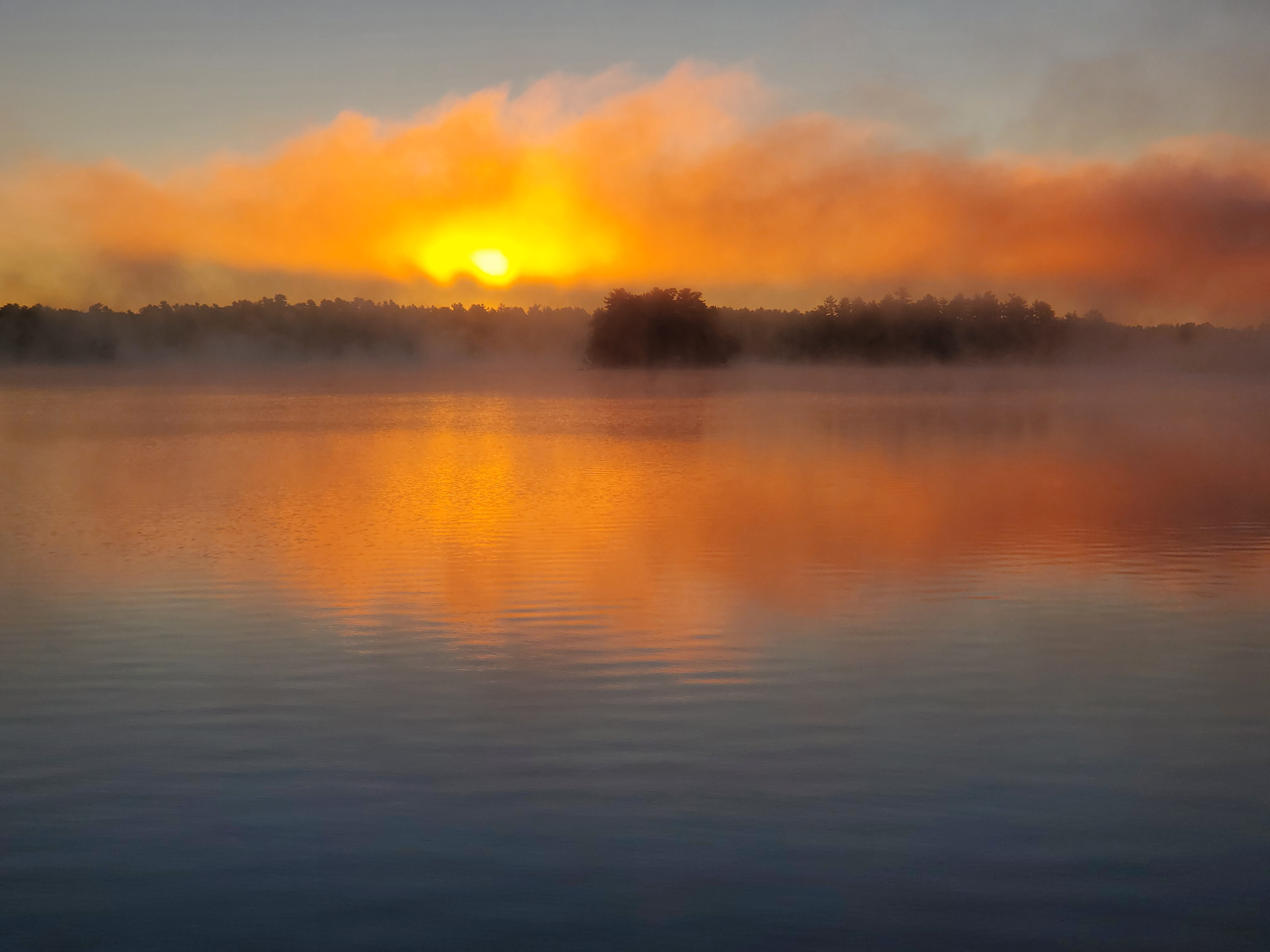
Watchic Lake

According to the United States Census Bureau, the town has a total area of 80.59 square miles (208.73 km^{2}), of which 59.03 square miles (152.89 km^{2}) is land and 21.56 square miles (55.84 km^{2}) is water. Situated beside Sebago Lake, Standish is drained by Sebago Lake and the Presumpscot River, which is the town's eastern border, and by the Saco River, which is the town's (and Cumberland County's) southwestern border. The eastern portion of Standish is part of the Presumpscot River watershed. Watchic Lake is located within the town.

The town is crossed by state routes 11, 25, 25A, 35, 35A, 114, and 237. It is bordered by the towns of Windham and Gorham to the southeast, Buxton and Hollis to the south, Limington to the west, and Baldwin and Sebago to the northwest.

== Demographics ==
Historical population
Census	Pop.	Note	%±
1790	716		—
1800	1,226		71.2%
1810	1,378		12.4%
1820	1,619		17.5%
1830	2,023		25.0%
1840	2,198		8.7%
1850	2,290		4.2%
1860	2,067		−9.7%
1870	2,089		1.1%
1880	2,035		−2.6%
1890	1,841		−9.5%
1900	1,504		−18.3%
1910	1,637		8.8%
1920	1,735		6.0%
1930	1,317		−24.1%
1940	1,472		11.8%
1950	1,786		21.3%
1960	2,095		17.3%
1970	3,122		49.0%
1980	5,946		90.5%
1990	7,678		29.1%
2000	9,285		20.9%
2010	9,874		6.3%
2020	10,244		3.7%
U.S. Decennial Census

=== 2010 census ===
As of the census of 2010, there were 9,874 people, 3,518 households, and 2,572 families living in the town. The population density was 167.3 inhabitants per square mile (64.6/km^{2}). There were 4,425 housing units at an average density of 75.0 per square mile (29.0/km^{2}). The racial makeup of the town was 97.3% White, 0.5% African American, 0.3% Native American, 0.5% Asian, 0.2% from other races, and 1.2% from two or more races. Hispanic or Latino of any race were 0.8% of the population.

There were 3,518 households, of which 33.7% had children under the age of 18 living with them, 58.7% were married couples living together, 9.7% had a female householder with no husband present, 4.6% had a male householder with no wife present, and 26.9% were non-families. 19.3% of all households were made up of individuals, and 5.9% had someone living alone who was 65 years of age or older. The average household size was 2.60 and the average family size was 2.95.

The median age in the town was 38.8 years. 21.7% of residents were under the age of 18; 13.6% were between the ages of 18 and 24; 24.1% were from 25 to 44; 30.4% were from 45 to 64; and 10.2% were 65 years of age or older. The gender makeup of the town was 49.2% male and 50.8% female.

=== 2000 census ===
As of the census of 2000, there were 9,285 people, 3,205 households, and 2,464 families living in the town. The population density was 157.2 inhabitants per square mile (60.7/km^{2}). There were 3,987 housing units at an average density of 67.5 per square mile (26.1/km^{2}). The racial makeup of the town was 98.08% White, 0.39% African American, 0.16% Native American, 0.24% Asian, 0.08% Pacific Islander, 0.23% from other races, and 0.83% from two or more races. Hispanic or Latino of any race were 0.46% of the population.

There were 3,205 households, out of which 37.0% had children under the age of 18 living with them, 64.0% were married couples living together, 8.9% had a female householder with no husband present, and 23.1% were non-families. 16.7% of all households were made up of individuals, and 6.0% had someone living alone who was 65 years of age or older. The average household size was 2.72 and the average family size was 3.03.

In the town, the population was spread out, with 25.3% under the age of 18, 13.1% from 18 to 24, 30.5% from 25 to 44, 23.0% from 45 to 64, and 8.2% who were 65 years of age or older. The median age was 34 years. For every 100 females, there were 94.4 males. For every 100 females age 18 and over, there were 90.4 males.

The median income for a household in the town was $50,278, and the median income for a family was $53,461. Males had a median income of $36,235 versus $26,204 for females. The per capita income for the town was $19,504. About 1.9% of families and 3.6% of the population were below the poverty line, including 3.8% of those under age 18 and none of those age 65 or over.

== Notable people ==
- Marisa Butler, Miss Maine USA 2016, Miss World America 2018, Miss Earth USA 2021
- Emily Durgin, professional distance runner
- Simon M. Hamlin, US congressman
- Albion P. Howe, Civil War era general
- Curtis Jonathan Hussey aka Fandango, Wrestler
- Solomon Nason, Wisconsin farmer, lumberman and legislator (born in Standish in 1825)

== Education ==
Bonny Eagle High School is a public high school serving the towns of Buxton, Hollis, Limington, Standish and Frye Island. Other Maine School Administrative District 6 schools located in Standish are Edna Libby Elementary, George E. Jack, and Steep Falls Elementary.

Saint Joseph's College of Maine has its campus in Standish.

== Sites of interest ==
- Daniel Marrett House – the 1789 home of the town's parson located in town center, now a Historic New England museum
- The Old Red Church – an 1804 meeting house, now a museum
- Schoolhouse Arts Center at Sebago Lake
- Standish Historical Society & Museum
