= Maine State Route 114 =

State highway in Cumberland County, Maine, US

State Route 114

Route information
- Maintained by MaineDOT
- Length: 35.02 mi (56.36 km)

Major junctions
- South end: US 1 / SR 9 / SR 207 in Scarborough
- US 202 / SR 4 / SR 25 in Gorham
- North end: US 302 / SR 11 in Naples

Location
- Country: United States
- State: Maine
- Counties: Cumberland

Highway system
- Maine State Highway System; Interstate; US; State; Auto trails; Lettered highways
| ← SR 113 | → SR 115 |

State Route 114 (SR 114) is a route through southern Maine from U.S. Route 1 (US 1) and SR 9 and SR 207 in Scarborough to US 302 and SR 11 in Naples. The entire route is in Cumberland County.

== Route description ==
SR 114 begins at an intersection with US 1/SR 9 and SR 207 in Scarborough. There, it heads northwest into Gorham. It has a short concurrency with SR 22. It goes through the city's center and junctions US 202 and SR 4 and SR 25. It heads into Standish and junctions SR 35. Then it follows the Sebago Lake coast into Sebago. From there it carries SR 11 from its previous concurrency with SR 107. It carries SR 11 to its northern end in Naples. SR 11 turns east with US 302 towards Casco.

== Junction list ==
The entire route is in Cumberland County.

| Location | mi | km | Destinations | Notes |
|---|---|---|---|---|
| Scarborough | 0.00 | 0.00 | US 1 / SR 9 / SR 207 south (Black Point Road) | Northern terminus of SR 207 |
| Gorham | 5.45 | 8.77 | SR 22 east (County Road) – Westbrook | Eastern end of SR 22 concurrency |
| Gorham | 6.34 | 10.20 | SR 22 west (County Road) – Buxton | Western end of SR 22 concurrency |
| Gorham | 7.20– 7.22 | 11.59– 11.62 | SR 112 south to SR 25 – Standish | Northern terminus of SR 112; roundabout |
| Gorham | 9.29 | 14.95 | US 202 / SR 4 / SR 25 (Main Street / State Street) – Standish, Westbrook | |
| Standish | 16.66 | 26.81 | SR 35 (Northeast Road / Chadbourne Road) – Standish, North Windham | |
| Sebago | 25.67 | 41.31 | SR 11 south (Sebago Road) – Baldwin | Southern end of SR 11 concurrency |
| Naples | 35.02 | 56.36 | US 302 / SR 11 north (Roosevelt Trail) – Bridgton, Portland | Northern end of SR 11 concurrency |
1.000 mi = 1.609 km; 1.000 km = 0.621 mi: Concurrency terminus
