= Sebago Lake, Maine =

- Village
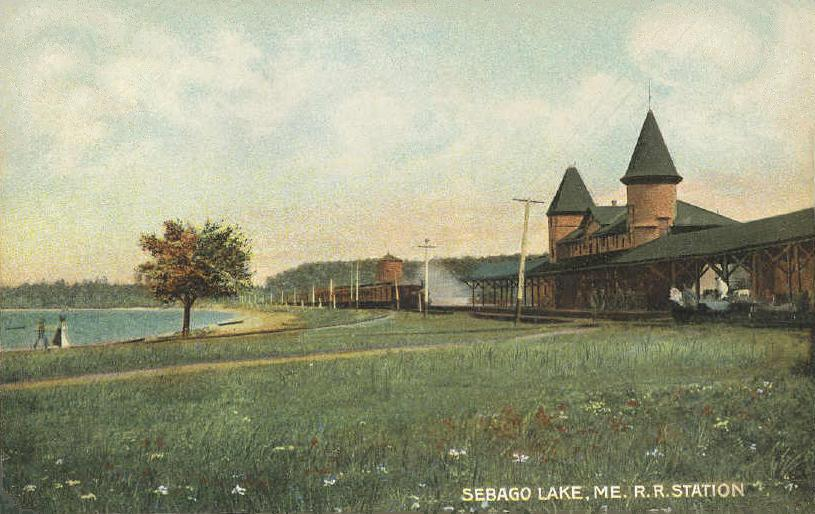
- Sebago Lake Depot in 1907

- Location within Maine
- Coordinates: 43°45′39″N 70°31′32″W
- Country: United States
- State: Maine
- County: Cumberland
- Elevation: 289 ft (88 m)
- Time zone: UTC-5 (Eastern (EST))
  - Summer (DST): UTC-4 (EDT)
- ZIP Code: 04084 (Standish)
- Area code: 207
- GNIS feature ID: 575156

Sebago Lake is an unincorporated village in the town of Standish, Cumberland County, Maine, United States. The community is located on the south shore of its eponymous lake at the junction of Maine State Route 35 and Maine State Route 114.
