= Steep Falls, Maine =

- Census-designated place
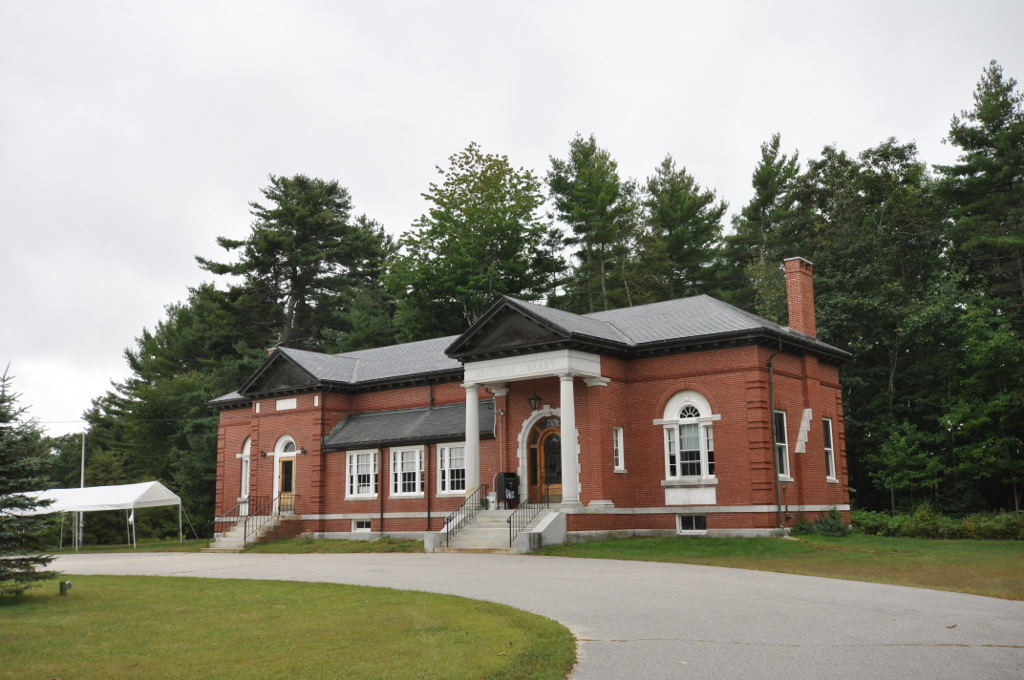
- The Steep Falls Library

- Location in Cumberland County and the state of Maine
- Coordinates: 43°47′27″N 70°37′08″W
- Country: United States
- State: Maine
- County: Cumberland
- Town: Standish

Area
  - Total: 10.20 sq mi (26.41 km^{2})
  - Land: 10.03 sq mi (25.99 km^{2})
  - Water: 0.16 sq mi (0.42 km^{2})
- Elevation: 305 ft (93 m)

Population (2020)
  - Total: 1,223
  - Density: 121.9/sq mi (47.06/km^{2})
- Time zone: UTC-5 (Eastern (EST))
  - Summer (DST): UTC-4 (EDT)
- ZIP Code: 04085
- Area code: 207
- FIPS code: 23-73985
- GNIS feature ID: 2583566

Steep Falls is a census-designated place (CDP) in the town of Standish in Cumberland County, Maine, United States. As of the 2020 census, Steep Falls had a population of 1,223. It is part of the Portland–South Portland–Biddeford, Maine Metropolitan Statistical Area. The town is part of Maine School Administrative District #6, which includes Bonny Eagle Middle and High Schools.

== Geography ==
Steep Falls is located in the western corner of the town of Standish along the Saco River. Maine State Route 11 crosses the Saco River into the community, heading southwest towards Limington and Limerick and north towards Naples. Maine State Route 113 coincides with Route 11 through the center of Steep Falls, then heads southeast towards Standish village and northwest towards Hiram and Fryeburg.

According to the United States Census Bureau, the Steep Falls CDP has a total area of 10.2 square miles (26.4 km^{2}), of which 10.0 square miles (26.0 km^{2}) is land and 0.15 square miles (0.4 km^{2}), or 1.58%, is water.

=== Climate ===
This climatic region is typified by large seasonal temperature differences, with warm to hot (and often humid) summers and cold (sometimes severely cold) winters. According to the Köppen Climate Classification system, Steep Falls has a humid continental climate, abbreviated "Dfb" on climate maps.

== Demographics ==
Historical population
Census	Pop.	Note	%±
2020	1,223		—
U.S. Decennial Census
