= Gorham (CDP), Maine =

Gorham, Maine
- Census-designated place
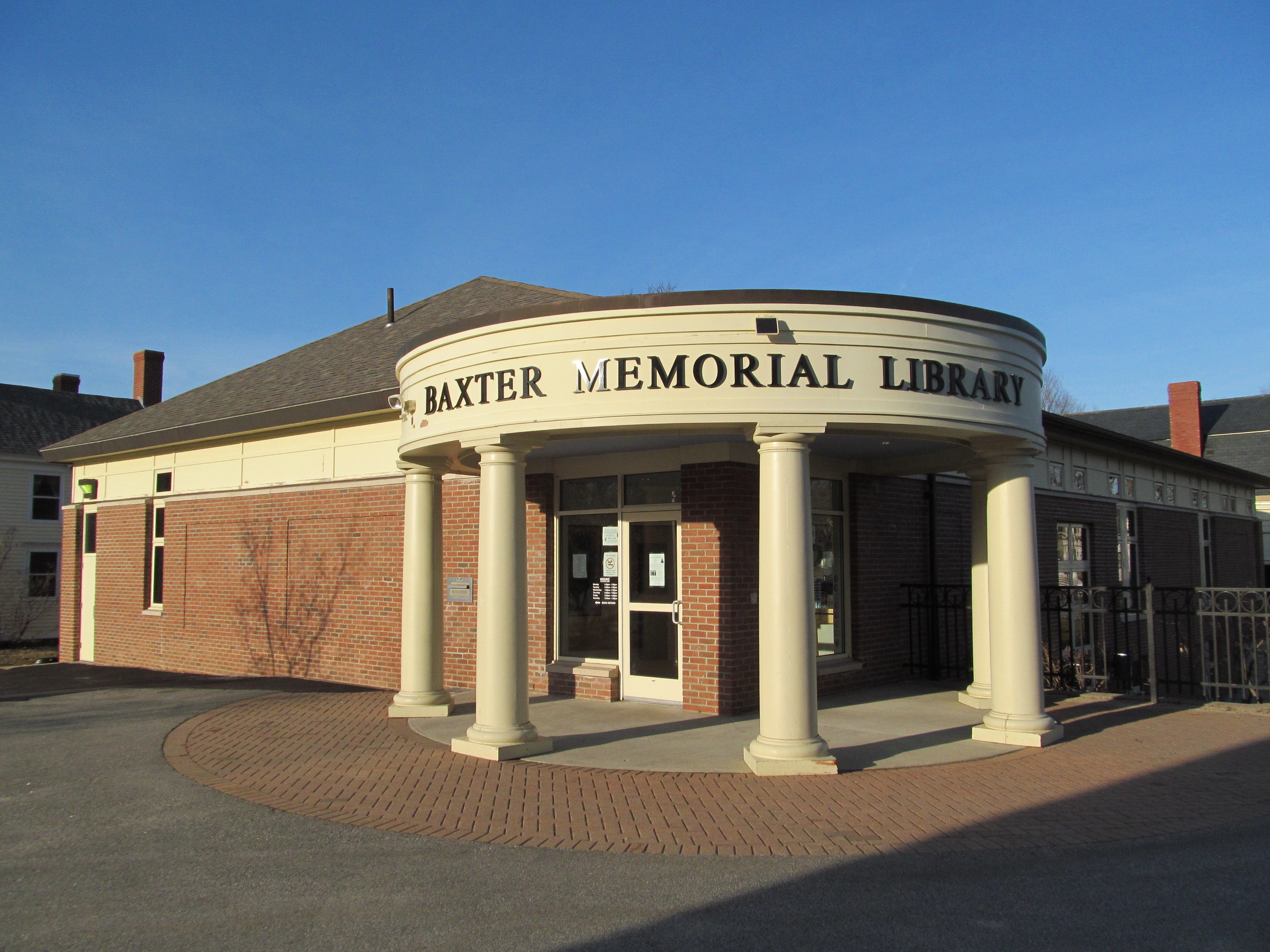
- Baxter Memorial Library

- Location in Cumberland County and the state of Maine
- Coordinates: 43°40′56″N 70°26′29″W
- Country: United States
- State: Maine
- County: Cumberland
- Town: Gorham

Area
  - Total: 7.68 sq mi (19.88 km^{2})
  - Land: 7.66 sq mi (19.83 km^{2})
  - Water: 0.019 sq mi (0.05 km^{2})
- Elevation: 197 ft (60 m)

Population (2020)
  - Total: 7,469
  - Density: 975.5/sq mi (376.63/km^{2})
- Time zone: UTC-5 (Eastern (EST))
  - Summer (DST): UTC-4 (EDT)
- ZIP code: 04038
- Area code: 207
- FIPS code: 23-28205
- GNIS feature ID: 2378356

Gorham is a census-designated place (CDP) in the town of Gorham, in Cumberland County, Maine, United States. The population was 6,882 at the 2010 census. It is part of the Portland–South Portland–Biddeford, Maine Metropolitan Statistical Area.

== Geography ==
According to the United States Census Bureau, the CDP has a total area of 7.7 square miles (19.9 km^{2}), of which 7.6 square miles (19.8 km^{2}) is land and 0.04 square miles (0.1 km^{2}), or 0.26%, is water.

== Demographics ==
Historical population
| Census | Pop. | Note | %± |
|---|---|---|---|
| 2020 | 7,469 | | — |
U.S. Decennial Census

As of the census of 2000, there were 4,164 people, 1,317 households, and 783 families residing in the CDP. The population density was 769.6 inhabitants per square mile (297.1/km^{2}). There were 1,371 housing units at an average density of 253.4 per square mile (97.8/km^{2}). The racial makeup of the CDP was 96.76% White, 0.55% Black or African American, 0.60% Native American, 1.10% Asian, 0.02% Pacific Islander, 0.14% from other races, and 0.82% from two or more races. Hispanic or Latino of any race were 0.77% of the population.

There were 1,317 households, out of which 26.9% had children under the age of 18 living with them, 47.8% were married couples living together, 8.7% had a female householder with no husband present, and 40.5% were non-families. 32.5% of all households were made up of individuals, and 17.8% had someone living alone who was 65 years of age or older. The average household size was 2.32 and the average family size was 2.97.

In the CDP, the population was spread out, with 16.9% under the age of 18, 31.2% from 18 to 24, 19.8% from 25 to 44, 16.8% from 45 to 64, and 15.4% who were 65 years of age or older. The median age was 28 years. For every 100 females, there were 86.0 males. For every 100 females age 18 and over, there were 83.4 males.

The median income for a household in the CDP was $40,368, and the median income for a family was $53,456. Males had a median income of $38,810 versus $31,875 for females. The per capita income for the CDP was $17,844. About 4.2% of families and 9.4% of the population were below the poverty line, including 8.4% of those under age 18 and 8.6% of those age 65 or over.

Note that this CDP contains the dormitories of the University of Southern Maine's Gorham campus, affecting all of the above statistics.
