= Standish (CDP), Maine =

Standish, Maine
- Census-designated place
- Location in Cumberland County and the state of Maine
- Coordinates: 43°44′48″N 70°33′04″W
- Country: United States
- State: Maine
- County: Cumberland
- Town: Standish

Area
  - Total: 2.68 sq mi (6.94 km^{2})
  - Land: 2.68 sq mi (6.94 km^{2})
  - Water: 0 sq mi (0.00 km^{2})
- Elevation: 420 ft (130 m)

Population (2020)
  - Total: 480
  - Density: 179.2/sq mi (69.19/km^{2})
- Time zone: UTC-5 (Eastern (EST))
  - Summer (DST): UTC-4 (EDT)
- ZIP Code: 04084
- Area code: 207
- FIPS code: 23-73635
- GNIS feature ID: 2583565

Standish, known locally as Standish Corner, is a census-designated place (CDP) in the town of Standish in Cumberland County, Maine, United States. The population was 469 at the 2010 census. It is part of the Portland–South Portland–Biddeford, Maine Metropolitan Statistical Area.

== Geography ==
Standish is located at the intersection of Maine State Routes 25 and 35. Route 25 runs west towards New Hampshire and east to Gorham and Portland, while Route 35 travels north towards North Windham and south to Buxton, Hollis and eventually Kennebunk.

According to the United States Census Bureau, the Standish CDP has a total area of 2.7 square miles (6.9 km^{2}), all land.

== Demographics ==
Historical population
Census	Pop.	Note	%±
2020	480		—
U.S. Decennial Census
