= Maine State Route 224 =

State highway in York County, Maine, US

State Route 224

Route information
- Maintained by MaineDOT
- Length: 2.08 mi (3.35 km)
- Existed: 1933–present

Major junctions
- West end: SR 11 / SR 11A / SR 109 in Sanford
- East end: US 202 / SR 4A in Sanford

Location
- Country: United States
- State: Maine
- Counties: York

Highway system
- Maine State Highway System; Interstate; US; State; Auto trails; Lettered highways
← SR 223	→ SR 225

State Route 224 (SR 224) is part of Maine's system of numbered state highways, located within the city of Sanford. It is a northern bypass of downtown Sanford that runs for 2.08 miles (3.35 km) between State Route 11, State Route 11A, and State Route 109 in Springvale and U.S. Route 202 and State Route 4A near the border with Alfred. SR 224 runs along the Mousam River for most of its length.

== Route description ==
SR 224 begins just west of downtown Sanford at the intersection of Main Street, Oak Street, and Bridge Street. SR 224 crosses the Mousam River on Bridge Street, then immediately turns southeast onto Pleasant Street and runs along the northern side of the river, passing several churches, housing developments, and shops in Springvale. At River Street, SR 224 passes Carl J. Lamb Elementary School and continues onto Shaws Ridge Road. The highway turns northeast, then again southeast and terminates at US 202/SR 4A just southwest of the Alfred town line.

== History ==
The SR 224 designation was first used on a route between Dexter and Guilford, which was renumbered in 1933 as SR 24 and exists now as the northernmost segment of SR 23.

Modern SR 224 was designated in 1933 on a new alignment in Springvale, then overlapped with SR 4 (and later US 202 in 1936) northeast into Alfred where it most likely terminated at SR 111. In 1939, the concurrency with US 202 and SR 4 (now SR 4A) was eliminated, truncating SR 224 to its current eastern terminus. Its alignment has not changed since.

== Major junctions ==
The entire route is in Sanford, York County.

mi	km	Destinations	Notes
0.00	0.00	SR 11 / SR 109 (Main Street) / SR 11A south (Oak Street) – Lebanon, Sanford, Acton	Western terminus; northern terminus of SR 11A
2.08	3.35	US 202 / SR 4A (Sanford Road) / Grammar Road – Alfred, Biddeford, Sanford	Eastern terminus
1.000 mi = 1.609 km; 1.000 km = 0.621 mi
