= Edmund E. Goodwin House =

Historic house in Maine, United States

- U.S. National Register of Historic Places
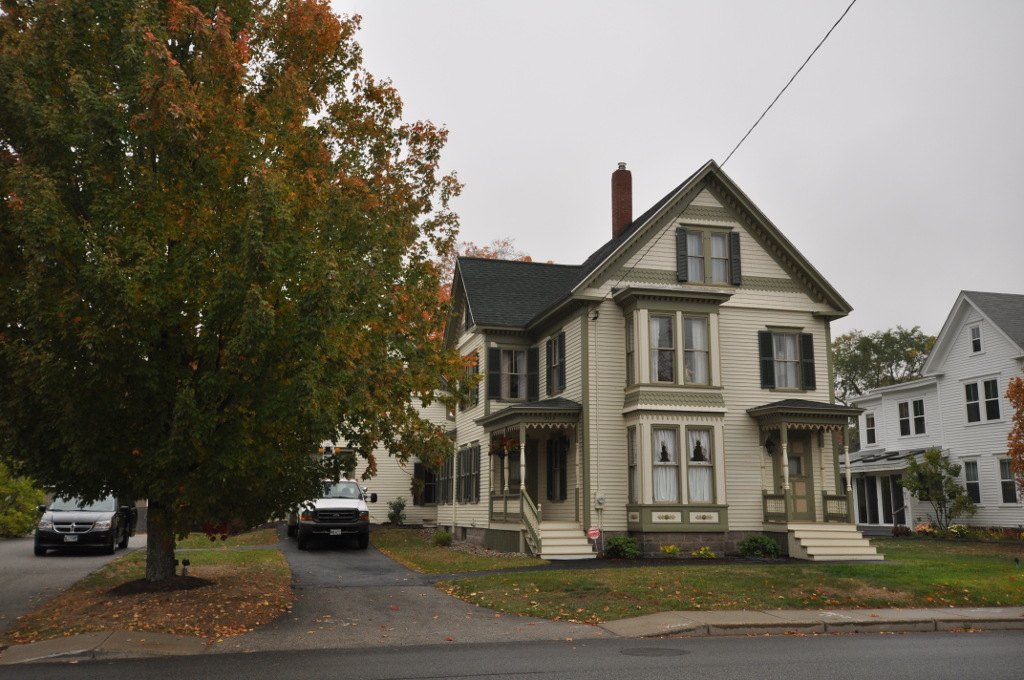

- Location within Maine Location within the United States
- Location: 503 Main St., Sanford, Maine
- Coordinates: 43°27′48″N 70°47′45″W
- Area: less than one acre
- Built: 1899
- Architectural style: Queen Anne
- NRHP reference No.: 15000770
- Added to NRHP: November 9, 2015

The Edmund E. Goodwin House is a historic house at 503 Main Street in Sanford, Maine. It was built in 1899 for Edmund Goodwin, a prominent local businessman, and is a well-preserved example of Queen Anne Victorian architecture. The house was listed on the National Register of Historic Places in 1975. It is owned by the Sanford Historical Society.

== Description and history ==
The Goodwin House is located in Sanford's Springvale village, on the west side of Main Street (Maine State Route 109) next to the Sanford-Springvale Historic Museum, located in the former Sanford Town Hall. It is a 2 1/2-story wood-frame structure, finished with a combination of clapboard siding and decorative cut shingles. It is two bays wide, with a two-story projecting rectangular bay on the left and an entrance porch on the right, supported by turned posts. A second porch extends along the left side, with similar decorative elements, up to a side projecting section. A series of ells connect the main house to a period carriage barn. The interior retains many original finishes, hardware, cabinets, and woodwork. Surviving features include original wallpaper, light fixtures, and coal chute and bins in the basement.

The house was built in 1899 for Edmund Goodwin, a prominent local merchant and manufacturer then late in his life. Goodwin was also a civic benefactor, funding construction of the adjacent town hall. The house remained in his family until it was sold to the historical society in 2014.

== See also ==
- National Register of Historic Places listings in York County, Maine
