= Maine State Route 9B =

State highway in Maine, United States

State Route 9B

Route information
- Auxiliary route of SR 9
- Maintained by MaineDOT
- Length: 4.1 mi (6.6 km)
- Existed: 1955 (current routing)–present

Major junctions
- West end: SR 9 in Wells
- East end: US 1 in Wells

Location
- Country: United States
- State: Maine
- Counties: York

Highway system
- Maine State Highway System; Interstate; US; State; Auto trails; Lettered highways
← SR 9A	→ SR 10

State Route 9B (SR 9B) is a short state highway in southern Maine. It begins in the west at an intersection with SR 9, serving as a 4.1-mile (6.6 km) southern spur of the highway, to U.S. Route 1 (US 1) near Wells Beach. The route is located entirely within Wells.

== Route description ==
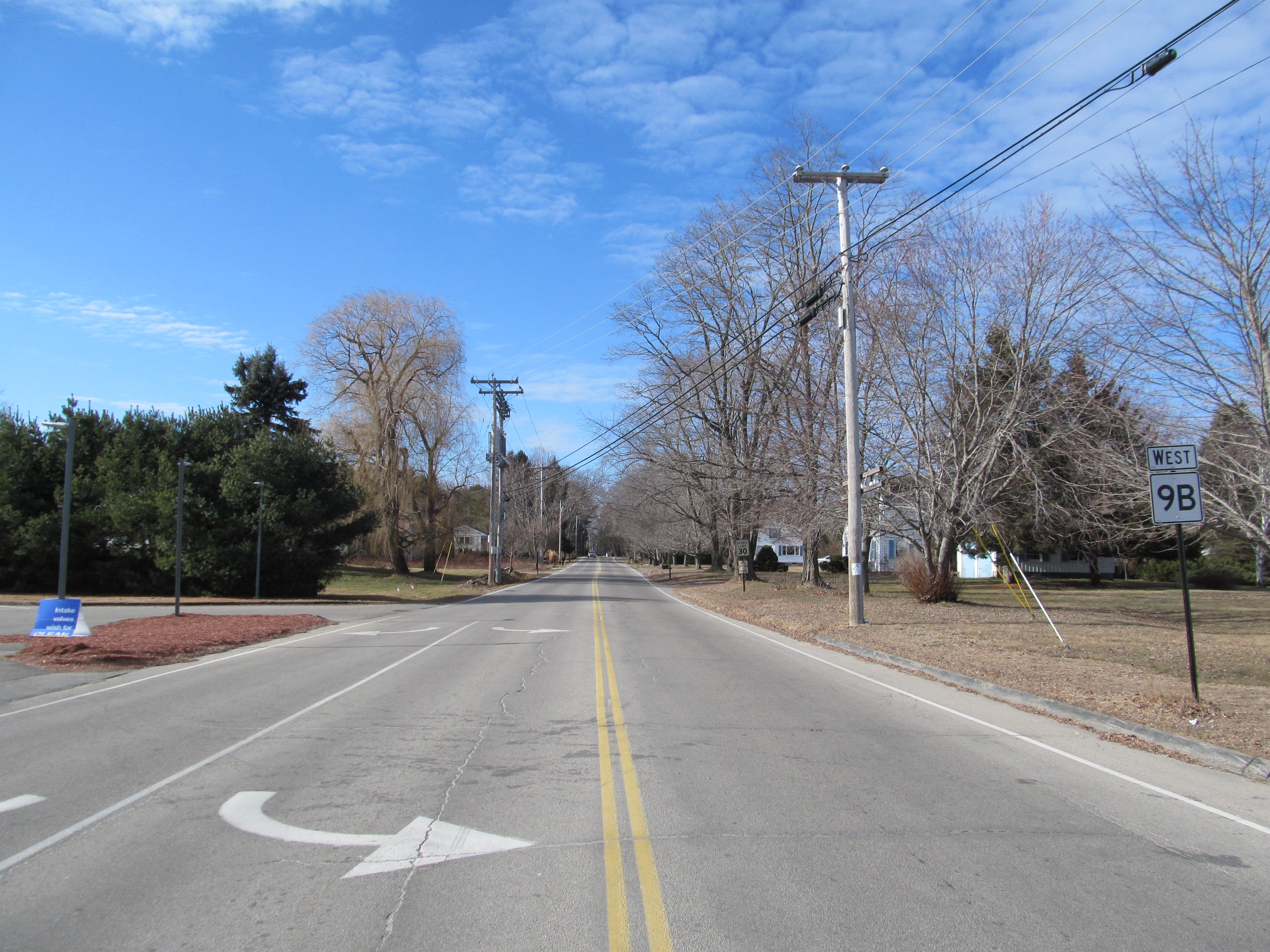
SR 9B westbound in Wells

SR 9B begins west of town, where SR 9 begins to turn to the northeast. It runs eastward, intersecting local roads as it heads towards the coastline. SR 9B crosses over the Maine Turnpike without an interchange (the nearest entrance is at Exit 19, accessible from SR 9/SR 109). SR 9B continues eastward until it intersects and ends at US 1.

== History ==
SR 9B used to be co-signed with US 1 from Charles Chase Corner (its current terminus) north to US 1's intersection with SR 9 in Wells, connecting SR 9B to its parent at both ends and making it a loop. However, in 1955 the concurrency was removed, truncating SR 9B to its current terminus and reducing it to a spur.

== Major intersections ==
The entire route is in Wells, York County.

mi	km	Destinations	Notes
0.0	0.0	SR 9 (North Berwick Road) – North Berwick, Sanford	
4.1	6.6	US 1 (Post Road) – Wells, Ogunquit	
1.000 mi = 1.609 km; 1.000 km = 0.621 mi
