= Maine State Route 99 =

State highway in York County, Maine, US

State Route 99

Route information
- Maintained by MaineDOT
- Length: 8.69 mi (13.99 km)
- Existed: 1941–present

Major junctions
- West end: SR 109 in Sanford
- East end: US 1 / SR 9A in Kennebunk

Location
- Country: United States
- State: Maine
- Counties: York

Highway system
- Maine State Highway System; Interstate; US; State; Auto trails; Lettered highways
| ← SR 98 | → SR 100 |

State Route 99 (SR 99) is part of Maine's system of numbered state highways, located in York County. It runs 8.7 miles (14.0 km) from an intersection with SR 109 in Sanford to Kennebunk, where it meets SR 9A and U.S. Route 1 (US 1). SR 99 is signed as an east–west route.

== Route description ==
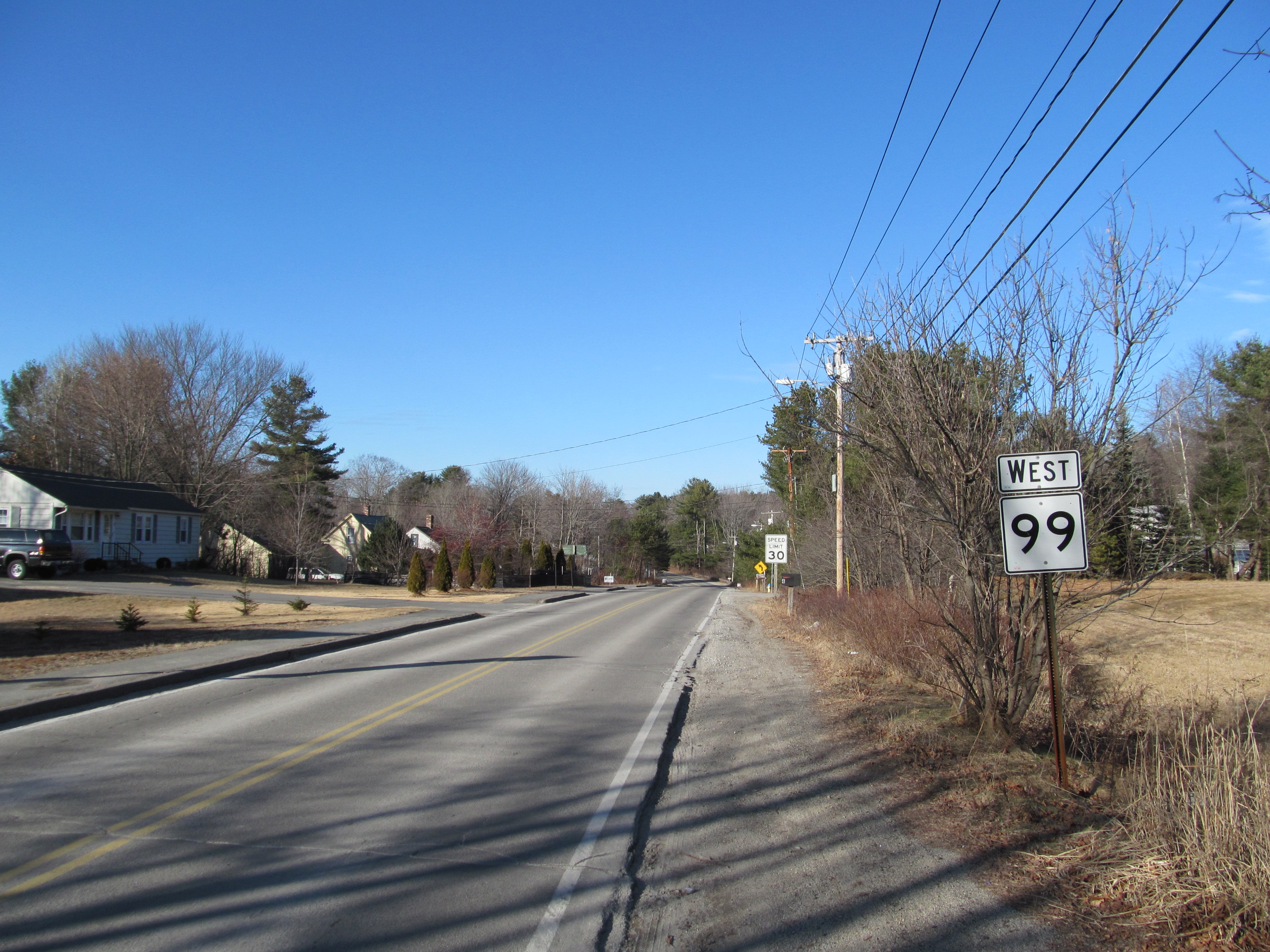
SR 99 westbound in Kennebunk

SR 99 begins in the west at SR 109 in the southeastern corner of Sanford. The highway crosses into Kennebunk and runs east into town along the Mousam River. SR 99 passes over the Maine Turnpike (Interstate 95) without an interchange before intersecting SR 9A. SR 99 is cosigned with SR 9A into downtown for before the two routes meet US 1. SR 99 ends at this intersection while SR 9A joins up with US 1 north. SR 35 crosses US 1 less than 1/4 mile (0.40 km) from this intersection.

The route is also known as Cat Mousam Road (in Kennebunk), Webber Hill Road, and Kennebunk Road (in Sanford). Route 99 also passes by Lloid G. Nedeau Memorial Park.

== History ==
SR 99 has always had its administrative terminus at US 1 in Kennebunk, but its signed eastern terminus was historically located at its intersection with SR 9A west of downtown. Signage from US 1 for SR 9A read "To SR 99." Signage has since been updated, and SR 99 is now cosigned with SR 9A between the two historic termini.

== Major junctions ==
The entire route is in York County.

| Location | mi | km | Destinations | Notes |
|---|---|---|---|---|
| Sanford | 0.00 | 0.00 | SR 109 (Main Street) to SR 4 / SR 4A – Sanford, Wells | |
| Kennebunk | 8.39 | 13.50 | SR 9A west (High Street) – Wells, North Berwick | Western terminus of SR 9A/SR 99 concurrency |
| Kennebunk | 8.69 | 13.99 | US 1 / SR 9A east (Main Street/York Street) to SR 35 – Wells, Kennebunkport, Biddeford | Eastern terminus of SR 9A/SR 99 concurrency |
1.000 mi = 1.609 km; 1.000 km = 0.621 mi: Concurrency terminus
