= Maine State Route 9A =

State highway in Maine, United States

State Route 9A

Route information
- Maintained by MaineDOT
- Length: 11.2 mi (18.0 km)

Major junctions
- West end: SR 9 in Wells
- SR 109 in Wells; SR 99 in Kennebunk; US 1 / SR 35 in Kennebunk
- East end: SR 9 / SR 35 in Kennebunkport

Location
- Country: United States
- State: Maine

Highway system
- Maine State Highway System; Interstate; US; State; Auto trails; Lettered highways
← SR 9	→ SR 9B

State Route 9A (SR 9A) is a numbered state highway in Maine, which serves as an alternative to SR 9. It starts from SR 9 in Wells and returns to SR 9 in Kennebunk.

== Route description ==
SR 9A begins at a split with SR 9 in Wells, curving to the northeast and immediately crossing Route 109. SR 9A proceeds northeast, paralleling Interstate 95 (Maine Turnpike), as well as U.S. Route 1 (US 1) and SR 9 which lay to its east. SR 9A turns to the east and enters the town of Kennebunk, passing under the Turnpike without an interchange. SR 9A meets the eastern end of SR 99 and then promptly intersects US 1, with which it forms a brief concurrency. US 1 and SR 9A intersect with SR 35 downtown, at which point SR 9A turns southeast, leaving US 1 to join SR 35. SR 9A and 35 continue about 2 miles (3.2 km) southeast to Kennebunkport and an intersection with SR 9, at which both routes end in concurrency.

== Junction list ==
The entire route is in York County.

Location	mi	km	Destinations	Notes
Wells	0.0	0.0	SR 9 – Wells, North Berwick	
Wells	0.9	1.4	SR 109 – Sanford, Wells	
Kennebunk	7.0	11.3	SR 99 west – Sanford	South end of SR 99 overlap
Kennebunk	7.3	11.7	US 1 south / SR 99 ends – Wells	West end of US 1 overlap; eastern terminus of SR 99
Kennebunk	7.7	12.4	US 1 north – Biddeford SR 35 north to I-95 (Maine Turnpike)	East end of US 1 overlap; west end of SR 35 overlap
Kennebunkport	11.2	18.0	SR 9 (Western Avenue) / Beach Avenue ends / SR 35	Southern terminus of SR 35
1.000 mi = 1.609 km; 1.000 km = 0.621 mi: Concurrency terminus
