= Alfred (CDP), Maine =

Alfred, Maine
- Census-designated place
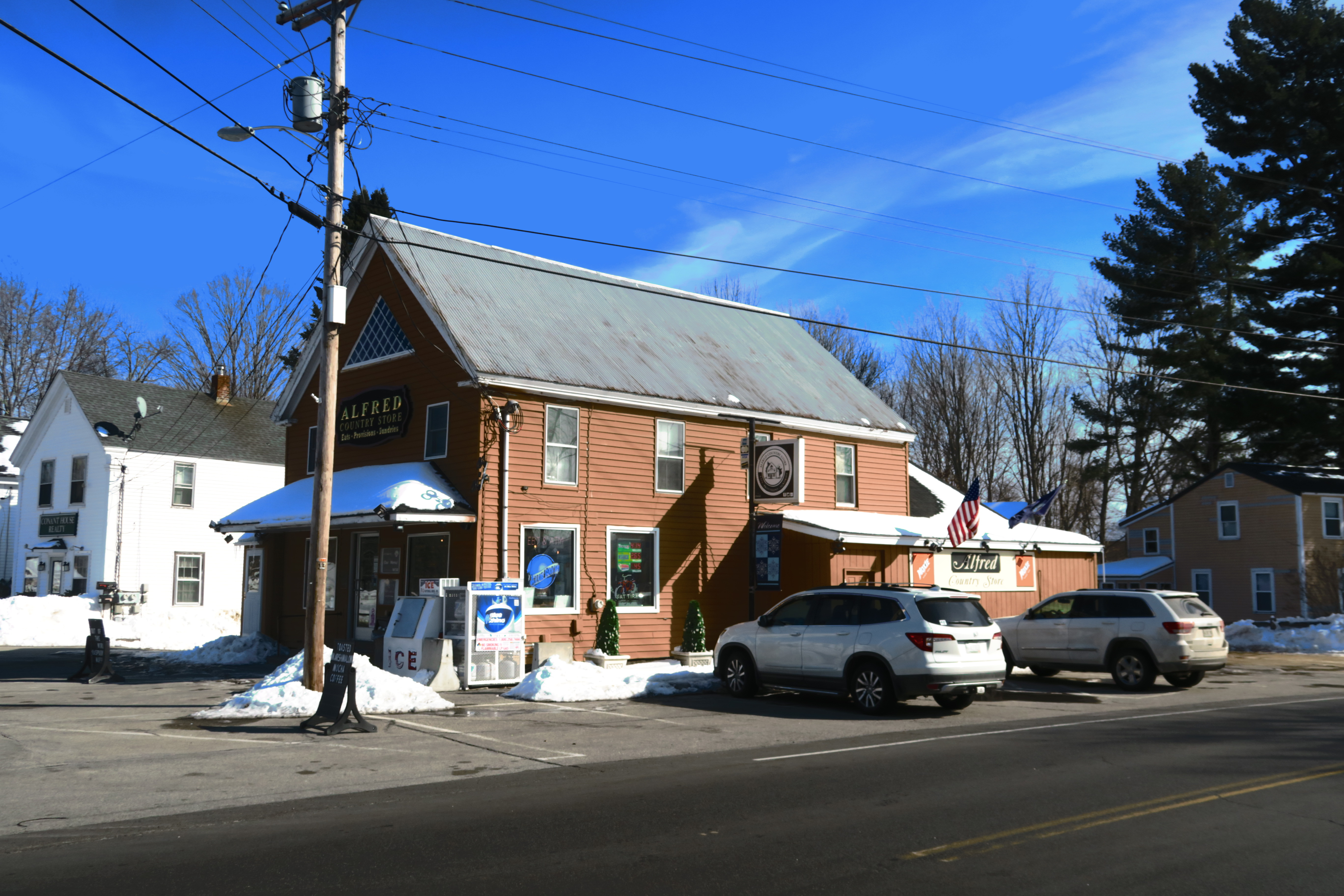
- Store in Alfred

- Location within Maine Location within the United States
- Coordinates: 43°28′48″N 70°44′08″W
- Country: United States
- State: Maine
- County: York
- Town: Alfred

Area
  - Total: 3.96 sq mi (10.25 km^{2})
  - Land: 3.93 sq mi (10.19 km^{2})
  - Water: 0.027 sq mi (0.07 km^{2})
- Elevation: 256 ft (78 m)

Population (2020)
  - Total: 874
  - Density: 222.2/sq mi (85.81/km^{2})
- Time zone: UTC-5 (Eastern (EST))
  - Summer (DST): UTC-4 (EDT)
- ZIP Code: 04002
- Area code: 207
- FIPS code: 23-00695
- GNIS feature ID: 2747297

Alfred is a census-designated place (CDP) and the primary village in the town of Alfred, York County, Maine, United States. It is in central York County and the center of the town of Alfred, 4 miles (6 km) northeast of Sanford and 13 miles (21 km) west of Biddeford. U.S. Route 202 passes through the village, leading northeast 23 miles (37 km) to Gorham and southwest through Sanford 20 miles (32 km) to Rochester, New Hampshire. Maine State Route 4 leads south 13 miles (21 km) to North Berwick and leads north out of town with US 202. State Route 111 leads east from Alfred to Biddeford.

The Middle Branch Mousam River flows through the western and southern parts of the CDP, and the Littlefield River, a tributary of the Middle Branch, forms the eastern edge. The Mousam River flows southeast to the Atlantic Ocean at Kennebunk Beach, Maine.

Alfred was first listed as a CDP in 2013.

== Demographics ==
Historical population
Census	Pop.	Note	%±
2020	874		—
U.S. Decennial Census

== Education ==
The community is in School Administrative District 57.
