= Sanford-Springvale Historic Museum =

- Sanford Town Hall (Former)
- U.S. National Register of Historic Places
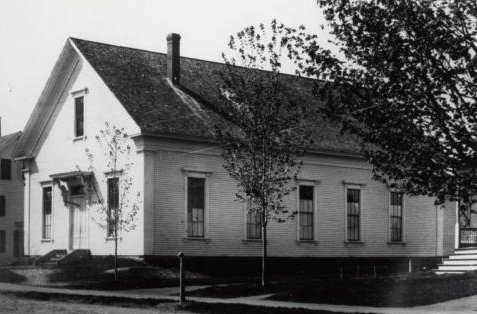
- c. 1900 photo by Fred Philpot

- Location within Maine Location within the United States
- Location: 505 Main St., Springvale, Maine
- Coordinates: 43°27′47″N 70°47′44″W
- Area: less than one acre
- NRHP reference No.: 06001225
- Added to NRHP: January 9, 2007

The Sanford-Springvale Historic Museum is located at 505 Main Street (Maine State Route 109) in the Springvale village of Sanford, Maine. It is located in the Former Sanford Town Hall, built in 1873 and listed on the National Register of Historic Places in 2007, and is operated by the Sanford-Springvale Historical Society.

== Description and history ==
The museum is located on the south side of Main Street in Springvale, opposite Merrill Street. It is a single-story wood frame structure, with a front-facing gable roof, clapboard siding, and granite foundation. Its front (north-facing) facade is symmetrically arranged, with a center entrance sheltered by a bracketed Italianate hood, and sash windows to either side and above in the gable. The windows are topped by heavy modillioned lintels. The building's corners are pilasters, and there are broad friezes under the eaves and raking edges of the gable. The interior of the building has a foyer area that opens into large hall, with a stage at the far end. A keystoned proscenium arch frames the stage, supported by engaged columns.

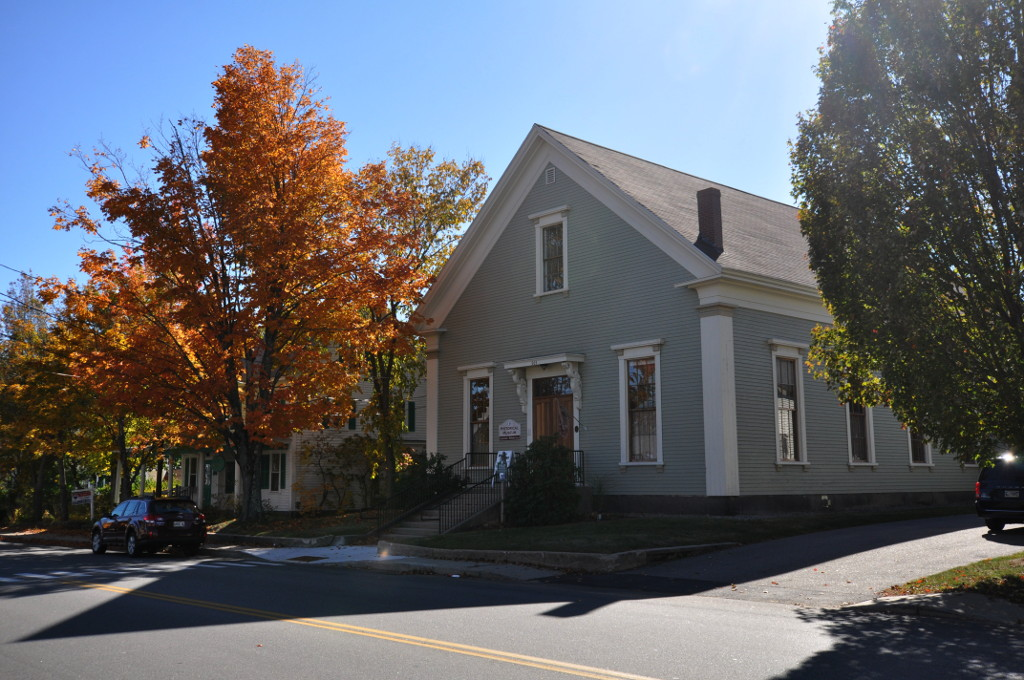
The building in 2015

The hall was built in 1873, to serve as Sanford's second town hall and as a public meeting hall. It served in these roles until 1908, when the town offices were moved to a new building in Sanford village. Originally without a stage, the building was enlarged in 1903 to include one, and about 1913 a gallery was built above the foyer. It continued to serve as a community meeting space until the 1960s. It was then used for about 40 years as a gymnasium by Sanford Springvale Youth Athletic Association, its interior space modified to house a basketball court. In 2005 the building was acquired by the local historical society, which has restored its exterior to its original 1873 appearance, and its interior to c. 1913, with the hall now primarily used for museum exhibits and meetings.

== See also ==
- National Register of Historic Places listings in York County, Maine
