= Marion C. Goodall =

Marion C. Goodall (Marland), was born May 24, 1875, in Sanford, Maine, the daughter of Goodall mills business mogul George Goodall and his wife Henrietta D. Goodall. Marion Goodall was a wife, mother, and philanthropist throughout her life, providing financial donations and her time to multiple projects until her death on December 16, 1958.

== Early life ==
Marion Goodall was born May 24, 1875, to Henrietta D. (Bennett) Goodall and George Goodall. She was the couple’s only child and began her life in their family home on School Street in Sanford, Maine. Fabric Mogul George Goodall allowed Marion to thrive in her early years. She was home schooled early on and was then sent to the Bellows School, in Portland, Maine. Marion Goodall was by her father’s side through most of her childhood and in later years after her marriage. Goodall engaged herself in many activities both in and out of the home. One Kennebunk, Maine, newspaper of the time mentioned her competing with a group of other young women in various rowing and sailing events at their family home in Cape Porpoise, Maine (the home today still standing). During this time a man by the name of William Marland was visiting Sanford on business and the two were introduced; by 1903 they were wed. In 1907 the Marlands moved to Brookline, Massachusetts. William became the Boston-based representative for the Sanford Mills as the manager of the company's new artificial leather plant. In Massachusetts the couple began the construction of a new home. The couple hired architect Walter H. Killam to design their house in 1914 and Marion became in charge of choosing design elements for their new home.

== Return to Maine ==
In 1923 Marion’s mother Henrietta Goodall visited the couple for Thanksgiving; she fell violently ill and contracted pneumonia. She later died that December. Her death ushered in the creation of the Henrietta D. Goodall Memorial Hospital. Marion's father George Goodall donated all the necessary funds to successfully create the first full service healthcare facility in Sanford. The facility opened its doors in August 1928 with George Goodall becoming the primary benefactor of the hospital. In the late 1920s, George Goodall fell ill on a trip to Hollywood, California, while visiting the west coast home of his brother Louis B. Goodall Upon George Goodall's passing William Marland became the President of the Sanford Mills. Marion Marland, the only child of George Goodall, received a total of $600,000 after the estate was divided amongst the family and community charities. Gender expectations of the time prevented Marion Goodall from assuming control of the Goodall Enterprises. However, upon the passing of George Goodall, the Marlands also became the sole benefactors of the newly established Goodall Hospital. William Marland was in charge of the financial status of the hospital and Marion was in charge of decorating and renovating the hospital rooms to create an experience that was pleasurable, with custom furniture and draperies and fabrics with "happy colors". Taking control of Goodall enterprises led to the couple to move from their home in Brookline, Massachusetts, to Marion's late father's home on School Street in Sanford, Maine. This was the home the two resided in for the duration of their lives.

== Later life ==
The lives of Marion and her husband, William, were one of both work and play. The two were active philanthropists. William conducted all of the hospital's financial business and Marion provided her time and expertise in keeping the hospital staff in good morale and the building in good style. The two had no children of their own however, they adopted a girl by the name of Elfreida, the child of one of their servants. Elfrieda and her husband, Walter, provided the Marlands with three grandchildren. Marion and William in their later years provided multiple donations, and were known as gracious philanthropists to multiple organizations around the town. One noted gift, in particular, was a large donation to Nasson College in Springvale, Maine, in the form of a dormitory building known as Marland Hall. Marion Goodall died in Sanford, Maine, on December 16, 1958. She is buried in the family plot at Oakdale Cemetery in Sanford.
