= Charles Kruger (politician) =

American politician

Member of the Maine House of Representatives from the 48th district
- In office 2008–2016
- Succeeded by: Sara Gideon

Personal details
- Born: July 2, 1950 (age 76) Morristown, New Jersey, U.S.
- Party: Democratic
- Children: 1
- Education: Nasson College (BA)

Charles Kruger (born July 2, 1950) is an American politician, businessman, and former musician who served as a member of the Maine House of Representatives for the 48th district from 2008 to 2016.

== Early life and education ==
Kruger was born in Morristown, New Jersey. He attended boarding school in New Hope, Pennsylvania, where he became interested in music. After graduating from high school, he moved to New York City and performed as a member of several bands. He established his own band while attending Nasson College in Springvale, Maine, where he earned a Bachelor of Arts degree in education.

== Career ==
After graduating from college, Kruger remained in Maine and began to work as a booking agent around New England. During his career, Kruger booked Chubby Checker, Dixie Chicks, Dwight Yoakam, Clint Black, and The Outlaws. Kruger also organized the Maine Lobster Festival for 32 years. Before retiring from live performance in 1990, Kruger collaborated with Vaughn Meader and Tim Sample.

Kruger became active in politics and raised funds for George J. Mitchell. Kruger was elected to the Maine House of Representatives in 2008 and served until 2016. A resident of Thomaston, he was succeeded in the House by Sara Gideon of Freeport. The district numbers changed due to redistricting.

== Personal life ==
Kruger is married to Linda Kruger, a former postal employee. They have one son.
