= Sanford High School =

Location
- 100 Alumni Boulevard; Sanford, Maine 04073; United States; 43°25′15″N 70°44′56″W

Information
- Principal: Tracy Gibson
- Staff: 67.90 (FTE)
- Grades: 9–12
- Enrolment: 1,099 (2023–2024)
- Student to teacher ratio: 16.19
- Schedule: Mon-Fri
- Colors: Red and White
- Song: Notre Dame Victory March
- Athletics conference: SMAA Class A South (AA South for Basketball)
- Team name: Spartans
- Website: www.sanford.org/o/sanford-high-school

Sanford High School is a public, co-educational, high school in Sanford, Maine, United States.

== History ==
Sanford High began offering secondary-level classes in 1887. It was the first school in Maine to receive both state and New England accreditation, a status it has maintained since.

Before 1969, the school accepted tuition students from nearby towns, but space limitations ended that practice. A new facility, which included a vocational wing that evolved into the Sanford Regional Technical Center, opened in 1970 behind Cobb Stadium.

The final day of classes in the former facility was on October 2, 2018. The current campus, located at 100 Alumni Boulevard, opened on October 10, 2018. The $103 million complex includes expanded technical programs, modern classrooms, performing arts spaces, and updated athletic facilities, including Alumni Stadium. As of the 2017–18 school year, the school served approximately 1,050 students, with additional enrollment from seven sending schools through the regional technical center.

On November 15, 2022, Sanford High School was among several Maine schools targeted by false active shooter reports, leading to a temporary lockdown until authorities secured the building.

== Athletics and activities ==
Sanford High School competes in the Southwestern Maine Athletics Association (SMAA) within Class A of the Maine Principals' Association. The school mascot was changed from the “Redskins” to the “Spartans” in 2012 following a student vote.

The campus athletic facilities include Alumni Stadium (opened in the fall of 2018), used for football, soccer, field hockey, lacrosse, and track and field. Additional facilities include tennis courts, softball fields, and multiple practice areas. Varsity baseball games are held at Goodall Park. Indoor spaces feature two gymnasiums and training areas for wrestling and fitness.

Sanford teams have won multiple state championships, including:

- Football – Class B titles (1956, 1959); Class A title (1998)
- Baseball – Class A title (1978)
- Girls' basketball – Class A title (2006)
- Boys' soccer – Western Maine Class A title (1999)

The Sanford High School Marching Band has participated in regional and national parades and competitions, including the Boston St. Patrick's Day Parade, the New York City St. Patrick's Day Parade, and the 2009 Presidential Inaugural Parade. Students from the Sanford Regional Technical Center have also received recognition in SkillsUSA competitions.

== Notable alumni ==
- John Tuttle, state senator
- Vic Firth, businessman, percussionist
- Randy Brooks, nationally famous trumpeter and orchestra leader
- Rachel Griffin-Accurso, better known as Ms. Rachel, American YouTuber, social media personality, songwriter, and educator
- Peter Kostis, c. 1965, golf broadcaster and instructor
