= Louis B. Goodall Memorial Library =

Coordinates: 43.436°N 70.7731°W

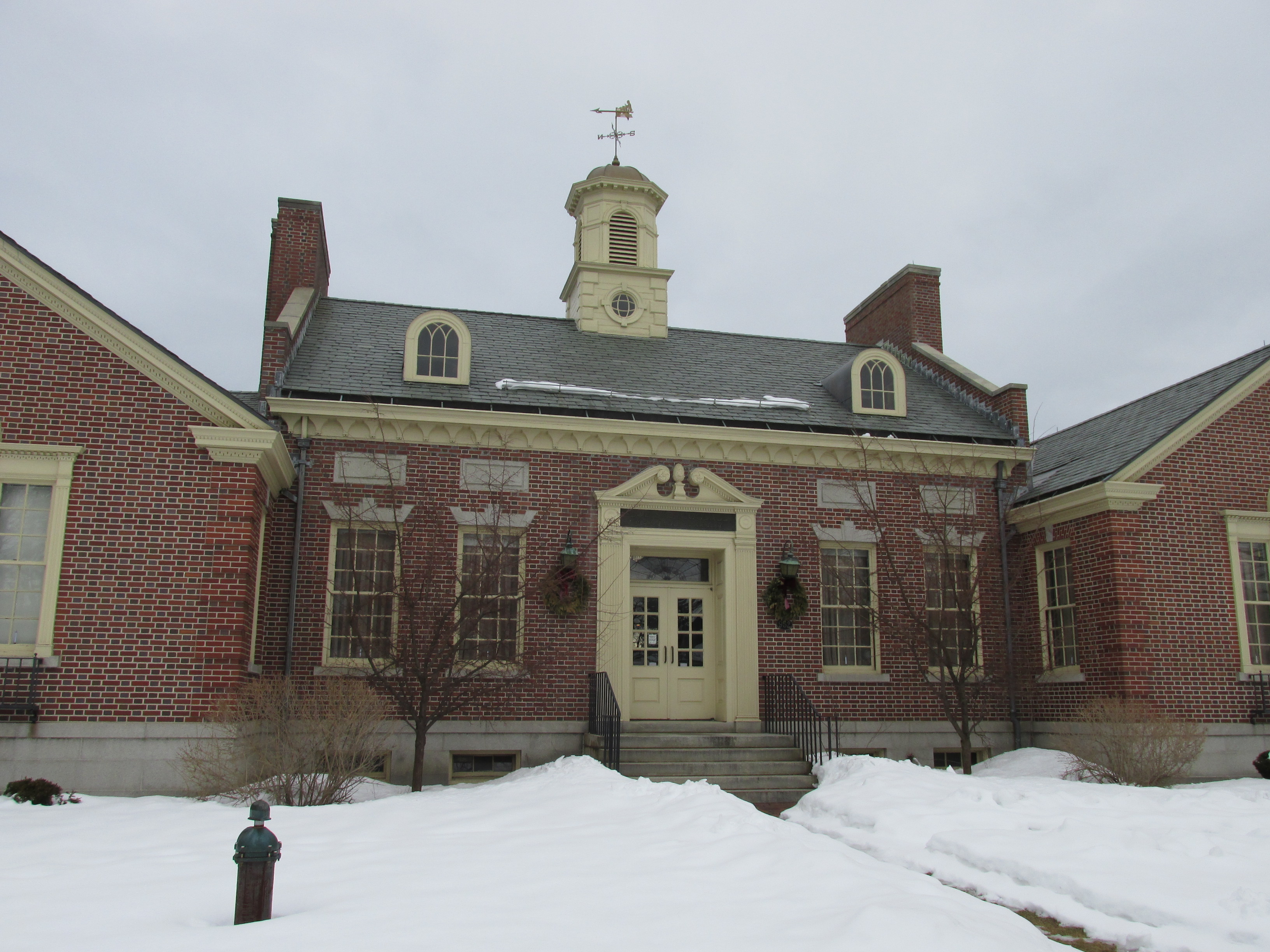
- Location: Sanford, Maine, United States
- Type: Public
- Established: 1898

Collection
- Size: 79,977

Access and use
- Circulation: 103,000
- Population served: 21,253

Other information
- Budget: $534,682
- Employees: 6
- Website: lbgoodall.org

The Louis B. Goodall Memorial Library is the public library serving Sanford, Maine. It is located at 952 Main Street, in an architecturally distinguished Colonial Revival brick building built in 1937, and listed on the National Register of Historic Places in 2008.

== Architecture and history ==
The Goodall Library is located at the northern corner of Main and Elm Streets, just south of Sanford center. The original 1937 Georgian Revival structure is 1-1/2 stories in height, built of brick with a slate roof and cupola. A central horizontal section is flanked by projecting gabled sections on either side. To the rear of this block stands a two-story modern addition built in 1976. The 1937 portion was designed by Portland architect William O. Armitage, and was a gift to the town by Dr. and Mrs. Harvey Thornburgh, named in honor of her father, Louis B. Goodall, who was one of the town's most well-known residents. The building is owned by the city and managed by a board of trustees.

On June 18, 1898, the Sanford Library Association was organized to provide library service to the people of Sanford. Thomas Goodall, first president of the library association, allowed his School Street property to be used as a home for the library. It opened for the circulation of books on December 31, 1898, and on June 1, 1900 the library was made accessible to the general public free of charge.

The Carpentier Branch opened in 1950, but closed due to budget cuts in 1991. The village of Springvale has its own public library Springvale Public Library located 2.5 miles from the Goodall Library.

== See also ==
- National Register of Historic Places listings in York County, Maine
