= Nasson College =

Private college in Springvale, Maine, U.S.

- Motto: Vérité sans peur
- Motto in English: "Truth without fear"
- Type: Private liberal arts college
- Active: 1912–1983
- Location: Springvale, Sanford, Maine, United States; 43°27′56″N 70°47′52″W
- Newspaper: The Nasson Bell
- Colors: Red and white
- Nickname: Lions
- Mascot: Lion

Nasson College was a Private liberal arts college in Springvale, Sanford, Maine, United States. It that was established in 1912 and closed in 1983.

== History ==
The college was founded in 1912 as the Nasson Institute. Nasson Institute offered a two-year women's program, becoming a four-year school in 1935 and co-educational in 1952. Nasson offered majors in such fields as biology, English, environmental science, government, history, mathematics, and medical technology.

=== The New Division ===
In 1963, President Roger C. Gay proposed the possibility of having one or more colleges under the control of Nasson College. The planning and preparation began and, in the fall of 1966, the New Division, an experimental college, was established. The New Division followed the model set by Goddard College and Antioch College, which encouraged extensive student participation in social, academic, and discipline policy and independent study. Like many schools at the time, Nasson hoped to challenge the traditional models of higher education. The New Division operated from a separate, newly constructed building located west of the original campus, containing both housing and community facilities.

The realities of operating two substantially different educational models under the same college umbrella resulted in substantial conflict at Nasson. The old division comprised traditional students and conservative faculty, while the New Division was made up of hippies and more liberal professors.

In 1969, Gay was replaced as president of the college by John S. Bailey. Educational consultants recommended dissolving the New Division and consolidating its programs with the rest of the college, while students in the New Division protested the loss of autonomy. The New Division closed before the 1970 school year.

=== Closure ===
The failure of the New Division made the college risk-averse, and it struggled to respond to shifting enrollment and mounting financial pressures. Several overtures were made between Nasson and the University of New England, but no deal was ever made to merge the institutions. Nasson had been reliant on the Draft during the Vietnam War, both for G.I. Bill students and as a potential haven for those looking to avoid the war. With the end of the war in 1975, student populations dwindled, and the college ran out of funds. Former president of Lake Forest College, William Graham Cole, was president from 1975 to circa 1977. In 1983, Nasson College filed for bankruptcy and closed its doors.

=== Re-opening ===
A new owner, businessman Edward Mattar III, acquired the site and promised to open a new college there by 1985. The second incarnation of Nasson College offered business and management courses. However, it was not successful. The state seized several buildings in 1996 and auctioned them off to a bidder who turned out to be a proxy for Mattar, which led to further legal troubles.

== Campus site after closure ==
Most of the buildings on the original campus have been reused for other purposes. The Nasson Memorial Student Activity Center was acquired by an alumni group and repurposed as a community center in 2002. A community health center opened in a former science building in 2012. In 2022, it was announced that - nearly forty years after the college closed - the last original buildings on campus would become apartments.

== Notable alumni ==
- Beverly Bustin, politician
- Daniel Hobbs, politician
- Charles Kruger, politician, businessman, and former musician
- James Libby, politician, college professor, and author
- Janet Long, politician and educator
- Holly Stover, politician
