= Ms. Rachel =

American YouTuber and educator (born 1982)

- Ms. Rachel in 2026
- Born: Rachel Anne Griffin; November 30, 1982 (age 43); Biddeford, Maine, U.S.
- Education: University of Southern Maine (BA); New York University (MA); American College of Education (MA)
- Occupations: YouTuber; social media personality; educator; activist; singer-songwriter
- Spouse: Aron Accurso (m. 2016)
- Children: 2

YouTube information
- Channel: Ms Rachel - Toddler Learning Videos
- Years active: 2019–present
- Genres: Children's music; education
- Subscribers: 21.5 million
- Views: 17.7 billion
- Last updated: October 8, 2026

Rachel Anne Accurso (née Griffin; born November 30, 1982), better known as Ms. Rachel, is an American children's educator, YouTuber, and activist. She created the YouTube series Ms. Rachel (originally Songs for Littles), which combines original songs and classic children's music with a focus on early language development for infants, toddlers, and preschoolers. As of 2026, the channel has more than 21 million subscribers and over 16 billion views.

Accurso, who holds master's degrees in music education and early childhood education, began the series in 2019 after struggling to find media resources for her son, who had a speech delay. The show became popular during the COVID-19 pandemic and has drawn comparisons to Mister Rogers' Neighborhood for its grounding in childhood development research. Netflix began streaming compilation episodes of Ms. Rachel in 2025 and the series became one of the platform's most-watched children's shows that year. The series received two nominations at the 4th Children's and Family Emmy Awards in 2026. Accurso has also received a Streamy Award and a Kids' Choice Award, among other honors.

Accurso is an activist for children affected by the Gaza war and by immigration detention. Beginning in 2024, she raised funds and publicly advocated for children in Gaza, drawing both support and accusations of antisemitism from several pro-Israel organizations. She has campaigned against U.S. Immigration and Customs Enforcement's detention of migrant children, including petitioning to close a family detention facility and meeting with lawmakers on Capitol Hill in June 2026.

== Early and personal life ==
Accurso was born Rachel Anne Griffin outside of Portland, Maine, in the city of Biddeford, and raised in nearby Sanford. She was raised, along with her sister, by a single mother, and has stated that in her youth they "struggled... to afford things." As a teenager and young adult, she worked a variety of jobs, including working for a summer program for disabled children, teaching music to refugee children through the Boys & Girls Club in Maine, and working as a music teacher at a public preschool in New York City before starting her YouTube channel. She also participated in community theater.

She attended Sanford High School, where she participated in theatre, before she moved and began attending Marshwood High School. She subsequently attended the University of Southern Maine. She earned a master's degree in music education from New York University in 2016 and a second master's degree in early childhood education from the American College of Education.

She met her husband, Broadway music director and composer Aron Accurso, at a Unitarian Universalist Church in New York in 2010. They were married in July 2016. Their first child, a son, was born in 2018. On April 8, 2025, Accurso announced that she and her husband had a second child, a daughter, via surrogacy.

== Career ==
Accurso started her YouTube channel in 2019 under the name Ms. Rachel. She and her husband created the channel in response to the lack of media resources for their son who had a speech delay and did not say his first word until he was two years old. She created Songs for Littles, a children's music YouTube series made up of a combination of classic children's songs, such as nursery rhymes, and original music for infants, toddlers, and preschoolers. It was originally started as an in-person class led by Accurso and was inspired by the techniques of her son's early childhood intervention speech therapist with a focus on language development milestones and inclusive subject matter. The channel became popular in 2020 during the COVID-19 pandemic and has over 21 million subscribers as of 2026.

Songs for Littles features Accurso as the star, with her signature outfit of a pink shirt with overalls and a headband, alongside diverse cast and crew members including actress and teacher Keisha Gilles, diversity and inclusion consultant Alexa Smith, speech therapist Frida Matute, animator and editor Beth Jean, singer-songwriter Jules Hoffman, actress Natalie Kaye Clater, and Accurso's husband Aron, the last of whom writes and arranges music for the series and operates a puppet character named Herbie. Accurso also became popular on TikTok as Ms. Rachel, where she had over two and a half million followers by March 2023.

Accurso's shows are based in research in childhood development. Michael Long, an American religious studies professor and biographer of Fred Rogers, has drawn comparison of Accurso's work to Rogers' show, Mister Rogers' Neighborhood.

Accurso took a break from TikTok in February 2023, citing her mental health. The break was assumed by fans to be in response to backlash from some parents on the platform against Accurso's nonbinary co-star Jules Hoffman for using they/them pronouns. That same month, Accurso returned to TikTok while she and Songs for Littles were signed to Creative Artists Agency. In June 2024, Accurso was the subject of a boycott campaign from conservatives after she posted a video on TikTok wishing viewers a happy Pride Month.

A Ms. Rachel toy line was announced in August 2024, which included a Ms. Rachel doll. The popularity of the doll led to knockoffs being sold prompting Accurso to post a guide on how to identify the real doll. Netflix premiered four interactive episodes of Ms. Rachel on January 27, 2025. For the first six months of 2025, Ms. Rachel was Netflix's seventh most viewed series and its single most viewed season of a children's show. The show frequently ranked on Netflix's Top 10 list. A second season premiered in September 2025.

In August 2026, she released a single, "I Love a Rainbow", and announced it would be the lead single of her debut album. The album, titled I'm So Happy, which includes traditional and original rhymes and songs, was released on September 25, 2026. It debuted at number 16 on the US Billboard 200 albums chart dated October 10, 2026.

== Activism ==
Accurso announced a fundraising campaign in a video published in May 2024 to her TikTok and Instagram accounts. She offered to make videos on Cameo, a website that allows users to pay for a personalized video with a message of their choice, with all revenue from the videos going to Save the Children's emergency fund, mentioning the Gaza Strip, Sudan, Ukraine, and the Democratic Republic of the Congo. In a couple of hours, she had raised over $50,000 from 500 Cameo requests, which she later paused to record the requested videos. She started to lose her voice from recording all of the videos, saying that "I wanted to make each video really long and special", and that she could not bear the thought of a child being disappointed. Accurso stated that she was bullied online in relation to her fundraising for the children of Gaza, stating that she cares "deeply for all children". She soon disabled comments on her YouTube and Instagram accounts.

Accurso has often posted on Instagram about the conditions suffered by children in Gaza due to the war in Gaza, as well as Israel's bombing and blockade of the Gaza Strip. She has called for an end to the bombing and blockade, and for the delivery of humanitarian aid to the civilians and children in Gaza who have been forcibly displaced. In May 2025, she posted a video of herself singing with a 3-year-old double amputee from Gaza who was brought to the US by the Palestine Children's Relief Fund. In an interview with Mehdi Hasan, Accurso reaffirmed her support for the children of Gaza, saying that "It's sad that people try to make it controversial when you speak out for children that are facing immeasurable suffering." She told Democracy Now! that "it is difficult to receive criticism, but ... that pain will never compare to the pain of not speaking out during a genocide". Accurso has also stated that she would not collaborate with anyone who has not spoken out about Gaza. Accurso has also posted on Instagram expressing grief about Israeli families whose children and loved ones were taken hostage by Hamas.

Accurso's pro-Gaza activism has drawn ire from right-wing media and a number of pro-Israel and Jewish advocacy organisations, who have accused her of antisemitism. In one incident, Accurso drew criticism after liking an Instagram comment that said "free America from the Jews"; she later apologized and explained that the like was an accidental misclick. In May 2025, The New York Times cited The New York Post as reporting that the advocacy group StopAntisemitism wrote a letter to Attorney General Pam Bondi asking her to investigate whether Accurso was receiving funding to support Hamas. Accurso wrote to The New York Times that "This accusation is not only absurd, it's patently false," and "caring about children in Gaza is a direct continuation of the work I've been doing most of my life. We don't care about only some of our students because of where those students were born, we care about every one of them." Later that year, she announced that she was "unsubscribing from The New York Times because of its biased and dehumanizing coverage of Palestinians and Palestine, and its failure to uphold journalistic integrity."

In December 2025, she became a member of Zohran Mamdani's inauguration committee. In January 2026, not long after Mamdani announced universal childcare for two-year-olds, she joined with him to visit a preschool in New York City, where the two sang to children. In January 2026, Accurso curated an exhibition of artwork created by children in Gaza titled Colours That Survived at the Caelum Gallery in Chelsea, Manhattan, with all proceeds donated to the artists.

Accurso has spoken out against U.S. Immigration and Customs Enforcement (ICE) and its detaining children. She launched a petition to close the Dilley Immigration Processing Center, a facility used to hold women and children, which gained over 324,000 signatures. She visited Capitol Hill on June 9, 2026, to speak to representatives about the conditions children faced and brought letters and drawings from the children being detained there.

On August 11, 2026, Accurso posted a request to hear about Black-owned businesses, and reposted two of the responses, from the owners of a coffee bar and a bakery. This resulted in large increases to their customer base. In September 2026, she announced she would match Macklemore's $1 million donation to Palestinian aid, giving to the Palestine Children's Relief Fund, following Macklemore's donation amid the Macklemore–Ed Sheeran tour controversy. She wrote on Instagram, "I invite every wealthy white celebrity to match it and speak out against the genocide in Gaza." She also criticized Sheeran for his actions.

== Awards and nominations ==
=== Emmy Awards ===
Year	Category	Work	Result	Ref.
Children's and Family Emmy Awards
2026	Outstanding Preschool, Children's or Family Viewing Series	Ms. Rachel – Toddler Learning Videos YouTube Channel	Nominated	
2026	Outstanding Writing for a Preschool or Children's Series	"Potty Training with Ms. Rachel"	Nominated	

=== Miscellaneous awards ===
Year	Award	Category	Nominee	Result	Ref.
2023	Streamy Awards	Kids and Family	Herself	Won	
2024	New York University	Dorothy Height Distinguished Alumni Award	Herself	Honored	
2025	Kids' Choice Awards	Fan Favorite Kids' Creator	Herself	Won	
2025	Glamour Awards	Woman of the Year (shared with Pat McGrath, Lexie Hull, Napheesa Collier, Jonquel Jones, Nyara Sabally and Satou Sabally)	Herself	Honored	
