= Jane Lord Hersom =

American physician

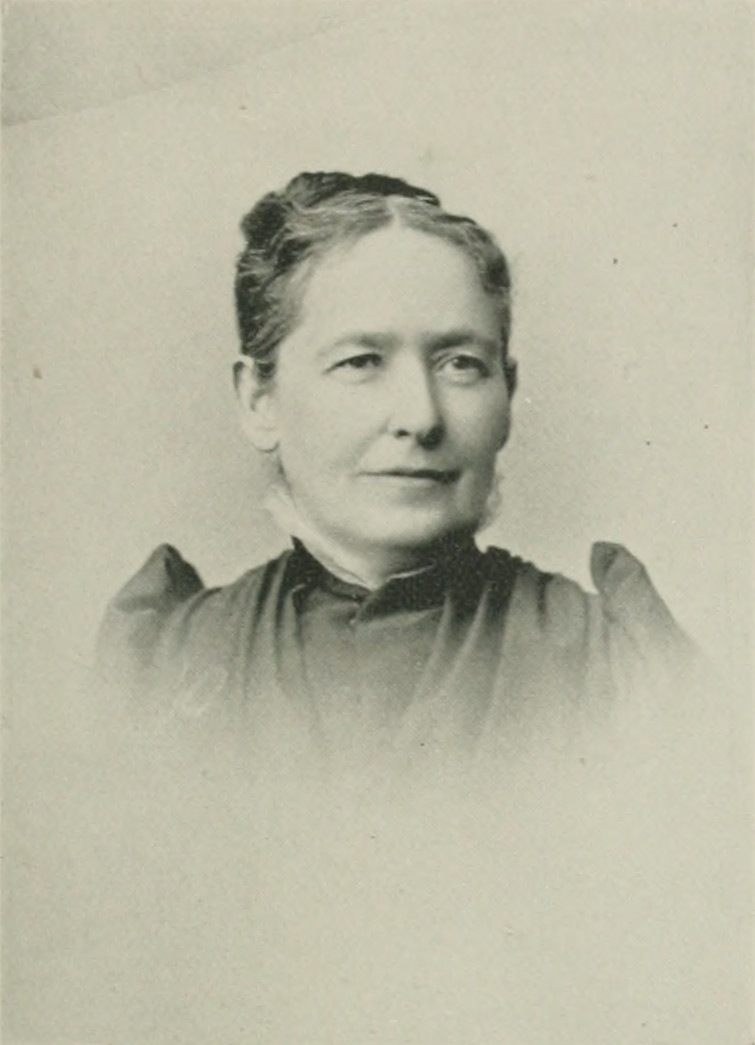
- Portrait of Jane Lord Hersom from "A Woman of the Century"
- Born: August 6, 1840; Sanford, Maine
- Died: November 29, 1928 (aged 88); Portland, Maine
- Education: Woman's Medical College of Pennsylvania
- Occupations: physician, suffragist

Jane Lord Hersom (August 6, 1840 – November 29, 1928) was an American physician and suffragist.

== Early life and education ==
Jane Lord was born in Sanford, Maine, August 6, 1840. Her father and mother, Samuel and Sophia Hight (Smith) Lord, were of English descent.

She was educated in public and private schools in Springvale, Maine, where the family had removed. She began to teach before she was sixteen, going to school in the fall and winter and teaching in the summer.

== Career ==
In 1865, when she was 25 years of age, Jane Lord married Dr. Nahum Alvah Hersom. They settled in Farmington, New Hampshire. In 1862, Dr. Hersom, entered the army as an assistant surgeon, was promoted to first surgeon, and afterwards had charge of a field hospital during the American Civil War.

After the war, Nahum Hersom opened a country practice. His strength soon waned, and he took a five year leave from his practice. The Hersoms then moved to Portland, Maine, where Nahum soon acquired a demanding practice. In 1881, Nahum Hersom went abroad for needed rest and died in Dublin, Ireland, one week after arriving.

Jane Hersom had read medical works to her husband during his sickness, and enjoying them, continued to read them on her own. Her husband had reportedly told her often that she would make a fine physician. Hersom began studying medicine with Professor Stephen H. Weeks, of Portend, Maine. In 1883, she entered the Woman's Medical College of Pennsylvania in Philadelphia, where she studied for three years.

After earning her medical degree, Hersom established a successful medical practice in Portland. She was elected physician of the Temporary Home for Women and Children in Portland, a position she held for four years, until she was obliged to resign in order to attend to her other duties. She was a member of the American Medical Association, and the State and County Medical Societies. In 1896, Hersom served as president of the Pediatrics section of the Maine Academy of Medicine and Science. She was also a member of the Practitioner's Club, of which she was elected president in 1892. She was a contributor of medical papers in societies and clubs and in literary clubs.

Hersom was also an active member of the Woman's Suffrage Association. She became a suffragist through her exigence as a student and physician. She served as treasurer of the Maine State Woman's Suffrage Association, and president of the Portland Equal Suffrage Club.

In religion, Hersom was a Congregationalist; in politics, a Republican. She was a member of the Civic Club, Woman's Literary Union, and Monday Club.

== Personal life ==
The Hersoms had two children, a daughter, Mabel Lord (Mrs. Rufus Harton Jones), and a child who died in infancy.

She died in Portland, Maine, November 29, 1928.
