= Maine State Route 97 =

State highway in Knox County, Maine, US

State Route 97

Route information
- Maintained by MaineDOT
- Length: 9.49 mi (15.27 km)
- Existed: 1949–present

Major junctions
- South end: SR 220 in Friendship
- North end: US 1 in Warren

Location
- Country: United States
- State: Maine
- Counties: Knox

Highway system
- Maine State Highway System; Interstate; US; State; Auto trails; Lettered highways
← SR 96	→ SR 98

State Route 97 (SR 97) is part of Maine's system of numbered state highways, located near the southern coastline. It runs 9 1/2 miles (15.3 km) from an intersection with SR 220 in Friendship to an intersection with U.S. Route 1 (US 1) in Warren.

== Route description ==
SR 97 begins in the town of Friendship. Its southern terminus is located at the intersection of SR 220 (Main Street and Waldoboro Road), located in the center of town. SR 220, of which SR 97 is its former alignment, has its southern terminus here. SR 97 proceeds northeast out of town, passes through Cushing, and then enters Warren, where it ends at US 1 near the Oyster River, just west of Thomaston.

The Maine State Prison is located on SR 97 in Warren, near the Cushing town line.

== History ==
All of SR 97 was formerly part of SR 220. When it was first established in 1929, SR 220 existed as a strange V-shaped route in its southernmost stretch from Waldoboro to Warren (via Friendship). This meant that a motorist heading north from Friendship to Warren, on what is now SR 97 north, would have been traveling southbound on SR 220.

In 1949, this problem was rectified by truncating SR 220 to its current southern terminus and redesignating the eastern leg of the "V" as SR 97.

=== Southern terminus of SR 97 ===
The southern terminus of SR 97 is defined as being on Harbor Road near its intersection with Davis Point Road, almost one mile south of its intersection with SR 220. However, there is no indication of this in the field, as no signage for SR 97 exists on Harbor Road. In addition, its defined length, 9.5 miles (15.3 km), is equal to the distance between SR 220 and US 1 in Warren and is confirmed by the route's signage.

== Junction list ==
The entire route is in Knox County.

Location	mi	km	Destinations	Notes
Friendship	0.00	0.00	SR 220 north (Waldoboro Road) – Waldoboro, Washington	Southern terminus of SR 220
Warren	9.49	15.27	US 1 (Atlantic Highway) to SR 131 – Thomaston, Rockland	
1.000 mi = 1.609 km; 1.000 km = 0.621 mi
