= Jules Hoffman =

- Born: July 13, 1992 (age 34); Fort Worth, Texas, U.S.
- Origin: New York City, U.S.
- Genres: Children's music
- Instruments: Vocals, guitar
- Years active: 2018–present

Jules Hoffman (born July 13, 1992) is an American children's musician and content creator, best known for their role on the YouTube channel Songs for Littles. They are nonbinary and use they/them pronouns, and have gained recognition by their inclusive approach to children's music, emphasizing emotional expression and diversity. In 2024, they released their debut album Jamming with Jules!, which blends rock, folk, and children's music.

== Early life and education ==
Hoffman was born on July 13, 1992 in Fort Worth, Texas. From an early age, they began questioning their body and gender identity, recalling their first awareness at the age of 3. They developed an interest in music at an early age, influenced by their parents' musical tastes, including artists like Carole King and James Taylor, as well as favorite children's shows like Sesame Street and Arthur. Hoffman began playing music and writing songs at age five. At 17, they came out as gay to their family, who were supportive, especially their father. Hoffman continued to search for language to describe their gender identity and, a decade later, began identifying as transgender and nonbinary. They attended Berklee College of Music, where they earned a degree in songwriting.

== Career ==
Hoffman’s career in children’s entertainment began in 2018 when they responded to a job posting for a performer in a children's music class in New York City. With a background in music, playing instruments such as the guitar, piano, trombone, and drums, they submitted original songs and were hired by Ms. Rachel, the creator of Songs for Littles.

The in-person music classes soon transitioned to YouTube, where Songs for Littles became widely successful. The channel gained popularity during the COVID-19 pandemic, amassing over 3 million subscribers and producing videos teaching baby sign language, nursery rhymes, and various educational topics. Hoffman’s energetic and creative presence contributed to the channel's appeal.

Hoffman faced backlash over their nonbinary identity. Some parents expressed concerns, claiming that the show introduced the concept of they/them pronouns to young audiences. Hoffman addressed the backlash, emphasizing the importance of focusing on the positive impact their work has on children and families.

Hoffman started a YouTube channel, Jules!, where they post children's music videos. In 2024, they released their debut album Jamming with Jules!, featuring songs like "Crabby Crab," "Pizza Party," and "Caterpillar Butterfly Thing." The album incorporates social-emotional concepts, encouraging both children and adults to embrace their emotions. Hoffman collaborated with their former band, Boketto the Wolf, and worked with producer Catho to create the album. The project aimed to appeal to parents as well, combining professional instrumentation with fun, child-friendly content.

== Personal life ==
Hoffman has spoken openly about their gender identity and their experiences growing up as a nonbinary person. They have also advocated for human rights in Qatar and elsewhere. They maintain a close relationship with their family, including their parents, who have made efforts to understand and respect Hoffman's pronouns. Hoffman often draws inspiration from their niece and nephews, whom they affectionately refer to as "niblings". After living in New York City, as of 2024, Hoffman resides in New Mexico.
