= Maine State Route 98 =

State highway in York County, Maine, US

State Route 98

Route information
- Maintained by MaineDOT
- Length: 2.79 mi (4.49 km)
- Existed: 1946–present

Major junctions
- West end: US 1 in Saco
- East end: SR 5 in Old Orchard Beach

Location
- Country: United States
- State: Maine
- Counties: York

Highway system
- Maine State Highway System; Interstate; US; State; Auto trails; Lettered highways
← SR 97	→ SR 99

State Route 98 (SR 98) is a short state highway in southwestern Maine. It is a 2.8-mile-long (4.5 km) connection between the city of Saco and Old Orchard Beach between U.S. Route 1 (US 1) and SR 5. SR 98 is signed as an east–west highway although its orientation is more northwest-to-southeast.

== Route description ==
SR 98 begins in Saco at an intersection with US 1. It proceeds southeast into Old Orchard Beach, passing by the Dunegrass Golf Club before meeting its eastern terminus at SR 5 just short of SR 5's southern terminus at SR 9 on the coastline. The Old Orchard Beach Town Hall and Inn are located near the intersection of SR 5 and SR 98. SR 98 does not intersect any numbered routes between its endpoints.

== History ==
The route between Saco and Old Orchard Beach was originally designated as SR 6 in 1937. The SR 6 designation was removed in 1946, when SR 6 was moved to its current routing. Former SR 6 was then designated as SR 98, and the routing has not changed since.

== Major intersections ==
The entire route is in York County.

Location	mi	km	Destinations	Notes
Saco	0.00	0.00	US 1 (Portland Road) – Saco, Scarborough	Western terminus
Old Orchard Beach	2.79	4.49	SR 5 (Saco Avenue / Old Orchard Street) to SR 9 – Saco	Eastern terminus
1.000 mi = 1.609 km; 1.000 km = 0.621 mi
