= Maine State Route 109 =

State highway in York County, Maine, US

State Route 109

Route information
- Maintained by MaineDOT
- Length: 26.24 mi (42.23 km)
- Existed: 1925–present

Major junctions
- South end: US 1 / SR 9 in Wells
- I-95 / Maine Turnpike in Wells; SR 9 in Wells; SR 4 / SR 4A in Sanford; US 202 / SR 4A / SR 11 in Sanford; SR 11 in Shapleigh
- North end: NH 109 at the New Hampshire state line near Acton

Location
- Country: United States
- State: Maine
- Counties: York

Highway system
- Maine State Highway System; Interstate; US; State; Auto trails; Lettered highways
← SR 108	→ SR 110

State Route 109 (SR 109) is a state highway in the U.S. state of Maine. It is a 26.24-mile (42.23 km) regional route connecting the southern coastal area to inland areas to the north and west. Its southern terminus is at U.S. Route 1 and State Route 9 in Wells and its northern terminus is at the New Hampshire border in Acton, where it connects to New Hampshire Route 109. The highway runs through York County; major towns and cities along the length of SR 109 include Wells and Sanford.

== Route description ==
SR 109 begins in Wells at the southern junction of US 1 and SR 9. It is cosigned with SR 9 for the southernmost 2.17 miles (3.49 km) of its length and interchanges with the Maine Turnpike (I-95) at exit 19. SR 9 splits off to the west and SR 109 crosses SR 9A before entering the city of Sanford. In the southern end of Sanford, SR 109 meets the western end of SR 99, then crosses SR 4 at a roundabout. SR 109 becomes cosigned with SR 4A and the highway proceeds towards downtown. In downtown Sanford, SR 4A/SR 109 meets US 202/SR 11 at Lebanon and Winter Streets. SR 4A turns northeast to join US 202 eastbound towards Alfred, while SR 11 turns northwest to join SR 109 northbound. SR 11/SR 109 continues northwest through the Springvale neighborhood, crossing SR 11A and SR 224. The highway continues into the town of Shapleigh, where SR 11 splits off to the north near Mousam Lake just south of the Acton border. SR 109 continues northwest through Acton. North of Acton, SR 109 crosses the Salmon Falls River into Wakefield, New Hampshire and becomes NH 109.

== History ==
SR 109 was designated on Maine's first state highway map in 1925 and still maintains its original routing. Its three-digit number indicates that it was originally an intrastate route, abruptly ending at the New Hampshire state line until NH 109 was later designated. SR 109 is now a multi-state route with NH 109.

== Major intersections ==
The entire route is in York County.

Location	mi	km	Destinations	Notes
Wells	0.00	0.00	US 1 / SR 9 east (Post Road) – Kennebunk, Ogunquit	Southern terminus; southern end of SR 9 concurrency
Wells	1.56	2.51	I-95 / Maine Turnpike – Portland, Augusta, Kittery, Boston	Exit 19 on I-95 / Turnpike
Wells	2.17	3.49	SR 9 west (North Berwick Road) – North Berwick, Berwick	Northern end of SR 9 concurrency
Wells	2.56	4.12	SR 9A (Crediford Road / Branch Road) – North Berwick, Kennebunk	
Sanford	8.54	13.74	SR 99 east (Kennebunk Road) – Kennebunk	Western terminus of SR 99
Sanford	11.13	17.91	SR 4 (Country Club Road / Alfred Road) – Alfred SR 4A begins	Rotary; southern terminus of SR 4A
Sanford	13.95	22.45	US 202 / SR 11 south / SR 4A north (Lebanon Street / Winter Street) – Alfred, Rochester, NH	Northern end of SR 4A concurrency; southern end of SR 11 concurrency
Sanford	15.99	25.73	SR 11A south (Oak Street) / SR 224 east (Bridge Street) – Alfred, Lebanon	Northern terminus of SR 11A; western terminus of SR 224
Shapleigh	20.16	32.44	SR 11 north (Shapleigh Corner Road) – Shapleigh, Newfield	Northern end of SR 11 concurrency
Acton	26.24	42.23	NH 109 north (Lovell Lake Road) – Wakefield, NH	Continuation into New Hampshire
1.000 mi = 1.609 km; 1.000 km = 0.621 mi: Concurrency terminus; Tolled
