= Littlefield River =

Coordinates: 43.45925°N 70.70478°W

Location
- Country: United States

Physical characteristics
- Source
  - location: Shaker Pond, Alfred, Maine
- Mouth
  - location: Alfred, Maine

The Littlefield River is a 3.8-mile-long (6.1 km) tributary of the Middle Branch Mousam River in York County, Maine. Via the Middle Branch and the Mousam River, its waters flow to the Atlantic Ocean.

The river is entirely within the town of Alfred, rising at the outlet of Shaker Pond north of the town center and flowing south to the Middle Branch of the Mousam River, south of the town center.

== See also ==
- List of rivers of Maine
