= John Tuttle (politician) =

American politician, Maine (1951–2022)

Member of the Maine Senate
- In office December 1984 – December 1988
- In office December 5, 2012 – December 3, 2014
- Preceded by: Jonathan Courtney
- Succeeded by: David Woodsome

Member of the Maine House of Representatives
- In office December 1978 – December 1984
- In office December 1994 – December 2002
- In office December 2004 – December 2012
- In office December 2020 – January 28, 2022

Personal details
- Born: February 24. 1951 Rochester, New Hampshire, U.S.
- Died: January 28, 2022 (aged 70) Biddeford, Maine, U.S.
- Party: Democratic
- Spouse: Ann Tuttle

John Lawrence Tuttle Jr. (February 24, 1951 – January 28, 2022) was an American politician from Maine.

Tuttle served as a Democratic State Senator from Maine's 3rd District, representing part of York County including his residence of Sanford. He was first elected to the Maine House of Representatives in 1978, serving until 1984 when he successfully sought to represent Sanford and the surrounding towns in the State Senate. He served in the State Senate until 1988. He returned to the House in 1994 serving through 2002. He served again the House from 2004 to 2012. He was unable to run for re-election due to term limits in 2002 and 2012. In 2012, He successfully ran for the State Senate to replace Republican Jonathan Courtney, who ran for U.S. Congress. In the general election, he defeated fellow Sanford High School Class of 1970 alumnus Brad Littlefield. He was defeated for re-election in 2014 by Waterboro Republican David Woodsome. He was again elected to the House in 2020.

Tuttle was born in Rochester, New Hampshire, on February 24, 1951, He graduated from Sanford High School, in Sanford, Maine, in 1970. He earned a B.A. from the University of Maine Presque Isle and a Master's in Public Accounting (Finance) from the University of Maine in 1992. He was a veteran of the Maine Army National Guard and a former medical emergency technician with the Sanford Fire Department.

Tuttle died at Southern Maine Health Care in Biddeford, Maine, on January 28, 2022, aged 70, after a long illness.
