= Harvey Butler Memorial Rhododendron Sanctuary =

Nature reserve in Springvale, Maine, United States

Coordinates: 43.4327°N 70.8234°W

- Interactive map of Harvey Butler Memorial Rhododendron Sanctuary

The Harvey Butler Memorial Rhododendron Sanctuary 30 acres (121,000 m^{2}) is a nature reserve located on Route 11A, Springvale, Maine, United States. The sanctuary is open to the public, and is owned by the Native Plant Trust, formerly the New England Wild Flower Society, which also maintains the Garden in the Woods.

The sanctuary contains a 5.3 acre (21,000 m^{2}) stand of Great Laurel (Rhododendron maximum), Spice Bush, Clintonia, Painted trillium, and at least 39 species of wildflowers.

== See also ==
- List of botanical gardens in the United States
