= American College of Education =

Private, for-profit online college based in Indianapolis, Indiana, US

Coordinates: 39°46′10.8″N 86°09′36.7″W

- Type: Private for-profit online college
- Established: 2005; 21 years ago
- President: Jodi Feikema (Interim President)
- Faculty: 650
- Students: 14,263
- Undergraduates: 359
- Postgraduates: 13,508
- Location: Indianapolis, Indiana, United States
- Website: www.ace.edu

American College of Education (ACE) is a private, for-profit online college based in Indianapolis, Indiana, specializing in education, business, healthcare, and nursing programs. Established in 2005, the college is accredited by the Higher Learning Commission and offers bachelor's completion, master's, doctorate, and specialist degree programs, as well as graduate certificates.

== History ==
American College of Education was formally incorporated in Illinois on February 25, 2005. Following incorporation, it purchased the academic programming intellectual property of Barat College. American College of Education immediately applied to the Higher Learning Commission to continue the accreditation of Barat College under its new name and ownership. The Higher Learning Commission approved this request in March 2006.

ACE began offering Ed.D and Ed.S programs in 2013.

In March 2016, American College of Education announced a partnership with the National Institute for STEM Education (NISE) and Accelerate Learning, inventors of STEMScopes, to provide a pathway to STEM certification and degree programs. Educators who earn the National Certificate for STEM Teaching from NISE are able to transfer their certificate coursework to American College of Education to complete an M.Ed. in STEM Leadership.

In September 2016, American College of Education received its Certified B Corporation distinction from the nonprofit B Lab, becoming the first Certified B Corporation and Benefit Corporation in the state of Indiana. The college was recertified in 2019, 2022, and June 2023. As of 2026, ACE is no longer a Certified B Corporation. The college's previous Certified B Corp status reflected its partnerships with nonprofit organizations, including Kids in Need Foundation, Crayons to Computers, A Gift for Teaching, and Teachers' Treasures.

In support of its expanding healthcare offerings, American College of Education announced a transfer agreement with Ivy Tech Community College in April 2018, allowing Ivy Tech students who earn associate of science or associate of applied science degrees in the School of Health Sciences to transfer to American College of Education to complete a Bachelor of Science in Healthcare Administration.

In June 2018, the college formally announced its intention to expand into the nursing field with the RN to MSN program, a pathway program that allows registered nurses to complete both a Bachelor of Science in Nursing (BSN) and a Master of Science in Nursing (MSN) degree in a three-year span. The first cohort of the nursing program sat during the August 2018 term.

In February 2019, a Master of Special Education was added to the college's program offerings.

In April 2023, the college partnered with the Association of School Business Officials (ASBO), Lexia Aspire, and the National Virtual Teacher Association (NVTA); these partnerships allow ASBO, Aspire, and NVTA members to receive tuition reduction grants that apply toward ACE's master's and doctoral programs.

== Academics ==
American College of Education offers master's degrees, doctoral and specialist degree programs, and bachelor's degree completion programs specializing in education, business, healthcare, and nursing. It receives no federal, state, or local government funding.

According to ACE's 2026 Student Right to Know report, the college's graduation rate is approximately 83.9 percent. Although ACE is eligible to participate in Title IV funding, the college does not participate and claims that this reduces its educational costs. U.S. News & World Report has profiled ACE among lower-cost online colleges, with tuition described as approximately one-third the cost of comparable programs.

=== Education ===
ACE offers bachelor's, master's, education specialist, and doctoral degrees in education, as well as graduate certificates. Programs include specializations in curriculum and instruction, early childhood education, instructional technology, literacy, STEM education, teaching English learners, special education, and educational leadership. The college also offers several graduate-level certificates, including programs in English as a Second Language, Bilingual Education, and Content Area Instruction.

=== Healthcare ===
ACE offers bachelor's, master's, education specialist, and doctoral degrees in healthcare. Programs include a Bachelor of Science in Healthcare Administration, a Master of Healthcare Administration, a Master of Public Health, and a Doctor of Education in Public Health Education.

=== Nursing ===
ACE offers an RN to BSN, BSN to MSN, and RN to MSN pathway for registered nurses. In June 2018, the college formally expanded into the nursing field with the RN to MSN program, allowing registered nurses to complete both a Bachelor of Science in Nursing (BSN) and a Master of Science in Nursing (MSN) in a three-year span.

=== Business ===
ACE offers bachelor's, master's, education specialist, and doctoral programs in business and organizational leadership. Programs include a Master of Business Administration (MBA), a Master of Science in Organizational Leadership, and a Doctor of Education in Leadership.

=== Accreditation ===
The college is accredited by the Higher Learning Commission (HLC). ACE's initial level programs, Professional Education Programs, as well as its advanced level program, are also accredited by the Council for the Accreditation of Educator Preparation (CAEP). The Bachelor of Science in Nursing and Master of Science in Nursing programs are accredited by the Commission on Collegiate Nursing Education (CCNE).

== Awards and recognition ==
American College of Education has received recognition for its workplace practices and educational impact. The college was named to the Indiana Chamber of Commerce's "Best Places to Work" list in 2017, 2018, 2019, 2020, and 2021. In 2018, ACE also received the When Work Works Award from the Society for Human Resource Management.

ACE has been recognized by Energage and USA Today with the Top Workplaces USA award for five consecutive years from 2022 through 2026. In 2025, the college received additional designations from Energage as a Top Workplace in the Education Industry and a Top Workplace for Remote Work.

In 2023, ACE received the Corporate Volunteerism Award from the Indiana Department of Workforce Development's Serve Indiana program. In 2026, the college was included on the GSV 150, an annual list compiled by GSV Ventures of public and private companies in digital learning and workforce skills.
