= Goodall Park =

Baseball venue in Sanford, Maine, U.S.

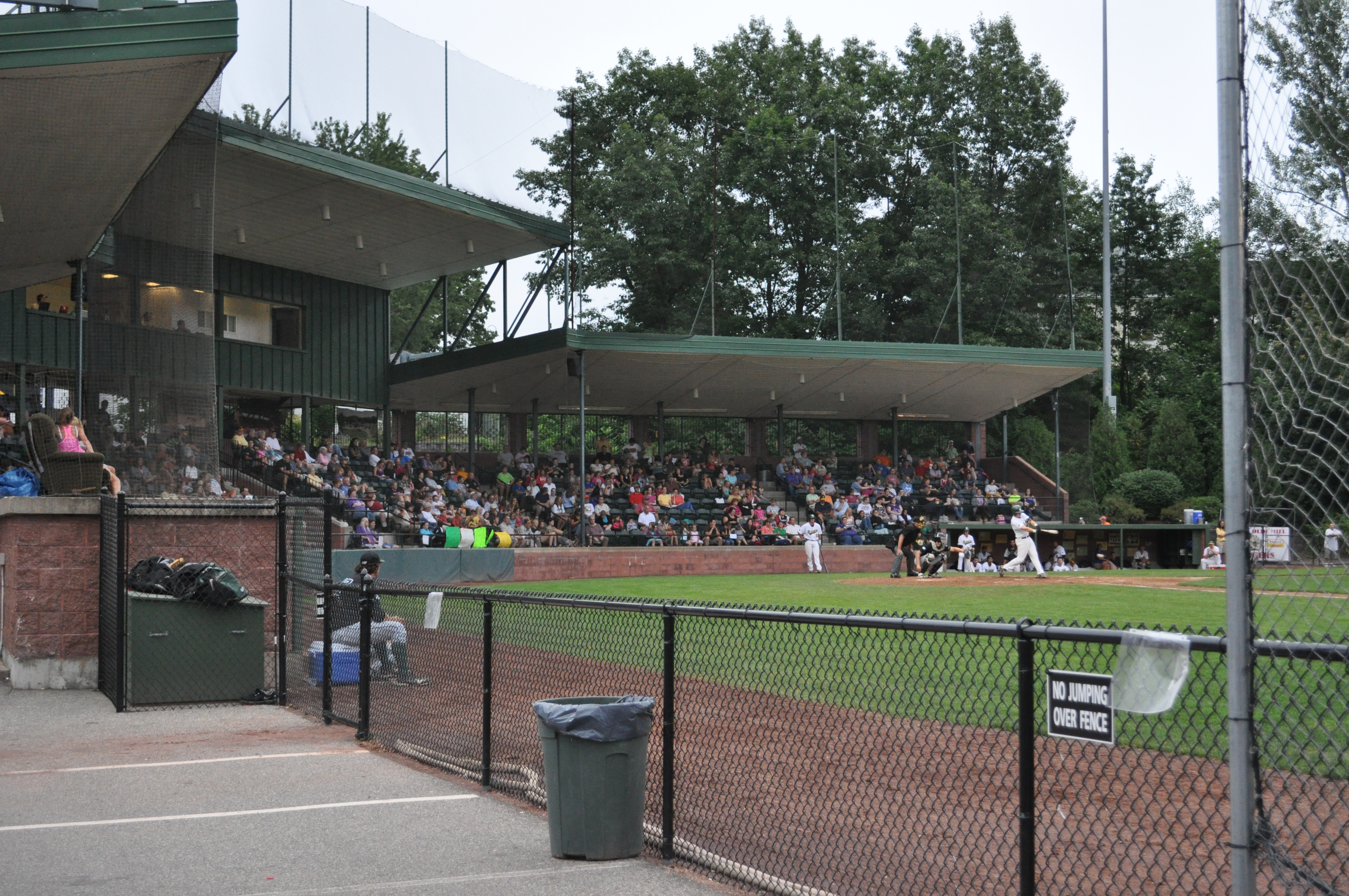
- Interactive map of Goodall Park
- Location: Roberts Street, Sanford, Maine, USA
- Coordinates: 43.436286°N 70.777096°W
- Capacity: 950
- Surface: Natural grass
- Scoreboard: Electronic
- Field size: Left Field: 321 feet (98 m); Left Center Field: 346 feet (105 m); Deep Left Center Field: 378 feet (115 m); Center Field: 404 feet (123 m); Deep Right Center Field: 384 feet (117 m); Right Center Field: 350 feet (110 m); Right Field: 283 feet (86 m)

Construction
- Opened: May 29, 1915
- Renovated: 2003

Tenant
- Sanford Mainers (NECBL) (2002–present)

Goodall Park is a baseball venue in Sanford, Maine, United States, which is home to the Sanford Mainers of the New England Collegiate Baseball League. The park opened in 1915. It has a seating capacity of 950 spectators.

== History ==
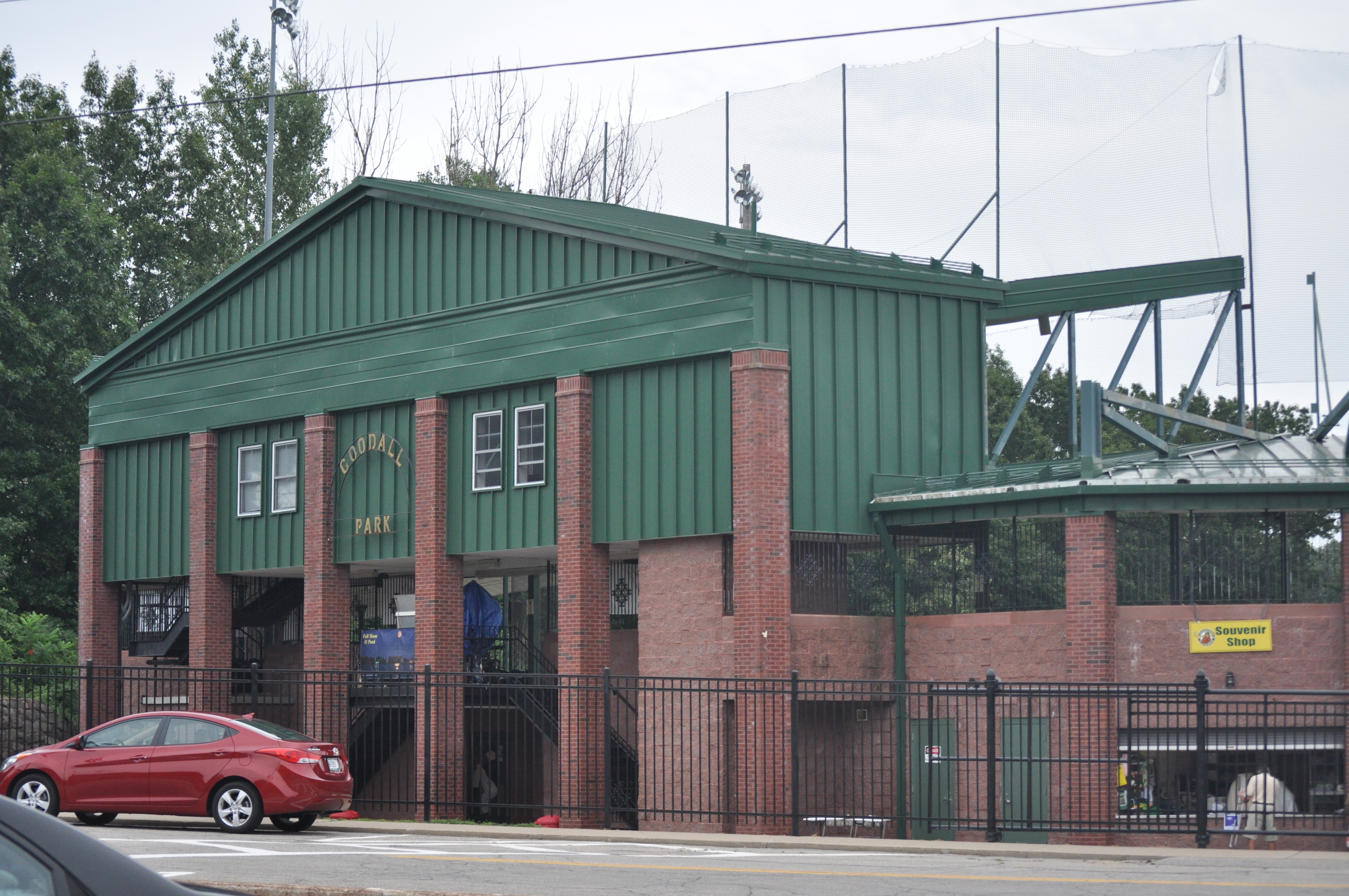
The rear of the park's rebuilt grandstand.

The park opened on May 29, 1915. Its first game was between the Sanford Professionals and the Lewiston Pilgrims (of Lewiston, Maine). The game was played in front of 1,300 fans.

In 1919, the park hosted an exhibition game between the Sanford Professionals and the Boston Red Sox. The game was Babe Ruth's last game in a Red Sox uniform. Ruth hit a three-run home run to lead the Red Sox to a come-from-behind 4-3 victory. Ruth did not play in another game for the Red Sox before being traded to the New York Yankees by Red Sox owner Harry Frazee.

=== 1997 fire and rebuilding ===
In 1997, an arsonist set fire to the park's grandstand and destroyed it. After debate in Sanford as to whether or not to rebuild the park, the grandstand was rebuilt in 1998 and rededicated on July 16, 1999. The grandstand was rebuilt at a cost of over $1 million.

=== Seating areas ===
Most of the park's 950-spectator capacity comes from the grandstand located directly behind home plate. The grandstand consists entirely of chairbacked seats. The park also has a section of metal bleacher seating located down the first base line.

== Photo gallery ==
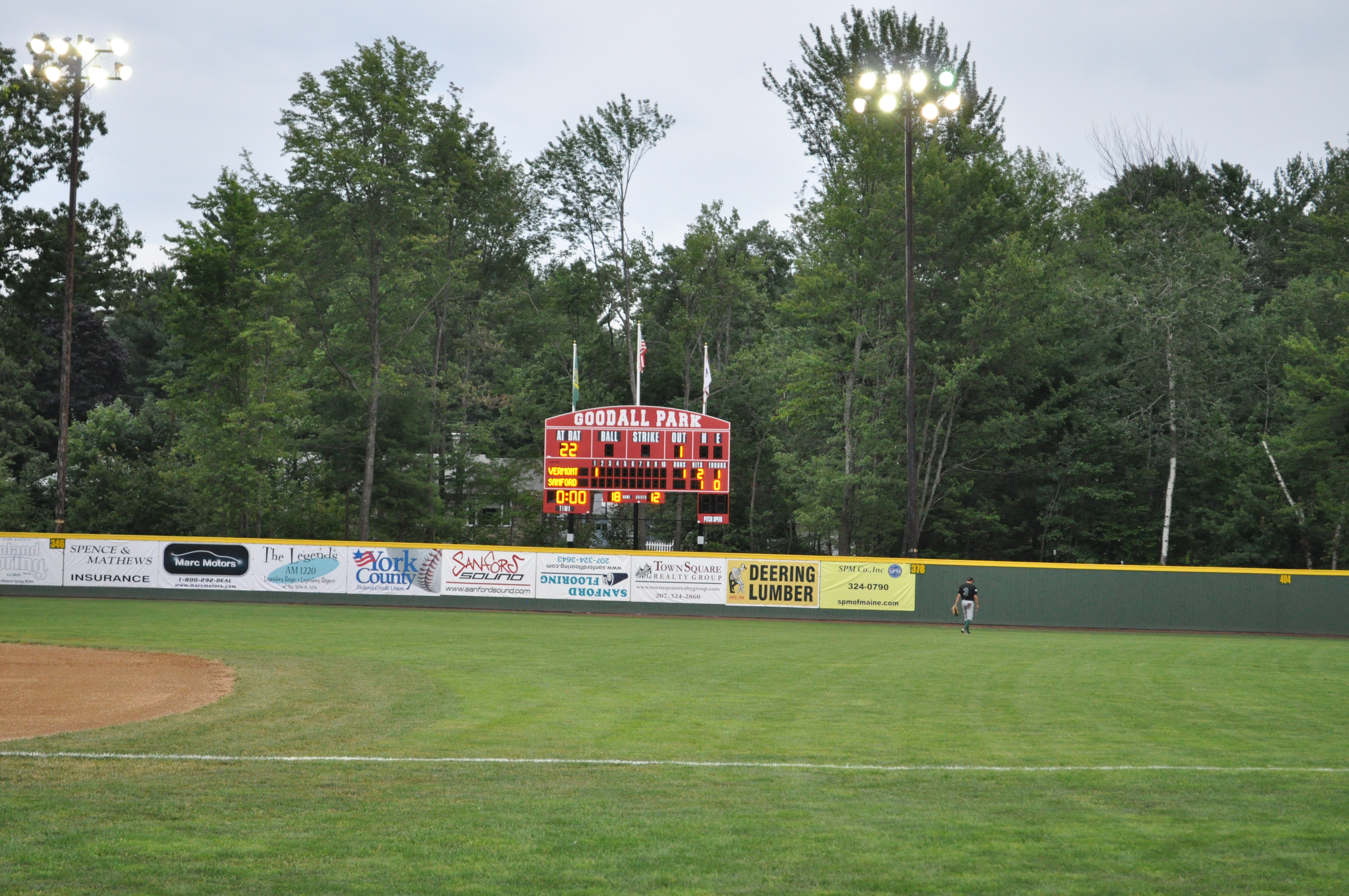
The park's electronic scoreboard, located over the left center field fence.

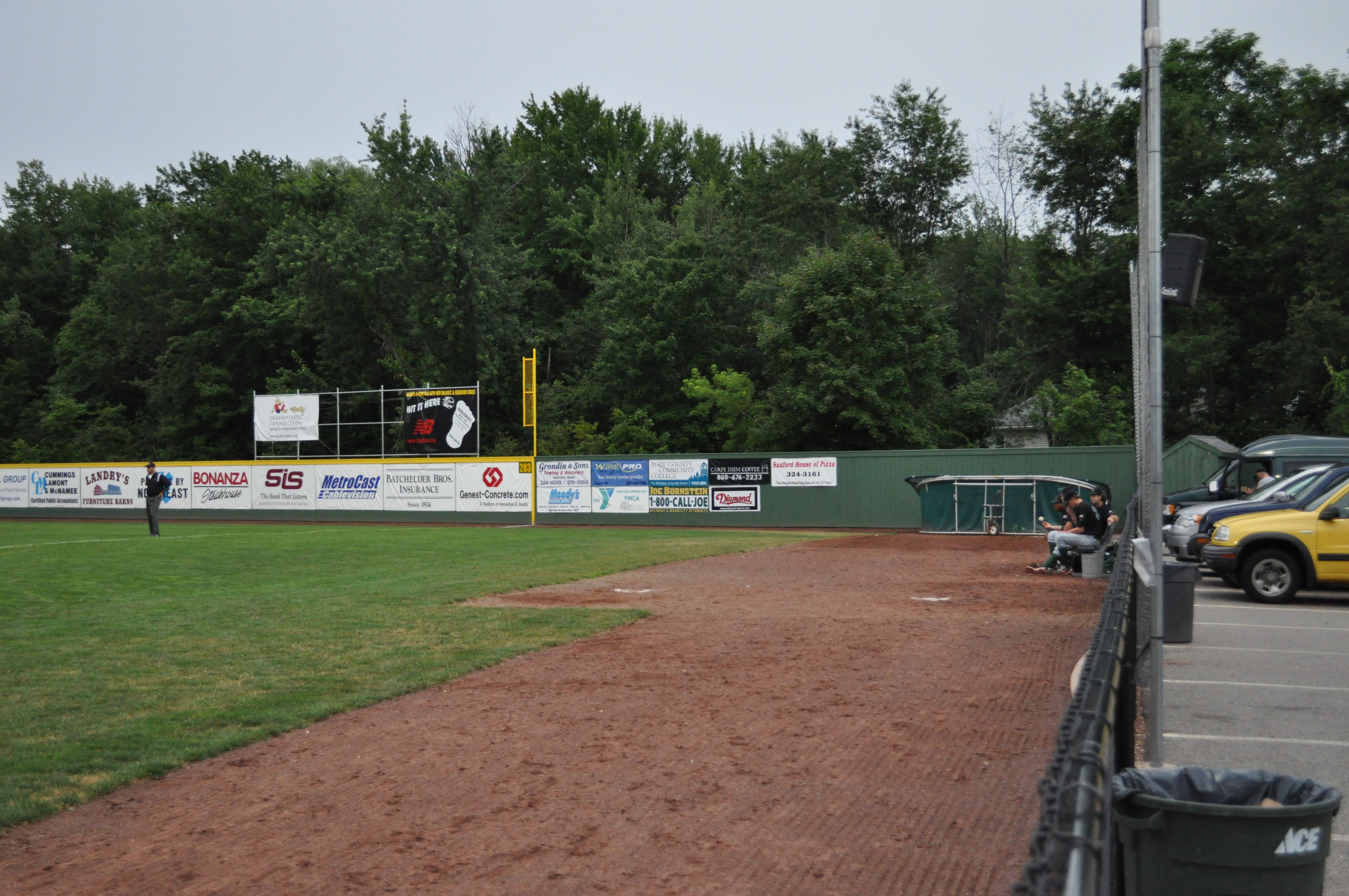
The visitors bullpen, located down the right field line.

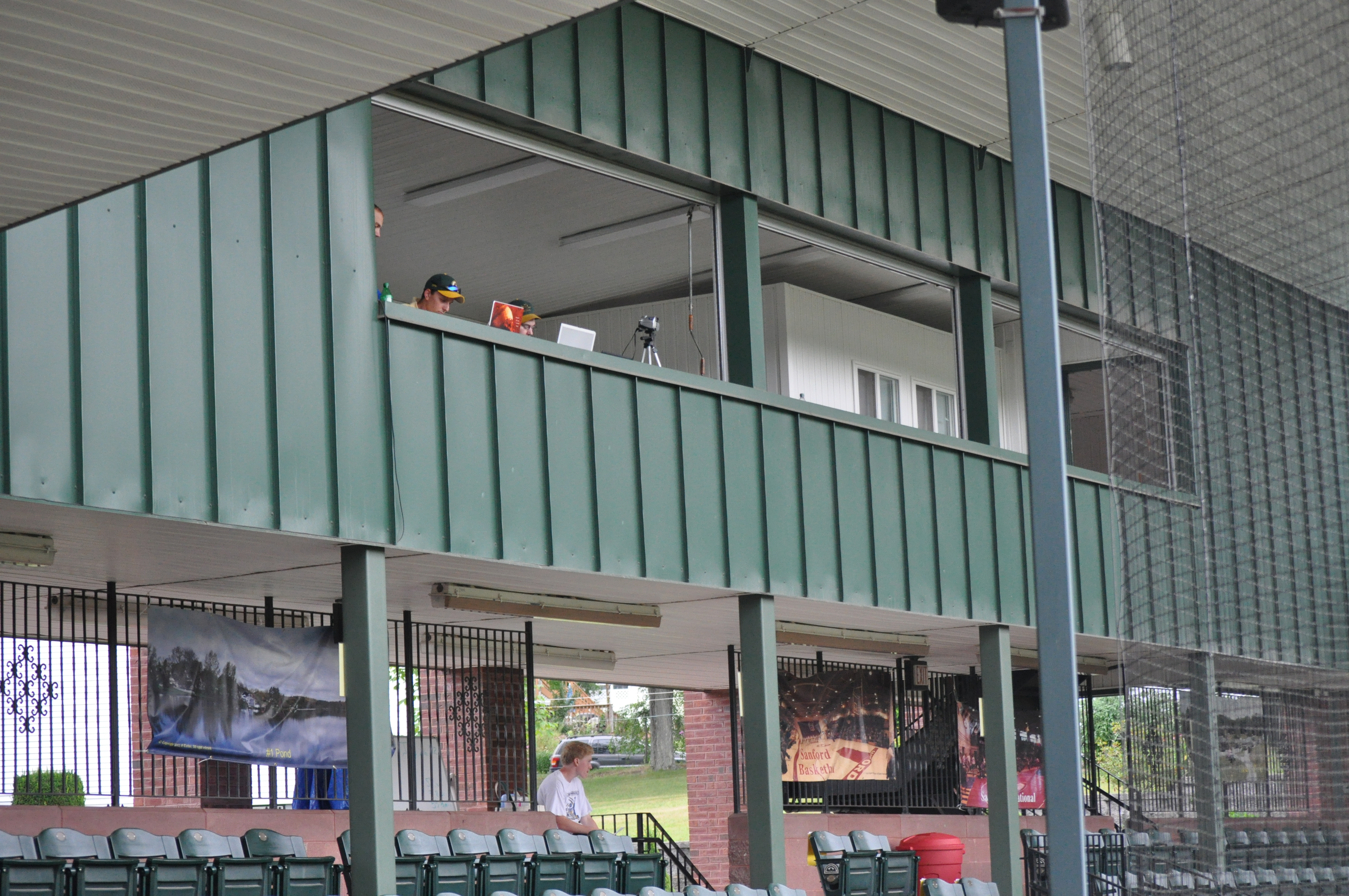
The press box, located above grandstand seating directly behind home plate.

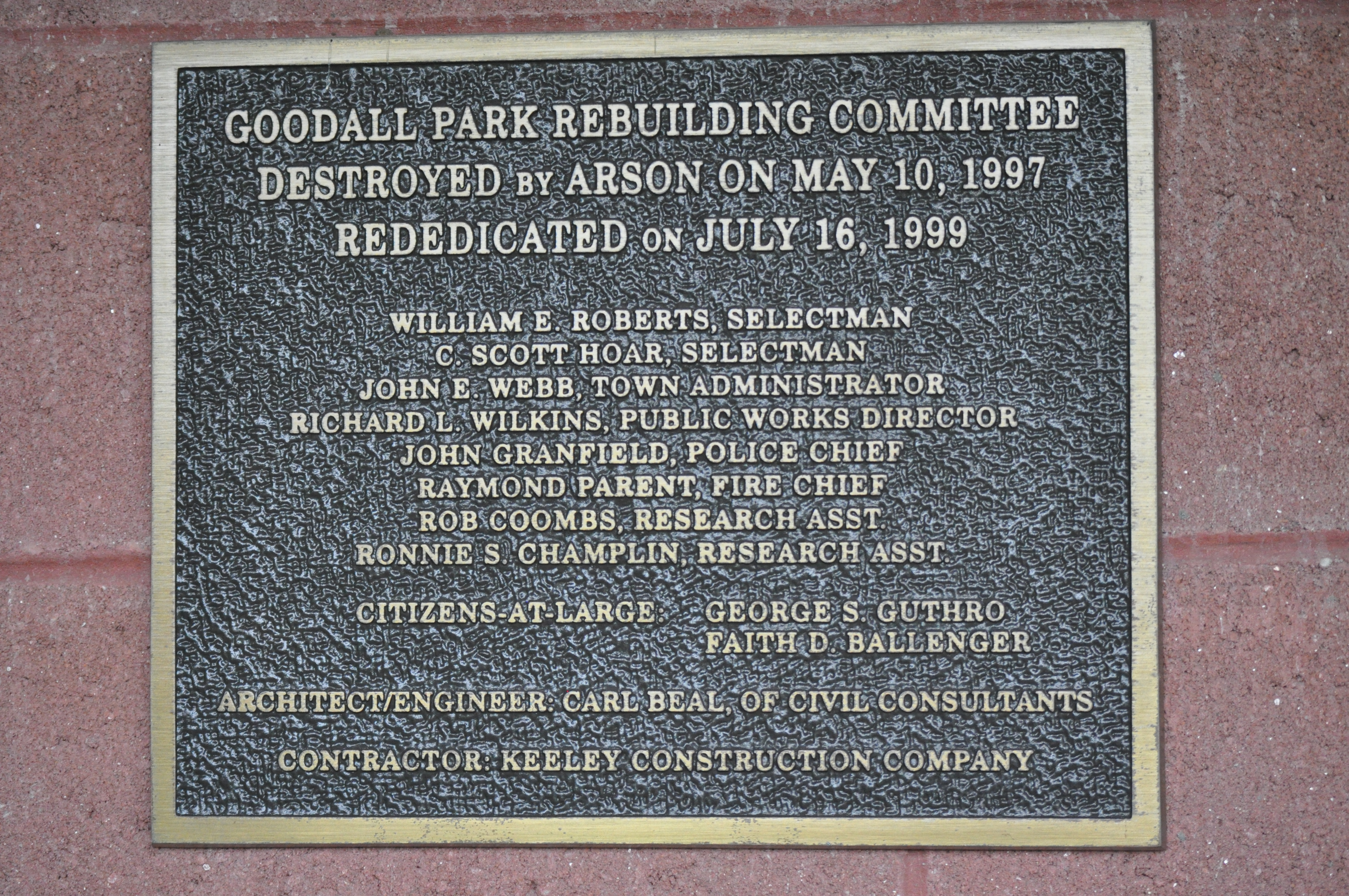
A plaque, located within the grandstand, that commemorates the park's rebuilding after it was destroyed by an arsonist.

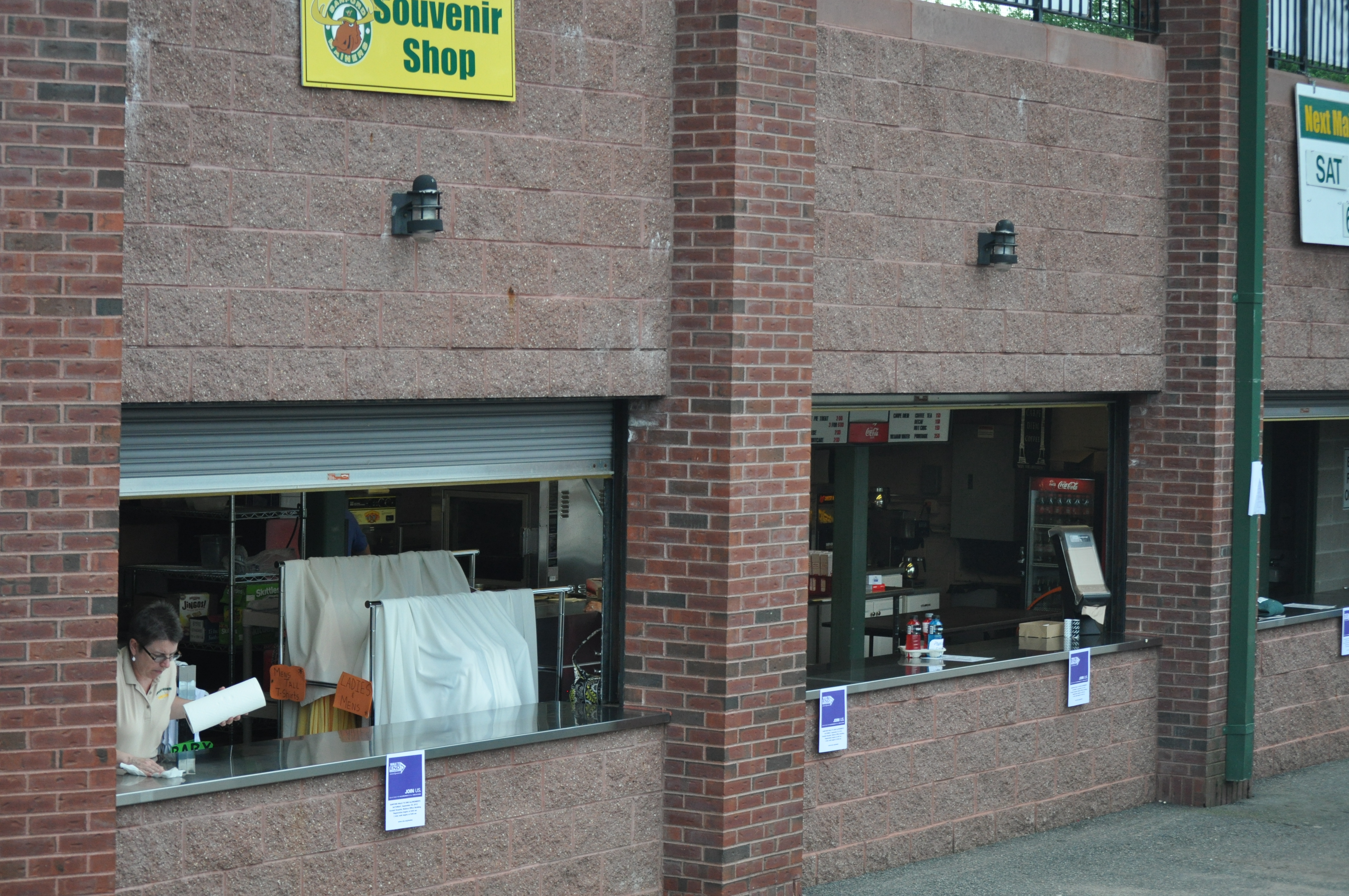
The park's main concession stand.
