= Middle Branch Mousam River =

Coordinates: 43.42953°N 70.68561°W

Location
- Country: United States

Physical characteristics
- Source
  - location: Maine

The Middle Branch Mousam River is a 13.9-mile-long (22.4 km) river in southern Maine, flowing through the town of Alfred in York County. It is a tributary of the Mousam River, which flows to the Atlantic Ocean.

== See also ==
- List of rivers of Maine
