= North Berwick (CDP), Maine =

North Berwick, Maine
- Census-designated place
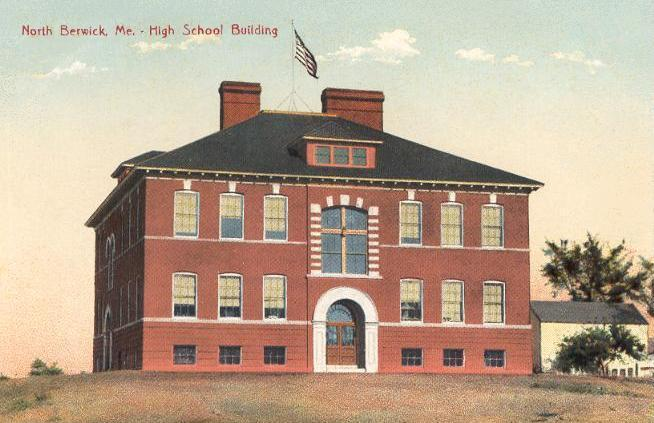
- Town Hall

- Location within the state of Maine
- Coordinates: 43°18′24″N 70°44′30″W
- Country: United States
- State: Maine
- County: York

Area
  - Total: 3.37 sq mi (8.74 km^{2})
  - Land: 3.37 sq mi (8.73 km^{2})
  - Water: 0 sq mi (0.00 km^{2})
- Elevation: 135 ft (41 m)

Population (2020)
  - Total: 1,721
  - Density: 510.3/sq mi (197.03/km^{2})
- Time zone: UTC-5 (Eastern (EST))
  - Summer (DST): UTC-4 (EDT)
- ZIP code: 03906
- Area code: 207
- FIPS code: 23-50290
- GNIS feature ID: 2377942

North Berwick is a census-designated place (CDP) consisting of the primary settlement in the town of North Berwick in York County, Maine, United States. The population was 1,615 at the 2010 census, out of a total town population of 4,576. It is part of the Portland–South Portland–Biddeford, Maine Metropolitan Statistical Area.

== Geography ==
According to the United States Census Bureau, the CDP has a total area of 3.2 square miles (8.3 km^{2}), all land. North Berwick is drained by the Great Works River and its tributary, the Neoutaquet River.

== Demographics ==
Historical population
Census	Pop.	Note	%±
2020	1,721		—
U.S. Decennial Census

As of the census of 2000, there were 1,580 people, 601 households, and 420 families residing in the CDP. The population density was 493.5 inhabitants per square mile (190.5/km^{2}). There were 626 housing units at an average density of 195.5 per square mile (75.5/km^{2}). The racial makeup of the CDP was 96.33% White, 1.08% Black or African American, 0.32% Native American, 0.70% Asian, 0.06% from other races, and 1.52% from two or more races. Hispanic or Latino of any race were 0.70% of the population.

There were 601 households, out of which 33.9% had children under the age of 18 living with them, 55.2% were married couples living together, 10.5% had a female householder with no husband present, and 30.1% were non-families. 23.5% of all households were made up of individuals, and 9.0% had someone living alone who was 65 years of age or older. The average household size was 2.55 and the average family size was 3.00.

In the CDP, the population was spread out, with 25.1% under the age of 18, 7.0% from 18 to 24, 31.6% from 25 to 44, 22.8% from 45 to 64, and 13.4% who were 65 years of age or older. The median age was 38 years. For every 100 females, there were 92.7 males. For every 100 females age 18 and over, there were 87.9 males.

The median income for a household in the CDP was $39,931, and the median income for a family was $46,964. Males had a median income of $34,000 versus $20,662 for females. The per capita income for the CDP was $17,992. About 4.5% of families and 5.4% of the population were below the poverty line, including 10.3% of those under age 18 and none of those age 65 or over.
