= Mousam River =

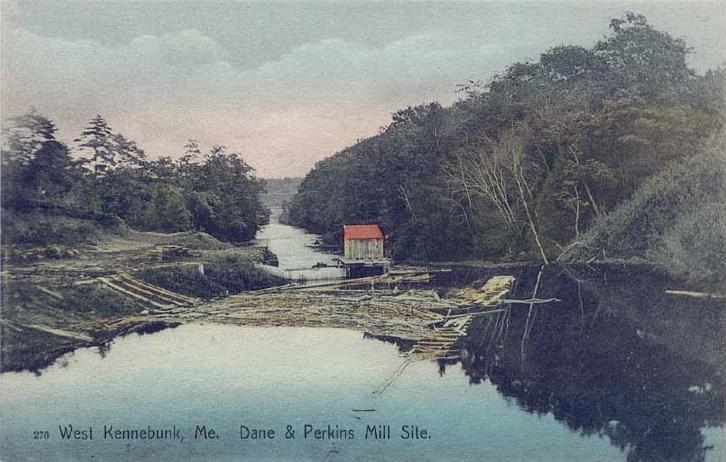
- View at West Kennebunk c. 1908

- Location of mouth

Location
- Country: United States

Physical characteristics
- Mouth
  - coordinates: 43°20′40″N 70°30′54″W

The Mousam River is a 29.7-mile-long (47.8 km) river in York County, Maine, United States. Its primary source is Mousam Lake, located between the towns of Shapleigh and Acton, and it flows into the Atlantic Ocean just west of Kennebunk Beach. It flows through the towns of Shapleigh, Sanford and Kennebunk.

== Major tributaries ==
- Littlefield River
- Middle Branch Mousam River
- Square Pond, outlet

== Dams ==
The Mousam River is one of the most heavily dammed rivers currently in the state of Maine, with a total of 13 (excluding major and minor tributaries). Most of the dams on the list below are used for hydroelectric production, while others are for impoundment and recreation, with former industrial uses. The list below is from river source to the mouth at the Atlantic Ocean:

- Emery Mills Dam or Mousam Dam, Shapleigh
- Mill Street Dam or Alpaca Dam, Springvale (completed 1910)
- Bridge Street Dam, Springvale
- Dam (name unknown), Springvale
- River Street Dam or Stump Pond Dam, Sanford
- Number 1 Pond Dam, Sanford (completed 1911)
- Dam (name unknown), Sanford
- Dam (name unknown), Sanford
- New dam or Estes Lake Dam, Sanford (completed 1905)
- Old Falls dam, Kennebunk
- Dane Perkins Dam, Kennebunk
- Twine Mill Dam, Kennebunk
- Kesslan Dam, Kennebunk
