= Springvale, Maine =

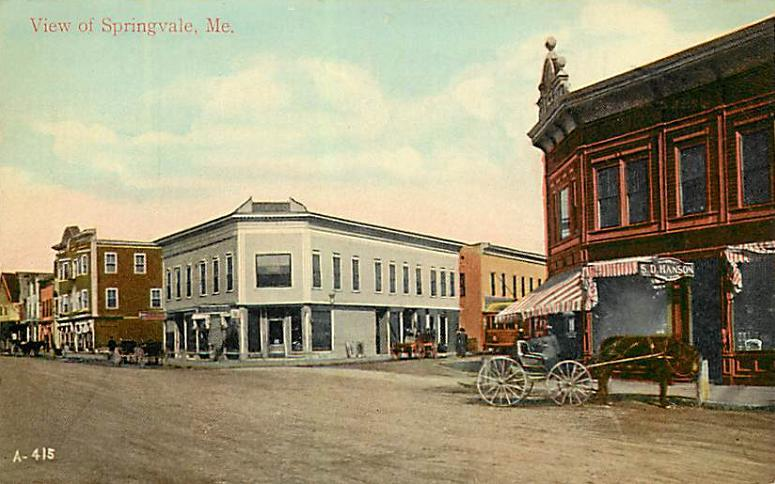
- View of Springvale in 1911

- Location within the state of Maine
- Coordinates: 43°27′51″N 70°47′44″W
- Country: United States
- State: Maine
- County: York

Area
  - Total: 3.2 sq mi (8.4 km^{2})
  - Land: 3.1 sq mi (8.1 km^{2})
  - Water: 0.12 sq mi (0.3 km^{2})
- Elevation: 360 ft (110 m)

Population (2010)
  - Total: 3,292
  - Density: 1,053/sq mi (406.4/km^{2})
- Time zone: UTC-5 (Eastern (EST))
  - Summer (DST): UTC-4 (EDT)
- ZIP code: 04083
- Area code: 207
- FIPS code: 23-73285
- GNIS feature ID: 0576123

Springvale is a village and former census-designated place in the city of Sanford in York County, Maine, United States. The population was 3,292 at the 2010 census. It is part of the Portland–South Portland–Biddeford, Maine metropolitan statistical area. The CDP was abolished when the town of Sanford reincorporated as a city.

== Geography ==
Springvale is located at 43°27′51″N 70°47′44″W (43.464053, -70.795608).

According to the United States Census Bureau, the CDP has a total area of 3.2 square miles (8.4 km^{2}), of which 3.1 square miles (8.1 km^{2}) is land and 0.12 square miles (0.3 km^{2}), or 3.69%, is water. Springvale is drained by the Mousam River.

=== Climate ===
This climatic region is typified by large seasonal temperature differences, with warm to hot (and often humid) summers and cold (sometimes severely cold) winters. According to the Köppen Climate Classification system, Springvale has a humid continental climate, abbreviated "Dfb" on climate maps.

== Demographics ==
As of the census of 2010, there were 3,292 people, 1,402 households, and 828 families residing in the CDP. The population density was 1,061.9 inhabitants per square mile (410.0/km^{2}). There were 1,552 housing units at an average density of 500.6 per square mile (193.3/km^{2}). The racial makeup of the CDP was 94.6% White, 0.4% African American, 0.2% Native American, 1.7% Asian, 0.4% some other race, and 2.6% from two or more races. Hispanic or Latino of any race were 1.9% of the population.

There were 1,402 households, out of which 28.4% had children under the age of 18 living with them, 40.0% were headed by married couples living together, 13.3% had a female householder with no husband present, and 40.9% were non-families. 32.5% of all households were made up of individuals, and 12.7% were someone living alone who was 65 years of age or older. The average household size was 2.33, and the average family size was 2.94.

In the CDP, the population was spread out, with 22.5% under the age of 18, 7.9% from 18 to 24, 26.9% from 25 to 44, 28.1% from 45 to 64, and 14.6% who were 65 years of age or older. The median age was 39.8 years. For every 100 females, there were 87.8 males. For every 100 females age 18 and over, there were 86.1 males.

For the period 2007–11, the estimated median annual income for a household in the CDP was $37,946, and the median income for a family was $49,554. Male full-time workers had a median income of $54,464 versus $27,273 for females. The per capita income for the CDP was $19,965. About 9.3% of families and 14.1% of the population were below the poverty line, including 21.0% of those under age 18 and 5.3% of those age 65 or over.

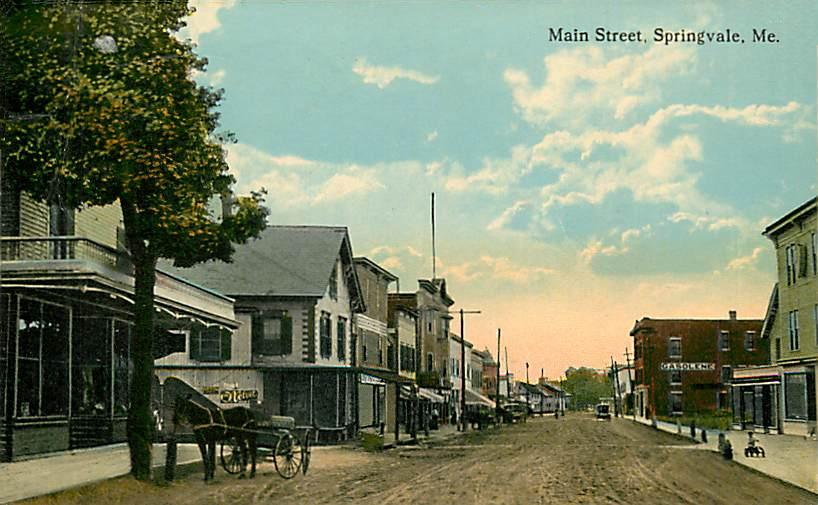
Main Street c. 1912

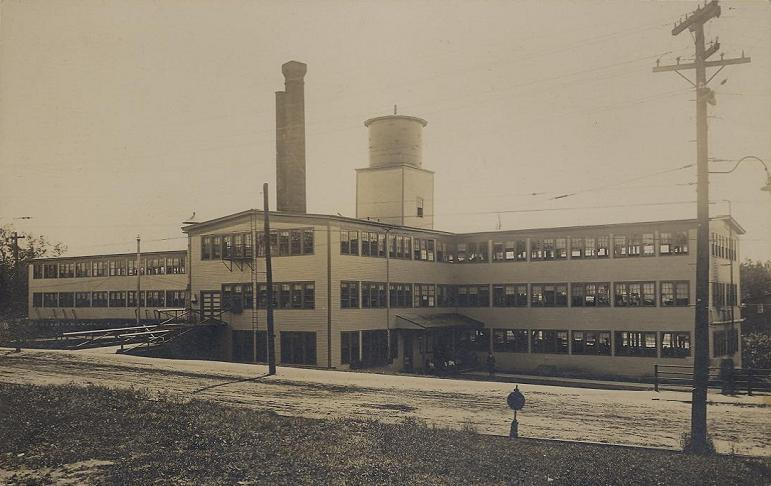
Shoe factory in 1910

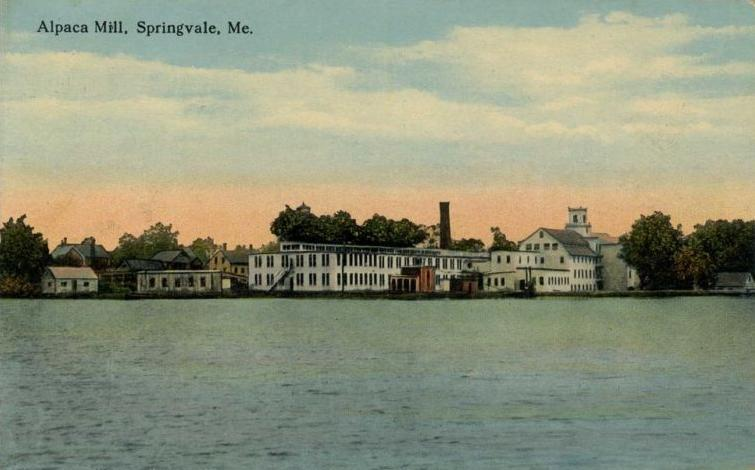
Alpaca Mill c. 1912

== Points of interest ==
- Harvey Butler Memorial Rhododendron Sanctuary
- Southern Maine Veterans Cemetery
- Springvale Public Library
