= Great Fires of 1947 =

Forest fires in Maine, US

The Great Fires of 1947 were a series of forest fires in the State of Maine in the United States that destroyed a total area of 200,000 acres (81,000 ha) statewide, 17,188 acres (6,956 ha) of that on Mount Desert Island. Collectively, the fires killed a total of 16 people. This disaster is an important part of the local history of York County and the Mount Desert Island area.

== The fires ==
After a wet spring, in which the months of April, May, and June were inundated with rainy weather, the climate turned to drought conditions in July 1947. By the end of September, the ground was extremely dry. State and local officials, recognizing the dangers of the dry conditions, began implementing preventive measures such as informing the public to have their chimneys cleaned. By the second week of October, the state was in a Class 4 state of danger, meaning a "high state of flammability." The State Forest Service reopened fire watch towers normally closed at the end of September.

Reports of small fires in the woods began coming into the Forest Service on October 7. These early fires burned in Portland, Bowdoin, and Wells. Being 30 miles (48 km) apart from each other, these three fires illustrated the danger. After this, reports of fires poured in, and by October 16, 20 separate fires were burning in the state. By October 19, many communities in Maine breathed air filled with a smoky haze and the smell of burning wood.

== York County ==
Hardest hit was northern York County, the southernmost county in the state. Fires began in the towns of Shapleigh and Waterboro, destroying both communities, including, with only a few exceptions, most homes. The fires swept through the forests and moved with the wind toward the ocean. In addition to Waterboro and Shapleigh, the towns of Alfred; Lyman; Newfield; Kennebunk; Kennebunkport; North Kennebunkport (now Arundel); Dayton; Wells; and the cities of Biddeford and Saco were devastated by fire. With the exception of Shapleigh and Waterboro, most town centers were saved through the tireless work of firefighters, most notably Goodwins Mills in the eastern corner of Lyman, where, due in part to a change in wind direction, only the center was saved, and all of the acreage around it burned to the ground.

== Mount Desert Island ==
On October 17, sparks at a cranberry bog near Town Hill, on Mount Desert Island, ignited a wildfire that intensified over the next ten days, aided by strong winds that began on October 21, and it was not declared out until mid-November. Nearly half the eastern side of Mount Desert Island burned, including 67 summer "cottages"—nearly one-third of the 222 cottages that stood at the time. Five historic grand hotels were also destroyed.

Over 10,000 acres (4,000 hectares) of Acadia National Park were destroyed. Bar Harbor's business district was spared, including Mount Desert Street, where several former summer homes within a historic district listed on the National Register of Historic Places now operate as inns.

== Restoration ==
After the fire, bulldozers were brought in to clear the debris and standing chimneys where homes once stood. It took a decade for many to fully recover their losses.

== Modern evidence of the Great Fires ==
Even today, evidence exists of the Great Fires that swept through York County. In Waterboro, Shapleigh, and Lyman, where the devastation was great, forests of small, undesirable pine trees grow en masse where great forests stood before the fires. One would notice on visits to these communities that homes within them lack historical significance; the oldest were built in the late 1940s. Most historic farms and homes built before 1947 in these communities were destroyed.

In the late 1980s, to commemorate the Great Fires of 1947, the State of Maine developed signs for each community where the fires burned, detailing the effect the fires had on those communities. Signs still stand today in many communities, including Alfred at the Alfred Fire Department on Kennebunk Road, Shapleigh at the Ross Corner Fire Department on Ross Corner Road, and North Kennebunkport (Arundel) at the Central Fire Station and Town Hall on Limerick Road.

Many people fought to save their homes. In a book published in 1979, Joyce Butler wrote about the Great Fires of 1947 in Wildfire Loose: The Week Maine Burned:

Juanita and Franklin Spofford lived on the Granite Point Road across Horseshoe Cove from Fortunes Rocks. The Spoffords wet down their house with a garden hose until the pressure failed. Then they filled buckets and tubs and set them around the house. As burning debris carried by the wind fell in the grass, setting it afire, they wet brooms in the buckets and beat the flames out. Bushes beside the garage caught fire. The house across the street and others on Granite Point Road burned, but the Spoffords' did as well.

== See also ==
- List of disasters in Maine by death toll

== Bibliography ==
- Joyce Butler, Wildfire Loose: The Week Maine Burned (Downeast Books, 1979) ISBN 0-89272-242-8
