= Leatrice =

Leatrice is a given name. Notable people with the name include:

- Leatrice Eiseman, an American color specialist.
- Leatrice Joy (1893–1985), an American actress.
- Leatrice Morin (1922–2009), an American politician.

== See also ==
- Beatrice (disambiguation)
