= Skelton Dam =

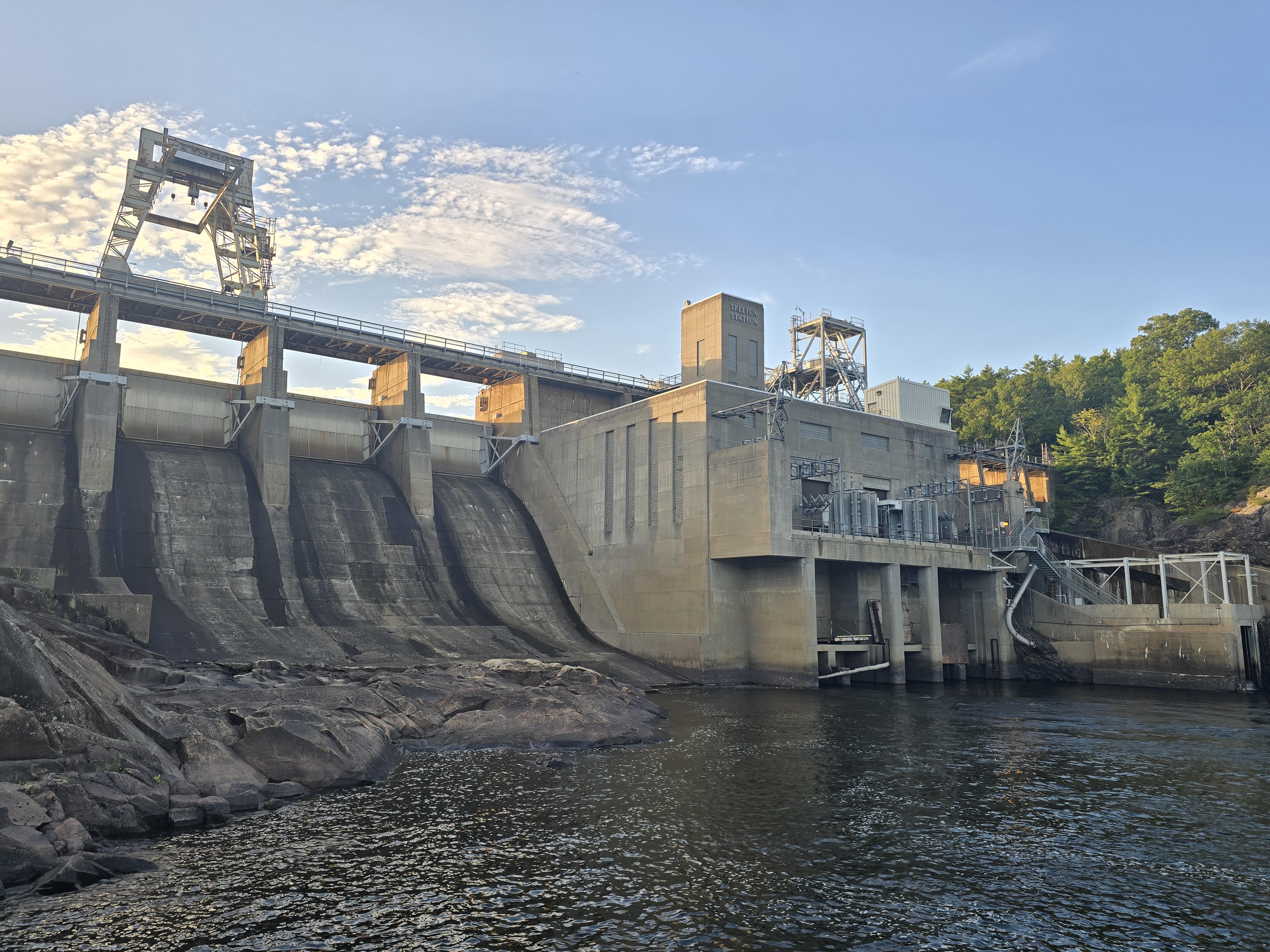
- Skelton Dam in 2026

- Location within Maine
- Country: United States
- Location: Buxton / Dayton, Maine
- Coordinates: 43°34′10″N 070°33′32″W
- Purpose: Power, flood control
- Status: Operational
- Opening date: 1948
- Owner: Brookfield Renewable

Dam and spillways
- Impounds: Saco River
- Height: 76 ft (23 m)
- Length: 1,695 ft (517 m)
- Spillway type: Gate-controlled
- Spillway capacity: 69,600 cu ft/s (1,971 m^{3}/s)

Reservoir
- Total capacity: 33,500 acre⋅ft (41,321,642 m^{3})
- Catchment area: 1,622 mi^{2} (4,201 km^{2})
- Surface area: 488 acres (2 km^{2})

Power Station
- Hydraulic head: 76 ft (23 m)
- Installed capacity: 16.8 MW

The Skelton Dam is an embankment dam on the Saco River between the towns of Buxton and Dayton in York County, Maine. It is located about 7 mi (11 km) northwest of Saco and Biddeford. The dam was completed in 1948 with the primary purpose of hydroelectric power generation. The largest fish lift in Maine was completed on the dam in 2001. The dam and facilities are owned by Brookfield Renewable.
