= Buxton Powder House =

- U.S. National Register of Historic Places
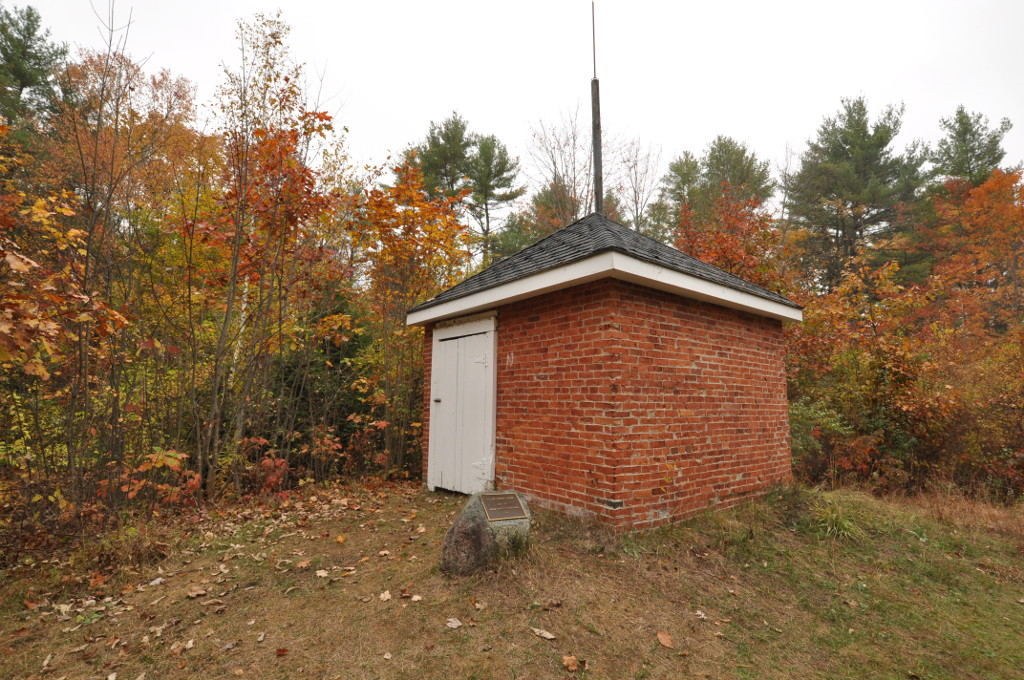

- Location within Maine Location within the United States
- Location: ME 22, Buxton Center, Maine
- Coordinates: 43°38′54″N 70°32′47″W
- Area: 0.5 acres (0.20 ha)
- Built: 1812
- Built by: Elwell, Theodore
- NRHP reference No.: 76000120
- Added to NRHP: January 2, 1976

The Buxton Powder House is a historic military storage magazine in Buxton, Maine. Built in 1813, this small brick building housed the community's military supplies during the War of 1812, and is one of three such structures to survive in the state. It is located in a field off Long Plains Road near the center of the town. It was listed on the National Register of Historic Places in 1976.

== Description and history ==
The Buxton Powder Magazine is a small brick building, about 10 by 10 feet (3.0 m × 3.0 m) in size, with a pyramidal roof and a granite foundation. It stands in a wooded area, about 250 metres (820 ft) west of Long Plains Road (Maine State Route 22). Its walls are about 1 foot (0.30 m) thick. A heavy wooden door is attached via two wrought iron hinges. The walls of the interior are lined with wooden shelves.

After the War of 1812 broke out in March 1812, the town voted to construct a magazine for the storage of its military supplies, which had been held in a private residence. This building was completed in 1813 by Theodore Elwell for $59, and was used to house the town supply of gunpowder, lead ball, flints, and other supplies. It is only one of three such town-built structures in the state; the others are in Hallowell and Wiscasset.

== See also ==
- National Register of Historic Places listings in York County, Maine
