= Proprietors Meeting House and Parish House =

Historic church in Maine, United States

- U.S. National Register of Historic Places
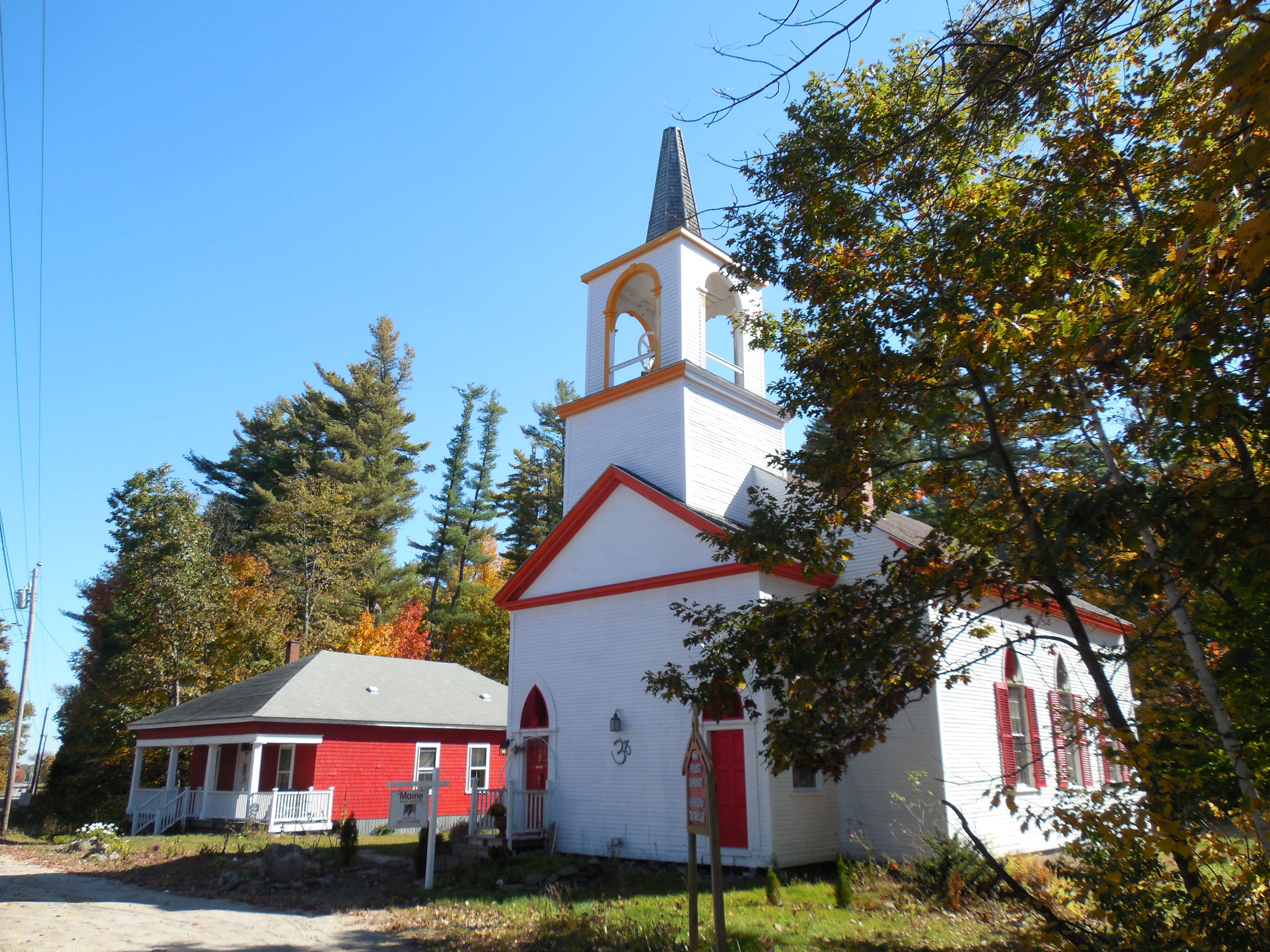
- Proprietors Meeting House and Parish House

- Location within Maine Location within the United States
- Location: Jct. of ME 22 and Old County Rd., Scarborough, Maine (in South Buxton village)
- Coordinates: 43°37′14″N 70°28′45″W
- Area: less than one acre
- Built: 1839
- Architectural style: Federal, Gothic Revival, et al.
- NRHP reference No.: 01000813
- Added to NRHP: August 2, 2001

The Proprietors Meeting House and Parish House, known for many years as the Universalist Church of Scarborough and South Buxton, is a historic church complex at the junction of Maine State Route 22 and Old County Road in the village of South Buxton, on the Scarborough side of the town line with Buxton, Maine. The church, built about 1839, is a fine local example of transitional Federal-Gothic Revival architecture, and the adjacent parish house, built in 1914, is a good local example of the Bungalow style. The property, purchased for use of the Maine Hindu Temple in 2012, was listed on the National Register of Historic Places in 2001. The Hindu Temple has since moved out and the property is now vacant.

== Description and history ==
The Proprietors Meeting House and Parish House is located at the southeast corner of Broad Turn Road and Old County Road (Maine State Route 22) in southeastern Buxton. The meeting house is a single-story rectangular structure with a projecting entry pavilion, and a tower straddling the line between the two sections. The main roof and entry section roof are gabled, and the walls are clapboarded. The entry pavilion has two entrances, set near its corners, with flanking pilasters and Gothic-arched louvered fans above. Windows at the sides are sash, with similar Gothic fans. The tower has a square first stage, with an open belfry that has arched openings, and a steeple above.

The parish house stands just east of the meetinghouse. It is a single-story wood-frame structure, topped by a hip roof and finished in wooden shingles. The roof covers an engaged porch at the front, supported by square posts linked by a slatted balustrade. The interior of the original portion of the building consists of a hall with a stage at the far end, with a kitchen and modern bathroom facilities in additions near the rear.

The congregation that built the church was organized in 1838, primarily to provide Sunday School services to the area population. The church was built in 1839 or 1840 (extant records disagree), and was sporadically served by ministers through the 19th century, although the Sunday School was generally well-attended. The congregation was formally organized as the Universalist Church of Scarborough and South Buxton in 1891, and the parish hall was built in 1914. In about 2000, the building was turned over to the Friends of the Proprietors Meeting House, and was taken over by the Anchor Missionary Fellowship in 2002. In 2012 it was purchased by a private citizen— Tejinder Jit, owner of Tandoor Indian Restaurant in Portland— for use by the Maine Hindu Temple, but the temple acquired a different church in Westbrook.

== See also ==
- National Register of Historic Places listings in Cumberland County, Maine
