= Donald Russell (American football) =

American football player and coach

Donald M. Russell
Coaching career (HC unless noted)
- 1960–1963: Wesleyan (assistant)
- 1964–1970: Wesleyan

Head coaching record
- Overall: 37–19 (college)

Accomplishments and honors

Championships
- 3 Little Three (1966, 1969–1970)

Donald M. Russell is an American former football coach He served as the head football coach at Wesleyan University from 1964 to 1970, compiled a record of 37–19. He has the highest winning percentage (.661) of any head coach in the history of Wesleyan Cardinals football program with a tenure longer than two seasons.

== Early years ==
A native of Quincy, Massachusetts, Russell graduated from Bates College in Lewiston, Maine in 1951. He played offensive and defensive tackle for the Bates College football team. After graduating from Bates, Russell spent nine years as a high school teacher and football coach at Hollis High School in Hollis, Maine, Thornton Academy in Saco, Maine, and Turner Falls High School in Turners Falls, Massachusetts.

== Wesleyan football coach ==
In 1960, Russell joined the coaching staff at Wesleyan University as an assistant football coach under Norm Daniels. After Daniels took a sabbatical, Russell took over as the head football coach in June 1964. He also became Wesleyan's athletic director and chairman of the physical education department in 1968. His best season at Wesleyan was in 1969 when he led the Wesleyan Cardinals football team to an undefeated, untied 8–0 record and a Little Three championship. The 1969 Cardinals also shared the Lambert Cup with Delaware as the best small college team in the East, and Russell was selected as the 1969 New England small college coach of the year. He also led Wesleyan to Little Three football championships in 1966 and 1970. In seven years as the head football coach at Wesleyan, Russell compiled a record of 37–19. His winning percentage of .661 is the highest among all Wesleyan football coaches with more than two years on the job and is the highest among all football coaches since 1920. In November 1970, Russell announced his intention to retire from active coaching at the end of the year in order to allow him to devote full time to his job as chairman of the university's physical education department.

== Head coaching record ==
=== College ===
Year	Team	Overall	Conference	Standing	Bowl/playoffs
Wesleyan Cardinals (Little Three) (1964–1970)
1964	Wesleyan	4–4	0–2	3rd	
1965	Wesleyan	5–3	0–2	3rd	
1966	Wesleyan	6–2	2–0	1st	
1967	Wesleyan	4–4	0–2	3rd	
1968	Wesleyan	5–3	1–1	2nd	
1969	Wesleyan	8–0	2–0	1st	
1970	Wesleyan	5–3	2–0	1st	
Wesleyan:		37–19	7–7		
Total:		37–19			
National championship Conference title Conference division title or championship game berth
