= Robert Daigle (Maine politician) =

American politician

Robert A. Daigle (born April 3, 1953) is an American politician from Maine. A Republican, Daigle represented Arundel, Maine in the Maine House of Representatives from 1999 to 2006. Prior to running for office, he served as Chair of Maine's Pollution Prevention Advisory Committee from 1990 to 1996. Born in Portland, Maine, he earned a B.S. from the University of Maine in 1975. He is married and has one child.
