= Thornton Academy =

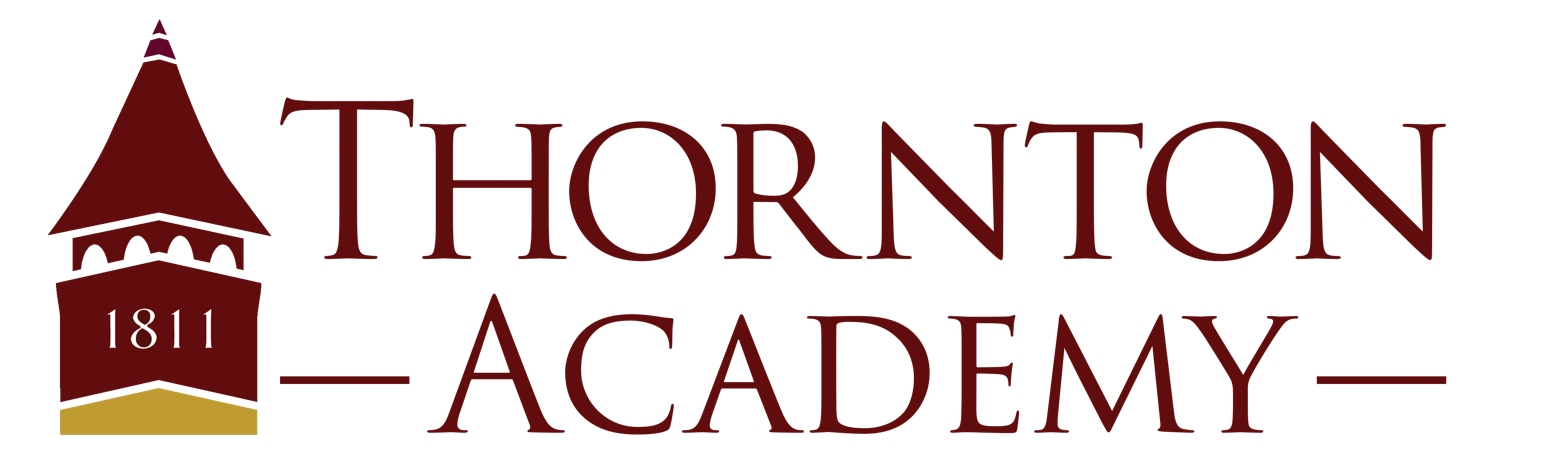

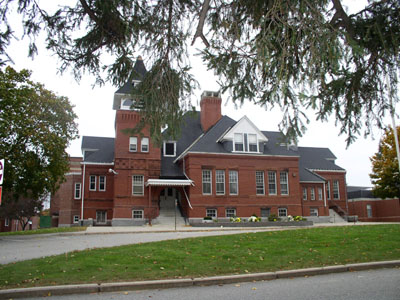
- Thornton's Main Building

Location
- 438 Main Street; Saco, York, Maine 04072; United States; 43°30′20″N 70°26′25″W

Information
- Established: 1811
- Headmaster: Rene Menard
- Enrollment: 1,400
- Colors: Maroon and gold
- Athletics conference: SMAA
- Mascot: Golden Trojans
- Rival: Biddeford Tigers
- Newspaper: Carpe Diem
- TV Station: Thornton Academy TV (TATV) Channel 3 Saco - News 3 (Newscasts) (Spectrum)
- Website: www.thorntonacademy.org

Thornton Academy (often abbreviated as TA) is a co-educational, independent public-private boarding and day school serving grades 9–12 located in Saco, Maine. Thornton Academy also opened a full-time, private junior high school on its campus, named Thornton Academy Middle School, which serves grades 6-8 for Saco, Dayton and Arundel students.

== History ==
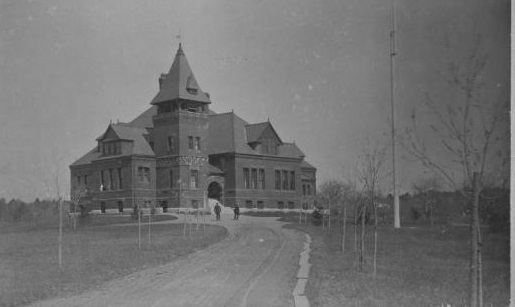
Original Thornton Academy building c. 1900

Thornton Academy was first established in 1811, under the name "Saco Academy" in response to a petition by citizens of southern Maine, most of them from Saco, to the Massachusetts legislature, which passed, in both houses, a bill founding the school in February 1811. The founding legislation also granted, as was common, one half a township or 18 sq mi (12,000 acres; 47 km^{2}) in northern Maine (most of what is currently the southern part of Greenville) as an endowment so long as the trustees named in the founding charter raised US$3,000 in funds. After successful fundraising and construction, Saco Academy officially opened on January 4, 1813.

The school was plagued for years by financial difficulty. The name was officially changed to Thornton Academy in 1821 in gratitude for the gift of $1,000 by Dr. Thomas G. Thornton, also the marshal for the Maine territory, which put the school on solid financial footing. Depending upon the economic indices used, the gift was worth about US$20,300 in 2018 dollars.

The academy was destroyed by fire on July 28, 1848, in what was concluded to be arson, although no culprit was ever found. Almost all records were lost in the fire, and the academy was closed indefinitely. Although the board of trustees continued to meet and discuss the school's future, serious efforts to rebuild the school were not taken until 1884, when investments by trustee James W. Bradbury had more than quintupled the academy's financial endowment.

In 1886 8 acres (3.2 ha) of land were purchased by the board at the corner of Main Street and Fairfield Street in Saco as the future site of Thornton Academy. On July 27, 1886, Thornton Academy became a legal corporation. The plans for the new school building were designed by H. G. Wadlin. It officially re-opened on September 6, 1889 and began its school year three days later with a class of 108 students. Today the original building is referred to as the Main Building.

Over the course of the next fifty years, several buildings were added to the grounds: the Charles Cutts Gookin Thornton Building in 1903, the headmaster's home in 1905, the George Addison Emery Gymnasium in 1913, and the Main Building Annex in 1931. Starting in the late 1950s and continuing to the early '70s, additional buildings were added because of enrollment increases related to the post-WWII baby boom: the John S. Locke Building, the William Linnell Gymnasium, the Edith Scamman Science Building, and an Industrial Arts Building. In 1996, 54,000 square feet were added, linking the Main Building with the Scamman Science Building, and adding the Mary Hyde Library, the Helen Atkinson Dining Commons, the Harry Garland Auditorium, six arts classrooms and six math classrooms. Because the academy has grown to nearly 80 acres (32 ha) and the buildings listed, it more resembles a university campus than a traditional American high school.

=== Opening of new programs ===
In fall 2006, Thornton Academy Middle School was opened on campus in the completely renovated footprint of the Fine Arts Building. The middle school houses grades 6–8. Free to children from Dayton, as well as Arundel because of a contract with that community, children from surrounding areas can pay a tuition to go to the middle school.

In the fall of 2009, Thornton Academy welcomed dozens of students from around the world in a brand new international boarding program. The school built a dormitory on campus which housed more than 40 students and several dorm families. The new dorm was named James E. Nelson Hall. In the summer of 2011, Thornton Academy built and opened a second dormitory, which is called Carl and Barbara Stasio Residence Hall, after the previous headmaster and his wife. Nearly 100 students will live in the dorms, split by gender. In the fall of 2017, a third large dormitory opened on campus, called Trojan Hall. 52 male students live in the dorm, bringing the overall total of residential students at Thornton Academy to more than 200. There is also a homestay program at Thornton Academy which enlists community host families to take in students for the school year. More than 20 countries are represented in the program each year.

== Governance ==
The academy is privately owned and governed by a board of trustees. Since 1889 the trustees have, like several other of the oldest academies in New England, contracted with local communities to serve their needs for education, as well as accepting students who do not live in these communities and whose parents pay tuition. Currently the trustees have contracts with the communities of Saco and Dayton to educate all their students in grades 9–12 and with the community of Arundel for educating grades 6–8. Arundel currently allows high school choice for grades 9–12 students and many of these students also attend Thornton Academy. The current headmaster of grades 6–12 is 1988 Thornton Academy Alumnus, Rene Menard. He is only the eighth headmaster since 1889, when the academy moved to its current location. He succeeded Carl J. Stasio Jr. following the 2011–2012 school year.

== School structure ==
=== High school ===
Thornton Academy has a student population of 1,420, making it the largest public-private high school in the State of Maine. The total student number is larger than the three Portland Public High Schools, with each having fewer than 1,000 students. Statistics do not combine Portland High Schools, although the Portland Public School Department has the largest student population overall in Maine, beating out the Saco School Department.

The school's scheduling system for grades 9–12 is one called block scheduling and is used throughout most of southern Maine's high schools. Rather than students taking all of their classes in a single day, classes are divided along a two-day cycle with four class 'blocks' in each day. This causes each class to meet for 80 minutes every two school days instead of 40 minutes every school day. The intent of this system is to allow teachers and students to be more thorough in each class meeting, with a smaller amount of time devoted every day to the transition between classes. The two alternating days are named "Maroon Days" and "Gold Days" after the school's official colors.

The students who attend Thornton Academy are from the City of Saco and the Town of Dayton, with both municipalities utilizing the school as its primary high school (upon an agreement with the academy for over a century). Students from the Town of Arundel have had the option to attend Thornton Academy, starting with Thornton Academy Middle School when it was built, free of charge with tuition being covered by the Town of Arundel. Other students who attend T.A. are "day students", which originally reside in neighboring cities and towns such as Scarborough, Old Orchard Beach, South Portland, Portland, Westbrook, Cape Elizabeth, Biddeford, Kennebunk and Kennebunkport, Wells, Buxton, etc. T.A. in recent years has also expanded their Dorm Program to add students from various other U.S. states and foreign countries.

=== Middle school ===
Thornton Academy Middle School caters to students grades 6 to 8. It consists of three sixth grade base teachers, who teach all core subjects. There is also a UA staff that teaches art, music, guidance, and health/wellness. The seventh and eighth graders start off by meeting with an advisory in one of the classrooms. The advisories are mixtures of both grades. The principal is Tiffany Robert.

== Extracurricular activities ==
=== High school sports ===
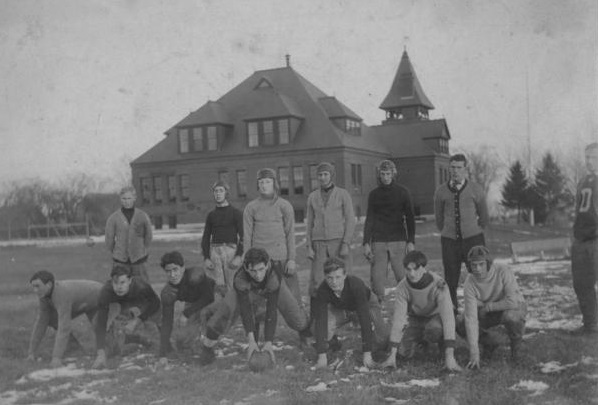
Thornton Academy Football Team, ca. 1908

Thornton Academy offers a wide variety of sports in grades 9–12, with teams for both boys and girls in almost every sport fielded at the varsity, junior varsity and freshmen levels. Fall sports include football, field hockey, soccer, cross country, volleyball, cheer leading and golf. Winter sports include basketball, cheerleading, indoor track, ice hockey and swimming. Spring sports include outdoor track, lacrosse, softball, baseball, and tennis. With many of these sports founded at the school between 1889 and 1930, Thornton has an illustrious history holding state championships.

On March 12, 2011, the Thornton Academy boys varsity hockey won the 2010-2011 Maine State Class A Hockey Championship by defeating Lewiston, 4–3, in double overtime. A tip in goal by C.J. Maksut sent the Trojans to its first ever state title in boys hockey.

On November 17, 2012, the Thornton Academy football team beat Lawrence at Fitzpatrick Stadium to become the 2012 Maine State Class A Champions.

On November 22, 2014, the Thornton Academy football team beat Windham at Fitzpatrick Stadium to become the 2014 Maine State Class A Champions.

=== Other activities ===
Sports offered by the middle school are boys and girls soccer, cross country, indoor track, outdoor track, basketball, skiing, snowboarding, baseball, and softball. The middle school offers two yearly plays; a musical and a drama. The school has two choruses and two bands. Other clubs offered are NJHS, Civil Rights, Drama Club, Ski Club, Student Council, and iTeam.

== Notable alumni ==
- Carlos Baker, writer, biographer
- Justin Chenette, state legislator
- Leatrice Morin, state legislator (class of 1940)
- Nancy Sullivan, state legislator
- Benjamin Ide Wheeler, former president of the University of California

== Notable faculty ==
- Thomas Eck, American football coach
- Donald Russell, American football coach

== See also ==
- Education in Maine
