= Dyer Library =

Public library in Saco, Maine, US

Coordinates: 43.501°N 70.4416°W

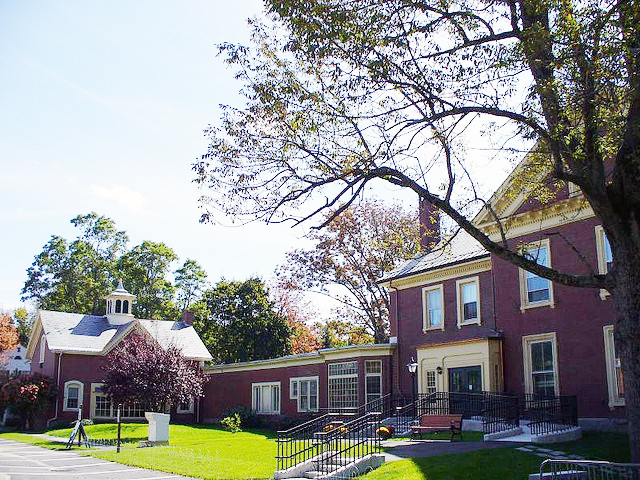
- Location: Saco, Maine, United States, United States
- Type: Public
- Established: 1881

Collection
- Size: 53,000

Access and use
- Circulation: 168,000
- Population served: 18,482

Other information
- Budget: $440,016
- Director: Sophie Smith
- Employees: 15
- Website: www.dyerlibrarysacomuseum.org

Dyer Library is a public library in Saco, Maine, United States. Funded by a bequest from Olive Dyer, the first home of the Dyer Library opened in 1881 in the basement of Saco City Hall. The library is located in the J.G. Deering House.

== History ==
=== 1880-1900 ===
The library was funded by a bequest from Olive Dyer in the name of her husband Oliver. The first home of the Dyer Library was created in the basement of Saco City Hall. A dirt floor was covered over in hard pine, and a furnace was added with many other additional pieces of furniture. Sarah W. Tucker was hired as the first librarian at a salary of $400 a year. The library was officially opened in spring, 1881.

In 1893, the building shortly north of City Hall was constructed as the second home of the library. The interior was largely one open space, divided visually by a broad wooden double arch, originally described by Horace G. Wadlin. The front of the reading room contained an oak common table and a large open fireplace. The rear space housed shelf stacks. Funds for construction of the building were provided by Mrs. John C. Bradbury and George E. Means. Some time later, philanthropist Cornelius Sweetser left the Dyer Library $10,000 as a maintenance fund.

=== 1955-1980 ===
A half-century later in the former building, the Dyer Library moved north in 1955 to the former home of board president Frank Cutter Deering, next to the York Institute.

In 1974, a new wing was added adjacent to Deering's huge flat-roofed parlor. It connected to the carriage house which providing new offices, and the Deering Room, Board Room, and what is now the Reed's Children's Room, was created with a bequest from Lillian Reed.

In 1976, the Dyer Library and York Institute joined as the Dyer Library Association. The York Institute was later renamed as the Saco Museum. Within more recent years and due to their partnership of the two communities, the Dyer Library Association is now referred to as Dyer Library/Saco Museum.

=== 1995-present ===
The museum and library receive about 60 percent of funding from the City of Saco.

In the Children's Room of the Dyer Library, the employees and director have been allowing children to make their own crafts for the library for many years. As of recently, the Dyer Library allows children to decorate a tree for the Festival of Trees at the Saco Museum yearly.

In September 2018, the Dyer Library was robbed and burglarized. Miscellaneous amounts of cash went missing and doors were tampered with and damaged.

During the start of the COVID-19 pandemic in March 2020, the Dyer Library was closed until the beginning of June. A mask mandate was in place until June 2021. The mask mandate was put back into effect in August due to rising cases in Maine, but was removed in the early spring of 2022.

On 14 November 2024, the Dyer Library hosted a book signing for author and radio personality Jon Shannon, promoting his book "The Longest Summer."
