= Ferry Beach State Park =

State park in York County, Maine

- Location within Maine
- Interactive map of Ferry Beach State Park
- Location: Saco, Maine, United States
- Coordinates: 43°28′53″N 70°23′35″W
- Area: 117 acres (47 ha)
- Elevation: 0 ft (0 m)
- Administrator: Maine Department of Agriculture, Conservation and Forestry
- Website: Official website
- Maine State Parks

Ferry Beach State Park is a public recreation area occupying 117 acres (47 ha) on Saco Bay north of the mouth of the Saco River in Saco, Maine. The state park encompasses a sandy Atlantic Ocean beach, inland hiking trails, and nature center. The inland portion of the park is noted for its pocket swamp and tupelo trees found at the northern limit of the species's range. The park is managed by the Maine Department of Agriculture, Conservation and Forestry.
