= Gibeon Bradbury =

American painter (1833–1904)

Gibeon Elden Bradbury (1833–1904) was a painter from Buxton, Maine. Bradbury was born in a particular section of Buxton entitled Salmon Falls, an area on a large hill near the Saco River. The son of Nathaniel Scamman Bradbury and Lucy Sawyer Bradbury, Gibeon spent most of his life in Salmon Falls.

Bradbury began a successful business in Portland, where he ornamented many types of vehicles. As his business became more successful, he began what he is now most famous for: painting.

There is also a rumor that Bradbury was known by Herman Melville, as in Melville's book Moby-Dick Melville makes a reference to "the painter of the saco" meaning the one who painted the Saco River, which is what Gibeon painted most often.

http://www.sacomuseum.org/library/GibeonBradbury.html
