= Samuel Chase House =

Historic house in Massachusetts, United States

- U.S. National Register of Historic Places
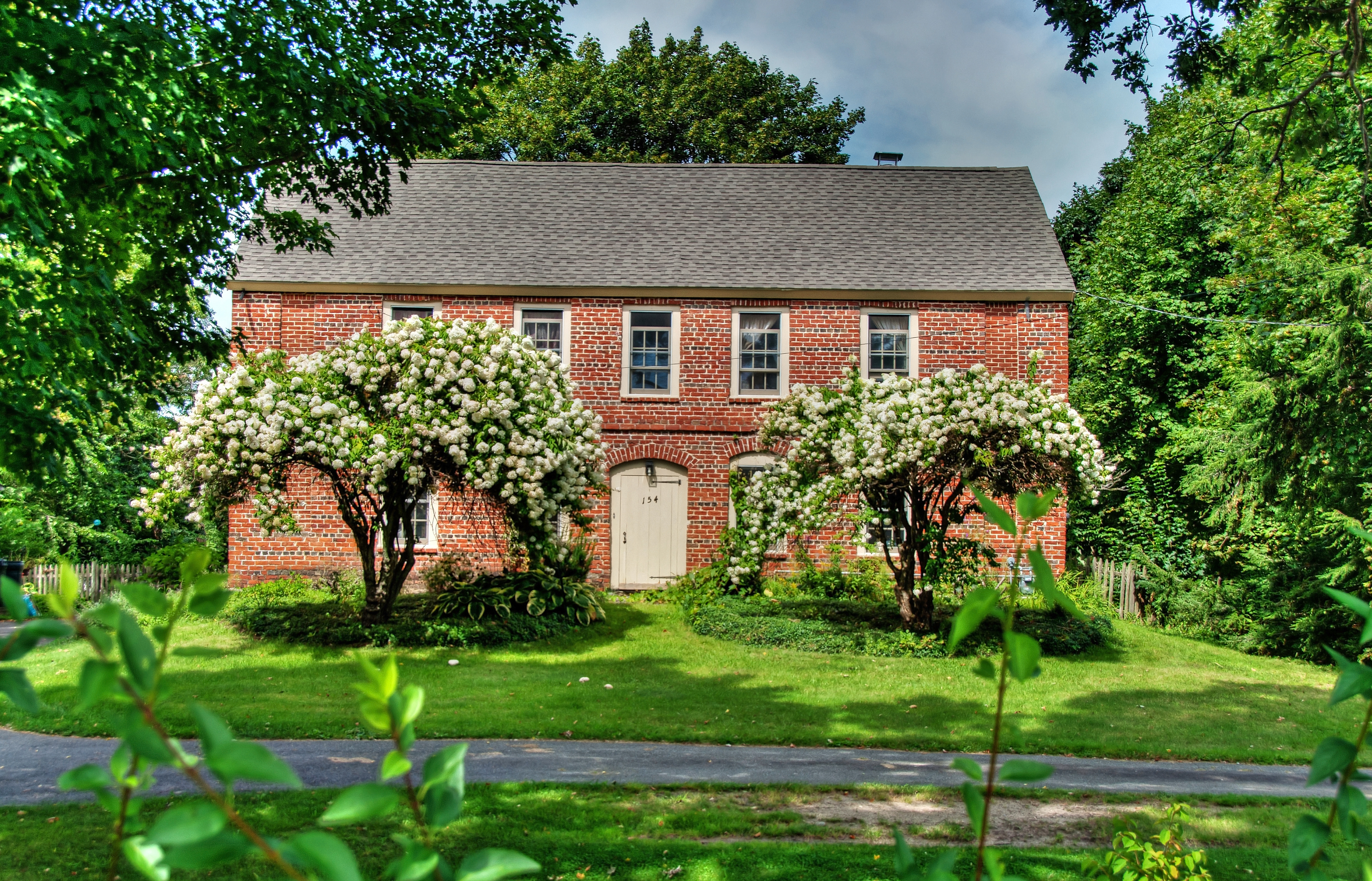
- Samuel Chase House

- Location within Massachusetts Location within the United States
- Location: 154 Main Street, West Newbury, Massachusetts
- Coordinates: 42°47′17″N 71°0′6″W
- Built: 1715
- Architectural style: Colonial
- MPS: First Period Buildings of Eastern Massachusetts TR
- NRHP reference No.: 90000273
- Added to NRHP: March 9, 1990

The Samuel Chase House is a historic First Period house in West Newbury, Massachusetts. Built c. 1715, it is a rare example of a brick house built during the transition between First Period and Georgian styling and construction methods. A story passed down through the Chase family says that bricks for the house were made on the family's farm and were carried to the homesite by Hannah Chase in her apron. The brick is laid in English bond, and the building is seven bays wide and two stories high. The outermost window bays have been bricked over, leaving the front facade with five windows on the second floor, and two on either side of a central front door in the first floor. The first floor windows and doorway are in arched spaces in the brickwork, while those on the second floor are rectangular. The house underwent a major restoration in 1986.

The house was listed on the National Historic Register in 1990.

The home of his son, Amos Chase, in Saco, Maine, also still stands.

== See also ==
- List of the oldest buildings in Massachusetts
- National Register of Historic Places listings in Essex County, Massachusetts
