= Leatrice Morin =

American politician

Leatrice M. Morin

Member of the Maine House of Representatives (District 117)
- In office 1973–1976
- Preceded by: William F. Farrington
- Succeeded by: John M. Kerry

Personal details
- Born: October 23, 1922 Saco, Maine
- Died: July 1, 2009 (aged 86) Biddeford, Maine
- Party: Democrat
- Education: Southern Maine Vocational Technical Institute

Leatrice M. Morin (October 23, 1922 - July 1, 2009) was an American politician from Maine. Morin, a Democrat from Old Orchard Beach, Maine, served in the Maine House of Representatives from 1973 to 1976.

Morin was born in Saco, Maine in 1922 and graduated from Thornton Academy in 1940. She is a graduate of the Southern Maine Vocational Technical Institute.

She was born Oct. 23, 122 in Saco, a daughter of Niles [Nils] and Rose (Cartier) Lundstrom. She attended Notre Dame School, and graduated Thornton Academy in 1940. She also attended Southern Maine Vocational Technical Institute (SMVTI, now Southern Maine Community College.

On 16 Nov 1946, she married Arnold H. Morin, who died 17 August 1982.

She worked at various times for the Saco City Clerk, Saco Lowell Shops, Bates Manufacturing, and the New England Telephone Company, and Snow Canning in Scarborough. She retired from SMVTI in 1985. She was preceded in death by her husband, Arnold Morin, a brother, Stanton Lundstrom, and sisters Pearl Irene (Lundstrom) Amello, and Alma (Lundstrom) Nelson. She is survived by a son, David S. Morin, a daughter Kathleen Stryker (George), and numerous grandchildren, great grandchildren, and other relatives.
