= 1969 Wesleyan Cardinals football team =

American college football season

1969 Wesleyan Cardinals football

Lambert Cup co-champion Little Three champion
- Conference: Little Three
- Record: 8–0 (2–0 Little Three)
- Head coach: Donald Russell (6th season)
- Captain: Jeff Diamond
- Home stadium: Andrus Field

1969 Little Three Conference football standings
	Conf.					Overall
Team	W		L		T	W		L		T
Wesleyan $	2	–	0	–	0	8	–	0	–	0
Amherst	1	–	1	–	0	6	–	2	–	0
Williams	0	–	2	–	0	4	–	4	–	0
$ – Conference champion

The 1969 Wesleyan Cardinals football team, also known as the Wesleyan Methodists, was an American football that represented Wesleyan University as a member of the Little Three during the 1969 NCAA College Division football season. In their sixth season under head coach Donald Russell, the Cardinals compiled a perfect 8–0 record, won the Little Three championship, and outscored opponents by a total of 170 to 106. It was Wesleyan's first perfect season since 1948.

Frank Waters played at end on offense and at halfback on defense and received the Bacon Trophy as Wesleyan's most valuable player. Four Wesleyan players were selected as first-team players on the 1969 United Press International - New England Football Coaches Association All-New England college division team: offensive tackle Jeff Diamond; center Brian Hersey; and defensive backs Greg Forbes and Paul Woods. Quarterback Pete Panciera, fullback Dave Revenaugh, and linebacker Casey Watters were named to the second team.

== Schedule ==
Date	Opponent	Site	Result	Attendance	Source
September 27	Middlebury*	Andrus Field; Middletown, CT	W 21–20		
October 4	at Bowdoin*	Whittier Fiel; Brunswick, ME	W 21–10		
October 11	Coast Guard*	Andrus Field; Middletown, CT	W 16–7	3,000	
October 18	at WPI*	Worcester, MA	W 21–13	4,300	
October 25	at Amherst	Pratt Field; Amherst, MA	W 28–13	7,000	
November 1	Hamilton*	Andrus Field; Middletown, CT	W 24–8	2,000	
November 8	Williams	Andrus Field; Middletown, CT	W 18–17	9,000	
November 15	at Trinity (CT)*	Jessee Field; Harford, CT (rivalry )	W 21–18	7,000	
*Non-conference game
