= Amos Chase =

Amos Chase (1718–1818) was the first deacon of the first Congregational Church and one of the founders of Pepperellborough, Maine (which is now Saco, Maine).

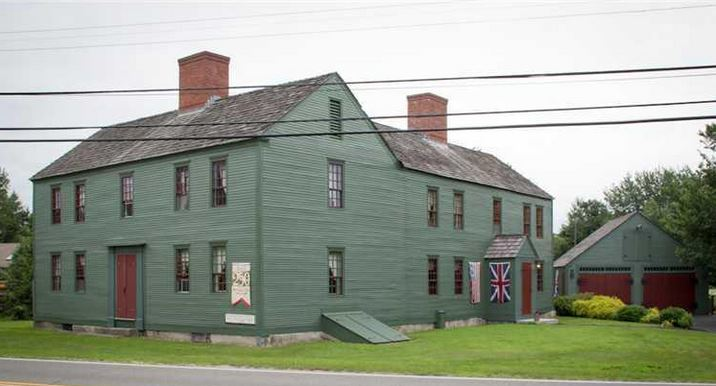
Amos Chase house, 144 Ferry Road, Saco, Maine. The house was originally two separate houses, one of which Chase brought over (using logs as rollers) and joined with the other one to accommodate his large family.

Dea. Chase was one of the pioneers in the area. He first came to Saco in about 1734, and soon after the division of the Humphrey Scamman property in 1736, purchased a part of the estate at the lower ferry and built an ordinary (tavern) there. He kept the ferry for several years, and was one of the builders of the first bridge on the west side of Indian Island. He drove the first team of oxen to Saco, Maine, and moved there in 1741. His daughter was the first white child born in the town. Due to Indian wars, he moved to Newbury in 1744, then back to Saco in 1753.

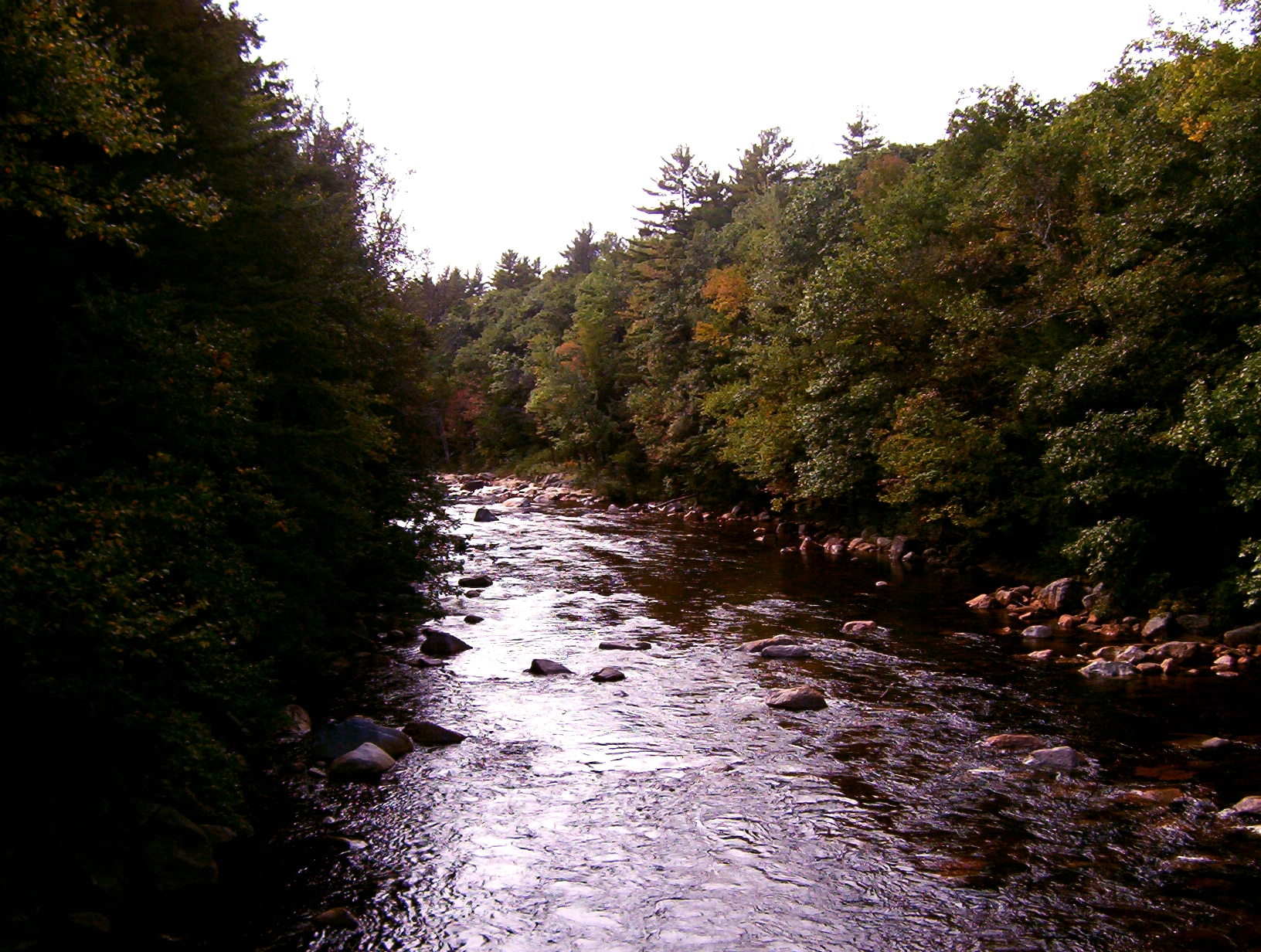
The Saco River

He was chosen as selectman at the first town meeting of Pepperellborough in 1762. Chase was active during the Revolutionary War, serving on the town's first Committee of Correspondence and on its Committee of Inspection.

He was a lumberman and farmer, and prominent in religious and civic matters relating to the town and the Saco River. Chase was one of the largest taxpayers in the area. He was described as "stately and commanding in figure, six feet in height, vigorous and erect even in old age, eloquent in conversation and pre-eminently so in prayer." "His tongue seemed oiled from root to tip expressing eloquence. I thought him the finest looking old man I ever saw, long hair down over his shoulders, white as snow..." Chase lived to be 100 years old.

Chase's house in Saco, Maine, still exists (as a private residence) and has been recently restored. The house in which he was born, the Samuel Chase House in West Newbury, Massachusetts, also still stands, and is a rare example of a brick house of the period.
