= Dayton, Maine =

Town in Maine, United States

- Town
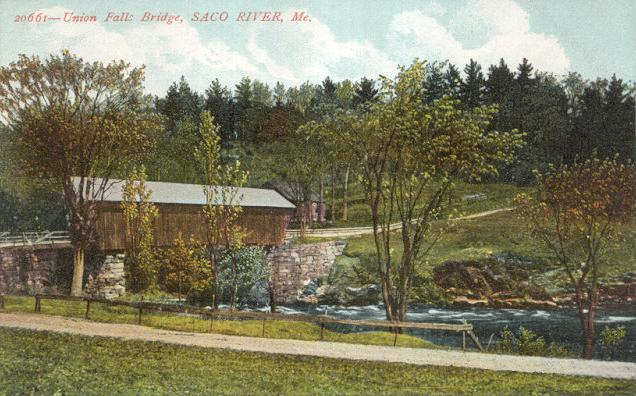
- Union Falls Bridge, c. 1908

- Seal

- Location within Maine Location within the United States
- Coordinates: 43°32′34″N 70°34′46″W
- Country: United States
- State: Maine
- County: York
- Incorporated: 1854

Government
  - Type: Board of Selectmen

Area
  - Total: 18.40 sq mi (47.66 km^{2})
  - Land: 17.89 sq mi (46.33 km^{2})
  - Water: 0.51 sq mi (1.32 km^{2})
- Elevation: 200 ft (61 m)

Population (2020)
  - Total: 2,129
  - Density: 120/sq mi (46/km^{2})
- Time zone: UTC-5 (Eastern (EST))
  - Summer (DST): UTC-4 (EDT)
- ZIP code: 04005
- Area code: 207
- FIPS code: 23-16725
- GNIS feature ID: 582434
- Website: www.dayton-me.gov

Dayton is a town in York County, Maine, United States; the town is located near the Saco-Biddeford city area. Dayton borders Biddeford by land, and borders Saco on the Saco River. It is also part of the Portland-South Portland-Biddeford metropolitan area. The population was 2,129 at the 2020 census.

== History ==
The area was once inhabited by the Sokokis (or Saco) Indigenous peoples, who hunted and fished along the Saco River. The old Sokokis Trail is now Route 5, which passes through Dayton. In 1664, Major William Phillips purchased from the sagamore the land which would become Little Falls Plantation—today the towns of Hollis, Dayton and part of Limington. In 1728, a stockaded fort which contained a trading post was built a half mile below Union Falls. Called the Saco Truck House or Saco Block House, the garrison was maintained throughout the French and Indian War until the fall of Quebec in 1759.

Settlers arrived in 1753, and lumbering became a principal industry. Logs were rolled down the banks of the Saco River and floated to sawmills at Saco. Nathaniel Goodwin established the first local mill in 1782 at Goodwins Mills, where falls in Swan Brook drop 33 feet (10 m). A sawmill and gristmill were erected at Union Falls (then called Hopkinson's Mill) in 1806. Tanneries were built, and land was cleared for farms. In 1798, Little Falls Plantation was incorporated as Phillipsburg, in honor of Major William Phillips—but only until 1810. Considered difficult to pronounce and write, the Phillipsburg was changed to Hollis. Then, in 1854, the southern part of Hollis petitioned the state legislature to become a separate town. Permission was granted, and the community was named Dayton after Thomas Day, who submitted the petition.

In 1860, Dayton voted to build at Union Falls a covered bridge, 112 feet (34 m) long and 18 feet (5.5 m) wide, connecting to Buxton. The span was blown up in 1921 by the Clark Power Company, an event filmed as part of a melodrama by the Pine Tree Moving Picture Corporation of Portland. The Great Fires of 1947 destroyed two-thirds of Dayton, including 27 homes, four barns and the town hall. In 1951, the Central Maine Power Company built a hydroelectric dam, Skelton Dam, between Salmon Falls and Union Falls, submerging the scenic gorge. With the submergence of the gorge, the road that ran perpendicular to the covered bridge was cut off. A new road called Company Road was built to replace it. Once a community of dairy farms, Dayton is now primarily residential.

== Geography ==
According to the United States Census Bureau, the town has a total area of 18.40 square miles (47.66 km^{2}), of which 17.89 square miles (46.33 km^{2}) is land and 0.51 square miles (1.32 km^{2}) is water. Dayton is drained by the Saco River.

Maine-State routes 5 and 35 intersect in Dayton, while U.S. Route 202 and Interstate 95 pass outside the town limits. The town borders Lyman, Hollis, and Buxton, as well as the cities of Saco and Biddeford.

== Demographics ==
Historical population
Census	Pop.	Note	%±
1860	701		—
1870	611		−12.8%
1880	592		−3.1%
1890	500		−15.5%
1900	473		−5.4%
1910	395		−16.5%
1920	391		−1.0%
1930	379		−3.1%
1940	454		19.8%
1950	502		10.6%
1960	451		−10.2%
1970	546		21.1%
1980	882		61.5%
1990	1,197		35.7%
2000	1,805		50.8%
2010	1,965		8.9%
2020	2,129		8.3%
U.S. Decennial Census

=== 2010 census ===
As of the census of 2010, there were 1,965 people, 712 households, and 547 families living in the town. The population density was 109.8 inhabitants per square mile (42.4/km^{2}). There were 753 housing units at an average density of 42.1 units per square mile (16.3 units/km^{2}). The racial makeup of the town was 97.6% White, 0.8% African American, 0.5% Native American, 0.1% Asian, 0.1% from other races, and 0.9% from two or more races. Hispanic or Latino of any race were 0.8% of the population.

There were 712 households, of which 40.0% had children under the age of 18 living with them, 64.9% were married couples living together, 9.4% had a female householder with no husband present, 2.5% had a male householder with no wife present, and 23.2% were non-families. 15.9% of all households were made up of individuals, and 4.6% had someone living alone who was 65 years of age or older. The average household size was 2.76 and the average family size was 3.11.

The median age in the town was 40.5 years. 25.7% of residents were under the age of 18; 5.5% were between the ages of 18 and 24; 27.7% were from 25 to 44; 31.8% were from 45 to 64; and 9.3% were 65 years of age or older. The gender makeup of the town was 51.6% male and 48.4% female.

=== 2000 census ===
As of the census of 2000, there were 1,805 people, 638 households, and 509 families living in the town. The population density was 100.9 inhabitants per square mile (39.0/km^{2}). There were 663 housing units at an average density of 37.1 units per square mile (14.3 units/km^{2}). The racial makeup of the town was 98.50% White, 0.17% Native American, 0.28% Asian, 0.22% from other races, and 0.83% from two or more races. Hispanic or Latino of any race were 0.39% of the population.

There were 638 households, out of which 44.4% had children under the age of 18 living with them, 69.6% were married couples living together, 6.1% had a female householder with no husband present, and 20.1% were non-families. 14.7% of all households were made up of individuals, and 5.2% had someone living alone who was 65 years of age or older. The average household size was 2.83 and the average family size was 3.13.

In the town, the population was spread out, with 29.5% under the age of 18, 4.1% from 18 to 24, 37.1% from 25 to 44, 21.4% from 45 to 64, and 7.8% who were 65 years of age or older. The median age was 35 years. For every 100 females, there were 104.6 males. For every 100 females age 18 and over, there were 95.1 males.

The median income for a household in the town was $53,056, and the median income for a family was $57,692. Males had a median income of $38,150 versus $25,956 for females. The per capita income for the town was $20,629. About 2.9% of families and 3.5% of the population were below the poverty line, including 4.5% of those under age 18 and 8.1% of those age 65 or over.

== Education ==
Dayton children in grades K–5 attend the Dayton Consolidated School, which, as of July 1, 2014, became its own school district, sharing superintendent and other administrative tasks with the Biddeford School System. It was previously part of Regional School Union #23. Prior to July 2014, students from grades 6–8 attended Saco Middle School, but as of July 2014 attend Thornton Academy Middle School. Prior to July 2014, students in grades 9–12 attended Thornton Academy, but as of July 2014 have a choice between Thornton and Biddeford High School.
