= Arundel, Maine =

Town in Maine, United States

- Town
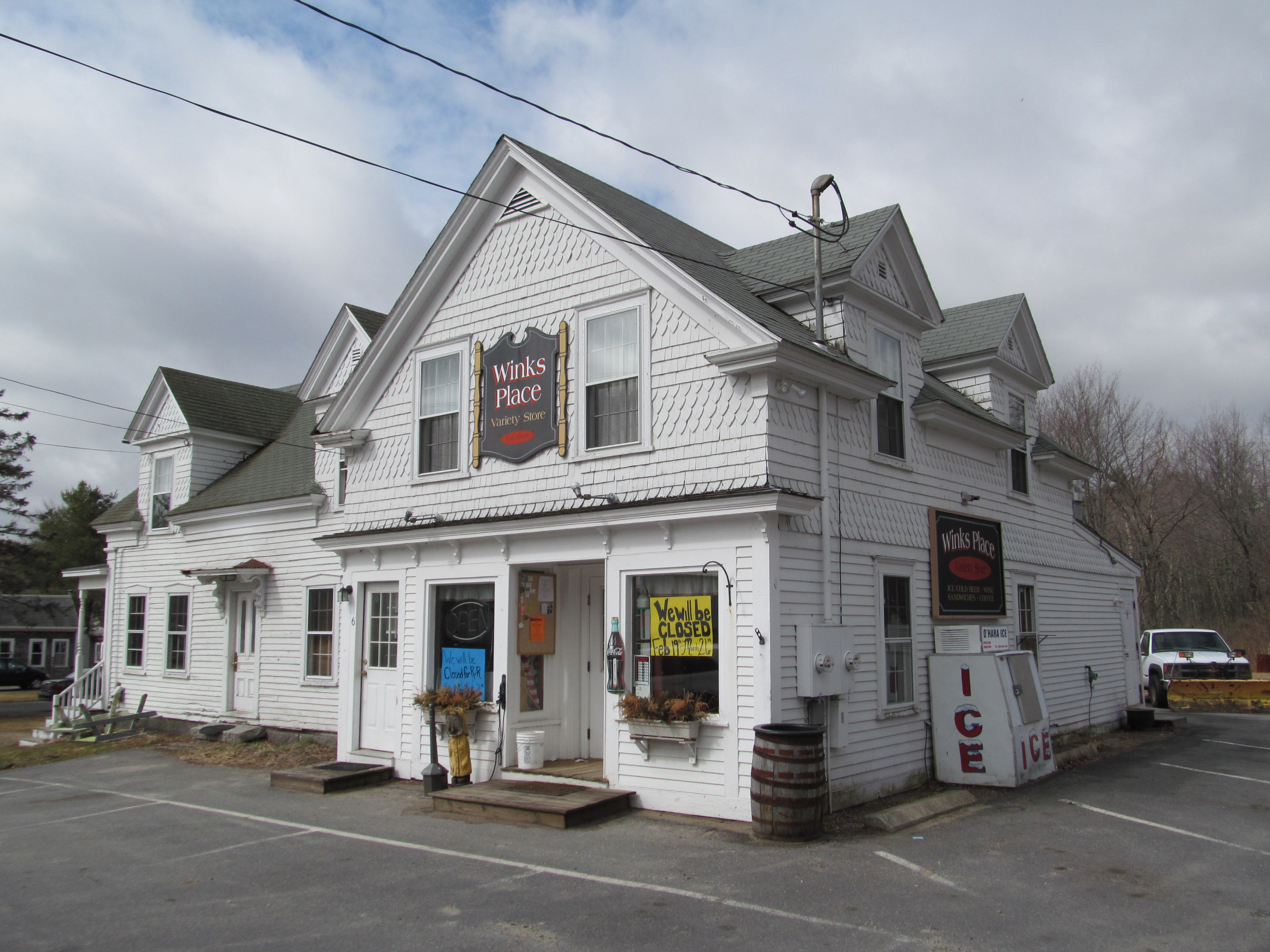
- Winks Place
- Motto: Where People Matter
- Location within Maine
- Coordinates: 43°23′24″N 70°30′31″W
- Country: United States
- State: Maine
- County: York
- Incorporated: 1915

Government
  - Type: Board of Selectmen

Area
  - Total: 23.90 sq mi (61.90 km^{2})
  - Land: 23.87 sq mi (61.82 km^{2})
  - Water: 0.031 sq mi (0.08 km^{2})
- Elevation: 131 ft (40 m)

Population (2020)
  - Total: 4,264
  - Density: 180/sq mi (69/km^{2})
- Time zone: UTC-5 (Eastern (EST))
  - Summer (DST): UTC-4 (EDT)
- ZIP code: 04046
- Area code: 207
- FIPS code: 23-01605
- GNIS feature ID: 582330
- Website: www.arundelmaine.org

Arundel is a town in York County, Maine, United States. At the 2020 census, the population was 4,264. It is part of the Portland-South Portland-Biddeford metropolitan area. The Municipality of Arundel includes the constituent communities and neighbourhoods of: Arundel Village, Vinegar Hill, Riverside Arundel, Log Cabin Crossing, Goff Mill, Millers Crossing, and Cottagehill (Cape Arundel Cottage Preserve), among other neighbourhoods in an inland area adjacent to the Towns of Kennebunkport and Biddeford. In 2014, Arundel was named "Best Place to Live in Maine" by Downeast Magazine.

== History ==
The area now known as Arundel, while sometimes referred to by that name, was part of Kennebunkport until 1915, when it was set off and named North Kennebunkport. In 1957, following the publication of Kenneth Roberts's Chronicles of Arundel, the state legislature renamed the town for Lord Arundel.

Kennebunkport itself had been called Arundel from 1701 to 1821, when it received its present name. The name Arundel originally came from the town of Arundel in West Sussex, England.

== Geography ==
According to the United States Census Bureau, the town has a total area of 23.90 square miles (61.90 km^{2}), of which 23.87 square miles (61.82 km^{2}) is land and 0.03 square miles (0.08 km^{2}) is water. Arundel is drained by the Kennebunk River.

The town is crossed by Interstate 95, U.S. Route 1 and state routes 35 and 111. It is bordered by the towns of Kennebunkport to the southeast, Kennebunk to the southwest, Lyman to the northwest, Dayton to the north, and Biddeford to the northeast.

== Demographics ==
Historical population
Census	Pop.	Note	%±
1790	1,458		—
1800	1,900		30.3%
1810	2,371		24.8%
1820	2,478		4.5%
1920	564		—
1930	545		−3.4%
1940	866		58.9%
1950	939		8.4%
1960	907		−3.4%
1970	1,322		45.8%
1980	2,150		62.6%
1990	2,669		24.1%
2000	3,571		33.8%
2010	4,022		12.6%
2020	4,264		6.0%

=== 2010 census ===
As of the census of 2010, there were 4,022 people, 1,569 households, and 1,109 families living in the town. The population density was 168.5 inhabitants per square mile (65.1/km^{2}). There were 1,692 housing units at an average density of 70.9 per square mile (27.4/km^{2}). The racial makeup of the town was 96.6% White, 0.4% African American, 0.5% Native American, 0.8% Asian, 0.2% from other races, and 1.5% from two or more races. Hispanic or Latino of any race were 1.0% of the population.

There were 1,569 households, of which 31.5% had children under the age of 18 living with them, 57.2% were married couples living together, 8.7% had a female householder with no husband present, 4.8% had a male householder with no wife present, and 29.3% were non-families. 20.8% of all households were made up of individuals, and 7.4% had someone living alone who was 65 years of age or older. The average household size was 2.56 and the average family size was 2.96.

The median age in the town was 42.9 years. 22% of residents were under the age of 18; 6.7% were between the ages of 18 and 24; 24.6% were from 25 to 44; 34.7% were from 45 to 64; and 12.2% were 65 years of age or older. The gender makeup of the town was 49.2% male and 50.8% female.

=== 2000 census ===
As of the census of 2000, there were 3,571 people, 1,363 households, and 999 families living in the town. The population density was 149.3 inhabitants per square mile (57.6/km^{2}). There were 1,415 housing units at an average density of 59.2 per square mile (22.9/km^{2}). The racial makeup of the town was 98.26% White, 0.14% African American, 0.45% Native American, 0.39% Asian, 0.06% Pacific Islander, 0.14% from other races, and 0.56% from two or more races. Hispanic or Latino of any race were 0.50% of the population.

There were 1,363 households, out of which 35.6% had children under the age of 18 living with them, 61.3% were married couples living together, 8.5% had a female householder with no husband present, and 26.7% were non-families. 19.4% of all households were made up of individuals, and 5.9% had someone living alone who was 65 years of age or older. The average household size was 2.61 and the average family size was 3.01.

In the town, 26.1% of the residential population is under the age of 18, 6.2% is from 18 to 24, 32.5% from 25 to 44, 27.1% from 45 to 64, and 8.1% were 65 years of age or older. The median age was 37 years. For every 100 females, there were 97.5 males. For every 100 females age 18 and over, there were 97.0 males.

The median income for a household in the town was $49,484, and the median income for a family was $50,709. Males had a median income of $35,517 versus $25,684 for females. The per capita income for the town was $20,538. About 5.0% of families and 5.4% of the population were below the poverty line, including 9.6% of those under age 18 and 4.5% of those age 65 or over.

== Education ==
Arundel is part of the RSU21 school district, which encompasses the towns of Arundel, Kennebunk, and Kennebunkport. Prior to being included in the RSU21, students from the town of Arundel were given the option to attend Thornton Academy (9–12 grade), starting with Thornton Academy Middle School (6–8 grade) when it was built, with tuition being covered by the town of Arundel. RSU21 fought this school choice option, resulting in a three-year court battle. The effort to suppress school choice was ended. The option to attend Thornton Academy schools is still being preserved as of the ruling by the Maine Supreme Judicial Court on July 18, 2019.

Mildred L. Day School is the elementary school for the children of Arundel, from grades kindergarten to fifth grade.

== Adjacent towns ==
- Biddeford
- Dayton
- Kennebunk
- Kennebunkport
- Lyman
