= Lyman, Maine =

Town in Maine, United States

- Town
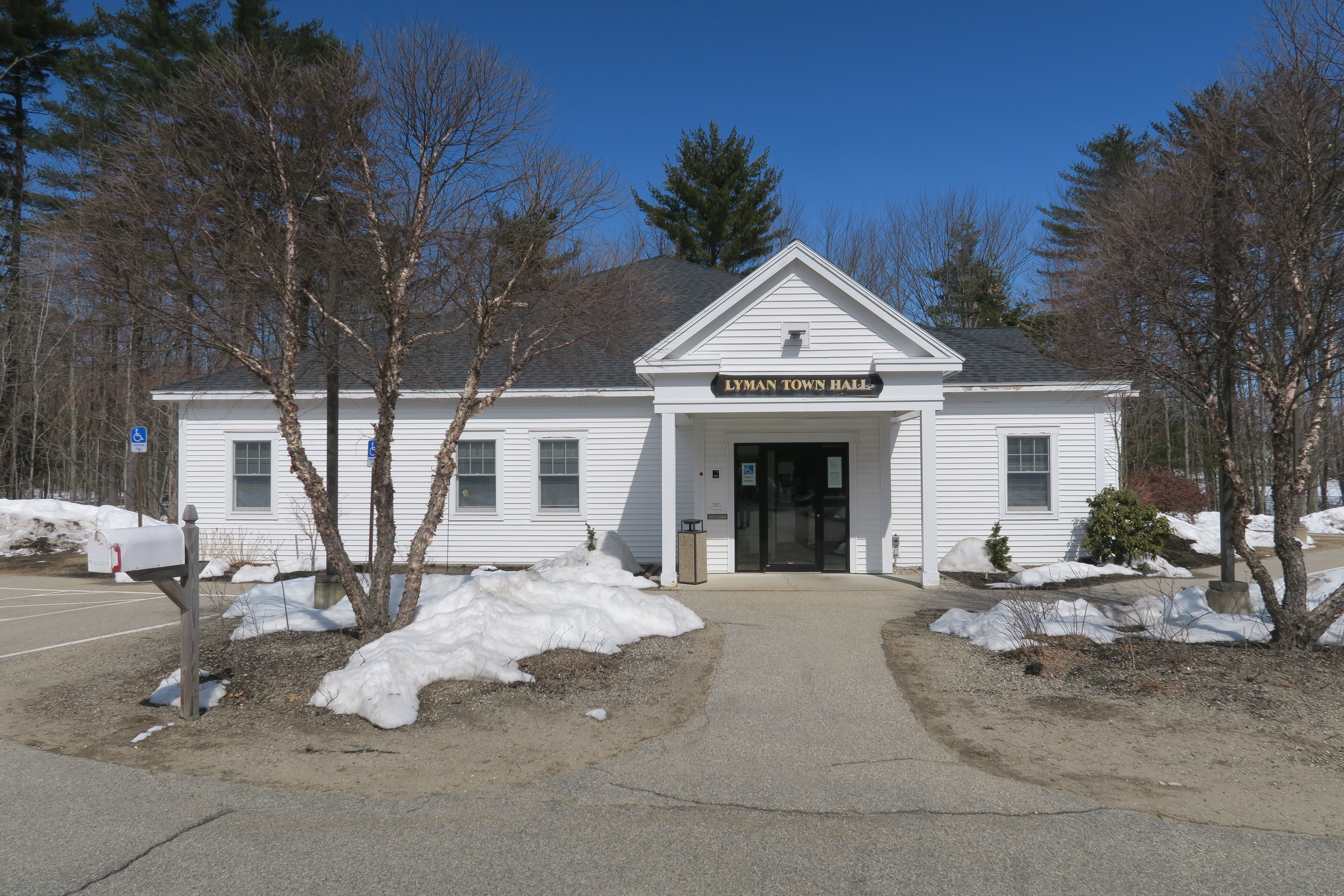
- Lyman Town Hall

- Location within the state of Maine Lyman (the United States)
- Coordinates: 43°30′09″N 70°38′21″W
- Country: United States
- State: Maine
- County: York
- Incorporated: 1780

Area
  - Total: 40.49 sq mi (104.87 km^{2})
  - Land: 38.99 sq mi (100.98 km^{2})
  - Water: 1.50 sq mi (3.88 km^{2})
- Elevation: 269 ft (82 m)

Population (2020)
  - Total: 4,525
  - Density: 116/sq mi (44.8/km^{2})
- Time zone: UTC-5 (Eastern (EST))
  - Summer (DST): UTC-4 (EDT)
- ZIP code: 04002
- Area code: 207
- FIPS code: 23-41750
- GNIS feature ID: 582572
- Website: www.lyman-me.gov

Lyman is a town in York County, Maine, United States. The population was 4,525 at the 2020 census. It is part of the Portland–South Portland–Biddeford, Maine metropolitan statistical area. Lyman, together with Alfred, is home to the Massabesic Experimental Forest.

== History ==
In 1660, John Sanders, John Bush and Peter Turbat purchased from the Abenaki sachem Sosowen and his son Fluellin what is now the township of Lyman. First called Swanfield, it was settled in 1767. While the original settlers are not known for certain, early records and deeds mention the following: William and Jacob Waterhouse (of Kennebunk), Love Roberts, Alexander Grant, Thomas Lord, Jacob Rhoades, Benjamin and Mark Goodwin (brothers who built one of the first mills at Goodwin's Mills), John Low (who served as town moderator and treasurer), John Burbank, Joseph Witten, James and William Brock, Mark Ricker, Robert Cousens, Valentine Hill, and Gershom Downs.

Swanfield would be incorporated by the Massachusetts General Court on April 24, 1780, as Coxhall, probably after Coggeshall (pronounced Coxhall) in Essex, England. On February 25, 1803, the name was changed to Lyman in honor of Theodore Lyman I, a wealthy merchant who established a successful shipping firm in the 1790s at York before moving to Boston.

Farmers found the surface of the town moderately uneven, with fair soil that yielded good crops of grain, hay and apples. Watermills were established at the outlets of the larger ponds, with two sawmills at Swan Pond and another at Kennebunk Pond. Lumbering was a considerable source of income for many inhabitants. In 1782, a sawmill and gristmill were erected at Goodwin's Mills, which developed into the town's only business and trade center, despite the fact that some of the village is actually located in Dayton. The Great Fires of 1947 devastated part of Lyman. Today, the town is largely a bedroom community.

== Geography ==
According to the United States Census Bureau, the town has a total area of 40.49 square miles (104.87 km^{2}), of which 38.99 square miles (100.98 km^{2}) is land and 1.50 square miles (3.88 km^{2}) is water. Lyman is drained by the Kennebunk River.

The town is crossed by U.S. Route 202 and State Routes 5, 35 and 111. It is bordered by the towns of Hollis and Dayton to the northeast, Arundel and Kennebunk to the southeast, Alfred to the southwest, and Waterboro to the northwest.

== Demographics ==
Historical population
Census	Pop.	Note	%±
1790	765		—
1800	995		30.1%
1810	1,248		25.4%
1820	1,387		11.1%
1830	1,503		8.4%
1840	1,478		−1.7%
1850	1,376		−6.9%
1860	1,307		−5.0%
1870	1,052		−19.5%
1880	1,004		−4.6%
1890	854		−14.9%
1900	687		−19.6%
1910	615		−10.5%
1920	415		−32.5%
1930	370		−10.8%
1940	385		4.1%
1950	499		29.6%
1960	529		6.0%
1970	864		63.3%
1980	2,509		190.4%
1990	3,390		35.1%
2000	3,795		11.9%
2010	4,344		14.5%
2020	4,525		4.2%
U.S. Decennial Census

=== 2010 census ===
As of the census of 2010, there were 4,344 people, 1,660 households, and 1,269 families living in the town. The population density was 111.4 inhabitants per square mile (43.0/km^{2}). There were 2,067 housing units at an average density of 53.0 per square mile (20.5/km^{2}). The racial makeup of the town was 97.8% White, 0.2% African American, 0.2% Native American, 0.4% Asian, and 1.4% from two or more races. Hispanic or Latino of any race were 0.7% of the population.

There were 1,660 households, of which 31.1% had children under the age of 18 living with them, 64.6% were married couples living together, 7.5% had a female householder with no husband present, 4.3% had a male householder with no wife present, and 23.6% were non-families. 16.9% of all households were made up of individuals, and 6.7% had someone living alone who was 65 years of age or older. The average household size was 2.62 and the average family size was 2.91.

The median age in the town was 43.3 years. 21.5% of residents were under the age of 18; 6.3% were between the ages of 18 and 24; 24.7% were from 25 to 44; 34.2% were from 45 to 64; and 13.2% were 65 years of age or older. The gender makeup of the town was 49.6% male and 50.4% female.

=== 2000 census ===
As of the census of 2000, there were 3,795 people, 1,366 households, and 1,087 families living in the town. The population density was 97.5 inhabitants per square mile (37.6/km^{2}). There were 1,749 housing units at an average density of 44.9 per square mile (17.3/km^{2}). The racial makeup of the town was 98.45% White, 0.29% African American, 0.26% Native American, 0.24% Asian, 0.11% from other races, and 0.66% from two or more races. Hispanic or Latino of any race were 0.32% of the population.

There were 1,366 households, out of which 37.3% had children under the age of 18 living with them, 68.6% were married couples living together, 7.2% had a female householder with no husband present, and 20.4% were non-families. 12.5% of all households were made up of individuals, and 3.5% had someone living alone who was 65 years of age or older. The average household size was 2.78 and the average family size was 3.04.

In the town, the population was spread out, with 26.5% under the age of 18, 6.5% from 18 to 24, 31.1% from 25 to 44, 27.7% from 45 to 64, and 8.2% who were 65 years of age or older. The median age was 38 years. For every 100 females, there were 99.3 males. For every 100 females age 18 and over, there were 95.7 males.

The median income for a household in the town was $47,860, and the median income for a family was $53,140. Males had a median income of $37,917 versus $25,192 for females. The per capita income for the town was $20,203. About 4.8% of families and 4.3% of the population were below the poverty line, including 2.4% of those under age 18 and 5.7% of those age 65 or over.
