= Buxton, Maine =

- Town
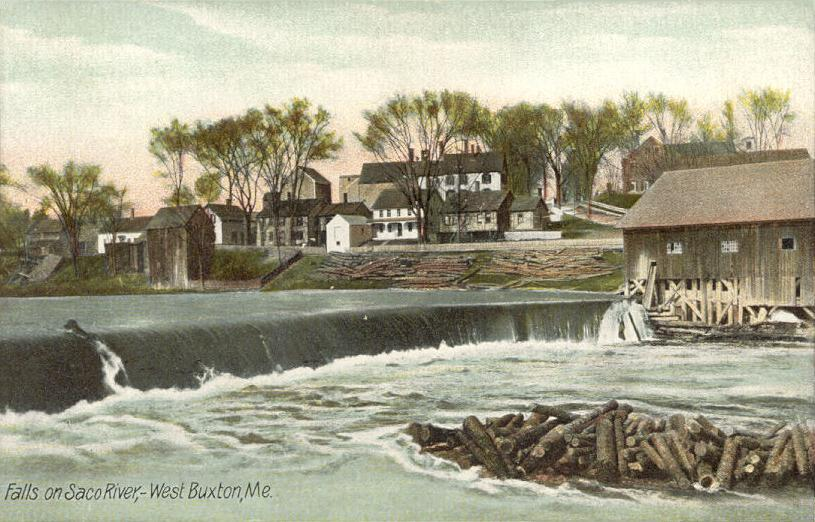
- Falls on Saco River c. 1908

- Seal

- Location within Maine Location within the United States
- Coordinates: 43°37′07″N 70°31′20″W
- Country: United States
- State: Maine
- County: York
- Incorporated: 1772

Government
  - Type: Town Meeting

Area
  - Total: 41.23 sq mi (106.79 km^{2})
  - Land: 40.52 sq mi (104.95 km^{2})
  - Water: 0.71 sq mi (1.84 km^{2})
- Elevation: 180 ft (55 m)

Population (2020)
  - Total: 8,376
  - Density: 207/sq mi (79.8/km^{2})
- Time zone: UTC-5 (Eastern (EST))
  - Summer (DST): UTC-4 (EDT)
- ZIP Codes: 04093 (Buxton); 04004 (Bar Mills)
- Area code: 207
- FIPS code: 23-09410
- GNIS feature ID: 582380
- Website: buxton.me.us

Buxton is a town in York County, Maine, United States. It is part of the Portland metropolitan area. The population was 8,376 at the 2020 census. Buxton includes the villages of Salmon Falls/Tory Hill, Chicopee, Groveville, Bar Mills, West Buxton, and Buxton Center. The old town Common is east of Union Falls, which is the location of Skelton Dam, operated by Central Maine Power, and near historic location of the original settlement at Pleasant Point.

== History ==
The township was granted by the Massachusetts General Court as Narragansett Number 1 in 1728. It was assigned to Philemon Dane of Ipswich, Massachusetts and 119 other veterans (or their heirs) who had fought in King Philip's War against the Narragansett people in 1675. Settlement was attempted in the early 1740s but abandoned because of the ongoing French and Indian Wars.

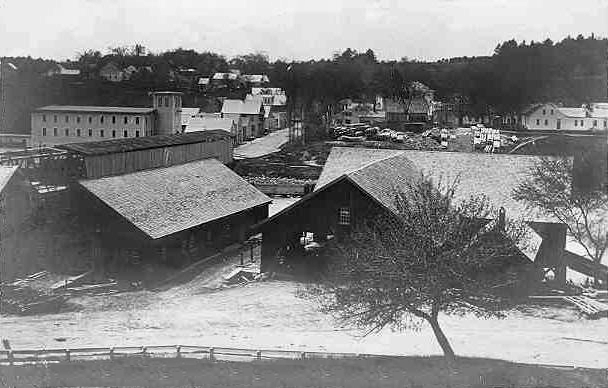
West Buxton lumber mills, 1919

The first permanent settlement commenced in fall of 1750 near Salmon Falls, which was within protection of the stockaded blockhouse and trading post built in 1728 a half mile below Union Falls in present-day Dayton. Amos Chase was one of the pioneers of the town, and his daughter was said to be the first white child born in Buxton. He was a prominent figure in the area, one of the largest taxpayers, and was the first deacon of the Congregational Church in Pepperellborough (present-day Saco, ME). The first schoolhouse in Buxton was established in 1761 by Rev. Silas Moody. Narragansett Number 1 was incorporated in 1772 as Buxton. It was named by its minister, Rev. Paul Coffin for the spa town of Buxton in Derbyshire, England, for unknown reasons. Buxton, England is often incorrectly cited as the home of his ancestors, but that was Brixton as noted on page 7 of the cited source(2).

Settlers found the land generally level and suited for farming. Chief crops were corn, potatoes and hay. Buxton also provided excellent water power sites. The first sawmill was on the Little River, a tributary of the Presumpscot River. A gristmill called Bog Mill was built at the outlet of Bonny Eagle Pond. The biggest mills, however, were located at the series of falls on the Saco River. Salmon Falls had sawmills capable of turning out four million feet of lumber annually. Bar Mills had gristmills and a box mill. Moderation Falls in West Buxton had sawmills, heading mills and woolen textile mills which produced about 936,000 yards of cloth annually. Buxton's mill town prosperity left behind fine architecture. Listed on the National Register of Historic Places are Elden's Store, the Buxton Powder House, the First Congregational Church, Royal Brewster House and Salmon Falls (East) Historic District.

== Geography ==
According to the United States Census Bureau, the town has a total area of 41.23 square miles (106.79 km^{2}), of which 40.52 square miles (104.95 km^{2}) is land and 0.71 square miles (1.84 km^{2}) is water. Buxton is drained by Little River and the Saco River. Bonny Eagle Pond is a 211-acre (0.85 km^{2}) body of water located in the northern part of the town.

Buxton borders the towns of Gorham to the northeast, Scarborough and Saco to the southeast, Dayton to the south, Hollis to the west and Standish to the northwest.

=== Climate ===
The climate is humid continental, similar to nearby towns such as Concord, New Hampshire. The Köppen is Dfb.

Climate data for West Buxton (1953–2012 normals)
Month	Jan	Feb	Mar	Apr	May	Jun	Jul	Aug	Sep	Oct	Nov	Dec	Year
Record high °F (°C)	69 (21)	63 (17)	88 (31)	94 (34)	94 (34)	95 (35)	98 (37)	98 (37)	97 (36)	87 (31)	74 (23)	70 (21)	98 (37)
Mean daily maximum °F (°C)	30.7 (−0.7)	34.1 (1.2)	42.4 (5.8)	54.7 (12.6)	66.4 (19.1)	75.1 (23.9)	79.9 (26.6)	78.5 (25.8)	70.5 (21.4)	59.3 (15.2)	47.0 (8.3)	35.2 (1.8)	56.2 (13.4)
Mean daily minimum °F (°C)	6.8 (−14.0)	8.5 (−13.1)	19.7 (−6.8)	30.3 (−0.9)	40.5 (4.7)	50.6 (10.3)	56.0 (13.3)	54.1 (12.3)	45.8 (7.7)	34.8 (1.6)	26.5 (−3.1)	14.0 (−10.0)	32.3 (0.2)
Record low °F (°C)	−34 (−37)	−32 (−36)	−22 (−30)	5 (−15)	20 (−7)	32 (0)	38 (3)	30 (−1)	23 (−5)	12 (−11)	−3 (−19)	−31 (−35)	−34 (−37)
Average precipitation inches (mm)	3.38 (86)	3.34 (85)	4.07 (103)	4.27 (108)	3.97 (101)	3.78 (96)	3.64 (92)	3.21 (82)	3.82 (97)	4.47 (114)	4.85 (123)	4.09 (104)	46.89 (1,191)
Average snowfall inches (cm)	16.0 (41)	11.4 (29)	8.7 (22)	1.5 (3.8)	0.1 (0.25)	0 (0)	0 (0)	0 (0)	0 (0)	0.2 (0.51)	1.4 (3.6)	11.7 (30)	51.0 (130)
Source: Desert Research Institute

== Demographics ==
Historical population
Census	Pop.	Note	%±
1790	1,508		—
1800	1,938		28.5%
1810	2,324		19.9%
1820	2,590		11.4%
1830	2,855		10.2%
1840	2,688		−5.8%
1850	2,995		11.4%
1860	2,853		−4.7%
1870	2,546		−10.8%
1880	2,230		−12.4%
1890	2,036		−8.7%
1900	1,838		−9.7%
1910	1,675		−8.9%
1920	1,560		−6.9%
1930	1,574		0.9%
1940	1,708		8.5%
1950	2,009		17.6%
1960	2,339		16.4%
1970	3,135		34.0%
1980	5,775		84.2%
1990	6,494		12.5%
2000	7,452		14.8%
2010	8,034		7.8%
2020	8,376		4.3%

=== 2010 census ===
As of the census of 2010, there were 8,034 people, 3,108 households, and 2,254 families residing in the town. The population density was 198.3 inhabitants per square mile (76.6/km^{2}). There were 3,301 housing units at an average density of 81.5 per square mile (31.5/km^{2}). The racial makeup of the town was 96.5% White, 0.6% African American, 0.2% Native American, 0.9% Asian, 0.2% from other races, and 1.7% from two or more races. Hispanic or Latino of any race were 0.7% of the population.

There were 3,108 households, of which 32.8% had children under the age of 18 living with them, 58.5% were married couples living together, 9.4% had a female householder with no husband present, 4.6% had a male householder with no wife present, and 27.5% were non-families. Of all households, 19.1% were made up of individuals, and 6.5% had someone living alone who was 65 years of age or older. The average household size was 2.58 and the average family size was 2.94.

The median age in the town was 41.5 years. 22.7% of residents were under the age of 18; 6.7% were between the ages of 18 and 24; 26.1% were from 25 to 44; 32.6% were from 45 to 64; and 12% were 65 years of age or older. The gender makeup of the town was 50.4% male and 49.6% female.

=== 2000 census ===
As of the census of 2000, there were 7,452 people, 2,804 households, and 2,094 families residing in the town. The population density was 184.0 inhabitants per square mile (71.0/km^{2}). There were 2,930 housing units at an average density of 72.4 per square mile (28.0/km^{2}). The racial makeup of the town was 97.83% White, 0.42% African American, 0.24% Native American, 0.59% Asian, 0.12% Pacific Islander, 0.19% from other races, and 0.62% from two or more races. Hispanic or Latino of any race were 0.55% of the population.

There were 2,804 households, out of which 35.3% had children under the age of 18 living with them, 62.6% were married couples living together, 8.7% had a female householder with no husband present, and 25.3% were non-families. Of all households, 18.0% were made up of individuals, and 5.8% had someone living alone who was 65 years of age or older. The average household size was 2.65 and the average family size was 3.00.

In the town, the population was spread out, with 25.1% under the age of 18, 6.8% from 18 to 24, 33.1% from 25 to 44, 25.5% from 45 to 64, and 9.5% who were 65 years of age or older. The median age was 37 years. For every 100 females, there were 101.1 males. For every 100 females age 18 and over, there were 98.4 males.

The median income for a household in the town was $48,958, and the median income for a family was $52,845. Males had a median income of $35,628 versus $27,400 for females. The per capita income for the town was $20,179. About 3.2% of families and 6.0% of the population were below the poverty line, including 5.1% of those under age 18 and 16.5% of those age 65 or over.

== Arts and culture ==
Sites of interest include the Buxton-Hollis Historical Society and Museum, the Tory Hill Meeting House (1822), Brewster Mansion (1805), and the Powder House (1813).

== Notable people ==
- Mark Blier, state legislator
- Gibeon Bradbury, painter
- John Brewster Jr., artist
- Amos Chase, pioneer settler of Buxton
- Mark H. Dunnell, US congressman
- Alanson M. Kimball, US congressman
- Ivory Quinby, politician and businessman
- Julia Spencer-Fleming, mystery writer/author
- Ellis Baker Usher, Wisconsin politician
- Cyrus Woodman, businessman
