= Saco, Maine =

City in Maine, United States

- City
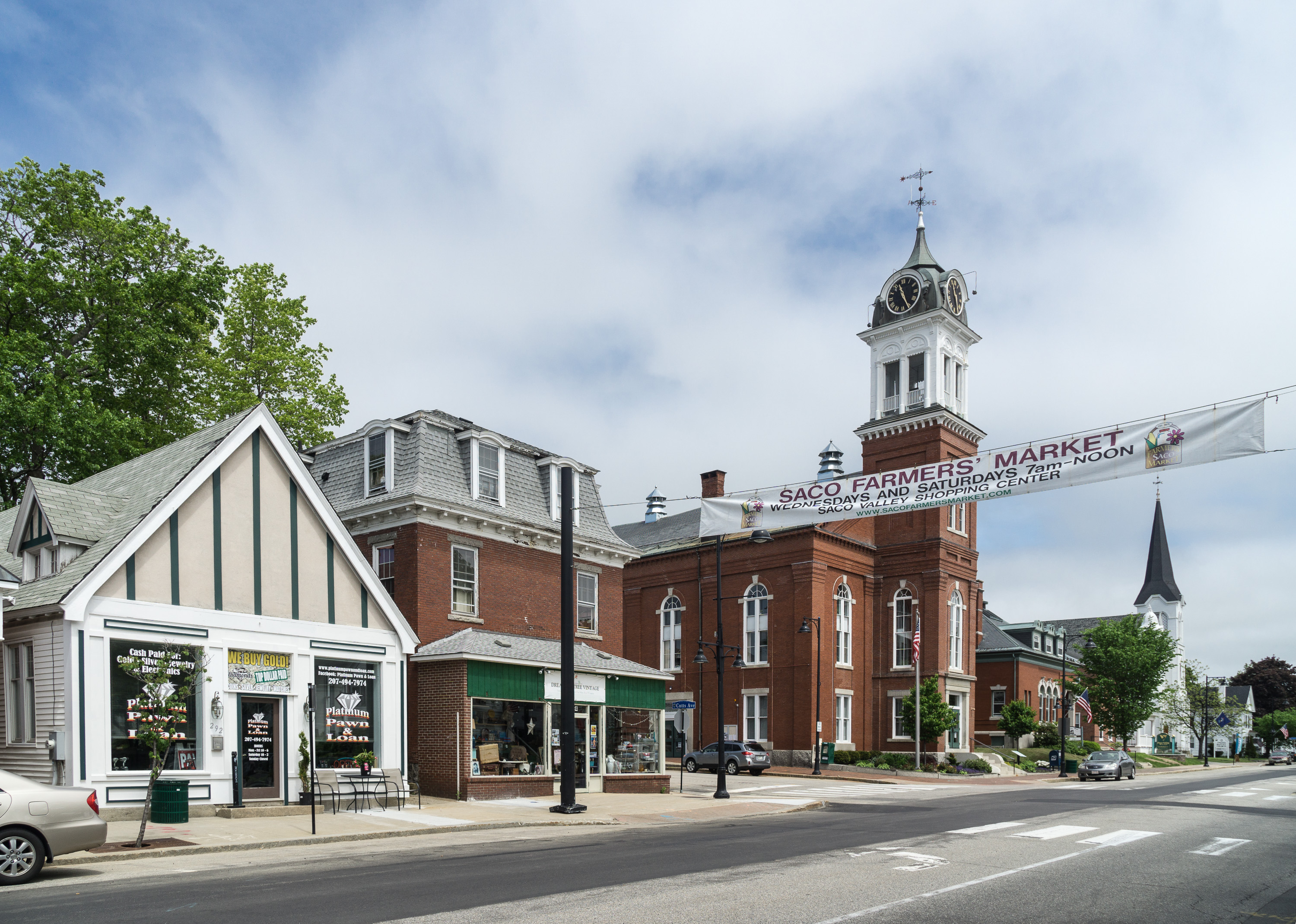
- Main Street

- Flag Seal Logo
- Motto: Domine Dirige Nos (Latin) "Lord Guide Us"
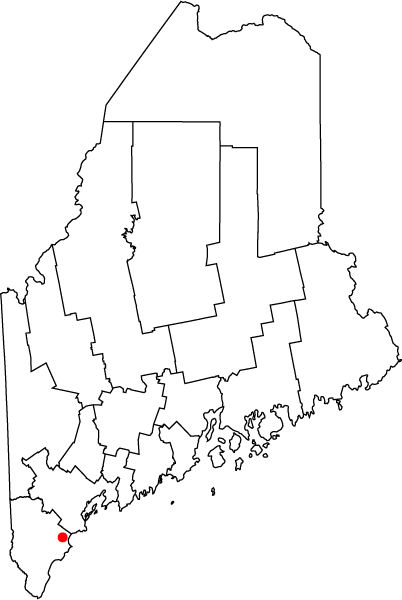
- Location of city of Saco in Maine
- Coordinates: 43°30′38″N 70°26′42″W
- Country: United States
- State: Maine
- County: York
- Incorporated (district): June 9, 1762
- Incorporated (town): August 23, 1775
- Incorporated (city): February 18, 1867

Government
  - Mayor: Jodi MacPhail

Area
  - Total: 52.83 sq mi (136.83 km^{2})
  - Land: 38.58 sq mi (99.93 km^{2})
  - Water: 14.24 sq mi (36.89 km^{2})
- Elevation: 59 ft (18 m)

Population (2020)
  - Total: 20,381
  - Density: 528.2/sq mi (203.94/km^{2})
- Time zone: UTC−5 (Eastern (EST))
  - Summer (DST): UTC−4 (EDT)
- ZIP Code: 04072
- Area code: 207
- FIPS code: 23-64675
- GNIS feature ID: 582705
- Website: www.sacomaine.org

Saco (/ˈsɑːkoʊ/ SAH-koh) is a city in York County, Maine, United States. The population was 20,381 at the 2020 census. It is home to Ferry Beach State Park, Funtown Splashtown USA, Thornton Academy and General Dynamics Armament Systems (also known by its former name, Saco Defense), a subsidiary of the defense contractor General Dynamics. Saco sees much tourism during summer months due to its amusement parks, Camp Ellis Beach and Pier, Ferry Beach State Park, and proximity to Old Orchard Beach.

Saco is part of the Portland-South Portland-Biddeford metropolitan area. Saco's twin-city is Biddeford.

== History ==
This was territory of the Abenaki tribe whose fortified village was located up the Sokokis Trail at Pequawket (now Fryeburg). There was a settlement at the mouth of the Saco river, with homes and permanent cultivation, at the time of contact with Europeans in the early 1600s.

In July 1607, 500 warriors led by sakmow (Grand Chief) of the Mi'kmaq First Nations Henri Membertou attacked the village at present-day Saco, killing 20 of their braves, including two of their leaders, Onmechin and Marchin, leading to conflict that lasted until 1615.

In 1630 the Plymouth Company granted Thomas Lewis and Richard Bonython a charter to establish a town at Saco, with a deed that extended 4 miles (6.4 km) along the sea, by 8 miles (13 km) inland. Settled in 1631 as part of Winter Harbor (as Biddeford Pool was first known). The government of Maine, under Ferdinando Gorges, was based in the town from 1636 to 1653. It would be reorganized in 1653 by the Massachusetts General Court as Saco, which would be renamed Biddeford in 1718.

The settlement was attacked by Indians in 1675 during King Philip's War. Settlers moved to the mouth of the river, and the houses and mills they left behind were burned. Saco lay in contested territory between New England and New France, which recruited the Indians as allies. In 1689 during King William's War, it was again attacked, with some residents taken captive. Hostilities intensified from 1702 until 1709, then ceased in 1713 with the Treaty of Portsmouth. The community was rebuilt and in 1718 incorporated as Biddeford. Peace would not last, however, and the town was again attacked in 1723 during Dummer's War, when it contained 14 garrisons. In August and September 1723, there were Indian raids on Saco, Maine and Dover, New Hampshire. But in 1724, a Massachusetts militia destroyed Norridgewock, an Abenaki stronghold on the Kennebec River organizing raids on English settlements. The region became less dangerous, especially after the French defeat in 1745 at the Battle of Louisburg. The French and Indian Wars finally ended with the 1763 Treaty of Paris.

In 1762, the northeastern bank of Biddeford separated as the District of Pepperrellborough, named for Sir William Pepperrell, hero of the Battle of Louisburg and late proprietor of the town. Amos Chase was one of the pioneers of Pepperrellborough. He was chosen as a selectman at the first town meeting, and served as the first deacon of the Congregational Church. Dea. Chase was one of the area's largest taxpayers, and was prominent in civic affairs during the American Revolution, serving on the town's Committee of Correspondence and Committee of Inspection.

The district was incorporated as the Town of Pepperellborough in 1775. Inhabitants found the name to be cumbersome, so in 1805 it was renamed Saco. It would be incorporated as a city in 1867. Saco became a center for lumbering, with log drives down the river from Little Falls Plantation (now Dayton, Lyman, Hollis and part of Limington). At Saco Falls, the timber was cut by 17 sawmills. In 1827, the community produced 21,000,000 feet (6,400,000 m) of sawn lumber, some of which was used for shipbuilding.

On Factory Island, the Saco Iron Works began operation in 1811. The Saco Manufacturing Company established a cotton mill in 1826, and a canal was dug through rock to provide water power. The mill burned in 1830, but was replaced in 1831 by the York Manufacturing Company. With the arrival of the Portland, Saco and Portsmouth Railroad in 1842, Factory Island developed into a major textile manufacturing center, with extensive brick mills dominating the Saco and Biddeford waterfronts. Other businesses included foundries, belting and harnessmaking, and machine shops. But the New England textile industry faded in the 20th century, and the York Manufacturing Company would close in 1958. The prosperous mill town era, however, left behind much fine architecture in the Georgian, Federal, Greek Revival and Victorian styles. Many buildings are now listed on the National Register of Historic Places.

In 1844, Laurel Hill Cemetery was established on 25-acre (10 ha) of land. Still in operation, it is one of the earliest examples of the Rural cemetery movement.

Saco has taken steps to make the city more environmentally friendly. In early 2007 a small wind turbine was erected near the water treatment plant at the foot of Front street. Another larger wind turbine was erected on the top of York Hill in December 2007, and was expected to generate power for the new train station for Amtrak's Downeaster, although this was torn down in 2018 as the wind turbine never came close to generating the amount of energy promised. Saco also has two growing business parks.

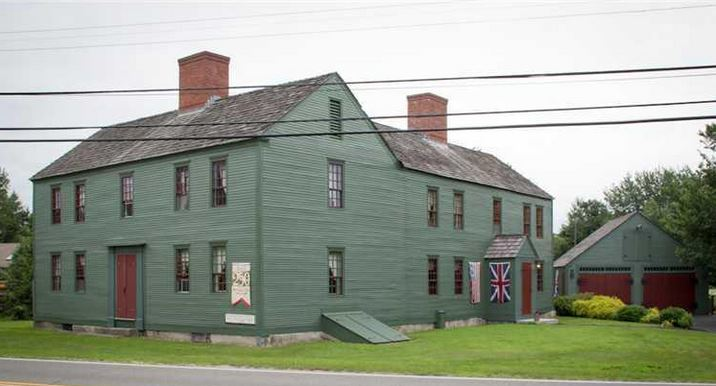
Amos Chase house on Ferry Road; built c. 1743

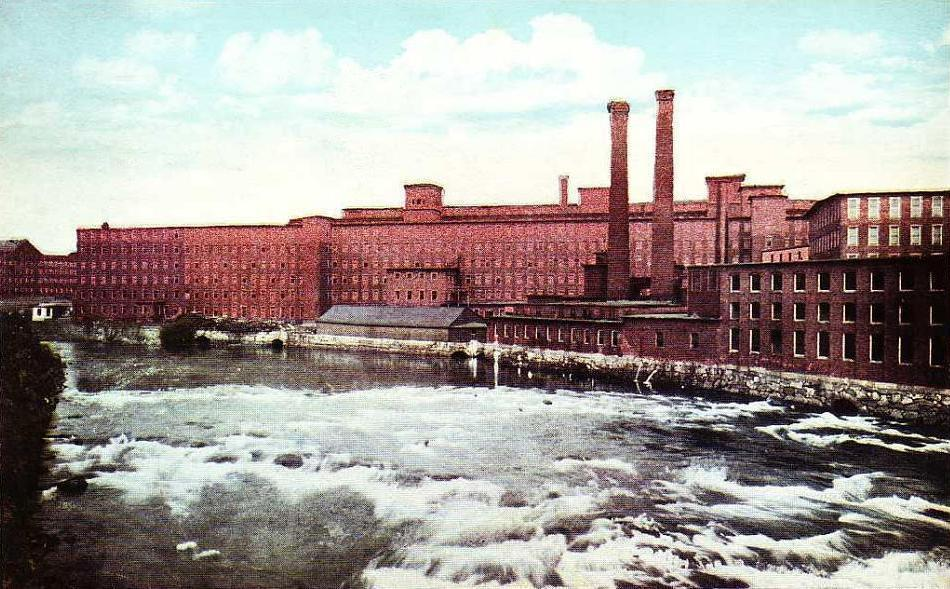
York Manufacturing Co. in 1916

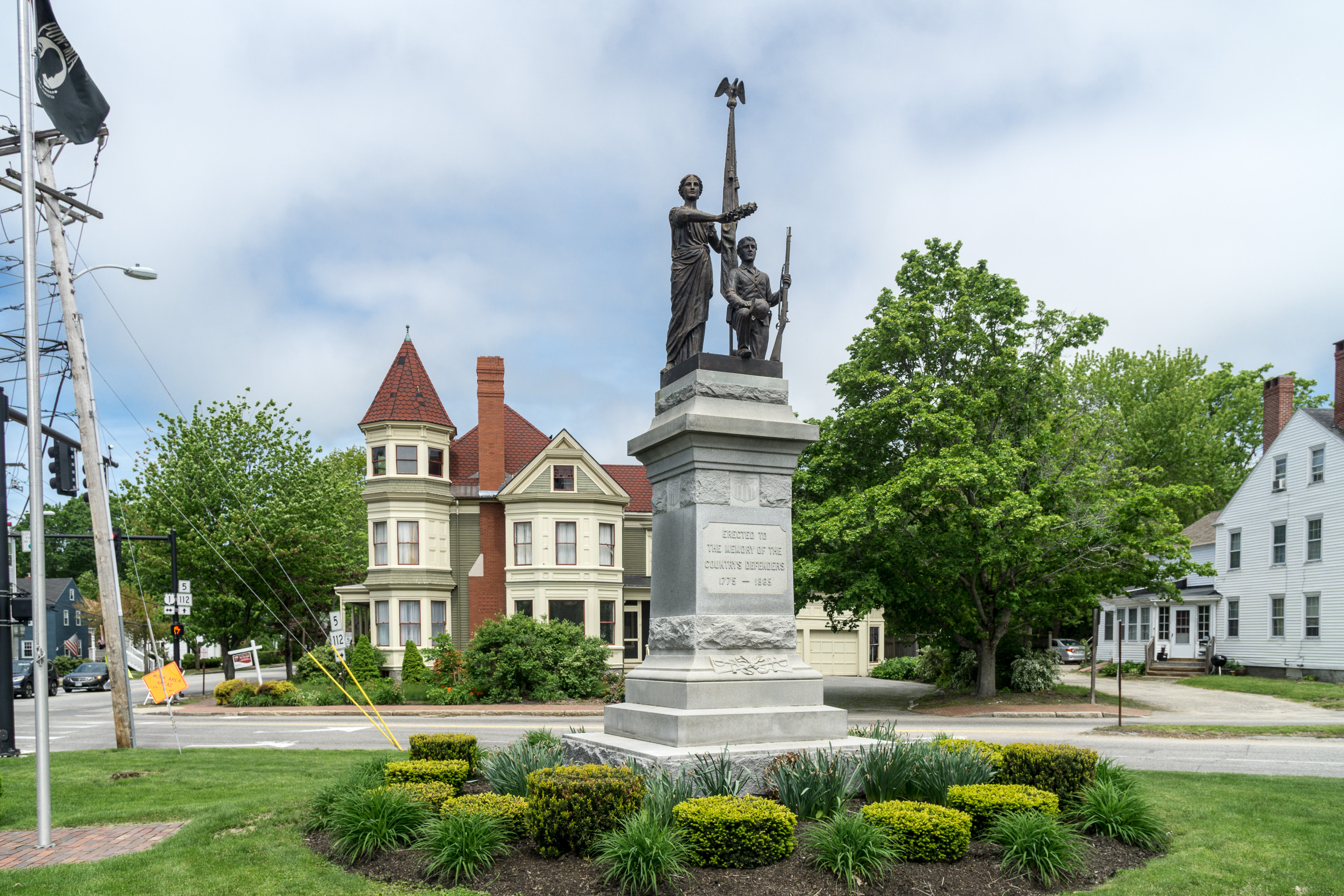
Civil War memorial in Eastman Park

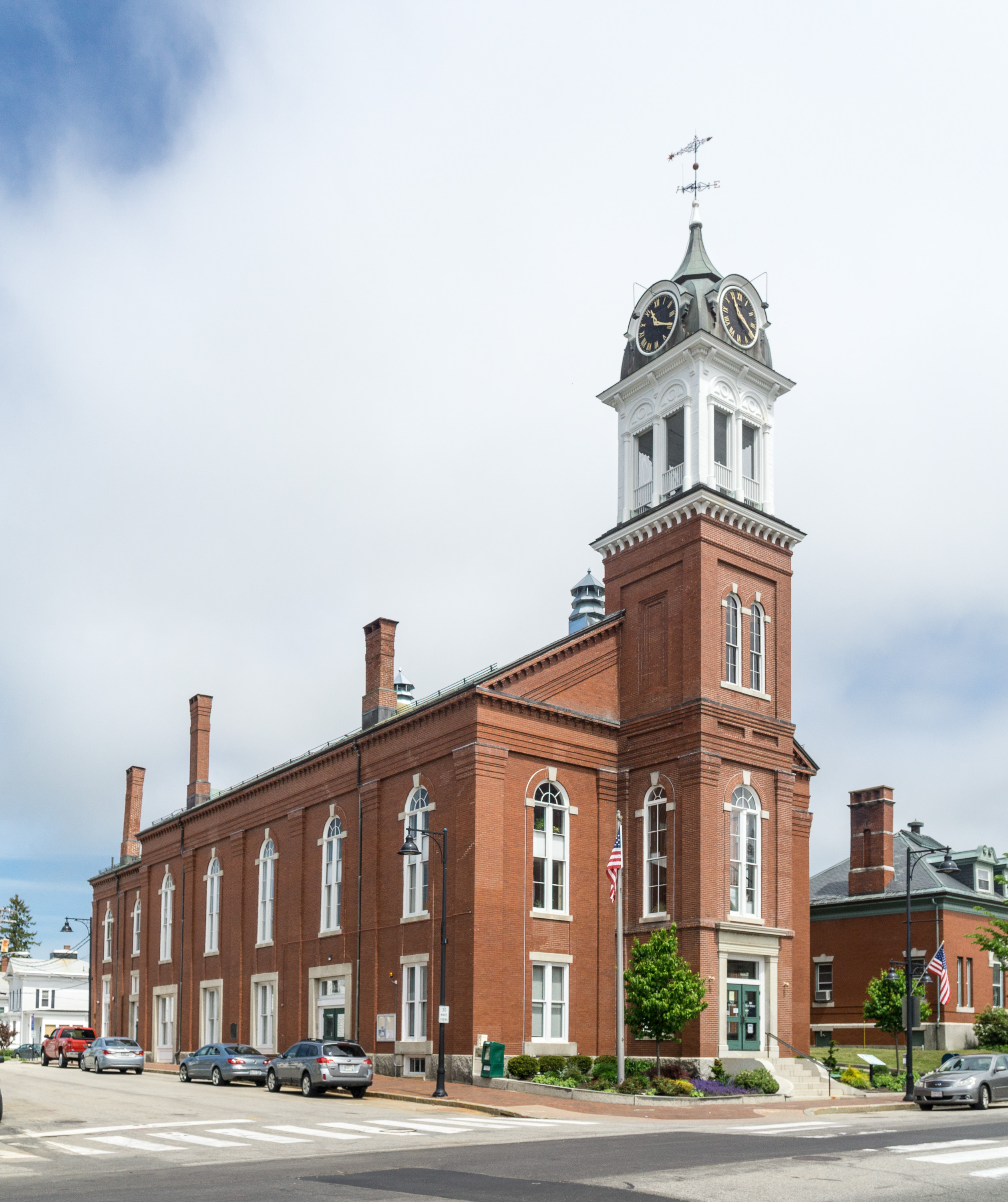
Saco City Hall

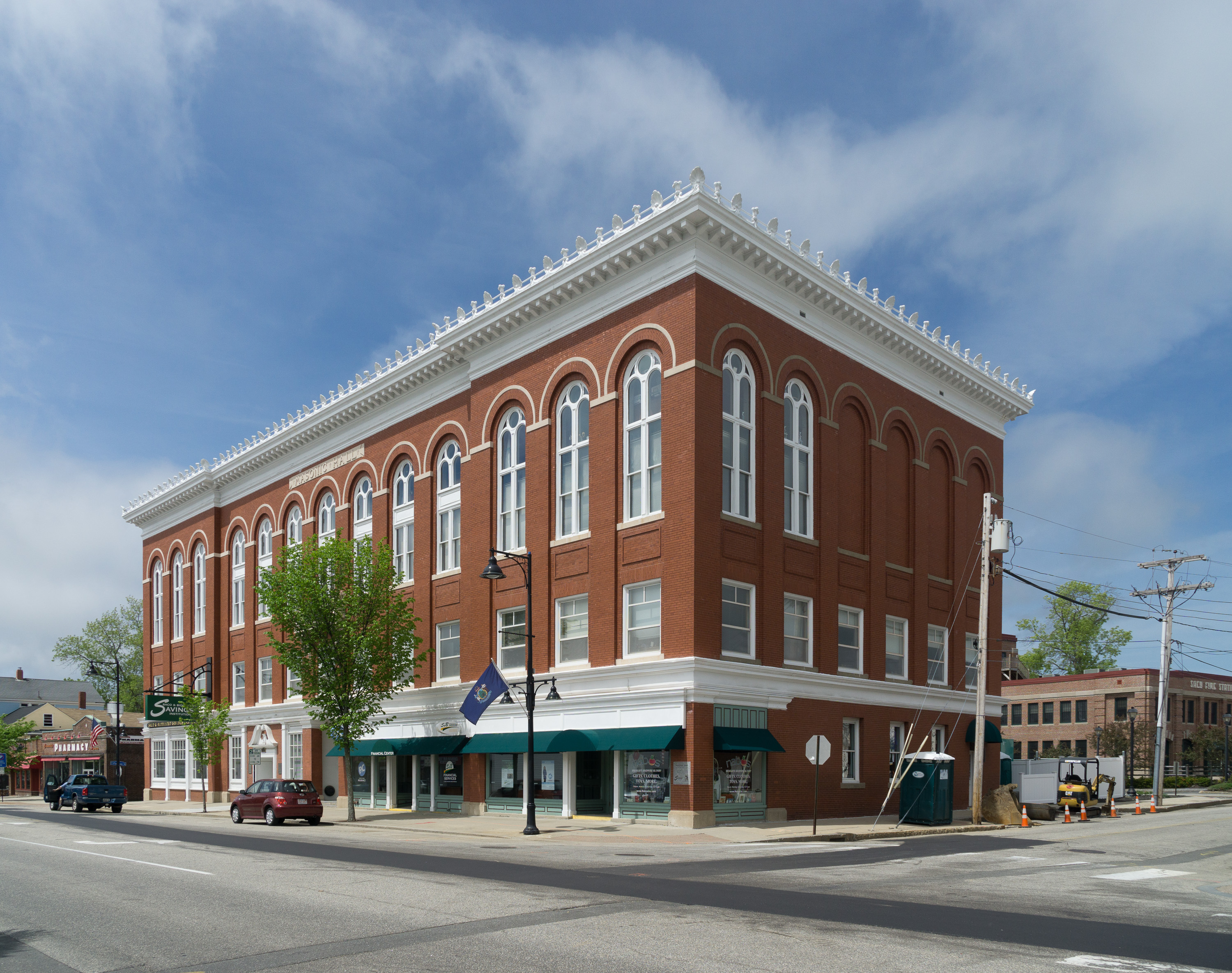
Masonic Hall

== Geography ==
According to the United States Census Bureau, the city has a total area of 52.76 square miles (136.65 km^{2}), of which 38.46 square miles (99.61 km^{2}) is land and 14.30 square miles (37.04 km^{2}) is water. Situated beside Saco Bay on the Gulf of Maine, Saco is drained by the Saco River.

Saco borders the city of Biddeford, as well as the towns of Scarborough, Buxton, Dayton and Old Orchard Beach.

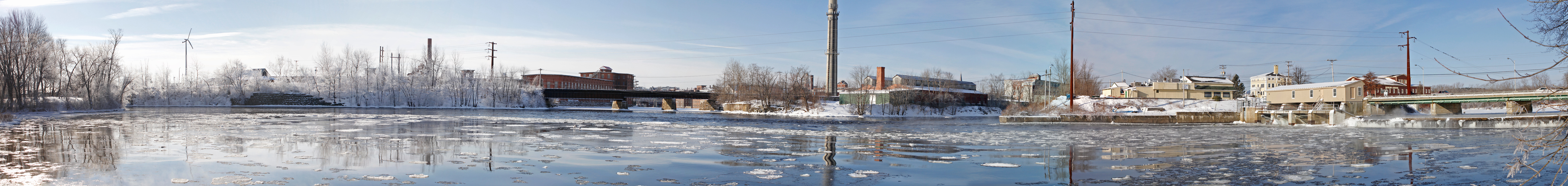
The Saco River as seen from Water Street in Saco. To the right is Rt 1 (Elm St) crossing the river to Spring's Island in Biddeford. In the middle is the railroad bridge that serves the Amtrak Downeaster and freight trains. It crosses from Biddeford to Saco's Factory Island.

=== Terrain ===
Saco contains a wide variety of landforms, including beaches, fields, forests, bogs, and urban areas. The beachfront Camp Ellis section of the city has been eroding since the Army Corps of Engineers built a jetty in the 1860s at the mouth of the Saco River that stopped sediment from feeding the Camp Ellis beaches. This has been exacerbated by rising sea levels and climate change in Maine.

This is an archive of documents related to erosion issues in the Camp Ellis section of Saco.

== Demographics ==
Historical population
Census	Pop.	Note	%±
1790	1,350		—
1800	1,842		36.4%
1810	2,492		35.3%
1820	2,532		1.6%
1830	3,219		27.1%
1840	4,408		36.9%
1850	5,798		31.5%
1860	6,223		7.3%
1870	5,755		−7.5%
1880	6,389		11.0%
1890	6,075		−4.9%
1900	6,122		0.8%
1910	6,583		7.5%
1920	6,817		3.6%
1930	7,233		6.1%
1940	8,631		19.3%
1950	10,324		19.6%
1960	10,515		1.9%
1970	11,678		11.1%
1980	12,921		10.6%
1990	15,181		17.5%
2000	16,822		10.8%
2010	18,482		9.9%
2020	20,381		10.3%

=== 2020 census ===
As of the 2020 census, Saco had a population of 20,381. The median age was 42.9 years. 18.6% of residents were under the age of 18 and 18.3% of residents were 65 years of age or older. For every 100 females there were 92.1 males, and for every 100 females age 18 and over there were 89.8 males age 18 and over.

75.3% of residents lived in urban areas, while 24.7% lived in rural areas.

There were 8,596 households in Saco, of which 26.2% had children under the age of 18 living in them. Of all households, 47.0% were married-couple households, 16.8% were households with a male householder and no spouse or partner present, and 27.2% were households with a female householder and no spouse or partner present. About 28.9% of all households were made up of individuals and 11.4% had someone living alone who was 65 years of age or older.

There were 9,486 housing units, of which 9.4% were vacant. The homeowner vacancy rate was 0.9% and the rental vacancy rate was 7.0%.

Racial composition as of the 2020 census
Race	Number	Percent
White	18,461	90.6%
Black or African American	337	1.7%
American Indian and Alaska Native	45	0.2%
Asian	368	1.8%
Native Hawaiian and Other Pacific Islander	2	0.0%
Some other race	174	0.9%
Two or more races	994	4.9%
Hispanic or Latino (of any race)	445	2.2%

=== 2010 census ===
As of the census of 2010, there were 18,482 people, 7,623 households, and 4,925 families residing in the city. The population density was 480.6 inhabitants per square mile (185.6/km^{2}). There were 8,508 housing units at an average density of 221.2 per square mile (85.4/km^{2}). The racial makeup of the city was 95.7% White, 0.7% African American, 0.2% Native American, 1.7% Asian, 0.3% from other races, and 1.4% from two or more races. Hispanic or Latino of any race were 1.3% of the population.

There were 7,623 households, of which 28.5% had children under the age of 18 living with them, 49.2% were married couples living together, 10.7% had a female householder with no husband present, 4.7% had a male householder with no wife present, and 35.4% were non-families. 27.0% of all households were made up of individuals, and 10% had someone living alone who was 65 years of age or older. The average household size was 2.38 and the average family size was 2.88.

The median age in the city was 41.9 years. 21.9% of residents were under the age of 18; 7.6% were between the ages of 18 and 24; 25.6% were from 25 to 44; 30.5% were from 45 to 64; and 14.3% were 65 years of age or older. The gender makeup of the city was 48.3% male and 51.7% female.

=== 2000 census ===
As of the census of 2000, there were 16,822 people, 6,801 households, and 4,590 families residing in the city. The population density was 437.2 inhabitants per square mile (168.8/km^{2}). There were 7,424 housing units at an average density of 193.0 per square mile (74.5/km^{2}). The racial makeup of the city was 97.91% White, 0.32% African American, 0.15% Native American, 0.51% Asian, 0.09% Pacific Islander, 0.10% from other races, and 0.93% from two or more races. Hispanic or Latino of any race were 0.58% of the population.

There were 6,801 households, out of which 33.1% had children under the age of 18 living with them, 53.3% were married couples living together, 10.6% had a female householder with no husband present, and 32.5% were non-families. 25.2% of all households were made up of individuals, and 10.1% had someone living alone who was 65 years of age or older. The average household size was 2.44 and the average family size was 2.93.

In the city, the population was spread out, with 25.0% under the age of 18, 6.8% from 18 to 24, 32.1% from 25 to 44, 22.2% from 45 to 64, and 13.9% who were 65 years of age or older. The median age was 37 years. For every 100 females, there were 91.0 males. For every 100 females age 18 and over, there were 87.7 males.

The median income for a household in the city was $45,105, and the median income for a family was $52,724. Males had a median income of $35,446 versus $25,585 for females. The per capita income for the city was $20,444. About 7.1% of families and 8.2% of the population were below the poverty line, including 9.4% of those under age 18 and 10.8% of those age 65 or over.

== Government and politics ==
Saco is divided into 7 voting wards, represented by: Ward 1 Councilor Douglas Edwards, Ward 2 Councilor Joshua Parks, Ward 3 Councilor Joseph Gunn, Ward 4 Councilor Michael Burman, Ward 5 Councilor Phil Hatch, Ward 6 Councilor Tricia Huot, and Ward 7 Councilor Nathan Johnston. On November 7, 2023, Saco Elected former city councilor Jodi MacPhail as its first female Mayor. Mayor MacPhail was sworn in at a historic inauguration ceremony held on December 4, 2023, at Saco City Hall.

Voter registration

Voter Registration and Party Enrollment as of March 2020
Party	Total Voters	Percentage
Democratic	6,513	41.46%
Unenrolled	4,994	31.79%
Republican	3,627	23.09%
Green Independent	574	3.65%
Total	15,708	100%

== Education ==
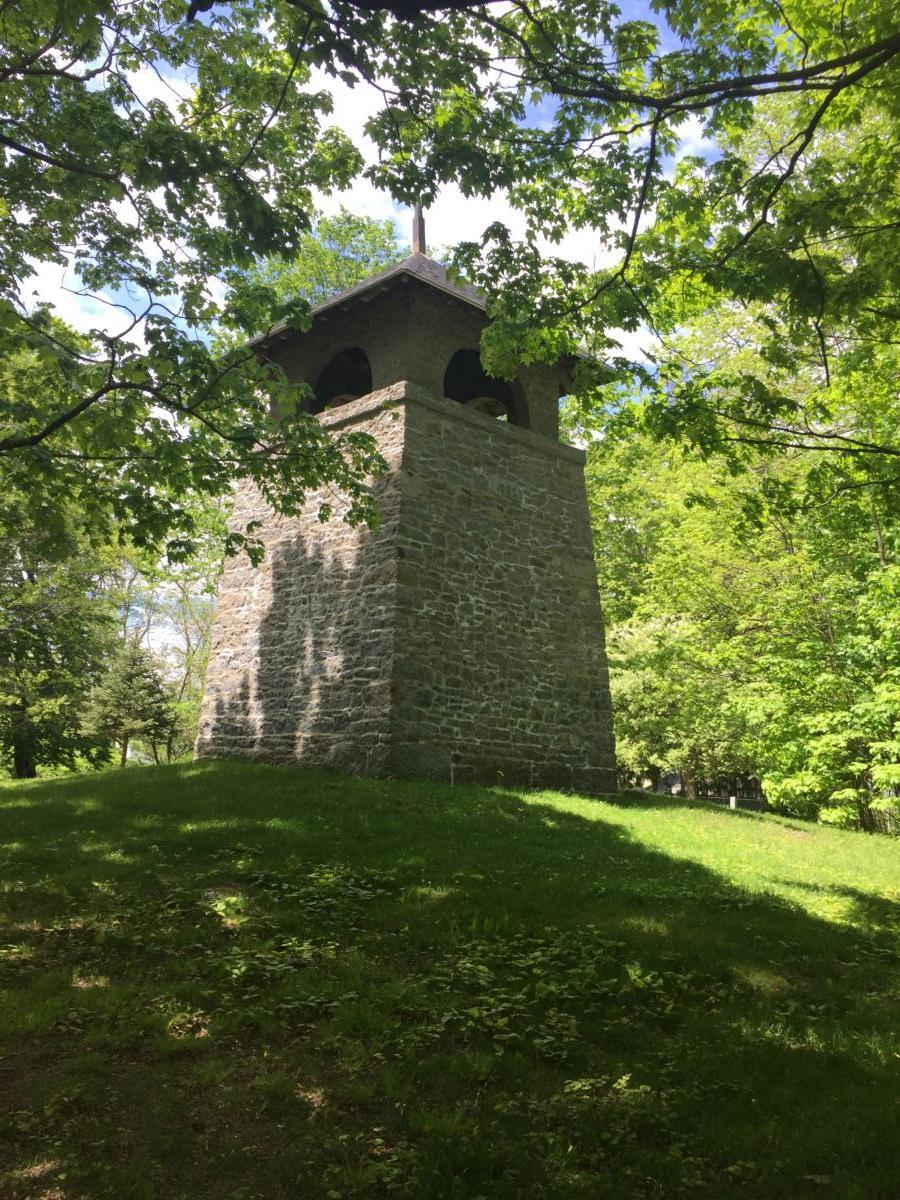
The stone water tower in Pepperell Park, Saco, Maine was constructed in 1887 in order to irrigate Pepperell Park.

=== List of schools ===
- Governor John Fairfield School (K–2)
- Young School (K–2)
- C.K. Burns School (3–5)
- Saco Middle School (6–8)
- Thornton Academy (9–12)

=== Previous schools ===
- Notre Dame de Lourdes School (K–8) – Closed in 2009 due to budget constraints and lack of students.

=== Higher education ===
- University College has a campus located in Saco.

== Infrastructure ==
=== Transportation ===
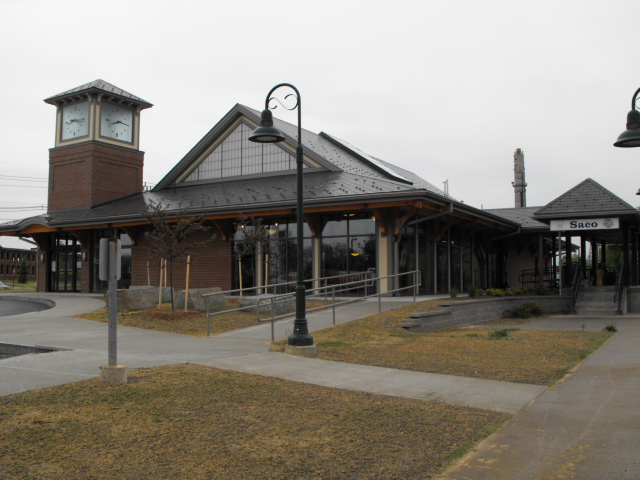
Saco Transportation Center

The Saco Transportation Center provides transportation between Portland and Boston via the Downeaster passenger train.

Saco is accessible from Interstate 95, U.S. Route 1 and Interstate 195. State routes 5, 9, 112, and 117 also serve the city. Taxis serve the Tri-City Area (Saco, Biddeford, and Old Orchard Beach).

The Portland International Jetport is about 14 miles (23 km) north of Saco. The ShuttleBus and Zoom Bus provide local transportation.

== Environmental contamination ==
Since 1960, the City of Saco has owned and operated the Saco Municipal Landfill . The site consists of four distinct disposal areas, the fourth of which is a recently closed landfill that accepted household waste and tannery sludge containing chromium and other heavy metals, as well as volatile organic compounds. In February 1990 the site was placed on the National Priorities List. From 1992 to 1994, EPA studied the groundwater contamination. in September 1996, EPA started capping the landfill. In 2000, institutional controls were established, which restrict site uses.

== Notable people ==
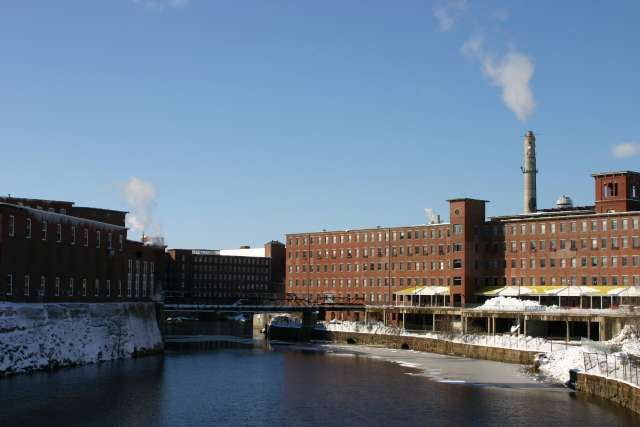
The Saco and Biddeford mills today

- Henry A. Barrows, actor
- Liberty Billings, Florida senator
- Samuel Brannan, businessman and pioneer
- Amos Chase, Saco pioneer
- Justin Chenette, Maine state representative
- Richard Cutts, U.S. congressman
- Arthur P. Fairfield, naval officer
- John Fairfield, U.S. congressman and senator; 16th governor of Maine
- Rory Ferreira, musician better known as Milo
- George Lincoln Goodale, botanist
- Charles Henry Granger, painter
- Elizabeth Deering Hanscom, English professor
- Bryan Kaenrath, Maine state representative
- Cyrus King, U.S. congressman
- Slugger Labbe, crew chief with NASCAR
- James Felix McKenney, actor
- Isaac Lawrence Milliken, 16th mayor of Chicago
- Edith Nourse Rogers, U.S. congresswoman
- Emery J. San Souci, 53rd governor of Rhode Island
- John Fairfield Scammon, U.S. congressman
- Ether Shepley, Maine state congressman, U.S. senator and jurist
- George F. Shepley, general in the Union Army and 18th governor of Louisiana
- John Wingate Thornton, lawyer, historian, and author

== Sites of interest ==
- Dyer Library
- Funtown Splashtown USA
- Saco Heath Preserve
- Ferry Beach State Park
