= West Scarborough =

Coordinates: 43°36′18.5″N 70°27′2.8″W

West Scarborough is an area within the northwesternmost portion of the town of Scarborough, Maine.

While the area of town around Dunstan Corner was once known as "West Scarborough" because of the station of that name on the Eastern Railroad, the term now refers to an area that is roughly defined as west of the Maine Turnpike and U.S. Route 1, west of Dunstan Corner, and southwest of North Scarborough. It is the most rural part of Scarborough, with comparatively the lowest amount of residential and business development; however, recent years have seen a strong increase in residential construction and population. It is closely linked with the adjacent neighborhood of North Scarborough - in local perception, the two neighborhoods are often mutually inclusive.

It borders Scarborough's neighboring towns of Gorham, Buxton, as well as the city of Saco, and is closer in distance to the downtown core of Gorham than Scarborough's downtown core, Oak Hill. The area is approximately 10 miles (16 km) from downtown Portland via Maine State Route 22. The area was once made up of many small farms, and today a few horse farms are still in operation. It remains heavily forested. Its major roads include parts of Broadturn Road, Holmes Road, Burnham Road, Beech Ridge Road, Mitchell Hill Road and County Road (ME 22).

The Nonesuch River runs through a large part of West Scarborough, and Mitchell Hill is its steepest incline. Fuller Farm, a 220-acre (0.89 km^{2}) property now conserved and managed by the Scarborough Land Trust, is a former family-owned farm that has miles of scenic trails and access to the Nonesuch River.
