= Nonesuch River Golf Course =

Golf course in Maine, US

Coordinates: 43°37′15″N 70°22′5″W

Nonesuch River Golf Course is an 18-hole golf course located near the Nonesuch River in Scarborough, Maine, United States. Designed primarily by Tom Walker of the United States Golf Association, Nonesuch was opened to the public in 1997.
