= Scarborough Marsh =

Saltwater marsh in Maine, United States

Coordinates: 43°33′3″N 70°20′1″W

Scarborough Marsh is a 3,200-acre saltwater marsh owned by the state of Maine and managed by the state's Department of Inland Fisheries and Wildlife as a wildlife management area. It is situated in southern Maine, in the town of Scarborough, in Cumberland County.

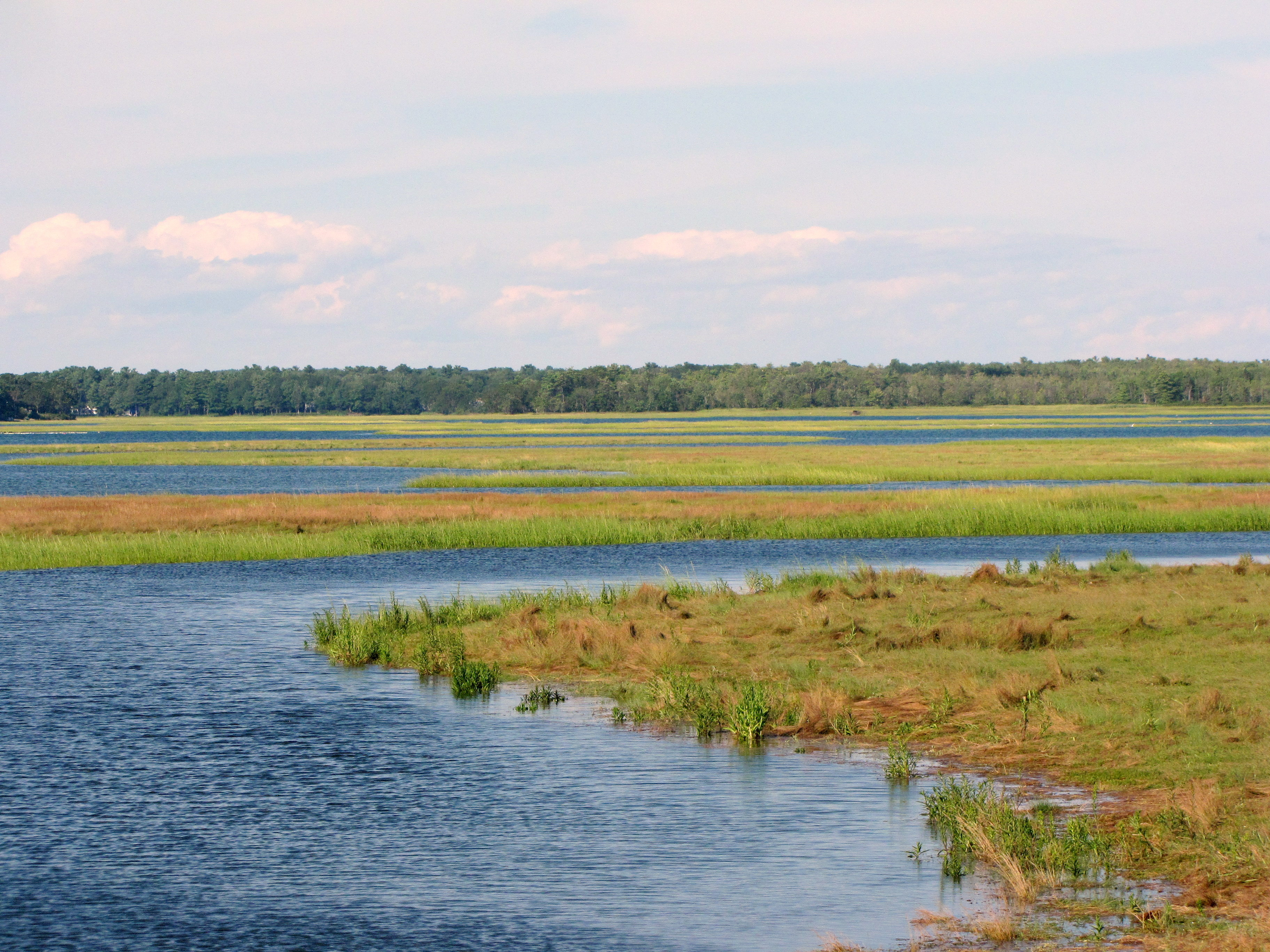
Scarborough Marsh

== About ==
The marsh is fed by four rivers and several creeks. Three of the rivers in the Scarborough Marsh feed into and create the Scarborough River, which flows into Saco Bay and the Gulf of Maine.

The main waterways in the marsh are the Libby River, Nonesuch River, Dunstan River, Scarborough River, Jones Creek, Mill Brook, Phillips Brook, Finnerd Brook, and Cascade Brook. There are many other minor creeks that feed the main waterways.

Salt marshes filter pollution from the water and provide food and shelter for numerous species of birds, fish, mammals, and shellfish. Given the wildlife productivity and habitat diversity in this area, Scarborough Marsh is considered by the state of Maine as the most significant of Maine's coastal Focus Areas. It is the largest salt marsh in the state.

Before the marsh was protected by the state ownership, there was considerable construction on some of the higher lands in and around the marsh, which stretches from Old Orchard Beach, south of Scarborough, nearly to Cape Elizabeth, to the town's north.

The acreage of the Scarborough Marsh Wildlife Management Area continues to grow as a result of organizations such as the Friends of Scarborough Marsh and the Scarborough Land Trust and the town of Scarborough, buying or taking donated ownership of privately held land within or bordering the marshland.

U.S. Route 1 cuts through a section of the marsh in what was formerly referred to as the Dunstan Corner section of the town.

There are two commercial oyster farms and hundreds of commercial and recreational clammers operating in the marsh. Commercial lobstermen dock their boats in one of the rivers. The town provides a limited number of recreational boat tie-ups.

== Ecology ==
The marsh is a stopover on the Atlantic Flyway, so a myriad of waterfowl can be spotted on the way to Canada in the spring and south to their wintering areas in the fall. Seals or an occasional porpoise on the hunt for food can be seen in the Scarborough River.

The majority of Scarborough Marsh, Maine's largest saltwater marsh complex, has been negatively impacted by man-made ditches, which have been used to drain the marsh, lowering the natural water table and reducing the number of permanent pools on the high marsh. Since early 2000, with the creation of the Friends of Scarborough Marsh, hundreds of acres of open water habitat have been restored by plugging existing ditches and re-creating pools. The new permanent pools on the high marsh again became home for cordgrass, aquatic invertebrates, mosquito-eating saltmarsh fish and waterbirds including black ducks and glossy ibis.

This is the first of many saltmarsh restoration projects to be completed by the Friends of Scarborough Marsh and its partners including Ducks Unlimited Inc., Maine's Department of Inland Fisheries & Wildlife, U.S. Fish and Wildlife Service and Maine Audubon Society.

== History ==
In the past, it was believed that by draining marshes, mosquitoes could be eliminated, when, in fact, the opposite occurred. By draining marshes, the aquatic life that consumed mosquitoes disappeared.

Additionally, in the 1800s, settlers created the ditches that redirected water flow so that they could maximize the farming of salt grasses.

Abenaki Indians called the marsh Owascoag, meaning "a place of much grass." In 1658, the Massachusetts General Court incorporated all the villages around the marsh as one town and renamed them Scarborough, after the city in Yorkshire, England. At that time, Maine was part of Massachusetts.

== Recreation areas ==
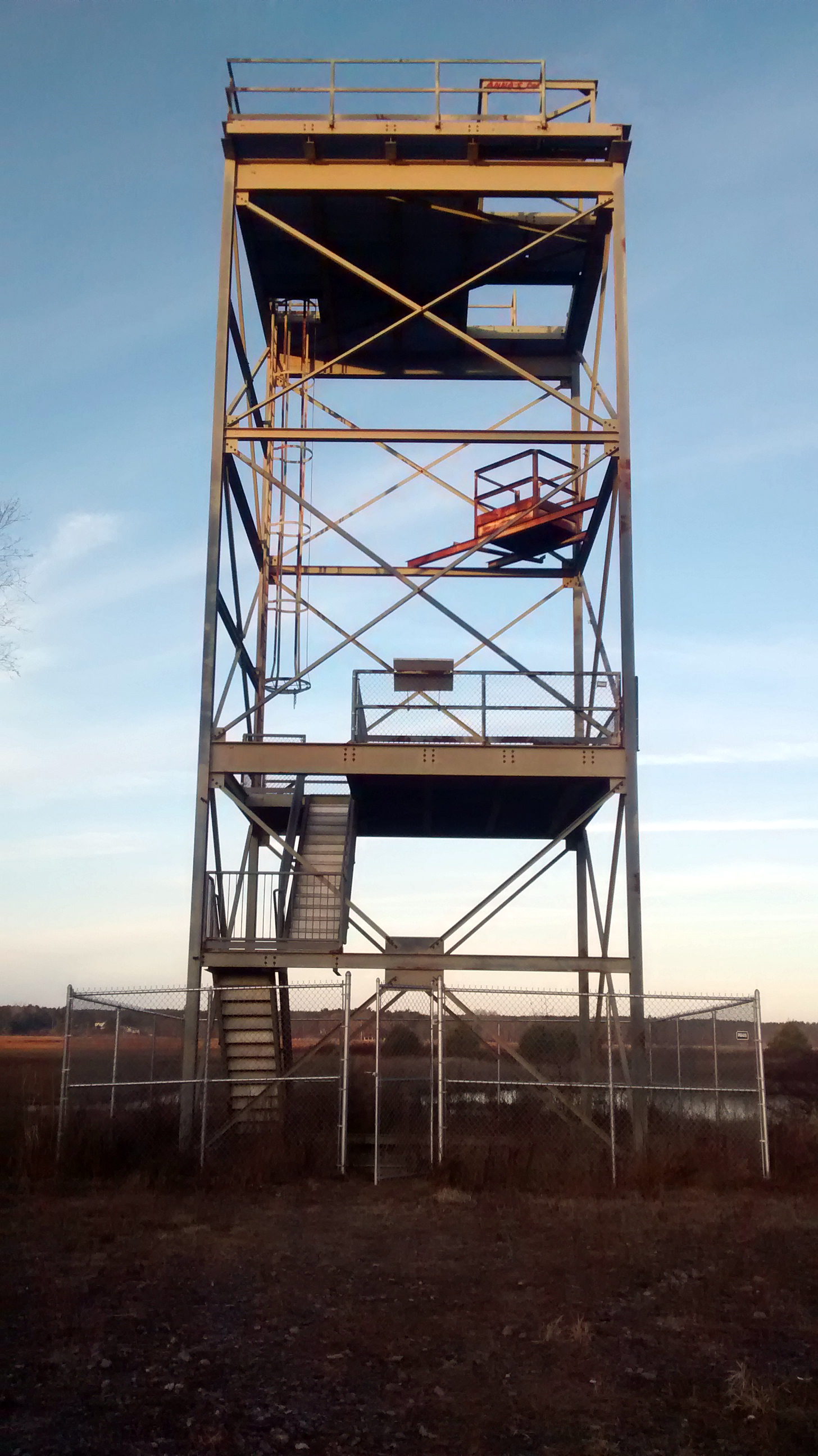
Scarborough Marsh observation tower

The town's Pine Point Beach, Western Beach and Ferry Beach abut the marsh with frontage on Saco Bay.

The Eastern Trail, on right-of-way of the former Portland, Saco & Portsmouth Railroad, provides a path for walking, biking, cross-country skiing and bird watching. The Eastern Trail is the southern Maine section of the East Coast Greenway.

The town marina, on King Street at the end of Pine Point, provides a place for boaters to put in their water craft, with the marsh on the northwest and Saco Bay on the southeast. The town's harbor master has an office just off the marina. On the opposite side of the Scarborough River is another launch ramp for boaters. It is accessed through the Ferry Beach parking lot. A gravel launch into the Nonesuch River is at the end of Winnocks Neck.

Maine Audubon operates a nature center on Pine Point Road and provides canoes for use on the Dunstan and Scarborough rivers.

In the marsh itself, many species of fish feed in the rivers and, consequently, many fishermen can be found there. Hunting is permitted, as well.

An observation tower is a short walk from the IF&W-maintained parking area off Manson Libby Road. The tower, a former cell tower on what was until recently land owned by the Gervais family, provides a view of the Dunstan River weaving through marshland.

== Gallery ==
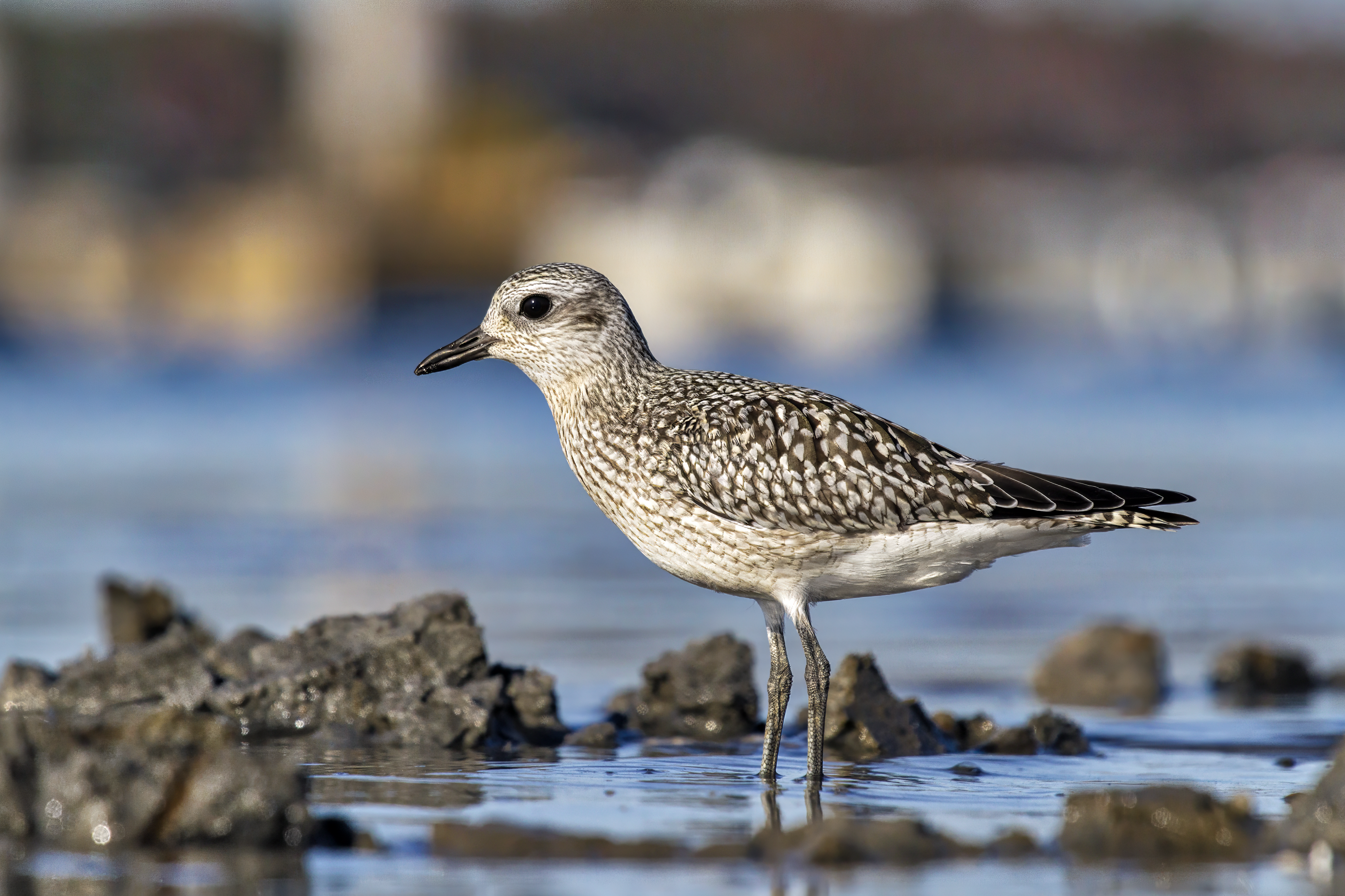
Black-Bellied Plover in non-breeding plumage.

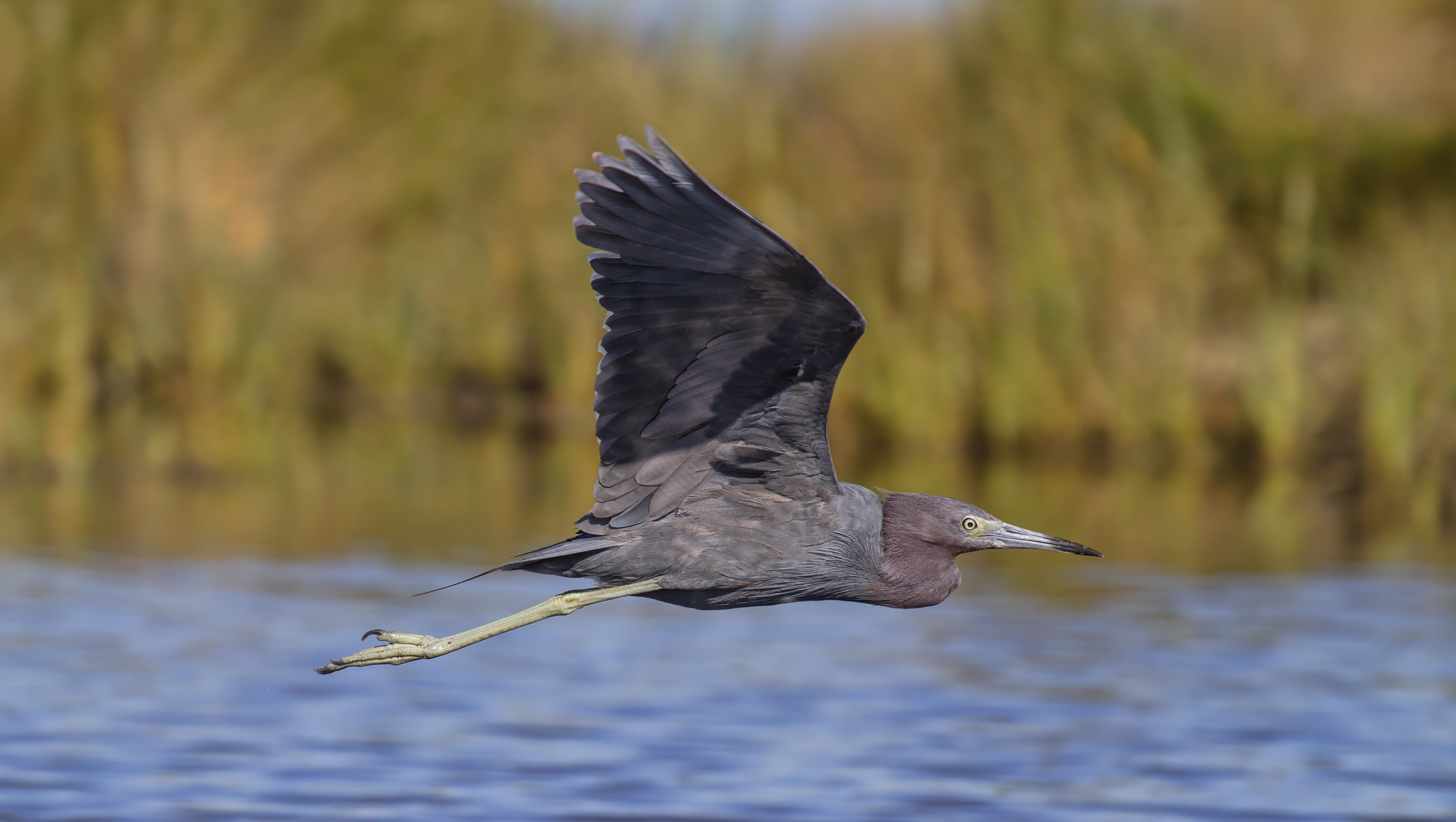
A Little Blue Heron flies over the Nonesuch River.

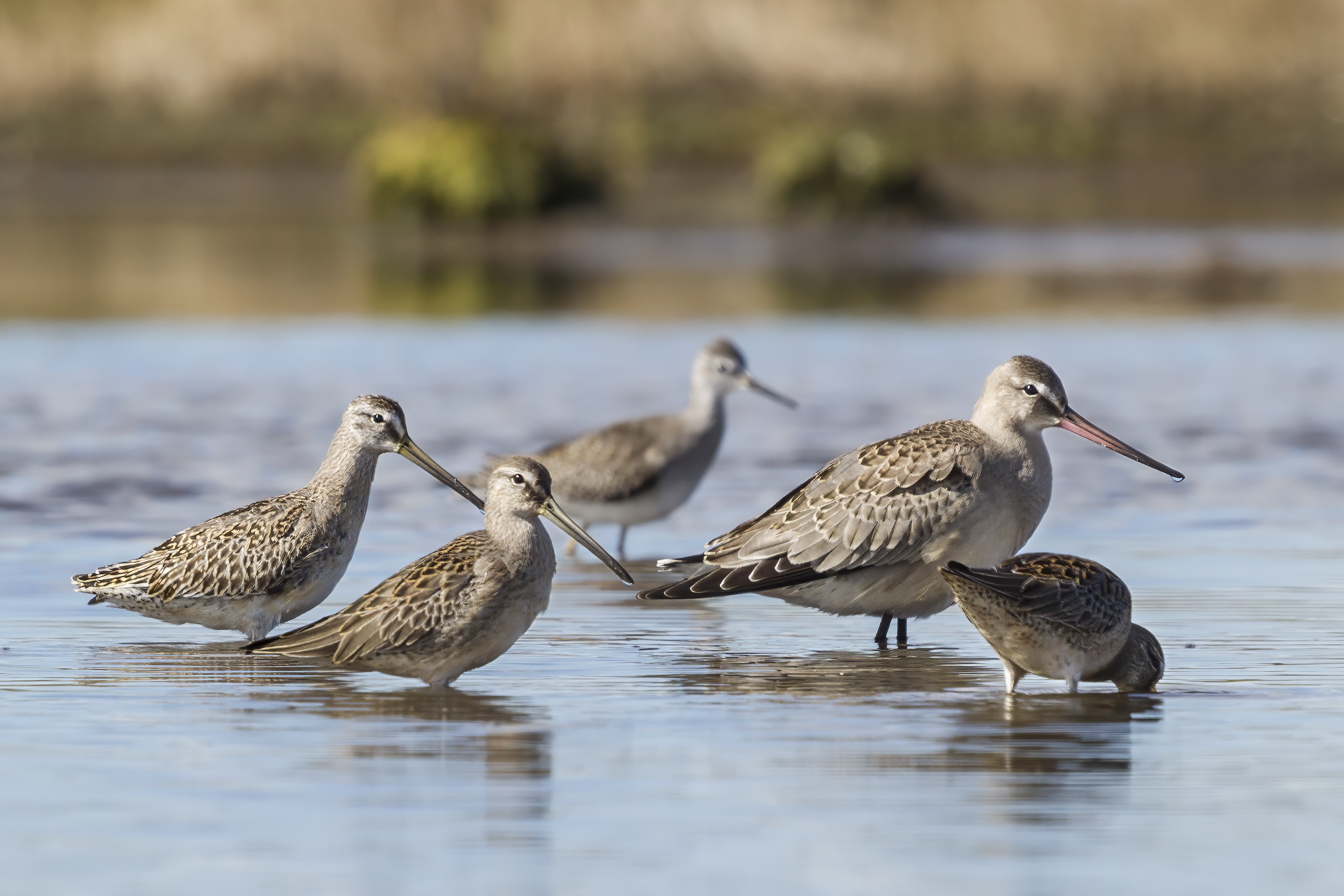
A Long-billed Dowitcher, two Short-billed Dowitchers, a Hudsonian Godwit and a Stilt Sandpiper in the high marsh.

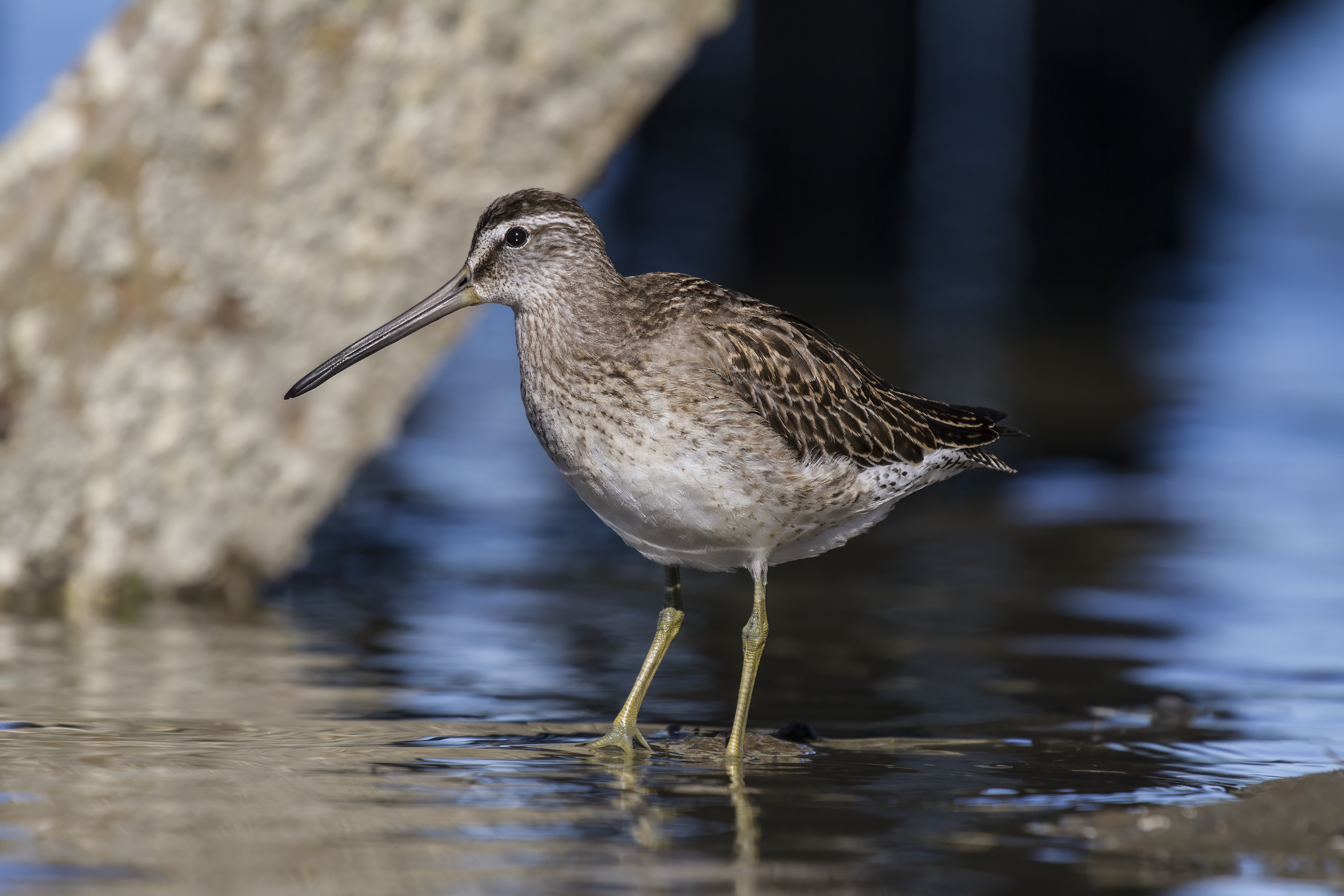
A Short-billed Dowitcher in the Nonesuch River.

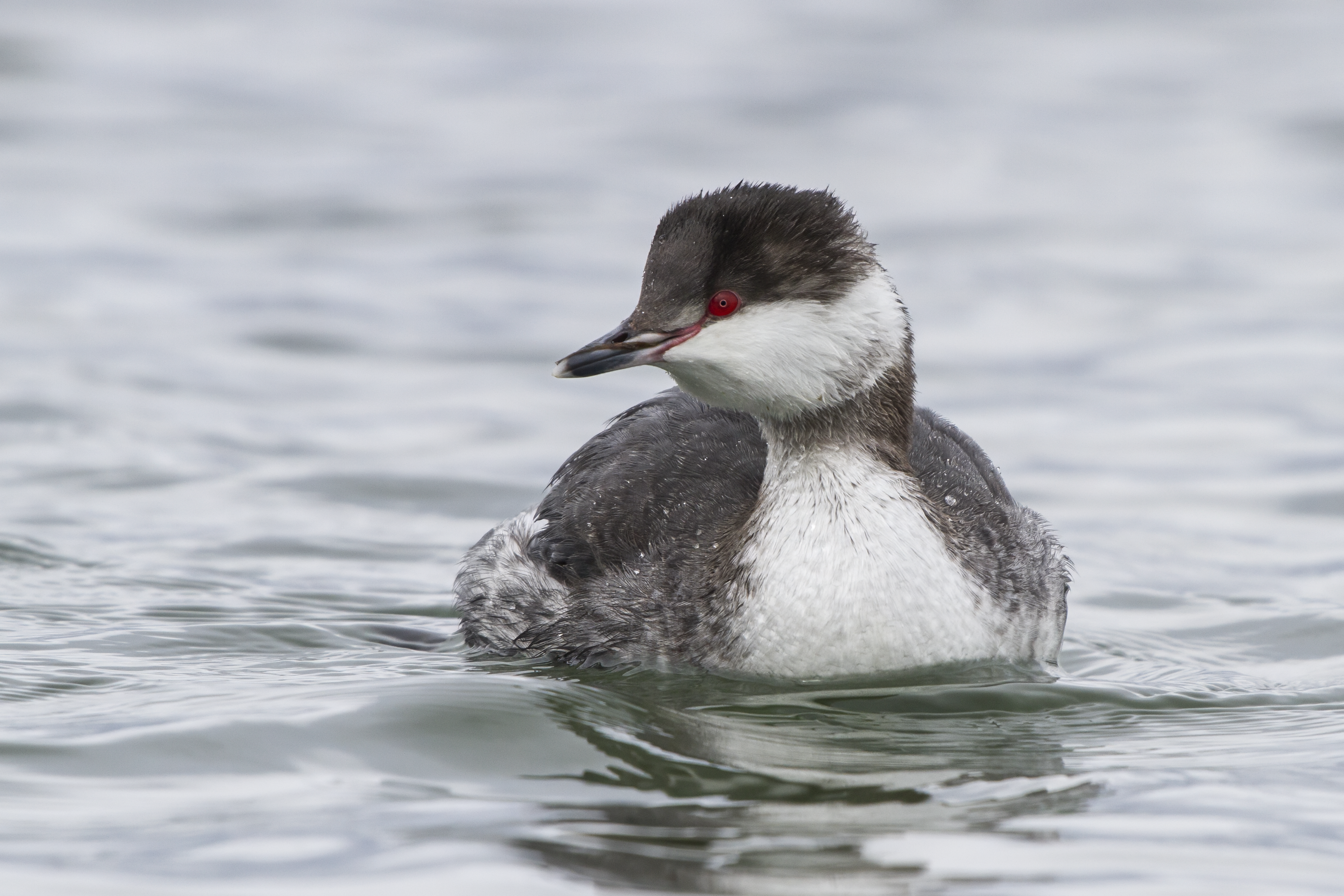
A Horned Grebe in winter, in the Nonesuch River.

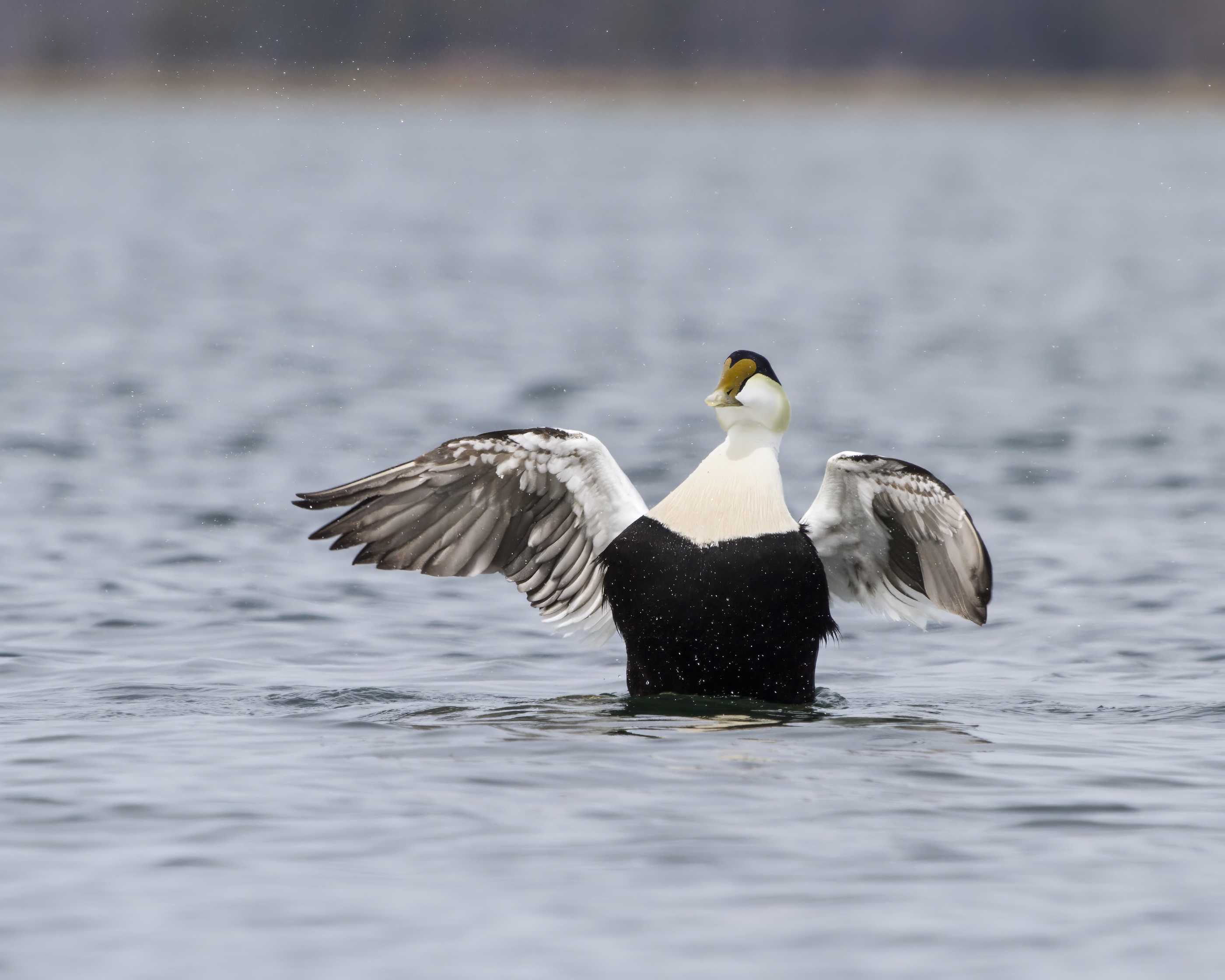
Rafts of Common Eiders are not uncommon in winter.
