= Winford Henry Smith =

American physician (1877–1961)

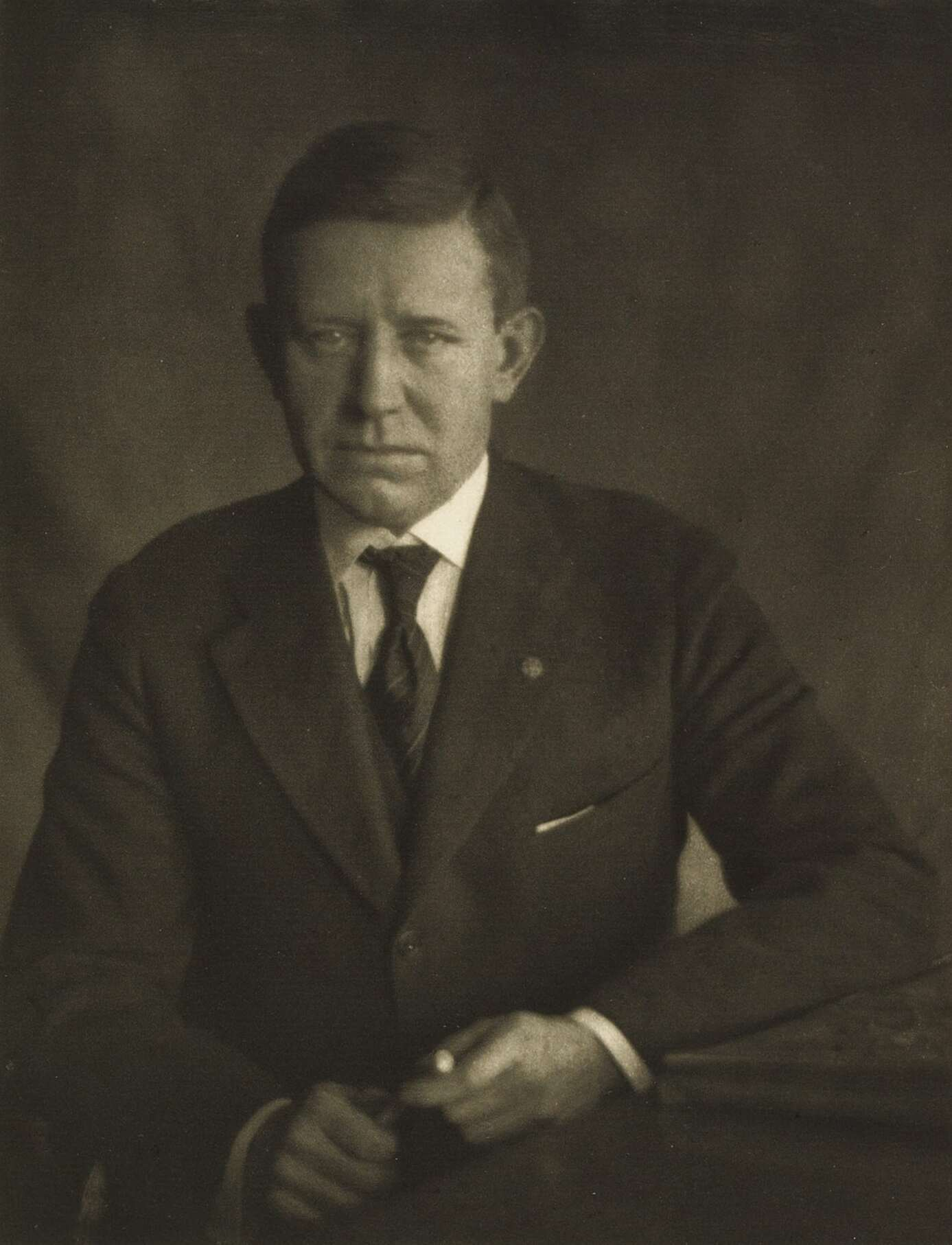
- Photograph of Smith taken by Doris Ulmann in 1922
- Born: 1877; West Scarborough, Maine, U.S.
- Died: November 13, 1961 (aged 83–84); Baltimore, Maryland, U.S.
- Resting place: Green Mount Cemetery; Baltimore, Maryland, U.S.
- Education: Bowdoin College (BA); Johns Hopkins University School of Medicine (MD)
- Spouse: Jean Maguire (m. 1905)

Signature
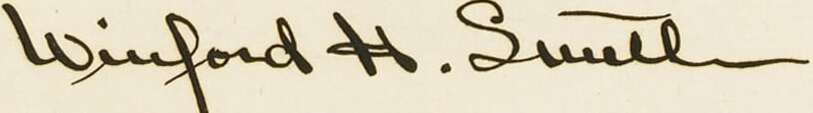

Winford Henry Smith (1877 – November 13, 1961) was an American physician. He served as superintendent and director of Johns Hopkins Hospital from 1911 to 1946.

== Early life ==
Winford Henry Smith was born in 1877 in West Scarborough, Maine. He graduated from Bowdoin College with a Bachelor of Arts in 1899 and a M.D. from Johns Hopkins University School of Medicine in 1903.

== Career ==
Smith interned and worked as resident gynecologist at Lakeside Hospital in Cleveland for two years. He then served as medical superintendent of several large hospitals. He worked as physician in charge of a hospital maintained by the New York Health Department. He then served as superintendent of a hospital in Hartford, Connecticut, and was superintendent of Bellevue and Allied Hospitals, including Fordham Hospital, Harlem Hospital Center and Gouverneur Hospital. In 1911, Smith came to Johns Hopkins Hospital and succeeded Henry Mills Hurd as superintendent. During his tenure, the role was renamed to director. He held that role until March 31, 1946, when he retired and was succeeded by Edwin L. Crosby. He then served as director emeritus.

In 1935, Smith was named chairman of the advisory committee of the municipal department of welfare. In 1939, he led the commission appointed by Maryland Governor to study hospital facilities in Maryland.

Smith served in both World War I and World War II. He was assigned to the hospital division of the Medical Reserve Corps. He served as a major in the Surgeon General's office during World War I. He was promoted to colonel. In January 1944, Smith was appointed as member and chairman of the medical supplies committee of the Combined Production and Resources Board in World War II.

Smith served as a consultant in the development of medical centers at Duke University, Cornell University, Vanderbilt University, Yale University, the University of Chicago and the University of California. He was an advocate for rehabilitation centers for the disabled, improvement of health care in rural areas and development of medical insurance programs.

Smith was a founding member of the Blue Cross of Maryland. Smith served as secretary for fifteen years and president for six years of the Medical Superintendents Club.

== Personal life ==
Smith married Jean Maguire in 1905. He lived at 100 West University Parkway in Baltimore.

In June 1956, Smith was injured in a traffic accident and received rib injuries. Smith died on November 13, 1961, at Johns Hopkins Hospital in Baltimore. He was buried at Green Mount Cemetery in Baltimore.

== Legacy and honors ==
Smith was awarded an honorary Doctor of Science degree by Bowdoin College. In June 1954, Smith was awarded an honorary Legum Doctor degree by Johns Hopkins.

He received the Army Distinguished Service Medal in 1922 for his service in World War I. In 1942, Smith received an annual award of merit of the American Hospital Association.
