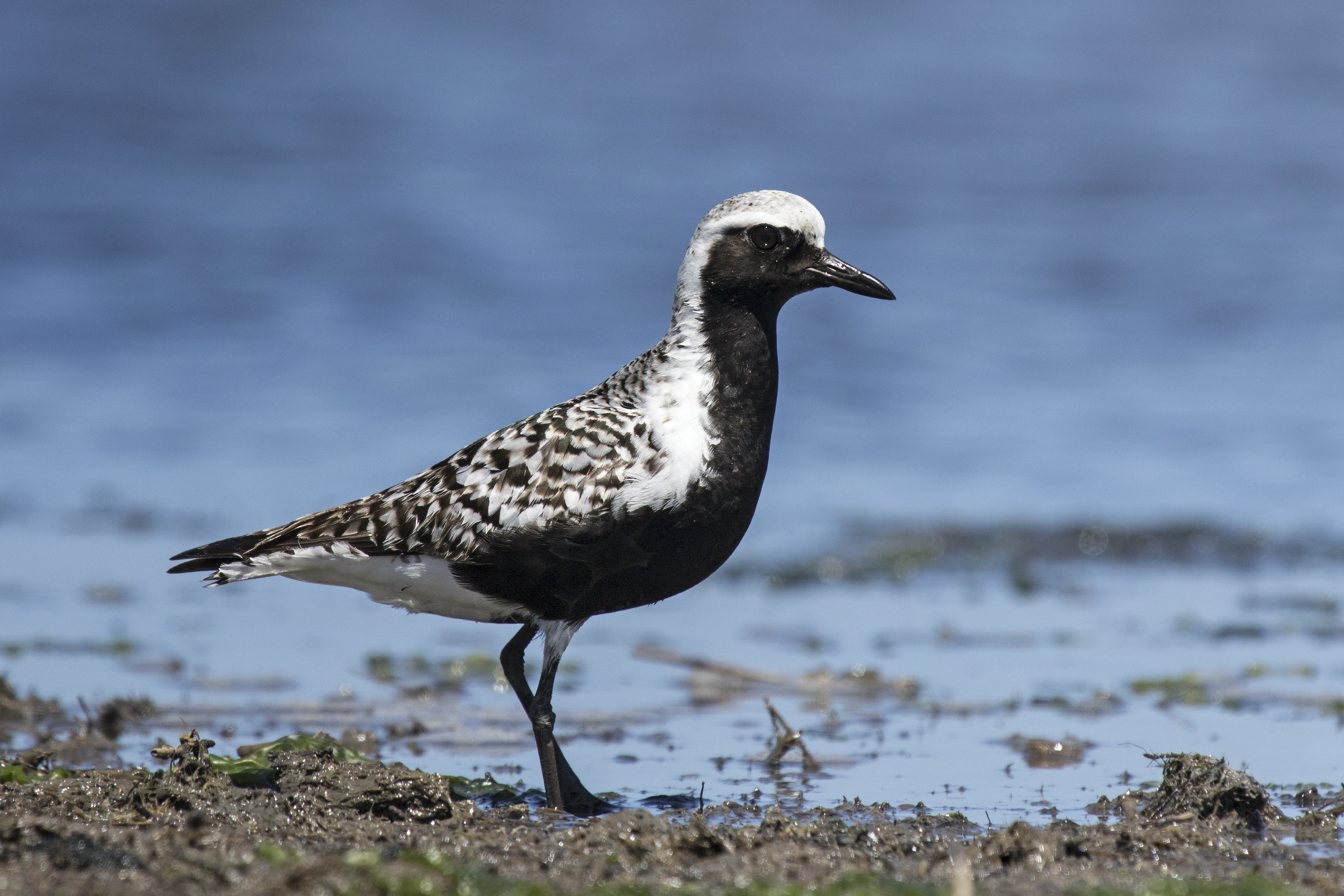
- Breeding plumage in the Great Bay WMA, NJ.
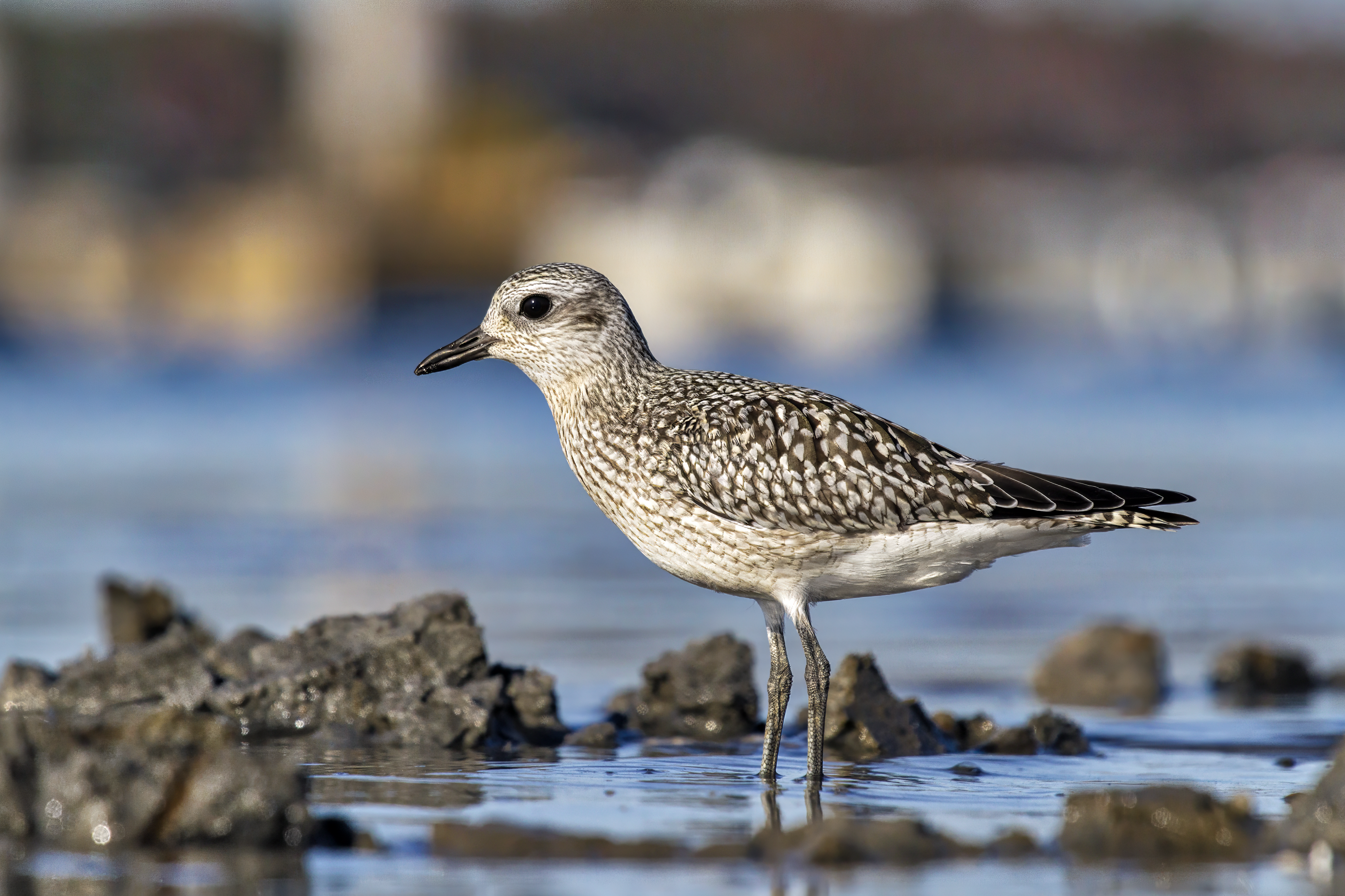
- Non-breeding plumage in Scarborough Marsh, Maine

Conservation status
- Vulnerable (IUCN 3.1)

Scientific classification
- Kingdom: Animalia
- Phylum: Chordata
- Class: Aves
- Order: Charadriiformes
- Family: Charadriidae
- Genus: Pluvialis
- Species: P. squatarola

Binomial name
- Pluvialis squatarola (Linnaeus, 1758)
- Distribution Breeding Migration Nonbreeding

Synonyms
- Tringa squatarola Linnaeus, 1758

= Grey plover =

Species of bird

The grey plover or black-bellied plover (Pluvialis squatarola) is a large plover breeding in Arctic regions. It is a long-distance migrant, with a nearly worldwide coastal distribution when not breeding.

== Taxonomy ==
The grey plover was formally described by the Swedish naturalist Carl Linnaeus in 1758 in the tenth edition of his Systema Naturae under the binomial name Tringa squatarola. It is now placed with three other plovers in the genus Pluvialis that was introduced by the French ornithologist Mathurin Jacques Brisson in 1760. The genus name is Latin and means relating to rain, from pluvia, "rain". It was believed that they flocked when rain was imminent. The species name squatarola is a Latinised version of Sgatarola, a Venetian name for some kind of plover.

The English common name used for this species differs in different parts of the world. It is generally known as "grey plover" in the Old World and "black-bellied plover" in the New World.

Three subspecies are recognised:

- P. s. squatarola (Linnaeus, 1758) – breeds in north Eurasia and Alaska; non-breeding in west, south Europe, Africa, south, east Asia and Australasia and west Americas
- P. s. tomkovichi Engelmoer & Roselaar, 1998 – breeds on Wrangel Island (northeast Siberia)
- P. s. cynosurae (Thayer & Bangs, 1914) – breeds north Canada; non-breeding along coastal North and South America

== Description ==
The grey plover is 27–30 cm (11–12 in) long with a wingspan of 71–83 cm (28–33 in) and a weight of 190–280 g (6.7–9.9 oz) (up to 345 g (12.2 oz) in preparation for migration). In spring and summer (late April or May to August), adults are spotted black and white on the back and wings. The face and neck are black with a white border; they have a black breast and belly and a white rump. The tail is white with black barring. The bill and legs are black. They moult to winter plumage in mid August to early September and retain this until April; this being a fairly plain grey above, with a grey-speckled breast and white belly. The juvenile and first-winter plumages, held by young birds from fledging until about one year old, are similar to the adult winter plumage but with the back feathers blacker with creamy white edging. In all plumages, the inner flanks and axillary feathers at the base of the underwing are black, a feature which readily distinguishes it from the other three Pluvialis species in flight. On the ground, it can also be told from the other Pluvialis species by its larger (24–34 mm, 0.94–1.34 in), heavier bill.

== Breeding and migration ==
Their breeding habitat is Arctic islands and coastal areas across the northern coasts of Alaska, Canada, and Russia. They nest on the ground in a dry open tundra with good visibility; the nest is a shallow gravel scrape. Four eggs (sometimes only three) are laid in early June, with an incubation period of 26–27 days; the chicks fledge when 35–45 days old.

They migrate to winter in coastal areas throughout the world. In the New World they winter from southwest British Columbia and Massachusetts south to Argentina and Chile, in the western Old World from Ireland and southwestern Norway south throughout coastal Africa to South Africa, and in the eastern Old World, from southern Japan south throughout coastal southern Asia and Australia, with a few reaching New Zealand. Most of the migrants to Australia are female. It makes regular non-stop transcontinental flights over Asia, Europe, and North America, but is mostly a rare vagrant on the ground in the interior of continents, only landing occasionally if forced down by severe weather, or to feed on the coast-like shores of very large lakes such as the Great Lakes, where it is a common passage migrant.

== Behaviour and ecology ==
=== Breeding ===
Young birds do not breed until two years old; they typically remain on the wintering grounds until their second summer.

=== Food and feeding ===
They forage for food on beaches and tidal flats, usually by sight. The food consists of small molluscs, polychaete worms, crustaceans, and insects. It is less gregarious than the other Pluvialis species, not forming dense feeding flocks, instead feeding widely dispersed over beaches, with birds well spaced apart. They will however form dense flocks on high tide roosts.

== Status ==
The International Union for Conservation of Nature (IUCN) has judged that the threat to the grey plover is of "Vulnerable". It is one of the species to which the Agreement on the Conservation of African-Eurasian Migratory Waterbirds (AEWA) applies.

== Gallery ==
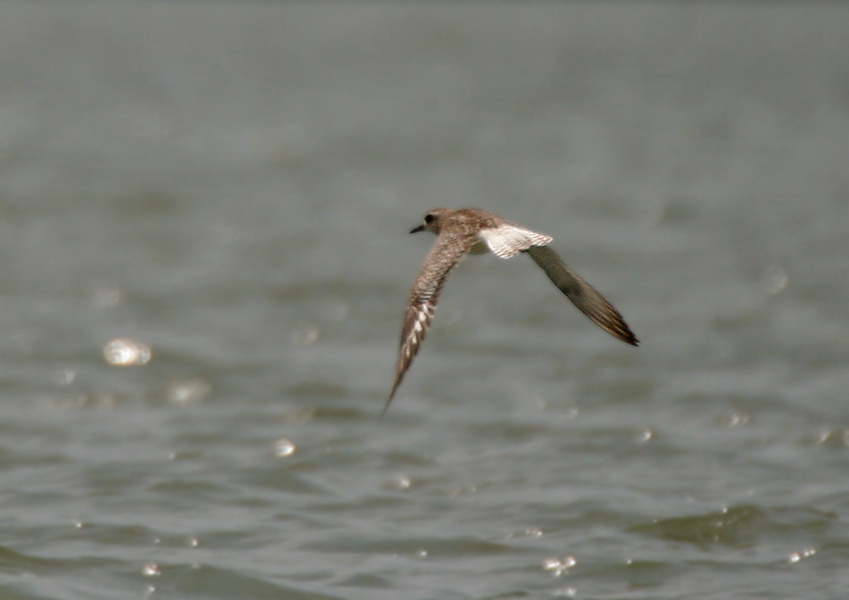
Bird at Krishna Wildlife Sanctuary, Andhra Pradesh, India

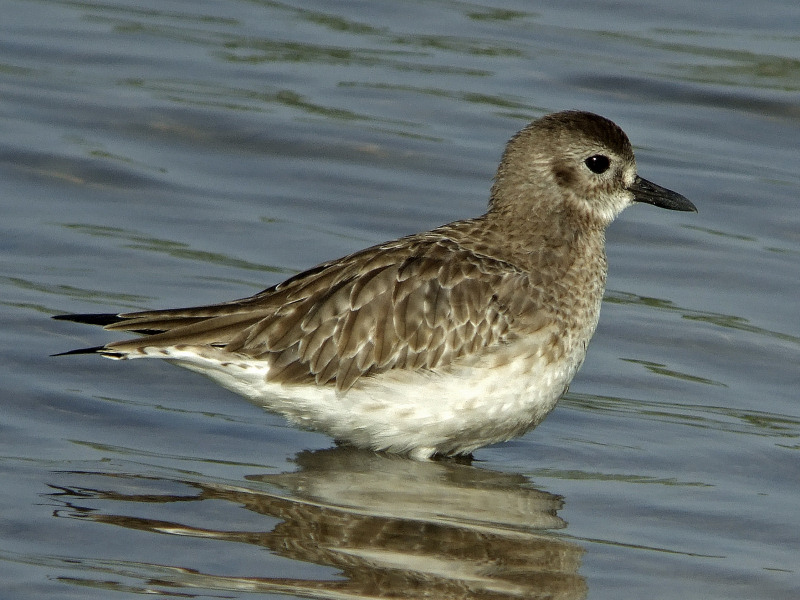
Adult in winter plumage

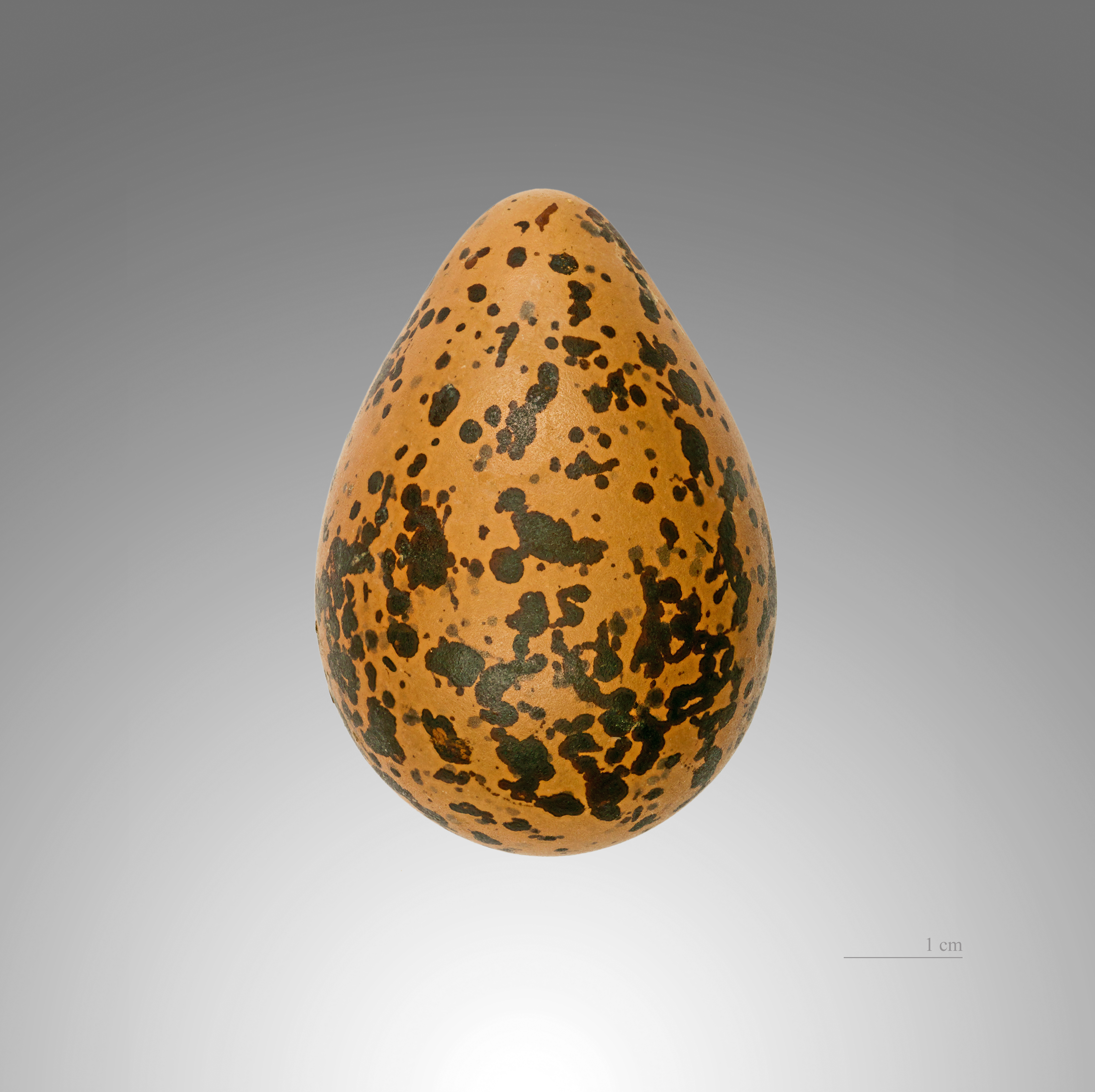
Pluvialis squatarola egg

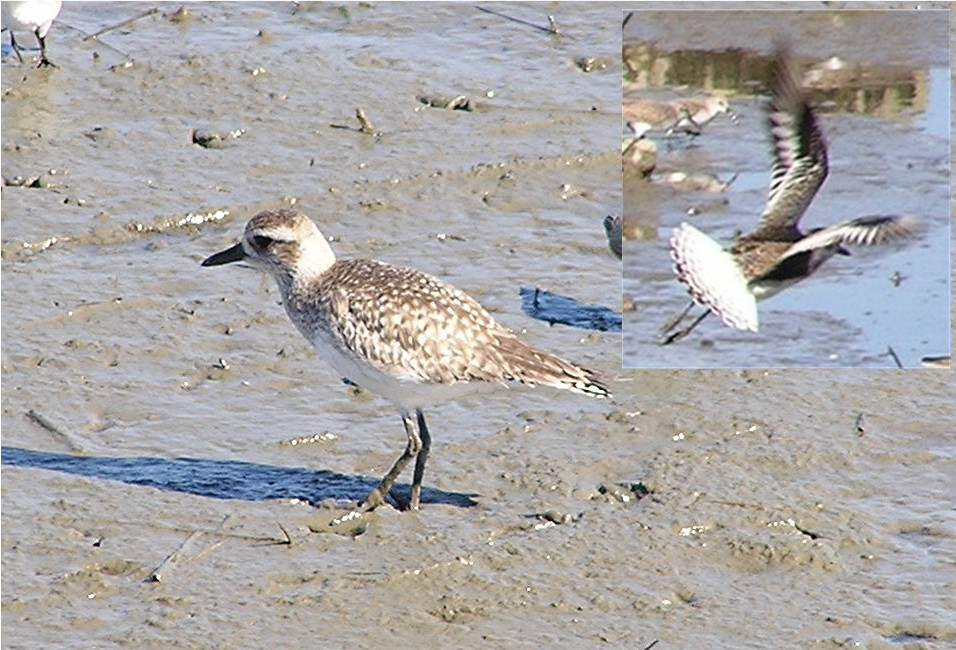
Bird in first-winter plumage; inset, in flight, showing the black axillaries and white rump and barred tail
