= Pine Point Beach =

Beach in Maine, USA

Coordinates: 43°32′26″N 70°20′13″W

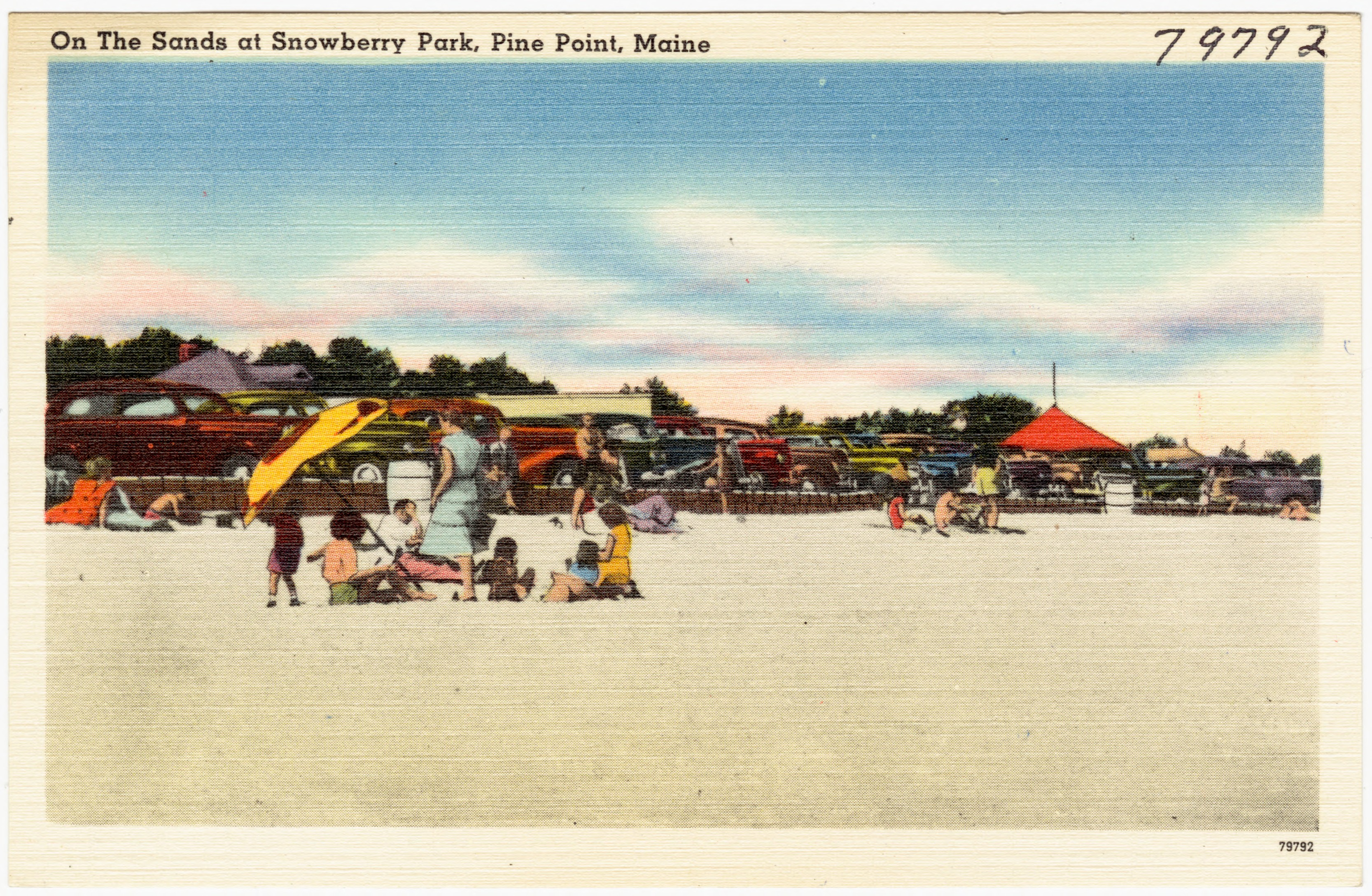
Snowberry Park, Pine Point, Maine_(79792)

Pine Point Beach is a four-mile municipal beach located on the northern edge of Saco Bay in Scarborough, Maine, United States. It spans the outlet of the Scarborough River. It has 7,000 feet of sandy ocean frontage. It also includes a sensitive sand dune system and a significant number of nearby commercial and residential buildings.
