= Saco Bay =

Bay off of Maine, US

Coordinates: 43°29′37″N 70°22′06″W

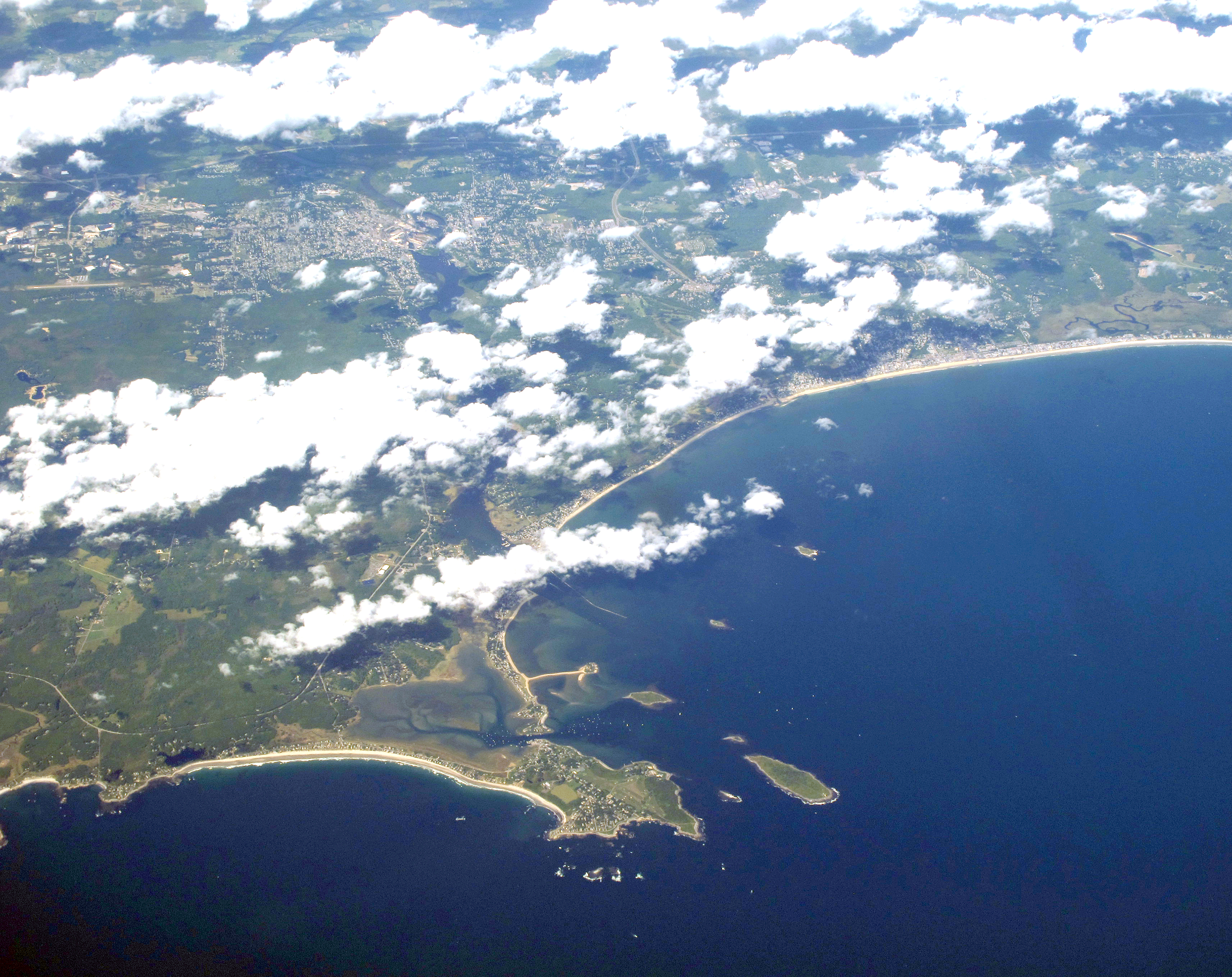
Aerial photograph of Saco Bay

Saco Bay (/ˈsɑːkoʊ/ SAH-koh) is a small curved embayment of the Gulf of Maine on the Atlantic coast of Maine in the United States.

Saco Bay is approximately 10 mi (16 km) wide, running from the Fletcher Neck (the Biddeford Pool peninsula) and the mouth of the Saco River in York County north to the Scarborough River and Prouts Neck in Scarborough, Cumberland County, Maine, approximately 13 mi (21 km) southwest of Portland. The shoreline of the bay makes the largest sand beach and salt marsh system in Maine and contains the longest unbroken stretch of beach in the state.

== Ecosystem ==
Construction of a railroad causeway in the 19th century led to the closure of the Little River Inlet. This tidal re-entrant had formed the county line between York and Cumberland counties and the town line between Scarborough and Old Orchard Beach. Prior to its closure, the Pine Point region of Scarborough was a barrier island, the only one in Maine. Behind Pine Point is the state run wildlife management area for Scarborough Marsh. The marsh is 15% of the state's total tidal marsh area and the largest contiguous marsh in Maine. The state owns and manages a 3,100-acre (13 km^{2}) reserve, of which 2,700 acres (11 km^{2}) is salt marsh, about 200 acres (0.81 km^{2}) is upland habitats, with the remainder being other types of wetlands. The marsh is an excellent site for birding as 72% of the water dependent birds that can be found in Maine can be found at the marsh. The marsh is located within 1.5 miles (2.4 km) of two nationally significant seabird nesting islands. The marsh has been designated essential habitat for endangered piping plovers and least terns. The Maine Audubon Society maintains a center at the marsh from which visitors can do hikes or rent a canoe and paddle through the marsh.

The U.S. National Marine Fisheries Service has designated Saco Bay as "essential fish habitat" for at least fifteen types of fish, including Atlantic salmon, hake, halibut, herring, and scallops. Stratton Island in the bay is a wildlife sanctuary owned and run by the National Audubon Society where multiple species of terns nest. Arctic, common, and roseate terns have been regulars, and in 2005 they were joined for the first time by nesting least terns.

== Sand movement and erosion ==
The United States Army Corps of Engineers (USACOE) initially thought that the beach sand was coming from an underwater glacial deposit. Thus when in 1866 they were called in to protect the navigable channel of the Saco river, they built rock jetties on both sides of the mouth of the Saco river to protect the channel from sand. The north jetty was extended in 1897, 1930 and 1938, and raised at various dates through 1969. The primary source of sediment for the beaches is the Saco river. Longshore drift is dominantly to the north along the shore. About 1960 another jetty was built on the south (Pine Point) side of the mouth of the Scarborough River to protect it from sand. It was not until 1992 that the USACOE acknowledged that there is no source of sand nourishment in the area. Thus, erosion is worst at Camp Ellis in Saco at the south end of the system where the Saco jetty prevents sand from coming ashore naturally while Pine Point is growing both from the sand coming out of the Saco river and from sand eroding from Camp Ellis and other parts of the bay to its south.

Much of the inner shore of the bay is within the town of Old Orchard Beach, Maine's largest resort beach community. The geology of the larger Gulf of Maine means that warm waters coming up the Atlantic Coast are kept far offshore, while the inshore waters are flowing from the north to the south, fed by the Labrador Current that originates from the glaciers of Greenland, making most Maine coastal waters very cold, especially to the east. The combination of Saco Bay's western location, the inland waters of the Saco river, and the bay's local flow from the south to the north make it the warmest water for swimming in Maine, although summer water temperatures regularly dip into the 50s (Fahrenheit).

== History ==
The bay was mapped in 1605 by the French explorer Samuel de Champlain, who named it the Baie de Chouacouët, also spelled Chouacoit or Chouacoet (as recorded in The Jesuit Relations), which de Champlain said was the name used by the indigenous Abenaki people of the area. His chart of the bay and the mouth of the river has been described as one of his best charts.

In 1616, Sir Ferdinando Gorges sent Richard Vines to settle in New England. He spent the winter of 1616–1617 on Saco Bay. A pestilence was raging among the Indians, and as Vines was a physician he attended to sick Indians in the area. In 1630 the Plymouth Company gave Richard Vines and John Oldham each a tract of land on the Saco River, four miles (6.4 km) wide on the sea and extending eight miles (13 km) inland.

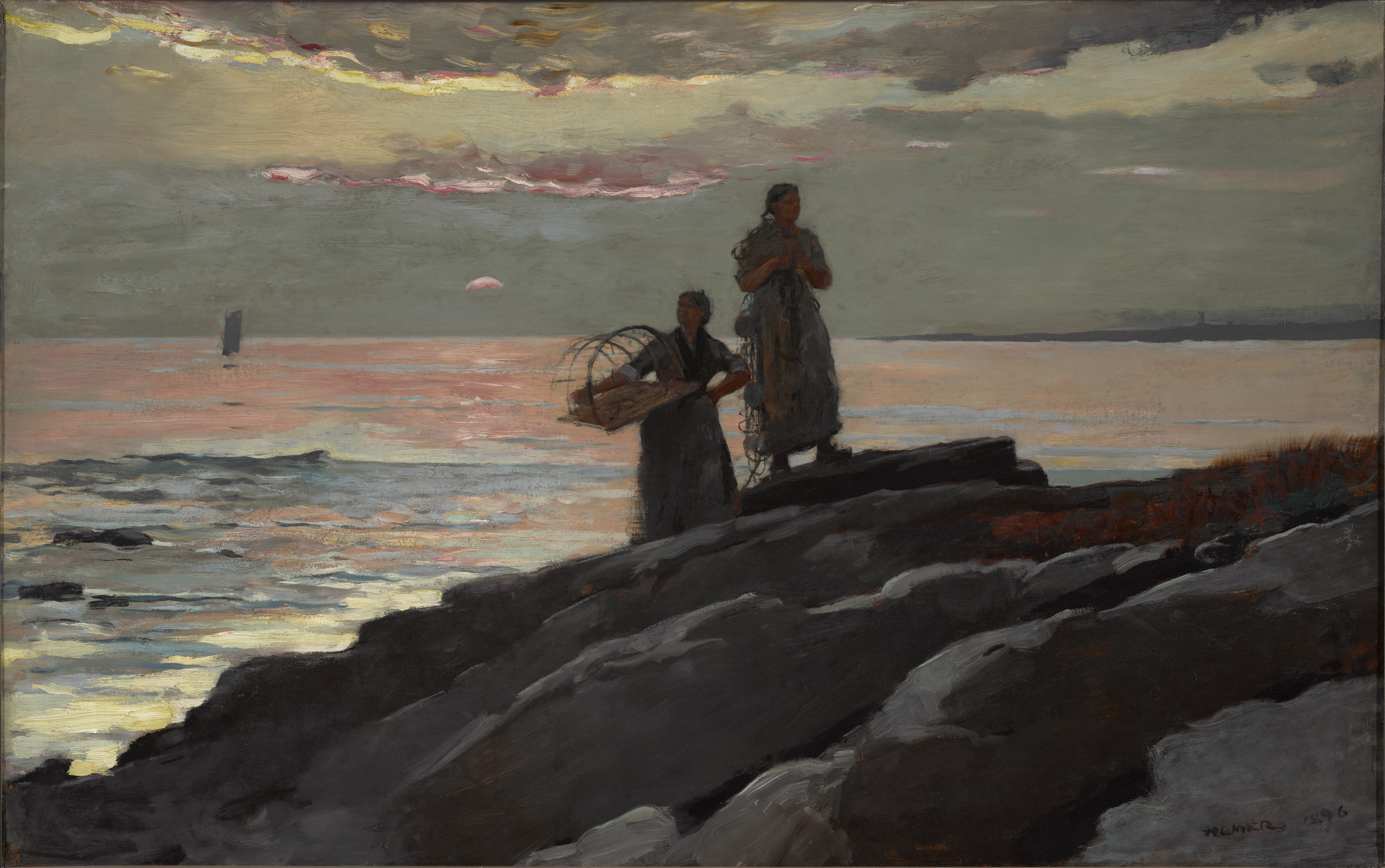
Winslow Homer, Saco Bay, 1896. Clark Art Institute.

== Winslow Homer painting ==
Saco Bay or Sunset, Saco Bay is a painting by Winslow Homer, showing a view of the bay from Checkley Point on the southwestern side of Prouts Neck. According to Winslow he worked on it for about 10 years, finishing only 3 days before shipping it for exhibition. It was first exhibited in 1897 at the Society of American Artists in New York City. The painting is now at the Sterling and Francine Clark Art Institute.
