= Scarborough Public Library =

Coordinates: 43.596°N 70.3361°W

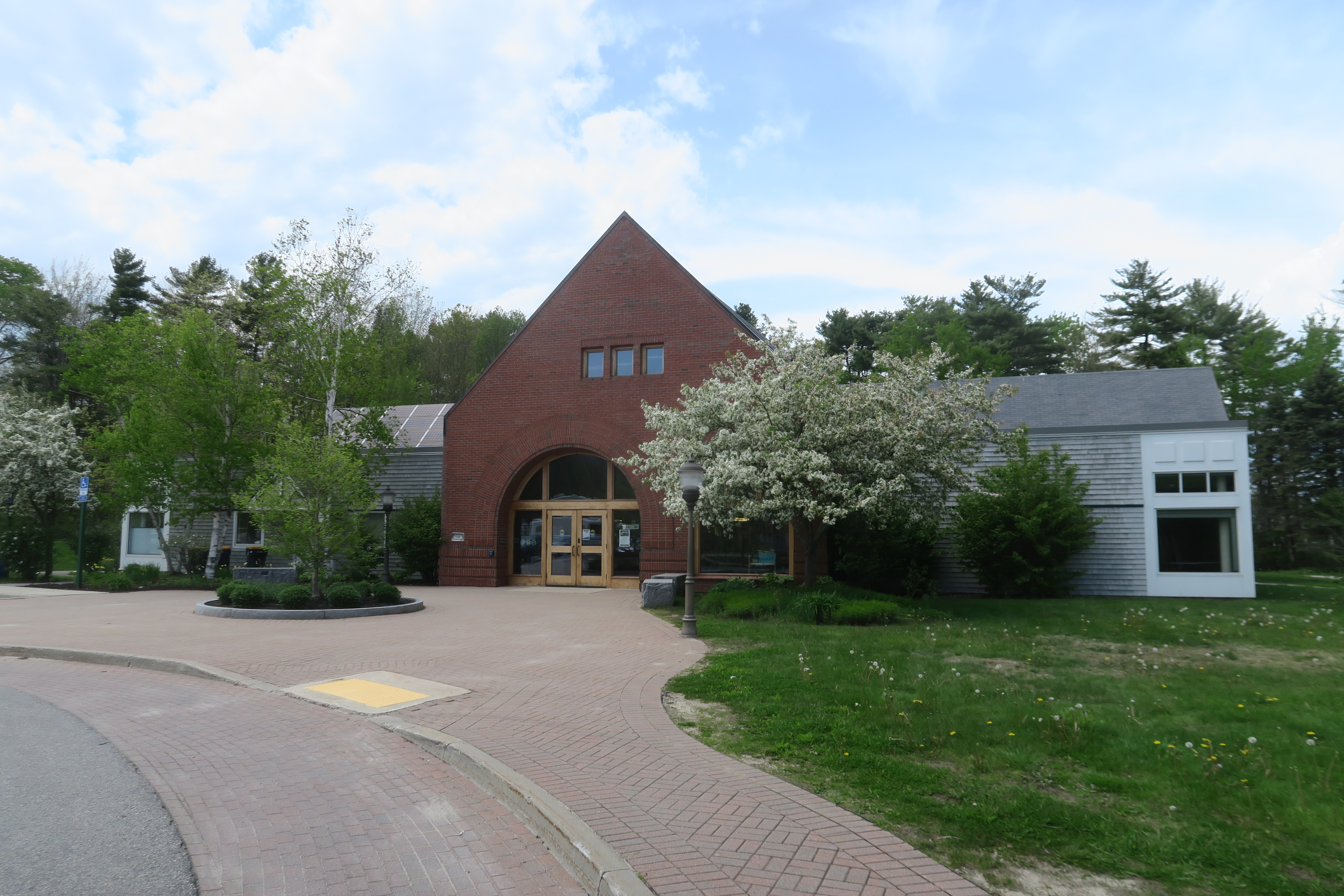
- Location: Scarborough, Maine, United States
- Type: Public
- Established: 1899

Collection
- Size: 62,000

Access and use
- Circulation: 160,000
- Population served: 18,919

Other information
- Budget: $977,624
- Director: Nancy Crowell
- Employees: 21
- Website: www.scarboroughlibrary.org

The Scarborough Public Library is the public library serving Scarborough, Maine, United States. The library is located at 48 Gorham Road Scarborough, ME 04074.
