= North Scarborough =

Coordinates: 43°38′31.8″N 70°23′52.0″W

North Scarborough is an area within the town of Scarborough, Maine.

It is centered on the intersection of Maine Route 22 (County Road) with Beech Ridge Road and Saco Street, and the adjacent junction of Route 22 and Maine Route 114 (Gorham Road). It is closely linked with the adjacent area of West Scarborough - in local perception, they're often mutually inclusive. North Scarborough borders the neighboring towns of Westbrook, Maine and Gorham, Maine. The abutting Gorham portion is referred to as South Gorham. Both Gorham and Scarborough co-locate emergency equipment in the North Scarborough Fire Station. Historically the intersection of Route 22 and Saco Street was called Coal Kiln Corner. North Scarborough sits atop a significant gravel aquifer.

Notable neighborhood landmarks and businesses include the North Scarborough Grange Hall, Smiling Hill Farm, Wassamki Springs Campground, Beech Ridge Motor Speedway, Beech Ridge Farm and the Scarborough Fire Department's North Scarborough station.

== Related links ==
- Smiling Hill Farm
- Wassamki Springs Campground
- Beech Ridge Motor Speedway
