= Daniel R. Warren =

Former Maine State Legislator

Daniel R. "Dan" Warren is an American attorney, former politician, and longtime baseball coach from Scarborough, Maine. A Democrat, Warren served two terms in the Maine House of Representatives during the 112th and 113th Maine Legislatures, from 1984 to 1988, representing a district that included parts of Scarborough and Saco. He later served on the Scarborough Town Council from 1988 to 1991.

Warren practiced law in Scarborough for more than four decades. He has also had a longtime involvement in baseball in Scarborough, including coaching and serving as general manager of the Libby-Mitchell American Legion Post 76 baseball program. Warren directed the Post 76 baseball program from 1999 through 2017 and was inducted into the Maine Baseball Hall of Fame in 2017.
