= Linwood M. Higgins =

American politician

Linwood M. Higgins (born January 11, 1948) is an American politician from Maine. Higgins, a Republican from Scarborough, served 8 terms (1974–1990) in the Maine House of Representatives. From 1980 to 1984, Higgins served as Minority Leader of the Maine House. He ran for the Maine House of Representatives in 2018, but lost the general election to Chris Caiazzo.
