= Dunstan, Maine =

- Census-designated place
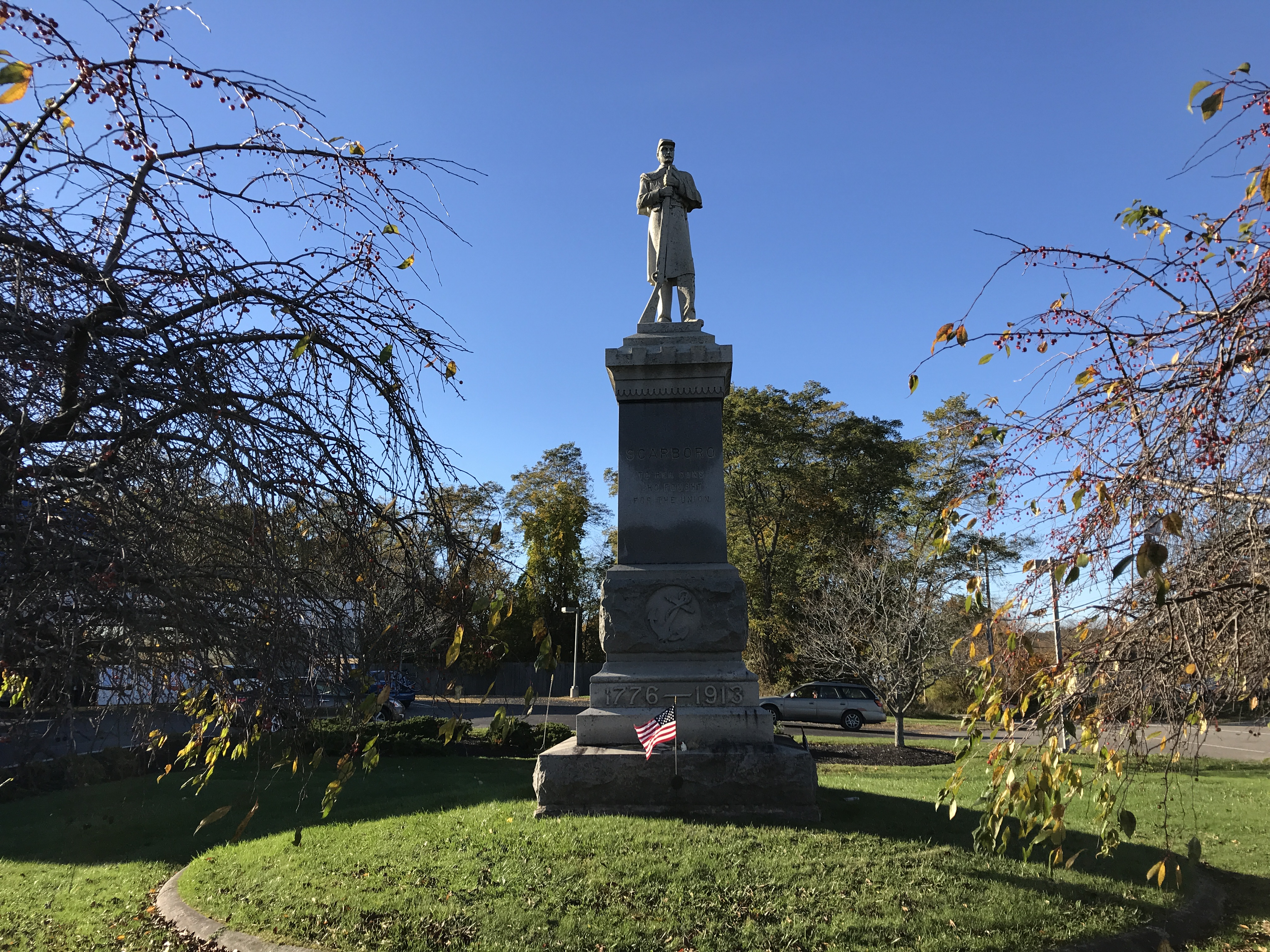
- Soldiers' and Sailors' Monument

- Location within Maine Location within the United States
- Coordinates: 43°33′58″N 70°22′45″W
- Country: United States
- State: Maine
- County: Cumberland
- Town: Scarborough

Area
  - Total: 3.19 sq mi (8.26 km^{2})
  - Land: 3.16 sq mi (8.19 km^{2})
  - Water: 0.027 sq mi (0.07 km^{2})
- Elevation: 66 ft (20 m)

Population (2020)
  - Total: 2,083
  - Density: 658.9/sq mi (254.39/km^{2})
- Time zone: UTC-5 (Eastern (EST))
  - Summer (DST): UTC-4 (EDT)
- ZIP Code: 04074 (Scarborough)
- Area code: 207
- FIPS code: 23-18965
- GNIS feature ID: 2806277

Dunstan is a census-designated place (CDP) in the town of Scarborough, Cumberland County, Maine, United States. Also known as West Scarborough, the community is in the southwest part of the town, along U.S. Route 1. Maine State Route 9 runs northward from Dunstan with US 1 towards Portland but leads southeastward out of the community as Pine Point Road, towards Old Orchard Beach. Interstate 95 (the Maine Turnpike) forms the northwestern edge of the CDP, and the York County line is the southwestern border, with the city of Saco directly adjacent to Dunstan. The northeast edge of the CDP is the Dunstan River, an arm of the tidal Scarborough River.

As of the 2020 census, Dunstan had a population of 2,083.

Dunstan was first listed as a CDP prior to the 2020 census.

== Demographics ==
Historical population
Census	Pop.	Note	%±
2020	2,083		—
U.S. Decennial Census

=== 2020 census ===
As of the 2020 census, Dunstan had a population of 2,083. The median age was 46.9 years. 19.4% of residents were under the age of 18 and 19.9% of residents were 65 years of age or older. For every 100 females there were 101.5 males, and for every 100 females age 18 and over there were 100.5 males age 18 and over.

83.0% of residents lived in urban areas, while 17.0% lived in rural areas.

There were 885 households in Dunstan, of which 30.5% had children under the age of 18 living in them. Of all households, 51.0% were married-couple households, 13.1% were households with a male householder and no spouse or partner present, and 28.2% were households with a female householder and no spouse or partner present. About 29.0% of all households were made up of individuals and 11.8% had someone living alone who was 65 years of age or older.

There were 924 housing units, of which 4.2% were vacant. The homeowner vacancy rate was 0.7% and the rental vacancy rate was 2.5%.

Racial composition as of the 2020 census
Race	Number	Percent
White	1,810	86.9%
Black or African American	140	6.7%
American Indian and Alaska Native	8	0.4%
Asian	52	2.5%
Native Hawaiian and Other Pacific Islander	0	0.0%
Some other race	7	0.3%
Two or more races	66	3.2%
Hispanic or Latino (of any race)	43	2.1%
