= Libby River =

Coordinates: 43.54925°N 70.32838°W

Location
- Country: United States

Physical characteristics
- Source
  - location: Maine

The Libby River is a 5.2-mile-long (8.4 km) river in the town of Scarborough, Maine, in the United States. It is tidal in its lower reaches, and it is a tributary of the Scarborough River, joining it just above that river's mouth at the Atlantic Ocean.

== See also ==
- List of rivers of Maine
