= Dunstan River =

Coordinates: 43.56258°N 70.37116°W

Location
- Country: United States

Physical characteristics
- Source
  - location: Maine

The Dunstan River is a 6.0-mile-long (9.7 km) river in the town of Scarborough in Cumberland County, Maine, USA. Its lower portion flows through salt marshes and it is a tributary of the tidal Scarborough River.

== See also ==
- List of rivers of Maine
