= Nonesuch River =

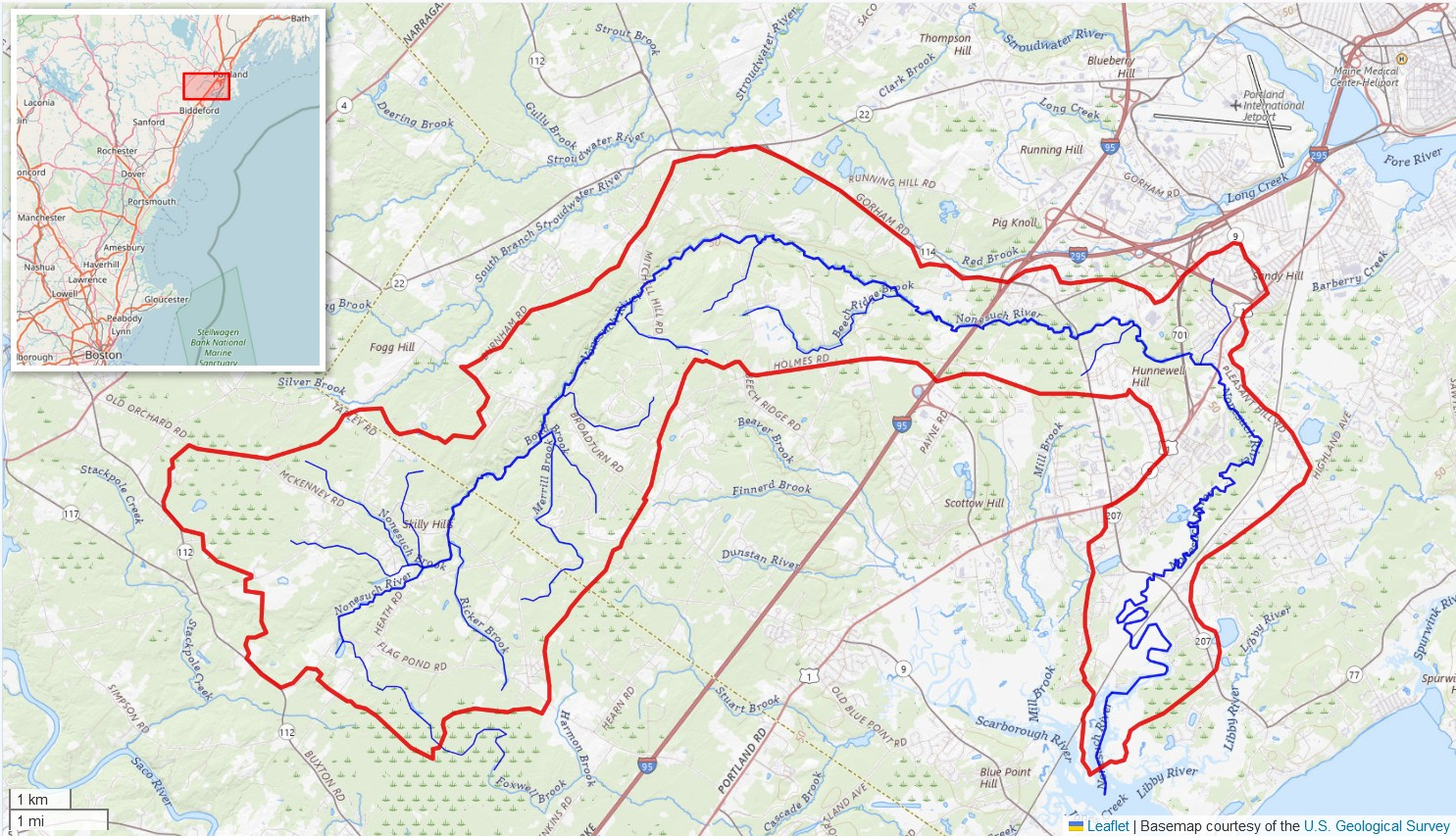
- Nonesuch River watershed (Interactive map)

Location
- Country: United States of America

Physical characteristics
- Source
  - location: Marsh west of Berry Hill Saco, Maine
  - coordinates: 43.570°N 70.501°W
- Mouth
  - location: Scarborough River
  - coordinates: 43.551°N 70.501°W
  - elevation: 0 (Sea Level)
- Length: 25 mi (40 km)
- Basin size: 25 mi^{2} (65 km^{2})

The Nonesuch River is a 24.9-mile-long (40.1 km) river in southern Maine in the United States. It rises in Saco and travels northeast, then east, then southwest through the town of Scarborough, becoming the primary source of fresh water to the Scarborough Marsh and the Scarborough River. It has several brooks as tributaries.

It is a small, winding river, tidal over its lower reaches, which large boats could not navigate. At one point a canal was constructed to follow its course. The work was constructed by the expedient of digging a shallow ditch along the planned course and letting the tidal action carry the loose soil out to sea.

Nonesuch River Golf Course is located nearby.
