= Scarborough River =

Coordinates: 43.5616°N 70.3696°W

Location
- Country: United States

Physical characteristics
- Source
  - location: Scarborough, Maine
- Mouth
  - location: Saco Bay

Scarborough River is a 3.7-mile-long (6.0 km) coastal estuary and river draining through the Scarborough Marsh in Scarborough, Maine. It empties into Saco Bay between Pine Point Beach and Western Beach and marks the bay's northern end. The main tributaries are the Nonesuch River, Dunstan River, and Libby River, as well as smaller brooks and streams.

In its natural state, it was a sediment sink for Saco Bay, storing sediment migrating northward up the bay from the beaches to the south and ultimately from the Saco River. The channel migrated regularly in response to natural events; as it did so, abandoned sand banks would replenish the sand on both Pine Point Beach to the south and Western and Ferry beaches to the north.

In the early 17th century, Christopher Levett gave the name of the river, or perhaps the marshes it drains, as Owascoag, after the Abenaki Indian name. The English fishing fleet offshore in 1624 was over 50 vessels, and the shores of the river were settled by fishermen and their families early in the period of English settlement; when the primary road in Maine ran along the coastline for its entire length, a ferry operated across the mouth of the river, running from Pine Point Beach to Ferry Beach.

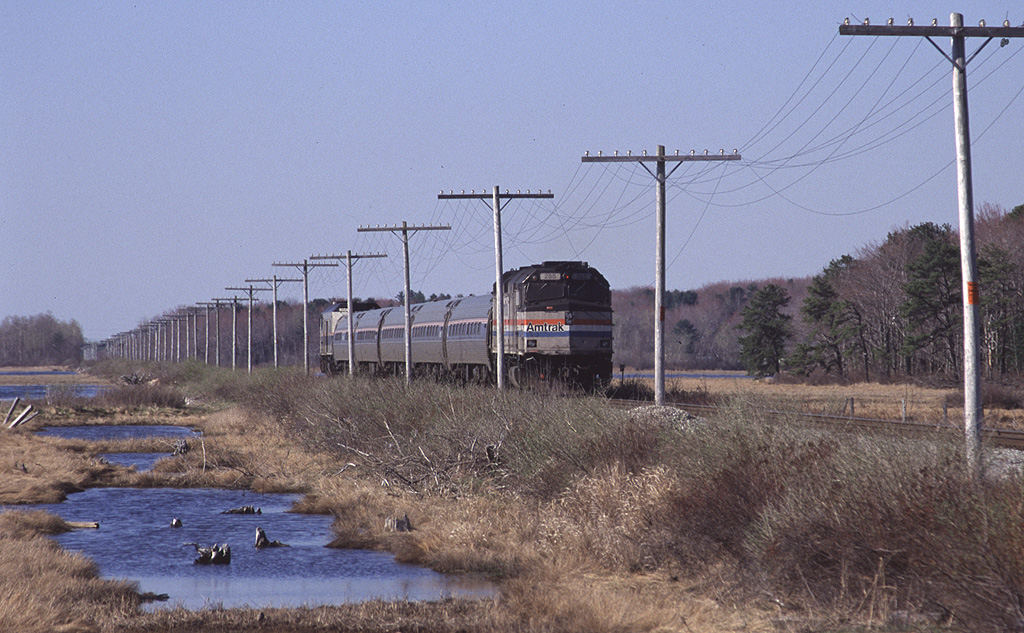
A Downeaster passenger train traveling across Scarborough Marsh

In the late 19th century, Little River Inlet, a tidal reentrant located at the south end of Pine Point Beach, was dammed and diverted into the Scarborough River. In 1962, the Army Corps of Engineers stabilized the river channel, in part by building a jetty at the southern edge of the river mouth. This has allowed a stable river channel for use by those fishing and pleasure boats harbored in the river and for occasional launches from a town-managed dock. The stabilized channel gradually fills with sediment, and has needed to be dredged roughly every five years. Materials from the 2004 dredging were deposited on Western Beach in imitation of the natural sediment flow.
