= Oak Hill, Maine =

Oak Hill, Maine Scarborough
- Census-designated place
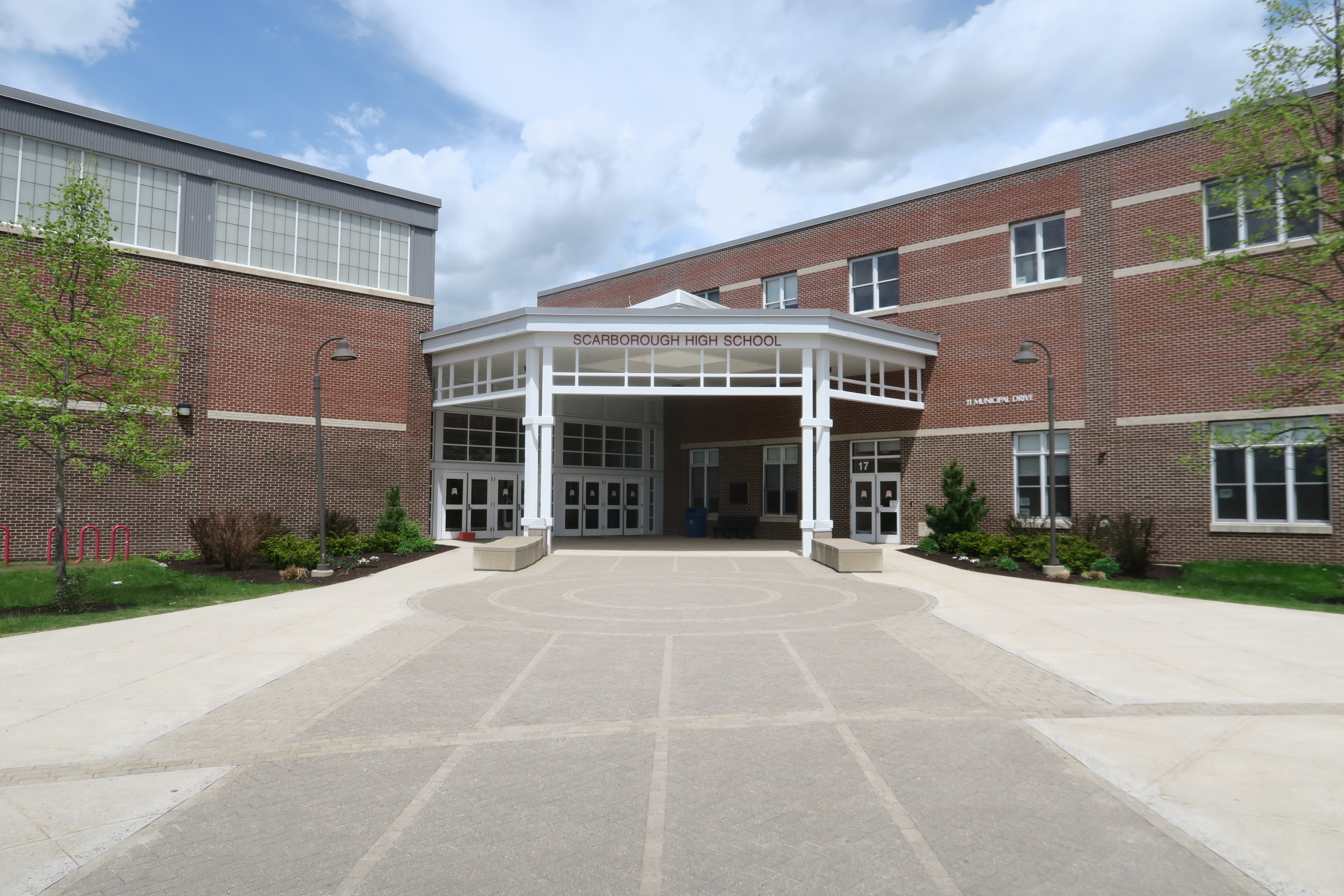
- Scarborough High School

- Location in Cumberland County and the state of Maine
- Coordinates: 43°35′53″N 70°20′16″W
- Country: United States
- State: Maine
- County: Cumberland
- Town: Scarborough

Area
  - Total: 5.62 sq mi (14.56 km^{2})
  - Land: 5.61 sq mi (14.53 km^{2})
  - Water: 0.012 sq mi (0.03 km^{2})
- Elevation: 59 ft (18 m)

Population (2020)
  - Total: 5,846
  - Density: 1,042.3/sq mi (402.45/km^{2})
- Time zone: UTC-5 (Eastern (EST))
  - Summer (DST): UTC-4 (EDT)
- ZIP codes: 04070, 04074
- Area code: 207
- FIPS code: 23-54490
- GNIS feature ID: 2377954

Oak Hill is a census-designated place (CDP) in the town of Scarborough in Cumberland, Maine, United States. Prior to the 2020 census, the CDP was known as Scarborough. As of the 2020 census, Oak Hill had a population of 5,846. It is part of the Portland–South Portland–Biddeford, Maine Metropolitan Statistical Area.

== Geography ==
According to the United States Census Bureau, the CDP has a total area of 5.0 square miles (12.9 km^{2}), of which 0.012 square miles (0.03 km^{2}), or 0.27%, is water.

== Demographics ==
Historical population
Census	Pop.	Note	%±
2020	5,846		—
U.S. Decennial Census

=== 2020 census ===
As of the 2020 census, Oak Hill had a population of 5,846. The median age was 49.4 years. 15.9% of residents were under the age of 18 and 29.2% of residents were 65 years of age or older. For every 100 females there were 82.2 males, and for every 100 females age 18 and over there were 80.4 males age 18 and over.

99.8% of residents lived in urban areas, while 0.2% lived in rural areas.

There were 2,569 households in Oak Hill, of which 23.9% had children under the age of 18 living in them. Of all households, 45.0% were married-couple households, 15.2% were households with a male householder and no spouse or partner present, and 33.8% were households with a female householder and no spouse or partner present. About 34.1% of all households were made up of individuals and 18.4% had someone living alone who was 65 years of age or older.

There were 2,723 housing units, of which 5.7% were vacant. The homeowner vacancy rate was 0.2% and the rental vacancy rate was 4.5%.

Racial composition as of the 2020 census
Race	Number	Percent
White	5,039	86.2%
Black or African American	106	1.8%
American Indian and Alaska Native	13	0.2%
Asian	454	7.8%
Native Hawaiian and Other Pacific Islander	1	0.0%
Some other race	23	0.4%
Two or more races	210	3.6%
Hispanic or Latino (of any race)	83	1.4%

=== 2000 census ===
As of the census of 2000, there were 3,867 people, 1,615 households, and 1,046 families residing in the CDP. The population density was 777.1 inhabitants per square mile (300.0/km^{2}). There were 1,697 housing units at an average density of 341.0 per square mile (131.7/km^{2}). The racial makeup of the CDP was 96.15% White, 0.47% Black or African American, 0.26% Native American, 1.99% Asian, 0.31% from other races, and 0.83% from two or more races. Hispanic or Latino of any race were 0.80% of the population.

There were 1,615 households, out of which 29.4% had children under the age of 18 living with them, 54.4% were married couples living together, 8.1% had a female householder with no husband present, and 35.2% were non-families. 27.1% of all households were made up of individuals, and 11.1% had someone living alone who was 65 years of age or older. The average household size was 2.35 and the average family size was 2.90.

In the CDP, the population was spread out, with 22.3% under the age of 18, 5.8% from 18 to 24, 31.9% from 25 to 44, 22.2% from 45 to 64, and 17.7% who were 65 years of age or older. The median age was 39 years. For every 100 females, there were 88.0 males. For every 100 females age 18 and over, there were 83.9 males.

The median income for a household in the CDP was $46,705, and the median income for a family was $60,037. Males had a median income of $37,891 versus $27,407 for females. The per capita income for the CDP was $24,013. About 5.2% of families and 7.7% of the population were below the poverty line, including 6.4% of those under age 18 and 3.0% of those age 65 or over.
