= Scarborough, Maine =

Town in Maine, United States

- Town
- Seal

- Location in Cumberland County and the state of Maine
- Coordinates: 43°35′45″N 70°21′10″W
- Country: United States
- State: Maine
- County: Cumberland
- Settled: 1635
- Incorporated: July 14, 1658
- Communities: Blue Point; Dunstan; Eight Corners; Grand Beach; Higgins Beach; North Scarborough; Oak Hill; Pine Point; Pleasant Hill; Prouts Neck; Scarborough; West Scarborough

Government
  - Type: Council-Manager

Area
  - Total: 70.63 sq mi (182.93 km^{2})
  - Land: 47.61 sq mi (123.31 km^{2})
  - Water: 23.02 sq mi (59.62 km^{2})
- Elevation: 20 ft (6.1 m)

Population (2020)
  - Total: 22,135
  - Density: 465/sq mi (179.5/km^{2})
- Time zone: UTC-5 (Eastern (EST))
  - Summer (DST): UTC-4 (EDT)
- ZIP codes: 04070, 04074
- Area code: 207
- FIPS code: 23-66145
- GNIS feature ID: 582714
- Website: Official website

Scarborough is a town in Cumberland County on the southern coast of the U.S. state of Maine. Located about 7 miles (11 km) south of Portland, Scarborough is part of the Portland–South Portland–Biddeford, Maine metropolitan statistical area. The population was 22,135 at the 2020 census, making it the 6th most populous municipality in Maine, as well as the largest in the state to be referred to as "Town".

== History ==
In about 1630, John V. Stratton opened a trading post on Stratton Island in Saco Bay off Scarborough's shore. In 1631, the Plymouth Council for New England granted the "Black Point Patent" to Captain Thomas Cammock, nephew of the Earl of Warwick. Cammock built a house and began residence in 1635 on the 1,500-acre (6.1 km^{2}) tract of land, which extended from the Spurwink River to Black Point—today this area is known as Prouts Neck. While on a voyage to the West Indies, in 1643, Thomas Cammock died at Barbadoes. Having no heirs, his patent was conveyed to his wife, Margaret Cammock. Settlements developed at Black Point, Blue Point (i.e., Pine Point), Dunstan (i.e., West Scarborough) and Stratton Island. By 1650, there were fifty homes. The town offered excellent fishing and farming. On July 14, 1658, the Massachusetts General Court incorporated all of those settlements as Scarborough, named for Scarborough in Yorkshire, England.

At the outbreak of King Philip's War in 1675, Scarborough was an important coastal settlement with over one hundred houses and one thousand head of cattle. By 1676, the town had been laid to waste as a result of the war—some settlers were killed and others were taken hostage by the Native Americans. Subsequently, Massachusetts sent soldiers accompanied by Indian allies in 1677 to secure the town for resettlement. On June 29, 1677, while pursuing some Indians sent as a ruse, the company was ambushed by warriors under Chief Squandro. In the New England militia of nearly one hundred soldiers, fifty to sixty were left dead or mortally wounded. Among the casualties was Captain Benjamin Swett. Called the Battle at Moore's Brook. In 1681, a great fort was erected at Black Point. After several attempts to rebuild between guerrilla incursions during King William's War, the survivors evacuated in 1690 and moved south to Portsmouth, New Hampshire or Boston.

A truce was signed in 1699 between the Province of Massachusetts Bay and the Eastern Indians. Resettlement of Scarborough started in 1702 when seven settlers arrived from Lynn, Massachusetts, and construction began on a fort located on the western shore of Prout's Neck's Garrison's Cove. This fort was commanded by Captain John Larrabee.

Despite the treaty, in August 1703, five hundred French and Indians under command of the Sieur de Beaubassin made a sudden descent upon English settlements from Casco Bay (Portland) to Wells. The fort on Prout's Neck sat atop a bluff. When the French and Native Americans arrived, they were protected from gunfire by the overhanging cliff. They subsequently began tunneling into the bluff to breach the fort from below. Had it not been for a two-day downpour that made the disturbed bank slough, exposing the previously hidden excavators to snipers in the fort, the French and Native Americans might have been successful in their attempts to capture the fort and the eight people inside. However, Beaubassin retreated in search of easier prey.

Despite occasional subsequent harassment, the second settlement succeeded. By 1749, it was economically prosperous. Cattle and timber were important local products for export, with Scarborough's many water power sites operating a dozen sawmills.

== Geography ==
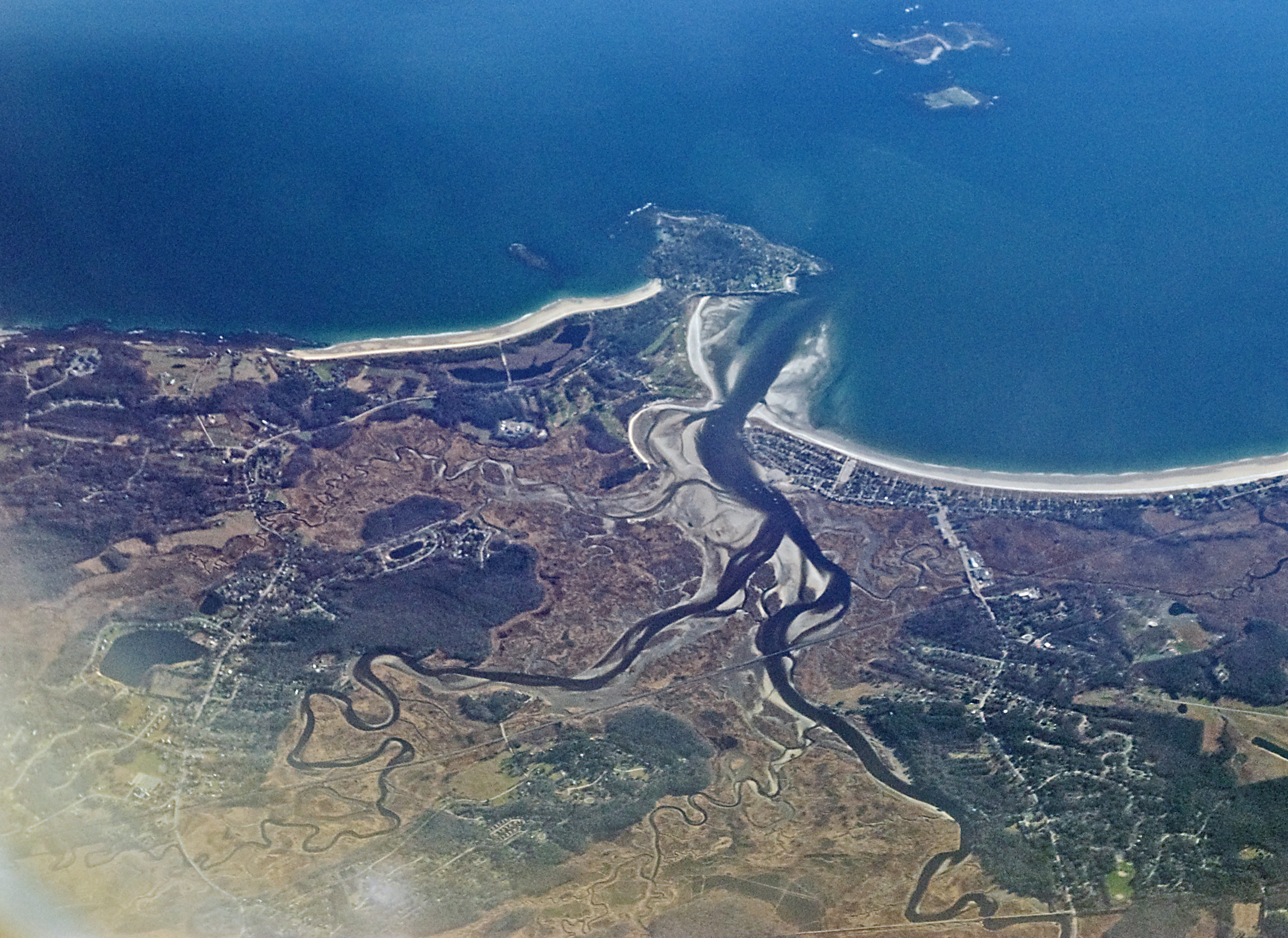
Scarborough from the air, looking to the southeast (December 2015). Note the Prouts Neck Peninsula and the Scarborough River and its tributaries.

According to the United States Census Bureau, the town has a total area of 70.63 square miles (182.93 km^{2}), of which 47.61 square miles (123.31 km^{2}) is land and 23.02 square miles (59.62 km^{2}) is water. Drained by the Scarborough River, Nonesuch River, Libby River and Spurwink River, the town is situated beside the Gulf of Maine, part of the Atlantic Ocean. The highest point is Beech Ridge, elevation 215 feet (66 m). In early years of Scarborough's settlement bonfires were set on Scottow Hill, elevation 144 feet (44 m), as warnings to the surrounding countryside of approaching danger.

Scarborough is crossed by Interstate 95, Interstate 295, U.S. Route 1, and State Routes 9, 77, 114, and 207. It is bordered by the town of Cape Elizabeth to the northeast, South Portland and Westbrook to the north and northwest, Gorham and Buxton to the west, and Saco and Old Orchard Beach to the south and southwest.

== Demographics ==
Historical population
Census	Pop.	Note	%±
1800	2,099		—
1810	2,094		−0.2%
1820	2,232		6.6%
1830	2,106		−5.6%
1840	2,172		3.1%
1850	1,837		−15.4%
1860	1,807		−1.6%
1870	1,692		−6.4%
1880	1,847		9.2%
1890	1,794		−2.9%
1900	1,865		4.0%
1910	1,945		4.3%
1920	1,832		−5.8%
1930	2,445		33.5%
1940	2,842		16.2%
1950	4,600		61.9%
1960	6,418		39.5%
1970	7,845		22.2%
1980	11,347		44.6%
1990	12,518		10.3%
2000	16,970		35.6%
2010	18,919		11.5%
2020	22,135		17.0%
U.S. Decennial Census

=== 2010 census ===
As of the census of 2010, there were 18,919 people, 7,506 households, and 5,201 families living in the town. The population density was 397.4 inhabitants per square mile (153.4/km^{2}). There were 8,617 housing units at an average density of 181.0 per square mile (69.9/km^{2}). The racial makeup of the town was 94.9% White, 0.5% African American, 0.2% Native American, 2.7% Asian, 0.3% from other races, and 1.4% from two or more races. Hispanic or Latino of any race were 1.2% of the population.

There were 7,506 households, of which 33.0% had children under the age of 18 living with them, 58.0% were married couples living together, 8.0% had a female householder with no husband present, 3.3% had a male householder with no wife present, and 30.7% were non-families. 24.0% of all households were made up of individuals, and 12% had someone living alone who was 65 years of age or older. The average household size was 2.48 and the average family size was 2.97.

The median age in the town was 44.5 years. 23.6% of residents were under the age of 18; 5.2% were between the ages of 18 and 24; 21.9% were from 25 to 44; 31.9% were from 45 to 64; and 17.2% were 65 years of age or older. The gender makeup of the town was 48.4% male and 51.6% female.

=== 2000 census ===
As of the census of 2000, there were 16,790 people, 6,462 households, and 4,678 families living in the town. The population density was 355.7 inhabitants per square mile (137.3/km^{2}). There were 7,233 housing units at an average density of 151.6 per square mile (58.5/km^{2}). The racial makeup of the town was 97.34% White, 0.38% Black or African American, 0.18% Native American, 1.16% Asian, 0.01% Pacific Islander, 0.17% from other races, and 0.77% from two or more races. Hispanic or Latino of any race were 0.48% of the population.

There were 6,462 households, out of which 35.1% had children under the age of 18 living with them, 62.8% were married couples living together, 7.0% had a female householder with no husband present, and 27.6% were non-families. 20.7% of all households were made up of individuals, and 7.4% had someone living alone who was 65 years of age or older. The average household size was 2.59 and the average family size was 3.02.

In the town, the population was spread out, with 25.9% under the age of 18, 4.9% from 18 to 24, 30.8% from 25 to 44, 25.3% from 45 to 64, and 13.0% who were 65 years of age or older. The median age was 39 years. For every 100 females, there were 95.6 males. For every 100 females age 18 and over, there were 92.2 males.

The median income for a household in the town was $76,491, and the median income for a family was $95,138. Males had a median income of $61,148 versus $31,372 for females. The per capita income for the town was $40,321. About 3.0% of families and 4.0% of the population were below the poverty line, including 2.7% of those under age 18 and 3.0% of those age 65 or over.

== Local government ==
Since October 7, 1969, the town has had a Council-manager government.

== Economy ==
Scarborough is home to the headquarters of Hannaford supermarkets.

== Public schools ==
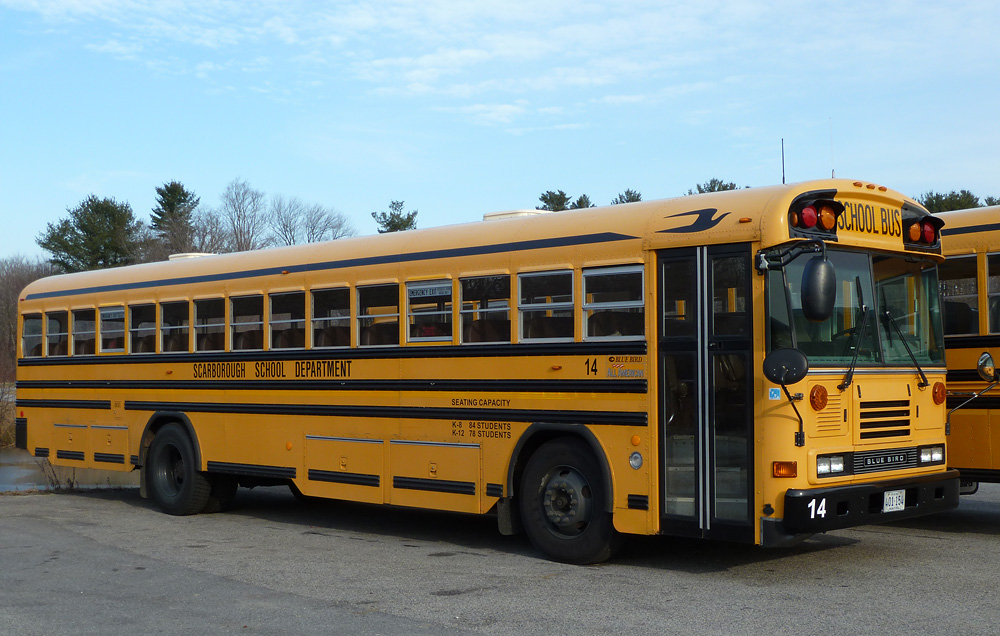
A Scarborough school bus

The town of Scarborough has its own K–12 public school system.

- Scarborough High School
- Scarborough Middle School
- Wentworth Intermediate School
- Eight Corners Primary School
- Pleasant Hill Primary School
- Blue Point Primary School

== Neighborhoods ==
- Blue Point
- Dunstan (known as "West Scarborough" during the railroad era; centered on the intersection of U.S. Route 1 with Broadturn Road and Pine Point Road)
- Eight Corners
- Higgins Beach
- North Scarborough
- Oak Hill (the town center, with town hall and the high school, as well as shopping plazas)
- Pine Point (between the Scarborough Marsh and Saco Bay)
- Pleasant Hill
- Prouts Neck (projects into the Gulf of Maine with its southwest shoreline marking the northeast end of Saco Bay)
- West Scarborough, current name for the northwestern part of the town

== Sites of interest ==
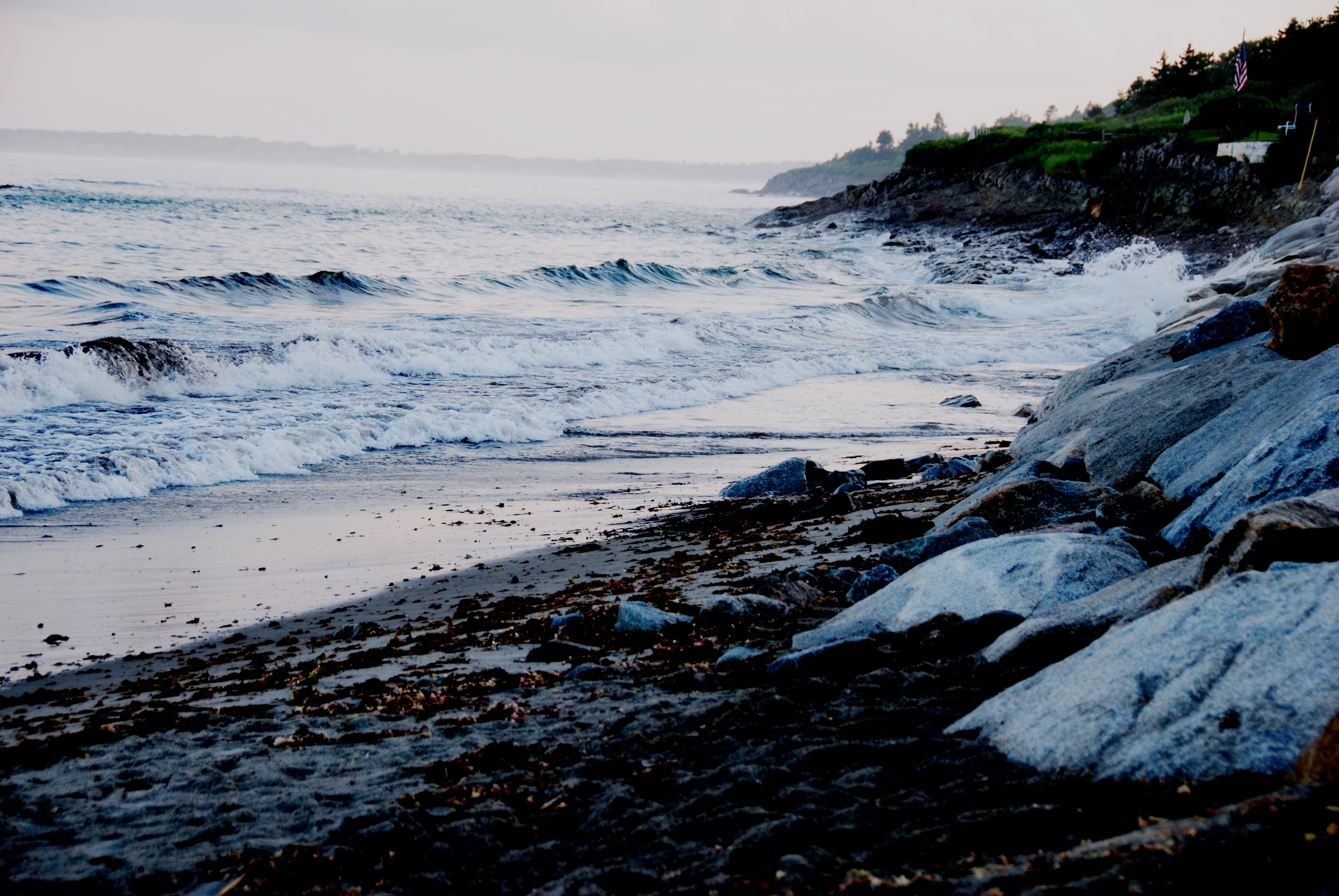
Higgins Beach

- Beech Ridge Motor Speedway
- Hannaford Supermarkets headquarters
- Higgins Beach
- Higgins Beach Market
- Scarborough Beach State Park
- Scarborough Downs
- Scarborough Historical Society & Museum
- Scarborough Marsh
- Scarborough Marsh Audubon Center
- Scarborough Public Library
- Scarborough River Wildlife Sanctuary

== Notable people ==
- Susan Alfond, (born 1946) American investor, philanthropist, and billionaire.
- Kristin Barry, (b. 1973) distance runner
- Frank Bathe, (b 1954) Canadian retired professional ice hockey defenceman for NHL.
- Joe Bessey, (b 1961) NASCAR owner/driver.
- Greg Finley, (b 1984) American actor,
- Linwood M. Higgins, (b 1948) politician from Maine.
- Winslow Homer, (1836–1910) landscape artist, painter and printmaker.
- Erica Jesseman, (b. 1989) distance runner
- Rufus King, (1755–1827) American Founding Father, lawyer, politician, and diplomat. ambassador to Britain
- Stephen King, (b 1947) author of horror, supernatural fiction, suspense, crime, science-fiction, and fantasy novels.
- William King, (1768–1852) American merchant, shipbuilder, army officer and first governor of Maine
- Kelly Moore, (b 1959) American stock car racing driver
- Ryan Moore, (b 1983) American stock car racing driver
- Kelly Noonan Murphy (born 1974 or 1975), American politician
- Wyatt Omsberg, (b 1995) professional soccer player MLS.
- Erin Pearl, (b 1982) competitive figure skater.
- Daniel R. Warren, state legislator and baseball coach
