= Maine State Route 115 =

State highway in Cumberland County, Maine, US

State Route 115

Route information
- Maintained by MaineDOT
- Length: 18.02 mi (29.00 km)

Major junctions
- West end: US 302 / SR 35 in North Windham
- US 202 / SR 4 at Windham/Gray town line; I-95 / Maine Turnpike in Gray; US 202 / SR 4 / SR 26 / SR 100 in Gray; SR 231 in North Yarmouth; SR 9 in North Yarmouth
- East end: SR 88 in Yarmouth

Location
- Country: United States
- State: Maine
- Counties: Cumberland

Highway system
- Maine State Highway System; Interstate; US; State; Auto trails; Lettered highways
← SR 114	→ SR 116

State Route 115 (SR 115) is a state highway in southern Maine, United States. It runs west to east for just over 18 miles (29 km), from U.S. Route 302 (US 302) and SR 35 in North Windham to SR 88 in Yarmouth.

== Route description ==
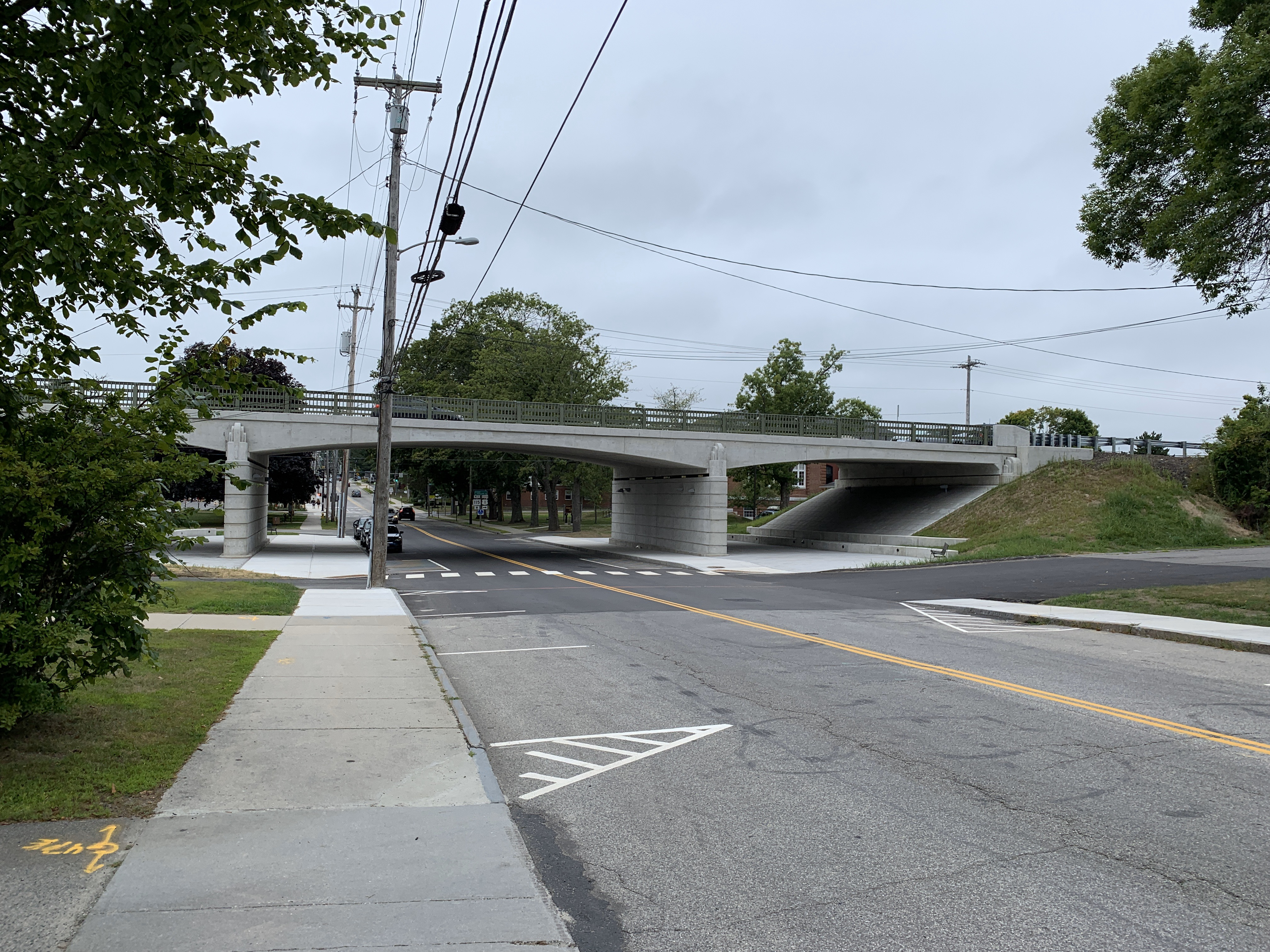
SR 115 (Main Street) in Yarmouth, looking west toward the US 1 overpass

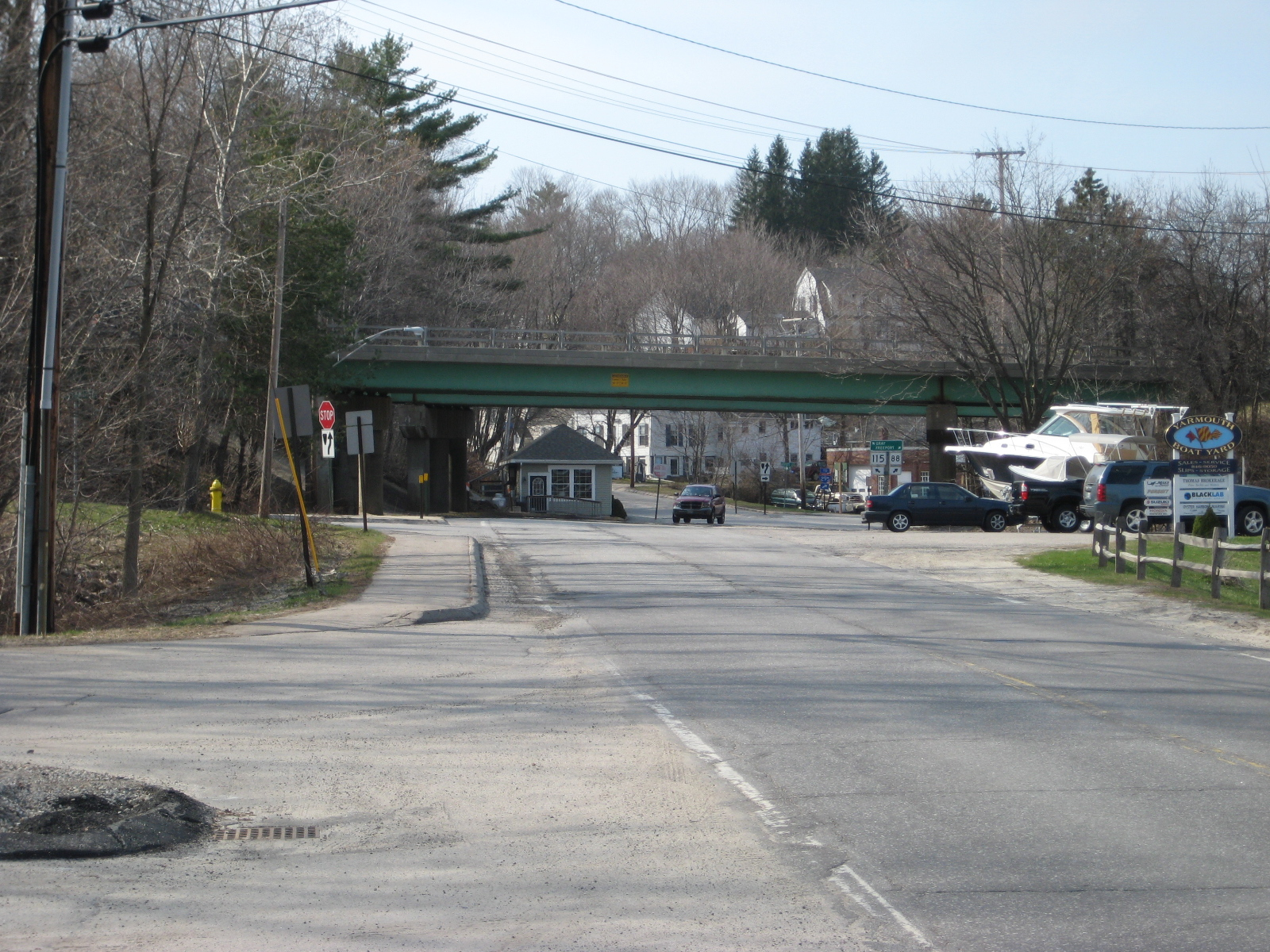
The eastern terminus of SR 115 in Yarmouth, is visible under the I-295 overpass

SR 115 serves as the primary entrance to North Windham village from the east. Within North Windham, it crosses a bridge over Ditch Brook marking the location of a terminal moraine formerly containing Little Sebago Lake until destroyed by a flood on June 4, 1814. SR 115 becomes concurrent with US 202/SR 4 at the Gray town line and parallels the west bank of the Pleasant River through West Gray until reaching Gray village after an interchange with Interstate 95 (I-95) / Maine Turnpike. SR 115 separates from US 202 as the easterly road of the five-way intersection at Gray village and proceeds southeasterly paralleling the west bank of the Royal River through Walnut Hill in North Yarmouth, where it is known as Gray Road. SR 115 is known as West Main Street as it enters the town of Yarmouth, crossing the Maine Central Railroad Back Road and Lower Road a short distance northeast of their separation at Royal Junction.

== Major intersections ==
The entire route is in Cumberland County.

Location	mi	km	Destinations	Notes
Windham	0.00	0.00	US 302 (Roosevelt Trail) / SR 35 (Tandberg Trail) – Standish, Portland, Raymond	
Windham–Gray line	2.98	4.80	US 202 west / SR 4 south (Gray Road) – Windham, Gorham	Southern end of US 202/SR 4 concurrency
Gray	6.30– 6.60	10.14– 10.62	I-95 / Maine Turnpike – Portland, Kittery, Lewiston, Augusta	Exit 63 (I-95)
Gray	6.33	10.19	SR 26A north – South Paris, Poland Spring, Bethel	Western end of SR 26A concurrency
Gray	6.75– 6.77	10.86– 10.90	US 202 east / SR 4 north (Main Street) / SR 26A ends – Auburn; SR 26 / SR 100 (Portland Road) – Portland	Eastern end of US 202/SR 4/SR 26A concurrency; southern terminus of SR 26A
North Yarmouth	12.35	19.88	SR 231 north (New Gloucester Road) – New Gloucester	Southern terminus of SR 231
North Yarmouth	13.53	21.77	SR 9 north (Memorial Highway) – Pownal	Northern end of SR 9 concurrency
North Yarmouth	13.76	22.14	SR 9 south (Cumberland Road) – Cumberland	Southern end of SR 9 concurrency
Yarmouth	17.47– 17.60	28.12– 28.32	US 1 / Cleaves Street / School Street / York Street – Brunswick, Portland	Interchange
Yarmouth	18.02	29.00	SR 88 (Lafayette Street) – Freeport, Falmouth Foreside	
1.000 mi = 1.609 km; 1.000 km = 0.621 mi: Concurrency terminus; Tolled
