= Little Falls-South Windham, Maine =

- Census-designated place
- Location within the state of Maine
- Coordinates: 43°43′54″N 70°25′13″W
- Country: United States
- State: Maine
- County: Cumberland

Area
  - Total: 2.5 sq mi (6.5 km^{2})
  - Land: 2.4 sq mi (6.1 km^{2})
  - Water: 0.12 sq mi (0.3 km^{2})

Population (2000)
  - Total: 1,792
  - Density: 755/sq mi (291.5/km^{2})
- Time zone: UTC-5 (Eastern (EST))
  - Summer (DST): UTC-4 (EDT)
- Area code: 207
- FIPS code: 23-40367

Little Falls-South Windham was a census-designated place (CDP) in Cumberland County, Maine, United States defined for the 2000 census. The population of the CDP was 1,792 at the time. Because of new CDP guidelines for 2010, the CDP has been split into two CDPs: Little Falls and South Windham.

It is part of the Portland–South Portland–Biddeford, Maine Metropolitan Statistical Area.

== Geography ==
Little Falls-South Windham is located at 43°43′54″N 70°25′13″W (43.731790, -70.420378).

According to the United States Census Bureau, the CDP had a total area of 2.5 square miles (6.5 km^{2}), of which 2.4 square miles (6.2 km^{2}) was land and 0.1 square miles (0.26 km^{2}), or 5.18%, was water.

It was divided between the towns of Gorham (the Little Falls side) and Windham (the South Windham side), and straddles the Presumpscot River.

== Demographics ==
As of the census of 2000, there were 1,792 people, 491 households, and 341 families residing in the CDP. The population density was 754.9 inhabitants per square mile (291.5/km^{2}). There were 521 housing units at an average density of 219.5 per square mile (84.7/km^{2}). The racial makeup of the CDP was 95.93% White, 1.67% African American, 0.84% Native American, 0.33% Asian, 0.06% Pacific Islander, 0.06% from other races, and 1.12% from two or more races. Hispanic or Latino of any race were 0.78% of the population.

There were 491 households, out of which 35.8% had children under the age of 18 living with them, 51.3% were married couples living together, 14.7% had a female householder with no husband present, and 30.5% were non-families. 21.8% of all households were made up of individuals, and 6.1% had someone living alone who was 65 years of age or older. The average household size was 2.53 and the average family size was 2.98.

In the CDP the population was spread out, with 18.3% under the age of 18, 13.8% from 18 to 24, 43.1% from 25 to 44, 17.6% from 45 to 64, and 7.2% who were 65 years of age or older. The median age was 34 years. For every 100 females, there were 163.9 males. For every 100 females age 18 and over, there were 183.2 males.

The median income for a household in the CDP was $42,639, and the median income for a family was $50,500. Males had a median income of $32,000 versus $21,983 for females. The per capita income for the CDP was $14,377. About 2.6% of families and 5.2% of the population were below the poverty line, including 4.3% of those under age 18 and none of those age 65 or over.
