= Mr. Maine Basketball =

High school basketball award in Maine, United States

The Mr. Maine Basketball honor recognizes the top high school basketball player in the state of Maine. The award is presented annually by the Maine Association of Basketball Coaches. The award is given to a senior player who best demonstrates basketball skills, makes significant impact on his team, shows leadership and respect for the game, and demonstrates good sportsmanship and citizenship both on and off the court. The annual selection is made by a 5-person committee composed of three media representatives and two retired coaches.

== Award winners ==
Year	Player	High School	College	NBA/ABA draft
2026	Nolan Ames	Camden Hills	Bentley	
2025	Jamier Rose	Noble	SNHU	
2024	Chance Mercier	Ellsworth High School	Southern Maine CC	
2023	Will Davies	Thornton Academy	Saint Anselm	
2022	John Shea	Edward Little	Maine	
2021	Cash McClure	Maranacook Community High School	Bentley University	
2020	Bryce Lausier	Hampden Academy	Saint Anselm College / Maine / University of Southern Maine	
2019	Matt Fleming	Bangor High School	United States Military Academy	
2018	Terion Moss	Portland High School	Maine \ University of Maine at Farmington	
2017	Matt McDevitt	Greely High School	Endicott College	
2016	Nick Gilpin	Hampden Academy	Bates College	
2015	Kyle Bouchard	Houlton High School	Bentley University	
2014	Dustin Cole	Bonny Eagle High School	Franklin Pierce University	
2013	Garet Beal	Jonesport-Beals High School	Maine	
2012	Christian McCue	Hampden Academy	McGill / University of Southern Maine	
2011	Tyler McFarland	Camden Hills	Bentley (2012)	
2010	Indiana Faithful	Cheverus	Wofford	
2009	Thomas Knight	Dirigo	Notre Dame	
2008	Ryan Martin	Maranacook	Maine\Keene St.	
2007	Troy Barnies	Edward Little	Maine	
2006	Bryant Barr	Falmouth	Davidson	
2005	Tyler Emmons	Portland	Lynn\Caldwell	
2004	Ralph Mims	Brunswick	Florida St.	
2003	Zak Ray	Bangor	Bates	
2002	Nik Caner-Medley	Deering	Maryland	
2001	Jamaal Caterina	Deering	American\New Hampshire\Southern Maine	
2000	Chris Markwood	South Portland	Notre Dame\Maine	
1999	Robert Pilsbury	Portland	Husson	
1998	Austin Ganly	Greely	New Hampshire	
1997	Mike Mastropaolo	Falmouth	Bentley	
1996	T.J. Caouette	Winthrop	Villanova	
1995	Josh Nash	Medomak Valley	Maine	
1994	Bob Davies	Old Orchard Beach	Maine-Fort Kent	
1993	Matt Arsenault	Old Town	St. Joseph's	
1992	Keith Gendron	Sanford		
1991	Matt Gaudet	Mountain Valley	Colby	
1990	Mike Adams	Mount Blue	Thomas College	
1989	Raymond Alley	Vinalhaven	Husson	
1988	Tim Scott	Ellsworth High School	Maine (Baseball)	

=== Schools with multiple winners ===
School	Number of Awards	Years
Hampden	3	2012, 2016, 2020
Portland	3	1999, 2005, 2018
Camden Hills	2	2011, 2026
Deering	2	2001, 2002
Edward Little	2	2007, 2022
Falmouth	2	1997, 2006
Maranacook	2	2008, 2021

=== Colleges with multiple winners ===
College	Number of Awards	Years
Maine	9	1988, 1995, 2000, 2007, 2008, 2013, 2018, 2020, 2022
Bentley	4	1997, 2011, 2015, 2021
Southern Maine	3	2001, 2012, 2020
Bates	2	2003, 2016
Colby	2	1991, 2026
Husson	2	1989, 1999
New Hampshire	2	1998, 2001
Notre Dame	2	2000, 2009
Saint Anselm	2	2020, 2023

== See also ==
- Miss Maine Basketball
