= Mike Timmons =

American school administrator and politician

Michael J. Timmons is an American school administrator and politician.

Prior to his political career, Timmons was a high school principal in Windham, Maine as well as a business teacher. He became president of the Cumberland Fair in 2006. Timmons contested Steve Moriarty's open seat on the Maine House of Representatives in 2014, defeating Dale Denno. He lost a 2016 reelection bid to Denno. Paul LePage considered Timmons for a position on the board of Lands for Maine's Future in 2017, which Timmons declined.
