= Miss Maine Basketball =

Maine basketball award

The Miss Maine Basketball honor recognizes the best female high school basketball player in the state of Maine. The award is presented annually by the Maine Association of Basketball Coaches. The award is given to a senior player who best demonstrates basketball skills, makes significant impact on her team, shows leadership and respect for the game, and demonstrates good sportsmanship and citizenship both on and off the court. The annual selection is made by a 5-person committee composed of three media representatives and two retired coaches.

== Award winners ==
Year	Player	High School	College	WNBA Draft
2026	Maddie Provost	Lawrence	Holy Cross	
2025	Madelynn Deprey	Caribou	Southern New Hampshire	
2024	Madigan Fitzpatrick	Cheverus	Maine	
2023	Lizzy Gruber	Gardiner	Saint Joseph's	
2022	Jaycie Christopher	Skowhegan	Maine	
2021	Emily Archibald	Kennebunk	Providence	
2020	Julia Colby	Oxford Hills	Southern New Hampshire	
2019	Anna DeWolfe	Greely	Fordham	
2018	Kolleen Bouchard	Houlton	Bentley	
2017	Emily Esposito	Gorham	Villanova University	
2016	Nia Irving	Lawrence	Boston University	
2015	Ashley Storey	Greely	New Hampshire	
2014	Allie Clement	Catherine McAuley	Marist College	
2013	Martha Veroneau	Waynflete School		
2012	Alexa Coulombe	Catherine McAuley	Boston College	
2011	Kayla Burchilil	Deering	Vermont	
2010	Christy Manning	Scarborough	College of the Holy Cross	
2009	Morgan Frame	Waterville	Saint Anselm/New Hampshire	
2008	Rachael Mack	Cony	Colby	
2007	Ashley Cimino	Catherine McAuley	Stanford	
2006	Kayla Parker	Sanford	Assumption	
2005	Kate Rollins	Cony	Harvard	
2004	Erika Stupinski	Mt. Ararat	Stonehill	
2003	Bracey Barker	Mount Desert Island	Maine	
2002	Lanna Martin	Calais	Saint Anselm	
2001	Morgan DiPietro	Greely	Bentley	
2000	Heather Ernest	Mount Blue	Maine	
1999	Lynn Girouard	Lewiston	Central Maine C.C.	
1998	Andrea Pardilla	Old Town	Maine	
1997	Kim Condon	Presque Isle	Colby	
1996	Amy Vachon	Cony	Maine	
1995	Allison Booth	Kennebunk	Boston College	
1994	Cindy Blodgett	Lawrence	Maine	1998 Round: 1 / Pick: 6
1993	Trisha Ripton	Stearns	Maine	
1992	Valerie Brown	Edward Little		
1991	Rita Sullivan	Bangor	Maine	
1990	Christina Strong	Georges Valley		
1989	Stephanie Carter	Schenck		
1988	Julie Bradstreet	Central	Maine	

=== Schools with multiple winners ===
School	Number of Awards	Years
Cony	3	2008, 2005, 1996
Greely	3	2019, 2015, 2001
McAuley	2	2012, 2007
Kennebunk	2	1995, 2021

== See also ==
- Mr. Maine Basketball
