= Windham High School =

Windham High School is the name of several high schools in the United States:

- Windham High School (Connecticut) in Windham, Connecticut
- Windham High School (Maine) in Windham, Maine
- Windham High School (Ohio) in Windham, Ohio
- Windham High School (New Hampshire) in Windham, New Hampshire
