= Maplewood Farm =

Maplewood Farm may refer to:

- Maplewood Farm (South Windham, Maine), listed on the National Register of Historic Places (NRHP)
- Maplewood Farm (Spring Hill, Tennessee), also NRHP-listed

== See also ==
- Rascoe-Harris Farm, also known as "Maplewood Farm"
