= William J. Garsoe =

American politician

Member of the Maine House of Representatives (District 25)
- In office 1973–1980
- Succeeded by: Robert G. Dillenback

Personal details
- Party: Republican
- Spouse: Barbara Blanchard
- Education: University of Maine

William J. Garsoe (December 9, 1917 – May 23, 1986) was an American politician from Maine. Garsoe, a Republican, served four terms (1973 to 1980) in the Maine House of Representatives from the town of Cumberland. During his third term in office, Garsoe was elected Assistant Minority Leader. During his fourth and final term, Garsoe was Minority Leader.

Garsoe served in the Air Corps as Captain during World War II. Garsoe raised carnations as the owner of Sunnyside Greenhouses from 1946 to 1972.
