= Little Falls, Maine =

- Census-designated place
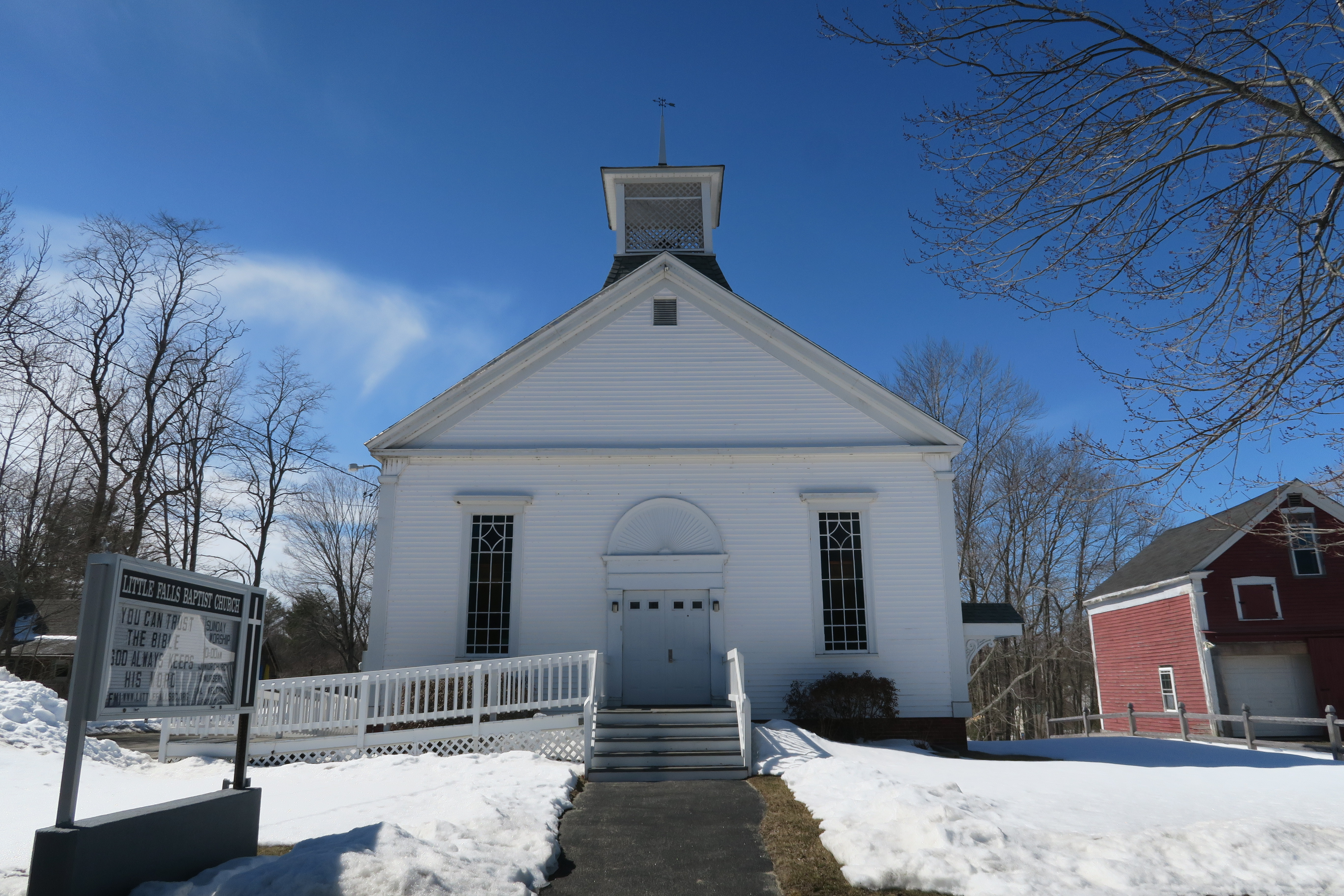
- Little Falls Baptist Church

- Location in Cumberland County and the state of Maine
- Coordinates: 43°43′52″N 70°25′48″W
- Country: United States
- State: Maine
- County: Cumberland
- Town: Gorham

Area
  - Total: 1.25 sq mi (3.23 km^{2})
  - Land: 1.15 sq mi (2.98 km^{2})
  - Water: 0.097 sq mi (0.25 km^{2})
- Elevation: 128 ft (39 m)

Population (2020)
  - Total: 863
  - Density: 750.1/sq mi (289.63/km^{2})
- Time zone: UTC-5 (Eastern (EST))
  - Summer (DST): UTC-4 (EDT)
- ZIP Code: 04038 (Gorham)
- Area code: 207
- FIPS code: 23-40350
- GNIS feature ID: 2583559

Little Falls is a census-designated place (CDP) in the town of Gorham in Cumberland County, Maine, United States. As of the 2020 census, Little Falls had a population of 863. Prior to 2010, Little Falls was part of the Little Falls-South Windham census-designated place.

It is part of the Portland–South Portland–Biddeford, Maine Metropolitan Statistical Area.

== Geography ==
Little Falls is located along the Presumpscot River. According to the United States Census Bureau, the CDP has a total area of 1.2 square miles (3.2 km^{2}), of which 1.2 square miles (3.0 km^{2}) is land and 0.12 square miles (0.3 km^{2}), or 7.87%, is water.

The CDP of South Windham is located directly across the Presumpscot River, in the town of Windham. U.S. Route 202 and Maine State Route 4 run north-south in a concurrency through both communities.

== Demographics ==
Historical population
Census	Pop.	Note	%±
2020	863		—
U.S. Decennial Census
