= Cumberland Center, Maine =

Census-designated place in Maine, United States

- Census-designated place
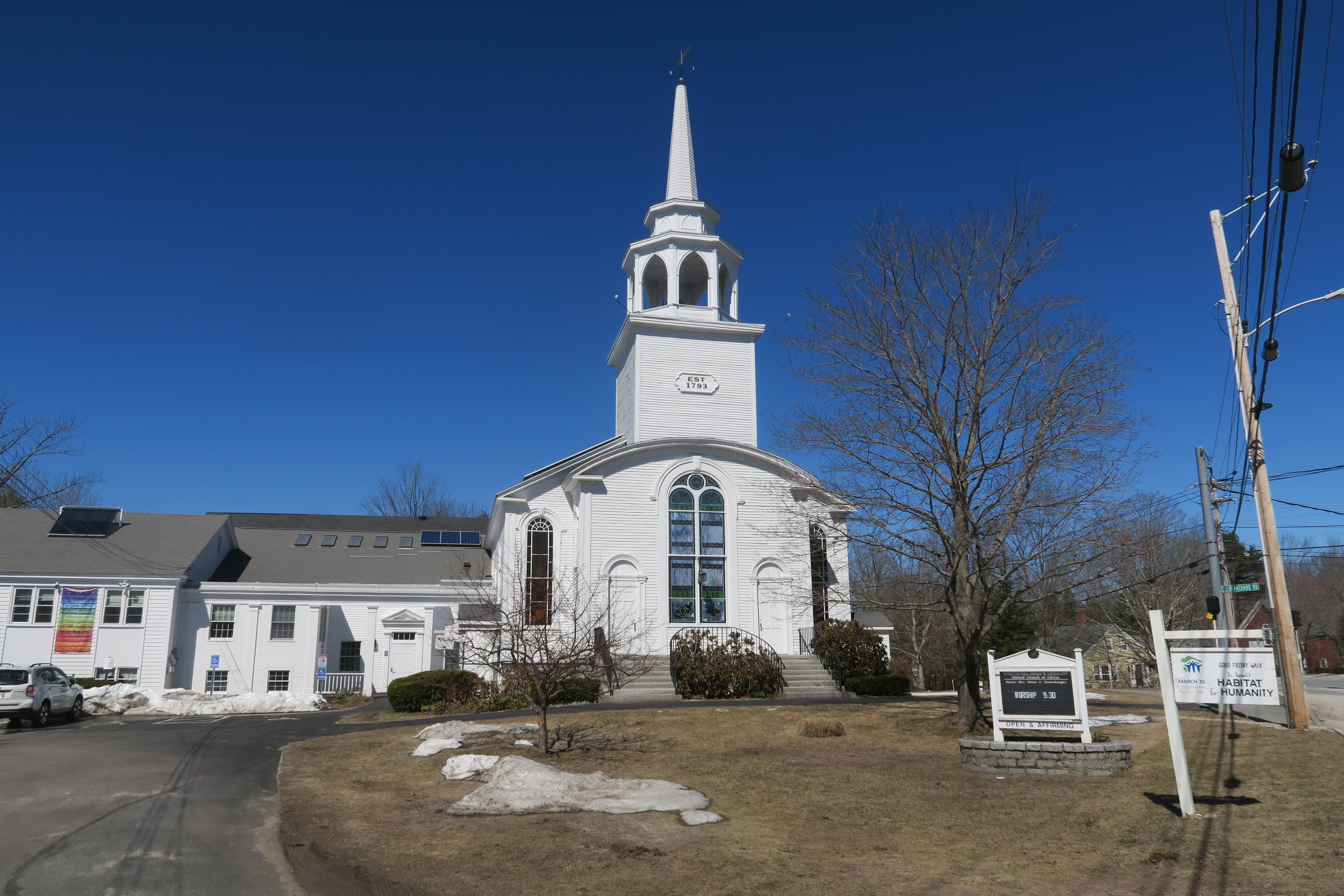
- Congregational Church in Cumberland

- Location in Cumberland County and the state of Maine
- Coordinates: 43°47′52″N 70°14′56″W
- Country: United States
- State: Maine
- County: Cumberland
- Town: Cumberland

Area
  - Total: 4.24 sq mi (10.97 km^{2})
  - Land: 4.23 sq mi (10.96 km^{2})
  - Water: 0.0039 sq mi (0.01 km^{2})
- Elevation: 184 ft (56 m)

Population (2020)
  - Total: 2,739
  - Density: 647.4/sq mi (249.95/km^{2})
- Time zone: UTC-5 (Eastern (EST))
  - Summer (DST): UTC-4 (EDT)
- ZIP code: 04021
- Area code: 207
- FIPS code: 23-15500
- GNIS feature ID: 2377900

Cumberland Center is a census-designated place (CDP) within the town of Cumberland in Cumberland County, Maine, United States. As of the 2020 census, Cumberland Center had a population of 2,739. It is part of the Portland – South Portland – Biddeford, Maine, Metropolitan Statistical Area.

== Geography ==
According to the United States Census Bureau, the CDP has a total area of 4.2 square miles (11 km^{2}), all land.

== Demographics ==
Historical population
Census	Pop.	Note	%±
2020	2,739		—
U.S. Decennial Census

=== 2020 census ===
As of the 2020 census, Cumberland Center had a population of 2,739. The median age was 45.6 years. 25.0% of residents were under the age of 18 and 19.0% of residents were 65 years of age or older. For every 100 females there were 92.3 males, and for every 100 females age 18 and over there were 90.4 males age 18 and over.

0.0% of residents lived in urban areas, while 100.0% lived in rural areas.

There were 1,073 households in Cumberland Center, of which 36.7% had children under the age of 18 living in them. Of all households, 63.7% were married-couple households, 10.5% were households with a male householder and no spouse or partner present, and 22.7% were households with a female householder and no spouse or partner present. About 20.4% of all households were made up of individuals and 12.1% had someone living alone who was 65 years of age or older.

There were 1,091 housing units, of which 1.6% were vacant. The homeowner vacancy rate was 0.4% and the rental vacancy rate was 0.7%.

Racial composition as of the 2020 census
Race	Number	Percent
White	2,577	94.1%
Black or African American	14	0.5%
American Indian and Alaska Native	2	0.1%
Asian	28	1.0%
Native Hawaiian and Other Pacific Islander	3	0.1%
Some other race	5	0.2%
Two or more races	110	4.0%
Hispanic or Latino (of any race)	48	1.8%

=== 2000 census ===
As of the census of 2000, there were 2,596 people, 891 households, and 744 families residing in the CDP. The population density was 612.2 inhabitants per square mile (236.4/km^{2}). There were 904 housing units at an average density of 213.2 per square mile (82.3/km^{2}). The racial makeup of the CDP was 99.00% White, 0.15% African American, 0.12% Native American, 0.42% Asian, 0.12% from other races, and 0.19% from two or more races. Hispanic or Latino of any race were 0.42% of the population.

There were 891 households, out of which 49.5% had children under the age of 18 living with them, 73.1% were married couples living together, 8.0% had a female householder with no husband present, and 16.4% were non-families. 14.0% of all households were made up of individuals, and 7.0% had someone living alone who was 65 years of age or older. The average household size was 2.91 and the average family size was 3.22.

In the CDP, the population was spread out, with 33.9% under the age of 18, 2.7% from 18 to 24, 29.2% from 25 to 44, 24.1% from 45 to 64, and 10.2% who were 65 years of age or older. The median age was 38 years. For every 100 females, there were 92.3 males. For every 100 females age 18 and over, there were 86.8 males.

The median income for a household in the CDP was $66,950, and the median income for a family was $72,632. Males had a median income of $47,975 versus $40,125 for females. The per capita income for the CDP was $32,043. About 2.3% of families and 2.0% of the population were below the poverty line, including 2.0% of those under age 18 and 4.2% of those age 65 or over.

== School system ==
The Greely school system comprises five schools which teach grades K–12. Greely High School has a student body composed of 2001 students in grades 9–12.
