= Brunswick station =

Brunswick Station may refer to one of the following places:

Australia

- Brunswick railway station, Melbourne
- Brunswick Junction railway station, Western Australia
- Fortitude Valley railway station, Brisbane, formerly known as Brunswick Street railway station

United Kingdom

- Brunswick railway station, Liverpool

United States

- Brunswick Nuclear Generating Station in North Carolina
- Brunswick Station, Maine, a census-designated place
  - Naval Air Station Brunswick
- Brunswick station (Maine), a train station in Maine
- Brunswick station (Maryland), a train station in Maryland
