= North Windham, Maine =

- Census-designated place
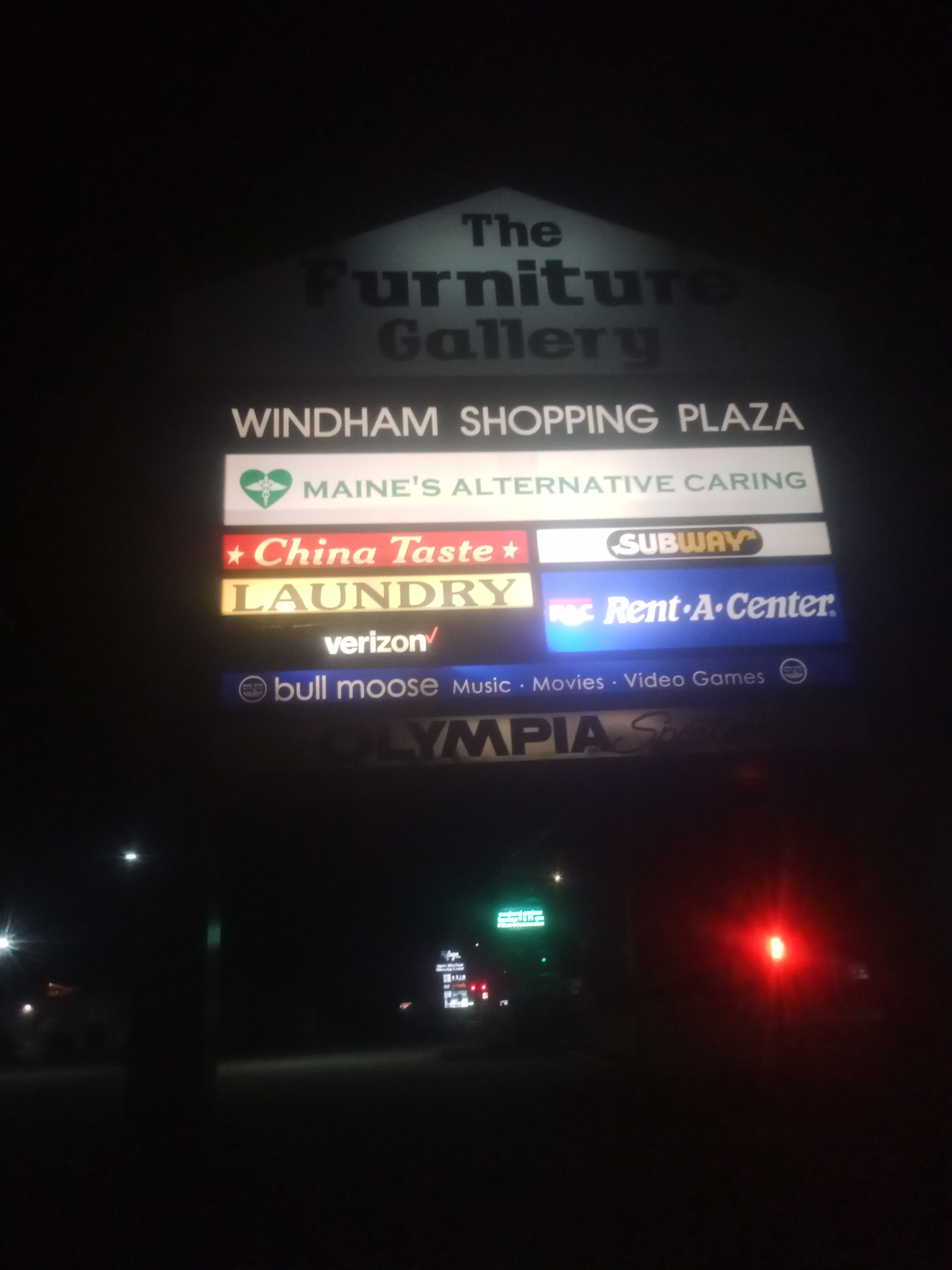
- Shopping center in North Windham, ME.

- Location in Cumberland County and the state of Maine
- Coordinates: 43°49′24″N 70°25′45″W
- Country: United States
- State: Maine
- County: Cumberland
- Town: Windham

Area
  - Total: 6.94 sq mi (17.98 km^{2})
  - Land: 6.73 sq mi (17.42 km^{2})
  - Water: 0.22 sq mi (0.56 km^{2})
- Elevation: 276 ft (84 m)

Population (2020)
  - Total: 5,274
  - Density: 784.1/sq mi (302.74/km^{2})
- Time zone: UTC−5 (Eastern (EST))
  - Summer (DST): UTC−4 (EDT)
- ZIP Code: 04062
- Area code: 207
- FIPS code: 23-53685
- GNIS feature ID: 2377943

North Windham is a census-designated place (CDP) within the town of Windham in Cumberland County, Maine, United States. North Windham is included in the Lewiston-Auburn, Maine metropolitan New England City and Town Area. As of the 2020 census, North Windham had a population of 5,274. It is part of the Portland–South Portland–Biddeford, Maine Metropolitan Statistical Area.

== Geography ==
North Windham is located between Sebago Lake's Jordan Bay to the West, and Little Sebago Lake to the East.

According to the United States Census Bureau, the CDP has a total area of 6.8 square miles (17.5 km^{2}), of which 6.5 square miles (16.9 km^{2}) is land and 0.23 square miles (0.6 km^{2}), or 3.22%, is water.

== Demographics ==
Historical population
Census	Pop.	Note	%±
2020	5,274		—
U.S. Decennial Census

=== 2020 census ===
As of the 2020 census, North Windham had a population of 5,274. The median age was 42.9 years. 19.8% of residents were under the age of 18 and 19.3% of residents were 65 years of age or older. For every 100 females there were 89.1 males, and for every 100 females age 18 and over there were 86.3 males age 18 and over.

85.3% of residents lived in urban areas, while 14.7% lived in rural areas.

There were 2,177 households in North Windham, of which 26.6% had children under the age of 18 living in them. Of all households, 51.8% were married-couple households, 12.4% were households with a male householder and no spouse or partner present, and 25.8% were households with a female householder and no spouse or partner present. About 23.7% of all households were made up of individuals and 10.6% had someone living alone who was 65 years of age or older.

There were 2,379 housing units, of which 8.5% were vacant. The homeowner vacancy rate was 0.1% and the rental vacancy rate was 6.6%.

Racial composition as of the 2020 census
Race	Number	Percent
White	4,794	90.9%
Black or African American	91	1.7%
American Indian and Alaska Native	26	0.5%
Asian	76	1.4%
Native Hawaiian and Other Pacific Islander	0	0.0%
Some other race	31	0.6%
Two or more races	256	4.9%
Hispanic or Latino (of any race)	85	1.6%

=== 2000 census ===
As of the census of 2000, there were 4,568 people, 1,773 households, and 1,297 families residing in the CDP. The population density was 657.5 inhabitants per square mile (253.9/km^{2}). There were 1,890 housing units at an average density of 272.0 per square mile (105.0/km^{2}). The racial makeup of the CDP was 98.14% White, 0.55% African American, 0.39% Native American, 0.28% Asian, 0.02% from other races, and 0.61% from two or more races. Hispanic or Latino of any race were 0.33% of the population.

There were 1,773 households, out of which 38.0% had children under the age of 18 living with them, 58.4% were married couples living together, 11.9% had a female householder with no husband present, and 26.8% were non-families. 21.0% of all households were made up of individuals, and 8.1% had someone living alone who was 65 years of age or older. The average household size was 2.57 and the average family size was 2.97.

In the CDP, the age distribution of the population shows 26.7% under the age of 18, 6.1% from 18 to 24, 31.8% from 25 to 44, 25.2% from 45 to 64, and 10.2% who were 65 years of age or older. The median age was 36 years. For every 100 females, there were 89.2 males. For every 100 females age 18 and over, there were 87.3 males.

The median income for a household in the CDP was $44,395, and the median income for a family was $51,111. Males had a median income of $32,417 versus $25,635 for females. The per capita income for the CDP was $19,566. About 4.4% of families and 5.4% of the population were below the poverty line, including 6.9% of those under age 18 and 9.8% of those age 65 or over.

== Camp ==
Center Day Camp, a day camp run by the Jewish Community Alliance of Southern Maine, is located in North Windham.

== Notable person ==
- Willard Mains, pitcher for four teams; born in North Windham

== Incidents ==
On August 15th, 2025, a shooting occurred in North Windham.
