= Knight's Pond Preserve =

Park in Maine, United States

Coordinates: 43.8212°N 70.2644°W

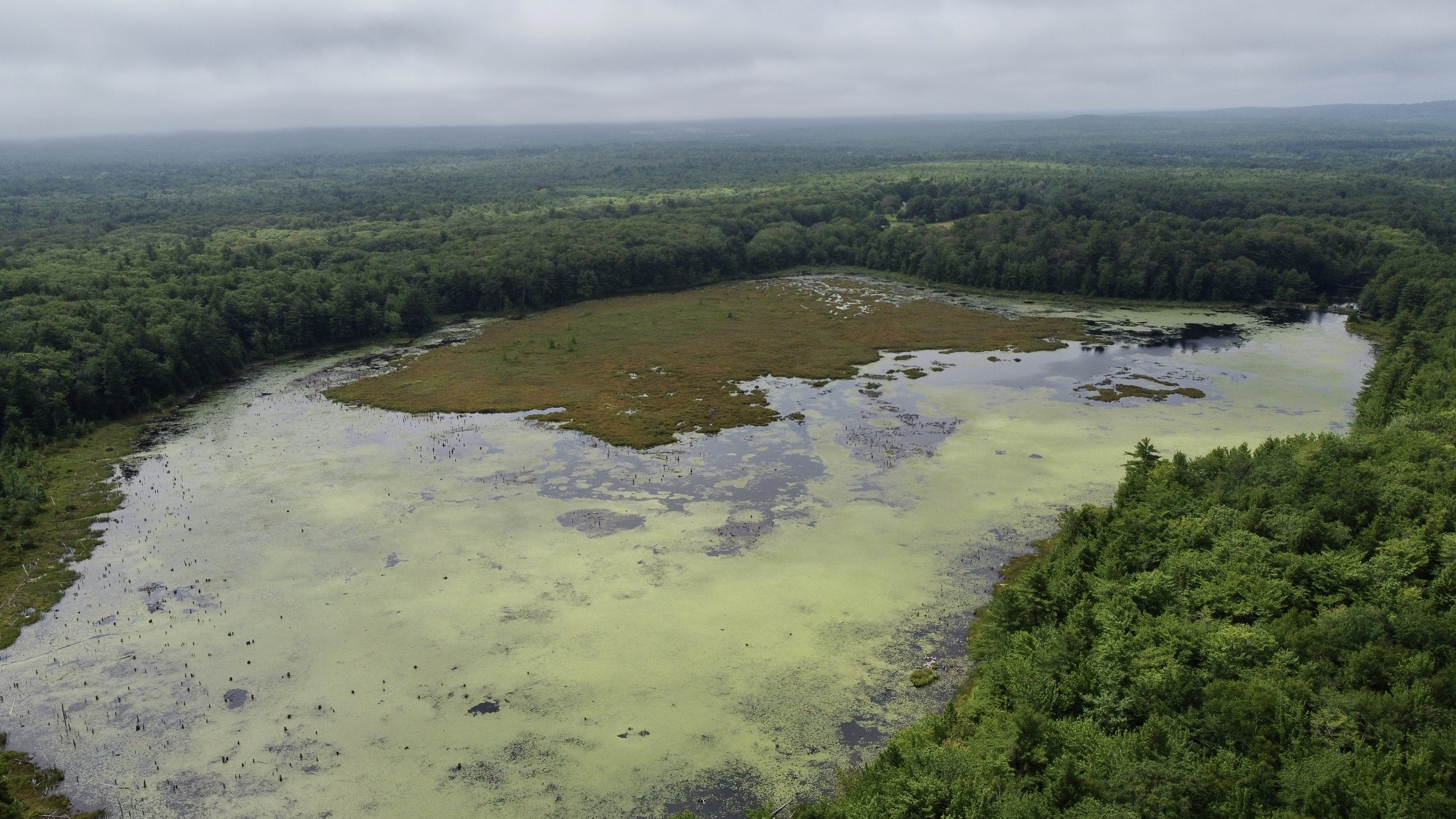
- An aerial view of Knight's Pond from the northern corner. The dam and picnic area are visible at the pond's back right corner.
- Interactive map of Knight's Pond Preserve
- Location: Cumberland and North Yarmouth, Maine
- Area: 213 acres (86 ha)
- Created: 2015
- Operator: Town of Cumberland and the Chebeague and Cumberland Land Trust

Knight's Pond Preserve is a nature preserve and public park located in Cumberland and North Yarmouth, Maine, United States.

== Geography and usage ==
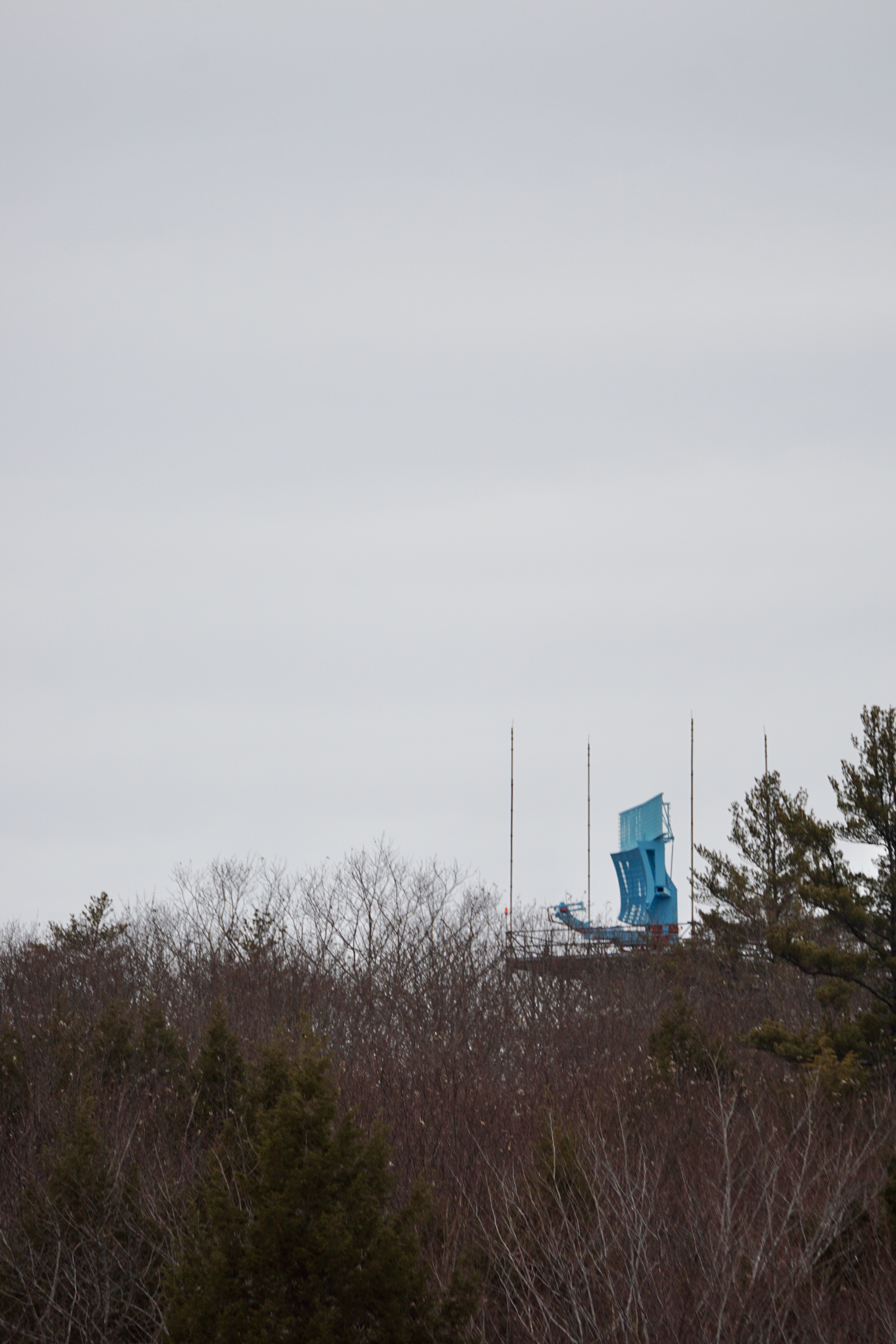
The radar tower on top of Blueberry Hill.

With a total size of 213 acres, it is the largest undeveloped single property in Cumberland, and is managed by the Town of Cumberland and the Chebeague and Cumberland Land Trust. Since its introduction as a managed public park in 2015, the park has seen increased use including walking, hiking, mountain biking, fishing, hunting, snowshoeing, cross country skiing, and ice skating. The preserve is also home to Blueberry Hill, which hosts an FAA ASR-11 radar tower used to monitor air traffic in the area surrounding Portland, Maine.

== History ==
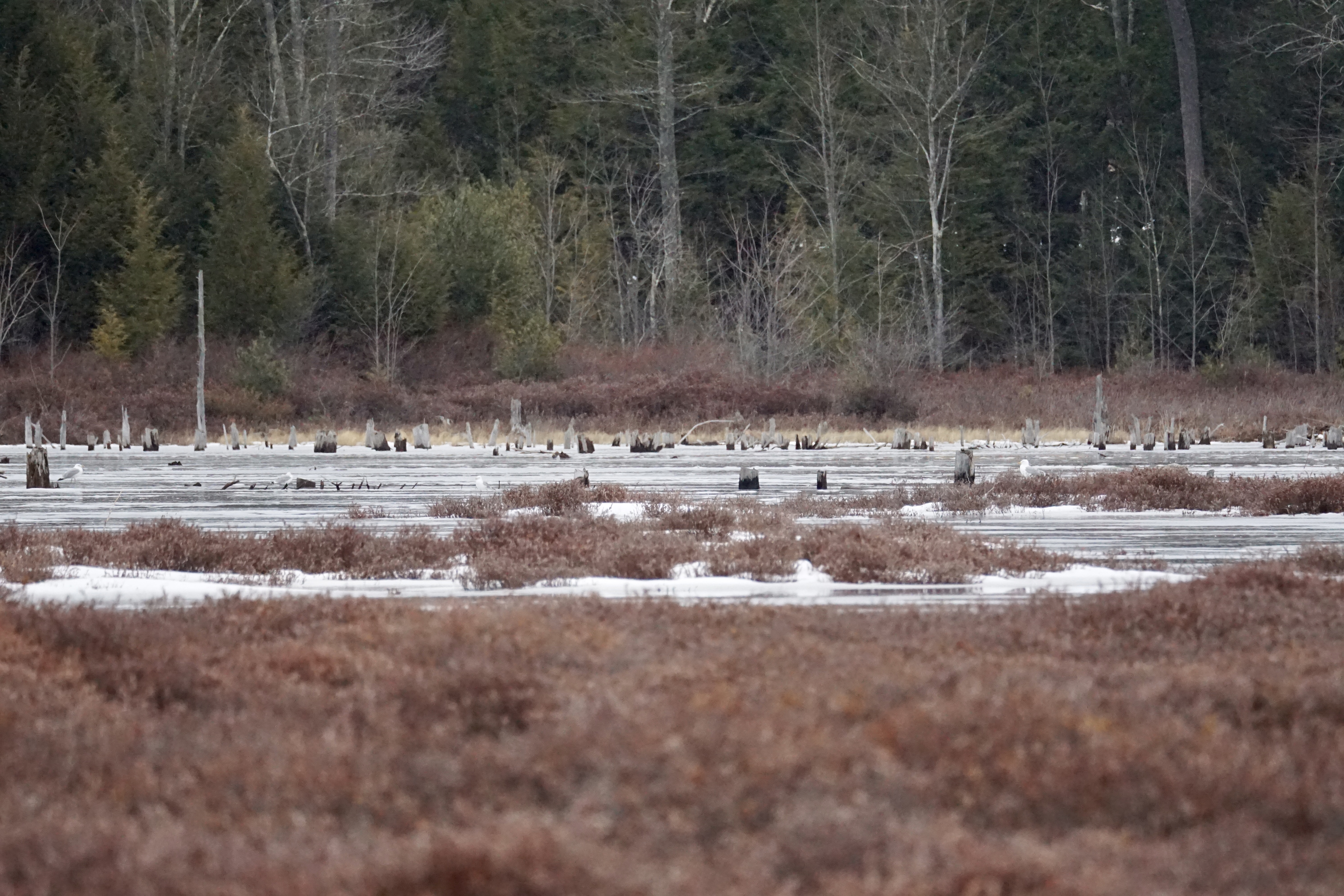
A view across the frozen pond in winter. Several dead trees are visible inside the pond's limits in the once-forested area that was flooded in the 1950s.

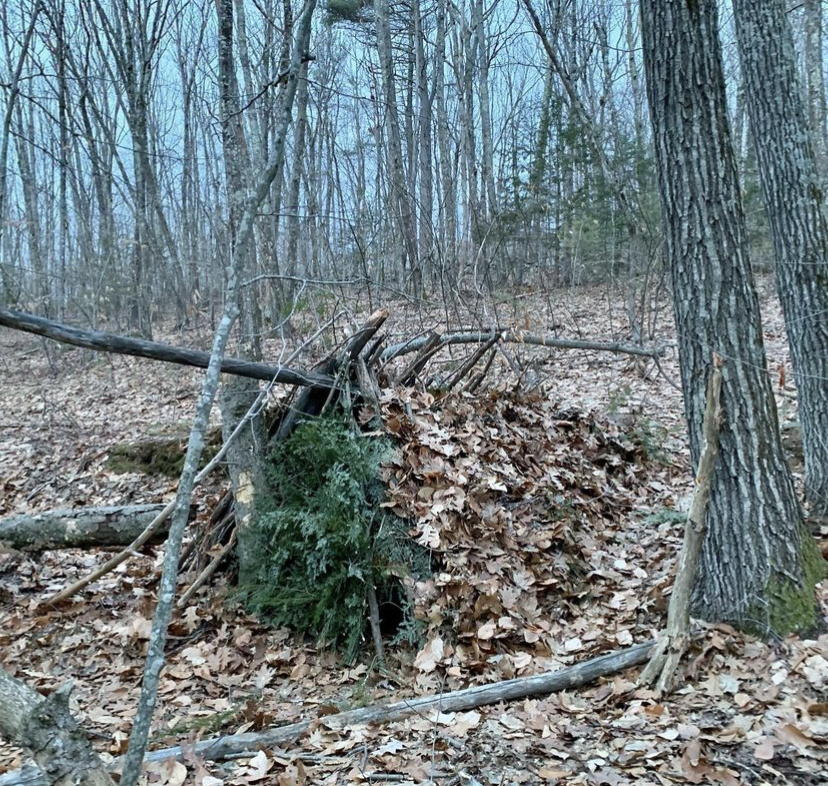
A rudimentary shelter typical of the Knight's Pond Survival Challenge. This shelter belonged to the winner of the 2019 event.

Knight's Pond was originally created by private landowners in the late 1950s who dammed Mill Brook flooding the surrounding wetland for recreational use. The pond area was privately owned but open to the public until 2015, when it was bought by the towns of Cumberland and North Yarmouth for preservation. The forested area north of the Greely Road Extension parking area contains stone rubble from Portland's Union Station, demolished in 1961. The preserve has hosted the annual Knight's Pond Survival Challenge fundraising event since 1971. Knight's Pond was the site of several alleged UFO sightings throughout the 1960s and 1970s. In February 2023, the Blueberry Hill radar tower was used to assist in locating unidentified flying objects over the northeastern United States. During the post-pandemic housing affordability crisis in 2023 and 2024, Knight's Pond Preserve was identified in Cumberland Town Council documents as a potential future location for construction of subsidized affordable housing projects.

== Ecology ==
The Preserve's combination of a large undeveloped forest, wetland, vernal pools and hilltop environments has allowed a number of rare biomes and species to exist, including flying squirrels, endangered amphibians, the northern pitcher plant, and rare oak-hickory forest typically found much further south. The pond is a habitat for migratory geese and ducks as well as a steady beaver population.
