= Maine Correctional Center =

Prison in South Windham, Maine, United States

Coordinates: 43.7268°N 70.41432°W

The Maine Correctional Center is a medium/minimum security prison in South Windham, Maine. It is operated by the Maine Department of Corrections and has an inmate capacity of 662, making it the second largest prison in the state. All residents sentenced to less than five years are directly admitted to this facility.

The facility was established via a legislative act in April 1919 and was originally known as the Reformatory for Men. In 1976, a woman's prison closed and the inmates were moved to the facility. In September 2022, construction was completed on a new MCC facility.
