= Windham, Maine =

Town in Maine, United States

- Town
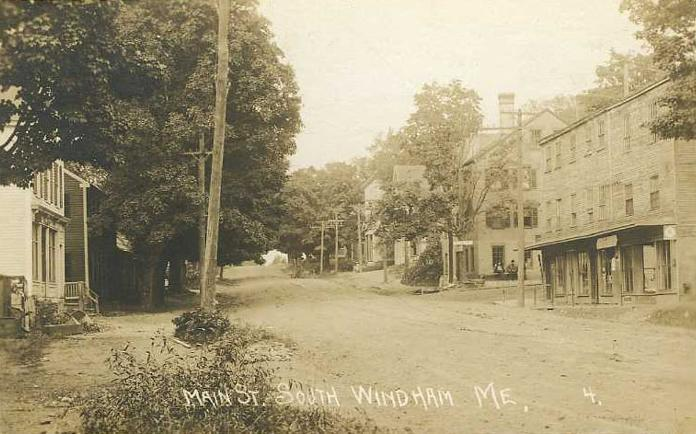
- Main Street, South Windham c. 1910

- Seal Logo
- Motto: Windham Works for Maine
- Location in Cumberland County and the state of Maine.
- Coordinates: 43°47′53″N 70°24′20″W
- Country: United States
- State: Maine
- County: Cumberland
- Incorporated: June 12, 1762
- Villages: Fosters Corner; Newhall; North Windham; Scotland; South Windham; Windham Center; Windham Hill

Area
  - Total: 50.15 sq mi (129.89 km^{2})
  - Land: 46.56 sq mi (120.59 km^{2})
  - Water: 3.59 sq mi (9.30 km^{2})
- Elevation: 243 ft (74 m)

Population (2020)
  - Total: 18,434
  - Density: 396/sq mi (152.9/km^{2})
- Time zone: UTC-5 (Eastern (EST))
  - Summer (DST): UTC-4 (EDT)
- ZIP codes: 04062, 04082
- Area code: 207
- FIPS code: 23-86025
- GNIS feature ID: 582817
- Website: www.windhammaine.us

Windham is a town in Cumberland County, Maine, United States. The population was 18,434 at the 2020 census. It includes the villages of South Windham and North Windham. It is part of the Portland-South Portland-Biddeford metropolitan area.

== History ==
The township was granted in 1734 by the Massachusetts General Court to Abraham Howard, Joseph Blaney and 58 others from Marblehead, Massachusetts. In 1737, New Marblehead Plantation was settled by Captain Thomas Chute. By order of the Massachusetts General Court, a fort was built in spring of 1744 on a hill in the southern part of town near the early center of settlement to offer protection during King George's War. A 50-foot square blockhouse, constructed of 12-inch thick hewn hemlock had an overhanging second story, with firing ports and two swivel guns in watch posts on diagonal corners. The blockhouse was surrounded by a stockade wall of 12-inch diameter log posts 16 feet long. The single gate through the stockade wall was covered by a 4.2-inch (11 cm) bore 9-pounder cannon within the blockhouse.

What became the town of Windham was the realm of the Rockameecook band of Sokoki who fought to retain their homes through the French and Indian Wars. The town's European inhabitants took shelter in the stockade between 1745 and 1751. Indian chief Polin was killed during the last attack on the town on May 14, 1756. New Marblehead Plantation was incorporated on June 12, 1762, as Windham, named for Wymondham in Norfolk, England. Windham Minutemen marched to Portland in response to the Burning of Falmouth on October 18, 1775, and sixteen men were drafted from the town for the Penobscot Expedition. Thirteen Windham men are reported as being members of the Continental Army with George Washington's American Revolutionary War winter encampment at Valley Forge. Windham's nine-pounder cannon and one swivel gun from the stockade blockhouse were loaned to Portland in 1775. Portland had refused to surrender these guns to Captain Henry Mowat as he demanded before he burned the town; and they were placed aboard the privateer Reprieve in 1776.

Most of the early inhabitants were farmers, who found the soil loamy and easily worked. Early subdivision of land was in strips perpendicular to the Presumpscot River and Pleasant River. Each landowner cleared the river floodplain for cropland and had river access for transportation to the coast until River Road and Old Gray Road (United States Route 202) were built linking connected farm buildings on high ground adjacent to the floodplain. Windham provided numerous sites for water power, and as early as 1738 a mill was erected at Mallison Falls. Edmund Fowler and Lester Laflin began manufacturing gunpowder at Gambo Falls (near Newhall) in 1817.

=== Canal ===
The Cumberland and Oxford Canal opened in 1832, carrying goods along the Presumpscot River between Sebago Lake and Portland. Population increased along the Presumpscot River as goods manufactured by river water power could be transported to outside markets. In 1859, when Windham's population was 2,380, it had eight sawmills, a corn and flour mill, two shingle mills, a fulling mill, two carding mills, a woolen textile factory, a barrel factory, a chair stuff factory, the gunpowder factory and two tanneries. Oriental Powder Company became the largest gunpowder factory in Maine, and remained in operation until 1905, providing rock blasting powder, gunpowder for belligerents in the Crimean War, and 25 percent of the Union gunpowder supply for the Civil War. A charcoal house, saltpeter refinery, mills, and storehouses were separated along a mile of both banks of the Presumpscot River upstream of Gambo to minimize damage during infrequent explosions.

=== Railroad ===
The canal fell into disuse after the Portland and Ogdensburg Railway was completed through South Windham and Newhall in 1875. Maine Central Railroad leased the railway as their Mountain Division in 1888. Availability of year-round transportation encouraged C.A. Brown and Company to build a large brick wood-paper board factory at South Windham in 1875. Androscoggin Pulp Company purchased the factory, and the industrial village of South Windham developed around the pulp mill. By 1886, the town also produced felt, boots and shoes, carriages, harness, coffins, clothing and wooden ware. On April 4, 1919, the legislature passed an act creating the Reformatory for Men at South Windham. It is now the Maine Correctional Center, a minimum to medium security facility for men and women.

=== Highway ===
Designation of the transcontinental Roosevelt Trail in 1919 (identified as United States Route 302 since 1935) encouraged increasing numbers of automobile tourists to drive through North Windham. Boody's store was built on the northern corner of the intersection of the Roosevelt Trail and Maine State Route 115 to sell grain, groceries, and hardware. The crossroads village of North Windham has expanded into the commercial center of town through increasing automobile use by Sebago Lake vacationers and suburban Portland commuters.

== Geography ==
According to the United States Census Bureau, the town has a total area of 50.15 square miles (129.89 km^{2}), of which 46.56 square miles (120.59 km^{2}) is land and 3.59 square miles (9.30 km^{2}) is water. Located beside Sebago Lake, Windham is drained by the Pleasant River and the Presumpscot River.

Climate data for Windham, Maine
Month	Jan	Feb	Mar	Apr	May	Jun	Jul	Aug	Sep	Oct	Nov	Dec	Year
Record high °F (°C)	64 (18)	64 (18)	77 (25)	85 (29)	94 (34)	97 (36)	99 (37)	103 (39)	95 (35)	88 (31)	76 (24)	69 (21)	103 (39)
Mean daily maximum °F (°C)	30.3 (−0.9)	34.1 (1.2)	42.2 (5.7)	54.1 (12.3)	65.1 (18.4)	74.2 (23.4)	79.4 (26.3)	78.5 (25.8)	70.3 (21.3)	58.6 (14.8)	47.1 (8.4)	36.0 (2.2)	55.8 (13.2)
Mean daily minimum °F (°C)	10.8 (−11.8)	13.7 (−10.2)	22.9 (−5.1)	33.7 (0.9)	43.7 (6.5)	53.2 (11.8)	58.8 (14.9)	57.5 (14.2)	49.5 (9.7)	37.9 (3.3)	29.3 (−1.5)	18.4 (−7.6)	35.8 (2.1)
Record low °F (°C)	−26 (−32)	−25 (−32)	−21 (−29)	8 (−13)	23 (−5)	35 (2)	40 (4)	33 (1)	26 (−3)	15 (−9)	3 (−16)	−21 (−29)	−26 (−32)
Average precipitation inches (mm)	4.00 (102)	3.18 (81)	4.38 (111)	4.39 (112)	3.90 (99)	3.72 (94)	3.65 (93)	3.32 (84)	3.59 (91)	4.35 (110)	4.67 (119)	4.13 (105)	47.28 (1,201)
Average snowfall inches (cm)	20.3 (52)	15.1 (38)	16.5 (42)	3.7 (9.4)	0 (0)	0 (0)	0 (0)	0 (0)	0 (0)	0 (0)	2.5 (6.4)	16.1 (41)	74.2 (188)

=== Roads and adjoining towns ===
The town is crossed by U.S. routes 202 and 302, and state routes 4, 35 and 115. It borders the towns of Standish and Gorham to the west, Westbrook to the south, Falmouth and Cumberland to the east, Gray to the northeast and Raymond to the north.

==== Secondary roads ====
There are several roads that connect certain parts of the town, as well as to other towns, such as Pope Road (Connecting North Windham to Windham Center), River Road (main connector connecting North Windham and Westbrook), Windham Center Road (mainly crosses the town in an east-west direction, as well as connecting Windham Center to Gorham), and Falmouth Road (connects North Windham to Falmouth).

=== Parks and Recreation ===
Windham is home to several parks and recreation facilities including the town hall, Windham Primary school, Manchester Elementary school, Windham Middle and High schools, as well as several parks.

==== Donnabeth Lippman Park ====
Donnabeth Lippman Park is located near the business district off Rte 302. The 123 acres includes a 10 acre pond for fishing, miles of hiking and biking trails around the 10 acre pond, a story-walk trail, and a playground. Various birds and wildlife inhabit the park.

==== Dundee Park ====
Dundee Park has a beach and picnic area with outdoor grills located in a site along the Presumpscot River. Basketball and volleyball courts are also on the premises.

== Demographics ==
Historical population
Census	Pop.	Note	%±
1790	938		—
1800	1,329		41.7%
1810	1,613		21.4%
1820	1,793		11.2%
1830	2,182		21.7%
1840	2,303		5.5%
1850	2,380		3.3%
1860	2,635		10.7%
1870	2,428		−7.9%
1880	2,312		−4.8%
1890	2,216		−4.2%
1900	1,929		−13.0%
1910	1,954		1.3%
1920	1,932		−1.1%
1930	2,076		7.5%
1940	2,381		14.7%
1950	3,434		44.2%
1960	4,498		31.0%
1970	6,593		46.6%
1980	11,282		71.1%
1990	13,020		15.4%
2000	14,904		14.5%
2010	17,001		14.1%
2020	18,434		8.4%
U.S. Decennial Census

== Notable people ==
- Amy Allen, songwriter; raised in Windham
- John Anderson, US congressman; born in Windham
- John Albion Andrew, 25th Governor of Massachusetts; born in Windham
- Barbara Bagshaw, state legislator
- Mark Bryant, state legislator
- William Diamond, Secretary of State of Maine and state legislator
- Jeff Donnell, actress (The Iron Maiden, The Amazing Spider-Man, and General Hospital); born in South Windham
- Pamela Hayden, actress and voice actress (The Simpsons)
- Robyn Hurder, Tony Award-nominated musical theater actress
- Carol Kontos, state legislator
- James Lovell, Continental Congress member (died in Windham in 1814)
- Gary Plummer, state legislator
- Jane Pringle, state legislator

== Education ==
Windham and neighboring Raymond are part of a consolidated school district called RSU 14. Windham based schools in the RSU include Windham Primary School (K–3), Manchester School (4–5), Windham Middle School (6–8), and Windham High School (9–12).

== Site of interest ==
- Babb’s Bridge
- Windham Historical Society
- Goold House
- Maplewood Farm

== Incidents ==
On August 15, 2025, a shooting occurred in North Windham.
