= South Sanford, Maine =

- Census-designated place
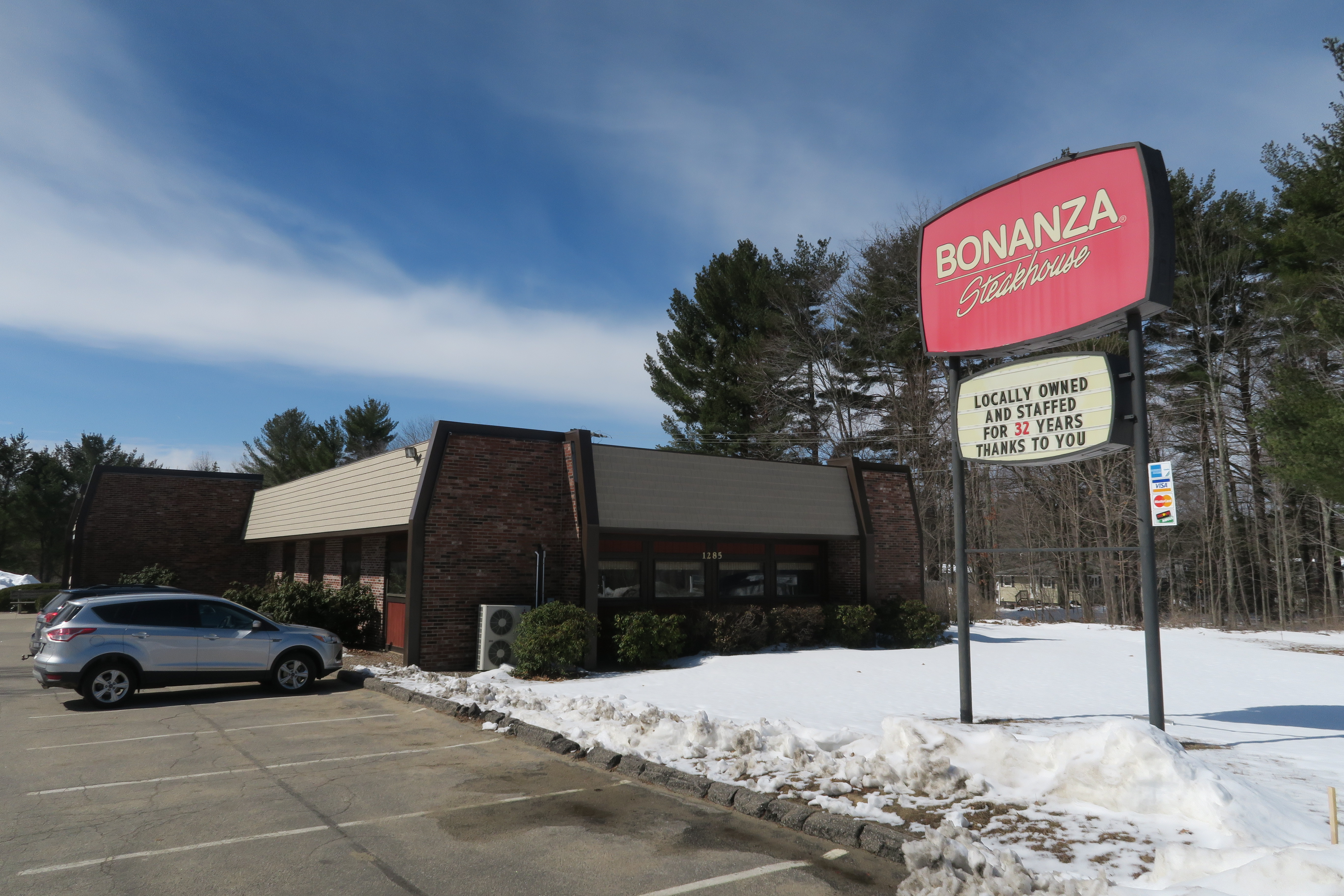
- Bonanza Steakhouse, South Sanford Maine

- Location within the state of Maine
- Coordinates: 43°24′7″N 70°42′35″W
- Country: United States
- State: Maine
- County: York

Area
  - Total: 23.4 sq mi (60.7 km^{2})
  - Land: 22.8 sq mi (59.0 km^{2})
  - Water: 0.66 sq mi (1.7 km^{2})
- Elevation: 282 ft (86 m)

Population (2010)
  - Total: 4,536
  - Density: 199/sq mi (76.9/km^{2})
- Time zone: UTC-5 (Eastern (EST))
  - Summer (DST): UTC-4 (EDT)
- Area code: 207
- FIPS code: 23-72200
- GNIS feature ID: 0575904

South Sanford is a former census-designated place (CDP) in the city of Sanford in York County, Maine, United States. The population was 4,536 at the 2010 census. It is part of the Portland–South Portland–Biddeford, Maine Metropolitan Statistical Area. The CDP was abolished when the town of Sanford re-incorporated as a city.

== Geography ==
South Sanford is located at 43°24′7″N 70°42′35″W (43.401854, -70.709820).

According to the United States Census Bureau, the CDP has a total area of 23.4 square miles (60.7 km^{2}), of which 22.8 square miles (59.0 km^{2}) is land and 0.7 square miles (1.7 km^{2}), or 2.87%, is water.

== Demographics ==
At the 2010 census, there were 4,536 people, 1,859 households and 1,230 families residing in the CDP. The population density was 198.9 inhabitants per square mile (76.8/km^{2}). There were 2,111 housing units at an average density of 92.6 per square mile (35.8/km^{2}). The racial makeup of the CDP was 94.8% White, 0.4% African American, 0.3% Native American, 2.8% Asian, 0.2% some other race, and 1.5% from two or more races. Hispanic or Latino of any race were 1.5% of the population.

There were 1,859 households, out of which 29.9% had children under the age of 18 living with them, 50.9% were headed by married couples living together, 9.5% had a female householder with no husband present, and 33.8% were non-families. 26.5% of all households were made up of individuals, and 11.4% were someone living alone who was 65 years of age or older. The average household size was 2.43, and the average family size was 2.91.

22.0% of the population were under the age of 18, 7.3% from 18 to 24, 24.0% from 25 to 44, 31.2% from 45 to 64, and 15.4% who were 65 years of age or older. The median age was 42.6 years. For every 100 females, there were 97.4 males. For every 100 females age 18 and over, there were 92.8 males.

For the period 2007–2011, the estimated median household income was $54,850 and the median family income was $56,771. Male full-time workers had a median income of $46,134 compared with $34,688 for females. The per capita income was $25,894. About 5.8% of families and 7.4% of the population were below the poverty line, including 6.8% of those under age 18 and 14.2% of those age 65 or over.
