= Ralph Mims =

American former professional basketball player (born 1985)

Personal information
- Born: November 26, 1985 (age 40) Pensacola, Florida, U.S.
- Listed height: 6 ft 2 in (1.88 m)
- Listed weight: 205 lb (93 kg)

Career information
- High school: Brunswick (Brunswick, Maine)
- College: Florida State (2004–2008)
- NBA draft: 2008: undrafted
- Playing career: 2008–2013
- Position: Shooting guard

Career history
- 2008–2009: Pınar Karşıyaka
- 2009: Antalya Büyükşehir Belediyesi
- 2009–2010: Chorale Roanne
- 2010–2011: SLUC Nancy
- 2011: Maroussi
- 2012: Poitiers Basket 86

Career highlights
- Mr. Maine Basketball (2004)

Ralph Mims (born November 26, 1985) is an American former professional basketball player. He is 6'2" and weighs 205 pounds.

== High school ==
Mims scored 1,916 career points at Brunswick High School in Brunswick, Maine. A four-year starter, Mims dominated his competition at the Class A level (Maine's largest schools). As a senior, Mims averaged 29.8 points, 11.4 rebounds, 5.5 assists and 4.5 steals per game. In the 2002 State Championship, sophomore Mims and the Brunswick team faced Deering High School and Nik Caner-Medley. Mims scored 31 points, and Brunswick won the game. Brunswick finished runner-up in the Eastern Maine Final against Bangor in Mims' junior year. Mims' senior year, he carried the team to the state championship against the Portland High School Bulldogs. He scored 46 points in the game but lost.

== College ==
Mims played collegiately at Florida State. In his college debut against Texas Southern University, Mims scored a career high 17 points. As a freshman, Mims played sparingly but averaged 2.8 points per game. As a sophomore, he averaged 3.8 points per game. He also broke a school record for consecutive free throws made, 33, breaking Jim Oler's 1953-54 record of 31. He began to play more as his career continued and broke into the starting lineup his senior season. He played in every game at Florida State during his four-year career.

== Professional ==
Mims made his professional debut, in 2008, with Pinar Karsiyaka of Turkey where he played 11 games and averaged 18.5 points per game. The rights to his contract was later dealt to Antalya Büyükşehir Belediyesi where he spent the rest of the 2008-2009 season, 17 games, averaging 13.8 ppg. On January 21, 2009, Mims set a career high with 34 points against Selcuk University. He, then, joined Chorale Roanne Basket of France for the 2009-2010 season. In 33 games with Chorale he averaged 14.3 points per game.

In June 2010 he signed a one-year contract with the French team SLUC Nancy, where he was champion of the LNB Pro A.

Mims was drafted 50th overall in the 2012 NBA D-League draft by the Iowa Energy.
