= Dale Denno =

American politician (1950–2019)

Dale J. Denno (May 1, 1950 – April 16, 2019) was an American politician who served in the Maine House of Representatives. He was also the assistant attorney general of Maine.

== Early life ==
Denno was born on 1 May 1950 in California and raised in New York. He graduated from Syracuse University and Cornell Law School.

== Career ==
Denno worked for Unum for sixteen years, followed by a stint as assistant attorney general of Maine. He served on the SAD 51 School Board from 1991 to 1997 and was the chair of the school board in 1995 and 1996. Denno later became an instructor at Saint Joseph's College of Maine and manager of the Preble Street Soup Kitchen. He retired from the directorship of the Office for Family Independence within the Maine Department of Health and Human Services in 2013.

Denno contested the open seat of Maine House of Representatives member Steve Moriarty in 2014, losing to Mike Timmons. Denno defeated Timmons in 2016. In November 2018, Denno retained his seat against Republican candidate Tamsin Thomas. Following a diagnosis of lung cancer in 2018, Denno announced that he would resign from the state legislature in March 2019 and endorsed Steve Moriarty. The special election for Denno's legislative seat in district 45 was scheduled for 11 June 2019.

== Personal life ==
Denno died of lung cancer on 16 April 2019, aged 68.
