= Maine School Administrative District 51 =

School district in Maine, United States

Address
- 357 Tuttle Road Cumberland, Maine, 4021; United States
- Coordinates: 43°50′N 70°15′W

District information
- Type: Public
- Grades: PreK–12
- NCES District ID: 2314240

Students and staff
- Students: 2,094 (2020–2021)
- Teachers: 183.84 (on an FTE basis)
- Staff: 404.3 (on an FTE basis)
- Student–teacher ratio: 11.39:1

Other information
- Website: www.msad51.org

The Maine School Administrative District 51 (RSU51/MSAD51) operates three public schools for students in Cumberland, Maine, and North Yarmouth, Maine. The district has 163 teachers (FTEs) serving 2,320 students.

School name	Students	FTE Teachers	Pupil/Teacher Ratio	Low grade	High grade
Greely High School	658	49	13.4	9th Grade	12th Grade
Greely Middle School	364	33.2	11	4th Grade	8th Grade
Mabel I Wilson School	688	48.8	14.1	Kindergarten	3rd Grade

Note: North Yarmouth Memorial School closed in 2014.

Chebeague is no longer attached to MSAD 51. Drowne Road School was closed by the residents of Cumberland and North Yarmouth in 2011 due to budget cuts. North Yarmouth Memorial School was closed in 2014, and Greely Middle School was expanded to fit the students formerly in the North Yarmouth Memorial School. Greely Middle School was opened in 2005 to replace the Greely Junior High School.
