= Center Day Camp =

- Interactive map of Center Day Camp
- Type: Drive-in day camp
- Location: 74 Hackett Road, North Windham, Maine 04062, United States
- Coordinates: 43°50′20″N 70°27′18″W
- Created: 1949; 77 years ago
- Operator: Jewish Community Alliance of Southern Maine
- Website: www.mainejewish.org

Center Day Camp (CDC) is a day camp run by the Jewish Community Alliance of Southern Maine, a 501(c)(3) nonprofit organization that coordinates, promotes, and supports the Jewish philanthropic, benevolent, educational, and communal activities in Southern Maine. It is located in North Windham, Maine, on the shores of Sebago Lake.

== Program ==
The camp is co-ed. Campers range from 3 to 15 years old. CDC provides a traditional Maine summer camp experience for campers on the wooded shores of Lake Sebago. Twenty minutes from Portland, Maine, CDC sits on 27 acres (110,000 m^{2}) of woods, fields, and shoreline. Generations of campers have spent their days at the camp's lake and learned new skills at the camp. CDC accepts campers of all faiths and backgrounds. CDC is accredited by the American Camping Association.

Center Day Camp also has a counselor-in-training (CIT) program whose participants assist staff with group participation, activities, and lesson planning, developing skills to become future counselors.

== Founding ==
Norman Godfrey, a leader in Portland's Jewish community, recognized that few families could afford to send their children to sleep-away camp during the summer, so he decided to start a summer day camp. Godfrey wanted to open the summer camp on Peaks Island, but he died of leukemia in January 1947 before taking his idea to fruition. Others in Portland's Jewish community continued Godfrey's idea in order to make it happen. The summer camp was established, albeit operating in temporary locations. The first location was in Deering Oaks Park in Portland, and it later operated Sebago Lake State Park. It had about 50 campers. The camp was non-sectarian, although most, but not all, of the campers were Jewish. In 1949, Portland's Jewish community took out a loan of $9,500 (equivalent to $129,000 in 2025) in order to buy 12 acres (5 ha) on Sebago Lake as a permanent home for the camp. The loan was formally secured by six volunteers, but ultimately 140 families donated in order to pay back the loan over the next three years. The camp was dedicated to the memory of Godfrey.
