= Goold House =

Historic house in Maine, United States

- U.S. National Register of Historic Places
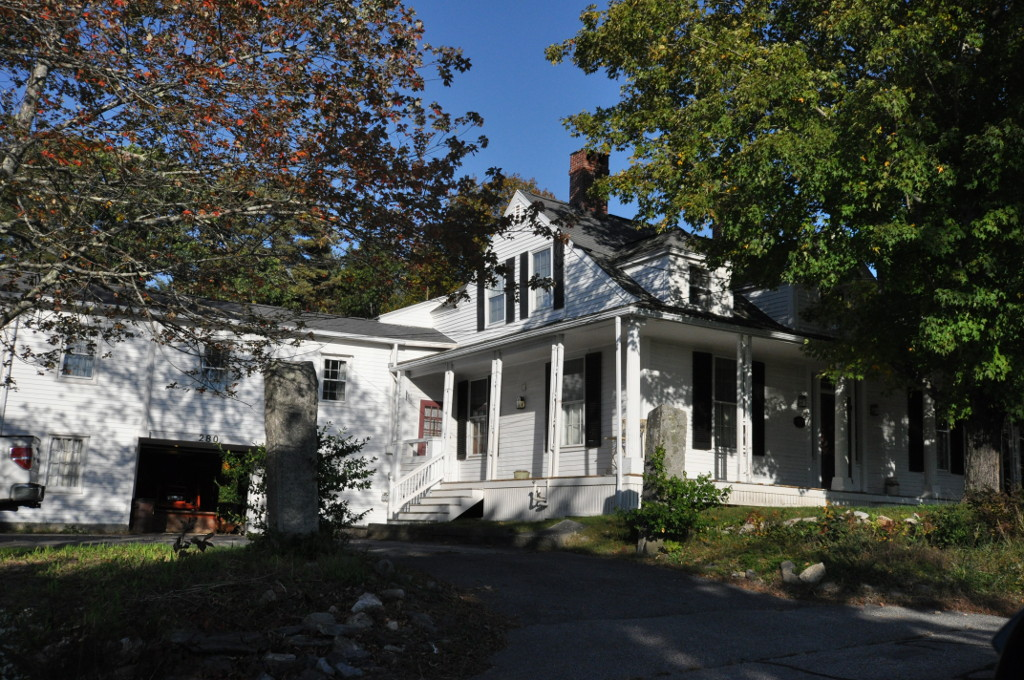

- Location within Maine Location within the United States
- Location: 280 Windham Center Road, Windham, Maine
- Coordinates: 43°47′11″N 70°24′9″W
- Area: 22.5 acres (9.1 ha)
- Built: 1775
- Architect: Nathan Goold
- Architectural style: Cape Cod, Greek Revival
- NRHP reference No.: 89000251
- Added to NRHP: August 10, 1990

The William Goold House is a historic house at 280 Windham Center Road in Windham, Maine. Originally built in the year 1775 and later rebuilt in 1802, it was the longtime home of William Goold, a prominent 19th-century historian of the state of Maine and a state senator. It was listed on the National Register of Historic Places in August 1990.

== Description and history ==
The Goold house is a 1 1/2-story wood-frame structure, clad in clapboards and shingles. Facing south is a Greek Revival gable end, which has been partly obscured by an early 20th-century Colonial Revival porch. The porch is supported by four columns with decoratively carved wooden capitals, and four lattice posts. The columns were reclaimed from an old church in Portland as well as several wood carvings that decorate the homes interior. The porch wraps around the sides of the house, and has a hip roof. The main entrance is in the middle bay of three, and is flanked by sidelight windows and topped by a four-light transom window. The upper level of the house has a side-gable roof, with three dormers facing front. The central dormer is larger, with a gable roof, while the flanking dormers have hip roofs. To the rear of the main block is a single-story addition, which features a distinctive bell tower, which has a bullseye window and formerly an open belvedere under a hip roof. The interior of the house features predominantly Colonial Revival styling.

== See also ==
- National Register of Historic Places listings in Cumberland County, Maine
