= Stephen Moriarty =

American politician

Member of the Maine House of Representatives from the 110th district
- In office December 6, 2022 – December 3, 2024
- Preceded by: Colleen Madigan
- Succeeded by: Christina Mitchell

Personal details
- Party: Democratic

Stephen W. Moriarty (born December 14, 1949, in Boston, Massachusetts) is an American politician from Maine. Moriarty is a graduate of Bowdoin College (1972) and the University of Maine School of Law (1978). He joined the law firm Norman, Hanson, & DeTroy in 1981.

A member of the Democratic Party, Moriarty served as a member of the Cumberland, Maine, Town Council from 1987 to 1993, and again between 1997 and 2012. He was elected to the Maine House of Representatives from district 108, encompassing Cumberland, in 2012, and stepped down in 2014 after Cumberland was redistricted to district 45. In April 2019, Moriarty was selected by the Democratic Party to contest the open seat of district 45 House of Representatives member Dale Denno, who had resigned. Moriarty defeated Kevin Hughes in a June 2019 special election.

Moriarty had three siblings and is married to Pam.
