= Maplewood Farm (South Windham, Maine) =

Historic house in Maine, United States

- U.S. National Register of Historic Places
- U.S. Historic district
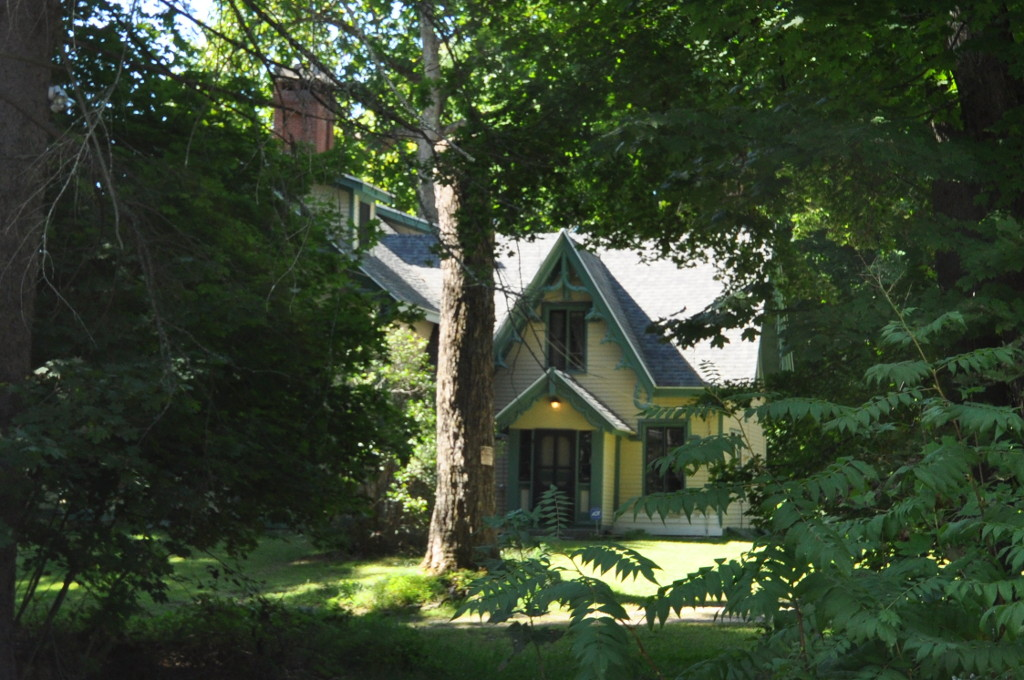

- Location within Maine Location within the United States
- Location: River Rd., opposite Anderson Rd., South Windham, Maine
- Coordinates: 43°42′47″N 70°23′24″W
- Area: 135 acres (55 ha)
- Architectural style: Georgian, Gothic Revival
- NRHP reference No.: 91001813
- Added to NRHP: December 13, 1991

Maplewood Farm, also known as the Anderson-Lord House, is an historic farm property on River Road in South Windham, Maine, United States. The 135-acre (55 ha) farm has been held in the same family since 1738, and features an architecturally distinctive Gothic Revival main house. It is also notable as a summer estate of John Anderson, a prominent mid-19th century Maine politician, and of his son John Farwell Anderson, a noted civil engineer and agriculturalist. It was added to the National Register of Historic Places in 1991.

== Description and history ==
Maplewood Farm consists of several parcels of land, organized in a long strip that is roughly bisected by River Road, and whose western edge is the Presumpscot River. Most of this land is now wooded, the principal exception being a large clearing in which the farm's buildings are located, set at a remove from the southwest side of River Road. The main house is a c. 1770 two story wood-frame structure, which underwent significant alterations in about 1850 to give it its present Gothic Revival appearance, with steeply pitched gables, bargeboard decoration, and lancet-arched windows. Also surviving from the mid-19th century are two barns and a small cottage. The small Anderson family cemetery is set near the road, southeast of the building complex.

The farm property was purchased in 1738 by Abraham Anderson, and was (at the time of the property's listing on the National Register) in 1991 still in the hands of his descendants. The core of the farmhouse was probably built in the mid-1770s by Edward Anderson, not long after his 1774 marriage. In the mid-19th century the property passed to John Anderson, a noted Maine politician who transformed the property into a summer estate and gentleman's farm. Anderson retained Portland architect Charles A. Alexander to make the Gothic Revival alterations to the house, and it is assumed Alexander also developed the plans for the other surviving buildings. John Anderson's son, John Farwell Anderson, is notable for introducing Devon cattle into the state on this farm, and making it one of Windham's most successful farms in the 1860s.

Maplewood Farm has architectural significance for the well-kept collection of Gothic Revival structures, which is one of a small number of such assemblages in the state.

== See also ==
- National Register of Historic Places listings in Cumberland County, Maine
