= Portland metropolitan area, Maine =

Metropolitan area in the northeast US

Portland Metropolitan Area
- Metropolitan Statistical Area
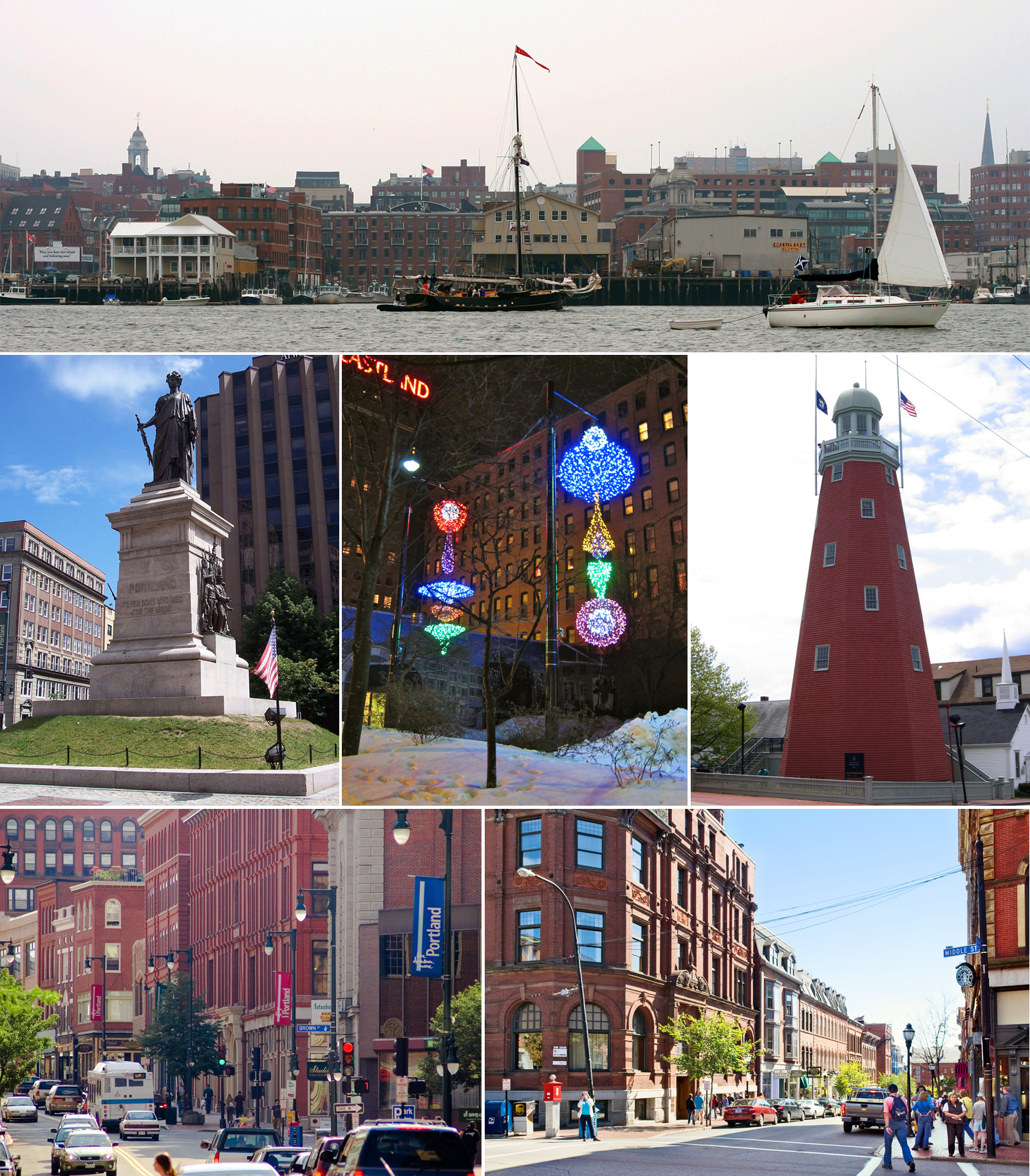
- Clockwise: Portland waterfront, the Portland Observatory on Munjoy Hill, the corner of Middle and Exchange Street in the Old Port, Congress Street, the Civil War Memorial in Monument Square, and winter light sculptures in Congress Square Plaza
Map of Portland–Lewiston–South Portland, ME CSA
City of Portland
Portland–South Portland, ME MSA
Lewiston–Auburn, ME MSA
- Country: United States
- States: Maine
- Principal cities: Portland; Lewiston; South Portland; Auburn
- Other cities: Biddeford; Brunswick; Sanford; Scarborough

Area
  - Total: 2,500 sq mi (6,600 km^{2})

Population (2020)
  - Total: 551,740

GDP
  - Total: $43.764 billion (2022)
- Time zone: UTC−5 (EST)
  - Summer (DST): UTC−4 (EDT)

The city of Portland, Maine, is the hub city of a metropolitan area in southern Maine. The region is commonly known as Greater Portland or the Portland metropolitan area. For statistical purposes, the U.S. federal government defines three different representations of the Portland metropolitan area. The Portland–South Portland, Maine, metropolitan statistical area is a region consisting of three counties in Maine, anchored by the city of Portland and the smaller city of South Portland. As of the 2020 census, the MSA had a population of 551,740. A larger combined statistical area (CSA), the Portland–Lewiston–South Portland combined statistical area, is defined as the combination of this metropolitan statistical area (MSA) with the adjacent Lewiston–Auburn MSA. The CSA comprises four counties in southern Maine. The Portland–South Portland metropolitan New England city and town area is defined on the basis of cities and towns rather than entire counties. It consists of most of Cumberland and York counties plus the town of Durham in Androscoggin County. The Greater Portland area has emerged as an important center for the creative economy, which is also bringing gentrification.

== Metropolitan statistical area ==
=== Components ===
The Portland–South Portland Metropolitan Statistical Area MSA is defined as consisting of Cumberland, Sagadahoc, and York counties.

County	Seat	2025 estimate	2020 Census	Change	Land area	Density
Cumberland	Portland	317,222	303,069	+4.67%	835 sq mi (2,160 km^{2})	380/sq mi (147/km^{2})
York	Alfred	222,434	211,972	+4.94%	991 sq mi (2,570 km^{2})	224/sq mi (87/km^{2})
Sagadahoc	Bath	37,979	36,699	+3.49%	254 sq mi (660 km^{2})	150/sq mi (58/km^{2})
Total		577,635	551,740	+4.69%	2,080 sq mi (5,400 km^{2})	278/sq mi (107/km^{2})

Portland and South Portland are the largest cities in this area and are defined as principal cities of the MSA. Other cities in the MSA are:

- Bath
- Biddeford
- Saco
- Sanford
- Westbrook

Towns in the three-county MSA are:

- Acton
- Alfred
- Arrowsic
- Arundel
- Baldwin
- Berwick
- Bowdoin
- Bowdoinham
- Bridgton
- Brunswick
- Buxton
- Cape Elizabeth
- Casco
- Chebeague Island
- Cornish
- Cumberland
- Dayton
- Eliot
- Falmouth
- Freeport
- Frye Island
- Georgetown
- Gorham
- Gray
- Harpswell
- Harrison
- Hollis
- Kennebunk
- Kennebunkport
- Kittery
- Lebanon
- Limerick
- Limington
- Long Island
- Lyman
- Naples
- New Gloucester
- Newfield
- North Berwick
- North Yarmouth
- Ogunquit
- Old Orchard Beach
- Parsonsfield
- Phippsburg
- Pownal
- Raymond
- Richmond
- Scarborough
- Sebago
- Shapleigh
- South Berwick
- Standish
- Topsham
- Waterboro
- Wells
- West Bath
- Windham
- Woolwich
- Yarmouth
- York

Census-designated places in the MSA are:

- Berwick
- Bridgton
- Brunswick
- Brunswick Station
- Cape Neddick
- Cumberland Center
- Falmouth Foreside
- Freeport
- Gorham
- Kennebunk
- Kennebunkport
- Kittery
- Kittery Point
- Lake Arrowhead

- Little Falls
- North Berwick
- North Windham
- Old Orchard Beach
- Richmond
- Scarborough
- South Eliot
- South Sanford
- South Windham
- Springvale
- Topsham
- West Kennebunk
- Yarmouth
- York Harbor

The MSA includes one unorganized territory, the township of Perkins.

=== Demographics ===
Historical population
Census	Pop.	Note	%±
1900	100,689		—
1910	112,014		11.2%
1920	124,376		11.0%
1930	134,645		8.3%
1940	146,000		8.4%
1950	169,201		15.9%
1960	304,946		80.2%
1970	327,556		7.4%
1980	384,250		17.3%
1990	441,257		14.8%
2000	487,568		10.5%
2010	514,098		5.4%
2020	551,740		7.3%
U.S. Decennial Census

Ten years earlier, as of the census of 2000, there were 487,568 people, 196,669 households, and 128,201 families residing within the MSA. The racial makeup of the MSA was 96.49% White, 0.80% African American, 0.27% Native American, 1.09% Asian, 0.04% Pacific Islander, 0.28% from other races, and 1.03% from two or more races. Hispanic or Latino of any race were 0.87% of the population.

As of the 2000 census, the median income for a household in the MSA was $43,195, and the median income for a family was $51,873. Males had a median income of $35,402 versus $26,213 for females. The per capita income for the MSA was $21,851.

== Combined statistical area ==
The Portland–Lewiston–South Portland Combined Statistical Area is made up of four counties in Maine. The statistical area includes two metropolitan statistical areas. As of the 2000 Census, the CSA had a population of 591,361 (a 2025 estimate placed the population at 694,122).

=== Components ===
Metropolitan statistical areas:

- Portland-South Portland (Cumberland, Sagadahoc, and York counties)
- Lewiston-Auburn (Androscoggin County)

== New England city and town areas ==
An alternative federal government delineation of Portland's metropolitan area is the Portland–South Portland, ME Metropolitan New England City and Town Area. A New England City and Town Area (NECTA) is typically a finer-grained definition of a metropolitan area because it is based on cities and towns rather than entire counties. The Portland–South Portland NECTA consists of 24 cities and towns in Cumberland County, 14 cities and towns in York County, and the town of Durham in Androscoggin County.

Other parts of the Southern Maine region are identified as components of other NECTAs. The towns of Sanford and Shapleigh in York County form the Sanford, Maine, Micropolitan NECTA. The Brunswick, Maine, Micropolitan NECTA consists of two towns in Cumberland County, one city and eight towns in Sagadahoc County, and three towns in Lincoln County. Two metropolitan NECTAs centered in New Hampshire, the Dover-Durham, NH-ME Metropolitan NECTA (anchored by the principal cities of Dover and Durham, New Hampshire) and the Portsmouth, NH-ME Metropolitan NECTA (anchored by Portsmouth, New Hampshire) each include three York County towns. The Lewiston-Auburn Metropolitan NECTA is defined as including 11 Androscoggin County cities and towns, as well as four towns in Oxford County and one in Kennebec County.

Similar to a CSA, the Portland–Lewiston–South Portland Combined NECTA is defined to consist of the Portland–South Portland and Lewiston–Auburn Metropolitan NECTAs and the Brunswick and Sanford Micropolitan NECTAs. The three York County towns that are included in the Portsmouth, New Hampshire Metropolitan NECTA are, however, considered to be part of the Boston–Worcester–Providence, MA–RI–NH–CT–ME Combined NECTA.

The state of Maine uses NECTAs as one basis for defining labor market areas for purposes of compiling and reporting statistics on employment and unemployment. Labor market area definitions used for the Portland area include the Portland–South Portland Metropolitan Area, the Sanford Micropolitan Area, and the combination of these two areas, known as Portland–South Portland–Sanford combined statistical area.

== See also ==
- Maine census statistical areas
- Portland metropolitan area
