= Pleasant River (Presumpscot River tributary) =

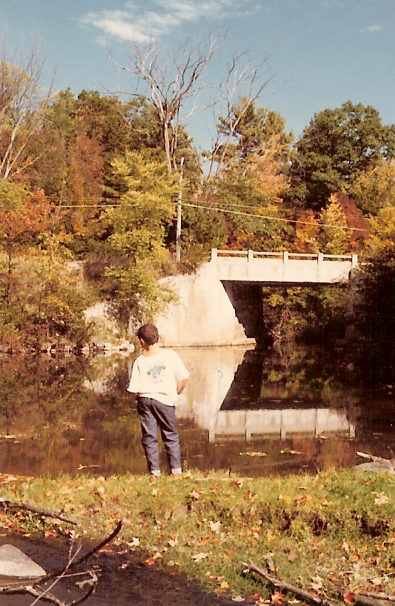
- Pleasant River confluence with Ditch Brook at U.S. Route 302 bridge

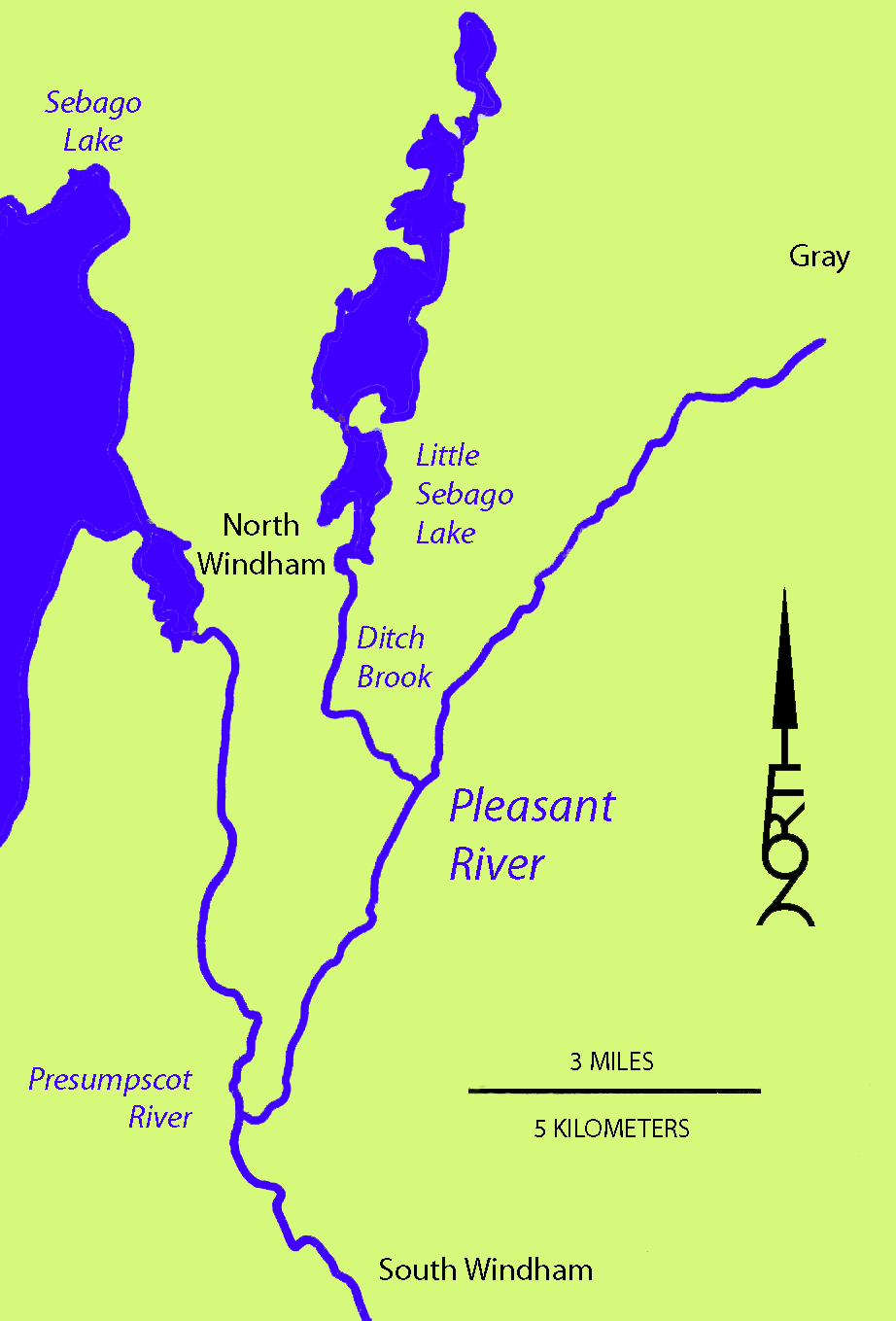

Location
- Country: United States
- State: Maine
- Region: Cumberland County

Physical characteristics
- Source: Gray, Maine
  - coordinates: 43°52′51″N 70°18′34″W
- Mouth: Presumpscot River
  - coordinates: 43°45′31″N 70°26′48″W
  - elevation: 121 ft (37 m)
- Length: 13 mi (21 km)
- Basin size: 29 sq mi (75 km^{2})

The Pleasant River is a 13.1-mile-long (21.1 km) tributary of the Presumpscot River in the U.S. state of Maine.

The Pleasant River originates in the town of Gray and parallels U.S. Route 202 as it flows southwesterly through the town of Windham to discharge into the Presumpscot River upstream of the village of South Windham. With the exception of a few cascades over exposed bedrock, the river has a fairly low gradient through the Presumpscot Formation of silt and clay marine mud with localized sandy lenses. Through the center of Windham, the river cuts through end moraines of glacial till, sand and gravel.

== Little Sebago Lake ==
Little Sebago Lake
- Location within Maine
- Location: Cumberland County, Maine
- Coordinates: 43°53′N 70°25′W
- Basin countries: United States
- Max. length: 6 mi (9.7 km)
- Max. width: 1 mi (1.6 km)
- Surface area: 2,009 acres (813 ha)
- Max. depth: 52 feet (16 m)
- Water volume: 32,627 acre⋅ft (40,245,000 m^{3})
- Surface elevation: 285 ft (87 m)

Little Sebago Lake extends from western Gray into northern Windham, and is fed by tributaries originating in eastern Raymond. Public access is available from Mount Hunger Road in Windham. The lake originally drained westerly into Sebago Lake through Boody Meadow and Outlet Brook, but was diverted into the Pleasant River for early water power projects. The lake offers good habitat for smallmouth bass, largemouth bass and chain pickerel. Deep water oxygen deficiencies limit summer habitat for trout; but brown trout are able to survive in the thermocline at a depth of approximately 7 metres (23 ft).

== Water power ==
Early water power surveys found suitable Pleasant River locations at Jackson's Falls or Huston's Falls (where grist, shook, and lumber mills were constructed) near the Gray-Windham town line, a 10-foot (3.0 m) drop at Varney's Falls where a sawmill was constructed near the Route 202 bridge, an 8-foot (2.4 m) drop at Anderson's Falls where a sawmill was constructed near the road from Windham Center to Windham Hill, a 10-foot (3.0 m) drop at Pope's Falls (where lumber, corn, flour, grist, wool carding, and cloth weaving mills were constructed) near Popeville, a 7-foot (2.1 m) drop at Allen's Falls where a sawmill was constructed, and a 10-foot (3.0 m) drop at Baker's Falls where a stave mill was constructed. Colonel Edward Anderson increased flow through these falls by diverting additional water to the Pleasant River through the moraine at the south end of Little Sebago Lake. Water power was developed at the moraine and on the resulting Ditch Brook where a stave mill was built on the Varney Mill Road above the confluence with Pleasant River at the U.S. Route 302 bridge.

== Flooding ==
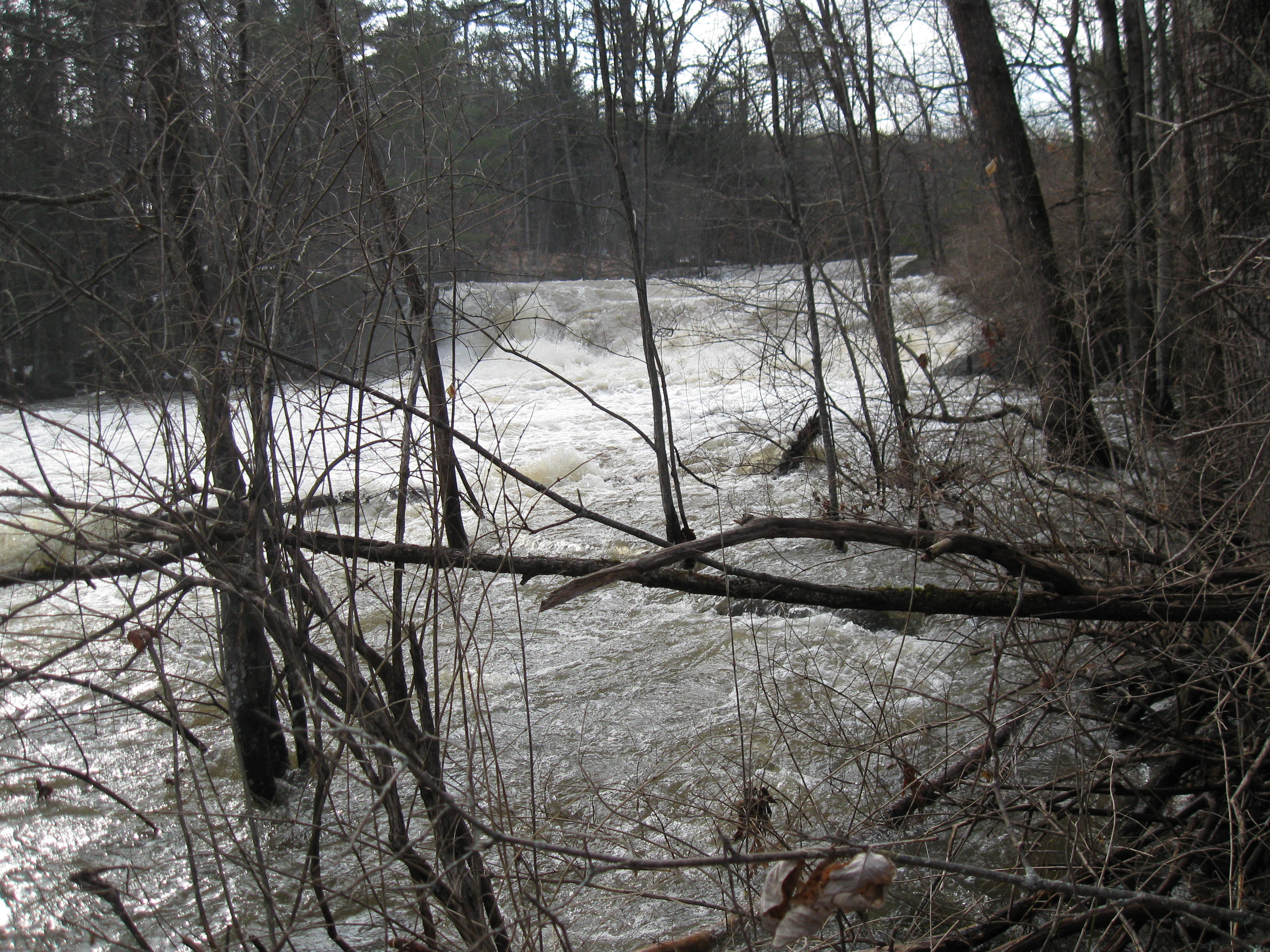
Pleasant River in flood

The outlet control structure at the south end of Little Sebago Lake failed on 4 June 1814, and within a few hours water draining to the Pleasant River eroded a channel through the moraine, dropping the lake elevation 50 feet (15 m). The resulting flood swept away two mills and six bridges along the Pleasant and Presumpscot rivers as far downstream as South Windham. Drainage from Little Sebago Lake was permanently diverted from Outlet Brook into the Pleasant River by destruction of the moraine, although the lake level was partially restored by construction of a stone dam at the narrows in 1860. That dam failed with similar downstream damage on 7 May 1861, but has subsequently been rebuilt.

== Wildlife ==
The Maine Department in Inland Fisheries and Wildlife stocks the river with brook trout and brown trout. Pleasant River is the only known brook floater habitat in southern Maine. Brook floaters are a federal species of special concern, and considered threatened in Maine. Brook floater populations in the river declined from 2001 to 2009. Pleasant River water quality is impaired by elevated bacteria counts and depressed concentrations of dissolved oxygen. Livestock grazing on streambank pastures is a source of high bacteria counts in river water, and manure in snowmelt runoff may be a contributing factor to low dissolved oxygen concentrations. Residential septic systems, lawn fertilizers, and pet waste are other potential causes of water quality impairment. The Windham School Wastewater Treatment Facility effluent discharged to the river near the Windham Center Road has had sporadic non-compliance with effluent biochemical oxygen demand.

== See also ==
- List of rivers of Maine
