= Windham High School (Maine) =

Location
- 406 Gray Road; Windham, Maine 04062; United States
- Coordinates: 43.7869°N 70.4126°W

Information
- Other name: WHS
- Type: Public high school
- School district: Windham Raymond School District RSU14
- NCES School ID: 231479300632
- Principal: Ryan Caron
- Teaching staff: 77.70 (on an FTE basis)
- Grades: 9–12
- Enrollment: 944 (2023-2024)
- Student to teacher ratio: 12.15
- Nickname: Eagles
- Accreditation: New England Association of Schools and Colleges
- Website: whs.rsu14.org

Windham High School (WHS) is a public high school in Windham, Maine, United States. It is part of the Windham Raymond School District RSU14 and accredited by the New England Association of Schools and Colleges (NEASC).
