= Robert G. Dillenback =

American politician

Robert G. Dillenback (died March 12, 2003) was an American politician from Maine. Dillenback, a Republican from Cumberland, served in the Maine House of Representatives from 1981 to 1986. In November 1986, he was elected to the Maine Senate, where served two terms. During his first term in the Senate, Dillenback served on the Economic Development Committee. He left the Senate in 1990 and died on March 12, 2003.
