= Brunswick Station, Maine =

- Census-designated place
- Location in Cumberland County and the state of Maine.
- Coordinates: 43°53′43″N 69°55′48″W
- Country: United States
- State: Maine
- County: Cumberland
- Town: Brunswick

Area
  - Total: 4.9 sq mi (12.8 km^{2})
  - Land: 4.9 sq mi (12.7 km^{2})
  - Water: 0.039 sq mi (0.1 km^{2})

Population (2010)
  - Total: 578
  - Density: 118/sq mi (45.5/km^{2})
- Time zone: UTC-5 (Eastern (EST))
  - Summer (DST): UTC-4 (EDT)
- Area code: 207
- FIPS code: 23-08500

Brunswick Station was a census-designated place (CDP) within the town of Brunswick in Cumberland County, Maine, United States. The population was 578 at the 2010 census. It consists of an area that was part of the former Naval Air Station Brunswick and was part of the Portland–South Portland–Biddeford, Maine Metropolitan Statistical Area. The 2020 census shows it as part of the Brunswick CDP.

== Geography ==
Brunswick Station is located at 43°53′43″N 69°55′48″W (43.895268, -69.930045).

According to the United States Census Bureau, the CDP has a total area of 4.9 square miles (12.8 km^{2}), of which 4.9 square miles (12.7 km^{2}) is land and 0.04 square miles (0.1 km^{2}), or 1.10%, is water.

== Demographics ==
As of the census of 2000, there were 1,511 people, 366 households, and 337 families residing in the CDP. The population density was 399.5 inhabitants per square mile (154.2/km^{2}). There were 383 housing units at an average density of 101.3 per square mile (39.1/km^{2}). The racial makeup of the CDP was 80.94% White, 10.72% African American, 0.99% Native American, 1.59% Asian, 0.07% Pacific Islander, 3.18% from other races, and 2.51% from two or more races. Hispanic or Latino of any race were 7.15% of the population.

There were 366 households, out of which 70.5% had children under the age of 18 living with them, 80.1% were married couples living together, 10.7% had a female householder with no husband present, and 7.9% were non-families. 4.9% of all households were made up of individuals, and 0.3% had someone living alone who was 65 years of age or older. The average household size was 3.14 and the average family size was 3.23.

In the CDP, the population was spread out, with 29.6% under the age of 18, 28.1% from 18 to 24, 40.1% from 25 to 44, 2.1% from 45 to 64, and 0.2% who were 65 years of age or older. The median age was 23 years. For every 100 females, there were 132.1 males. For every 100 females age 18 and over, there were 142.4 males.

The median income for a household in the CDP was $35,000, and the median income for a family was $35,066. Males had a median income of $20,806 versus $19,706 for females. The per capita income for the CDP was $14,681. About 2.5% of families and 5.0% of the population were below the poverty line, including 5.1% of those under age 18 and none of those age 65 or over.
