= Cumberland Fair =

Annual farmers' fair in Maine, US

Coordinates: 43°48′36″N 70°17′24″W

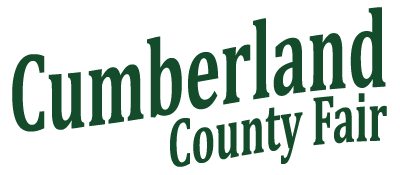
- Dates: Final week of September
- Locations: Cumberland, Maine, U.S.
- Founded: 1869 (157 years ago)
- Website: cumberlandfair.com

The Cumberland Fair is an annual farmers' fair held in Cumberland, Maine, United States. Held at the Cumberland Fairgrounds by the Cumberland Farmers' Club, it is usually held during the final week of September. The fair hosts livestock shows, produce contests, horse races, and ox-pulls. It has operated since 1869.

== Events ==
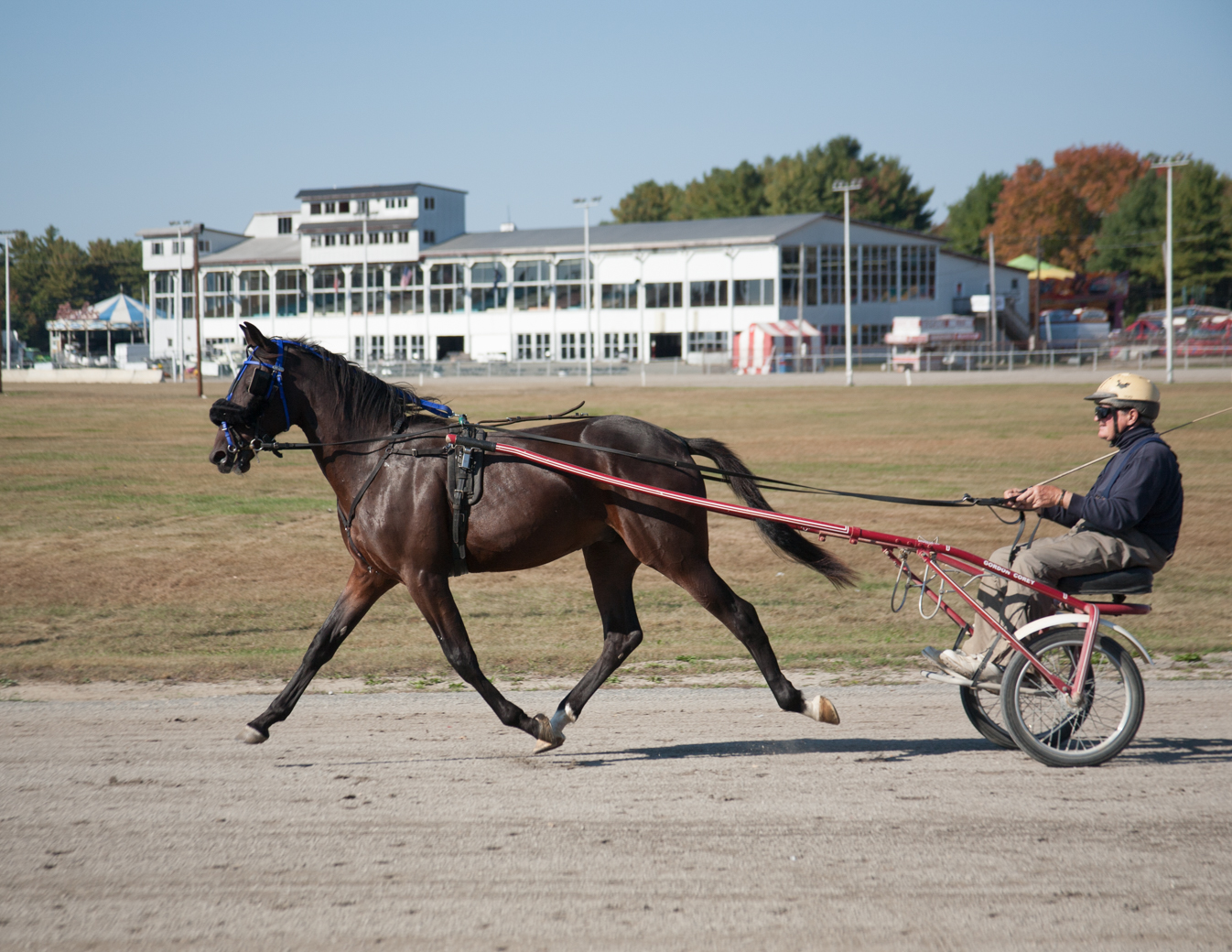
Harness racing at the Cumberland Fair

The fair has multiple types of livestock shows, mainly cattle, sheep, goat, and horse. It also has harness racing on each day of the fair.

Cumberland Fair has hosted ox-pulling events since its inception in 1869, when it was known as the Cumberland Town Fair. Ox-pulling involves a pair of yoked oxen hauling weights while guided by a handler. Currently, the sport is only practiced New England. The fair has two ox-pull events: the Ox-Pull (which is unisex) and the Ladies' Pulling (which is women-only). Given the nature of the sport, the reason for a women-only section is mainly to get more women interested in the sport. The Ladies' Pulling was called the Powder Puff Pull until the name was changed in 2021.

Cumberland Fair hosts the annual State of Maine Apple Pie Contest, considered the most prestigious pie contest in the state.

Winner of the 2023 pumpkin contest

The annual Maine State Pumpkin and Squash Weigh-Off is held at the fair. The winner of the event receives $500. An adult is limited to one entry in the giant squash and pumpkin weigh-off.

== History ==
=== 1800s ===
The inaugural Cumberland Fair was held for two days, on October 10 and 11, 1869, in the center of town in the back of what is now Greely Junior High School. The land was provided by Capt. Enos Blanchard. On show were foods, handicrafts, vegetables of all shapes and sizes, and steers. Horse racing and ox-pulling were featured events.

In 1874, the fairgrounds moved to their current location in West Cumberland. Between 1874 and 1878, two rival groups—the Cumberland Farmers Club and the Cumberland Centre Club—ran competing fairs, with the latter shutting down in 1878.

The first pig scramble event in Maine was held at the Cumberland Fair in 1893.

=== 1900s ===
The first exhibition hall on the grounds was built in 1912; it burned down in 1917. Due to the events of World War I and the Spanish Flu, it was not rebuilt until 1921.

The event was renamed the Cumberland County Fair in 1952. A second exhibition hall was built in 1960, with the old one being designated for 4H use.

=== 2000s ===
The fair was cancelled in 2020 due to the Covid-19 pandemic. In 2022, the Cumberland Fair celebrated its 150th anniversary.

In 2025, the Fryeburg Fair started a day early, making it overlap with the Cumberland Fair for the first time and causing many vendors to leave the Fryeburg Fair for the Cumberland Fair. In 2026, the fairs returned to their regular schedule.
