= South Windham, Maine =

- Census-designated place
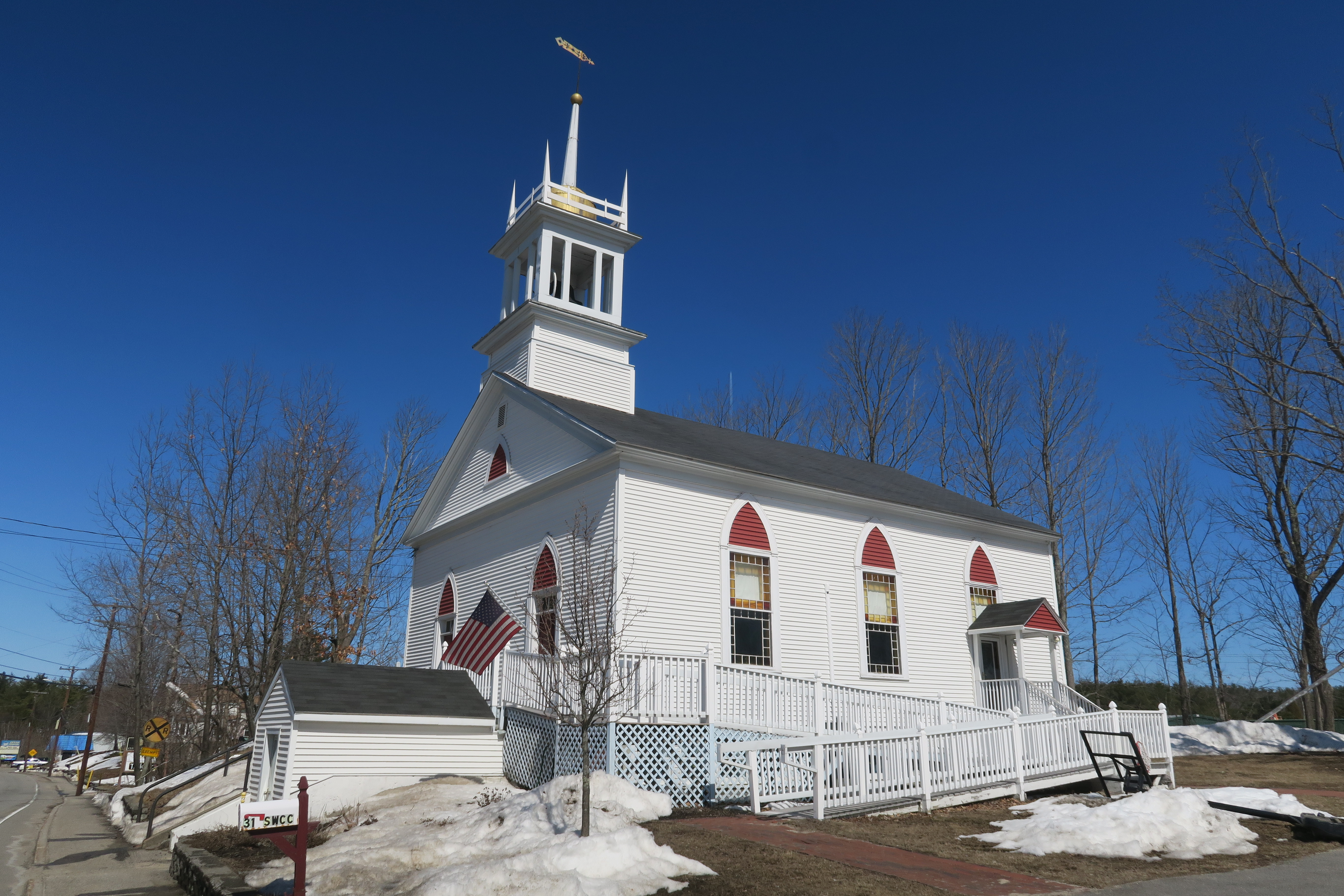
- South Windham Community Church and Center

- Location in Cumberland County and the state of Maine
- Coordinates: 43°44′38″N 70°25′33″W
- Country: United States
- State: Maine
- County: Cumberland
- Town: Windham

Area
  - Total: 1.26 sq mi (3.27 km^{2})
  - Land: 1.19 sq mi (3.09 km^{2})
  - Water: 0.066 sq mi (0.17 km^{2})
- Elevation: 154 ft (47 m)

Population (2020)
  - Total: 1,215
  - Density: 1,017.5/sq mi (392.87/km^{2})
- Time zone: UTC-5 (Eastern (EST))
  - Summer (DST): UTC-4 (EDT)
- ZIP Code: 04062 (Windham)
- Area code: 207
- FIPS code: 23-72900
- GNIS feature ID: 2633176

South Windham is a census-designated place (CDP) in the town of Windham in Cumberland County, Maine, United States. South Windham is included in the Lewiston-Auburn, Maine metropolitan New England City and Town Area. As of the 2020 census, South Windham had a population of 1,215. Prior to 2010, South Windham was part of the Little Falls-South Windham census-designated place.

It is part of the Portland–South Portland–Biddeford, Maine Metropolitan Statistical Area.

== History ==
The Presumpscot River was an early transportation corridor to interior Maine; and provided reliable water power at Little Falls. Major William Knight was operating a sawmill at the falls in 1756. As the local forests were cleared, the sawmill was replaced by William Johnson's grist mill and a wool carding mill operated by Leonard Bacon and Lathrop Crockett. Locks were constructed around the falls to complete the Cumberland and Oxford Canal in 1832. The canal fell into disuse after the Portland and Ogdensburg Railway was completed through South Windham in 1875. Maine Central Railroad leased the railway as their Mountain Division in 1888. Availability of year-round transportation encouraged C.A. Brown and Company to build a large brick wood-paper board factory at South Windham in 1875. Androscoggin Pulp Company purchased the factory, and the industrial village of South Windham developed around the pulp mill. On April 4, 1919, the legislature passed an act creating the Reformatory for Men at South Windham. It is now the Maine Correctional Center, a minimum to medium security facility for men and women.

== Geography ==
South Windham is located along the Presumpscot River. According to the United States Census Bureau, the CDP has a total area of 1.3 square miles (3.3 km^{2}), of which 1.2 square miles (3.1 km^{2}) is land and 0.077 square miles (0.2 km^{2}), or 5.31%, is water.

The CDP of Little Falls is located directly across the Presumpscot River, in the town of Gorham. U.S. Route 202 and Maine State Route 4 run north-south in a concurrency through both communities.

== Demographics ==
Historical population
Census	Pop.	Note	%±
2020	1,215		—
U.S. Decennial Census

== Notable person ==
- Jeff Donnell, actress (The Iron Maiden, The Amazing Spider-Man, and General Hospital); born in South Windham
