= Houlton High School =

Coordinates: 46.1286°N 67.8275°W

- 7 Bird Street; Houlton, Maine 04730; United States

Information
- NCES School ID: 231116000416
- Principal: TBD
- Teaching staff: 23.70 (FTE)
- Grades: 9–12
- Enrollment: 387 (2023-2024)
- Student to teacher ratio: 16.33
- Campus type: Rural
- Mascot: Judge
- Yearbook: North Star
- Website: Houlton Middle/High School

Houlton High School is a public high school in Houlton, Maine, United States. It is part of regional school unit (RSU) 29.

== Notable alumni ==
- Dora Pinkham – first woman elected to the Maine Legislature.
