= Cumberland, Maine =

Town in Maine, United States

- Town
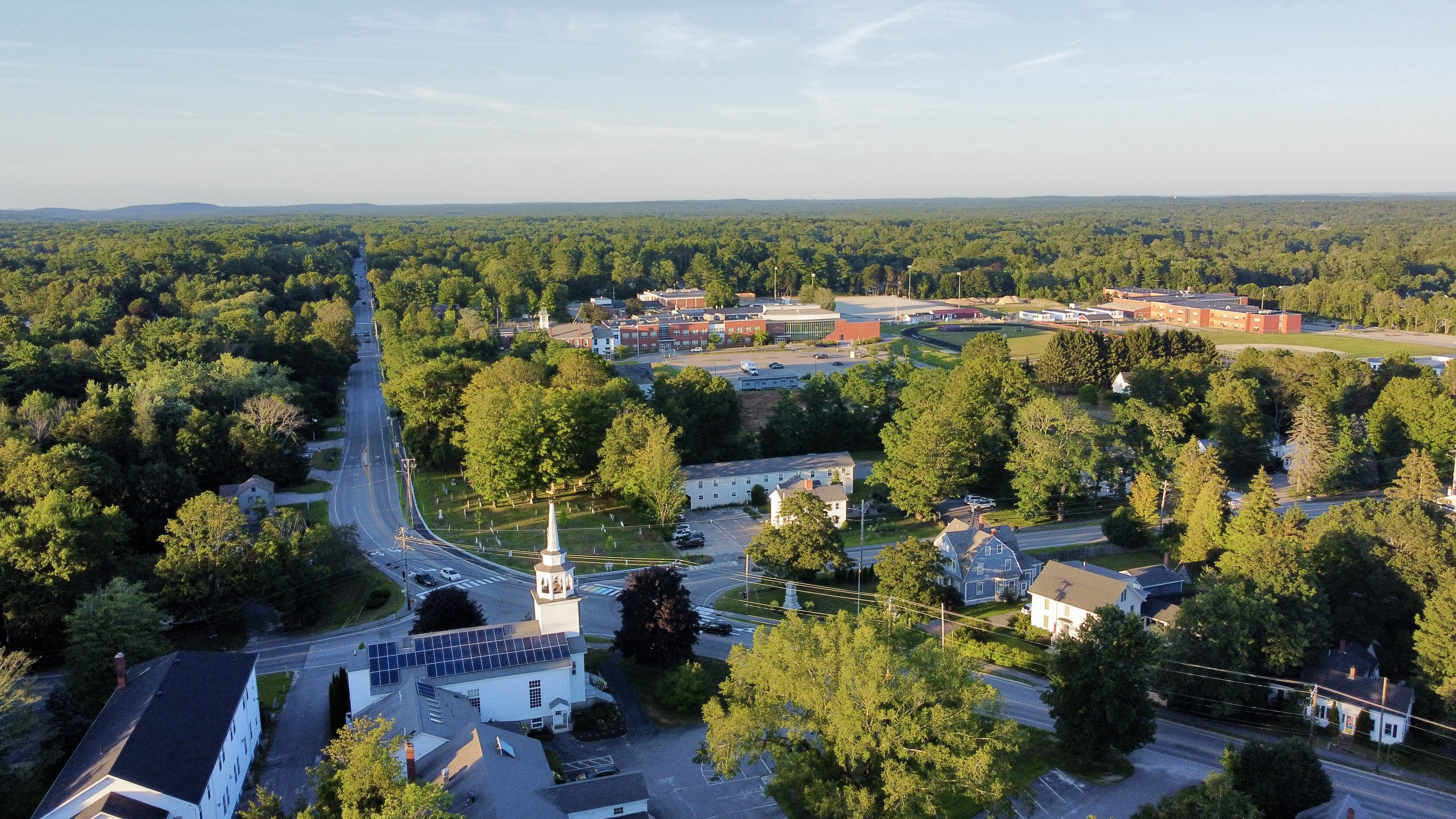
- Cumberland Center, looking northeast at the Congregational Church, Greely High School, and Main Street

- Location in Cumberland County and the state of Maine.
- Coordinates: 43°46′52″N 70°14′03″W
- Country: United States
- State: Maine
- County: Cumberland
- Villages: Cumberland Center; Cumberland Foreside; West Cumberland

Area
  - Total: 26.25 sq mi (67.99 km^{2})
  - Land: 22.88 sq mi (59.26 km^{2})
  - Water: 3.37 sq mi (8.73 km^{2})
- Elevation: 85 ft (26 m)

Population (2020)
  - Total: 8,754
  - Density: 370/sq mi (143/km^{2})
- Time zone: UTC-5 (Eastern (EST))
  - Summer (DST): UTC-4 (EDT)
- ZIP Codes: 04021 (Cumberland Center); 04110 (Cumberland Foreside)
- Area code: 207
- FIPS code: 23-15430
- GNIS feature ID: 582427
- Website: https://www.townofcumberlandmaine.gov/

Cumberland is a town in Cumberland County, Maine, United States. The population was 8,473 at the time of the 2020 census. It is part of the Portland metropolitan area, Maine. Cumberland is one of the wealthiest municipalities in the state.

== History ==
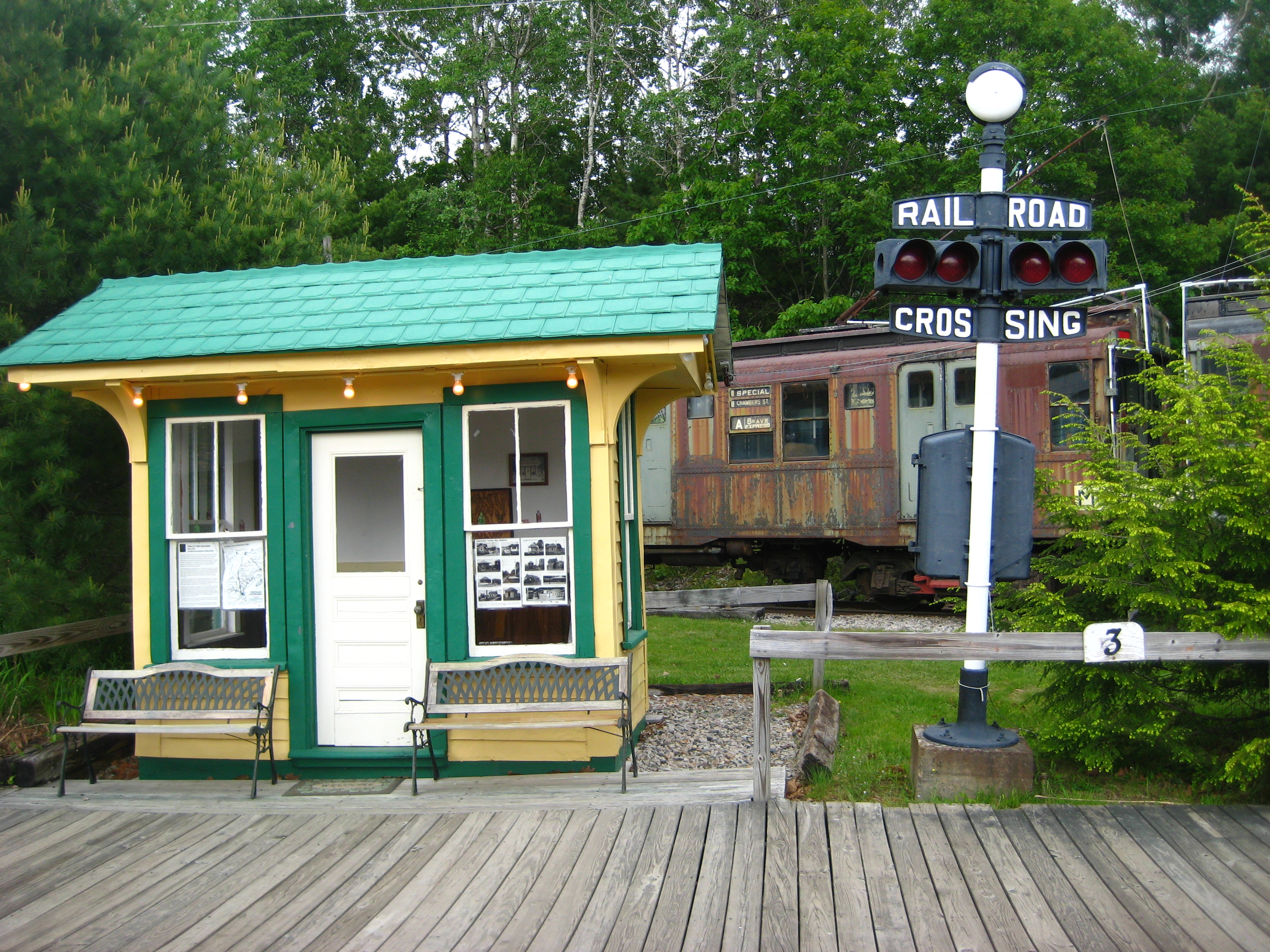
The former Morrison Hill station of the Portland-Lewiston Interurban, which served Cumberland from 1915 to 1933. The station is now located at Seashore Trolley Museum.

Cumberland, Maine (also known as Cumberland Center), became independent in March 1821 after it split from North Yarmouth. The town was officially named by Ephraim Sturdivant when the new town government elected him to do the task.

The Cumberland Fair, an annual agricultural fair, has been held yearly in Cumberland during the month of September since 1868. This Portland suburb has a rich farming history, but only a small number of working farms remain, such as Sweetser's Apple Barrel & Orchards, Spring Brook Farms, and Double T Orchards. Chebeague Island, long a part of Cumberland, formed its own town in 2007. Since 1960, Cumberland's motto has been "Where what comes around keeps going around!"

== Geography ==
According to the United States Census Bureau, the town has a total area of 26.25 square miles (67.99 km^{2}), of which 22.88 square miles (59.26 km^{2}) is land and 3.37 square miles (8.73 km^{2}) is water. The town stretches inland from Cumberland Foreside, on Casco Bay, to West Cumberland, which borders Windham.

Near the center of the town, there is a small recreational park called Twin Brook. Run and maintained by the town, it is open to cross-country skiers, walkers, and sports practices. Local ballfields at Drowne Road School host the local Little League teams. Knight's Pond Preserve, on the border with North Yarmouth, is home to a pond and a large nature preserve used for recreation year round.

== Demographics ==
Historical population
Census	Pop.	Note	%±
1830	1,558		—
1840	1,616		3.7%
1850	1,656		2.5%
1860	1,713		3.4%
1870	1,626		−5.1%
1880	1,619		−0.4%
1890	1,487		−8.2%
1900	1,404		−5.6%
1910	1,403		−0.1%
1920	1,150		−18.0%
1930	1,378		19.8%
1940	1,491		8.2%
1950	2,030		36.2%
1960	2,765		36.2%
1970	4,096		48.1%
1980	5,284		29.0%
1990	5,836		10.4%
2000	7,159		22.7%
2010	7,211		0.7%
2020	8,473		17.5%
U.S. Decennial Census

=== 2010 census ===
As of the census of 2010, there were 7,211 people, 2,697 households, and 2,079 families living in the town. The population density was 315.2 inhabitants per square mile (121.7/km^{2}). There were 2,902 housing units at an average density of 126.8 per square mile (49.0/km^{2}). The racial makeup of the town was 97.2% White, 0.5% African American, 0.2% Native American, 0.8% Asian, 0.3% from other races, and 1.0% from two or more races. Hispanic or Latino of any race were 1.2% of the population.

There were 2,697 households, of which 37.9% had men under the age of 18 living with them; 67.4% were married couples living together; 6.5% had a female householder with no husband present; 3.2% had a male householder with no wife present;, and 22.9% were non-families. 18.9% of all households were made up of individuals, and 9% had someone living alone who was 65 years of age or older. The average household size was 2.67 and the average family size was 3.06.

The median age in the town was 45 years. 26.9% of residents were under the age of 18; 4.7% were between the ages of 18 and 24; 18.2% were from 25 to 44; 35.6% were from 45 to 64; and 14.5% were 65 years of age or older. The gender makeup of the town was 47.8% male and 52.2% female.

=== 2000 census ===
As of the census of 2000, there were 7,159 people, 2,548 households, and 2,046 families living in the town. The population density was 274.6 inhabitants per square mile (106.0/km^{2}). There were 2,945 housing units at an average density of 112.9 per square mile (43.6/km^{2}). The racial makeup of the town was 98.76% White, 0.14% African American, 0.10% Native American, 0.42% Asian, 0.01% Pacific Islander, 0.13% from other races, and 0.45% from two or more races. Hispanic or Latino of any race were 0.66% of the population.

There were 2,548 households, of which 42.3% had children under the age of 18 living with them; 71.0% were married couples living together; 7.1% had a female householder with no husband present; and 19.7% were non-families. 15.7% of all households were made up of individuals, and 7.2% had someone 65 or older living alone. The average household size was 2.80 and the average family size was 3.14.

In the town, the population was spread out, with 30.4% under the age of 18; 3.6% from 18 to 24; 27.7% from 25 to 44; 27.3% from 45 to 64, and 11.0% who were 65 or older. The median age was 39 years. For every 100 females, there were 93.3 males. For every 100 females age 18 and over, there were 91.4 males.

The median income for a household in the town was $67,556, and the median income for a family was $76,571. Males had a median income of $49,538 versus $37,367 for females. The per capita income for the town was $33,644. About 2.4% of families and 3.0% of the population were below the poverty line, including 0.8% of those under age 18 and 6.2% of those age 65 or over.

== Government and politics ==
Cumberland is an incorporated town governed by a council–manager government.

== Education ==
The school system that serves Cumberland is known as Maine School Administrative District 51 or MSAD 51. There are 3 schools in the district—which also serves North Yarmouth, Maine: the Mabel I. Wilson School, Greely Middle School, and Greely High School. In June 2014, the district closed the North Yarmouth Memorial School and moved into the expanded the Greely Middle School. The Drowne Road School was closed in 2010 due to budget cuts, and the Greely Middle School replaced the Greely Junior High School in 2005. Jeff Porter is the superintendent of the district. The Friends School of Portland, serves grades Pre-K through 8.

== Notable people ==
- Matt Apuzzo, 2012 Pulitzer Prize-winning journalist
- Peter Askim, composer of modern classical music, conductor, music educator
- Joseph Brackett, American songwriter and elder of the Shakers; author of "Simple Gifts"
- Robert G. Dillenback, state legislator
- Toni Fiore, celebrity chef
- William J. Garsoe, state legislator and Maine House Minority Leader
- Hoddy Hildreth, state legislator and conservationist
- Captain Reuben Merrill, sea captain
- Stephen Moriarty, state legislator and attorney
- Katharine Ott, mathematician
- D. P. B. Pride, politician and attorney in Idaho
- Captain Ephraim Sturdivant, namer of and treasurer for Cumberland
- Karl Turner, state legislator
- Oliver Wahlstrom, Professional hockey player, raised in Cumberland
