= Greely High School =

Location
- 303 Main Street; Cumberland, Maine 04021; United States; 43°47′55″N 70°15′17″W

Information
- School type: Public, high school
- Opened: September 28, 1868
- School district: MSAD 51
- Superintendent: Jeff Porter
- School code: 200280
- Chairperson: Kate Perrin, MSAD 51 School Board Chair
- Principal: Donald Gray (Interim)
- Teaching staff: 64 (FTE)
- Grades: 9–12
- Enrollment: 667 (2018–19)
- Student to teacher ratio: 10.42
- Color: Maroon White
- Slogan: Rangers lead the way
- Team name: Greely Rangers
- Newspaper: Greely Times
- Feeder schools: Greely Middle School
- Website: ghs.msad51.org

Greely High School is a public high school for grades 9 to 12 located in Cumberland, Maine, United States. The enrollment is approximately 715 students with a professional teaching staff of 64, 50% of whom have advanced degrees. Greely High School is a part of Maine School Administrative District 51, which serves the towns of Cumberland and North Yarmouth. Renovated and added onto over the years, the building originally opened in 1868. The school completed a 10-million-dollar addition/renovation in 2009. Another addition completed in 2018 added a new auditorium to the school. It adopted the International Baccalaureate (IB) program in 2009.

== History ==
Greely was founded in 1868 with money granted in the will of Eliphalet and Elizabeth Greely. Greely was originally private and known as the Greely Institute until a 1953 town meeting voted to make it a free school.

== Notable alumni ==
- Hanley Denning - Founder of Charity Safe Passage/Camino Segura
- Ben True - Professional runner

== Seal ==
Wooden version of seal

Printed version of seal
