= Maine State Route 26 =

State highway in Maine, US

State Route 26
- Route of SR 26 highlighted in red

Route information
- Maintained by MaineDOT
- Length: 95.90 mi (154.34 km)
- Existed: 1926–present

Major junctions
- South end: Cumberland Avenue in Portland
- I-295 / US 1 in Portland; SR 9 in Portland; I-95 / Maine Turnpike in Falmouth; US 202 / SR 4 / SR 100 / SR 115 in Gray; SR 11 in Poland; US 2 / SR 5 in Bethel
- North end: NH 26 in Cambridge, NH

Location
- Country: United States
- State: Maine
- Counties: Cumberland, Androscoggin, Oxford

Highway system
- Maine State Highway System; Interstate; US; State; Auto trails; Lettered highways
← SR 25	→ SR 27
← Route 25A	N.E.	→ Route 28

State Route 26 (abbreviated SR 26) is part of Maine's system of numbered state highways. It is a major interregional route running for 95.90 miles (154.34 km) from downtown Portland northwest to the New Hampshire border near Upton, where it connects to New Hampshire Route 26. SR 26 runs in Cumberland, Androscoggin and Oxford Counties.

SR 26 is part of a multi-state route with NH 26 and Vermont Route 26, which stretches for a total of 127 miles (204 km).

== History ==
The number 26 dates back to 1922 when the New England road marking system was adopted, although Maine did not officially join until 1925. The road was designated as New England Route 26, also known as the Dixville Notch Way, and largely occupies the same routing as it does today.

== Route description ==
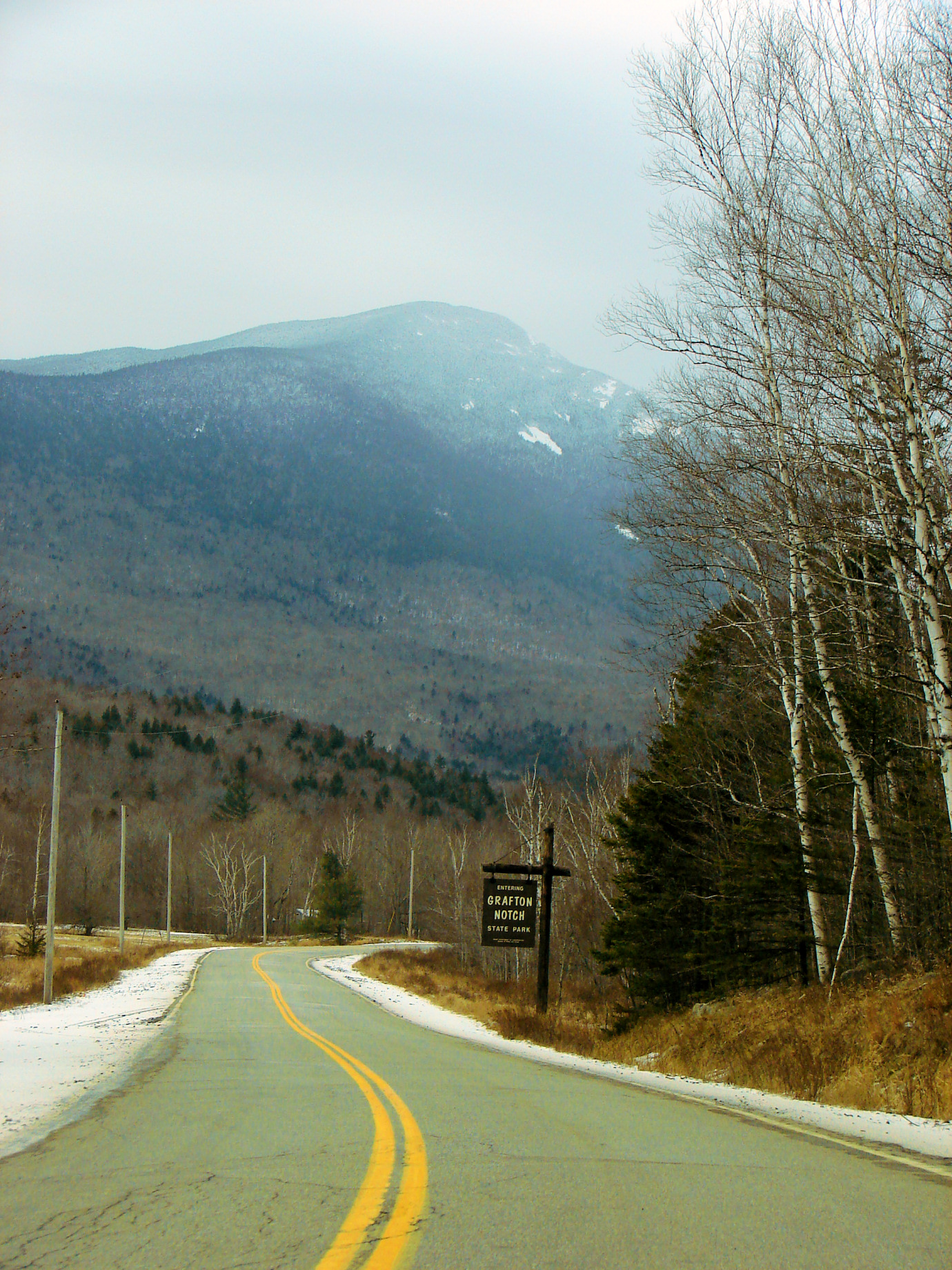
SR 26 at Grafton Notch with Old Speck Mountain in background

SR 26 begins in Portland. State route logs show its southern terminus at the intersection of Cumberland Avenue and Washington Avenue in the eastern end of the city center. It heads north on Washington Avenue. In the field, the southern terminus is signed at the intersection of Congress Street, Washington Avenue, and Mountfort Street in the eastern end of the city center, one block south of the Cumberland Avenue intersection with Washington Avenue. From here, SR 26 follows Washington Avenue northward and joins with I-295 / US 1 over Tukey's Bridge, splitting off immediately on the other side of the bridge to continue northwest on Washington Avenue. SR 100 joins at Allen Avenue, and the two routes turn north onto Auburn Street and continue together as far as the town of Gray. En route, the highway passes through the town of Falmouth, paralleling Interstate 95 (the Maine Turnpike) for the entire 13-mile (21 km) stretch.

In Gray Village, SR 26 and SR 100 intersect with US 202, SR 4 and SR 115 with SR 100 splitting off. The Turnpike begins to turn northeast at Gray, as does SR 100, but SR 26 continues north and then northwest. SR 26 continues north through New Gloucester and Poland, where it intersects SR 11 before passing the Poland Spring Resort. SR 26 continues through western Mechanic Falls, Oxford (where it briefly overlaps with SR 121), eastern Norway and Paris (where it overlaps with SR 117). SR 26 starts to turn northwest as it continues through West Paris and Woodstock en route to Bethel, where it has an interchange with US 2 and SR 5 located near the northern terminus of SR 35. At this interchange, SR 26 turns northward along US 2 and SR 5, forming a three-route concurrency spanning 6 miles (9 km). Immediately after crossing into the town of Newry, SR 26 splits off to the northwest. The highway's northern reaches are in an isolated, mountainous region of the state. After leaving Newry, the highway passes through Grafton Notch State Park, located in the unorganized territory of North Oxford. SR 26 continues through the town of Upton before crossing into Cambridge, New Hampshire, where the highway continues as NH 26 westbound.

== History ==
=== Sabbathday Lake/Shaker Village bypass ===
In 1988, the first attempt was made to modify the existing routing of a 5.25-mile (8.45 km) stretch of SR 26 in the towns of Gray and New Gloucester. The existing roadway ran northward from Gray, hugging the Sabbathday Lake and then passed directly through the Shaker Village en route to New Gloucester, along current Shaker Road and Sabbathday Road. This, along with a second attempt in 1989, was rejected due to disagreement among the public and town officials of how the plan ought to be executed.

Plans were resurrected in 1996 with the formation of a Public Advisory Committee of thirteen members, composed of local citizens, local/regional government officials, and residents of the Shaker Village. Together, the PAC confirmed the existing deficiencies of the road, in particular a section locally known as the "Seven Deadly Curves." This section of the road was notorious for hazardous driving conditions due to lack of shoulders and small lane widths, numerous tight corners, and greatly varied speeds among vehicles traveling along the road. Other deficiencies were also addresses, such as hazards to pedestrians, truck noise and excessive vehicular traffic passing through the Village, and storm/lake water quality concerns.

Several new alignments were proposed for the project, the eventual winner being a southern bypass of the Sabbathday Lake area combined with a northern bypass of the Shaker Village. Two new segments of roadway were to be constructed as part of this new bypass. Environmental clearance was obtained in November 1998, with construction completed by the fall of 2004.

The bypass begins north of Gray, where Shaker Road (SR 26) meets Sabbathday Road. Route 26 splits left along a new alignment which runs for 1.8 miles (2.9 km). Truck lanes were added on uphill climbs to improve traffic flow, and connecting roads from SR 26 provide access to the Sabbathday Lake area. Upon passing west of the lake, SR 26 rejoins its old alignment along former Sabbathday Road, which now dead-ends at its north end. After 0.4 miles (0.64 km), SR 26 once again splits left of Shaker Road, which dead-ends, passing just west of the Village for 0.9 miles (1.4 km), with connecting roads providing access to the Village. Truck lanes are present on this section of road as well. North of the village, SR 26 returns to its old alignment 1.7 miles (2.7 km) south of its junction with SR 122 in Poland.

The SR 26 designation was removed from Shaker Road and Sabbathday Road, which now dead-end and do not directly connect to the bypass. The bypass is known as Maine Street and carries a speed limit of 55 MPH.

== Junction list ==
County	Location	mi	km	Destinations	Notes
Cumberland	Portland	0.0	0.0	SR 77 (State Street)	Southern terminus of SR 26
Cumberland	Portland	0.8	1.3	US 1A (Franklin Street)	
Cumberland	Portland	1.2	1.9	I-295 / US 1 south – South Portland, Scarborough	Southern terminus of I-295/US 1/SR 26 concurrency exit 8 on I-295; southbound exit/northbound entrance Full access via US 1A
Cumberland	Portland	1.6	2.6	I-295 / US 1 north – Falmouth, Gardiner	Northern terminus of I-295/US 1/SR 26 concurrency exit 9 on I-295
Cumberland	Portland	3.7	6.0	SR 100 south (Allen Avenue) to US 302	Southern terminus of SR 26/100 concurrency
Cumberland	Falmouth	6.0	9.7	I-95 / Maine Turnpike – Portland, Augusta	Exit 53 on I-95 / Turnpike
Cumberland	Cumberland			No major junctions	
Cumberland	Gray	16.9	27.2	US 202 / SR 4 / SR 26A north / SR 100 north / SR 115 to I-95 / Maine Turnpike – Windham, Auburn, Yarmouth	Northern terminus of SR 26/100 concurrency Southern terminus of SR 26A
Cumberland	Gray	18.0	29.0	SR 26A south to I-95 / Maine Turnpike – Gray	Northern terminus of SR 26A
Cumberland	New Gloucester			No major junctions	
Androscoggin	Poland	26.3	42.3	SR 122 east (Spring Water Road) – Auburn	Western terminus of SR 122
Androscoggin	Poland	31.7	51.0	SR 11 (Bakerstown Road/South Main Street) – Naples, Mechanic Falls	
Androscoggin	Mechanic Falls			No major junctions	
Oxford	Oxford	36.5	58.7	SR 121 north (Mechanic Falls Road) – Mechanic Falls, Minot	Southern terminus of SR 26/121 concurrency
Oxford	Oxford	37.0	59.5	SR 121 south (King Street) – Oxford, Casco	Northern terminus of SR 26/121 concurrency
Oxford	Norway	45.5	73.2	SR 117 south / SR 118 west (Paris Street) – Norway, Waterford	Southern terminus of SR 26/117 concurrency Eastern terminus of SR 118
Oxford	Paris	46.7	75.2	SR 117 north / SR 119 south (East Main Street) – Buckfield, Hebron	Northern terminus of SR 26/117 concurrency Northern terminus of SR 119
Oxford	West Paris	54.9	88.4	SR 219 west (Main Street) – West Paris, Greenwood	Southern terminus of SR 26/219 concurrency
Oxford	West Paris	55.0	88.5	SR 219 east (North Paris Road) – Sumner, Hartford	Northern terminus of SR 26/219 concurrency
Oxford	Woodstock	60.4	97.2	SR 232 north – Rumford	Southern terminus of SR 232
Oxford	Bethel	70.3	113.1	US 2 west / SR 5 south (West Bethel Road) to SR 35 – Gilead, N.H.	Southern terminus of US 2/SR 5/26 concurrency
Oxford	Newry	76.3	122.8	US 2 east / SR 5 north (Main Street) – Rumford, Andover	Northern terminus of US 2/SR 5/26 concurrency
Oxford	Upton	96.7	155.6	NH 26 west – Errol, Dixville	Continuation into New Hampshire
1.000 mi = 1.609 km; 1.000 km = 0.621 mi: Concurrency terminus; Incomplete access

== State Route 26A ==
State Route 26A
- Location: Gray
- Length: 1.63 mi (2.62 km)
- Existed: 2006–2023

State Route 26A (SR 26A) was a 1.63-mile (2.62 km) bypass of SR 26 opened in 2006 to alleviate congestion in the center of Gray Village where US 202, SR 4, SR 26, SR 100, and SR 115 intersect. Much of the traffic congestion at this village center intersection was due to traffic on SR 26 being forced to pass through this central intersection when accessing and leaving I-95 (Maine Turnpike), which has an interchange just 0.3 miles (0.48 km) to the west. With the bypass, Turnpike traffic to or from points north of Gray no longer has to pass through the village center.

The southern terminus of SR 26A was at the intersection of US 202, SR 4, SR 26, SR 100 and SR 115. SR 26A was cosigned with US 202, SR 4, and SR 115 westbound past the exit 63 Turnpike interchange before turning northward and running parallel to the Turnpike. The highway rejoined SR 26 just south of the Gray-New Gloucester High School. In recognition of the heavy traffic flow of Turnpike access, SR 26 traffic would yield, while SR 26A traffic would continue unimpeded.

The Northbrook Business & Technology Park is located on SR 26A, now SR 26.

In 2023, Route 26A was decommissioned and the route was re-designated as Route 26. Shaker Road, formerly Route 26, became a standard town road, and Route 26 took over the bypass that was formerly 26A.

=== Junction list ===
The entire route is in Gray, Cumberland County.

mi	km	Destinations	Notes
0.00	0.00	US 202 / SR 4 / SR 26 / SR 100 / SR 115 (Yarmouth/Portland/Lewiston Roads)	Southern terminus of SR 26A
0.30	0.48	I-95 / Maine Turnpike – Portland, Auburn	Exit 63 on I-95 (Maine Turnpike)
0.45	0.72	US 202 west / SR 4 north / SR 115 west (West Gray Road) – Windham	Northern terminus of US 202/SR 4/SR 115 concurrency
1.63	2.62	SR 26 (Shaker Road) – New Gloucester, Poland	Northern terminus of SR 26A
1.000 mi = 1.609 km; 1.000 km = 0.621 mi: Concurrency terminus
