= Maine State Route 121 =

State highway in southern Maine, US

State Route 121

Route information
- Maintained by MaineDOT
- Length: 35.69 mi (57.44 km)
- Existed: 1925, 1957 (current alignment)–present

Major junctions
- South end: US 302 / SR 35 in Raymond
- SR 11 in Casco/Mechanic Falls; SR 26 in Oxford; SR 11 / SR 124 in Mechanic Falls; US 202 / SR 100 in Auburn
- North end: US 202 / SR 4 / SR 11 / SR 100 in Auburn

Location
- Country: United States
- State: Maine
- Counties: Cumberland, Oxford, Androscoggin

Highway system
- Maine State Highway System; Interstate; US; State; Auto trails; Lettered highways
← SR 120	→ SR 122

State Route 121 (SR 121) is a 36-mile-long (58 km) state highway in southern Maine. It begins at an intersection with U.S. Route 302 (US 302) and SR 35 in Raymond and ends in Auburn. It is signed as a north-south highway, which accurately reflects its alignment from Raymond to Oxford, but from there it runs almost due east (and slightly south) to its terminus in Auburn. Its overall routing is roughly L-shaped.

== Route description ==
SR 121 begins at an intersection with US 302 and SR 35 in Raymond, not far from the southern terminus of SR 85. It proceeds northward, paralleling SR 85 to the west of Panther Pond until reaching its first intersection with SR 11 in Casco. It continues north along the west side of Pleasant Lake and Thompson Lake before entering Oxford, where it turns to the east to meet SR 26 just south of the Oxford County Regional Airport. SR 121 briefly joins SR 26 in a wrong-way concurrency before splitting off southeast towards Mechanic Falls (continually signed as "north"). It heads into the town center where it meets the southern terminus of SR 124 and SR 11 for a second time. From here to its terminus in Auburn, SR 121 is overlapped by SR 11.

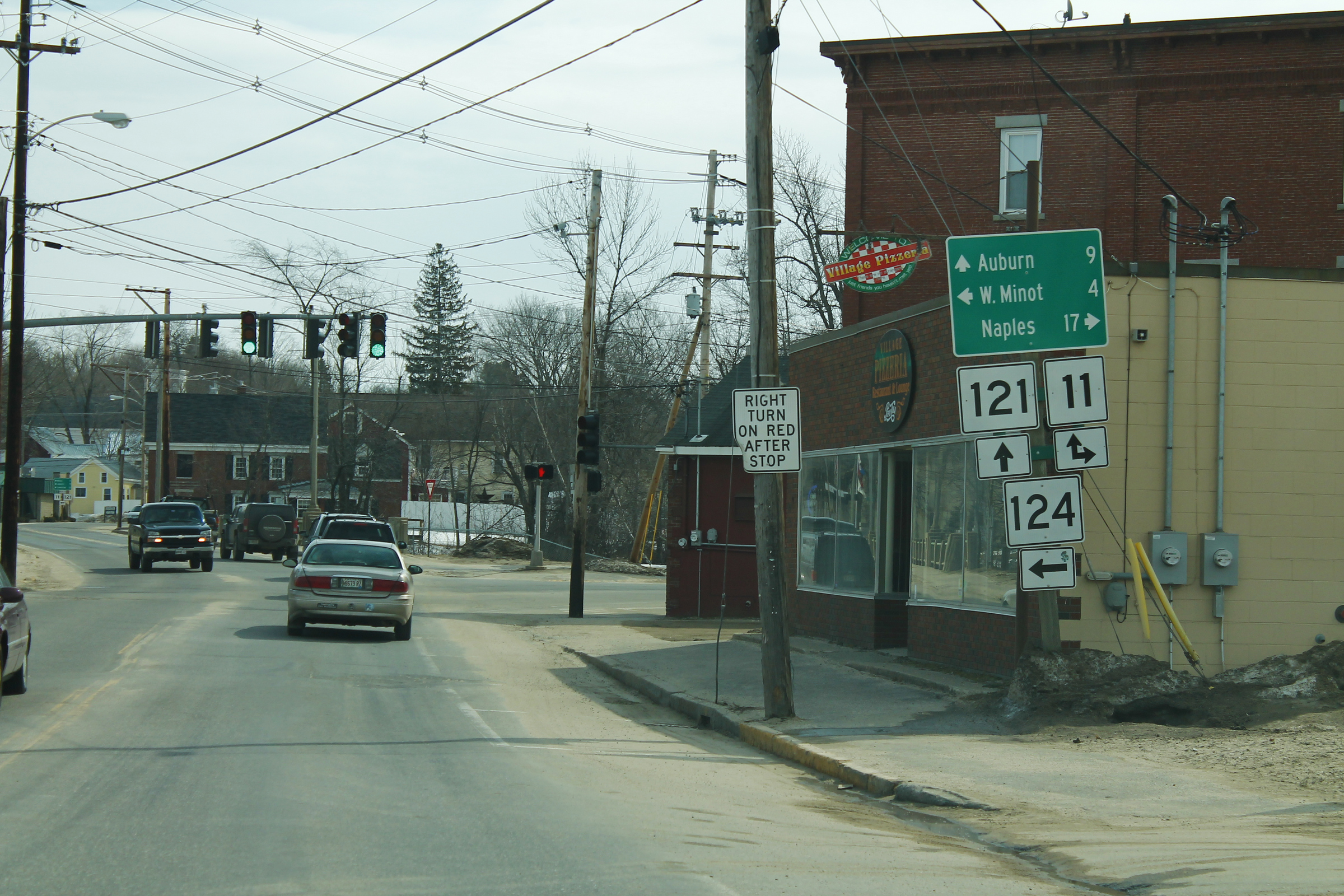
Intersection of SR 121, SR 11, and SR 124 in Mechanic Falls

SR 11 and SR 121 proceed out of town to the southeast (both signed as "north"), meeting the southern terminus of SR 119 before entering Auburn and proceeding towards downtown on Minot Avenue. At the intersection of Minot Avenue and Rotary Street (the latter of which also carries southbound US 202, SR 4, and SR 100 on a one-way pair), SR 11 and SR 121 turn north on Washington Street (joining US 202, SR 4, and SR 100). Prior to 2023, this intersection was signed as the northern terminus of SR 121. Continuing north, Washington Street meets the southbound lanes at Minot Avenue, then reaches the intersection of Court Street, Union Street, and Minot Avenue, where the SR 121 designation officially ends. SR 4 continues straight onto Court Street while US 202, SR 11 and SR 100 turn east onto Union Street towards Lewiston.

== Major intersections ==
County	Location	mi	km	Destinations	Notes
Cumberland	Raymond	0.00	0.00	US 302 / SR 35 (Roosevelt Trail) – Casco, Windham, Naples	Southern terminus
Cumberland	Casco	6.70	10.78	SR 11 (Poland Spring Road) – Naples, Auburn	
Oxford	Oxford	20.89	33.62	SR 26 north (Main Street) – Norway	Southern end of SR 26 concurrency
Oxford	Oxford	21.38	34.41	SR 26 south (Main Street) – Gray	Northern end of SR 26 concurrency
Androscoggin	Mechanic Falls	25.92	41.71	SR 11 south (South Main Street) / SR 124 north (North Main Street) – West Minot, Naples	Southern end of SR 11 concurrency; southern terminus of SR 124
Androscoggin	Minot	29.45	47.40	SR 119 north – Hebron	Southern terminus of SR 119
Androscoggin	Auburn	34.83	56.05	US 202 west / SR 4 south / SR 100 south (Rotary Street) to I-95 / Maine Turnpike	Southern end of US 202/SR 4/SR 100 concurrency
Androscoggin	Auburn	35.69	57.44	US 202 east / SR 11 north / SR 100 north (Court Street) / SR 4 north (Union Street) – Lewiston, Augusta, Farmington	Northern terminus
1.000 mi = 1.609 km; 1.000 km = 0.621 mi: Concurrency terminus
