= Center Meeting House and Common =

Historic church in Maine, United States

- U.S. National Register of Historic Places
- U.S. Historic district
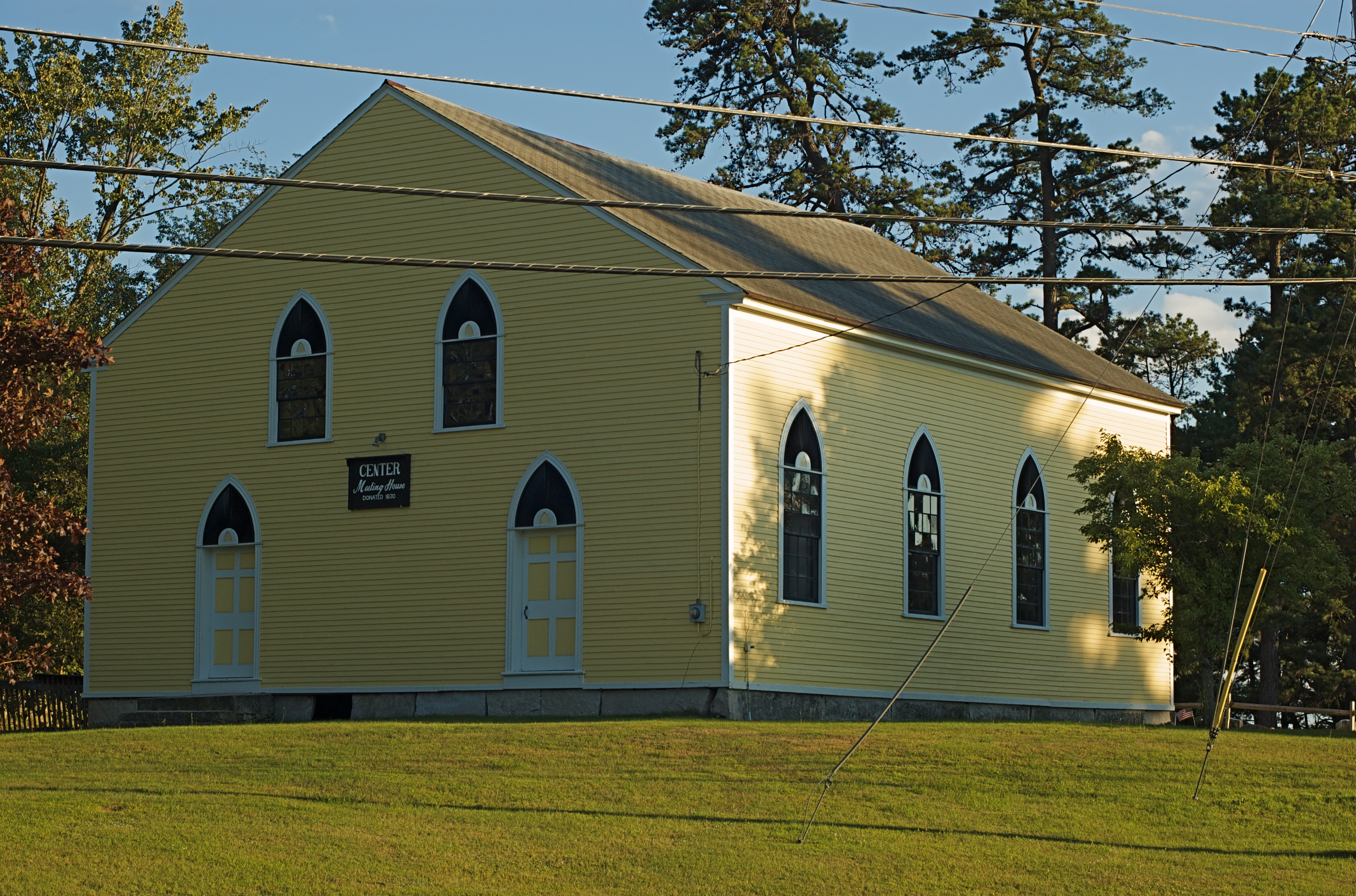

- Location within Maine Location within the United States
- Nearest city: Oxford, Maine
- Coordinates: 44°8′18″N 70°28′18″W
- Area: 1.4 acres (0.57 ha)
- Built: 1829
- Architectural style: Federal, Gothic Revival
- NRHP reference No.: 97000606
- Added to NRHP: June 20, 1997

The Center Meeting House and Common is a historic meeting house at 476 Main Street in Oxford, Maine. The town of Oxford was incorporated in 1829, and the common was laid out soon thereafter. The meeting house, which served as a home for a diversity of religious congregations as well as town meetings, was built in 1830. Significant locally for their cultural and political history, they were listed on the National Register of Historic Places in 1997.

== Description ==
The meeting house is a rectangular wood frame structure with a gable roof, resting on a granite block foundation. It stands on the common, a parcel of land now reduced to 1.35 acres (0.55 ha) from its original 3, near the junction of Maine State Routes 26 and 121. The common is a large grassy area fringed at the non-street edges with mature trees.

The meeting house is sheathed in clapboards, and faces east. Its exterior appearance is fairly typical for Federal styles meeting houses of the period, except that its windows have Gothic Revival lancet point arches. The main facade is symmetrically arranged, with a pair of entry doors, topped by louvered lancet arches with moulded surrounds. There are two sash windows between the doors, and two above, all topped by the similar lancet arches and surrounds. A modern ramp provides handicapped access to the entrances. The side facades have four uniformly-placed windows that are larger (12-over-12 as opposed to 8-over-8) than those on the main facade. The rear facade has a single smaller window, and a modern concrete block chimney.

The entrances lead into a vestibule area spanning the width of the building. A staircase in the northeast corner leads to a balcony space overlooking the nave. The nave takes up most of the building, and is generally divided into three sections of box pews, separated by aisles leading from the vestibule to the pulpit area. The pews all appear to be original, retaining elements such as doors, latches, and even some painted finish. The pulpit area is a flat open space at the rear of the building, which appears to once have had a raised platform.

Originally part of Hebron, Oxford was incorporated in February 1829. Andrew Craigie, owner of a local mill, offered to fund the construction of the meeting house and donated 3 acres (1.2 ha) of land for the common and cemetery (the latter no longer part of this property). The building was used by Congregationalists, Baptists, Methodists, and Free Will Baptists in rotation, as well as by town meetings. It continues to be used for town meetings.

== See also ==
- National Register of Historic Places listings in Oxford County, Maine
