= Maine State Route 124 =

State highway in Maine, US

State Route 124

Route information
- Maintained by MaineDOT
- Length: 12.34 mi (19.86 km)

Major junctions
- South end: SR 11 / SR 121 in Mechanic Falls
- SR 119 in Minot
- North end: SR 117 in Buckfield

Location
- Country: United States
- State: Maine
- Counties: Androscoggin, Oxford

Highway system
- Maine State Highway System; Interstate; US; State; Auto trails; Lettered highways
← SR 123	→ SR 125

State Route 124 (SR 124) is part of Maine's system of numbered state highways, located in Androscoggin and Oxford counties. It runs from Mechanic Falls, passing through the towns of Minot and Hebron, and ends at Buckfield. The route is 12.34 miles (19.86 km) long.

== Route description ==
SR 124 begins at SR 11 and SR 121 at Mechanic Falls. The route heads north towards SR 119 at Minot where it shares a 170-foot-long (52 m) concurrency. After passing SR 119, SR 124 continues heading north towards the town of Hebron. It then goes to Buckfield, where the route ends at SR 117.

== Major junctions ==
County	Location	mi	km	Destinations	Notes
Androscoggin	Mechanic Falls	0.00	0.00	SR 11 / SR 121 (Pleasant Street / South Main Street) – Naples, Auburn, Norway	
Androscoggin	Minot	4.57	7.35	SR 119 north (Woodman Hill Road) – Hebron	Southern end of SR 119 concurrency
Androscoggin	Minot	4.60	7.40	SR 119 south (Woodman Hill Road) – Minot	Northern end of SR 119 concurrency
Oxford	Buckfield	12.34	19.86	SR 117 (Turner Street) / Bryant Road – Turner	
1.000 mi = 1.609 km; 1.000 km = 0.621 mi: Concurrency terminus
