= Maine State Route 119 =

State highway in southwestern Maine, US

State Route 119

Route information
- Maintained by MaineDOT
- Length: 15.1 mi (24.3 km)
- Existed: 1935–present

Major junctions
- South end: SR 11 / SR 121 in Minot
- North end: SR 26 / SR 117 in Paris

Location
- Country: United States
- State: Maine
- Counties: Androscoggin, Oxford

Highway system
- Maine State Highway System; Interstate; US; State; Auto trails; Lettered highways
← SR 118	→ SR 120

State Route 119 (SR 119) is part of Maine's system of numbered state highways, located in the southwestern part of the state. It runs for 15.2 miles (24.5 km) from Minot to Paris. Its southern terminus in Minot is at State Route 11 and State Route 121, and its northern terminus in South Paris is at State Routes 26 and 117. Its northernmost 0.4 miles (0.6 km) are cosigned with SR 117 in a wrong-way concurrency.

== Route description ==
SR 119 begins at Minot Avenue (SR 11 / SR 121) in the town of Minot, located on the Androscoggin River near the border with Auburn. The highway proceeds north through Minot before intersecting with SR 124. The two highways have a brief concurrency before SR 119 turns northwest and enters the town of Hebron. The highway cuts right through the heart of town and continues northwest towards Paris. SR 119 enters Paris from the southeast and heads straight into downtown. Near the center of town, SR 119 intersects SR 117 which approaches from the northeast. The SR 119 designation continues along SR 117 for another 0.4 miles (0.64 km), in a wrong-way concurrency, before reaching SR 26. SR 119 ends while SR 117 turns south along SR 26 towards Norway.

== History ==
When it was first commissioned in 1925, SR 119 occupied a completely different routing than it does today, running from SR 117 in Harrison to SR 118 in Waterford. The route was renumbered to SR 35 when it was first designated in the early 1930s. The current SR 119 from Minot to Paris was designated in 1935 and has not changed since.

== Junction list ==
County	Location	mi	km	Destinations	Notes
Androscoggin	Minot	0.0	0.0	SR 11 / SR 121 (Minot Avenue) – Auburn, Mechanic Falls	Southern terminus of SR 119
Androscoggin	Minot	6.3	10.1	SR 124 (West Minot Road) – Buckfield, Mechanic Falls	
Oxford	Paris	14.7	23.7	SR 117 north (Buckfield Road) – Buckfield, Turner	Southern terminus of SR 117 / SR 119 concurrency
Oxford	Paris	15.1	24.3	SR 26 south / SR 117 south (Main Street) – Norway SR 26 north (Park Street) – West Paris, Woodstock	Northern terminus of SR 119
1.000 mi = 1.609 km; 1.000 km = 0.621 mi: Concurrency terminus
