= Mechanic Falls (CDP), Maine =

Mechanic Falls, Maine
- Census-designated place
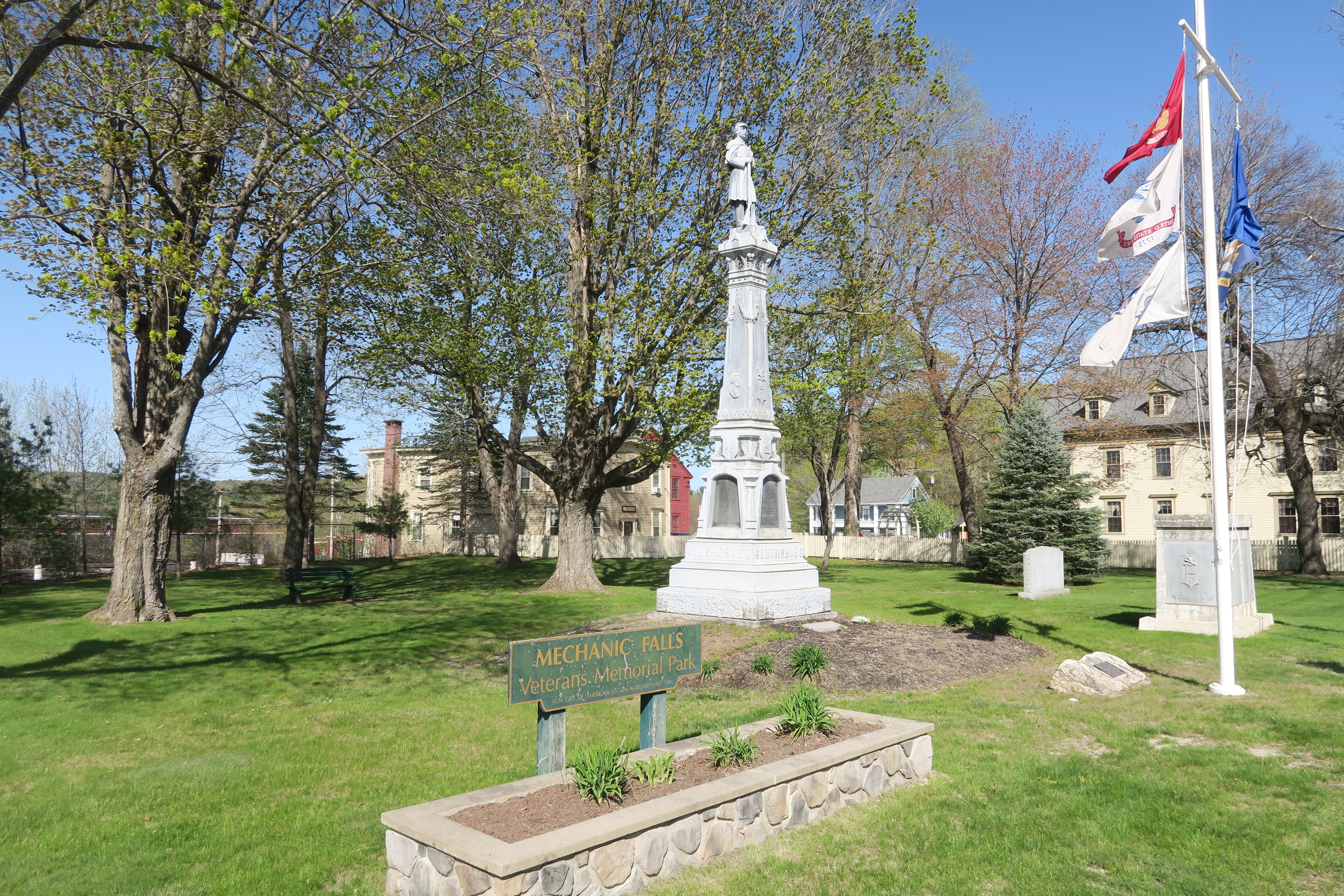
- Veterans Memorial Park

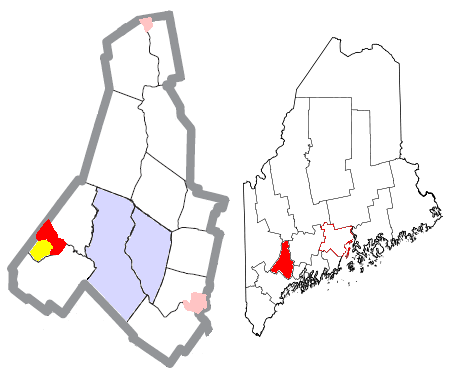
- Location of Mechanic Falls (in red) in Androscoggin County and the state of Maine
- Coordinates: 44°06′44″N 70°23′35″W
- Country: United States
- State: Maine
- County: Androscoggin
- Town: Mechanic Falls

Area
  - Total: 5.47 sq mi (14.18 km^{2})
  - Land: 5.34 sq mi (13.84 km^{2})
  - Water: 0.13 sq mi (0.34 km^{2})
- Elevation: 302 ft (92 m)

Population (2020)
  - Total: 2,257
  - Density: 422.4/sq mi (163.09/km^{2})
- Time zone: UTC-5 (Eastern (EST))
  - Summer (DST): UTC-4 (EDT)
- ZIP code: 04256
- Area code: 207
- FIPS code: 23-44620
- GNIS feature ID: 2377935

Mechanic Falls is a census-designated place (CDP) in the town of Mechanic Falls in Androscoggin County, Maine, United States. The population of the CDP was 2,237 at the 2010 census, out of a total town population of 3,031.

== Geography ==
The Mechanic Falls CDP occupies the eastern half of the town of Mechanic Falls. It lies along the Little Androscoggin River at the intersection of Maine Routes 11, 121, and 124.

According to the United States Census Bureau, the CDP has a total area of 5.5 square miles (14.2 km^{2}), of which 5.3 square miles (13.8 km^{2}) is land and 0.12 square miles (0.3 km^{2}), or 2.37%, is water.

== Demographics ==
Historical population
Census	Pop.	Note	%±
2020	2,257		—
U.S. Decennial Census

As of the census of 2000, there were 2,450 people, 909 households, and 643 families residing in the CDP. The population density was 451.3 inhabitants per square mile (174.2/km^{2}). There were 977 housing units at an average density of 180.0 per square mile (69.5/km^{2}). The racial makeup of the CDP was 97.06% White, 0.61% Black or African American, 0.65% Native American, 0.65% Asian, 0.04% Pacific Islander, 0.08% from other races, and 0.90% from two or more races. Hispanic or Latino of any race were 0.57% of the population.

There were 909 households, out of which 35.9% had children under the age of 18 living with them, 52.8% were married couples living together, 13.0% had a female householder with no husband present, and 29.2% were non-families. 23.0% of all households were made up of individuals, and 10.7% had someone living alone who was 65 years of age or older. The average household size was 2.66 and the average family size was 3.08.

In the CDP, the population was spread out, with 27.7% under the age of 18, 7.7% from 18 to 24, 31.0% from 25 to 44, 21.8% from 45 to 64, and 11.8% who were 65 years of age or older. The median age was 35 years. For every 100 females, there were 92.3 males. For every 100 females age 18 and over, there were 90.6 males.

The median income for a household in the CDP was $33,807, and the median income for a family was $40,063. Males had a median income of $29,432 versus $23,565 for females. The per capita income for the CDP was $14,774. About 11.3% of families and 15.8% of the population were below the poverty line, including 22.1% of those under age 18 and 21.8% of those age 65 or over.

== Tragic 2014 Hayride ==
On October 12, 2014, a Jeep pulling a flatbed Halloween-themed hay ride missed a turn, causing the hayride to go down a hill and crash. One person was killed, with numerous other passengers injured.

The operator's website of the ride billed the adventure as; "....The wagon continues creeping slowly into the darkness. Be ready…as there are spirits and demons lurking around every corner. The demons tend to gather at certain haunts deep in the forest, which unfortunately for those innocent souls aboard the wagon, seem to be located along the logging road..."
