= Maine State Route 122 =

State highway in southern Maine, US

State Route 122

Route information
- Maintained by MaineDOT
- Length: 5.07 mi (8.16 km)
- Existed: 1925–present

Major junctions
- West end: SR 26 in Poland
- East end: US 202 / SR 4 / SR 100 in Auburn

Location
- Country: United States
- State: Maine
- Counties: Androscoggin, Cumberland

Highway system
- Maine State Highway System; Interstate; US; State; Auto trails; Lettered highways
← SR 121	→ SR 123

State Route 122 (abbreviated SR 122) is part of Maine's system of numbered state highways, located in the southern part of the state. The short highway runs for 5.1 miles (8.2 km) and connects SR 26 in Poland to U.S. Route 202 (US 202), SR 4 and SR 100 in Auburn.

== Route description ==
SR 122 begins at an intersection with SR 26 just south of Poland Spring. The route heads east, past the southern edge of Range Ponds State Park and the Poland Spring Resort, before entering the town of New Gloucester in Cumberland County. SR 122 passes through the northern edge of the town before re-entering Androscoggin County and the city of Auburn. SR 122 passes over the Maine Turnpike (Interstate 95) without an interchange, then turns east to end at Danville Junction southwest of the city. Access to the Turnpike is available via the nearby exit 75 interchange with US 202/SR 4/SR 100.

== History ==
SR 122 has retained its routing since its original designation in 1925.

== Junction list ==
County	Location	mi	km	Destinations	Notes
Androscoggin	Poland	0.00	0.00	SR 26 (Maine Street) – Gray, Oxford	
Cumberland	No major junctions				
Androscoggin	Auburn	5.07	8.16	US 202 / SR 4 / SR 100 (Washington Street) to I-95 / Maine Turnpike – New Gloucester, Lewiston	
1.000 mi = 1.609 km; 1.000 km = 0.621 mi
