= West Minot, Maine =

- Village
- Location within Maine
- Coordinates: 44°10′16″N 70°21′57″W
- Country: United States
- State: Maine
- County: Androscoggin
- Elevation: 325 ft (99 m)
- Time zone: UTC-5 (Eastern (EST))
  - Summer (DST): UTC-4 (EDT)
- ZIP code: 04288
- Area code: 207
- GNIS feature ID: 578173

West Minot is an unincorporated village in the town of Minot, Androscoggin County, Maine, United States. It is included in the Lewiston-Auburn, Maine Metropolitan Statistical Area. The community is located at the intersection of Maine State Route 119 and Maine State Route 124, 8.4 miles (13.5 km) northwest of Auburn. West Minot has a post office with ZIP code 04288.
