= Deacon Andrew Dunning House =

Historic house in Maine, United States

- U.S. National Register of Historic Places
- U.S. Historic district
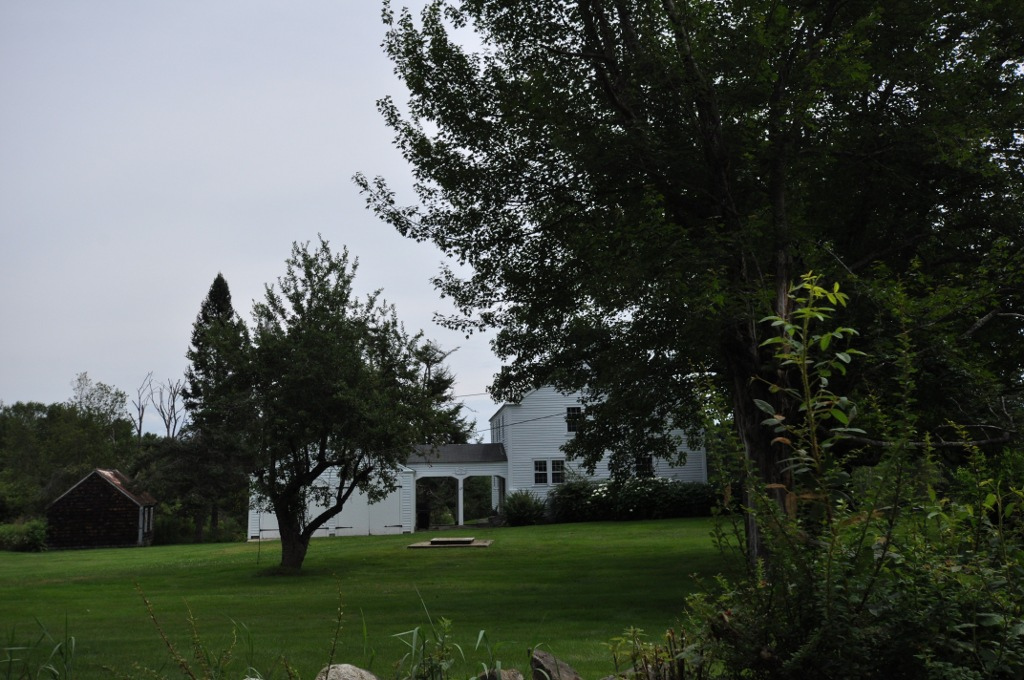

- Location within Maine Location within the United States
- Location: Mountain Rd., 0.6 mi. SE of jct. with ME 123, North Harpswell, Maine
- Coordinates: 43°49′1.5″N 69°57′22.5″W
- Area: 48.5 acres (19.6 ha)
- Built: 1757
- Architectural style: Colonial, Colonial Revival
- NRHP reference No.: 99001188
- Added to NRHP: October 8, 1999

The Deacon Andrew Dunning House is a historic house on Mountain Road in North Harpswell, Maine. Built about 1757 by one of Harpswell's early settlers, it is one of the town's oldest buildings. It was also the subject of a well-meaning but ill-informed Colonial Revival "restoration" in the 1940s, illustrating some of the issues with those types of actions. The property, which includes the Dunning family cemetery, was listed on the National Register of Historic Places in 1999.

== Description and history ==
The Dunning House stands on a parcel of more than 48 acres (19 ha) of land on the east side of the main Harpswell peninsula, just south of Mountain Road near its crossing to the town's eastern peninsula. Most of this land, which has always been historically associated with the house, is wooded, with a roughly 5-acre (2.0 ha) area of meadow surrounding the house, which is accessed by a private lane (Old Dunning Road) to its west. The house is a 2 1/2-story wood-frame structure, three bays wide, with a single central chimney, side-gable roof, clapboard siding, and stone foundation. Its main facade faces south, and has an enclosed gabled center entrance vestibule. The flanking sash windows on the first floor are place slightly irregularly, while those on the second floor, which are slightly smaller, have more regular positioning. It is not known if these window positions are original. The window positions on the east side appear to be original, although the windows themselves date to the 19th and 20th centuries. A breezeway extends from the rear of the house, connecting it to a two-bay garage with two-leaf swinging doors.

The house was built c. 1757–60 by Andrew Dunning, originally from York, Maine, and is one of the town's oldest surviving buildings. Dunning was prominent in local civic affairs, serving as town selectman, town clerk, and deacon of the church for many years. The house was owned by Dunning's descendants until 1871, acquiring over time a number of additions and alterations, including gables in the roof, a two-story addition, and a porch across the front facade. Abandoned for many years, it was acquired in 1946 by a Gorham couple, who engaged in a "restoration" in which they sought to return the house to its 18th-century appearance. The accumulated alterations (some of which were documented in a pen-and-ink sketch dating to 1878) were removed, and the breezeway and garage added. Interior elements of the restoration included the reuse of wood paneling from another period Harpswell house (which was demolished) in some of the downstairs rooms. The restoration was the subject of media interest, receiving press coverage that included "before and after" photography.

== See also ==
- National Register of Historic Places listings in Cumberland County, Maine
