= Maine State Route 11 =

North-south state highway in Maine, US

State Route 11
- Route of SR 11 highlighted in red, SR 11A in blue, SR 11B in green

Route information
- Maintained by MaineDOT
- Length: 400.93 mi (645.23 km)
- Existed: 1926–present

Major junctions
- South end: US 202 / NH 11 in Rochester, NH
- US 302 / SR 35 / SR 114 in Naples; I-95 / Maine Turnpike in Augusta; US 201 / US 202 / SR 8 / SR 17 / SR 27 / SR 100 in Augusta; SR 3 in Augusta; I-95 in Waterville; US 201 / SR 100 / SR 104 in Waterville; I-95 in Palmyra; US 2 / SR 7 / SR 100 in Newport; SR 15 in Corinth/Charleston; SR 6 / SR 16 in Milo
- North end: US 1 / SR 161 in Fort Kent

Location
- Country: United States
- State: Maine
- Counties: York, Cumberland, Androscoggin, Kennebec, Somerset, Waldo, Penobscot, Piscataquis, Aroostook

Highway system
- Maine State Highway System; Interstate; US; State; Auto trails; Lettered highways
← SR 10	→ SR 15
← SR 210	→ SR 212

State Route 11 (SR 11) is a state highway in the U.S. state of Maine. It is a major interregional route which runs nearly the entire length of the state from south to north. The southern terminus of SR 11 is at the New Hampshire state line in Lebanon, where it connects to New Hampshire Route 11. The northern terminus is at U.S. Route 1 (US 1) and SR 161 in Fort Kent, near the Canada–US border. The highway travels through York, Cumberland, Androscoggin, Kennebec, Somerset, Waldo, Penobscot, Piscataquis and Aroostook counties. At 400.93 miles (645.23 km) in length, SR 11 is the longest state highway in Maine by a wide margin. However, it is not the longest numbered route in Maine, as US 1 runs for over 526 miles (847 km) in the state.

SR 11, together with NH 11 and Vermont Route 11, forms a continuous multi-state route across northern New England that stretches for over 550 miles (890 km) from Manchester, Vermont to Fort Kent, Maine.

== History ==
=== 1925: New England Interstate Route 11 ===

The number 11 dates back to 1922 when the New England road marking system was adopted, although Maine did not take part until 1925. New England Route 11 was known as the Manchester-Biddeford Route, as it began in Manchester, Vermont and ended in Biddeford, Maine. The Maine section of Route 11 ran for 29 miles (47 km). It followed the current routing of US 202/SR 11 between Lebanon and downtown Sanford, continued northeast into Alfred along modern US 202, then through Lyman and Arundel along modern SR 111 to terminate at Route 1 (the modern intersection of US 1 and SR 111) in Biddeford.

=== 1926: State Route designation ===
In 1926, the U.S. Numbered Highway System was established and superseded the New England Interstate system. Some of the New England Interstate routes were integrated into the new system (such as Route 1, which became part of US 1). Route 11 did not become a U.S. Highway but was one of several that were redesignated as state highways and kept their existing numbers. State Route 11 was officially designated in 1926 and kept its existing routing until 1933.

=== 1933-34: Renumbering and extension ===
==== Interregional route experiment ====
In 1931, the Maine State Highway Commission conducted an experiment in which it designated a new low-numbered state highway (SR 4) which ran mostly on existing alignments of the original 1925 intrastate routes (which were all numbered 100 and higher to avoid conflicts with the New England Interstate routes) and replaced several of the original numbers along those alignments. This effectively created a long interregional route that covered an important travel corridor between the New Hampshire and Canadian borders, all with a single route number.

This experiment proved to be a success, and the SHC decided to expand the interregional route system across the entire state highway system using low route numbers, including those from the original New England routes. Three-digit route numbers (and larger two-digit numbers) would be used to fill in shorter alignments to complement the interregional routes. This process began in 1933 and was finished in 1934. Many of the existing 1925 routes were truncated, overlapped with the new routes, or eliminated altogether. Routes which were completely eliminated generally had their numbers reassigned somewhere else in the system. By the time the renumbering project was finished, SR 11 was extended to 400 miles (640 km).

==== Changes to SR 11 ====
The original routing of SR 11 from the New Hampshire state line to downtown Sanford was maintained (and was overlapped by the newly designated US 202 in 1936). The SR 11 designation was dropped from the section between Sanford and Alfred, as it had already been made part of the new SR 4 in 1931 (and is now US 202/SR 4A) and the remaining segment east of Alfred was given the new SR 111 designation.

From downtown Sanford, SR 11 was cosigned with SR 109 into Shapleigh, completely replaced former SR 203 between Shapleigh and West Newfield, and replaced most of SR 110 from Newfield to Limington, where SR 11 crosses SR 25 today. New routing was used between Limington and Standish, then SR 11 was cosigned with SR 113 in Standish and Baldwin as it continues to be today. SR 11 used another section of new routing to reach Sebago, then was cosigned along the northern part of SR 114 to that route's terminus in Naples. SR 11 replaced former SR 116 between Sebago and Mechanic Falls (part of which is now overlapped by US 302 and SR 35), then was cosigned with SR 121 to that route's terminus in Auburn.

Between Auburn and Augusta, SR 11 was cosigned with SR 100 (which had just recently been extended as it too was intended to be a major interregional state highway). North of Augusta, SR 11 was routed onto an old alignment of SR 100 to Waterville (which is now part of SR 104). The highway then used new routing between Waterville and Corinth, part of which was shared with the newly designated SR 43. SR 11 was then cosigned with the newly designated SR 15 to Charleston, then split off on new routing as far as Lagrange, where it met up with SR 100 (modern SR 155).

SR 11 was cosigned with SR 100 (modern SR 155) between Lagrange and Howland, then with US 2 between Howland and Mattawamkeag, and finally with SR 157 between Mattawamkeag and Medway. SR 11 replaced former State Route 211 which ran between Medway and Sherman (near where exit 264 on I-95 is now located), and finally replaced nearly the entire length of SR 158 from Sherman to Fort Kent, terminating at US 1 and SR 161 as it does today.

== Junction list ==
County	Location	mi	km	Destinations	Notes
York	Lebanon	0.00	0.00	US 202 west / NH 11 west (Highland Street) – Rochester	Continuation into New Hampshire
York	Sanford	9.14	14.71	SR 11A north (Oak Street) – Springvale	Southern terminus of SR 11A (southern segment)
York	Sanford	12.50	20.12	US 202 east / SR 4A north (Winter Street) – Alfred SR 4A south / SR 109 south (Main Street) – Wells	Northern terminus of US 202 concurrency, southern terminus of SR 109 concurrency
York	Sanford	14.54	23.40	SR 11A south (Oak Street) – Lebanon SR 224 east (Bridge Street) – Alfred	Village of Springvale; northern terminus of SR 11A (southern segment), western terminus of SR 224
York	Shapleigh	18.70	30.09	SR 109 north – Acton	Northern terminus of SR 109 concurrency
York	Newfield	29.34	47.22	SR 110 west (Wakefield Road) – West Newfield	Eastern terminus of SR 110
York	Limerick	36.61	58.92	SR 5 south (Main Street) – Waterboro	Southern terminus of SR 5 concurrency
York	Limerick	36.76	59.16	SR 5 north (Main Street) to SR 160 – Cornish	Northern terminus of SR 5 concurrency
York	Limington	42.68	68.69	SR 117 (Cape Road) – Cornish, Hollis	
York	Limington	44.61	71.79	SR 25 (Ossipee Trail) – Kezar Falls, Cornish, Standish	
Cumberland	Standish	48.37	77.84	SR 113 south (Pequawket Trail) – Standish	Village of Steep Falls; southern terminus of SR 113 concurrency
Cumberland	Baldwin	49.85	80.23	SR 113 north (Pequawket Trail) – Fryeburg SR 107 begins	Northern terminus of SR 113 concurrency, southern terminus of SR 107
Cumberland	Baldwin	51.65	83.12	SR 107 north (Bridgton Road) – Sebago	Northern terminus of SR 107 concurrency
Cumberland	Sebago	54.24	87.29	SR 114 south (Sebago Road) – East Sebago	Southern terminus of SR 114 concurrency
Cumberland	Naples	63.59	102.34	US 302 west (Roosevelt Trail) – Bridgton SR 114 ends	Southern terminus of US 302 concurrency, northern terminus of SR 114
Cumberland	Naples	64.07	103.11	SR 35 north (Harrison Road) – Harrison, Waterford	Southern terminus of SR 35 concurrency
Cumberland	Naples	64.96	104.54	US 302 east / SR 35 south (Roosevelt Trail) – Raymond, Windham, Portland	Northern terminus of US 302/SR 35 concurrency
Cumberland	Casco	68.97	111.00	SR 121 (Meadow Road) – Oxford, Raymond, Windham	
Cumberland	Casco	71.20	114.59	SR 85 south (Webbs Mills Road) – Raymond	Northern terminus of SR 85
Androscoggin	Poland	78.43	126.22	SR 26 (Maine Street/Pigeon Hill Road) – Oxford, Norway, Gray	
Androscoggin	Mechanic Falls	81.26	130.78	SR 121 south – Oxford, Norway SR 124 north (North Main Street) – West Minot	Southern terminus of SR 121 concurrency, southern terminus of SR 124
Androscoggin	Minot	84.79	136.46	SR 119 north – Hebron	Southern terminus of SR 119
Androscoggin	Auburn	90.16	145.10	US 202 west / SR 4 south / SR 100 south (Washington Street) to I-95 / Maine Turnpike – Portland SR 121 ends	Rotary; southern terminus of US 202/SR 4/SR 100 concurrency, northern terminus of SR 121
Androscoggin	Auburn	91.03	146.50	SR 4 north (Union Street) – Farmington	Northern terminus of SR 4 concurrency
Androscoggin	Auburn	91.37	147.05	SR 136 south (Main Street)	Northern terminus of SR 136
Androscoggin	Lewiston	91.74	147.64	SR 196 east (Canal Street/Lisbon Street)	Western terminus of SR 196
Androscoggin	Lewiston	91.97	148.01	SR 126 east (Sabattus Street) – Sabattus	Western terminus of SR 126
Androscoggin	Lewiston	92.85	149.43	Russell Street– To SR 4 / SR 126 / SR 196 – Auburn, Lisbon	Interchange
Androscoggin	Leeds	103.71	166.91	SR 106 north – North Leeds	Southern terminus of SR 106
Kennebec	Monmouth	107.81	173.50	SR 132 south (Main Street) – Monmouth	Northern terminus of SR 132
Kennebec	Winthrop	111.25	179.04	SR 41 north / SR 133 north (Western Avenue) – Winthrop Downtown, Readfield	Interchange; Southern terminus of SR 41/SR 133
Kennebec	Winthrop	114.22	183.82	SR 135 north (Stanley Road) – Readfield, Belgrade	Southern terminus of SR 135 concurrency
Kennebec	Winthrop	114.34	184.01	SR 135 south (Winthrop Center Road) – East Monmouth	Northern terminus of SR 135 concurrency
Kennebec	Manchester	117.57	189.21	SR 17 west (Readfield Road) – Readfield	Western terminus of SR 17 concurrency
Kennebec	Augusta	120.22	193.48	I-95 / Maine Turnpike – Portland, Bangor	Exit 109 on I-95; northern terminus of Maine Turnpike
Kennebec	Augusta	121.93	196.23	US 201 south / SR 27 south (State Street) – Gardiner, Hallowell US 201 north / US 202 east / SR 17 east / SR 100 north to SR 3 – Waterville, Rockland, Belfast SR 8 begins	Rotary; northern terminus of US 202/SR 17/SR 100 concurrency, southern terminus of SR 27 concurrency, southern terminus of SR 8
Kennebec	Augusta	122.72	197.50	SR 104 north (Bond Street) – Sidney	Southern terminus of SR 104
Kennebec	Augusta	124.96	201.10	I-95 to Maine Turnpike – Portland, Lewiston, Waterville	Exit 112 on I-95
Kennebec	Augusta	126.79	204.05	SR 3 east (Old Belgrade Road) to I-95 – Belfast	Western terminus of SR 3
Kennebec	Sidney	128.58	206.93	SR 23 north (Pond Road) – Oakland	Southern terminus of SR 23
Kennebec	Belgrade	133.77	215.28	SR 27 north (Augusta Road) – Belgrade Lakes, Farmington	Northern terminus of SR 27 concurrency
Kennebec	Belgrade	134.19	215.96	SR 135 south (Cemetery Road) – Belgrade Lakes, Readfield	Northern terminus of SR 135
Kennebec	Belgrade	136.94	220.38	SR 8 north (Smithfield Road) – North Belgrade, Smithfield	Northern terminus of SR 8 concurrency
Kennebec	Oakland	141.91	228.38	SR 23 (Summer Street/Water Street) – Sidney	
Kennebec	Oakland	142.36	229.11	SR 137 west (Oak Street) – Smithfield	Southern terminus of SR 137 concurrency
Kennebec	Oakland	142.63	229.54	SR 23 (Oakland Road/Fairfield Street) – Fairfield Center	
Kennebec	Waterville	144.43	232.44	I-95 – Newport, Bangor, Augusta	Exit 127 on I-95
Kennebec	Waterville	146.00	234.96	SR 104 south (W. River Road)	Southern terminus of SR 104 concurrency
Kennebec	Waterville	146.06	235.06	SR 137 east (Silver Street) to US 201 – China SR 137 Bus. begins	Northern terminus of SR 137 concurrency; southern terminus of SR 137 Bus.
Kennebec	Waterville	146.78	236.22	SR 137 Bus. (Silver Street) – Winslow	Northern terminus of SR 137 Bus. concurcurrency
Kennebec	Waterville	147.32	237.09	US 201 south / SR 100 south (Main Street) SR 104 north (Main Street)	US 201/SR 100 one-way southbound on Main Street; southern terminus of US 201/SR 100 concurrency, northern terminus of SR 104 concurrency
Kennebec	Waterville	147.66	237.64	US 201 / SR 100 (Front Street)	Northbound US 201/SR 100 join from one-way Front Street
Somerset	Fairfield	150.46	242.14	US 201 north / SR 139 west (Upper Main Street)	Northern terminus of US 201 concurrency, southern terminus of SR 139 concurrency
Kennebec	Benton	152.61	245.60	SR 100A south (Clinton Avenue) – Winslow	Northern terminus of SR 100A
Kennebec	Benton	152.67	245.70	SR 139 east (Sebasticook Bridge Road) – Unity, Albion	Northern terminus of SR 139 concurrency
Kennebec	Clinton	156.87	252.46	Baker Street/Hinckley Road– To I-95	To Exit 138 on I-95
Somerset	Pittsfield	169.89	273.41	SR 69 east (Hunnewell Avenue) – Detroit	Western terminus of SR 69
Somerset	Pittsfield	169.96	273.52	SR 152 north (Somerset Avenue) to I-95 – Hartland	Southern terminus of SR 152
Somerset	Palmyra	173.95	279.95	SR 220 south (Hurds Corner Road) – Detroit	Northern terminus of SR 220
Somerset	Palmyra	176.27	283.68	I-95 – Waterville, Bangor	Exit 157 on I-95
Penobscot	Newport	176.67	284.32	US 2 / SR 7 south / SR 100 north (Main Street) – Skowhegan, Sugarloaf, Newport	Rotary; northern terminus of SR 100 concurrency, southern terminus of SR 7 concurrency
Penobscot	Corinna	182.81	294.20	SR 43 west (St. Albans Road) – St. Albans	Southern terminus of SR 43 concurrency
Penobscot	Corinna	182.88	294.32	SR 7 north (Dexter Road) – Dexter, Moosehead Lake Region SR 222 east (Stetson Road) – Stetson	Northern terminus of SR 7 concurrency, western terminus of SR 222
Penobscot	Corinth	197.01	317.06	SR 94 west (Garland Road) – Garland	Eastern terminus of SR 94
Penobscot	Corinth	198.64	319.68	SR 15 south (Main Street) – Kenduskeag	Southern terminus of SR 15 concurrency
Penobscot	Corinth	198.76	319.87	SR 43 east (Hudson Road) – Hudson	Northern terminus of SR 43 concurrency
Penobscot	Charleston	200.46	322.61	SR 15 north (Dover Road) – Dover-Foxcroft	Northern terminus of SR 15 concurrency
Penobscot	Charleston	202.17	325.36	SR 11A north (Main Road) – Atkinson	Southern terminus of SR 11A (northern segment)
Penobscot	Bradford	207.04	333.20	SR 221 south – Hudson SR 155 north (East Road) – Bradford	Northern terminus of SR 221, southern terminus of SR 155
Penobscot	Bradford	209.24	336.74	SR 11A south (Upper Charleston Road) – Charleston	Northern terminus of SR 11A (northern segment)
Piscataquis	Milo	219.32	352.96	SR 6 east / SR 16 east (Elm Street) – Orono	Southern terminus of SR 6/SR 16 concurrency
Piscataquis	Milo	221.56	356.57	SR 6 west / SR 16 west (West Main Street) – Dover-Foxcroft	Northern terminus of SR 6/SR 16 concurrency
Penobscot	Millinocket	260.19	418.74	SR 11B (Poplar Street) / Katahdin Avenue	Unsigned southern terminus of SR 11B
Penobscot	Millinocket	260.52	419.27	SR 157 begins (Central Street); Katahdin Avenue – Baxter State Park	Western terminus of SR 157
Penobscot	Millinocket	260.71	419.57	SR 11B (Penobscot Avenue)	Northern terminus of SR 11B, signed in southbound direction only
Penobscot	Medway	270.39	435.15	SR 116 south (Pattagumpus Road) – Woodville, Chester	Northern terminus of SR 116
Penobscot	Medway	271.12	436.33	SR 157 east (Medway Road) – Mattawamkeag	Eastern terminus of SR 157 concurrency
Aroostook	Sherman	296.11	476.54	SR 158 east (Main Street) to I-95 – Sherman	Western terminus of SR 158, to Exit 264 on I-95
Penobscot	Patten	305.03	490.90	SR 159 east (Houlton Street) to I-95 – Island Falls	Southern terminus of SR 159 concurrency; to Exit 276 on I-95
Penobscot	Patten	305.46	491.59	SR 159 west (Shin Pond Road) – Shin Pond, Baxter State Park	Northern terminus of SR 159 concurrency
Aroostook	Moro Plantation	321.32	517.11	SR 212 east to I-95 – Smyrna, Houlton	Western terminus of SR 212, to Exit 286 on I-95
Aroostook	Ashland	352.38	567.10	SR 163 east (Presque Isle Road) – Presque Isle	Western terminus of SR 163
Aroostook	Ashland	352.67	567.57	SR 227 east (Frenchville Road) – Presque Isle	Western terminus of SR 227
Aroostook	Fort Kent	400.93	645.23	US 1 / SR 161 (Main Street) – Clair NB, Allagash, Van Buren	Northern terminus of SR 11
1.000 mi = 1.609 km; 1.000 km = 0.621 mi: Concurrency terminus; Incomplete access; Tolled

== Alternate routes ==
=== State Route 11A ===
There are two separate highways in Maine designated SR 11A. Although they share a route number, they are located over 180 miles (290 km) apart on SR 11.

State Route 11A
- Location: Sanford
- Length: 3.27 mi (5.26 km)
- Existed: 1931–present

==== Southern segment ====
The southern segment of SR 11A is located in York County, entirely within the city of Sanford, and is 3.27 miles (5.26 km) in length. Locally it is known as Oak Street. The route was designated in 1931 as a bypass of the downtown area. Its southern terminus is at US 202 and SR 11 west of downtown and its northern terminus is at the intersection with Main Street (SR 11/SR 109) and Bridge Street (SR 224) north of downtown.

===== Junction list =====
The entire route is in Sanford, York County.

mi	km	Destinations	Notes
0.00	0.00	US 202 / SR 11 (Carl Broggi Highway) – Lebanon, Rochester NH	Southern terminus
3.27	5.26	SR 11 / SR 109 (Main Street) – Lebanon, Acton, Shapleigh SR 224 east (Bridge Street) – Alfred	Northern terminus
1.000 mi = 1.609 km; 1.000 km = 0.621 mi

==== Northern segment ====
State Route 11A
- Location: Charleston–Bradford
- Length: 6.61 mi (10.64 km)
- Existed: c. 1985–present

SR 11A is 6.61-mile-long (10.64 km) loop of SR 11 located in Penobscot County. It is a former alignment of both SR 11 and SR 15. SR 11A directly serves the town of Charleston, which modern SR 11 bypasses to the south. The southern terminus is at SR 11 in Charleston and the northern terminus is at SR 11 in the neighboring town of Bradford. The road is known locally as Main Road and Upper Charleston Road.

The route currently occupied by SR 11A was originally designated as part of SR 15 in 1926. When SR 11 was extended in 1933-1934, it was cosigned with SR 15 along this stretch of road, intersecting with SR 221 north of downtown Bradford. SR 221 was truncated from its former terminus in Brownville to this junction. In 1960, SR 15 was moved onto a more heavily utilized western bypass of Charleston, splitting from SR 11 further south of town and leaving the section through downtown Charleston signed solely as SR 11. Between 1984 and 1985, SR 11 was moved onto a new alignment which bypassed Charleston to the south, traveled due east into downtown Bradford where it intersected with SR 155 and SR 221, and was cosigned with SR 221 north to rejoin with the existing alignment north of town. At that time, the orphaned route through downtown Charleston was designated as SR 11A.

SR 221 no longer connects directly to SR 11A as it was further truncated to its junction with SR 11 and SR 155 in downtown Bradford between 2007 and 2011.

===== Junction list =====
The entire route is in Penobscot County.

Location	mi	km	Destinations	Notes
Charleston	0.00	0.00	SR 11 (Main Road/Bradford Road) – Bradford, Bradford Center	Southern terminus
Bradford	6.61	10.64	SR 11 (Main Road) – Milo	Northern terminus
1.000 mi = 1.609 km; 1.000 km = 0.621 mi

=== State Route 11B ===
State Route 11B
- Location: Millinocket
- Length: 0.31 mi (500 m)
- Existed: c. 2014–present

SR 11B is a 0.31-mile-long (0.50 km) business route of SR 11 in Millinocket. Most of the route travels from north to south along one-way Penobscot Avenue through the central business district of the town. It begins at the intersection of Central Street (SR 11/SR 157) and Penobscot Avenue, travels south to Poplar Street, then turns west along Poplar Street and becomes a two-way street for one block before ending at Katahdin Avenue (SR 11).

Signage is only posted in the westbound or southbound direction on SR 11/SR 157, and on SR 11B itself. SR 11B is not signed with directional banners as it is only designed to be driven in one direction. No signage is posted along SR 11 at Poplar Street or Katahdin Avenue at SR 11B's southern end; northbound traffic is directed to continue on SR 11 into downtown. Signage for the route appears to have been installed between 2007 and 2014.

==== Junction list ====
Mileage in the state route log increases from north to south, as the route can only be driven in that direction.

The entire route is in Millinocket, Penobscot County.

mi	km	Destinations	Notes
0.00	0.00	SR 11 / SR 157 (Central Street)	Northern terminus
0.31	0.50	SR 11 (Poplar Street/Katahdin Avenue) – Brownville	Southern terminus
1.000 mi = 1.609 km; 1.000 km = 0.621 mi

== See also ==
- Route 11 (New England)
