= Sturtevant Hall =

- U.S. National Register of Historic Places
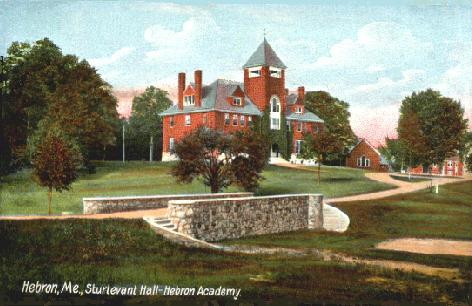

- Location within Maine Location within the United States
- Location: ME 119, Hebron, Maine
- Coordinates: 44°12′2″N 70°24′34″W
- Area: 1 acre (0.40 ha)
- Built: 1891
- Architect: John Calvin Stevens
- Architectural style: Colonial Revival, Romanesque
- NRHP reference No.: 77000079
- Added to NRHP: September 19, 1977

Sturtevant Hall is a historic academic building on the campus of Hebron Academy in Hebron, Maine. Built in 1891, this Romanesque and Colonial Revival brick building is an elegant design of Maine architect, John Calvin Stevens. It is one of the main focal points of the school's modern campus, and was listed on the National Register of Historic Places in 1977.

== Architecture ==
The hall is a large 2-1/2 story red brick structure, with a hip roof and resting on a raised cut stone foundation. The building is visually dominated by a four-story tower, which has an open belfry topped by a pyramidal roof. The main entry is in the base of the tower, with a triple window above, and a Palladian window in the third level. The hall's shape is basically rectangular, with pairs of chimneys at each end, and gabled dormers in each roof section. As designed by Stevens, the building's interior included an assembly hall, a library, seven classrooms, a science lab, and music and art studios.

Hebron Academy was established in 1804, and is one of the oldest University-preparatory schools in the country. By the 1880s its existing facilities were recognized as inadequate, and the school began fundraising for a building campaign. Its single largest donor was Benjamin Sturtevant, for whom this hall and Sturtevant House (built 1900) are named. Stevens, a prolific and influential architect based in Portland, designed this hall and three other buildings now standing on the academy's campus.

== See also ==
- National Register of Historic Places listings in Oxford County, Maine
