= Hill Ridge =

Geological feature in Maine, US

Coordinates: 44°09′31″N 70°07′40″W

Hill Ridge (elevation: 696 feet (212 m)) is a ridge in Androscoggin County, Maine, in the United States.

Hill Ridge was named after Nathaniel Hill, a pioneer who settled there.
