= Androscoggin Creature =

Controversial dog found dead in 2006

The Androscoggin Creature was a dog that was found dead in Turner, Maine in Androscoggin County, Maine in August 2006. Its canine nature was initially unclear. Lewiston Sun Journal reporter Mark LaFlamme described it on August 16, 2006 in an article titled “Mysterious Beast” and made a connection from the unidentified animal to local lore: "[the animal] may be the mystery creature that has roamed the area for years, mauling dogs and frightening residents. Or it could be a dog that has been running wild in the woods". The Maine Warden Service did not investigate the remains, and they did not conduct genetic tests despite requests from witnesses.

In August 2006, samples from the carcass were submitted for genetic analysis. A November 2007 profile of University of Maine professor Irv Kornfield in the Sun Journal reported that Kornfield had sequenced DNA from the specimen and compared it with genetic sequences from other animals. The profile stated that the animal had been identified as a dog.
