= Hebron Academy =

Private school in Hebron, Maine, US

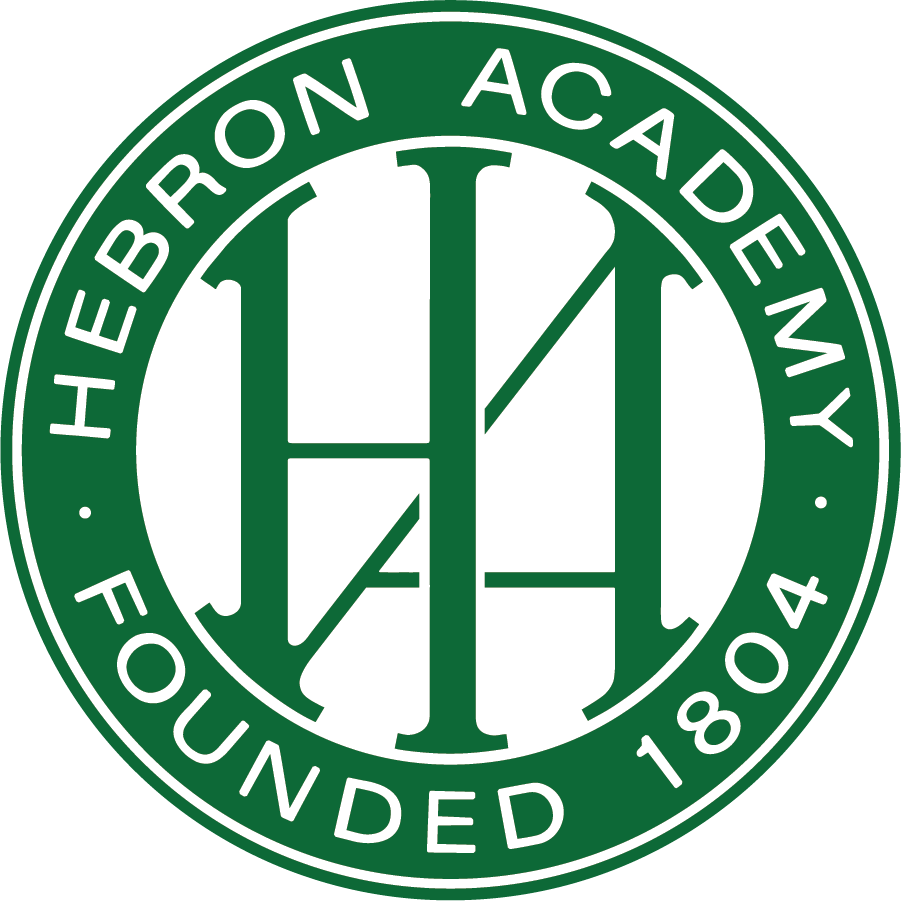

Location
- 339 Paris Road; Hebron, Maine 04238; United States; 44°11′57″N 70°24′34″W

Information
- Type: Private, Boarding
- Motto: Trust. Honor. Respect.
- Established: 1804
- Head of school: Patrick Phillips
- Grades: 6–12
- Enrollment: 246
- Student to teacher ratio: 5:1
- Language: English
- Campus size: 1,500 acres
- Campus type: Rural
- Colors: Green and White
- Mascot: Lumberjack
- Team name: Hebron Lumberjacks
- Website: www.hebronacademy.org

Hebron Academy is a small, independent, college preparatory boarding and day school in Hebron, Maine. Founded in 1804, it serves boys and girls in grades six through postgraduate.

== Tuition ==
Tuition for the 2023–2024 academic year is $64,000 for International boarding students, $56,000 for Domestic boarding students, $45,000 for Maine and New Hampshire resident boarding students, and $26,000 for day students.

== Notable alumni ==
- Leon Leonwood Bean, businessman
- Jose Gumbs, NFL football player
- Hannibal Hamlin, 15th Vice President of the United States
- Damariscotta Helm, international whistling champion
- Charles Hinkle, basketball player
- Ayumi Horie, artist
- Ben Jessome, politician
- William MacVane, politician and surgeon
- Sean Morey, NFL football player
- Althea G. Quimby, president, Woman's Christian Temperance Union of Maine
- George Lincoln Rockwell, Neo-Nazi politician
- Robert A. Rushworth, U.S.A.F. major general and astronaut
- John Brown Russwurm, journalist and governor of the Republic of Maryland
- Tim Sample, comedian
- Freelan Oscar Stanley, inventor
- Stanley R. Tupper, politician
- Donald Valle, restaurateur

== See also ==
- Education in Maine
- Sturtevant Hall
