= Naples (CDP), Maine =

Naples, Maine
- Census-designated place
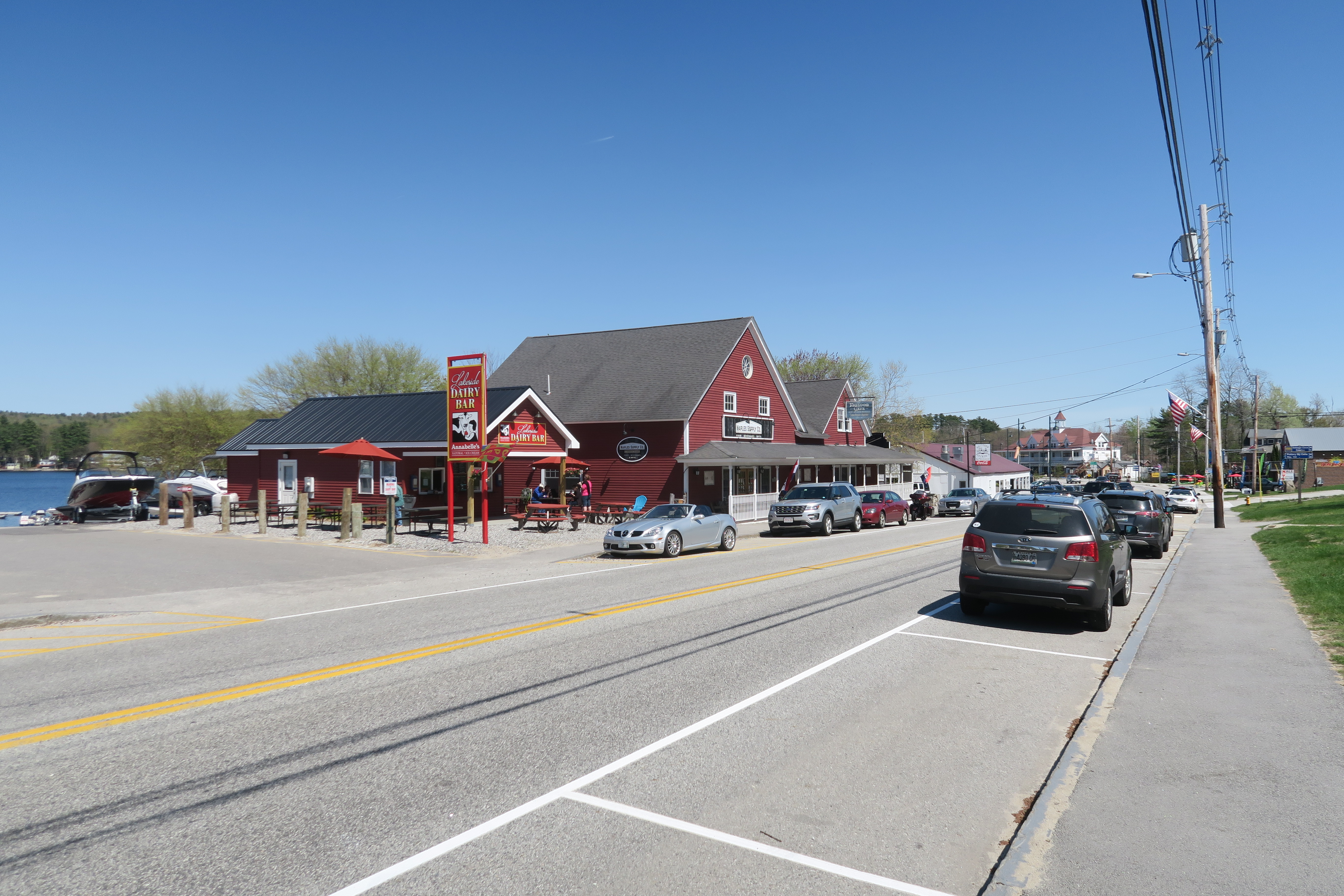
- Lakeside Dairy Bar

- Location in Cumberland County and the state of Maine
- Coordinates: 43°57′41″N 70°36′54″W
- Country: United States
- State: Maine
- County: Cumberland
- Town: Naples

Area
  - Total: 3.35 sq mi (8.67 km^{2})
  - Land: 2.59 sq mi (6.71 km^{2})
  - Water: 0.76 sq mi (1.96 km^{2})
- Elevation: 308 ft (94 m)

Population (2020)
  - Total: 415
  - Density: 160.2/sq mi (61.85/km^{2})
- Time zone: UTC-5 (Eastern (EST))
  - Summer (DST): UTC-4 (EDT)
- ZIP Code: 04055
- Area code: 207
- FIPS code: 23-48050
- GNIS feature ID: 2583563

Naples is a census-designated place (CDP) in the town of Naples in Cumberland County, Maine, United States. The population of the CDP was 428 at the 2010 census.

It is part of the Portland–South Portland–Biddeford, Maine Metropolitan Statistical Area.

== Geography ==
Naples is located at the south end of Long Lake and north end of Brandy Pond. According to the United States Census Bureau, the Naples CDP has a total area of 3.4 square miles (8.7 km^{2}), of which 2.6 square miles (6.7 km^{2}) is land and 0.77 square miles (2.0 km^{2}), or 22.72%, is water, consisting primarily of the north end of Brandy Pond.

U.S. Route 302 passes through Naples, heading northwest to Bridgton and southeast to Windham and Portland. Maine State Route 11 intersects US 302, heading south to the western shore of Sebago Lake and northeast towards Poland and Mechanic Falls. Maine State Route 35 leaves US 302 in Naples and heads north to Harrison.

== Demographics ==
Historical population
Census	Pop.	Note	%±
2020	415		—
U.S. Decennial Census
