= Little Androscoggin River =

- Location within Maine Location within the United States

Location
- Country: United States

Physical characteristics
- Source
  - location: Maine
- Mouth
  - location: Androscoggin River
  - coordinates: 44°05′20″N 70°13′23″W
  - elevation: 115 feet (40 m)}

The Little Androscoggin River is a 51.4-mile-long (82.7 km) river in Maine. It flows from Bryant Pond in Woodstock (44°21′53″N 70°38′18″W) to its confluence with the Androscoggin River in Auburn. The Androscoggin flows into Merrymeeting Bay in the Kennebec River estuary.

The Little Androscoggin flows through the towns of Woodstock, Greenwood, West Paris, Paris (including the village of South Paris), Norway, Oxford, Mechanic Falls, Minot, and Poland, and the city of Auburn.

== Thompson Lake ==
Thompson Lake
- Location within Maine Location within the United States
- Coordinates: 44°05′N 70°30′W
- Max. length: 7.7 mi (12.4 km)
- Surface area: 4,419 acres (1,788 ha)
- Max. depth: 121 feet (37 m)
- Water volume: 173,712 acre⋅ft (214,271,000 m^{3})
- Surface elevation: 325 ft (99 m)

Thompson Lake is the largest lake in the Little Androscoggin watershed. The north end of the lake overflows into the Little Androscoggin River through the village of Oxford. The lake forms the boundary between Otisfield to the west and Oxford and Poland to the northeast and southeast, respectively. The southern tip of the lake is in Casco. Greeley Brook is the largest tributary to the lake, and flows 7 miles (11 km) from Sand Pond in Norway. Smaller tributaries include Knights Brook and Jerry Brook in Otisfield and Potash Brook in Poland. The lake is good habitat for smallmouth and largemouth bass and has been stocked with trout.

== See also ==
- List of rivers of Maine
