= Maine State Route 123 =

State highway in Cumberland County, Maine, US

State Route 123

Route information
- Maintained by MaineDOT
- Length: 13.60 mi (21.89 km)

Major junctions
- South end: Potts Point Road in Harpswell
- North end: SR 24 Bus. in Brunswick

Location
- Country: United States
- State: Maine
- Counties: Cumberland

Highway system
- Maine State Highway System; Interstate; US; State; Auto trails; Lettered highways
| ← SR 122 | → SR 124 |

State Route 123 (SR 123) is part of Maine's system of numbered state highways, running from Harpswell to SR 24 Business in Brunswick. The entire route is in Cumberland County.

== Route description ==
SR 123 begins at the intersection of Potts Point Road and Evergreen Avenue near the southernmost point of Harpswell Neck within the town of Harpswell. The two-lane road heads through a small residential area then across a small causeway onto a larger part of Harpswell Neck where SR 123 heads past several small businesses and houses. Two communities through which the road passes are South Harpswell and West Harpswell. As it continues north, the density of houses lining the road decreases as it heads through Harpswell Center and North Harpswell. After crossing into Brunswick, the road exits the Harpswell Neck peninsula and passes through the small settlement of Dyers Corner. It heads around the west side of Brunswick Executive Airport and through a residential neighborhood of Brunswick. Before the highway ends, SR 123 heads around the east side of Bowdoin College. SR 123 ends at Bath Road which carries SR 24 Business (formerly SR 24). It does not intersect with any other routes for its entire length.

== Major junctions ==
The entire route is in Cumberland County.

| Location | mi | km | Destinations | Notes |
|---|---|---|---|---|
| Harpswell | 0.00 | 0.00 | Potts Point Road / Evergreen Avenue | |
| Brunswick | 13.60 | 21.89 | SR 24 Bus. (Bath Road) / Federal Street | |
1.000 mi = 1.609 km; 1.000 km = 0.621 mi
