= Mechanic Falls, Maine =

Town in Maine, United States

- Town
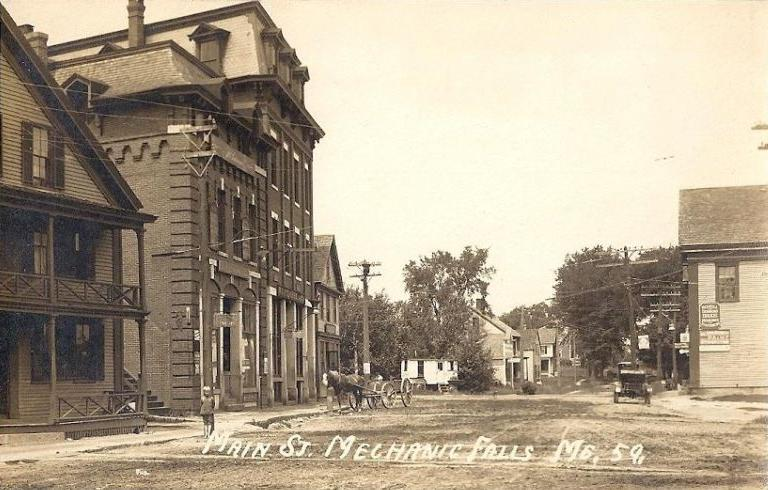
- Main Street, Mechanic Falls in 1913

- Logo

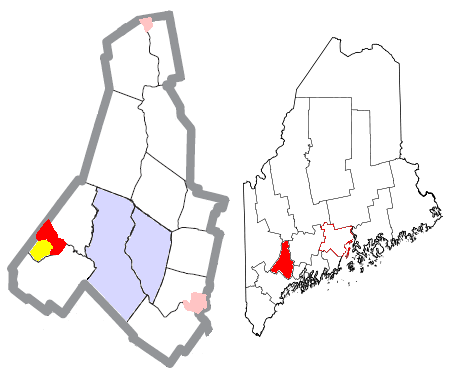
- Location of Mechanic Falls, Maine
- Coordinates: 44°06′45″N 70°23′30″W
- Country: United States
- State: Maine
- County: Androscoggin
- Incorporated: 1893

Government
  - Type: Manager / Council

Area
  - Total: 11.2 sq mi (28.9 km^{2})
  - Land: 11.00 sq mi (28.48 km^{2})
  - Water: 0.16 sq mi (0.41 km^{2})
- Elevation: 315 ft (96 m)

Population (2020)
  - Total: 3,107
  - Density: 283/sq mi (109.1/km^{2})
- Time zone: UTC-5 (Eastern)
  - Summer (DST): UTC-4 (Eastern)
- ZIP codes: 04256
- Area code: 207
- FIPS code: 23-38740
- GNIS feature ID: 582587
- Website: www.mechanicfalls.org

Mechanic Falls is a town in Androscoggin County, Maine, United States. The population was 3,107 at the 2020 census. Mechanic Falls contains the census-designated place of the same name. It is included in the Lewiston-Auburn, Maine Metropolitan Statistical Area and the Lewiston-Auburn, Maine metropolitan New England City and Town Area.

== History ==
The town was originally part of Bakerstown Plantation, granted in 1765 by the Massachusetts General Court to Captain Thomas Baker and other soldiers for their services in the 1690 Battle of Quebec. In 1795, Bakerstown Plantation was incorporated as Poland, from which Minot would be set off in 1802. The dividing line between the towns was the Little Androscoggin River, astride which the village of Mechanic Falls developed. The Poland section of Mechanic Falls was settled in 1830, and the Minot in 1836 by Dean Andrews, who was drawn by its fine soil for farming and waterpower for mills at the falls. Mechanic Falls developed into a small mill town named for the mechanics operating early industrial works here, especially after the St. Lawrence and Atlantic Railroad arrived in the late 1840s. The railroad opened the village to business and trade on the direct line between Portland and Montreal.

In 1850, the first paper mill was established. Organized in 1873, the Evans Rifle Manufacturing Company made repeating rifles, popular with frontiersmen such as Kit Carson and Buffalo Bill Cody. Other industries produced canned goods, bricks, novelties, confectionery, packed corn, carriages, tools, machines, steam engines and boilers. In 1872, John Witham Penney began manufacturing steam engines, machinery and foundry articles in Mechanic Falls. Fourteen years later, in 1886, his two sons, A.R.and S.R. Penney, became partners, formally establishing J.W. Penney and Sons, which grew to become one of the greatest machine shops in Maine and was a great factor in the prosperity of Mechanic Falls. On March 22, 1893, Mechanic Falls was set off and incorporated. In 1981, Marcal Paper closed the latter of two paper mills in the town, which now has a more diversified economy and tax base.

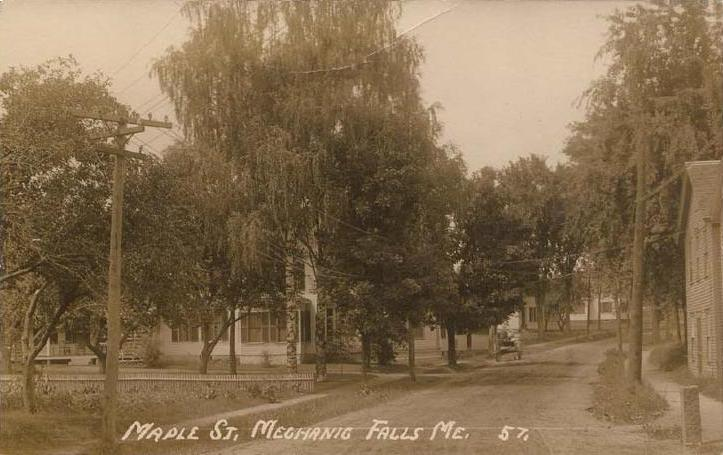
Maple Street in 1913

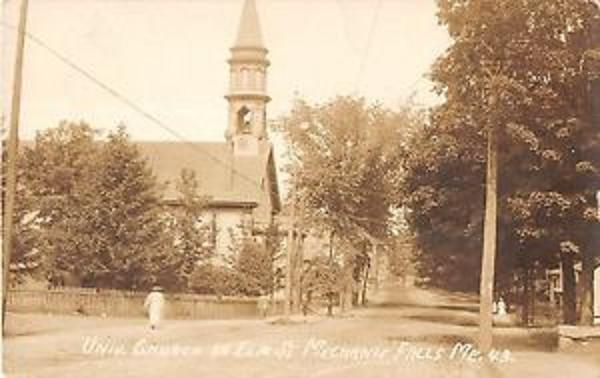
Elm Street Church in 1913

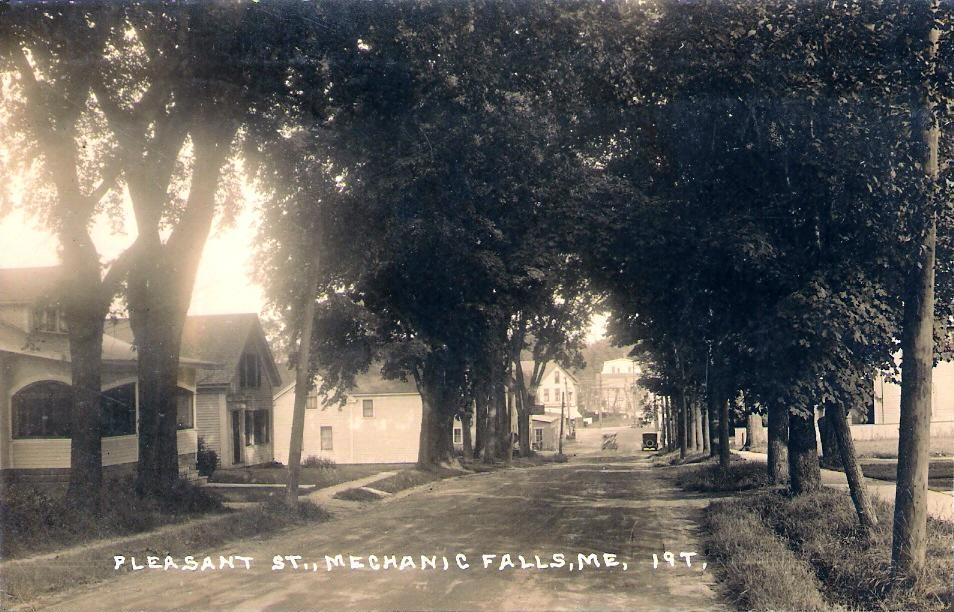
Pleasant Street c. 1922

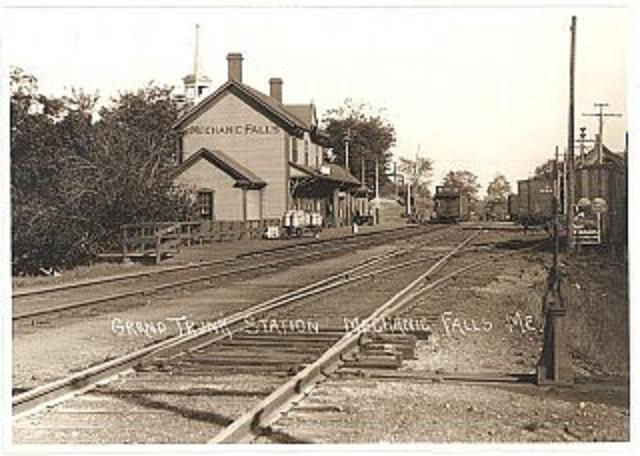
Grand Trunk Station in 1913

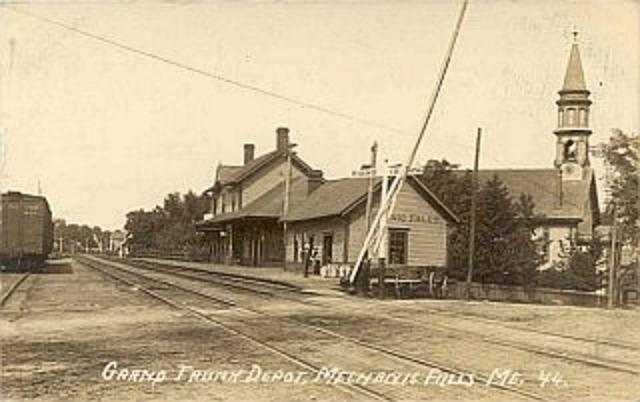
Grand Trunk Depot in 1913

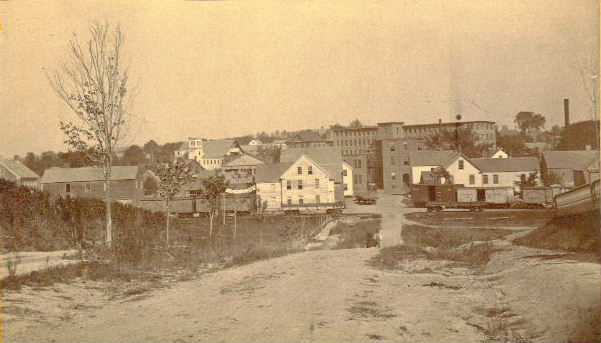
View of Scott Paper Mill in 1913

== Geography ==
According to the United States Census Bureau, the town has a total area of 11.16 square miles (28.90 km^{2}), of which 11.00 square miles (28.49 km^{2}) is land and 0.16 square miles (0.41 km^{2}) is water. The Little Androscoggin River drains Mechanic Falls.

State routes 11, 26, 121, and 124 cross the town, bordered by Poland's town to the south, Oxford to the northwest, and Minot to the northeast.

== Demographics ==
Historical population
Census	Pop.	Note	%±
1900	1,687		—
1910	1,678		−0.5%
1920	1,614		−3.8%
1930	2,033		26.0%
1940	1,999		−1.7%
1950	2,061		3.1%
1960	2,195		6.5%
1970	2,193		−0.1%
1980	2,616		19.3%
1990	2,919		11.6%
2000	3,138		7.5%
2010	3,031		−3.4%
2020	3,107		2.5%
U.S. Decennial Census

=== 2010 census ===
As of the 2010 census, 3,031 people, 1,206 households, and 811 families lived in the town. The population density was 275.5 inhabitants per square mile (106.4/km^{2}). There were 1,299 housing units at an average density of 118.1 per square mile (45.6/km^{2}). The racial makeup of the town was 96.7% White, 0.3% African American, 0.5% Native American, 0.3% Asian, 0.3% from other races, and 1.9% from two or more races. Hispanic or Latino of any race were 0.8% of the population.

There were 1,206 households, of which 34.7% had children under the age of 18 living with them, 48.8% were married couples living together, 12.9% had a female householder with no husband present, 5.6% had a male householder with no wife present, and 32.8% were non-families. 24.7% of all households comprised individuals, and 10.3% had someone aged 65 or older living alone. The average household size was 2.50, and the average family size was 2.96.

The median age in the town was 39.8 years. 24.2% of residents were under 18; 7.5% were between the ages of 18 and 24; 25.8% were from 25 to 44; 29.7% were from 45 to 64; and 12.8% were aged 65 or older. The gender makeup of the town was 49.0% male and 51.0% female.

=== 2000 census ===
As of the 2000 census, 3,138 people, 1,163 households, and 840 families lived in the town. The population density was 282.2 inhabitants per square mile (109.0/km^{2}). There were 1,242 housing units at an average density of 111.7 per square mile (43.1/km^{2}). The town's racial makeup was 97.26% White, 0.51% Black or African American, 0.64% Native American, 0.61% Asian, 0.03% Pacific Islander, 0.06% other races, and 0.89% from two or more races. Hispanic or Latino of any race were 0.51% of the population.

There were 1,163 households, of which 35.6% had children under 18 living with them, 55.0% were married couples living together, 12.2% had a female householder with no husband present, and 27.7% were non-families. 21.4% of all households comprised individuals, and 9.4% had someone aged 65 or older living alone. The average household size was 2.67, and the average family size was 3.06.

The town's population was spread out, with 27.1% under 18, 7.6% from 18 to 24, 31.1% from 25 to 44, 22.9% from 45 to 64, and 11.3% aged 65 or older. The median age was 36 years. For every 100 females, there were 95.3 males. For every 100 females age 18 and over, there were 92.8 males.

The median income for a household in the town was $34,864, and the median income for a family was $41,188. Males had a median income of $30,479 versus $22,391 for females. The per capita income for the town was $15,383. About 10.4% of families and 13.8% of the population were below the poverty line, including 18.0% of those under age 18 and 18.7% of those age 65 or over.

== Sites of interest ==
- Mechanic Falls Historical Society
- The Samuel Penney House c. 1902

== Education ==
Mechanic Falls is part of Regional School Unit #16. Kenneth Healey is the Superintendent of Schools.

Schools in this district include Elm Street School, Minot Consolidated School, Poland Community School, Bruce Whittier Middle School and Poland Regional High School.

== Notable people ==
- Mike Bordick, shortstop with Major League Baseball
- Bill Dunlop, record-setting sailor, crossed Atlantic in 9 foot Winds Will
- David Dunn, 18th governor of Maine
- Frank Haven Hall, inventor of the Hall Braille Writer and other Braille printing devices
- Marshall Kirk, librarian, writer
- Lewis L. Millett, Medal of Honor recipient, Korean War officer
- Freelan Oscar Stanley, inventor of the Stanley Steamer, Mechanic Falls schoolmaster
- Flora E. Strout (1867–1962), teacher and social reformer

== See also ==
- Grand Trunk Station (Mechanic Falls)
