= Androscoggin County, Maine =

County in Maine, United States

- County
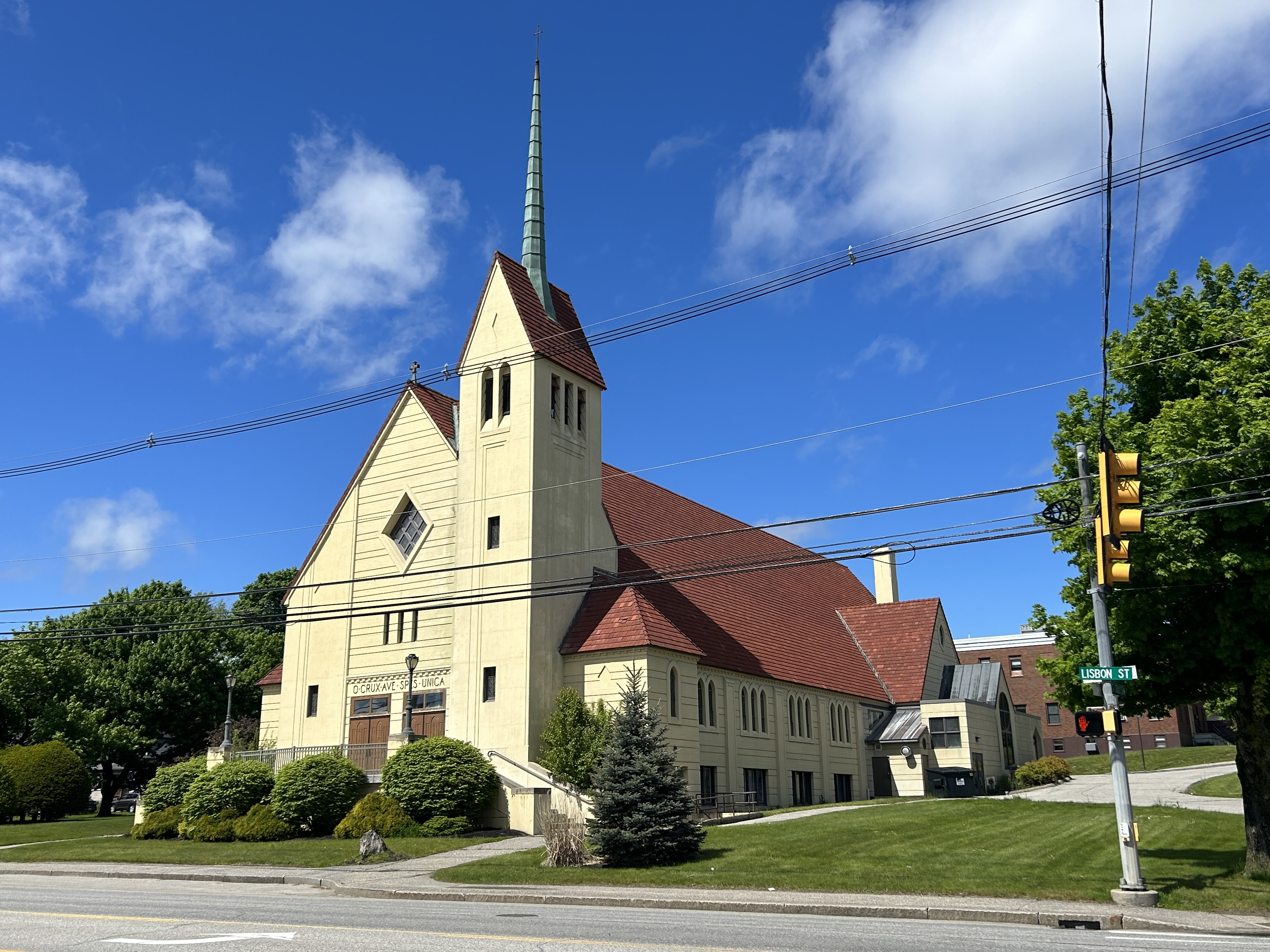
- Holy Cross Church, Lewiston

- Seal Logo

- Location within the U.S. state of Maine
- Coordinates: 44.17°N 70.21°W
- Country: United States
- State: Maine
- Founded: March 18, 1854
- Named for: the Androscoggin tribe
- Seat: Auburn
- Largest city: Lewiston

Area
  - Total: 497 sq mi (1,290 km^{2})
  - Land: 468 sq mi (1,210 km^{2})
  - Water: 29 sq mi (75 km^{2}) 5.9%

Population (2020)
  - Total: 111,139
  - Estimate (2025): 116,487 ▲
  - Density: 237/sq mi (91.7/km^{2})
- Time zone: UTC−5 (Eastern)
  - Summer (DST): UTC−4 (EDT)
- Congressional district: 2nd
- Website: androscoggincountymaine.gov

Androscoggin County is a county in the U.S. state of Maine. As of the 2020 census, the county's population was 111,139. Its county seat is Auburn and its most populous city is Lewiston.

Androscoggin County comprises the Lewiston-Auburn, Maine metropolitan statistical area and is partially included in the Lewiston-Auburn, Maine, Metropolitan New England City and Town Area. It is also a part of the Portland-Lewiston-South Portland, Maine combined statistical area.

Bates College is in the Androscoggin County city of Lewiston.

== History ==
Demand for a new county emerged when the residents of the rapidly growing town of Lewiston complained of the long distance they had to travel to reach Wiscasset, the county seat of Lincoln County, in which Lewiston was originally located. It was also an impractical circumstance as Lewiston's neighbor, Auburn, was part of Cumberland County. As the growing partnership of the two towns emerged, the case for the towns to be in the same county grew. Different plans were discussed, including Lewiston joining Cumberland County. Eventually, the idea of a new county came to the table. The debate then became over which town would be the center of the new county. Bath, Brunswick, and Lewiston each desired the distinction. Lewiston eventually won the debate. Androscoggin County was created in 1854 from towns originally in Cumberland County, Lincoln County, Kennebec County, and Oxford County.

The next issue centered on where to put the county seat, as both Lewiston and Auburn desired to be named the county seat. It would eventually be put to a vote, with both towns putting different offers on the table, including ideas to cut the costs of the new county buildings for surrounding towns. Auburn would eventually win a convincing victory, with the towns on each side of the river voting for the town on their side. As more people then lived to the west of the Androscoggin River, Auburn won the vote.

== Geography ==
According to the U.S. Census Bureau, the county has a total area of 497 square miles (1,290 km^{2}), of which 468 square miles (1,210 km^{2}) is land and 29 square miles (75 km^{2}) (5.9%) is water. It is the second-smallest county in Maine by total area, after neighboring Sagadahoc County, while Knox County is second-smallest by land area.

The Androscoggin River flows through the center of the county, as well as forming a short part of the county line with Sagadahoc County in the south. The Androscoggin Riverlands State Park lies along the river, north of Auburn. The county is also the site of Poland Spring, the original source of the bottled water brand bearing its name. Hill Ridge lies to the west of Sabattus Pond and east of the Androscoggin River.

=== Adjacent counties ===
- Franklin County – north
- Kennebec County – northeast
- Sagadahoc County – southeast
- Cumberland County – south
- Oxford County – west

=== Major highways ===
- I-95
- US 202
- SR 4
- SR 9
- SR 11
- SR 26
- SR 106
- SR 108
- SR 117
- SR 121
- SR 122
- SR 125
- SR 126
- SR 132
- SR 133
- SR 197
- SR 219

== Demographics ==
Historical population
Census	Pop.	Note	%±
1860	29,726		—
1870	35,866		20.7%
1880	45,042		25.6%
1890	48,968		8.7%
1900	54,242		10.8%
1910	59,822		10.3%
1920	65,796		10.0%
1930	71,214		8.2%
1940	76,679		7.7%
1950	83,594		9.0%
1960	86,312		3.3%
1970	91,279		5.8%
1980	99,657		9.2%
1990	105,259		5.6%
2000	103,793		−1.4%
2010	107,702		3.8%
2020	111,139		3.2%
2025 (est.)	116,487	▲	4.8%
U.S. Decennial Census; 1790–1960 1900–1990; 1990–2000 2010–2016 2017

Androscoggin County, Maine – Racial and ethnic composition Note: the US Census treats Hispanic/Latino as an ethnic category. This table excludes Latinos from the racial categories and assigns them to a separate category. Hispanics/Latinos may be of any race.
Race / Ethnicity (NH = Non-Hispanic)	2020	2010	2000	1990	1980
White alone (NH)	86.3% (95,875)	91.9% (98,931)	96.4% (100,059)	98% (103,192)	99% (98,619)
Black alone (NH)	5.8% (6,436)	3.6% (3,858)	0.6% (647)	0.4% (463)	0.3% (326)
American Indian alone (NH)	0.3% (382)	0.4% (383)	0.3% (281)	0.2% (229)	0.1% (104)
Asian alone (NH)	0.8% (895)	0.7% (773)	0.5% (567)	0.5% (539)	0.2% (172)
Pacific Islander alone (NH)	0% (50)	0% (29)	0% (37)		
Other race alone (NH)	0.3% (376)	0.1% (101)	0% (48)	0.1% (56)	0% (40)
Multiracial (NH)	4.4% (4,903)	1.8% (1,958)	1.1% (1,166)	—	—
Hispanic/Latino (any race)	2% (2,222)	1.5% (1,669)	1% (988)	0.7% (780)	0.4% (396)

=== 2020 census ===
As of the 2020 census, the county had a population of 111,139 and 45,393 households. Of the residents, 20.9% were under the age of 18 and 18.6% were 65 years of age or older; the median age was 41.2 years. For every 100 females there were 95.7 males, and for every 100 females age 18 and over there were 93.7 males. 54.7% of residents lived in urban areas and 45.3% lived in rural areas.

The population density was 237.5 inhabitants per square mile (91.7/km^{2}). There were 50,844 housing units at a density of 102.3 per square mile (39.5/km^{2}).

The racial makeup of the county was 86.9% White, 5.9% Black or African American, 0.4% American Indian and Alaska Native, 0.8% Asian, 0.1% Native Hawaiian and Pacific Islander, 0.7% from some other race, and 5.2% from two or more races. Hispanic or Latino residents of any race comprised 2.0% of the population. The largest ancestry groups were: 19.7% English, 18.6% French, 14.6% Irish, 5.7% German, 4.7% Italian, 3.7% Scottish, and 2.1% Subsaharan African. 10.6% of the population over age 5 spoke a language other than English at home.

There were 45,393 households in the county, of which 27.3% had children under the age of 18 living with them and 26.9% had a female householder with no spouse or partner present. About 29.9% of all households were made up of individuals and 12.3% had someone living alone who was 65 years of age or older.

There were 49,837 housing units, of which 8.9% were vacant. Among occupied housing units, 64.1% were owner-occupied and 35.9% were renter-occupied. The homeowner vacancy rate was 1.0% and the rental vacancy rate was 6.8%.

The median household income was $64,500, and $73,029 for families. The per capita income was $34,273. At 12.7%, Androscoggin County has a poverty rate nearly 2% higher than the state as a whole. The poverty rate for those under 18 was 19.4% and 8.5% for individuals aged 65 and over.

=== 2010 census ===
At the 2010 census, there were 107,702 people, 44,315 households, and 28,045 families living in the county. The population density was 230.2 inhabitants per square mile (88.9/km^{2}). There were 49,090 housing units at an average density of 104.9 per square mile (40.5/km^{2}). The racial makeup of the county was 92.8% white, 3.6% black or African American, 0.7% Asian, 0.4% American Indian, 0.4% from other races, and 2.0% from two or more races. Those of Hispanic or Latino origin made up 1.5% of the population. The largest ancestry groups were as follows: 21.2% cited English ancestry, 20.5% French Canadian, 20.1% French (not counted in the previous group), 15.5% Irish, 8.1% German, and 5.0% American.

Of the 44,315 households, 30.2% had children under the age of 18 living with them, 45.8% were married couples living together, 12.0% had a female householder with no husband present, 36.7% were non-families, and 28.3% of households were made up of individuals. The average household size was 2.37 and the average family size was 2.88. The median age was 39.8 years.

The median household income was $44,470 and the median family income was $55,045. Males had a median income of $41,554 versus $31,852 for females. The per capita income for the county was $22,752. About 9.7% of families and 14.3% of the population were below the poverty line, including 20.0% of those under age 18 and 12.4% of those age 65 or over.

== Media ==
=== Newspapers ===
- The Sun Journal prints a daily newspaper in four different editions statewide. The Sun Journal was the recipient of the 2008 New England Daily Newspaper of the Year and the 2009 Maine Press Association Newspaper of the Year.

== Politics ==
=== Presidential elections ===
United States presidential election results for Androscoggin County, Maine
Year	Republican		Democratic		Third party(ies)	
Year	No.	%	No.	%	No.	%
1856	3,388	64.25%	1,699	32.22%	186	3.53%
1860	3,526	64.35%	1,838	33.55%	115	2.10%
1864	3,363	63.46%	1,936	36.54%	0	0.00%
1868	4,427	68.24%	2,060	31.76%	0	0.00%
1872	4,187	72.48%	1,590	27.52%	0	0.00%
1876	4,294	58.26%	3,077	41.74%	0	0.00%
1880	4,974	52.76%	4,215	44.71%	239	2.54%
1884	4,745	52.13%	3,469	38.11%	889	9.77%
1888	4,893	54.99%	3,585	40.29%	420	4.72%
1892	4,326	52.47%	3,452	41.87%	466	5.65%
1896	5,548	66.61%	2,513	30.17%	268	3.22%
1900	4,648	57.44%	3,182	39.32%	262	3.24%
1904	4,393	62.31%	2,206	31.29%	451	6.40%
1908	4,381	56.06%	3,095	39.60%	339	4.34%
1912	859	8.44%	4,516	44.38%	4,801	47.18%
1916	4,496	43.71%	5,464	53.12%	326	3.17%
1920	9,565	60.83%	5,757	36.61%	402	2.56%
1924	9,680	59.80%	4,733	29.24%	1,774	10.96%
1928	11,790	51.59%	10,940	47.87%	124	0.54%
1932	9,838	40.05%	14,441	58.79%	283	1.15%
1936	10,480	38.14%	16,657	60.62%	340	1.24%
1940	10,394	34.99%	19,273	64.88%	40	0.13%
1944	10,927	36.38%	19,078	63.51%	34	0.11%
1948	11,443	39.24%	17,405	59.68%	317	1.09%
1952	18,049	50.59%	17,560	49.22%	67	0.19%
1956	20,385	56.27%	15,842	43.73%	0	0.00%
1960	14,654	35.96%	26,097	64.04%	0	0.00%
1964	7,441	19.82%	30,080	80.14%	14	0.04%
1968	10,390	27.52%	26,820	71.04%	542	1.44%
1972	19,406	49.86%	19,509	50.12%	9	0.02%
1976	16,330	37.40%	26,484	60.65%	851	1.95%
1980	18,399	39.93%	22,715	49.29%	4,966	10.78%
1984	26,904	57.24%	19,885	42.31%	211	0.45%
1988	23,061	51.72%	21,165	47.47%	359	0.81%
1992	14,174	25.70%	22,247	40.34%	18,723	33.95%
1996	12,053	25.79%	26,428	56.55%	8,250	17.65%
2000	19,948	40.51%	26,251	53.31%	3,046	6.19%
2004	24,519	43.73%	30,503	54.40%	1,045	1.86%
2008	22,671	41.33%	31,017	56.55%	1,162	2.12%
2012	22,232	42.06%	28,989	54.84%	1,641	3.10%
2016	28,227	50.77%	23,009	41.38%	4,365	7.85%
2020	29,268	49.85%	27,617	47.04%	1,822	3.10%
2024	30,605	52.01%	27,019	45.91%	1,223	2.08%

In presidential elections, Androscoggin County is considered a "swing area" by most political standards, with a fairly even split between Democratic and Republican voters. It was the only county in Maine to be won by Democrats Franklin D. Roosevelt in 1932 and George McGovern in 1972. Jimmy Carter also carried the county twice. In 1984 and 1988, it went for Republican candidates Ronald Reagan and George H.W. Bush, who also won the state of Maine. However, the county swayed in favor of Republican Donald Trump for both the 2016 and 2020 elections, even as the state as a whole was won by Democrats Hillary Clinton and Joe Biden, respectively. In 2024, Trump carried the county again, this time by an even larger margin, the strongest showing for a Republican since 1984, though Democratic nominee Kamala Harris carried the state. In 2024, Trump became the first Republican presidential candidate to receive 30,000 votes in the county, and just the fourth ever after Democrats Lyndon B. Johnson in 1964, John Kerry in 2004, and Barack Obama in 2008.

=== State politics ===
In 2012, the county voted 54% against Maine Question 1, 2012 – a measure to legalize same-sex marriage, but the referendum passed in the state with 53%.

=== County government ===
Androscoggin County is governed by an elected county commission consisting of seven members representing single-member districts. Currently, the county commissioners are:

- District 1 Edouard Plourde (D)
- District 2 Roland Poirier (D)
- District 3 Brian Ames (R)
- District 4 Garrett Mason (R)
- District 5 Andrew Lewis (D)
- District 6 Terri Kelly (R)
- District 7 Sally A. Christner (R)

=== Voter registration ===
Active voter registration and party enrollment as of March 2024
Democratic	22,352	32.54%
Republican	20,684	30.11%
Unenrolled	19,664	28.62%
Green Independent	3,199	4.66%
Libertarian	1,403	2.04%
No Labels	1,397	2.03%
Total	68,699	100%

== Communities ==
=== Incorporated towns and cities ===
- Auburn
- Durham
- Greene
- Leeds
- Lewiston
- Lisbon
- Livermore
- Livermore Falls
- Mechanic Falls
- Minot
- Poland
- Sabattus
- Turner
- Wales

=== Census-designated places ===
- Greene
- Lisbon
- Lisbon Falls
- Livermore Falls
- Mechanic Falls
- Sabattus
- Turner

== Economy ==
Some agriculture exists here. Androscoggin is especially known for poultry – ranking #1 in the state for the poultry and egg category from 77 producing farms. The county is also top in the state for hog and pig production.

== See also ==
- Androscoggin Creature
- Lewiston shootings, which took place in the county in 2023
- Lisbon School Department
- National Register of Historic Places listings in Androscoggin County, Maine
