= Minot, Maine =

Town in Maine, United States

- Town
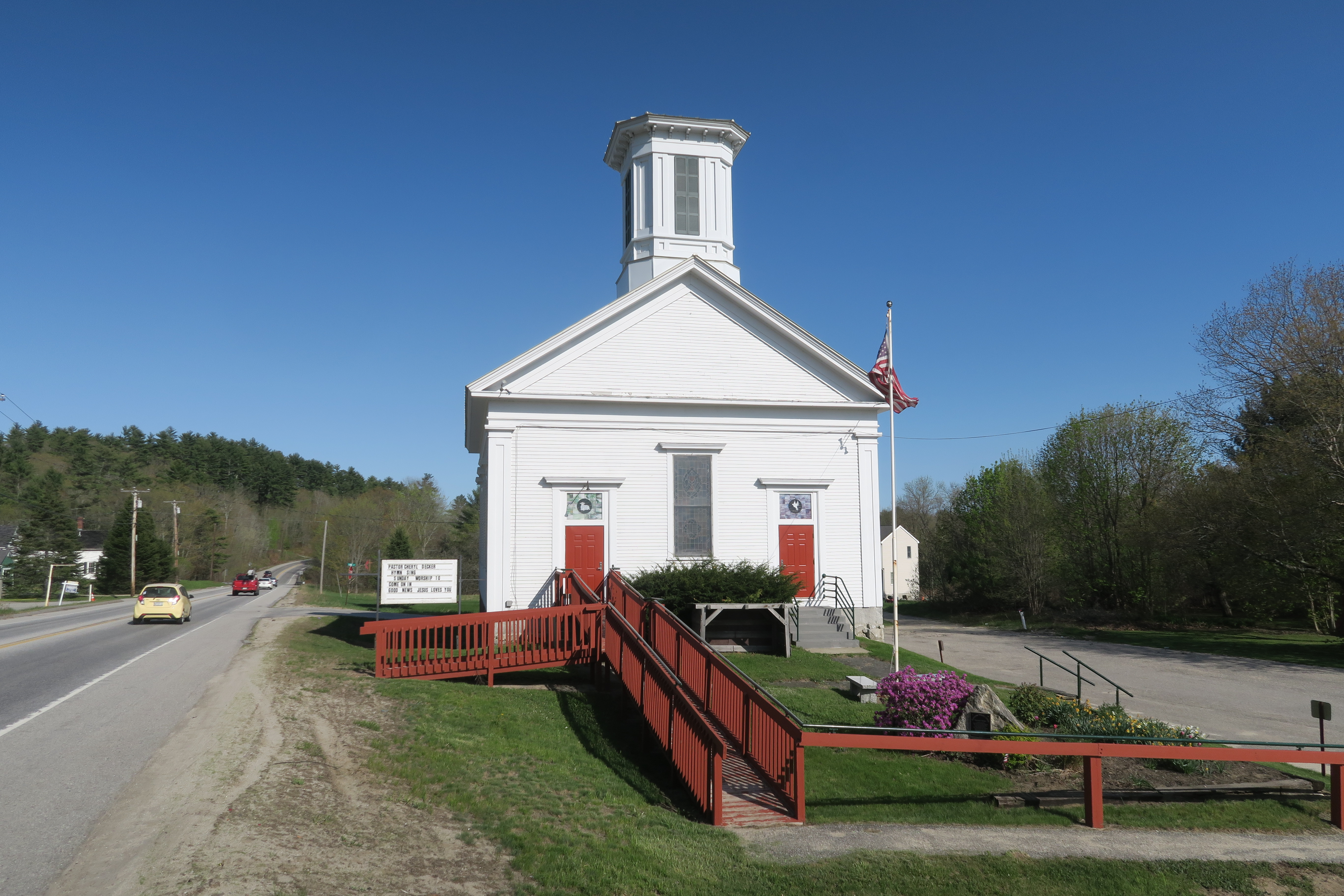
- United Methodist Church of Minot

- Logo

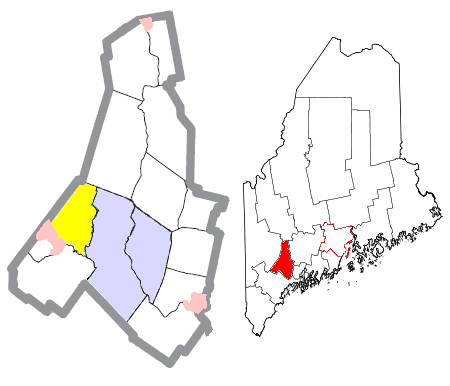
- Location of Minot (in yellow) in Androscoggin County and the state of Maine
- Coordinates: 44°07′10″N 70°22′45″W
- Country: United States
- State: Maine
- County: Androscoggin
- Incorporated: 1802
- Villages: Minot; Center Minot; West Minot

Area
  - Total: 29.75 sq mi (77.05 km^{2})
  - Land: 29.57 sq mi (76.59 km^{2})
  - Water: 0.18 sq mi (0.47 km^{2})
- Elevation: 532 ft (162 m)

Population (2020)
  - Total: 2,766
  - Density: 93/sq mi (36.1/km^{2})
- Time zone: UTC-5 (Eastern (EST))
  - Summer (DST): UTC-4 (EDT)
- ZIP Codes: 04258 (Minot); 04288 (West Minot)
- Area code: 207
- FIPS code: 23-46160
- GNIS feature ID: 582599
- Website: www.minotme.org

Minot is a town in Androscoggin County, Maine, United States. The population was 2,766 at the 2020 census. The town includes the villages of West Minot and Minot Center. It is part of both the Lewiston-Auburn, Maine, Metropolitan Statistical Area and the Lewiston-Auburn, Maine, Metropolitan New England City and Town Area.

== History ==
Present-day Minot was part of Bakerstown Plantation, granted in 1765 by the Massachusetts General Court to Captain Thomas Baker and his company of soldiers for their services to the state at the 1690 Battle of Quebec. It replaced a 1736 grant at what is now Salisbury, New Hampshire, ruled invalid in 1741 because of a prior claim from the descendants of John Mason. In 1795, Bakerstown Plantation was incorporated as Poland, named after Chief Poland, a noted local Indian sachem. On February 18, 1802, the northeastern part of Poland was set off as Minot, named after George Richards Minot (1758–1802), historian and judge of the General Court who had aided in the town's incorporation.

The first settler was Moses Emery from Newbury, Massachusetts, in 1772. At that time there were several Indians of the Anasagunticook tribe living in the immediate area. The surface of the town is uneven, in some parts hilly, but with good soil for agriculture, the principal early occupation. Mills were erected at various water power sites, and products included lumber, clapboards, shingles, boxes, shooks and barrel staves. There was also manufacturing in leather, particularly boots, shoes, saddles and harnesses. In 1842, land was set off to form Auburn, to which more land was ceded in 1873. Mechanic Falls, the industrial village astride the border with Poland, was set off in 1893. The population in 1859 was 1,734. Today, Minot is gradually transitioning into a bedroom community of the cities of Auburn and Lewiston.

== Geography ==
According to the United States Census Bureau, the town has a total area of 29.75 square miles (77.05 km^{2}), of which 29.57 square miles (76.59 km^{2}) is land and 0.18 square miles (0.47 km^{2}) is water. Minot is drained by the Little Androscoggin River.

The town is crossed by state routes 11, 119 and 124. It is bordered by the towns of Oxford and Hebron to the northwest, Turner to the north, Auburn to the east, and Poland to the south, and Mechanic Falls to the southwest.

== Demographics ==
Historical population
Census	Pop.	Note	%±
1810	2,020		—
1820	2,524		25.0%
1830	2,904		15.1%
1840	3,550		22.2%
1850	1,734		−51.2%
1860	1,799		3.7%
1870	1,569		−12.8%
1880	1,763		12.4%
1890	1,355		−23.1%
1900	808		−40.4%
1910	786		−2.7%
1920	726		−7.6%
1930	635		−12.5%
1940	674		6.1%
1950	750		11.3%
1960	780		4.0%
1970	919		17.8%
1980	1,631		77.5%
1990	1,664		2.0%
2000	2,248		35.1%
2010	2,607		16.0%
2020	2,766		6.1%
U.S. Decennial Census

=== 2010 census ===
As of the census of 2010, there were 2,607 people, 1,001 households, and 757 families living in the town. The population density was 88.2 inhabitants per square mile (34.1/km^{2}). There were 1,056 housing units at an average density of 35.7 per square mile (13.8/km^{2}). The racial makeup of the town was 97.8% White, 0.3% African American, 0.2% Native American, 0.3% Asian, 0.2% from other races, and 1.3% from two or more races. Hispanic or Latino of any race were 0.8% of the population.

There were 1,001 households, of which 34.7% had children under the age of 18 living with them, 65.9% were married couples living together, 6.5% had a female householder with no husband present, 3.2% had a male householder with no wife present, and 24.4% were non-families. 16.2% of all households were made up of individuals, and 6.4% had someone living alone who was 65 years of age or older. The average household size was 2.59 and the average family size was 2.90.

The median age in the town was 42.3 years. 23.2% of residents were under the age of 18; 5.9% were between the ages of 18 and 24; 26.4% were from 25 to 44; 32.9% were from 45 to 64; and 11.6% were 65 years of age or older. The gender makeup of the town was 50.2% male and 49.8% female.

=== 2000 census ===
As of the census of 2000, there were 2,248 people, 794 households, and 646 families living in the town. The population density was 75.5 inhabitants per square mile (29.2/km^{2}). There were 824 housing units at an average density of 27.7 per square mile (10.7/km^{2}). The racial makeup of the town was 98.27% White, 0.22% African American, 0.13% Native American, 0.31% Asian, 0.04% Pacific Islander, 0.18% from other races, and 0.85% from two or more races. Hispanic or Latino of any race were 0.36% of the population.

There were 794 households, out of which 41.6% had children under the age of 18 living with them, 69.6% were married couples living together, 7.2% had a female householder with no husband present, and 18.6% were non-families. 12.2% of all households were made up of individuals, and 5.3% had someone living alone who was 65 years of age or older. The average household size was 2.82 and the average family size was 3.03.

In the town, the population was spread out, with 27.9% under the age of 18, 6.0% from 18 to 24, 34.1% from 25 to 44, 23.4% from 45 to 64, and 8.5% who were 65 years of age or older. The median age was 37 years. For every 100 females, there were 99.6 males. For every 100 females age 18 and over, there were 99.3 males.

The median income for a household in the town was $47,557, and the median income for a family was $49,926. Males had a median income of $34,459 versus $25,417 for females. The per capita income for the town was $18,668. About 3.7% of families and 6.1% of the population were below the poverty line, including 5.2% of those under age 18 and 13.5% of those age 65 or over.

Voter Registration and Party Enrollment as of January 2015
Party	Total Voters	Percentage
Unenrolled	825	40.3%
Republican	615	30.0%
Democratic	501	24.5%
Green Independent	107	5.2%
Total	2,048	100%

== Site of interest ==
- Minot Historical Society & Museum

== Education ==
Minot is part of Regional School Unit #16. Amy Hediger is the Superintendent of Schools.

Schools in this district include Elm Street School, Minot Consolidated School, Poland Community School, Whittier Middle School and Poland Regional High School.

== Notable people ==
- William P. Bartlett, Wisconsin State Assemblyman
- Emma Bedelia Dunham (1826–1910), poet
- Ellen Hamlin, wife of Vice President of the United States Hannibal Hamlin
- Samuel G. Hilborn, US congressman from California
- William Ladd, first president of the American Peace Society
- Crosby Stuart Noyes, owner and publisher of the Washington Evening Star
- Francis Slattery, naval commander
- Annie Mesannie Wilkins, 63-year old farmer who traveled from Maine to California on horseback in 1954, Last of the Saddle Tramps
