= Oxford, Maine =

Town in Maine, United States

- Town
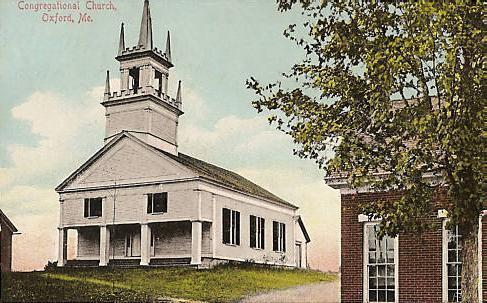
- Congregational Church, c. 1909

- Seal

- Location within Maine Location within the United States
- Coordinates: 44°08′17″N 70°29′42″W
- Country: United States
- State: Maine
- County: Oxford
- Incorporated: 1829

Area
  - Total: 41.88 sq mi (108.47 km^{2})
  - Land: 38.72 sq mi (100.28 km^{2})
  - Water: 3.16 sq mi (8.18 km^{2})
- Elevation: 384 ft (117 m)

Population (2020)
  - Total: 4,229
  - Density: 109.2/sq mi (42.17/km^{2})
- Time zone: UTC-5 (Eastern (EST))
  - Summer (DST): UTC-4 (EDT)
- ZIP code: 04270
- GNIS feature ID: 582658
- Website: www.oxfordmaine.org

Oxford is a town in Oxford County, Maine, United States. Oxford is included in the Lewiston-Auburn, Maine metropolitan New England City and Town Area. The population was 4,229 at the 2020 census. It contains the census-designated place of the same name. Oxford is home to the Oxford Plains Speedway, Kamp Kohut, the annual Oxford County Fair, and Oxford Casino. The town includes the village of Welchville.

== History ==
The land was part of Plantation (also called Bog Brook Plantation), granted on March 8, 1777, by the Massachusetts General Court to Alexander Shepard Jr. of Newton, Massachusetts. On March 6, 1792, the plantation was incorporated as Hebron, with Oxford its southwesterly portion. First settled in 1794, Oxford was set off and incorporated on February 27, 1829. It annexed land from Otisfield in 1830, and from Paris in 1838. The town was named after Oxford, in England.

Farmers grew mostly hay, and the town became noted for cattle. Mills were established at 2 water power sites; these developed in the 19th-century into principal villages within the town, especially after the arrival of the Grand Trunk Railway in the 1850s. Welchville was located on the Little Androscoggin River, where the woolen textile mill of the Harper Manufacturing Company was established. At the outlet of Thompson Lake was Oxford village, first called Craigie's Mill for the sawmill and gristmill built by Andrew Craigie, a Boston apothecary and land speculator. Here were erected a barrel stave mill, a shovel handle factory, and the woolen textile mills of the Robinson Manufacturing Company. The railroad brought seasonal tourists to Thompson Lake, where inns and hotels opened. Today, Oxford is a recreational area with fine architecture remaining from its prosperous mill town past. The Congregational Church, built in 1842–1843, is listed on the National Register of Historic Places.

The town was hit by an F1 tornado on Saturday, June 5, 2010, causing some serious damage.

== Geography ==
According to the United States Census Bureau, the town has a total area of 41.88 square miles (108.47 km^{2}), of which 38.72 square miles (100.28 km^{2}) is land and 3.16 square miles (8.18 km^{2}) is water. Oxford is drained by the Little Androscoggin River. Thompson Lake, the community's largest, is approximately 8 miles (13 km) long.

The town is served by state routes 26 and 121. It borders the towns of Paris to the north, Hebron to the northeast, Norway to the northwest, Poland to the southeast, and Otisfield to the southwest.

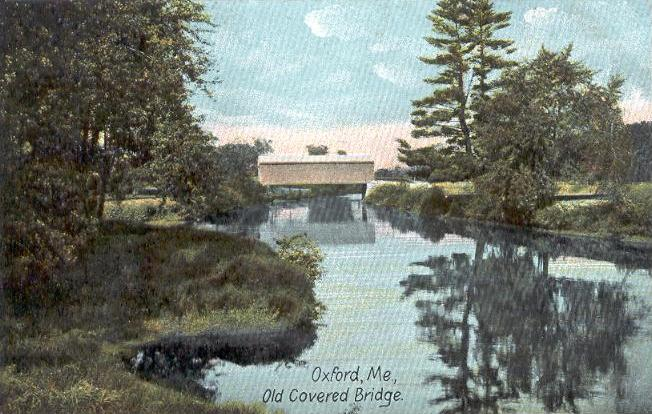
Covered bridge c. 1907

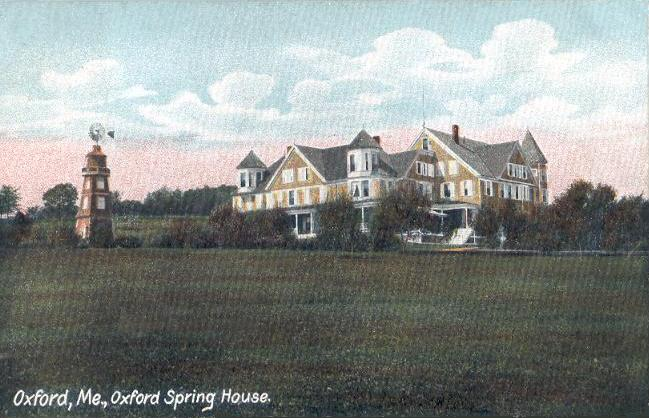
Oxford Spring House in 1907

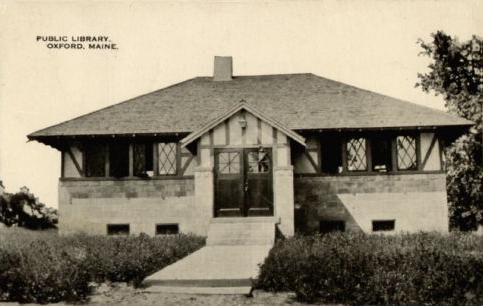
Freeland Holmes Library in 1916

== Demographics ==
Historical population
Census	Pop.	Note	%±
1800	69		—
1830	1,116		—
1840	1,254		12.4%
1850	1,233		−1.7%
1860	1,281		3.9%
1870	1,631		27.3%
1880	1,655		1.5%
1890	1,455		−12.1%
1900	1,331		−8.5%
1910	1,221		−8.3%
1920	1,097		−10.2%
1930	1,125		2.6%
1940	1,316		17.0%
1950	1,569		19.2%
1960	1,658		5.7%
1970	1,892		14.1%
1980	3,143		66.1%
1990	3,705		17.9%
2000	3,960		6.9%
2010	4,110		3.8%
2020	4,229		2.9%
U.S. Decennial Census

=== 2010 census ===
As of the census of 2010, there were 4,110 people, 1,657 households, and 1,107 families living in the town. The population density was 106.1 inhabitants per square mile (41.0/km^{2}). There were 2,170 housing units at an average density of 56.0 per square mile (21.6/km^{2}). The racial makeup of the town was 97.2% White, 0.3% African American, 0.4% Native American, 0.1% Asian, 0.2% from other races, and 1.7% from two or more races. Hispanic or Latino of any race were 1.1% of the population.

There were 1,657 households, of which 31.0% had children under the age of 18 living with them, 50.6% were married couples living together, 10.2% had a female householder with no husband present, 6.0% had a male householder with no wife present, and 33.2% were non-families. 23.2% of all households were made up of individuals, and 8.5% had someone living alone who was 65 years of age or older. The average household size was 2.48 and the average family size was 2.88.

The median age in the town was 42.4 years. 21.8% of residents were under the age of 18; 6.9% were between the ages of 18 and 24; 25.4% were from 25 to 44; 32.2% were from 45 to 64; and 13.8% were 65 years of age or older. The gender makeup of the town was 50.1% male and 49.9% female.

=== 2000 census ===
As of the census of 2000, there were 3,960 people, 1,487 households, and 1,094 families living in the town. The population density was 102.3 inhabitants per square mile (39.5/km^{2}). There were 1,926 housing units at an average density of 49.8 per square mile (19.2/km^{2}). The racial makeup of the town was 97.88% White, 0.25% Black or African American, 0.25% Native American, 0.28% Asian, 0.03% Pacific Islander, 0.23% from other races, and 1.09% from two or more races. Hispanic or Latino of any race were 0.63% of the population.

There were 1,487 households, out of which 36.0% had children under the age of 18 living with them, 58.8% were married couples living together, 9.1% had a female householder with no husband present, and 26.4% were non-families. 19.0% of all households were made up of individuals, and 8.2% had someone living alone who was 65 years of age or older. The average household size was 2.66 and the average family size was 3.00.

In the town, the population was spread out, with 26.5% under the age of 18, 6.6% from 18 to 24, 30.4% from 25 to 44, 24.4% from 45 to 64, and 12.1% who were 65 years of age or older. The median age was 38 years. For every 100 females, there were 96.6 males. For every 100 females age 18 and over, there were 94.5 males.

The median income for a household in the town was $36,670, and the median income for a family was $38,438. Males had a median income of $27,957 versus $20,392 for females. The per capita income for the town was $15,480. About 2.8% of families and 7.1% of the population were below the poverty line, including 4.6% of those under age 18 and 12.0% of those age 65 or over.

== Government ==
The town of Oxford is governed by an elected, five-person Board of Selectmen each of which serve staggered three-year terms and an appointed town manager.

As of May 2026: the Town Manager is Adam Garland; the town's police department consists of one Chief of Police, one captain, one sergeant, four officers, one school resource officer, and three reserve officers; the town's fire & rescue department is run by a fire chief, deputy chief, captain, lieutenant, and two privates.

== See also ==
- Grand Trunk Station (Oxford, ME)
