= Gray (CDP), Maine =

Gray, Maine
- Census-designated place
- Location in Cumberland County and the state of Maine
- Coordinates: 43°52′45″N 70°19′17″W
- Country: United States
- State: Maine
- County: Cumberland
- Town: Gray

Area
  - Total: 2.93 sq mi (7.60 km^{2})
  - Land: 2.93 sq mi (7.60 km^{2})
  - Water: 0 sq mi (0.00 km^{2})
- Elevation: 335 ft (102 m)

Population (2020)
  - Total: 887
  - Density: 302.2/sq mi (116.68/km^{2})
- Time zone: UTC-5 (Eastern (EST))
  - Summer (DST): UTC-4 (EDT)
- ZIP Code: 04039
- Area code: 207
- FIPS code: 23-28835
- GNIS feature ID: 2583558

Gray is a census-designated place (CDP) within the town of Gray, in Cumberland County, Maine, United States. The population was 884 at the 2010 census., comprising 11.4% of the town's population of 7,761.

Gray (CDP) consists largely of the center of the Town of Gray known as Gray Village. It is part of the Portland–South Portland–Biddeford, Maine Metropolitan Statistical Area.

== Geography ==
According to the United States Census Bureau, the CDP has a total area of 2.9 square miles (7.6 km^{2}), all land.

== Demographics ==
Historical population
Census	Pop.	Note	%±
2020	887		—
U.S. Decennial Census
