= Hebron, Maine =

Town in Maine, United States

- Town
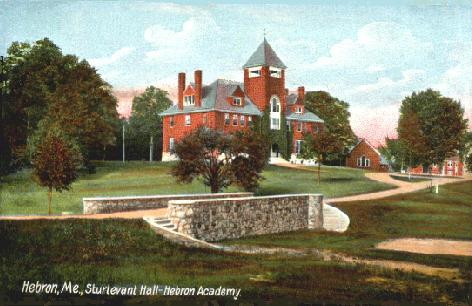
- Sturtevant Hall, Hebron Academy

- Location within Maine Location within the United States
- Coordinates: 44°13′24″N 70°23′44″W
- Country: United States
- State: Maine
- County: Oxford
- Incorporated: 1792

Area
  - Total: 22.54 sq mi (58.38 km^{2})
  - Land: 22.41 sq mi (58.04 km^{2})
  - Water: 0.13 sq mi (0.34 km^{2})
- Elevation: 597 ft (182 m)

Population (2020)
  - Total: 1,223
  - Density: 55/sq mi (21.1/km^{2})
- Time zone: UTC-5 (Eastern (EST))
  - Summer (DST): UTC-4 (EDT)
- ZIP code: 04238
- Area code: 207
- FIPS code: 23-32370
- GNIS feature ID: 582516
- Website: hebronmaine.org

Hebron is a town in Oxford County, Maine, United States. Hebron is included in the Lewiston-Auburn, Maine metropolitan New England City and Town Area. The town's history has always been interconnected with Hebron Academy, a co-ed college preparatory boarding school which is located in the town's heart. The population was 1,223 at the 2020 census. There is an elementary school, Hebron Station School, located on Station Road.

== History ==
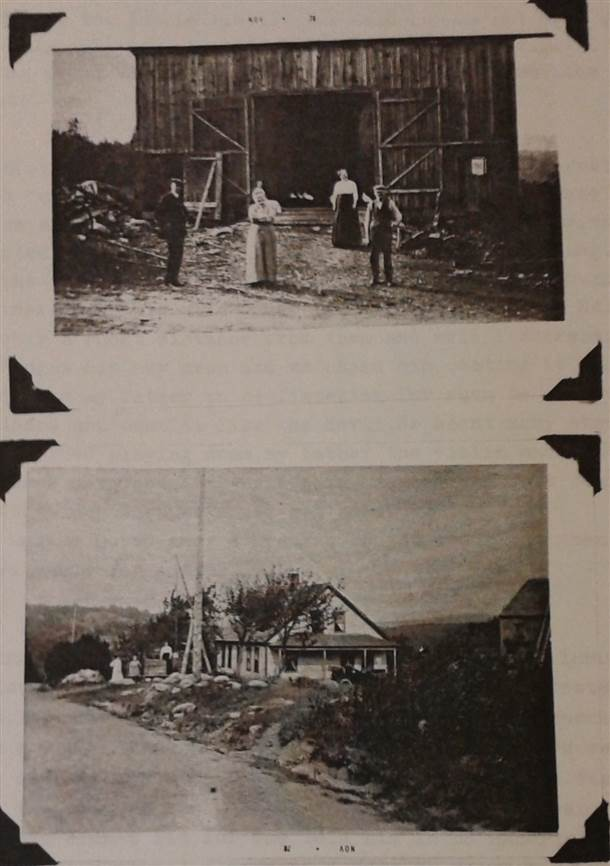
Moses Snell Homestead

It was granted on March 8, 1777, by the Massachusetts General Court to Alexander Shepard, Jr. of Newton, Massachusetts as payment for a survey chart of the Maine coast that he had assisted making. It was named Shepardsfield Plantation, although early inhabitants called it Bog Brook Plantation. There was a farm settled in 1764 on what is now Sodom Road in Hebron before the Revolution and the grant to Alexander Shepard Jr. The first settlers of Shepardsfield Plantation were Captain Daniel Buckman and his family in 1778. Others followed, many fresh from the battlefields of the Revolutionary War. On February 27, 1829, Hebron's southwestern half was set off and incorporated as the town of Oxford.

Agriculture was the principal occupation, with hay the chief crop. In addition, the town had fine orchards. The outlet of Marshall Pond, the largest body of water, provided power for mills. There was a sawmill, shingle mill, pail factory, blacksmith shop and shoe shop. In 1804, Deacon William Barrows, Jr. was instrumental in founding Hebron Academy. The town would be crossed by the Rumford Falls and Buckfield Railroad. The Western Maine Sanatorium opened at Hebron in 1904, the first of its kind in the state. It treated tuberculosis patients with rest, fresh air and a healthy diet. Taken over by the state in 1915, it closed in 1959.

== Geography ==
According to the United States Census Bureau, the town has a total area of 22.54 square miles (58.38 km^{2}), of which 22.41 square miles (58.04 km^{2}) is land and 0.13 square miles (0.34 km^{2}) is water. Hebron is drained by Cobb, Cushman, Bicknell and Allen brooks.

The town is crossed by Maine State Route 119. It borders the towns of Buckfield to the north, Oxford to the south, Paris to the west, and Turner and Minot to the east.

Hebron is known for the Rubellite Tourmaline, found on Mt. Rubellite in Hebron Center.

== Demographics ==
Historical population
Census	Pop.	Note	%±
1800	981		—
1810	1,211		23.4%
1820	1,727		42.6%
1830	915		−47.0%
1840	945		3.3%
1850	839		−11.2%
1860	895		6.7%
1870	744		−16.9%
1880	601		−19.2%
1890	600		−0.2%
1900	494		−17.7%
1910	603		22.1%
1920	652		8.1%
1930	791		21.3%
1940	678		−14.3%
1950	829		22.3%
1960	465		−43.9%
1970	532		14.4%
1980	665		25.0%
1990	878		32.0%
2000	1,053		19.9%
2010	1,416		34.5%
2020	1,223		−13.6%
U.S. Decennial Census

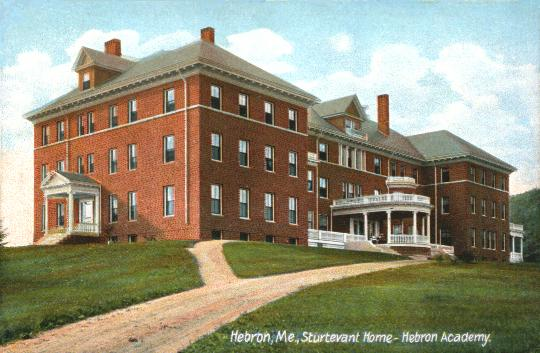
Sturtevant Home in 1907

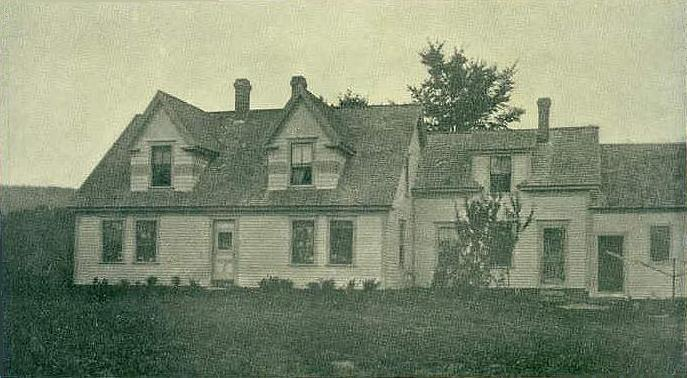
Mountain View Cottage, c. 1905

=== 2010 census ===
As of the census of 2010, there were 1,416 people, 449 households, and 343 families living in the town. The population density was 63.2 inhabitants per square mile (24.4/km^{2}). There were 483 housing units at an average density of 21.6 per square mile (8.3/km^{2}). The racial makeup of the town was 93.9% White, 1.1% African American, 0.3% Native American, 3.5% Asian, and 1.3% from two or more races. Hispanic or Latino of any race were 1.6% of the population.

There were 449 households, of which 38.1% had children under the age of 18 living with them, 59.5% were married couples living together, 9.6% had a female householder with no husband present, 7.3% had a male householder with no wife present, and 23.6% were non-families. 15.6% of all households were made up of individuals, and 3.5% had someone living alone who was 65 years of age or older. The average household size was 2.76 and the average family size was 3.05.

The median age in the town was 33.4 years. 29.8% of residents were under the age of 18; 10.8% were between the ages of 18 and 24; 24.2% were from 25 to 44; 28.4% were from 45 to 64; and 7.1% were 65 years of age or older. The gender makeup of the town was 52.6% male and 47.4% female.

=== 2000 census ===
As of the census of 2000, there were 1,053 people, 389 households, and 296 families living in the town. The population density was 47.0 inhabitants per square mile (18.1/km^{2}). There were 410 housing units at an average density of 18.3 per square mile (7.1/km^{2}). The racial makeup of the town was 97.82% White, 0.09% African American, 0.19% Native American, 0.57% Asian, 0.19% from other races, and 1.14% from two or more races. Hispanic or Latino of any race were 0.76% of the population.

There were 389 households, out of which 41.4% had children under the age of 18 living with them, 63.0% were married couples living together, 6.7% had a female householder with no husband present, and 23.7% were non-families. 18.8% of all households were made up of individuals, and 5.7% had someone living alone who was 65 years of age or older. The average household size was 2.71 and the average family size was 3.07.

In the town, the population was spread out, with 27.4% under the age of 18, 7.5% from 18 to 24, 31.7% from 25 to 44, 26.5% from 45 to 64, and 6.9% who were 65 years of age or older. The median age was 37 years. For every 100 females, there were 103.3 males. For every 100 females age 18 and over, there were 101.3 males.

The median income for a household in the town was $45,417, and the median income for a family was $47,292. Males had a median income of $30,529 versus $22,900 for females. The per capita income for the town was $19,086. About 3.0% of families and 4.6% of the population were below the poverty line, including 7.1% of those under age 18 and 2.9% of those age 65 or over.

== Notable people ==
- Horace A. Barrows, 19th century physician
- Albion K. Parris, US senator, fifth governor of Maine
