= Sebago =

Sebago may refer to:

== Places ==
- Lake Sebago, New York, US
- Sebago, Maine, US, a town
- Sebago Lake, Maine
  - Sebago Lake State Park, on the above lake
  - Point Sebago, on the shore of the above lake

== Ships ==
- USCGC Sebago (1930), a US Coast Guard ship, later used by the Royal Navy, renamed HMS Walney Y04 during World War II
- USCGC Sebago (WHEC-42), a class of cutter used by the US Coast Guard
- USS Sebago (1861), a steamer used by the Union Navy in the American Civil War

== Other uses ==
- Sebago (company), an American shoe company based in Maine
- The Sebago Granite, a Carboniferous aged granite in southern Maine
- Sebago potato, a potato cultivar common in Australia
