= Songo Lock =

- U.S. National Register of Historic Places
- U.S. Historic district – Contributing property
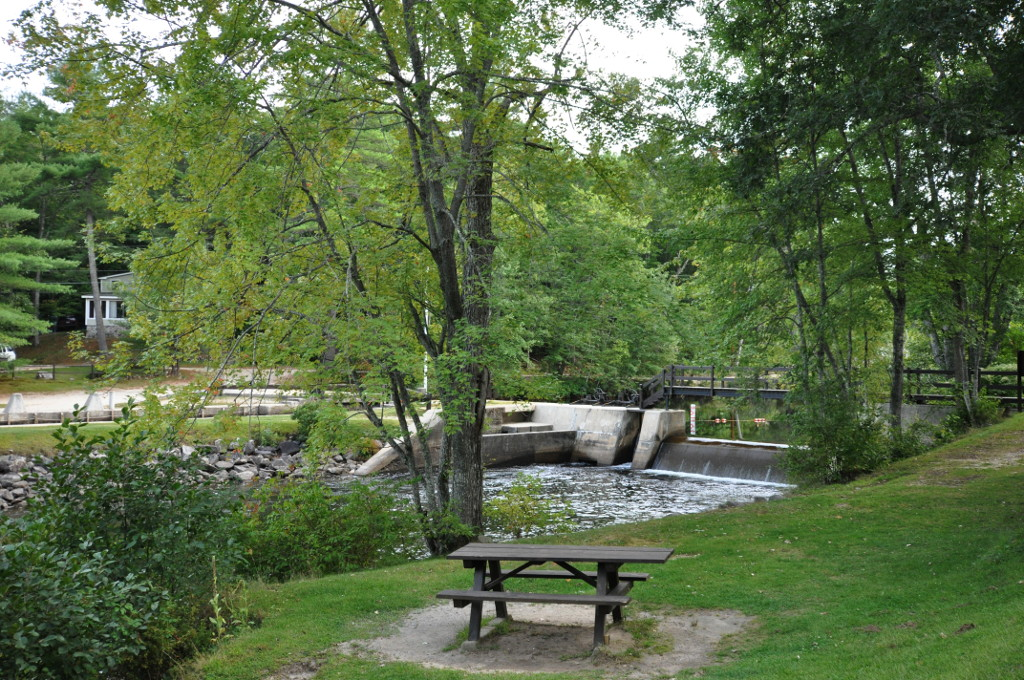

- Location within Maine Location within the United States
- Location: Songo River, Sebago Lake State Park, Naples, Maine
- Coordinates: 43°55′55″N 70°34′48″W
- Area: 1.8 acres (0.73 ha)
- Built: 1830
- Part of: Cumberland and Oxford Canal (ID74000317)
- NRHP reference No.: 70000093

Significant dates
- Added to NRHP: February 16, 1970
- Designated CP: November 1, 1974

Songo Lock is the last surviving lock of the Cumberland and Oxford Canal, a 19th-century canal in southern Maine, United States. The lock is located on the Songo River, just above its confluence with the Crooked River at the northern end of Sebago Lake State Park in the town of Naples. The lock, built in 1830, is now used primarily during the summer months by pleasure craft. It was listed on the National Register of Historic Places in 1970 and designated as a Maine Historic Civil Engineering Landmark by the American Society of Civil Engineers in 2001.

== Description and history ==
The Cumberland and Oxford Canal was conceived in the early 19th century as a means to transports raw materials and goods between the harbor of Portland, Maine and the upland interior as far north as Bridgton and Harrison on Long Lake. The canal was completed in 1830, the year Songo Lock was finished, and operated as a commercial transport enterprise until 1870. Songo Lock was one of the 28 locks built for the canal, and provides a major transit point between Sebago Lake and Brandy Pond, the southernmost portion of Long Lake. The lock underwent enlargement and some modernization in 1911 by the Sebago Lake Improvement Company, which was developing the area as a summer resort destination. It is now maintained by the state as part of Sebago Lake State Park.

When built in 1830, the lock was 90 feet (27 m) long and 26 feet (7.9 m) wide, and was built to one side of an artificial rubblestone island, part of a scheme to divert the slow-flowing river around the construction site. The sides of the lock are granite, and its original control gates were wooden. When the lock was rebuilt in 1911, it was enlarged to be 110 feet (34 m) long and 28 feet (8.5 m) wide, it was given iron gates, and the walls were faced in concrete.

== See also ==
- National Register of Historic Places listings in Cumberland County, Maine
