= Scribner Homestead =

Historic house in Maine, United States

- U.S. National Register of Historic Places
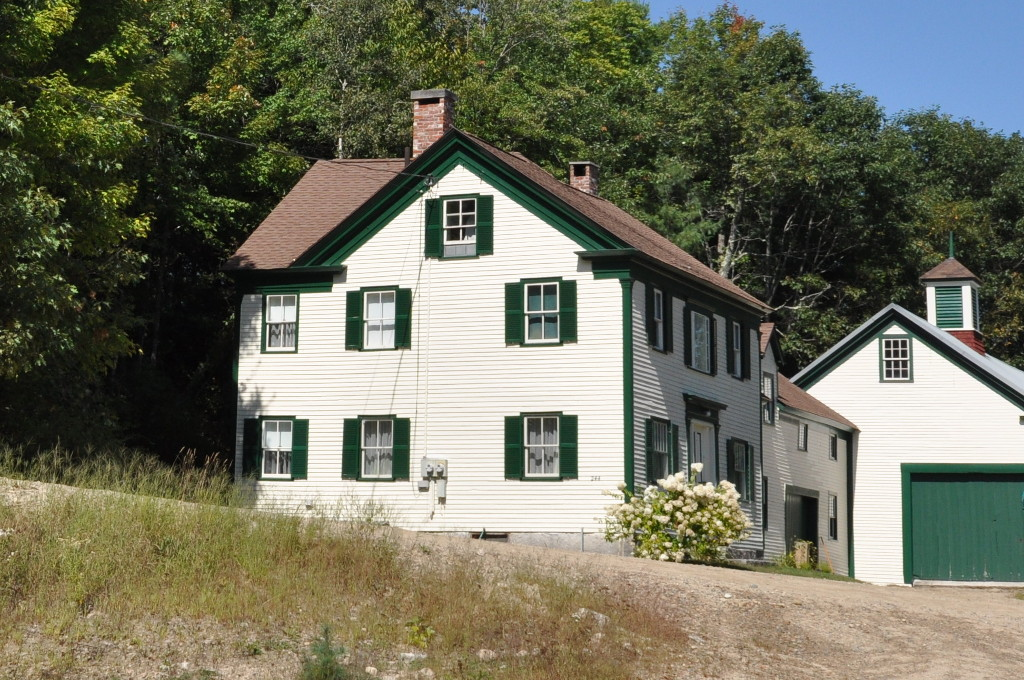

- Location within Maine Location within the United States
- Nearest city: 244 Scribner's Mill Rd., Harrison, Maine
- Coordinates: 44°5′10″N 70°36′22″W
- Area: 4 acres (1.6 ha)
- Built: 1849
- Architectural style: Greek Revival
- NRHP reference No.: 01000368
- Added to NRHP: April 12, 2001

The Scribner Homestead is a historic house at 244 Scribner's Mill Road in Harrison, Maine. Built in 1849, it was for several generations home to the operators of the adjacent Barrows-Scribner Mill, and is a well-preserved example of vernacular Greek Revival architecture. It was listed on the National Register of Historic Places in 2001.

== Description and history ==
The Scribner Homestead stands in a remote rural area of eastern Harrison, on the north side of Scribner's Mill Road just west of the Crooked River, which forms Harrison's eastern border with Otisfield. The mill complex is located on the south side of the road, directly abutting the river. The homestead is a typical 19th-century connected house, with a 2 1/2-story main block connected via an extended wing to a barn. The main block is oriented facing east, and is finished in clapboards and set on a stone foundation. It has a gabled roof, with a short gable-roofed ell extending to the west. The front facade is three bays wide, with a center entrance flanked by sidelight windows and pilasters, and topped by an entablature. The interior has a center hall plan, with an early 20th-century kitchen in the western ell.

The mill complex, a small collection of wood-frame buildings (now partially rebuilt after suffering extensive weather-related damage), was established in the late 1840s by Dr. Horace Barrows. The exact construction date of the house is not known, but it appears to have been between 1849 and 1851, when Barrows sold the property, with house, to Elijah Scribner. The house and mill remained in the hands of Scribner descendants until 1984, when the mill was sold to Scribner's Mill Preservation, and the house to an individual associated with that preservation organization.

== See also ==
- National Register of Historic Places listings in Cumberland County, Maine
