= Trickey Pond =

Lake in Cumberland County, Maine, United States

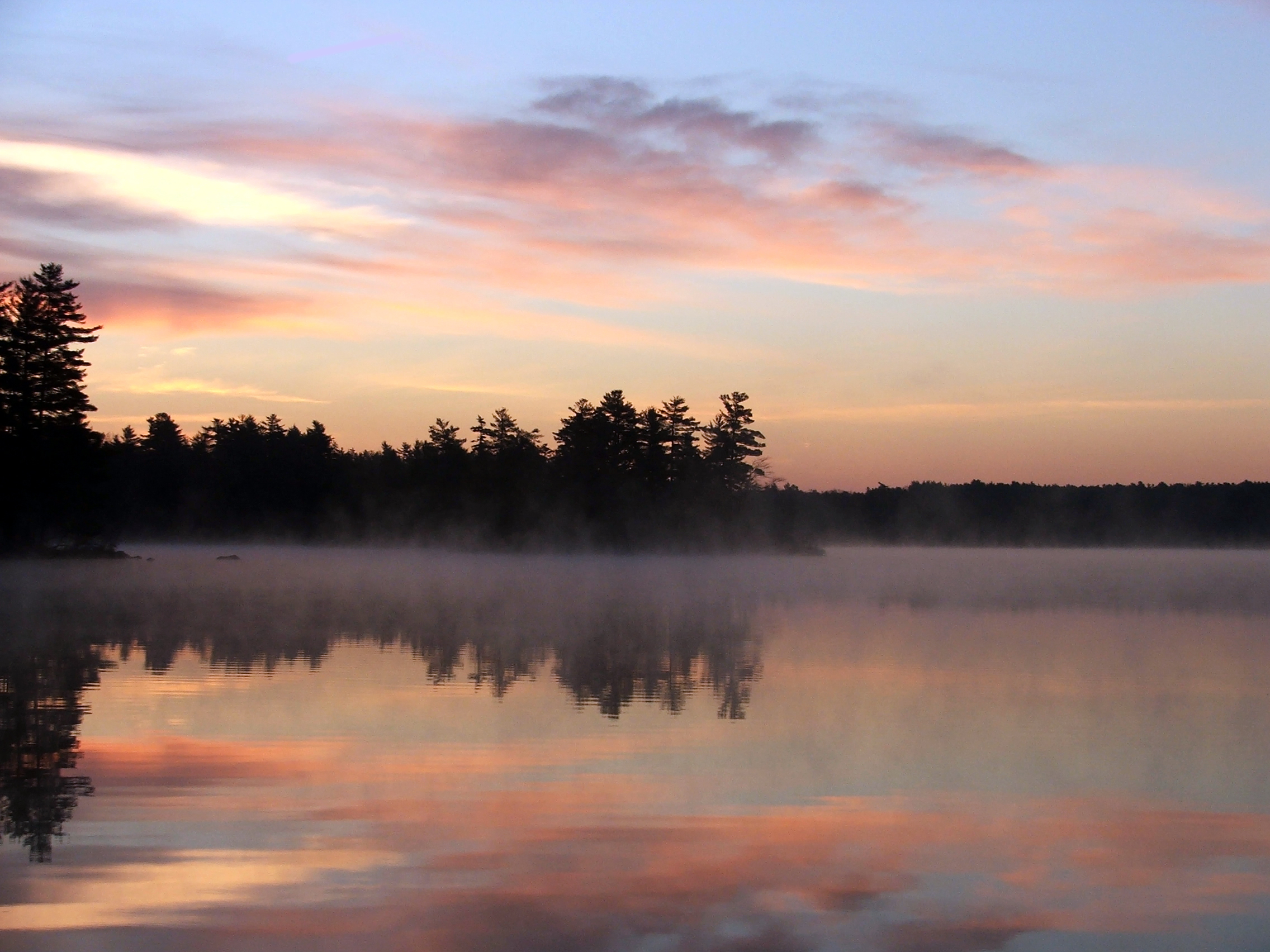

- Location within Maine Location within the United States
- Location: Naples, Maine
- Coordinates: 43°56′31″N 70°36′29″W
- Basin countries: United States
- Surface area: 311 acres (126 ha)
- Max. depth: 55 ft (17 m)
- Surface elevation: 358 ft (109 m)

Trickey Pond is a water body in the U.S. state of Maine. Its maximum depth is 55 feet (17 m). The lack of serious pollution in the area contributes to the pond's remarkably good water clarity. At most points in the pond, the entire depth can be seen.

== Location ==
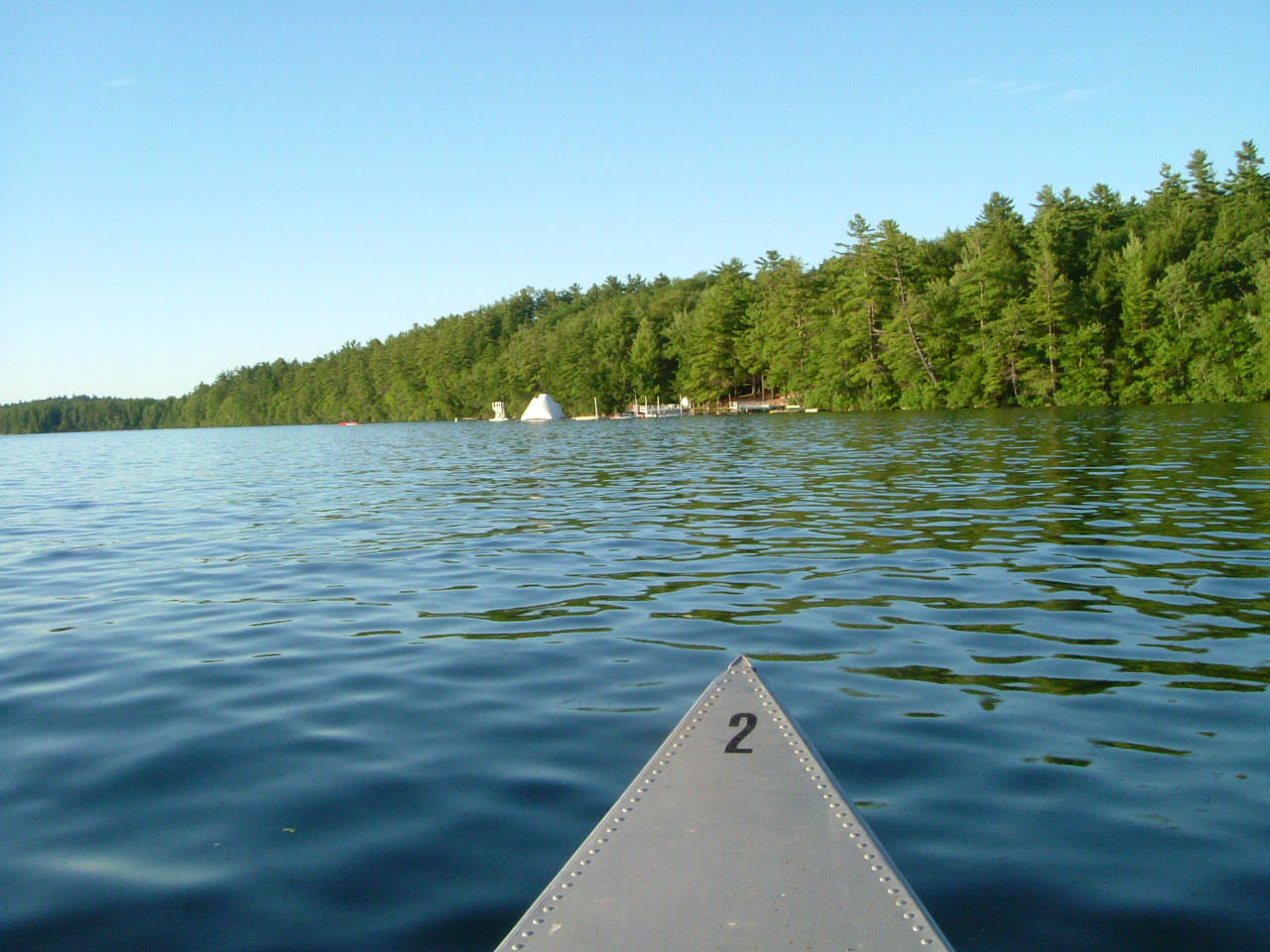
Canoeing on Trickey Pond

Trickey Pond is located between Sebago Cove (an arm of Sebago Lake) and Brandy Pond, both in the town of Naples. Although the pond's outlet to Sebago Cove flows continuously, the pond has no visible inlets, suggesting Trickey has some active springs. There are two access points: one at the north end, one at the south. Trickey Pond is also home to Camp Skylemar, a summer camp for boys. The camp's waterfront includes swimming lanes, a large inflatable iceberg, waterskiing, wakeboarding, kayaking, and canoeing. Trickey Pond also includes Loon's Haven Family Campground, the only campground on Trickey Pond, that features two sandy beaches, three boat docks, and canoe and kayak and fishing opportunities for campground guests.

== Size ==
The pond's area is 311 acres (1.26 km^{2}), with a depth of less than 60 feet (18 m). In late summer, the near-surface temperature is roughly 75 °F (24 °C), while the bottom temperature is about 50 °F (10 °C).

== Naming ==
Earlier in the 20th century, the body of water was referred to as "Wenonah Pond". The girl's camp, located on the eastern shore, was named and founded during this period. By the late 1960s, the pond was referred to as "Trickey Pond" when private lots were sold on the western banks. The reason for the name change is unknown.

== Fish ==
The species of fish in the lake, when last surveyed by the Maine Department of Inland Fisheries and Wildlife in 1996, are:

- Salmon
- Lake trout
- Brook trout
- Splake
- Rainbow smelt
- Smallmouth bass
- Largemouth bass
- Yellow perch
- Chain pickerel
- Minnows
- Golden shiner
- White sucker
- Hornpout
- Banded killifish
- Sunfish
- Sculpin
- American Eel

.
