= Harrison, Maine =

Town in Maine, United States

- Town
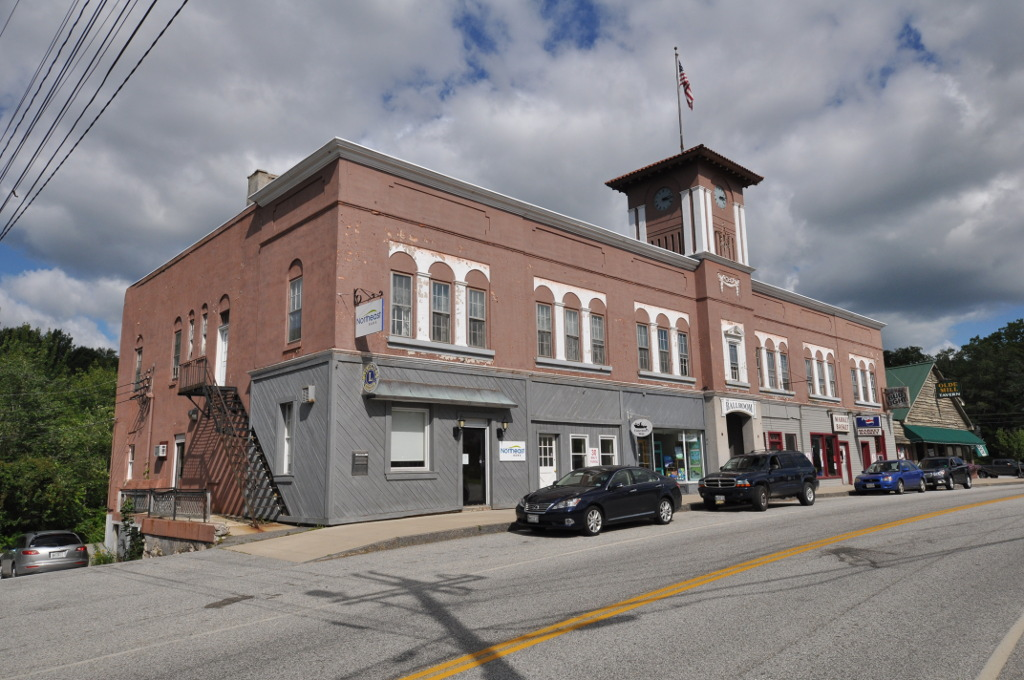
- The Main Block Building (2014)

- Seal

- Location in Cumberland County and the state of Maine.
- Coordinates: 44°06′24″N 70°38′26″W
- Country: United States
- State: Maine
- County: Cumberland
- Incorporated: 1805
- Villages: Harrison; Bolsters Mills

Area
  - Total: 36.81 sq mi (95.34 km^{2})
  - Land: 33.19 sq mi (85.96 km^{2})
  - Water: 3.62 sq mi (9.38 km^{2})
- Elevation: 420 ft (130 m)

Population (2020)
  - Total: 2,447
  - Density: 74/sq mi (28.5/km^{2})
- Time zone: UTC-5 (Eastern (EST))
  - Summer (DST): UTC-4 (EDT)
- ZIP code: 04040
- Area code: 207
- FIPS code: 23-31600
- GNIS feature ID: 582513
- Website: www.harrisonmaine.org

Harrison is a town in Cumberland County, Maine, United States. The population was 2,447 at the 2020 census. A historic resort area, Harrison straddles Long Lake and Crystal Lake. It is part of the Portland-South Portland-Biddeford metropolitan area.

== History ==
The Massachusetts General Court granted Otis Field Plantation in 1771 to James Otis and other heirs of Captain John Gorham and his company for their service in the 1690 Battle of Quebec. It replaced a 1736 grant which had been ruled invalid. In 1797, the plantation was incorporated as Otisfield. On March 8, 1805, Harrison was set off and incorporated from portions of Otisfield and Bridgton. It was named after a principal landowner, Harrison Gray Otis of Boston, the heir of James Otis.

In the autumn of 1792, two brothers from Gorham, John and Nathan Carsley, built a camp and cleared land in Harrison. During the winter they returned to Gorham, coming back in March 1793 with their wives. Because John Carsley and his wife remained in Harrison when Nathan Carsley and his wife resumed living in Gorham until 1796, he is considered the town's first permanent settler. More pioneers arrived, living in log houses chinked with moss. The outlet of Crystal Lake into Long Lake provided water power for industry, and James Sampson erected at Harrison village the first sawmill and gristmill. Over the years other industries followed, including a wire-making business, blacksmithy, shingle mill, harness-maker, foundry, carriage maker, clothing maker and shoe shop. Scribner's Mill (now a museum) was built in 1847 on the Crooked River. On the Bear River, in 1867 the Harrison Water Power Company established the Bear River Woolen Mill, destroyed by fire in 1872.

In 1832, the Cumberland and Oxford Canal opened, connecting Portland with Sebago Lake. A series of 27 locks lifted vessels from sea level at Casco Bay to Sebago Lake, 270 feet (82 m) above sea level. From there they traveled up the Songo River to Brandy Pond, then continued along the Chute River to Long Lake. As the company name indicates, the canal was originally planned to reach Oxford County, but instead terminated at Harrison. The town became a center for trade and transportation, with wharves and warehouses lining the shore.

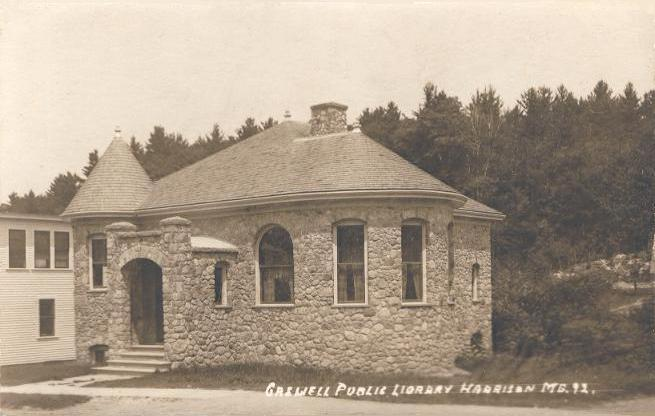
Caswell Library in 1914, built in 1908 and now on the National Register of Historic Places

In 1847, the Sebago & Long Pond Steam Navigation Company built Fawn, the first steamboat to ply the lakes and waterways. It had a shallow draft to navigate the winding Songo River, with passengers asked to shift sides as ballast to keep both paddlewheels in the water around sharp curves. The lakes became a popular summer tourist destination, with The Elm House (later called The Elms Inn) opening in 1860. When the Portland and Ogdensburg Railroad commenced service to Sebago Lake Station in 1870, the canal was abandoned as obsolete. Beginning in 1898, the Bridgton and Saco River Railroad, a narrow gauge line, delivered freight and passengers directly to Harrison.

In 1906, the Harrison Hotel opened. Camp Kineo operated beside Long Lake as a camp for boys. Today, Harrison remains a recreational area. Harrison is also home to Fernwood Cove, a half-season summer camp for girls on the same spot as Camp Chickawah was. It is located on Island Pond.

In 1936 the Historic Deertrees Theatre was built by Enrica Clay Dillon and is still home to countless theatre, opera and music performances, including the Sebago Long Lake Music Festival.

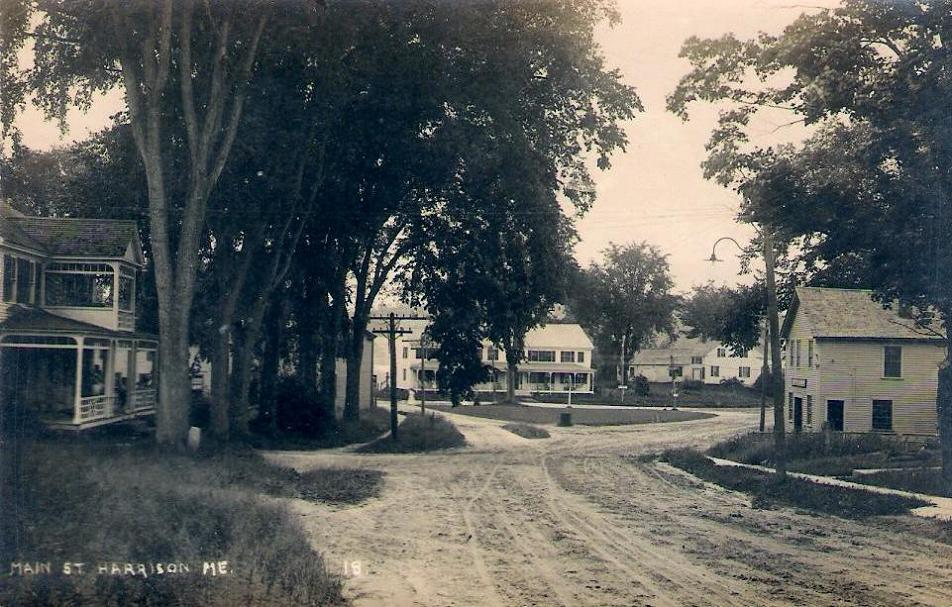
Main Street in 1912

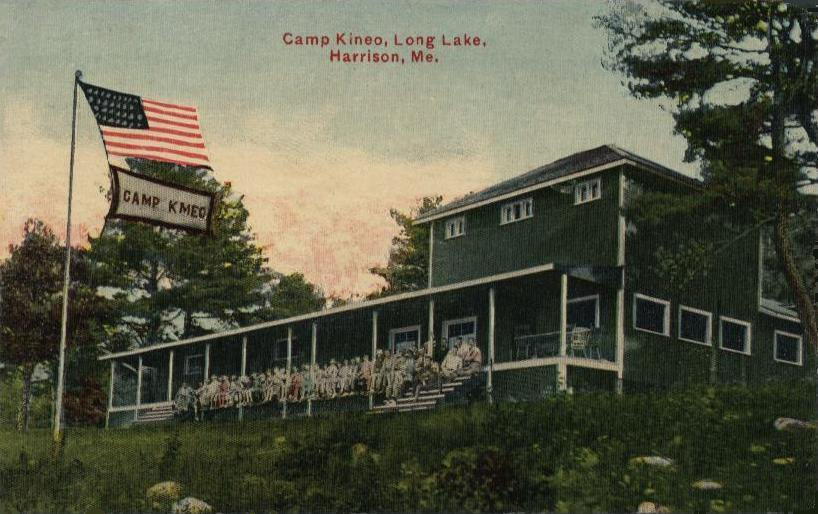
Camp Kineo in 1914

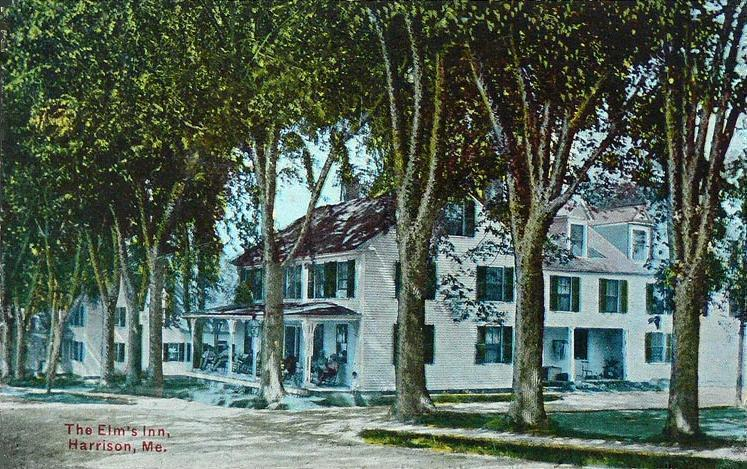
The Elms Inn in 1910

== Geography ==
According to the United States Census Bureau, the town has a total area of 36.81 square miles (95.34 km^{2}), of which 33.19 square miles (85.96 km^{2}) is land and 3.62 square miles (9.38 km^{2}) is water. Harrison is drained by the Bear River and Crooked River.

The Maine state routes that cross through Harrison are 35 and 117. Harrison is bordered by the town of Bridgton to its west, Waterford and Norway to its north, Otisfield to its east, and Naples to its south.

=== Crystal Lake ===
Crystal Lake
- Location within Maine
- Coordinates: 44°07′N 70°40′W
- Primary outflows: Long Lake
- Basin countries: United States
- Max. length: 1.5 mi (2.4 km)
- Surface area: 446 acres (180 ha)
- Max. depth: 65 feet (20 m)
- Water volume: 14,254 acre⋅ft (17,582,000 m^{3})
- Surface elevation: 308 ft (94 m)

Crystal Lake (formerly Anonymous Pond) is north of Long Lake, and overflows into Long Lake through downtown Harrison. Smallmouth bass thrive in the lake, with a few lake trout.

== Demographics ==
Historical population
Census	Pop.	Note	%±
1810	439		—
1820	789		79.7%
1830	1,068		35.4%
1840	1,243		16.4%
1850	1,416		13.9%
1860	1,251		−11.7%
1870	1,219		−2.6%
1880	1,168		−4.2%
1890	1,071		−8.3%
1900	969		−9.5%
1910	967		−0.2%
1920	901		−6.8%
1930	966		7.2%
1940	1,026		6.2%
1950	1,026		0.0%
1960	1,014		−1.2%
1970	1,045		3.1%
1980	1,667		59.5%
1990	1,951		17.0%
2000	2,315		18.7%
2010	2,730		17.9%
2020	2,447		−10.4%
U.S. Decennial Census

=== 2010 census ===
As of the census of 2010, there were 2,730 people, 1,113 households, and 779 families living in the town. The population density was 82.3 inhabitants per square mile (31.8/km^{2}). There were 1,761 housing units at an average density of 53.1 per square mile (20.5/km^{2}). The racial makeup of the town was 97.4% White, 0.3% African American, 0.7% Native American, 0.2% Asian, 0.3% from other races, and 1.1% from two or more races. Hispanic or Latino of any race were 0.9% of the population.

There were 1,113 households, of which 29.6% had children under the age of 18 living with them, 55.6% were married couples living together, 8.7% had a female householder with no husband present, 5.7% had a male householder with no wife present, and 30.0% were non-families. 23.0% of all households were made up of individuals, and 8.5% had someone living alone who was 65 years of age or older. The average household size was 2.45 and the average family size was 2.84.

The median age in the town was 45.3 years. 21.3% of residents were under the age of 18; 5.2% were between the ages of 18 and 24; 23.2% were from 25 to 44; 35% were from 45 to 64; and 15.5% were 65 years of age or older. The gender makeup of the town was 51.3% male and 48.7% female.

=== 2000 census ===
As of the census of 2000, there were 2,315 people, 920 households, and 662 families living in the town. The population density was 70.1 inhabitants per square mile (27.1/km^{2}). There were 1,430 housing units at an average density of 43.3 per square mile (16.7/km^{2}). The racial makeup of the town was 98.79% White, 0.52% African American, 0.04% Native American, 0.04% Pacific Islander, and 0.60% from two or more races. Hispanic or Latino of any race were 0.52% of the population.

There were 920 households, out of which 32.7% had children under the age of 18 living with them, 57.1% were married couples living together, 9.3% had a female householder with no husband present, and 28.0% were non-families. 22.6% of all households were made up of individuals, and 9.6% had someone living alone who was 65 years of age or older. The average household size was 2.52 and the average family size was 2.90.

In the town, the population was spread out, with 25.4% under the age of 18, 5.7% from 18 to 24, 28.6% from 25 to 44, 27.1% from 45 to 64, and 13.3% who were 65 years of age or older. The median age was 40 years. For every 100 females, there were 96.9 males. For every 100 females age 18 and over, there were 96.0 males.

The median income for a household in the town was $35,478, and the median income for a family was $42,159. Males had a median income of $30,726 versus $22,311 for females. The per capita income for the town was $17,898. About 6.9% of families and 9.3% of the population were below the poverty line, including 9.8% of those under age 18 and 5.9% of those age 65 or over.

== Notable people ==
- Horace A. Barrows, a 19th-century physician and advocate of vegetarian diet
- Edward H. Hill, founder of Central Maine Medical Center
- Melville E. Ingalls, Massachusetts state legislator and railroad president
- George Lakin, US senator from Wisconsin and United States District Attorney
- Frank Edward Lowe, U. S. Army Major General, advisor to US President Harry Truman
