= Pleasant Lake (Crooked River) =

Lake in Maine, United States

- Location within Maine Location within the United States
- Location: Maine
- Coordinates: 44°02′N 70°31′W
- Primary outflows: Mill Brook
- Basin countries: United States
- Max. length: 3.8 mi (6.1 km)
- Surface area: 1,332 acres (539 ha)
- Max. depth: 62 feet (19 m)
- Water volume: 40,125 acre⋅ft (49,493,000 m^{3})
- Surface elevation: 427 ft (130 m)

Pleasant Lake is a lake in Maine, United States. It extends through southern Otisfield into northern Casco. The lake shoreline is heavily developed with residences and seasonal cabins. It is one of the finest spring fed lakes in the state. The southern end of the lake overflows as Mill Brook through the village of Casco, and reaches the Crooked River 3 miles (4.8 km) to the southwest. The lake supports naturally reproducing populations of white perch, smallmouth bass, largemouth bass and chain pickerel; and is stocked frequently with brown trout, lake trout, and land-locked Atlantic salmon. Fishing tournaments happen a few times each summer. A public boat launch and small beach area is located at the southern end of the lake.

Seeds of Peace, an international conflict resolution summer camp, is based on Pleasant Lake.
