= Nutting Homestead =

Historic house in Maine, United States

- The Nutting Homestead
- U.S. National Register of Historic Places
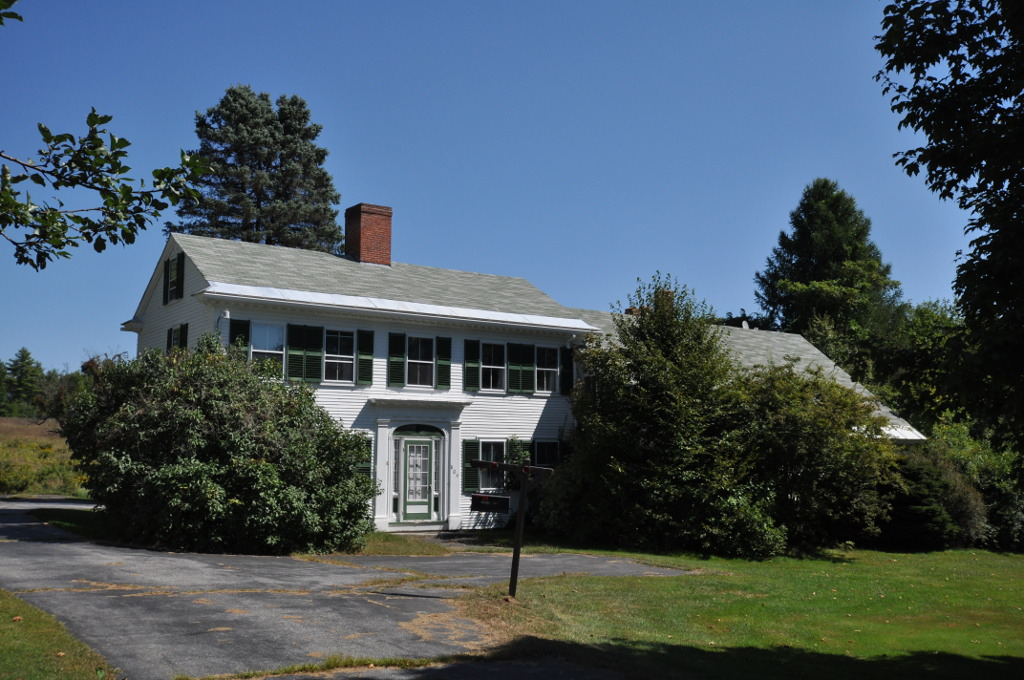

- Location within Maine Location within the United States
- Nearest city: Otisfield, Maine
- Coordinates: 44°4′14″N 70°32′37″W
- Area: 1 acre (0.40 ha)
- Built: 1796
- Built by: Nathan Nutting Jr.
- Architectural style: Federal, Cape Cod
- NRHP reference No.: 74000163
- Added to NRHP: December 3, 1974

The Nutting Homestead is a historic farm complex on Maine State Route 121, south of the center of Otisfield, Maine. The property has been owned by the Nutting family and its descendants since the late 18th century and exemplifies the adaptive use of farm properties over time. The oldest portion of the farmhouse dates to 1796, and other buildings in the complex date mainly to the 19th century. The property was listed on the National Register of Historic Places in 1974.

Nathan Nutting, a native of Groton, Massachusetts, purchased the land for his house in 1796 and built a modest 1 1/2-story Cape style house. His son, Nathan, Jr., was sent to Boston for education, and he studied architecture and construction. After his return to Otisfield, he built the Federal-style main block of the present house, attaching his father's original Cape to the right side. Nathan, Jr. is also locally notable as the builder of the Bell Hill Meetinghouse and other area churches, and he operated a sawmill and manufactured carpentry tools.

The main block of the house is a 2 1/2-story wood-frame structure, five bays wide, with a large central chimney. The main entrance is centered on the facade and features sidelight windows and a louvered fan above. It is framed by pilasters supporting a pediment and Doric columns and entablature. The cornice is studded with modillions. The south (right) side of the house is joined to the 1 1/2-story Cape, which is also five bays wide with a center entrance framed by pilasters. This section originally had a central chimney, but this was removed in the late 19th century in favor of smaller end chimneys, to which wood stoves were connected. The overhanging roof suggests that it is also a later 19th-century alteration.

The rest of the farm complex includes three 19th-century buildings: a barn, carriage house, and corn crib.

== See also ==
- National Register of Historic Places listings in Oxford County, Maine
