= Cumberland and Oxford Canal =

- U.S. National Register of Historic Places
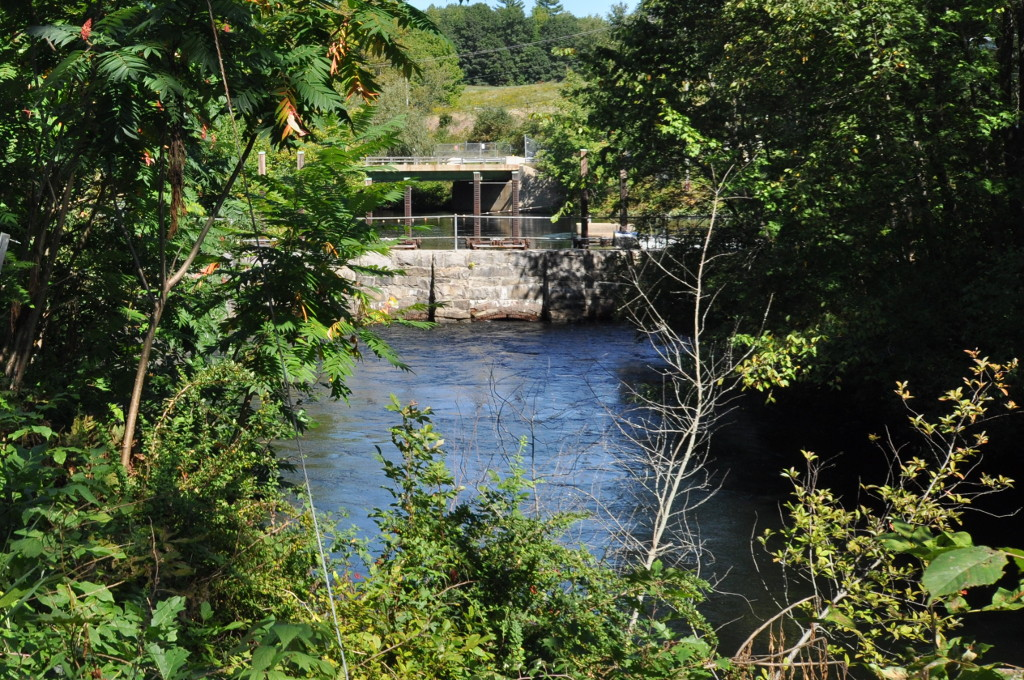
- A canal section in Windham

- Location within Maine Location within the United States
- Location: Cumberland County, Maine
- Coordinates: 43°44′0″N 70°25′30″W
- Area: 1,475 acres (597 ha)
- Built: 1827–1830
- NRHP reference No.: 74000317
- Added to NRHP: November 1, 1974

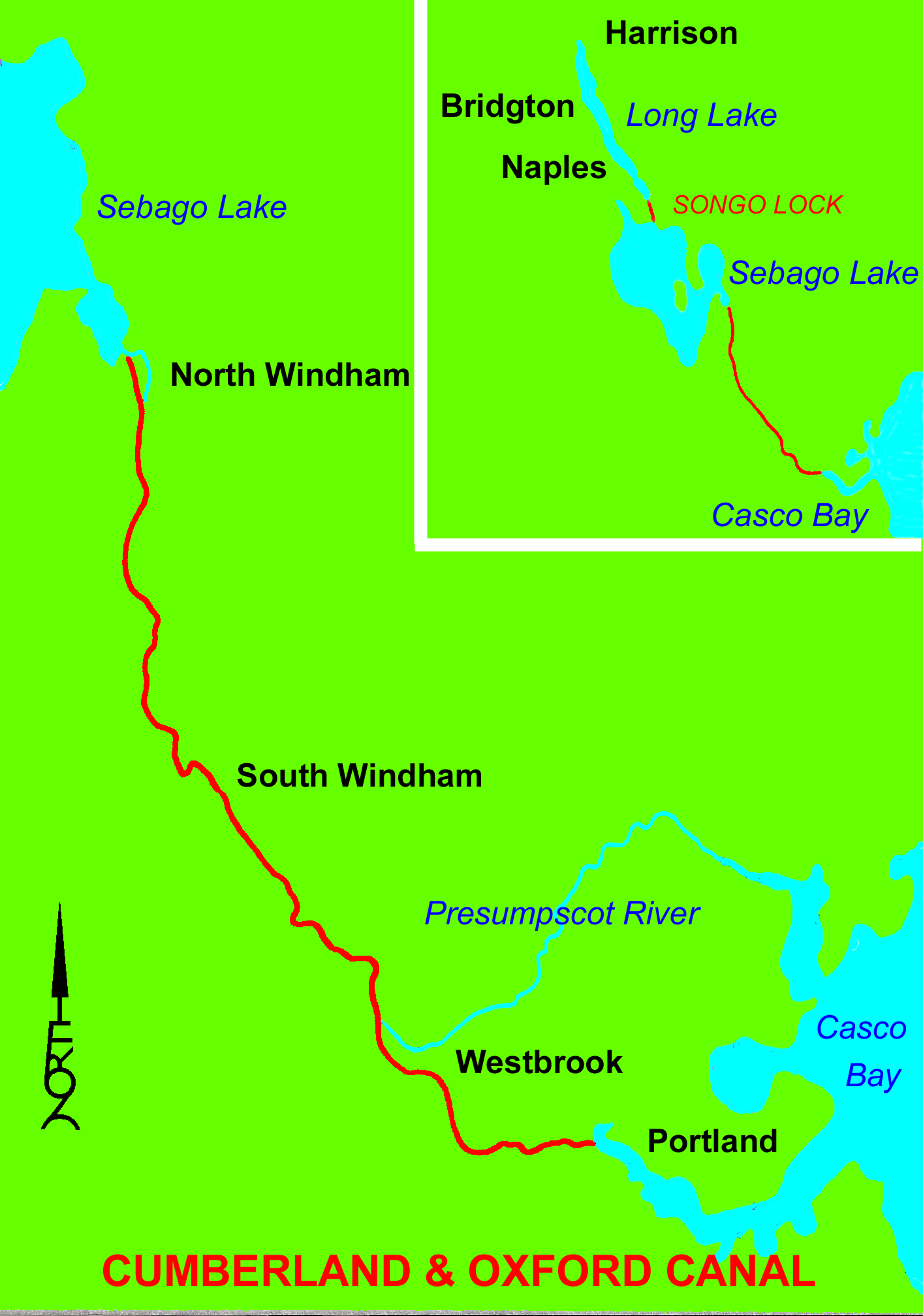
Map of canal with inset showing Long Lake, Songo Lock, and Sebago Lake

The Cumberland and Oxford Canal opened on June, 1830, to connect the largest lakes of southern Maine, United States, with the seaport of Portland. The canal followed the Presumpscot River from Sebago Lake through the towns of Standish, Windham, Gorham and Westbrook. The Canal diverged from the river at Westbrook to reach the navigable Fore River estuary and Portland Harbor. The canal required 27 locks to reach Sebago Lake at an elevation of 267 feet (81 m) above sea level. One additional lock was constructed in the Songo River to provide 5 feet (1.5 m) of additional elevation to reach Long Lake from Sebago Lake. Total navigable distance was approximately 38 miles (61 km) from Portland to Harrison, at the northern end of Long Lake. A proposed extension from Harrison to Bear Pond and Tom Pond in Waterford would have required three more locks on the Bear River, but they were never built.

A state lottery was authorized to help raise $50,000 for the project, and the Canal Bank of Portland was chartered in 1825. The canal was completed in 1830 at a cost of $206,000. The excavated portions of the canal had a surface width of 30 feet (9.1 m) with a 10 feet (3.0 m) wide channel 3.5 feet (1.1 m) deep. The locks were 10 feet (3.0 m) wide and 80 feet (24 m) long. Lock walls were made of granite masonry with wooden gates at either end. A lockkeeper was stationed at each lock to move the lock gates with heavy timber balance beams, manipulate iron valves to adjust water levels within the lock and collect a fee of six cents for use of the lock.

== Canal boats ==
The flat-bottomed canal boats had blunt bows, square sterns and a loaded draft of 3 feet (0.91 m). A tow path adjacent to the excavated portions of the canal enabled horses to tow the canal boats while the boatmen steered, or the boats could be moved by poles when the need arose; usually while passing through the Songo lock. Canal boats using the lakes had a hinged centerboard keel and two hinged masts capable of supporting gaff rigged sails which would be folded down for passage under bridges through the excavated canal. Cargos included lumber, masts, barrel hoops and staves, boxmaking shook and firewood from the interior to Portland. Apples were an important agricultural product of the area; and Oriental Powder Company mills adjacent to the canal in Windham manufactured nearly 25% of the Union gunpowder supply for the American Civil War. Canal boat passengers were charged one-half cent per mile. A wide variety of manufactured goods moved inland through the canal from Portland. The south end of Long Lake is locally known as Brandy Pond because a barrel of brandy was lost from a canal boat during passage through that part of the waterway.

== Railroads and Steamboats ==
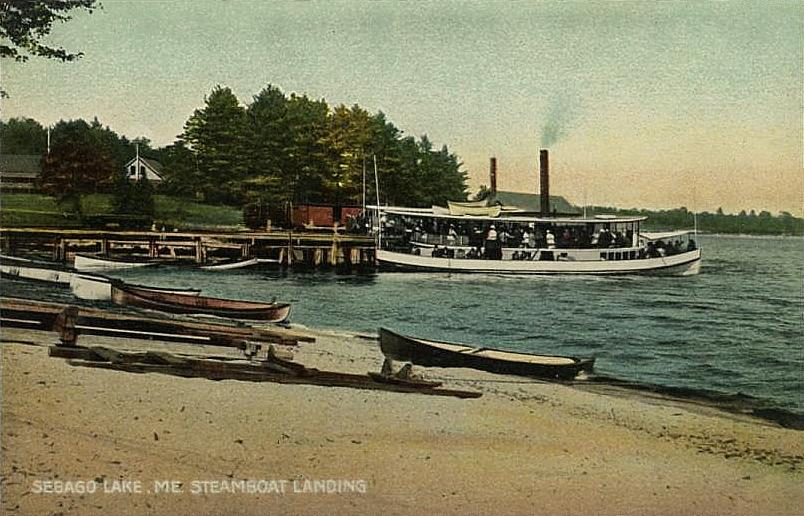
A steamboat of the type using the canal between Sebago Lake and Long Lake about 1910

Freight to and from Oxford County began moving over the Atlantic & St Lawrence Railroad in the 1850s and the 18-mile (29 km) long Presumpscot River portion of the canal fell into disuse when the Portland and Ogdensburg Railroad reached Sebago Lake Station in 1870. Some of the Presumpscot River lock facilities were converted to dams for the S. D. Warren Paper Mill. Steamboats continued to use Songo Lock to provide transportation from Sebago Lake Station to the lakeside communities of Bridgton, Harrison, Naples, Sebago, Casco, Raymond and North Windham. The Bridgton and Saco River Railroad reached Bridgton in 1883 and Harrison in 1898. The Sebago Lake, Songo River and Bay of Naples Steamboat Company continued to offer summer passenger service to tourists until the last steamboat Goodrich burned at its Naples dock in 1932. Songo Lock remains in service for pleasure boats.

Relicensing of the dams was the subject of the 2006 Supreme Court case S. D. Warren Co. v. Maine Board of Environmental Protection.

== See also ==
- National Register of Historic Places listings in Cumberland County, Maine
- Fore River Sanctuary
