= Augustus Bove =

American politician

Augustus F. Bove (died October 7, 1967) was an American politician from Maine. A Republican from Naples, Maine, Bove served two non-consecutive terms in the Maine House of Representatives (1929–30 and 1947–1948). In 1931, "AN ACT to Authorize the Construction of a Wharf in Long Lake at Naples." was passed by the Maine Legislature which allowed Bove to construct a wharf on Long Lake.
