= Geology of Maine =

The geology of Maine is part of the broader geology of New England and eastern North America.

== Geologic history ==
Maine's geologic past is unknown prior to 650 million years ago, although some geologists have suggested that rocks over a billion years old may be present in units of the Chain Lakes in northwestern Maine. The state is made up of three distinct terranes, including Laurentia, Iapetus Ocean terranes and the former microcontinent of Avalonia.

With the breakup of the supercontinent Pannotia beginning 600 million years ago, the new continent of Laurentia—Proto-North America—began shedding eroded material out into the newly formed Iapetus Ocean. The region experienced limestone and marine sediment deposition, in connection with the erosion of a neighboring microcontinent. The region that is now northern Penobscot Bay, which then belonged to the microcontinent Avalonia, experienced an episode of pegmatite intrusion and metamorphism around 650 million years ago.

Throughout the early Paleozoic, from the Cambrian into the early Ordovician, Laurentia experienced limestone and shale deposition at its continental margin from a position near the equator. On the Iapetus terranes, a mix of sediment deposition and volcanism took place during the early Cambrian, after which a proposed microplate collision launched the Penobscottian mountain building event. This period of metamorphism and deformation is preserved in rocks in northwest and north-central Maine. The early Ordovician marked a return to sedimentation and volcanism on the Iapetus terranes. Simultaneously, while Avalonia was situated in the Southern Hemisphere, it experienced much less limestone formation, although it also experienced sedimentation and volcanism throughout the Cambrian that is now preserved in rocks near Penobscot Bay.

Beginning in the middle Ordovician, the offshore Iapetus terranes collided with Laurentia, launching the Taconic Orogeny mountain building event, which included uplift, deformation and igneous activity. Portions of the island arcs of the Iapetus terranes are preserved in the Boundary Mountains. Avalonia continued to experience sedimentation and volcanism and the intrusion of granite bodies in the Silurian, now found along the central coast of Maine. Avalonia and Laurentia collided in the early Devonian. The collision started the Acadian orogeny, a major mountain building event. As a result of the collision, sediments in what is today northern Maine were buried to a depth of nine miles and underwent metamorphism. The collision also brought about the formation of the northern Appalachian Mountains, numerous faults and widespread igneous activity. At the time the new composite continent was positioned south of the equator.

During the Carboniferous the intrusion of Sebago granite took place. Slight remnants of sandstone and other sedimentary rocks deposited during this period remain along the coast of Maine. The Carboniferous marked the end of regional deformation and metamorphism. During the Permian, North America shifted north of the equator while Maine experienced uplift and erosion, exposing deeper rocks.

The breakup of Pangaea during the early Mesozoic was marked with new faulting of bedrock in Maine and the intrusion of basalt dikes on southwest coast of Maine. Limited igneous activity continued into the late Mesozoic. During the Cenozoic, uplift and erosion continued in the northern Appalachians. Maine became extensively glaciated during the Pleistocene. Extensive erosion altered much of the region's surface while the ice weighted down the continental crust. The release of stress and the slow rebound of the land surface since the end of the Pleistocene has generated new uplift, fractures and erosion. Humans arrived in Maine beginning in the early Holocene and human activity has played an increasing role in the surficial geology of the region since the start of European colonization and statehood.

== Physical geography ==
The northeast coast of Maine belongs to the Coastal Volcanic Belt, which extends into New Brunswick, while most of the state lies in the Central Maine Basin up to the Boundary Mountains in north-central Maine. North of the mountains the Connecticut Valley Basin stretches from Vermont into Quebec.

== Bedrock geology ==
A belt of Ordovician-Silurian rocks extends from Kittery to northeast of Bangor, with sandstone and slate in the east and gneiss and schist in the southwest. From southwest of Augusta to just south of Houlton, extending to the Canadian border are Silurian rocks, also found in a small area near Machias along the coast and in smaller areas further north. The Silurian rocks trend from marine shale in the north to gneiss and schist in the south west. A large area of the state, in a narrow belt from the New Hampshire line widening around Greenville and Millinocket and extending across much of northern Maine to Fort Kent is Devonian rock, including shale and sandstone in the north and gneiss and schist in the southwest.

Northwest York County is Silurian-Devonian bedrock, with marine slate sandstone and slate in the east, grading to schist closer to New Hampshire. A small area of igneous syenite intrusions is also found in York County on the coast, northeast of Kittery. Parts of Oxford, Penobscot, Hancock, Piscataquis and other counties have Devonian age gabbro, slate, granite and granodiorite. Very small pockets of unmetamorphosed conglomerate and sandstone dating to the Devonian and Carboniferous are found slightly to the west of Presque Isle and northwest of Eastport. Franklin and western Somerset County contain Precambrian and Ordovician gneiss, breccia, limestone, marble, sandstone, slate, syenite and diorite. Mt. Desert Island, Calais and portions of Downeast Maine and the Mid-Coast are Silurian granite and gabbro.

Among metamorphosed rocks, central and northern Maine display decreasing levels of metamorphism further north. A belt of highly metamorphosed rocks extends from just of north of Casco Bay through Androscoggin and Oxford counties.

== Surficial geology and soils ==
Soils are a part of the surficial geology of Maine, but are often considered and studied separately because of their role in construction and agriculture. Maine soils have formed since the retreat of the last ice sheet from the region 12,500 years before the present. Much of Oxford County and parts of Cumberland, York and Androscoggin County have loam soils, derived from granite, gneiss and schist with an average depth to bedrock of 5 feet, underlain by sandy till with a groundwater 30 inches below the surface in winter. Riverbeds in central and northeast Maine are lined with sandy glacial outwash made up of gneiss, limestone, phyllite, shale and granite. Much of coastal Maine has clay-loam soils from marine and lake sediments, with a water table at the surface or 12 inches below it and poor drainage throughout the year.

Much of northern Maine has poorly drained loam soils, basal till, with material derived from schist, phyllite slate and metastone. Similar soils are found across an additional 23% of Maine. Surface stones and boulders are common throughout most of Maine. Much of greater Portland, greater Augusta and coastal and river channels of southwest Maine feature clay-loam soils or sandy soils, with very few boulders and surface rocks.

== Hydrogeology and water resources ==
The hydrogeology and water resources of Maine are closely related to the state's surficial geology, soils, climate, land use and environment. The Maine Geological Survey began a continuing process of mapping sand and gravel aquifers beginning in 1978. Statewide, Maine receives an annual rainfall total of 42 inches or 24 trillion gallons. Up to 50% of rainfall runs off the landscape in rivers and streams, while an additional 30–40% evaporates or is transpired through vegetation. Between 10% and 20% of precipitation (including rain and snow melt) recharges groundwater. Because of the state's rural and small town settlement pattern 40% of residents use private groundwater wells for household water.

Maine has extensive sand and gravel aquifers formed in sediments left behind after the last glaciation. Northwestern Maine is currently unmapped for these aquifers. Deeper, bedrock aquifers formed within cracks in the state's igneous and metamorphic basement rock are also present. For drilled wells, the average borehole depth is 250 feet. Groundwater is recharged in the springtime with rain and snow melt, but drops throughout the summer. Saltwater intrusion is a growing problem in heavily populated coastal locations.

== Mining in Maine ==
In the 21st century, granite quarries and gravel pits continue to contribute to the economy of Maine. However, mining has a long history in the state, stretching back to the early 19th century. The Lubec Lead Mine was an early mine operating in the 1830s. Maine's first State Geologist, Charles T. Jackson, sketched a diagram of the site's limestone, greenstone trap-rock and veins of galena during an 1837 visit. The site is still open for amateur mineral collecting, although the State of Maine advises extreme caution as a result of potential flooding from high tides.

In surficial, udic soils, Maine had an extensive bog iron extraction industry in the 1800s, including smelters such as the Katahdin Iron Works, which operated in the 1840s. One of sixteen brick kilns for producing charcoal to smelt the iron remains at the site. Maine experienced a boom in metal mining between 1879 and 1882, centered in Lubec, Acton, Blue Hill and Sullivan. A dedicated publication, the Maine Mining Journal was published starting in 1880. Although the boom was partially an economic bubble, some mines such as the Douglass Copper Mine in Blue Hill produced viable quantities of copper and continued to do so until 1918 under the control of the American Smelting and Mining Company. High silver prices drove a short period of silver mining in Cherryfield between 1905 and 1907, but after 1890 little significant metal mining took place. Manganese ore, discovered in the 1840s, was extracted during World War II in Aroostook County for the US war effort.

Harborside Copper Mine in Brooksville first opened in the 1880s, but was acquired and reopened by Callahan Mining Corporation from New York in 1965. The company got permission from the state to drain the Goose Pond tidal inlet and opened an open pit copper mine that operated until reserves were depleted in 1972. The mine was equipped with a flotation mill and shipped zinc to Pennsylvania and copper to Quebec for smelting. A larger zinc, copper and lead mine was operated by Kerramerican next to Second Pond in Blue Hill. State Geologist John S. Cummings discovered a 35 million ton massive copper-zinc sulfide deposit in Aroostook County, estimated to be the third largest find in the US, in September, 1977, but the deposit has not been developed. The deposit stretches across 130 miles, between 50 and 60 miles in northern Maine. Historically, Rockport supported large limestone kilns to supply the East Coast cement industry and North Paris had a feldspar plant until 1988. The Central Maine Slate Belt from Waterville to Brownville was a site of widespread slate mining into the early 20th century.

Small scale slate mining continues in Monson and a small clay pit supplies the Morin Brick Company in Auburn. Between the 1940s and 1980s, Maine also had a small peat industry in Penobscot, Sullivan, Deblois, Franklin, Friendship and Centerville. Significant quantities of aggregate are extracted from locations such as the Whitefield and Topsham gravel pits, Blue Rock quarry as well as the large Dragon Cement plant in Thomaston. Deer Isle granite is still quarried in Stonington, 80 years after the Great Depression and the widespread adoption of concrete hobbled the Maine granite industry.

== See also ==
- List of fossiliferous stratigraphic units in Maine
- Paleontology in Maine
