= Bell Hill Meetinghouse =

Historic church in Maine, United States

- U.S. National Register of Historic Places
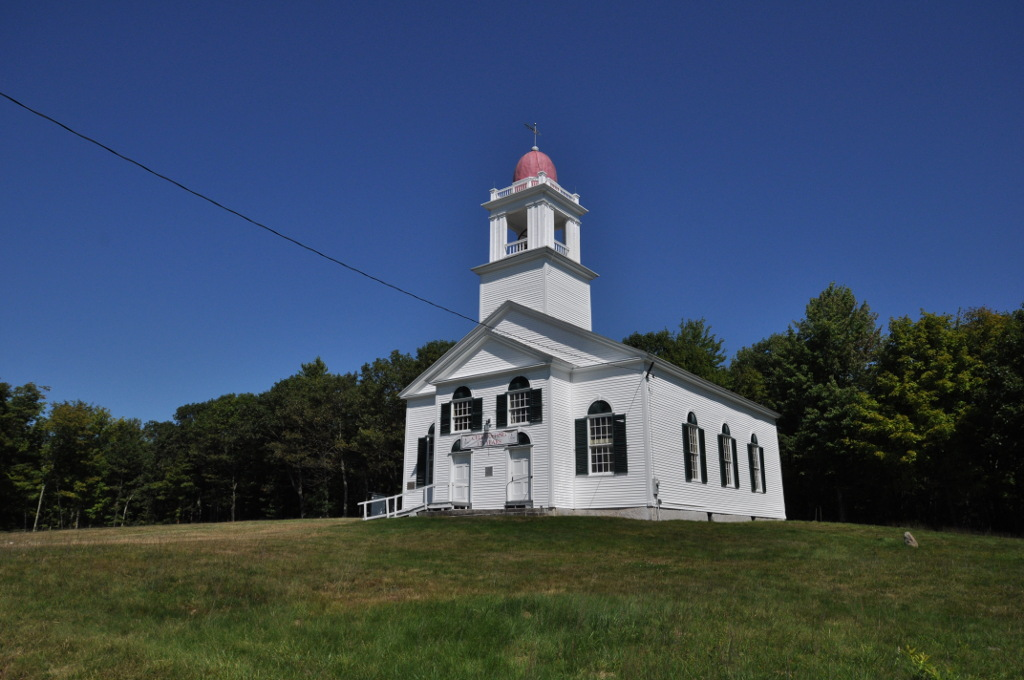

- Location within Maine Location within the United States
- Location: 191 Bell Hill Rd., Otisfield, Maine
- Coordinates: 44°5′17″N 70°33′36″W
- Area: 1 acre (0.40 ha)
- Built: 1839
- Architect: Nutting, Nathan Jr.
- Architectural style: Federal, Greek Revival
- NRHP reference No.: 03000620
- Added to NRHP: July 10, 2003

The Bell Hill Meetinghouse is a historic church building located at 191 Bell Hill Road in Otisfield, Maine. The building was the work of local master builder Nathan Nutting Jr. (1804-1867), having since remained a significant example of transitional Federal-Greek Revival architecture. It was listed on the National Register of Historic Places in 2003 to ensure its preservation.

== Description and history ==
The Bell Hill Meetinghouse is located at the top of Bell Hill in Otisfield, Maine, on the east side of Bell Hill Road. It is a single story rectangular wood-frame structure, with a projecting center bay on the main (west-facing) facade, and a square bell tower that rises from the central ridge near the western end of the gable roof. The projecting bay has two entry doors, each topped by a louvered fan, with small square sash windows above each, also topped by louvered fans. The bay, like the main facade, has a fully enclosed triangular pediment. The central bay is flanked by tall twelve-over-twelve windows, also topped by louvered fans. These windows are matched by those that line the long sides (north and south) of the building. All windows have wooden shutters, and the building is clad in vinyl siding, although its original trim has been carefully preserved.

The tower's first stage is square, with no significant decoration. Above this is an open section with square posts at the corners which are decorated with paired pilasters. A low balcony railing stands between the posts on all four sides, and the church bell hangs in the opening. The posts support an entablature and an ogeed cornice. Above this is a dome which is surrounded by a low, narrow balustrade set between small columns at the corners. The dome is topped by a copper spire.

The meetinghouse was built in 1838-39 by Nathan Nutting, Jr., a local resident who was raised on the family farm, but received training in woodwork in Boston, Massachusetts, before returning to Otisfield. Most of his work in the area was residential, the most notable being the family home, built in 1824. In the 1830s he received commissions to build churches in at least six area communities. This church was built to replace the town's 18th-century meetinghouse, which had been severely damaged by wind and rain. It is possible that this damage prompted the town to request Nutting's rapid construction of this building, using a plan he had previously used to build a church in Waterford.

The church was used regularly for services until about 1887, and was revived for annual services in 1913. The building is now owned by the Bell Hill Meetinghouse Association, and is used for occasional services and functions such as weddings.

== See also ==
- National Register of Historic Places listings in Oxford County, Maine
