= Point Sebago Resort =

Coordinates: 43°55′55″N 70°33′10″W

Point Sebago
- Interactive map of the Point Sebago area

General information
- Status: Completed
- Location: 261 Point Sebago Road, Casco, Maine, United States
- Opened: 1970; 56 years ago
- Owner: Cove Communities

Technical details
- Grounds: 775 acres (3 km^{2})

Other information
- Number of restaurants: 1
- Number of bars: 1
- Facilities: 18-hole golf course, sandy beach, marina, lounges, outdoor sports center

Website
- www.pointsebago.com

Point Sebago Resort is located in the Town of Casco, on the north shore of Sebago Lake, southern Maine's largest lake. Point Sebago opened in 1970 as a campground suitable for tents and trailers. Today the 775-acre (3 km^{2}) resort has over 250 park homes on and around Sebago Lake, resort cottages and vacation homes on and around the 18-hole championship golf course. The Resort offers free supervised children's activities program, family and adult activities to resort guests, and a curated entertainment program. Sebago Lake State Park lies to its west.

The resort was started in 1970 by Larry Gould, who lived on the shore of the lake from 2008 until his death from a long-standing illness on February 13, 2015. The resort is now owned by Cove Communities based in Phoenix, Arizona.
