= Major Knight =

American politician

Major W. Knight (March 17, 1812 – 1891) was an American politician from Maine. He served one term in the Maine House of Representatives in 1880 as a member of the Greenback Party. He lived in and represented Naples, Maine.
