= Sebago to the Sea Trail =

Coordinates: 43.763°N 70.517°W

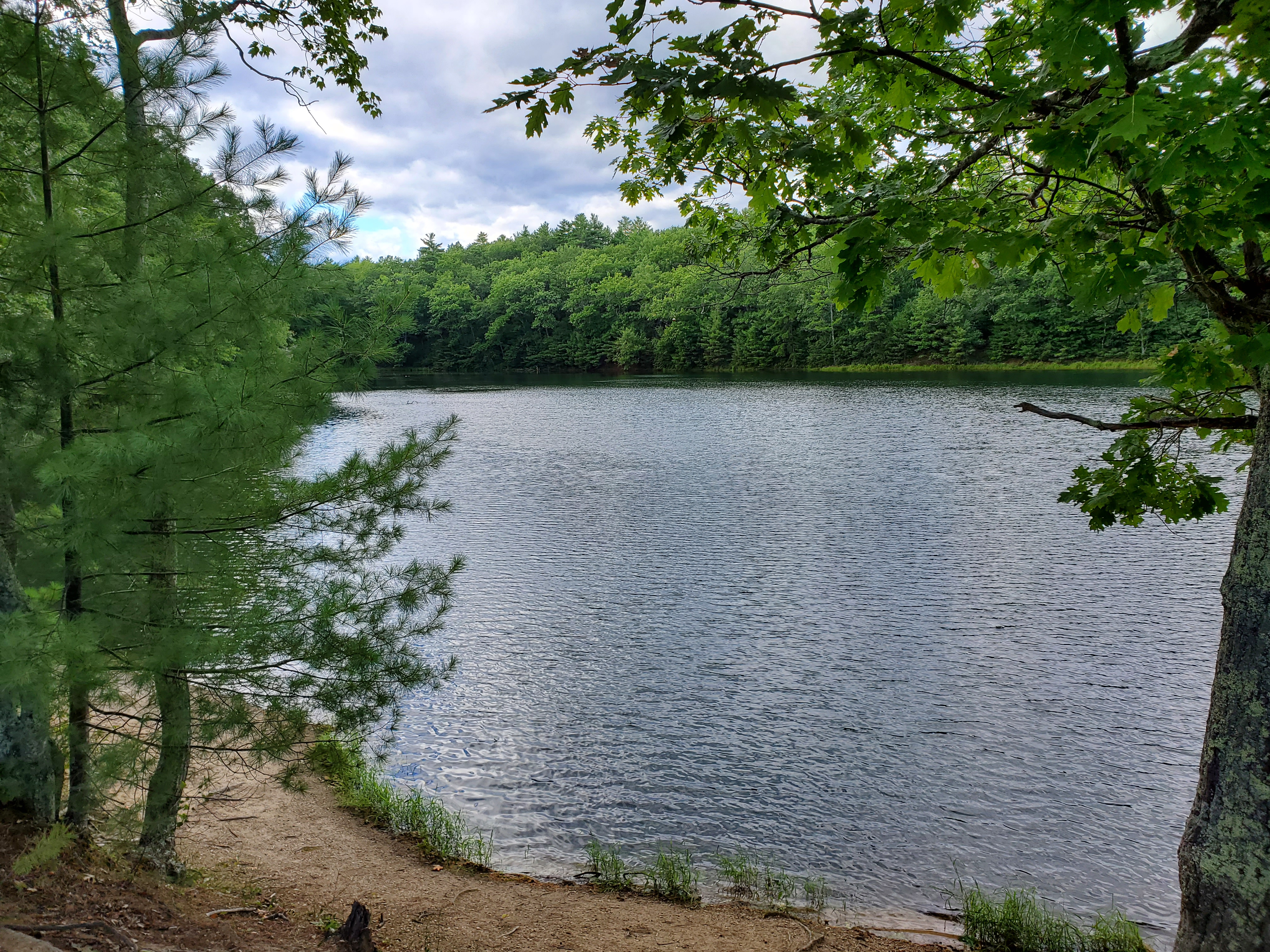
View of Otter Ponds from the trail

Sebago to the Sea Trail is a trail that goes from Sebago Lake to the Gulf of Maine. Work on the trail begin in 2007, with a goal of creating an eventual 28 mile trail to the sea. A significant portion is made of the former Maine Central Railroad Mountain Division. The trail begins at Sebago Lake in the town of Standish, and runs through Gorham, Windham, Westbrook, and Falmouth, reaching the sea in Portland.
