= Horace A. Barrows =

American physician

Horace A. Barrows (August 8, 1809 – June 7, 1852) was an American physician who practiced in Western Maine in the early 19th century, made and sold plant-based medicines, prescribed a vegetarian diet and invested in local businesses.

== Biography ==
He was born in Hebron, Massachusetts (it became part of Maine in 1820). He married Irene Bearce in 1832. The couple had two adopted children.

Barrows practiced medicine in Phillips, Maine, Harrison, Maine and Otisfield, Maine. The Portland Press Herald in 2020 published a photo of the house Barrows lived in. The photo was taken in 1894, after his death in 1852.

Barrows' diaries are in the collection of the Maine Historical Society.

== Scribner's Mills ==
In the 1840s, Barrows and his brother invested in the building of the Barrows-Scribner's Mills sawmill and Scribner Homestead at Carsley's Rips on the Crooked River in Bolsters Mills in Harrison.

The mill complex, a small collection of wood-frame buildings (now partially rebuilt after suffering extensive weather-related damage), was established in the late 1840s by Barrows. The exact construction date of the house is not known, but it appears to have been between 1849 and 1851, when Barrows sold the property, with house, to Elijah Scribner. Barrows' diary mentions the mill enterprise in 1846 and 1847.

In 1984, the Scribner descendants sold the mill to Scribner's Mill Preservation, Inc. and it is being restored and run as an 1847 sawmill museum.

In 1976, the mill had been listed in the National Register of Historic Places, but was removed in 1986 after portions of the structure had collapsed or were dismantled.

== Vegetarian diet ==
Dr. William Alcott's 1838 book "Vegetable Diet" includes two letters from Barrows describing his positive experiences with a vegetarian diet:

Dear Sir, – I have a brother-in-law, who owes his life to abstinence from animal food, and strict adherence to the simplest vegetable diet. My own existence is prolonged, only (according to human probabilities) by entire abstinence from flesh-meat of every description, and feeding principally upon the farinacea [an archaic term for grains and vegetables]. Numberless other instances have come under my observation within the last three years, in which a strict adherence to a simple vegetable diet has done for the wretched invalids what the best medical treatment had utterly failed to do.

In the second letter he wrote that his meals were "wheat meal bread, potatoes, butter, and baked apples" and he always drank "cold water." Barrows also made his own Graham bread.

== Proprietary medicines ==
Barrows made plant-based medicines that were sold across Maine. Medicines he made and sold were called Best Family Physic, Syrian Balm of Life, and Political Ointment.
