= Songo River Queen II =

Coordinates: 43°58′12″N 70°36′08″W

History
- Name: Songo River Queen II
- Port of registry: United States
- Route: Long Lake, ME; (Songo River, ME until 2011)
- Launched: 1982

General characteristics
- Tonnage: 100 tons
- Length: 93 ft (28 m)
- Beam: 23 ft (7.0 m)
- Capacity: Up to 350 passengers

The Songo River Queen II is a diesel-powered stern paddle-wheeler, built as a replica of the steam-powered vessels that traveled the Mississippi River and can hold up to 300 people. The paddlewheeler is known for becoming landlocked in Long Lake in September 2011, after a 20-year career on the Songo River, due to the construction of a fixed bridge on Naples Causeway.

== History ==
The Songo River Queen II, which was christened on Memorial Day weekend of 1982, is the successor to the Songo River Queen, which burned in a midnight fire on Columbus Day weekend in 1981. The current vessel is located at the Route 302 Causeway in Naples, Maine.

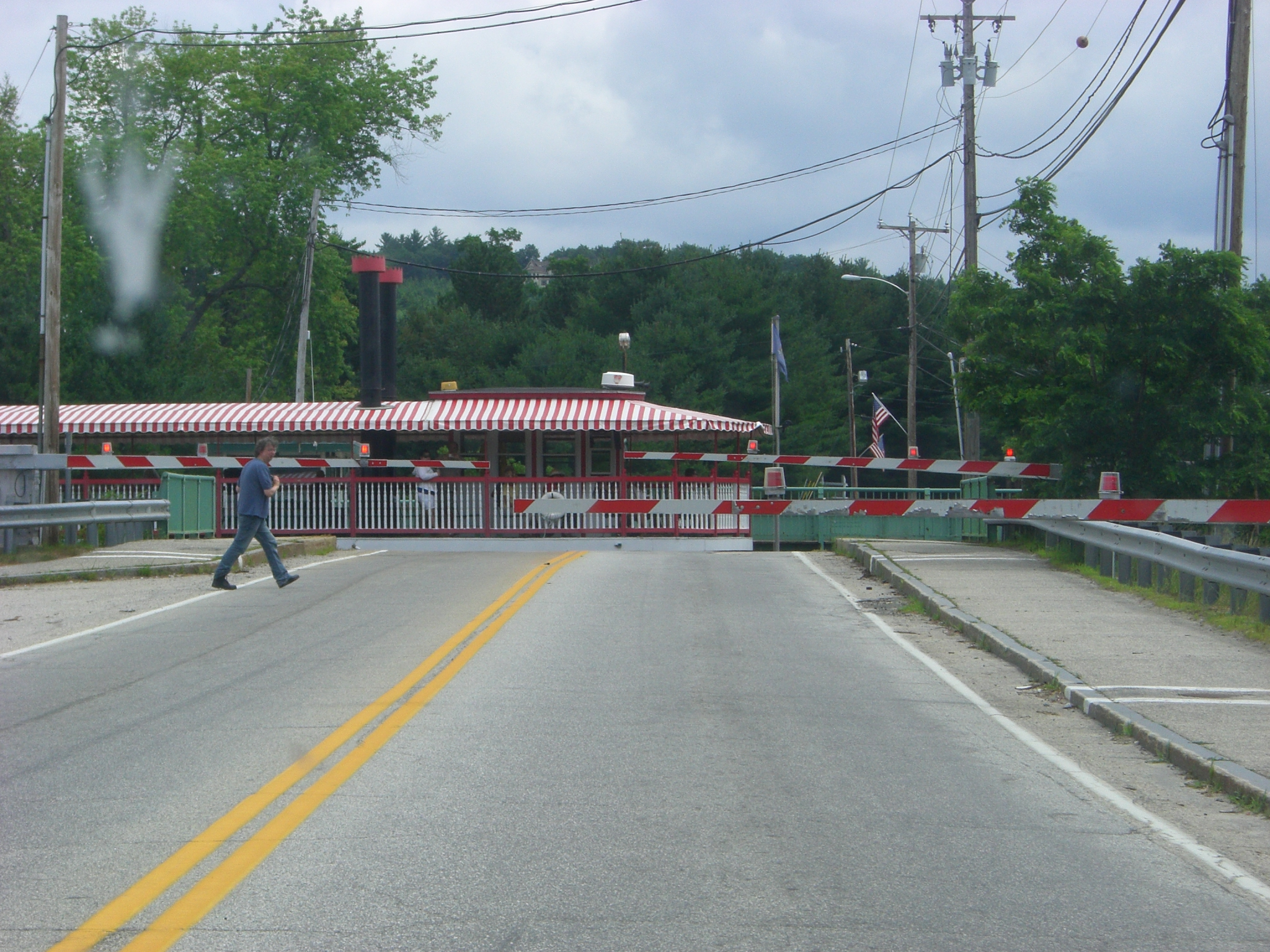
The Songo River Queen II passing through the old swing bridge on the Naples Causeway in 2010, before the bridge was replaced by a fixed-span bridge

Both the original Songo River Queen and the Songo River Queen II were built by Frank C. Gerrish Jr. The Queen has been an annual summer attraction on the Naples Causeway since 1970, making daily excursions on Long Lake as well as through the swing bridge onto Brandy Pond and through the twists and turns of the Songo River into the hand-operated Songo Locks.
