= Chester Burnham =

American politician

Chester L. Burnham (February 26, 1908 - June 10, 1978) was an American politician from Maine. A Democrat from Naples, Maine, Burnham served 3 terms (1964-1970) in the Maine House of Representatives. He also served for 30 years on the Naples Board of Selectmen as well as working a general contractor with Burnam Brothers. He died on June 10, 1978, in a Portland hospital.
