= Coastal Volcanic Belt =

The Coastal Volcanic Belt is a major Late Silurian volcanic belt extending from Massachusetts, United States, into southwestern New Brunswick, Canada. It is one of the largest bimodal volcanic provinces in the world, ranging in composition from basalts to rhyolites.

== See also ==
- Volcanism of Canada
- Volcanism of Eastern Canada
