= Naples, Maine =

Town in the United States

- Town
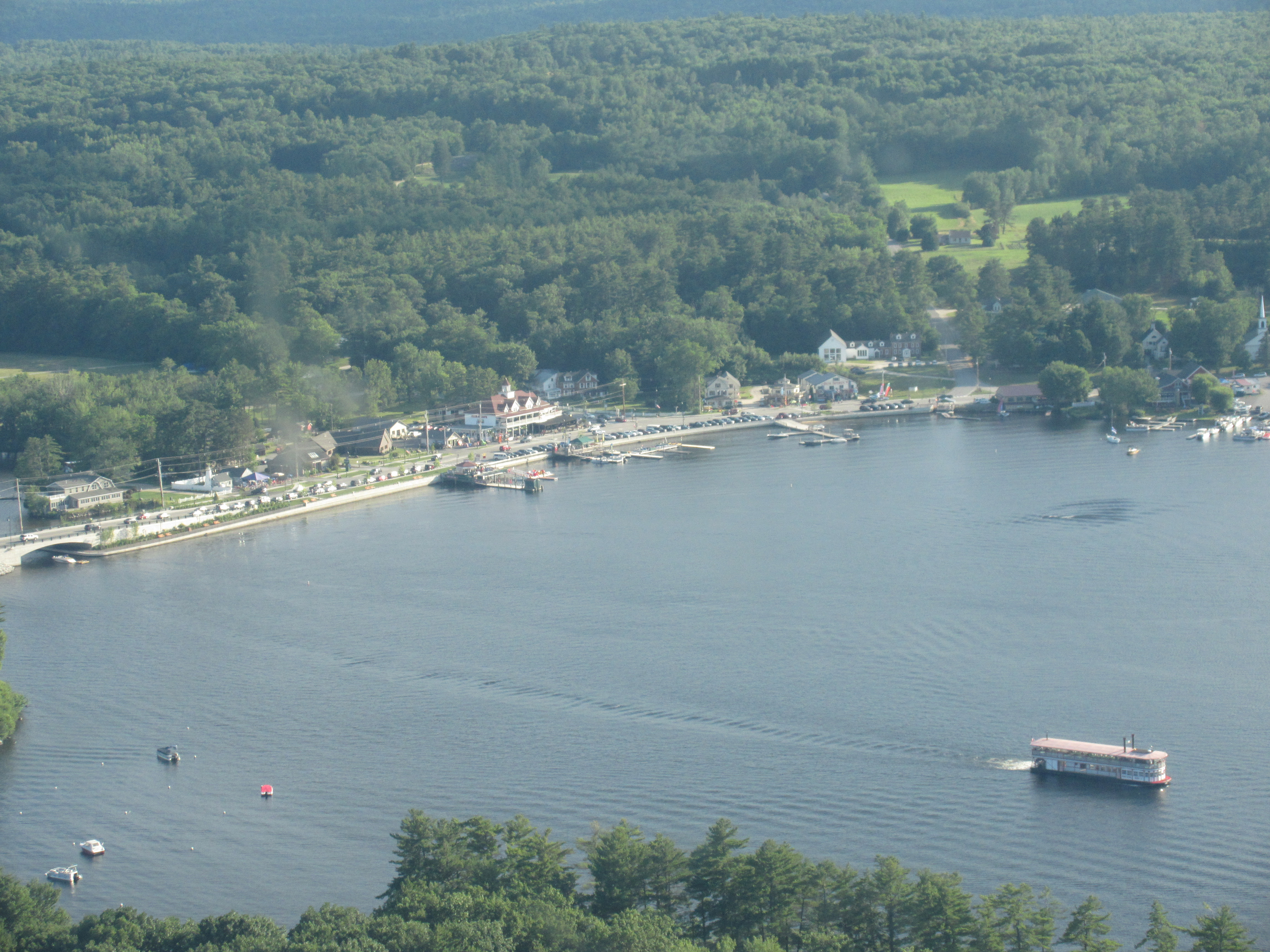
- Naples from the air, with the Songo River Queen II on Long Lake and the newly-constructed causeway connecting Brandy Pond

- Seal
- Nickname: "The Heart of the Lakes Region"
- Motto: "Welcome to Vacationland"
- Location in Cumberland County and the state of Maine.
- Coordinates: 43°59′36″N 70°36′56″W
- Country: United States
- State: Maine
- County: Cumberland
- Villages: Naples; Edes Falls; South Naples

Area
  - Total: 37.25 sq mi (96.48 km^{2})
  - Land: 31.82 sq mi (82.41 km^{2})
  - Water: 5.43 sq mi (14.06 km^{2})
- Elevation: 367 ft (112 m)

Population (2020)
  - Total: 3,925
  - Density: 123/sq mi (47.6/km^{2})
- Time zone: UTC-5 (Eastern (EST))
  - Summer (DST): UTC-4 (EDT)
- ZIP code: 04055
- Area code: 207
- FIPS code: 23-48085
- GNIS feature ID: 582613
- Website: Town of Naples, Maine

Naples is a town in Cumberland County, Maine, United States. It is part of the Portland-South Portland-Biddeford metropolitan area. The population was 3,925 at the 2020 census, and it is home to part of Sebago Lake State Park. Naples is a resort area. Naples is included in the Lewiston-Auburn, Maine metropolitan New England City and Town Area

== History ==
The area was settled in 1774. Farming in Naples, Maine was limited by the soil, which consisted of gravelly loam, its surface strewn with glacial erratic boulders. The uplands, however, provided good grazing for livestock, and hay became the principal crop.

Named for Naples, Italy, the town was incorporated on March 4, 1834, from parts of Otisfield, Harrison, Raymond and Bridgton. Between 1845 and 1856, it annexed more land from Sebago, Otisfield and Bridgton. The Songo Lock, completed two years before town incorporation, linked Long Lake and Brandy Pond with Sebago Lake, allowing passage of boats from Harrison, Maine to Portland through the Cumberland and Oxford Canal in Standish. A canning factory and cooperage were established at Naples village. The community also produced carriages, men's and boy's clothing, boots and shoes.

The scenery of the lakes, however, would make tourism the dominant industry. Visitors in the 19th century included Henry Wadsworth Longfellow and Nathaniel Hawthorne. To accommodate his passengers, Charles L. Goodridge of the Sebago Lake, Songo River & Bay of Naples Steamship Company built a hostelry on a knoll at the southern end of Long Lake. On July 26, 1899, the Bay of Naples Inn opened with 80 bedrooms. It was designed by John Calvin Stevens, who reduced by two-fifths a plan originally created for the ill-fated Metallak Hotel in Colebrook, New Hampshire. While under construction, the Metallak was destroyed in April 1893 during a violent windstorm, and its investors abandoned the project. The Bay of Naples Inn, which faced Mount Washington and the east side of the White Mountains, was a popular resort during the early 20th century. Automobile tourists began arriving after designation of the Theodore Roosevelt International Highway in 1919 (identified as United States Route 302 since 1935). The Bay of Naples Inn remained open through the 1951 season, but in 1964 was deemed unprofitable and razed.

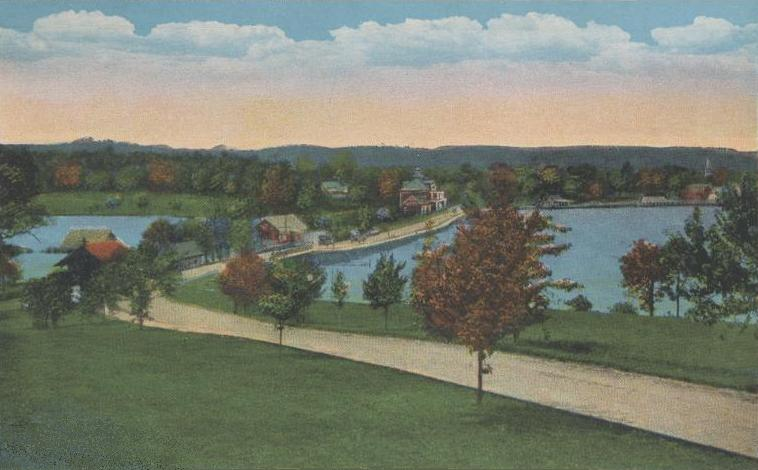
Naples village c. 1920

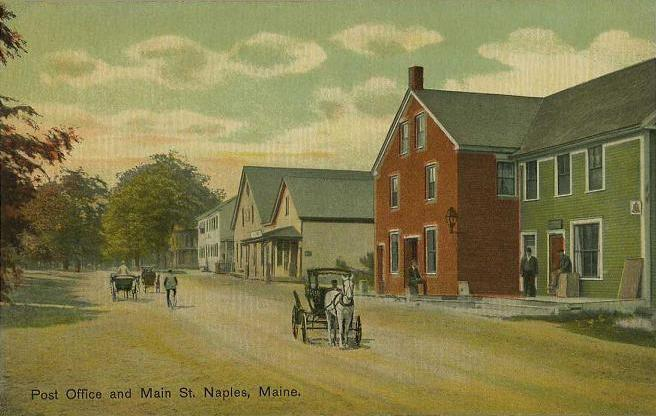
Post Office in c. 1910

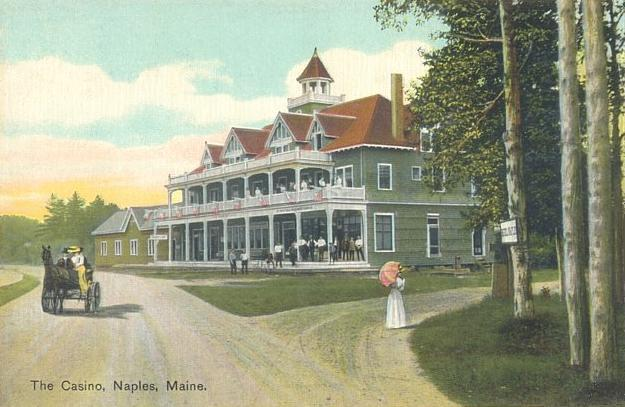
The Casino in 1911

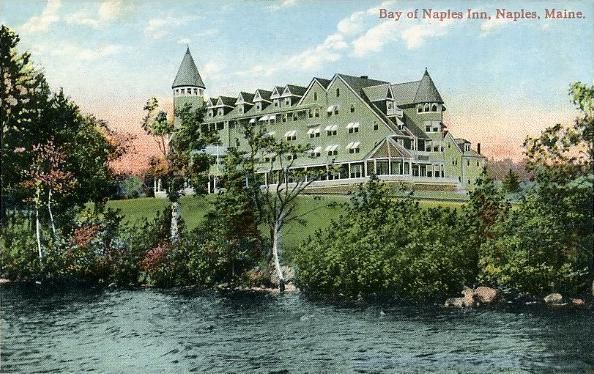
Bay of Naples Inn, 1913

== Geography ==
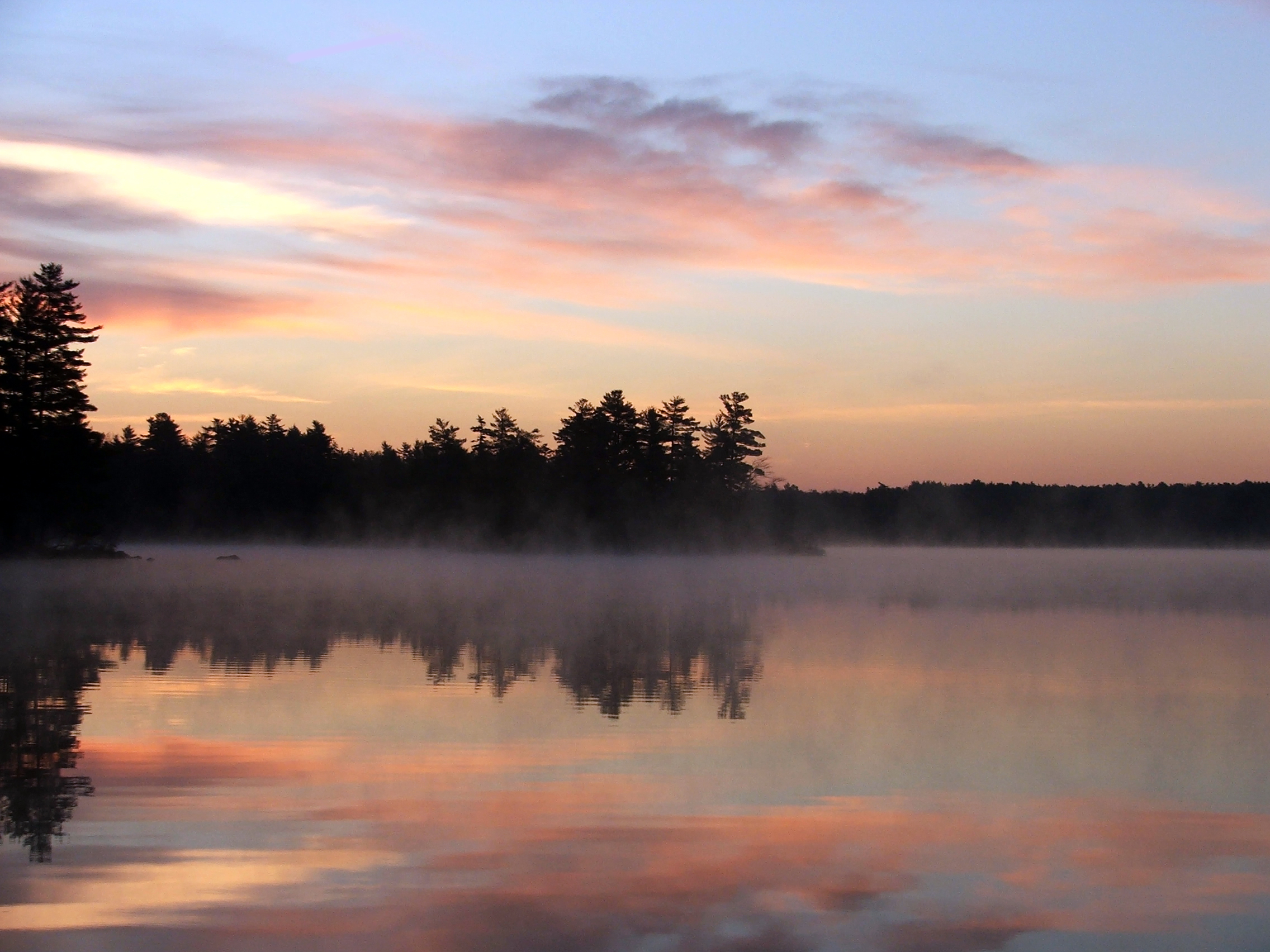
Trickey Pond in 2005

According to the United States Census Bureau, the town has a total area of 37.25 square miles (96.48 km^{2}), of which 31.82 square miles (82.41 km^{2}) is land and 5.43 square miles (14.06 km^{2}) is water. Naples is drained by the Songo River.

Water bodies that are adjacent to, or within Naples include:

- Sebago Lake
- Chute River
- Long Lake
- Brandy Pond
- Trickey Pond

== Demographics ==
Historical population
Census	Pop.	Note	%±
1840	758		—
1850	1,025		35.2%
1860	1,219		18.9%
1870	1,058		−13.2%
1880	1,007		−4.8%
1890	846		−16.0%
1900	813		−3.9%
1910	736		−9.5%
1920	514		−30.2%
1930	641		24.7%
1940	676		5.5%
1950	747		10.5%
1960	735		−1.6%
1970	956		30.1%
1980	1,833		91.7%
1990	2,860		56.0%
2000	3,274		14.5%
2010	3,872		18.3%
2020	3,925		1.4%
U.S. Decennial Census

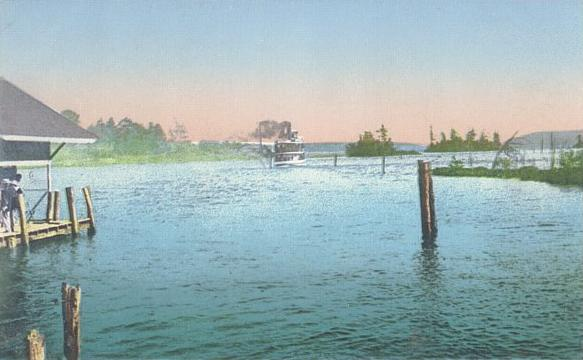
Steamboat c. 1910

=== 2010 census ===
As of the census of 2010, there were 3,872 people, 1,579 households, and 1,094 families living in the town. The population density was 121.7 inhabitants per square mile (47.0/km^{2}). There were 3,004 housing units at an average density of 94.4 per square mile (36.4/km^{2}). The racial makeup of the town was 97.4% White, 0.3% African American, 0.2% Native American, 0.5% Asian, 0.2% from other races, and 1.4% from two or more races. Hispanic or Latino of any race were 0.7% of the population.

There were 1,579 households, of which 30.4% had children under the age of 18 living with them, 53.8% were married couples living together, 10.6% had a female householder with no husband present, 4.9% had a male householder with no wife present, and 30.7% were non-families. 23.1% of all households were made up of individuals, and 6.6% had someone living alone who was 65 years of age or older. The average household size was 2.45 and the average family size was 2.83.

The median age in the town was 42.9 years. 22.2% of residents were under the age of 18; 6.8% were between the ages of 18 and 24; 24.4% were from 25 to 44; 33% were from 45 to 64; and 13.6% were 65 years of age or older. The gender makeup of the town was 51.2% male and 48.8% female.

=== 2000 census ===
As of the census of 2000, there were 3,274 people, 1,297 households, and 931 families living in the town. The population density was 102.9 inhabitants per square mile (39.7/km^{2}). There were 2,381 housing units at an average density of 74.9 per square mile (28.9/km^{2}). The racial makeup of the town was 98.20% White, 0.15% African American, 0.31% Native American, 0.31% Asian, 0.21% from other races, and 0.82% from two or more races. Hispanic or Latino of any race were 0.21% of the population.

There were 1,297 households, out of which 32.1% had children under the age of 18 living with them, 58.6% were married couples living together, 8.3% had a female householder with no husband present, and 28.2% were non-families. 21.7% of all households were made up of individuals, and 8.9% had someone living alone who was 65 years of age or older. The average household size was 2.52 and the average family size was 2.90.

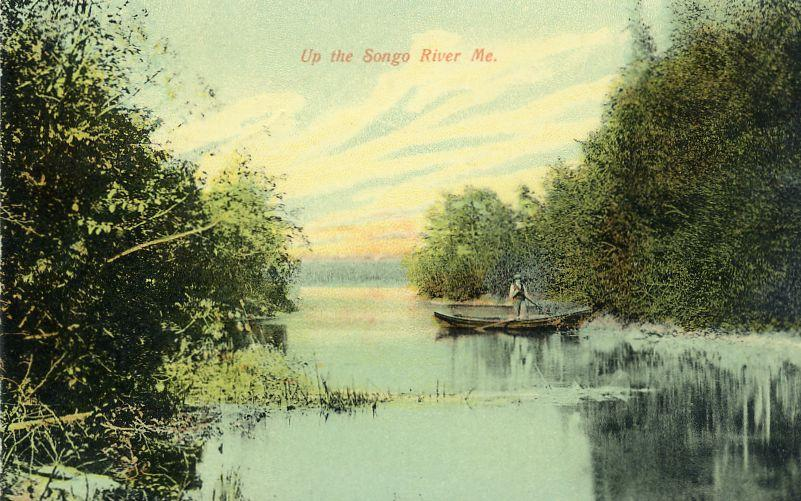
Songo River in 1908

In the town, the population was spread out, with 24.6% under the age of 18, 5.6% from 18 to 24, 29.8% from 25 to 44, 25.3% from 45 to 64, and 14.7% who were 65 years of age or older. The median age was 40 years. For every 100 females, there were 102.3 males. For every 100 females age 18 and over, there were 97.2 males.

The median income for a household in the town was $38,141, and the median income for a family was $40,825. Males had a median income of $31,458 versus $24,596 for females. The per capita income for the town was $18,176. About 6.9% of families and 7.6% of the population were below the poverty line, including 10.4% of those under age 18 and 2.3% of those age 65 or over.

== Arts and culture ==
=== Site of interest ===
- Naples Historical Society Museum

== Education ==
The town is home to the Lake Region High School.

== Notable people ==
- Augustus Bove, state legislator (Republican)
- Chester L. Burnham, state legislator (Democrat)
- Richard Cebra, state legislator (Republican)
- Major Knight, state legislator with the Greenback Party (1880)
- Daniel Merriam, watercolorist
- Richard Thompson, state legislator (Democrat)
- Mark Walker, state legislator (Republican)
