= Brandy Pond =

Lake in Naples, Maine, United States

- Location within Maine Location within the United States
- Location: Naples, Maine
- Coordinates: 43°57′20″N 70°35′26″W
- Type: mesotrophic
- Primary inflows: Chute River
- Primary outflows: Songo River
- Catchment area: 199 square miles (520 km^{2})
- Basin countries: United States
- Surface area: 740 acres (300 ha)
- Average depth: 14 feet (4.3 m)
- Max. depth: 44 feet (13 m)
- Water volume: 11,757 acre⋅ft (14,502,000 m^{3})
- Residence time: 34 days
- Shore length^{1}: 6.2 miles (10.0 km)
- Surface elevation: 268 feet (82 m)
- Settlements: Naples
- ^{1} Shore length is not a well-defined measure.

Brandy Pond, also known as Bay of Naples Lake, is a small lake in Naples, Maine, United States, that is connected to Long Lake by the Chute River. Brandy Pond is connected to Sebago Lake by the Songo River, which runs through Sebago Lake State Park. To get to Sebago Lake through the Songo River, one must pass through Songo Lock, one of the last remaining hand-operated locks in the country.

Brandy Pond is bounded by a commercial (downtown) area called the "causeway" on Rt. 302, an area of homes on the southerly side called Scenic Drive, a golf course on the northern side, as well as many private homes and public campgrounds and condominiums.

== See also ==
- Songo River Queen II
