= Songo River =

Coordinates: 43.91396°N 70.57534°W

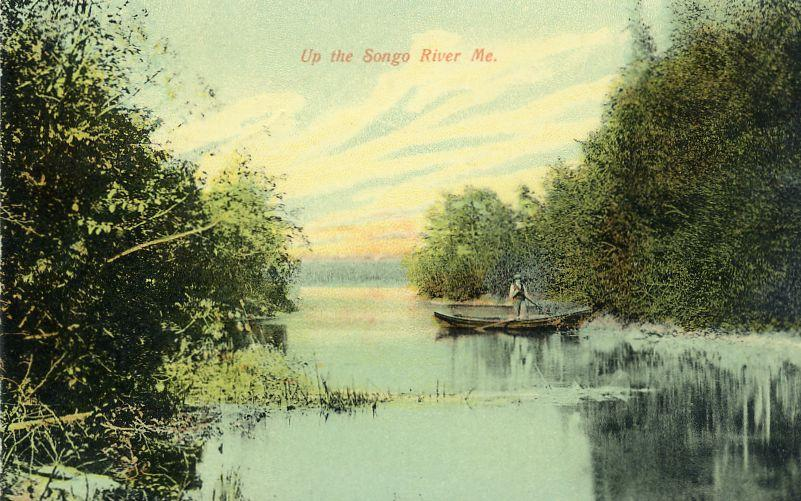

Location
- Country: United States

Physical characteristics
- Source
  - location: Maine
  - elevation: 268 ft (82 m)
- Mouth
  - location: Sebago Lake State Park
  - elevation: 267 ft (81 m)
- Basin size: 114 mi^{2} (300 km^{2})

The Songo River is a 3.1-mile-long (5.0 km) river in Maine. The river flows from Brandy Pond at the south end of Long Lake into Sebago Lake at Sebago Lake State Park. Songo Lock, the last remaining lock of the 19th-century Cumberland and Oxford Canal, controls the elevation of Long Lake and allows navigation of large boats between Long Lake and Sebago Lake.

== See also ==
- List of rivers of Maine
- Songo River Queen II
