= Sebago Lake State Park =

State park in Cumberland County, Maine

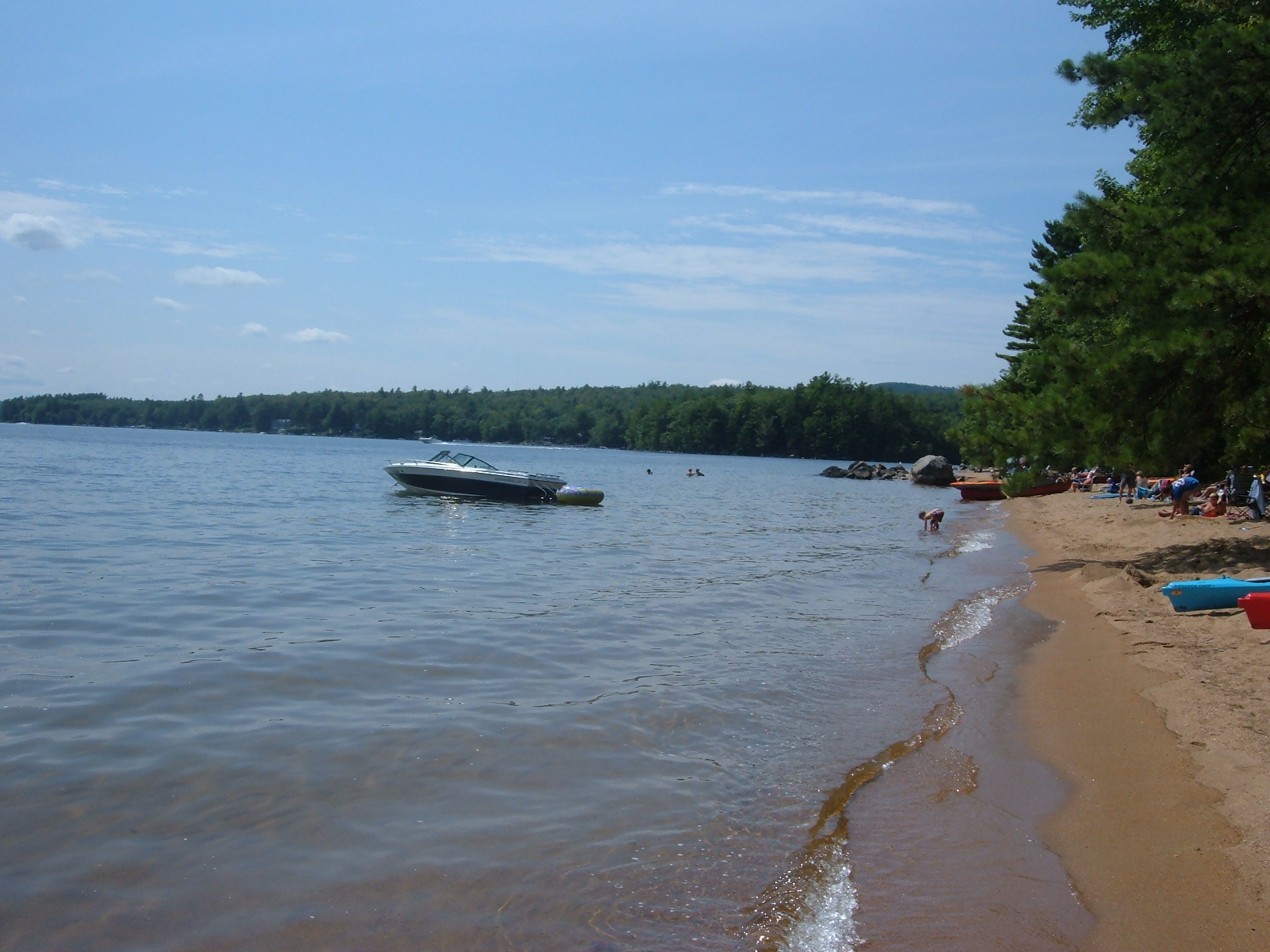
- Witch Cove Beach

- Location within Maine
- Interactive map of Sebago Lake State Park
- Location: Naples and Casco, Maine, United States
- Coordinates: 43°54′43″N 70°34′12″W
- Area: 1,342 acres (5.43 km^{2})
- Elevation: 259 ft (79 m)
- Established: 1938
- Administrator: Maine Department of Agriculture, Conservation and Forestry
- Website: Official website
- Maine State Parks

Sebago Lake State Park is a public recreation area encompassing 1,342 acres (543 ha) on the north shore of Sebago Lake in the towns of Naples and Casco, Cumberland County, Maine. It opened in 1938 as one of Maine's original five state parks. The mostly forested park is divided into east and west sections by the Songo River. It is managed by the Maine Department of Agriculture, Conservation and Forestry.

== Activities and amenities ==
The park offers 250 campsites in two campgrounds, Naples Beach and Witch Cove, each with beaches and boat ramps. Boating and swimming are also available at the day-use area in the park's east section. Other park features include hiking trails and roadway biking.

== Geology ==
The primary geological unit of Sebago Lake State Park is the Sebago Granite.
