= Otisfield, Maine =

- Town
- Seal

- Location within Maine Location within the United States
- Coordinates: 44°05′50″N 70°32′23″W
- Country: United States
- State: Maine
- County: Oxford
- Incorporated: 1798

Area
  - Total: 44.25 sq mi (114.61 km^{2})
  - Land: 39.93 sq mi (103.42 km^{2})
  - Water: 4.32 sq mi (11.19 km^{2})
- Elevation: 673 ft (205 m)

Population (2020)
  - Total: 1,853
  - Density: 46/sq mi (17.9/km^{2})
- Time zone: UTC-5 (Eastern (EST))
  - Summer (DST): UTC-4 (EDT)
- ZIP Code: 04270
- Area code: 207
- FIPS code: 23-55960
- GNIS feature ID: 582655
- Website: www.otisfieldme.gov

Otisfield is a town in Oxford County, Maine, United States. Otisfield is included in the Lewiston-Auburn, Maine metropolitan New England City and Town Area. The population was 1,853 at the 2020 census. Otisfield is a summer recreation area, meaning the population grows substantially in the warmer months. It is also home to Seeds of Peace Camp and Camp Arcadia.

== History ==
It was granted by the Massachusetts General Court on June 15, 1771 to James Otis, Nathaniel Gorham and other descendants of Captain John Gorham and certain members of his company who had fought in the 1690 Battle of Quebec. It replaced a 1736 grant which was ruled invalid when the line between New Hampshire and Massachusetts was redrawn to satisfy claims by the heirs of John Mason. Many early settlers were veterans of the Revolutionary War, with the greater number coming from Groton, Massachusetts. First called Otis Field Plantation, it was incorporated on February 19, 1798 as Otisfield. It then included nearly all of Harrison, set off in 1805, and a large part of Naples, set off in 1834. The town was part of Cumberland County until 1978, when it joined Oxford County.

The surface of the town is uneven with gravelly but productive soil. Farming became the principal occupation, with corn, potatoes and hay the chief crops. Mills were erected at various water power sites, with the first sawmill built 1812. Other industries included gristmills, blacksmith shops, a tannery, a pants factory and shoe shop, a cider mill and cannery for apples, a barrel factory, a shingle mill and a woolen carding mill. Today, Otisfield is largely a recreational area, with camps and summer cottages lining the shores of Pleasant Lake, Thompson Lake, Saturday Pond and Moose Pond.

== Geography ==
According to the United States Census Bureau, the town has a total area of 44.25 square miles (114.61 km^{2}), of which 39.93 square miles (103.42 km^{2}) is land and 4.32 square miles (11.19 km^{2}) is water. Otisfield is drained by the Crooked River.

The town is served by state routes 117 and 121. It borders the towns of Norway to the north, Oxford to the northeast, Poland to the east, Casco and Naples to the south, and Harrison to the west.

== Demographics ==
Historical population
Census	Pop.	Note	%±
1790	197		—
1800	450		128.4%
1810	912		102.7%
1820	1,107		21.4%
1830	1,274		15.1%
1840	1,307		2.6%
1850	1,171		−10.4%
1860	1,199		2.4%
1870	1,099		−8.3%
1880	927		−15.7%
1890	838		−9.6%
1900	728		−13.1%
1910	632		−13.2%
1920	581		−8.1%
1930	568		−2.2%
1940	488		−14.1%
1950	599		22.7%
1960	549		−8.3%
1970	589		7.3%
1980	897		52.3%
1990	1,136		26.6%
2000	1,560		37.3%
2010	1,770		13.5%
2020	1,853		4.7%
U.S. Decennial Census

=== 2010 census ===
As of the census of 2010, there were 1,770 people, 704 households, and 492 families living in the town. The population density was 44.3 inhabitants per square mile (17.1/km^{2}). There were 1,169 housing units at an average density of 29.3 per square mile (11.3/km^{2}). The racial makeup of the town was 97.5% White, 0.3% African American, 0.3% Native American, 0.2% Asian, 0.1% Pacific Islander, and 1.6% from two or more races. Hispanic or Latino of any race were 0.9% of the population.

There were 704 households, of which 29.3% had children under the age of 18 living with them, 58.0% were married couples living together, 8.0% had a female householder with no husband present, 4.0% had a male householder with no wife present, and 30.1% were non-families. 20.9% of all households were made up of individuals, and 8.1% had someone living alone who was 65 years of age or older. The average household size was 2.50 and the average family size was 2.88.

The median age in the town was 44.8 years. 21.4% of residents were under the age of 18; 6.2% were between the ages of 18 and 24; 22.7% were from 25 to 44; 34.8% were from 45 to 64; and 14.7% were 65 years of age or older. The gender makeup of the town was 51.4% male and 48.6% female.

=== 2000 census ===
As of the census of 2000, there were 1,560 people, 595 households, and 452 families living in the town. The population density was 39.0 inhabitants per square mile (15.1/km^{2}). There were 1,011 housing units at an average density of 25.3 per square mile (9.8/km^{2}). The racial makeup of the town was 98.21% White, 0.26% African American, 0.45% Native American, 0.13% Asian, 0.06% Pacific Islander, and 0.90% from two or more races.

There were 595 households, out of which 35.0% had children under the age of 18 living with them, 66.1% were married couples living together, 5.5% had a female householder with no husband present, and 24.0% were non-families. 17.8% of all households were made up of individuals, and 5.9% had someone living alone who was 65 years of age or older. The average household size was 2.61 and the average family size was 2.95.

In the town, the population was spread out, with 25.7% under the age of 18, 4.7% from 18 to 24, 29.9% from 25 to 44, 27.5% from 45 to 64, and 12.2% who were 65 years of age or older. The median age was 39 years. For every 100 females, there were 101.0 males. For every 100 females age 18 and over, there were 99.5 males.

The median income for a household in the town was $43,304, and the median income for a family was $46,652. Males had a median income of $32,167 versus $26,250 for females. The per capita income for the town was $19,142. About 6.7% of families and 9.1% of the population were below the poverty line, including 13.7% of those under age 18 and 2.7% of those age 65 or over.

== Seeds of Peace ==
Otisfield is known throughout the state of Maine for being the home of the Seeds of Peace Camp. Seeds of Peace has been located in Otisfield since its founding in 1993. It is placed on Pleasant Lake and located on the former Camp Powhatan. In 2022, the number of alumni from the Seeds of Peace Camp had passed 8,000.

== Notable person ==
- Horace A. Barrows, 19th century physician, maker of plant-based medicines
