= Long Lake (Maine) =

Lake near Naples, Maine, U.S.

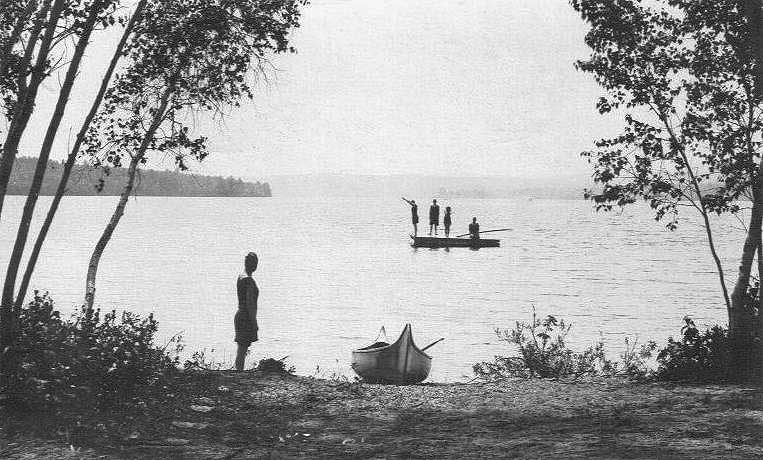

- Location within Maine Location within the United States
- Location: Bridgton / Harrison / Naples, Maine, United States
- Coordinates: 44°02′00″N 70°39′00″W
- Type: mesotrophic
- Primary inflows: Stevens Brook
- Primary outflows: Songo River
- Catchment area: 114 sq mi (300 km^{2})
- Basin countries: United States
- Max. length: 11 miles (18 km)
- Max. width: 1 mile (1.6 km)
- Surface area: 5,295 acres (2,143 ha)
- Average depth: 23 ft (7.0 m)
- Max. depth: 59 ft (18 m)
- Water volume: 129,726 acre⋅ft (160,015,000 m^{3})
- Residence time: 1.1 years
- Shore length^{1}: 38.1 mi (61.3 km)
- Surface elevation: 268 ft (82 m)
- ^{1} Shore length is not a well-defined measure.

Long Lake is a twelve-mile (19 km) lake between the towns of Naples, Maine, Bridgton, Maine and Harrison, Maine. It is connected to Brandy Pond through the Chute River. Long Lake was created by receding glaciers, and has many coves and rocks.

Canal boats from Portland harbor reached Long Lake through the Cumberland and Oxford Canal, completed in 1832. The canal's Songo Lock facilities still control Long Lake water level. Each November, Long Lake is drained by about three feet (0.91 m) so that melting snow does not cause a flood in the spring. The lake is the site of many summer camps, including Camp Newfound, Camp Owatonna, Camp Takajo, and Camp Wildwood (actually located on nearby Wood's Pond).

The famous author, E.B. White, owned a vacation house on Long Lake in the North Bridgton section. Long Lake is the home of fictional character David Drayton in Stephen King's 1980 novella, The Mist, which was made into a 2007 movie, The Mist. Long Lake is the story's opening setting, as well as origin of the mysterious mist.

While the official max depth is listed as 59 ft (18 m), there is a spring near Half Loon Bay, a small bay near Bridgton Academy, that registers as being 216 ft (66 m) deep, according to depth finders on multiple boats.

== See also ==
- Songo River Queen II
