= Sebago Lake =

Second-largest lake in Maine, US

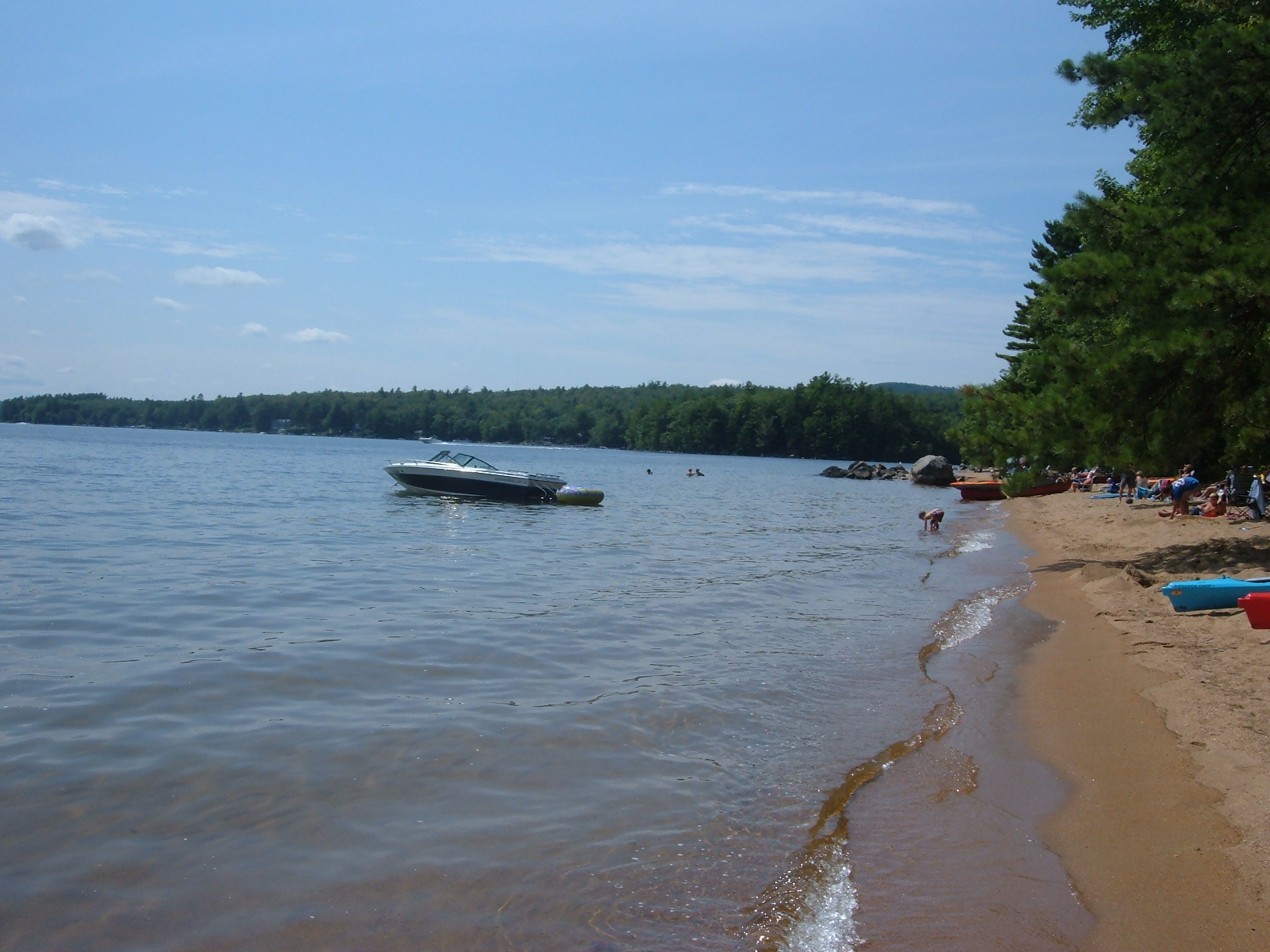
- A beach in Sebago Lake State Park

- Location within Maine Location within the United States
- Location: Cumberland County, Maine
- Coordinates: 43°51′N 70°34′W
- Lake type: oligotrophic
- Primary outflows: Presumpscot River
- Catchment area: 440 square miles (1,100 km^{2})
- Basin countries: United States
- Max. length: 12 mi (19 km)
- Surface area: 30,513 acres (12,348 ha)
- Average depth: 107 ft (33 m)
- Max. depth: 316 ft (96 m)
- Water volume: 3,224,233 acre⋅ft (3.977033×10^{9} m^{3})
- Residence time: 5.1 to 5.4 yrs
- Shore length^{1}: 105 miles (169 km)
- Surface elevation: 267 ft (81 m)
- Islands: Frye Island
- Settlements: Casco, Naples, Raymond, Sebago, Standish and Windham
- ^{1} Shore length is not a well-defined measure.

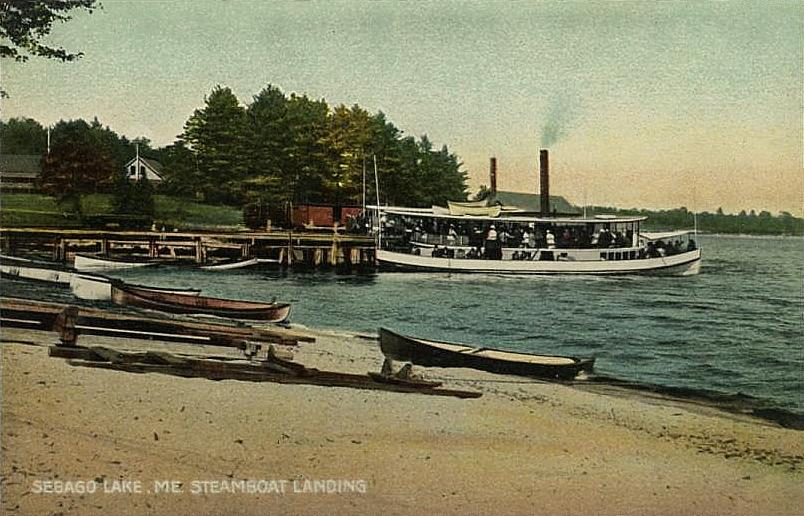
Steamboat Landing in c. 1910

Sebago Lake (Sih-BAY-Goh) is the deepest and second-largest lake in the U.S. state of Maine. The lake is 316 feet (96 m) deep at its deepest point, with a mean depth of 107 feet (33 m). Sebago is the deepest lake wholly contained within the entire New England region. Along with Lake Champlain, Sebago is one of the only lakes in the area that does not consistently freeze solid during the winter months, with total ice cover occurring for only a short period of time every few winters. Sebago covers about 50 square miles (129 km^{2}) in surface area and the surface is around 270 feet (82 m) above sea level, so the deep bottom is below the present sea level. It is in Cumberland County, and bordered by the towns of Casco, Naples, Raymond, Sebago, Standish and Windham. The seasonally occupied town of Frye Island is on an island in the lake. Sebago Lake and the surrounding area is known for its erratic and sudden changes in weather during all seasons, likely due to its proximity to the Atlantic Ocean and to Mt. Washington, a very notorious extreme weather hotspot. The name comes from the Abenaki sobagoo, meaning "it is the sea" or "it resembles the sea".

== History ==
Two Corsair fighter planes were destroyed in a fatal midair collision over the lake on 16 May 1944.

== Transportation ==
The lake is connected to Brandy Pond by the Songo River and eventually to Long Lake in Naples. The lake is drained primarily by the Presumpscot River. The lake and rivers were an early transportation corridor from the coast to the interior, and encouraged the first incorporated European settlement of interior Maine in 1762. Sebago Lake was linked to Portland harbor by the Cumberland and Oxford Canal in 1832. The outlet to the Presumpscot River was controlled for the canal by the Eel Weir Dam and the Head Dam, owned and operated by the Oriental Powder Company after the canal was replaced by a railroad and by the S. D. Warren Paper Mill after 1878.

The lake was a comparatively safe place for training military pilots from NAS Brunswick about flying over water; but several navy planes were lost over the lake during World War II. A Grumman TBF Avenger from the Lewiston Naval Auxiliary Air Facility ditched and sank near Raymond on 16 August 1943. Two low-flying British Vought Corsairs from Brunswick were lost after a mid-air collision over the lake near Raymond on 16 May 1944; and a third Corsair flew into the lake on July 16. In December 2014 a yellow Piper PA-18 Super Cub monoplane landed on a Sebago Lake beach, in what some believe is the first landing of a plane on Sebago beaches.

== Water supply ==
Sebago Lake is the primary water supply for the Portland Water District, which serves the Greater Portland region and about 20% of Maine's population. The lake's watershed is more than 50 miles (80 km) long and covers parts of 24 Maine towns.

The direct watershed is about 171 square miles (443 km^{2}) of land plus the 45 square miles (117 km^{2}) of the lake, and the indirect watershed about 190 square miles (490 km^{2}) of land plus about 28 square miles (73 km^{2}) of other bodies of water. As of May 1990, roughly 86% of the watershed was forests and fallow fields, 2.5% in active timber operations, 9.3% in residential, agricultural, and commercial use, and 2.2% used for other purposes.

The lake holds roughly 995 billion US gallons (3.77×10^{9} m^{3}) of water that on average resides 5.1 to 5.4 years in the lake. Water inflow is estimated at 544 million US gallons (2,060,000 m^{3}) per day and outflow at 498 million US gallons (1,890,000 m^{3}) per day, of which 24 million US gallons (91,000 m^{3})/day are for the water district.

== Recreation ==
In 1938, the state of Maine purchased and opened Sebago Lake State Park as one of its original five state parks. However, the area was known as a public recreation center even before this. The park now consists of 1,400 acres (5.7 km^{2}), is open year-round, and has facilities including two public boat launches, an expansive natural sandbar for swimming, and a 250-site campground. There are also numerous private beach clubs and campgrounds spread around the lake, such as Point Sebago in Casco, which contains numerous cottages and facilities that can be rented out to guests.

Sebago Lake hosts a sailing instruction and charter service and is located in what Maine's tourism industry refers to as the Western Lakes and Mountains Region.

Efforts are underway to complete the Sebago to the Sea Trail, a trail running 28 miles from Sebago Lake to Casco Bay, mostly following the path of the Presumpscot River.

=== Fishing ===
The lake is the likely point of origin of the landlocked salmon, stated in the species' scientific name (Salmo salar sebago). At one point, the entire watershed was under seawater, and the first populations of these marine animals became established as the land rose and seawaters retreated.

Other game fish that can be found in the lake include lake trout, brook trout, brown trout, largemouth bass, and northern pike. Some of these are regularly stocked by the state, or came to the lake naturally. However, others were introduced illegally, particularly bass and pike. The state encourages anglers to kill, hold, and notify them of all northern pike taken in the lake because they were introduced illegally, are not native to the region, and could disrupt the lake ecosystem, including that of Sebago Lake's original fish species, such as the landlocked salmon.

Ice fishing for the aforementioned Trout and Pike populations is also popular in areas where it is safely possible, with annual fishing derbies held in the smaller “Jordan Bay” portion of the lake.

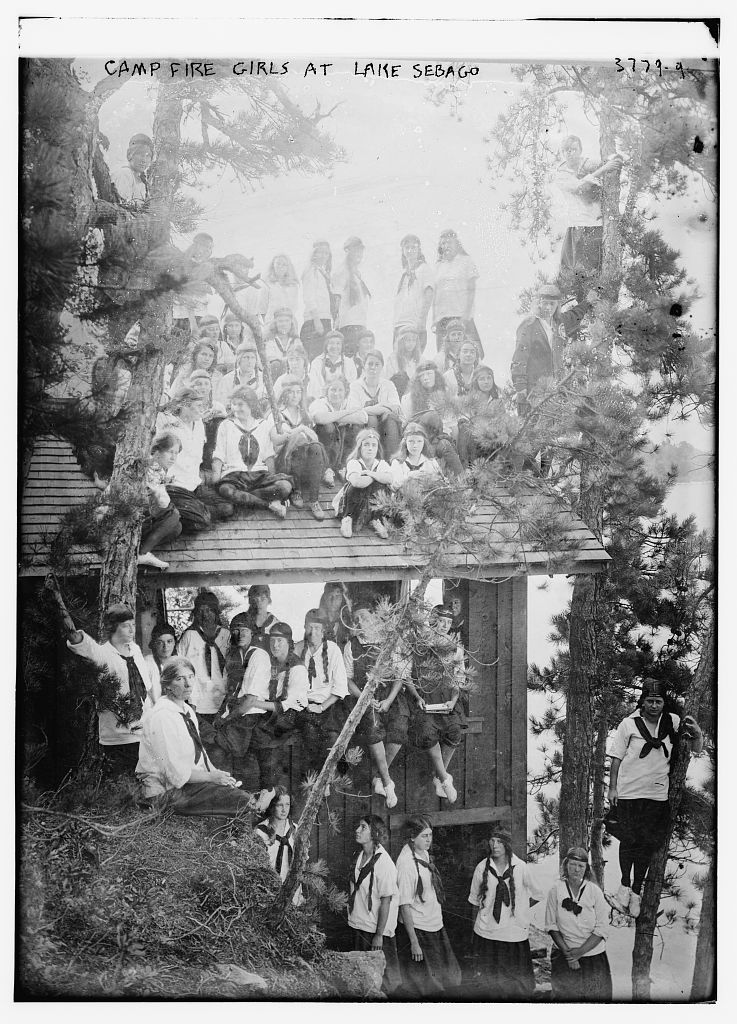
Camp Fire Girls of America at Sebago Lake in 1916

== Camps ==
The lake also contains numerous summer camp options for children of all ages, genders, and skillsets:

Center Day Camp, an all-inclusive day camp run by the Jewish Community Alliance of Southern Maine, is located on the Eastern Shore of the lake in the town of Windham.

Camp O-At-Ka, founded in 1906, is a boy's sleep-away camp located along a half mile of waterfront in the northwest corner of Sebago Lake.

Camp Sebago, a co-ed camp geared towards 7-12 year olds and run by The Salvation Army, is located on the southwestern corner of the lake.

Camp Wohelo, the original Camp Fire Girls camp (WOrk HEalth LOve) was established on Sebago Lake in 1907. Founded by Luther Halsey Gulick and Charlotte Vetter Gulick, known by their native American names of Timanous and Hiitini, the camp strove to teach independence and back woods skills to young girls aged 6–16. Wohelo is still strong today.
