= Camp Timanous =

Summer camp in Raymond, Maine, US

Camp Timanous is a summer camp in Raymond, Maine. It offers a traditional program of land and water activities, aimed at developing "Body, Mind, and Spirit". Camp Timanous is both a progenitor of the Maine sleepaway camping tradition and industry and is one of the oldest continually operating summer camps in America. In a typical summer, some 40,000 children participate in youth summer programs, mostly at one of Maine's 200 licensed summer camps, such as Camp Timanous.

== History ==
Timanous was founded in 1887 in Connecticut by American physical fitness education pioneer Luther Halsey Gulick (1865–1918), who also founded the Camp Fire Girls in 1910 and was instrumental in the development of the YMCA, basketball, and volleyball. Upon his death, Luther’s wife, Charlotte V. Guilick, continued operation of the camp. In 1920, the Gulicks moved the boys' camp to the current Raymond, Maine, location on Panther Pond, a large offshoot of Sebago Lake. J. Halsey Guilick, son of Luther and Charlotte, became director after Charlotte’s death in 1928.

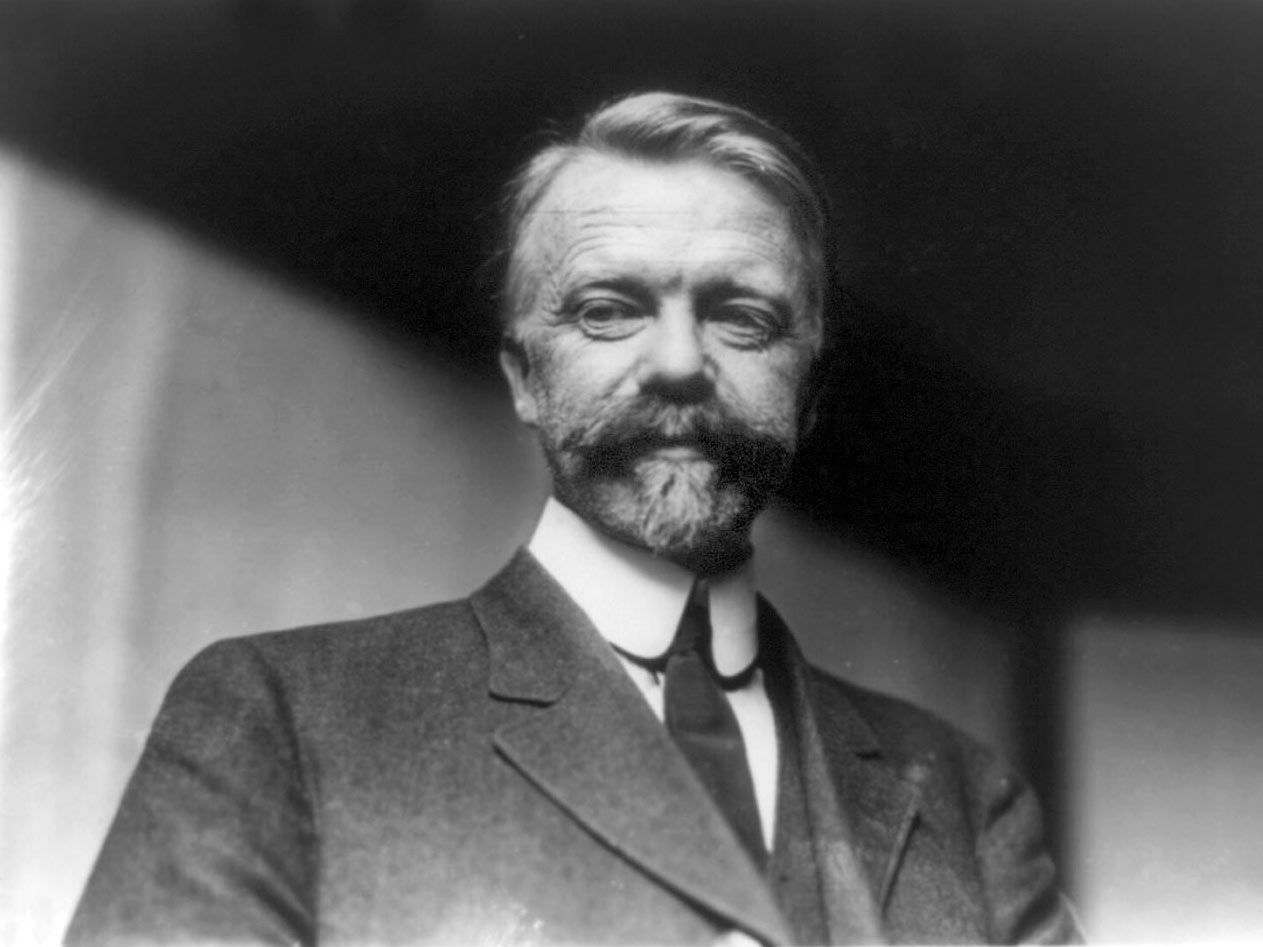
Gulick, camp founder

The name "Timanous" derives from the Indian name Gulick was known by, meaning "Guiding Spirit". In 1907, Gulick founded a sister camp, Wohelo, with which Timanous interacts through dances, swim meets and various races.

John H. and Martha Suitor purchased the camp from the Gulick family and began operating it in 1942. In the early 1980s, the Suitors' two sons, John H. Jr. “Jack” and David, became directors. Camp Timanous was owned and operated by David and Linda Suitor, who became active directors in 1983. In 2018, camp transitioned to a nonprofit organization governed by the Board of Trustees, owned by the Timanous Foundation. Also that year, Garth Altenburg was hired as the director of the camp. In 2025, John H. Suitor III, son of Jack, became director of the camp.

Staff, campers, and counselors have a very high return rate. In 2006, 93% of the 50 counseling staff were former campers, averaging over 10 years at camp (12 were teachers). There is no indoor plumbing nor electricity in living quarters at Timanous.

== Facilities and campus ==
Intended for boys aged 7 to 15, the summer is divided into two three-and-a-half-week-long sessions, and many campers choose to attend both. It is on 180 acres (0.73 km^{2}) of land abutting Panther Pond in Raymond, Maine. There are typically around 125 campers at camp at any given point in the summer.

Campers live in one of the 10 wooden cabins (otherwise known as "bunks"), a large tent or a waterside structure called "The Nest".

== Program ==
=== Sports and activities ===
At the outset, the Timanous daily program served as a model for Gulick to originate and test ideas later implemented in the Camp Fire program, helping form the traditional notions of American camping. In a typical day at today's camp, campers participate in both instructional and recreational activity; options include baseball, tennis, soccer, running, sailing, canoeing and boating, water skiing, handicrafts, woodshop, riflery, climbing wall and archery.

=== Camping trips and camp events ===
Sharing a common heritage although under different ownership today, Timanous and Wohelo have a long history of interacting all summer long. The camps hold dances and swim meets, as well as organize a "brother-sister day", during which Wohelo and Timanous campers with siblings at the opposite camp will spend a couple of hours together.

=== Watersports ===
On the morning of the final day of the summer, the camp is again split into the two green and gray teams, and the campers participate in Watersports Day, a final competition between the two colors, with events including war canoe, kayak and swim races.

== Culture ==
Timanous "T" logo

The commitment to "Body, Mind, and Spirit" remains best identified with the Timanous "T", a triangular emblem. Each corner of the triangle represents one of the three ideals that Camp Timanous is based around.

== Notable alumni ==
- Peter Gammons, sports writer and ESPN personality
- Porter J. Goss, former Director of the CIA
- Luther H. Gulick, camping, basketball, volleyball and physical education innovator
- Karl N. Llewellyn, scholar and proponent of American legal realism
- Samuel Pickering, author and professor
