= Thomas Pond =

- Location within Maine Location within the United States
- Location: Maine
- Coordinates: 43°55′N 70°31′W
- Lake type: Reservoir
- Primary outflows: Sebago Lake
- Basin countries: United States
- Max. length: 1.4 mi (2.3 km)
- Max. width: 1 mi (1.6 km)
- Surface area: 533 acres (216 ha)
- Max. depth: 64 feet (20 m)
- Water volume: 10,527 acre⋅ft (12,985,000 m^{3})
- Surface elevation: 279 ft (85 m)

Thomas Pond is adjacent to U.S. Route 302 on the border of Raymond and Casco, Maine. The shoreline is heavily developed with residences and seasonal cabins, and there is a boat launching area near the highway where the pond overflows into Sebago Lake. White perch, chain pickerel, smallmouth bass, and largemouth bass thrive in the shallow portions of the pond; and land-locked Atlantic salmon use the deeper parts of the pond preying on rainbow smelt.
