= Friends School (Casco, Maine) =

- Formerly listed on the U.S. National Register of Historic Places
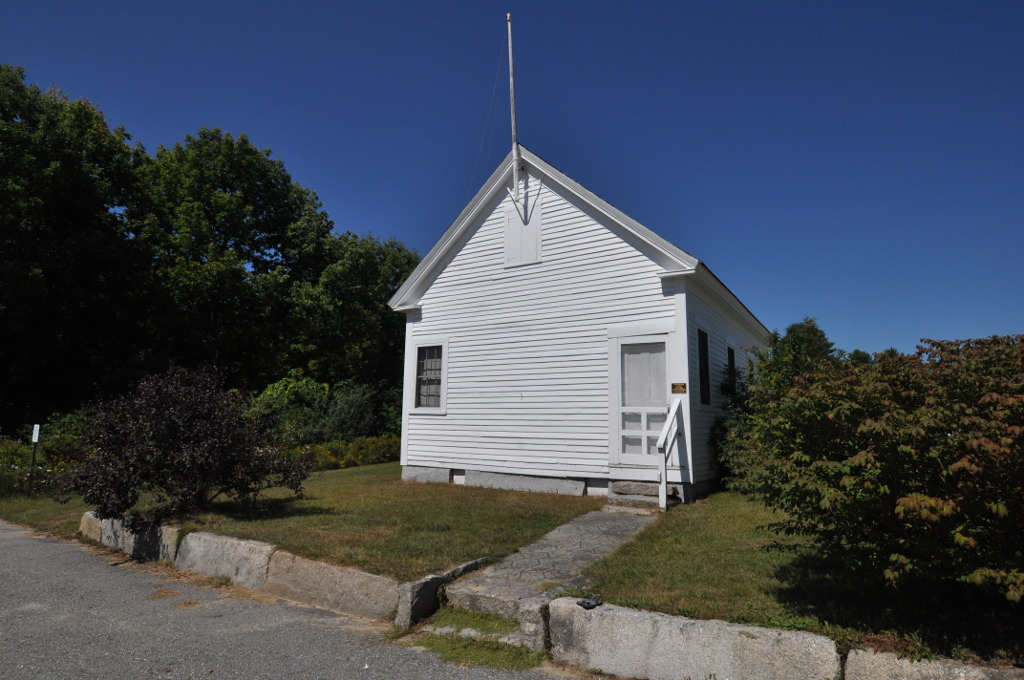
- 2014 photo

- Location within Maine Location within the United States
- Location: Behind the town offices on SR 121, Casco, Maine
- Coordinates: 44°0′15″N 70°31′24″W
- Area: less than one acre
- Built: 1849
- Built by: Clark N. Maxfield
- Architectural style: Mid 19th Century Revival
- NRHP reference No.: 96000650

Significant dates
- Added to NRHP: June 24, 1996
- Removed from NRHP: December 21, 2020

The Friends School was a historic schoolhouse in the village center of Casco, Maine. Built in 1849, it was a well-preserved example of a 19th-century one-room schoolhouse. Converted to a museum operated by the local historical society, it was listed on the National Register of Historic Places in 1996, and was destroyed by arsonists in 2018. It was located behind the town office building on Maine State Route 121.

== Description and history ==
The Friends School was located in the village center of Casco, on the west side of Meadow Road (SR 121), behind the town offices and library, between the municipal parking lot and a tennis court. It was a small single-story wood frame structure, with a gabled roof and clapboard siding, and is set on concrete piers. The front facade had a single doorway on the far right, and a sash window on the far left, with a covered window-sized opening in the gable. The sides had three windows each. The interior had a small vestibule, which spanned the building width, and a single classroom, finished in wainscoting below, and plaster on lath above.

The school was built in 1849, and was originally locate on Quaker Ridge Road, near the town's Quaker meeting house. It served the town's fourth district until the schools were consolidated in 1942. After passing through a number of private hands, it was given to the town, and moved to the town center in 1971. It was maintained by the local historical society as a museum property at the time of its 2018 destruction by local arsonists.

== See also ==
- National Register of Historic Places listings in Cumberland County, Maine
