= Appleton A. Mason =

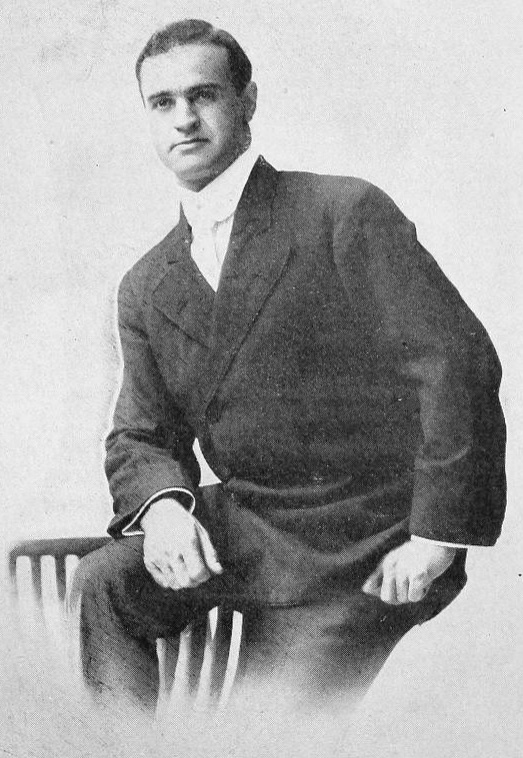
- Mason pictured in Jambalaya 1911, Tulane yearbook

Biographical details
- Born: June 11, 1880; Parrsboro, Nova Scotia, Canada
- Died: December 20, 1938 (aged 58); New Rochelle, New York, U.S.

Playing career

Football
- 1905: Springfield

Coaching career (HC unless noted)

Football
- 1908–1909: Warrensburg Teachers
- 1910–1912: Tulane
- 1918: NYU

Basketball
- 1908–1910: Warrensburg Teachers
- 1912–1913: Tulane

Administrative career (AD unless noted)
- 1908–1909: Warrensburg Teachers
- 1910–1913: Tulane

Head coaching record
- Overall: 15–23–4 (football); 23–13 (basketball)

Appleton Adams Mason (June 11, 1880 – December 20, 1938) was an American college football and college basketball coach and physical education instructor. He served as the head football coach at Warrensburg Teachers College—now known as the University of Central Missouri—from 1908 to 1909, Tulane University from 1910 to 1912, and New York University (NYU) in 1918, compiling a career college football head coaching record of 15–23–4. Mason was also the head basketball coach Warrensburg Teachers from 1908 to 1910 and at Tulane for the 1912–13 season, tallying a career college basketball head coaching mark of 23–13.

Mason was born on June 11, 1880, Parrsboro, Nova Scotia. He attended Springfield College, where he was a captain of the football team and competed on the track and field team. Mason died on December 20, 1938, at New Rochelle Hospital in New Rochelle, New York.

== Camp Agawam ==
Mason was the founder of Camp Agawam in Raymond, Maine. He founded the camp in 1919. Mason went to Crescent Lake in Raymond every summer. Following his death in 1938, he was succeeded as camp director in 1939 by his son, Appleton Mason, Jr.

== Head coaching record ==
=== Football ===
Year	Team	Overall	Conference	Standing	Bowl/playoffs
Warrensburg Teachers () (1908–1909)
1908	Warrensburg Teachers	2–3–1			
1909	Warrensburg Teachers	3–3–2			
Warrensburg Teachers:		5–6–3			
Tulane Olive and Blue (Independent) (1910–present)
1910	Tulane	0–7			
Tulane Olive and Blue (Southern Intercollegiate Athletic Association) (1911–1912)
1911	Tulane	5–3–1	3–3	T–8th	
1912	Tulane	5–3	3–3	T–8th	
Tulane:		10–13–1	6–6		
NYU Violets (Independent) (1918)
1918	NYU	0–4			
NYU:		0–4			
Total:		15–23–4			
