= Friends Meetinghouse =

A Friends meeting house is a meeting house of the Religious Society of Friends (Quakers).

Friends Meetinghouse may also refer to:

- Friends Meetinghouse (Wilmington, Delaware)
- Friends Meetinghouse (Uxbridge, Massachusetts)
- Friends Meetinghouse (Casco, Maine)
- Friends Meetinghouse (Dover, New Jersey)
- Friends Meetinghouse (Mount Pleasant, Ohio)
- Friends Meetinghouse (Jamestown, Rhode Island)
