= Tenny River =

Coordinates: 43.93952°N 70.47117°W

Location
- Country: United States

Physical characteristics
- Source
  - location: Maine

The Tenny River is a 1.0-mile-long (1.6 km) navigable stream connecting Crescent Lake with Panther Pond in the town of Raymond in the U.S. state of Maine. The river drops just one foot in elevation over its course, from 278 feet (85 m) above sea level at Crescent Lake to 277 feet (84 m) at Panther Pond, the outlet of which (Panther Run) then drops another 10 feet (3.0 m) to Sebago Lake. The Tenny River is part of the Presumpscot River watershed, flowing to Casco Bay, an arm of the Atlantic Ocean.

== See also ==
- List of rivers of Maine
