= Camp Agawam =

- Interactive map of Camp Agawam
- Location: Raymond, Maine, U.S.
- Coordinates: 43.983977°N 70.466392°W
- Type: sleepaway
- Land: 125 acres
- Facilities: 3 clay tennis courts (2 lighted), 1800 ft. lakefront property, 1 all-weather tennis court, basketball court, baseball/softball field, 3 soccer/lacrosse fields, volleyball court, badminton court, 60-meter archery range and a 50-foot rifle range.
- Water: Crescent Lake
- Fee: $13,250 (Note: Fee is for a single camper for a 7-week session in 2026.)
- Operated by: Agawam Council
- Established: 1919 (107 years ago)
- Website: campagawam.org

Camp Agawam is a boys' camp located on Crescent Lake in Raymond, Maine, United States, and is one of the oldest summer camps for boys in the United States. The camp was founded in 1919 by Appleton A. Mason, and remained in the Mason family until 1985. The Boston Globe described the camp in 1988 as "an old camp with old ideas." However, in 2009, Senator Susan Collins described its program as "unique and exciting." It is noted for its award-winning charitable program, Main Idea, which enables underprivileged boys to attend the camp. The camp is run as a non-profit organization, directed by "Doc" David Potter, who was named Agawam's Executive Director in 2025.

== History ==
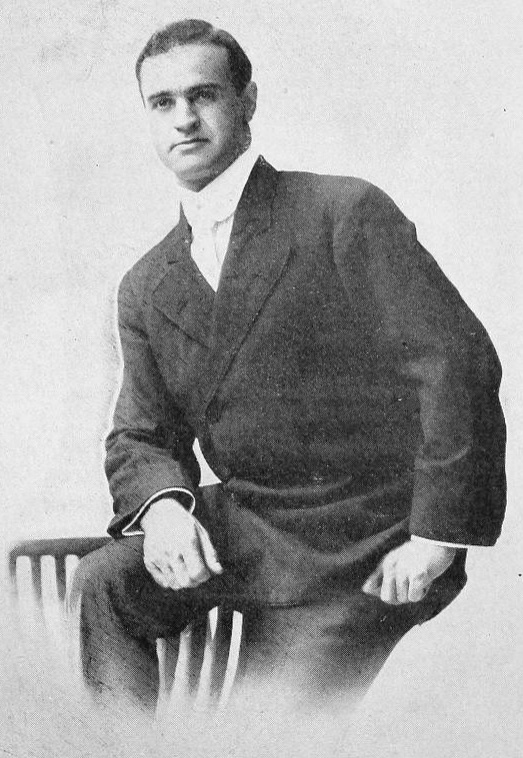
Founder Appleton Mason, Sr

Camp Agawam was founded in 1919 by Appleton A. Mason, known as "The Governor", an American football player, coach of football and basketball, and physical education instructor. The camp was run by him until his death in 1938, and then officially taken over by his sons, Appleton Mason, Jr (1939–1956) and David W. Mason (1957–1985) with significant help and guidance from his wife and their mother Peg Mason. In 1985, after the retirement of Dave and Peg Mason, a group of former campers and counselors came together to purchase Agawam, with the goal of ensuring that Agawam would continue to thrive as a summer camp. They formed the nonprofit Agawam Council, whose Board of Directors includes alumni and parents who work closely with camp leadership to ensure Agawam continues to thrive. The camp in the late 1980s was still run along traditional lines, according to Peter Anderson of the Boston Globe, writing in 1988, who calls it "an old camp with old ideas." He describes traditions such as bugle calls for reveille and retreat, when the camp's flag is lowered, candle-lit processions, and former campers being remembered with flat stones and totem poles dating back to 1934.

== Camp Program ==
Camp Agawam is a residential summer camp for boys ages eight to 15. During a structured seven-week program, Campers choose among a broad range of activities each day, including tennis, sailing, Ranger Trail (outdoor living skills), archery, music, arts and crafts, woodshop, and many other land and water sports and activities. The program encourages campers to experience all activities while allowing ample time to pursue personal interests. Each camper is given guidance in selecting his program, balancing recreation with skill and knowledge development, competition with cooperation, and structure with flexibility. Many activity curricula incorporate a multilevel award system to monitor progress and provide motivation. The blend of structure and choice is what makes Camp Agawam an experience that uniquely belongs to the camper.

Throughout the camp season, boys compete in the Ag vs. Wam season. The boys are split into one of two teams, Ag or Wam, of which you are a member for life. The boys compete in all different activities so that one team will prevail. However, their main focus is "leadership and character building that is developed through daily interaction with mentors and peers," as well as their unique "Katiaki" program which utilizes personalized growth goals made by counselors for the campers. Each week, every camper is assigned a “Katiaki” – a goal to work toward that is related to his character, personality, or skills in relating to others. Agawam emphasizes creating an environment for discovering and enhancing personal and interpersonal skills.

== Main Idea Program ==
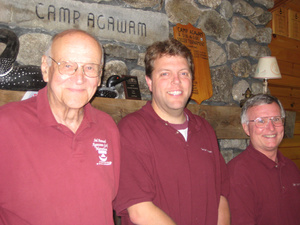
Former camp directors (L to R): Dave Mason, Erik Calhoun, Garth Nelson

David Mason and his wife Peg founded the Main Idea program in 1971. The program provides a week of camp for local Maine boys who might otherwise never get the chance to attend camp. Mason states: "I wanted to do something for the boys living around here, who see out-of-state campers come and go each year, but think that camp is an experience that will never come their way." By 2005, the program had involved over 2,600 boys, and had gained local and national media coverage. Senator Susan Collins described the initiative in 2009 as "truly a meaningful investment in Maine's most precious resource—our children." As of 2014, the program is offered to over one hundred boys aged 9–15 years annually a free week's camp attendance in June.

== Awards ==
Main Idea was awarded the American Camp Association's Eleanor P. Eells Award for Program Excellence in 2004/2005, and also was recognized as one of the top summer camps according to Richard Kennedy. Two past camp directors, David Mason and his successor Garth R. Nelson, received Halsey Gulick Awards for their services to the "organized youth camping movement in Maine".

== In popular culture ==
Camp Agawam is mentioned in two novels set in Maine by Stephen King, Pet Sematary and Dreamcatcher.
