= Crescent Lake (Maine) =

Lake in Maine, United States

- Rattlesnake Pond (formerly)
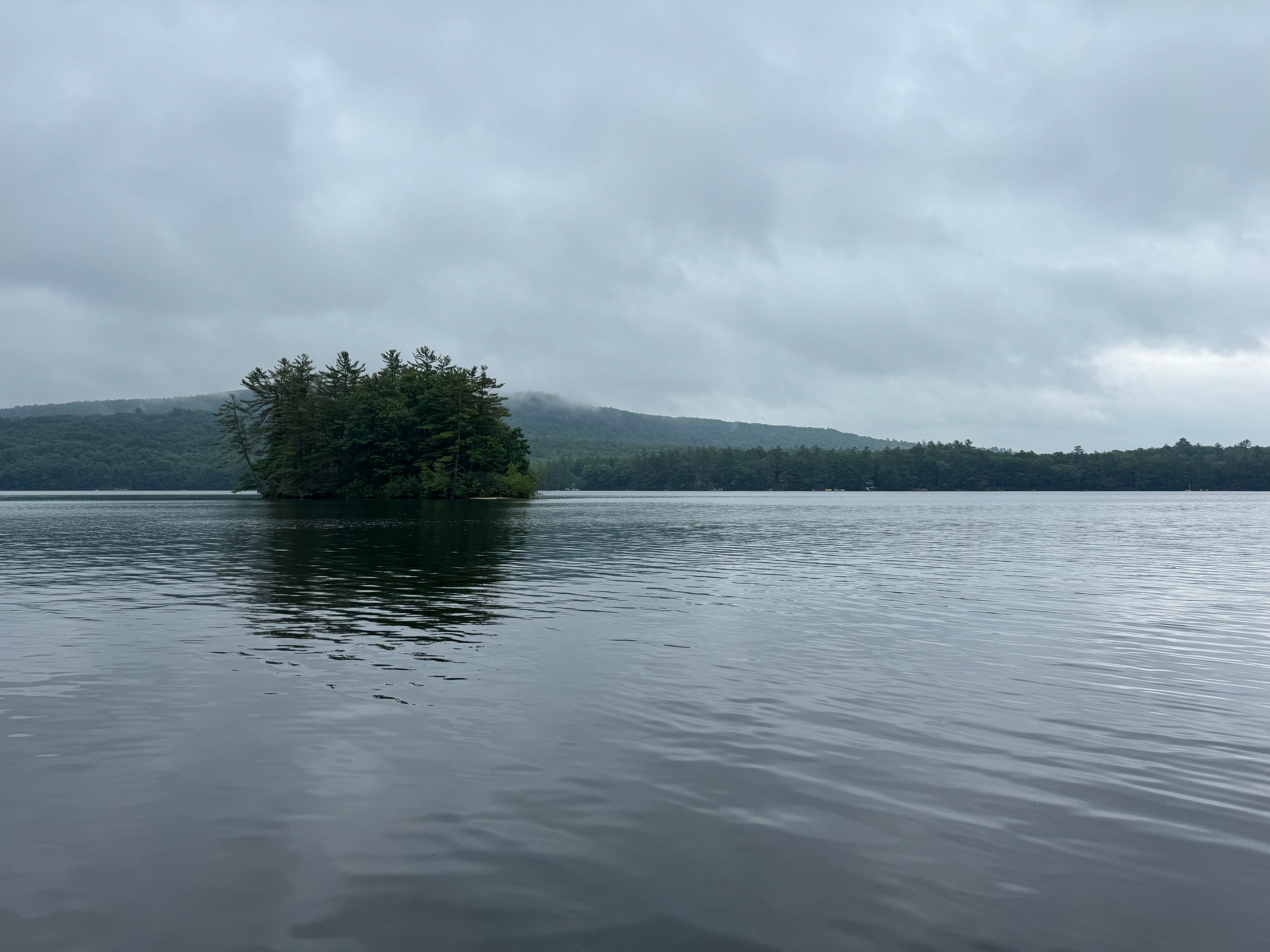
- A view from the western shores of the lake

- Location within Maine
- Location: Raymond, Maine, U.S.
- Coordinates: 43.97424°N 70.45679°W
- Basin countries: United States
- Surface area: 716 acres (3 km^{2})
- Max. depth: 54 ft (16 m)
- Water volume: 12,996 acre⋅ft (16,030,000 m^{3})
- Surface elevation: 278 ft (85 m)

Crescent Lake (formerly known as Rattlesnake Pond) is a lake in Raymond, Maine, United States. It is located around 3.5 miles (5.6 km) north of the center of Raymond. A few other lakes surround it, including Panther Pond to the south (to which it is connected by the Tenny River), Raymond Pond to the east, Thompson Lake to the north and Dumpling Pond and Coffee Pond to the west. It has a surface area of 716 acres (3 km^{2}) and a maximum depth of 54 ft (16 m), which occurs in its northeastern section. Its shoreline runs for 8.9 miles (14.3 km).

Webbs Mills Road, part of Maine State Route 85, passes to the west of the lake, running in a north–south direction, connecting Raymond, East Raymond and the village of Crescent Lake.

Camp Agawam, one of the oldest summer camps for boys in the United States, is situated on the northwestern shores of the lake.

Crescent Lake Watershed Association was formed in 2008.

== Geography ==
Crescent Lake receives drainage from Coffee Pond and Dumpling Pond in northern Casco and extends south into Raymond. The southern end of the lake overflows through the Tenny River to Panther Pond 1 mile (1.6 km) to south. The town of Raymond maintains a small boat ramp and swimming area on Webbs Mills Road (Maine State Route 85) at the southern end of the lake.

== Wildlife ==
When Crescent Lake was surveyed in 1995, the following fish were found to be present:

- Landlocked salmon
- Rainbow smelt
- Smallmouth bass
- Largemouth bass
- White perch
- Chain pickerel
- Golden shiner
- Bridled shiner
- Fallfish (chub)
- White sucker
- Creek chubsucker
- Hornpout (bullhead)
- Banded killfish
- Pumpkinseed sunfish
- American eel
- Cusk

Dissolved oxygen deficiency below the 11-meter (36 ft) summer thermocline limits suitability for cold-water fish; but the lake still supports populations of cusk and rainbow smelt. Crescent Lake is better known locally for its white perch and smallmouth bass fishing.
