= Casco (CDP), Maine =

Casco, Maine
- Census-designated place
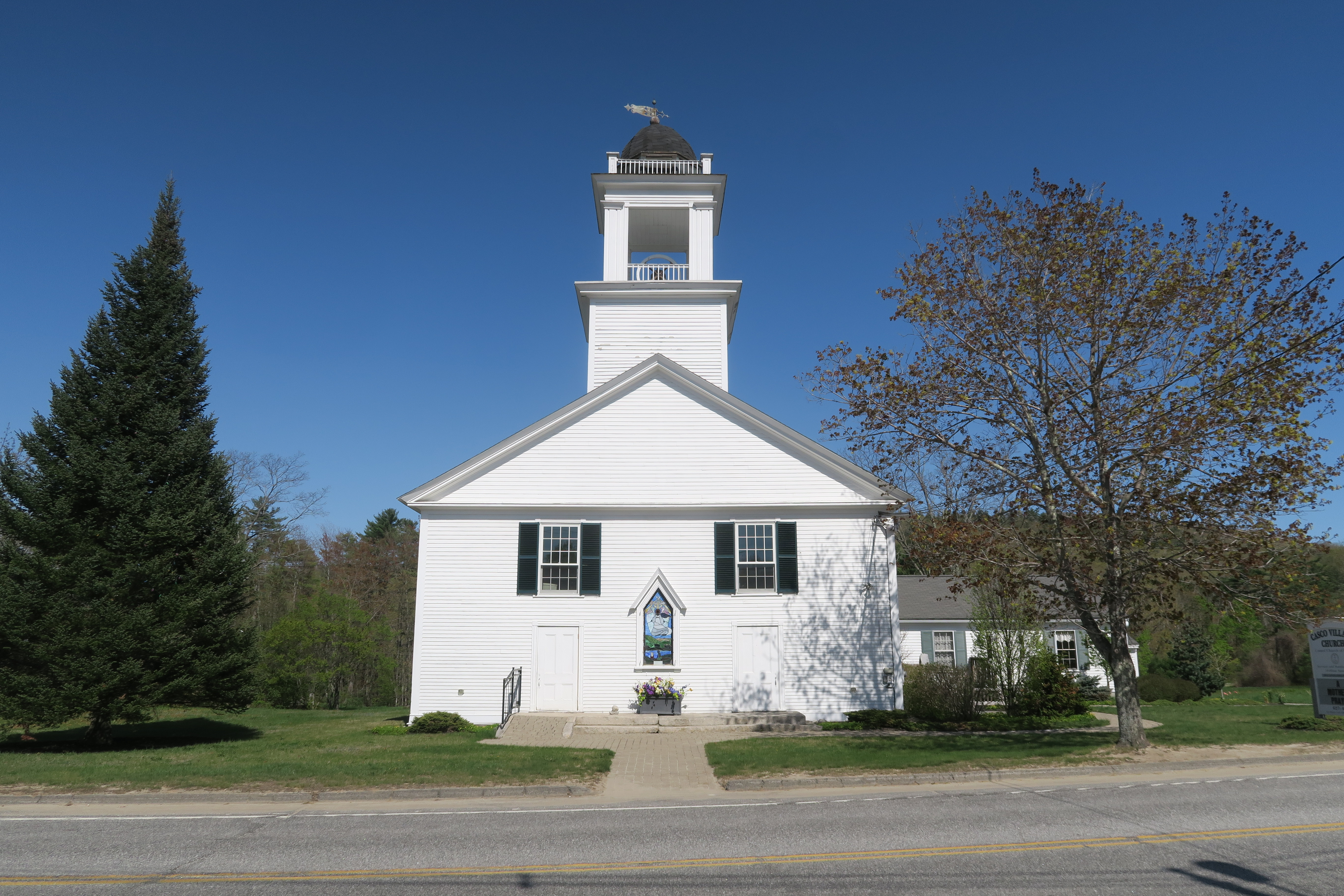
- Casco Village Church

- Location in Cumberland County and the state of Maine
- Coordinates: 44°00′14″N 70°31′44″W
- Country: United States
- State: Maine
- County: Cumberland
- Town: Casco

Area
  - Total: 3.54 sq mi (9.17 km^{2})
  - Land: 3.28 sq mi (8.50 km^{2})
  - Water: 0.26 sq mi (0.67 km^{2})
- Elevation: 597 ft (182 m)

Population (2020)
  - Total: 582
  - Density: 177.3/sq mi (68.45/km^{2})
- Time zone: UTC-5 (Eastern (EST))
  - Summer (DST): UTC-4 (EDT)
- ZIP code: 04015
- Area code: 207
- FIPS code: 23-11090
- GNIS feature ID: 2583554

Casco is a census-designated place (CDP) in the town of Casco in Cumberland County, Maine, United States. The population of the CDP was 587 at the 2010 census. It is part of the Portland–South Portland–Biddeford, Maine Metropolitan Statistical Area.

== Geography ==
According to the United States Census Bureau, the CDP has a total area of 3.6 square miles (9.2 km^{2}), of which 3.3 square miles (8.5 km^{2}) is land and 0.27 square miles (0.7 km^{2}), or 7.28%, is water. It is located along Maine State Route 121 near the northern corner of the town of Casco, at the outlet of Pleasant Lake.

== Demographics ==
Historical population
Census	Pop.	Note	%±
2020	582		—
U.S. Decennial Census
