= South Casco, Maine =

- Village
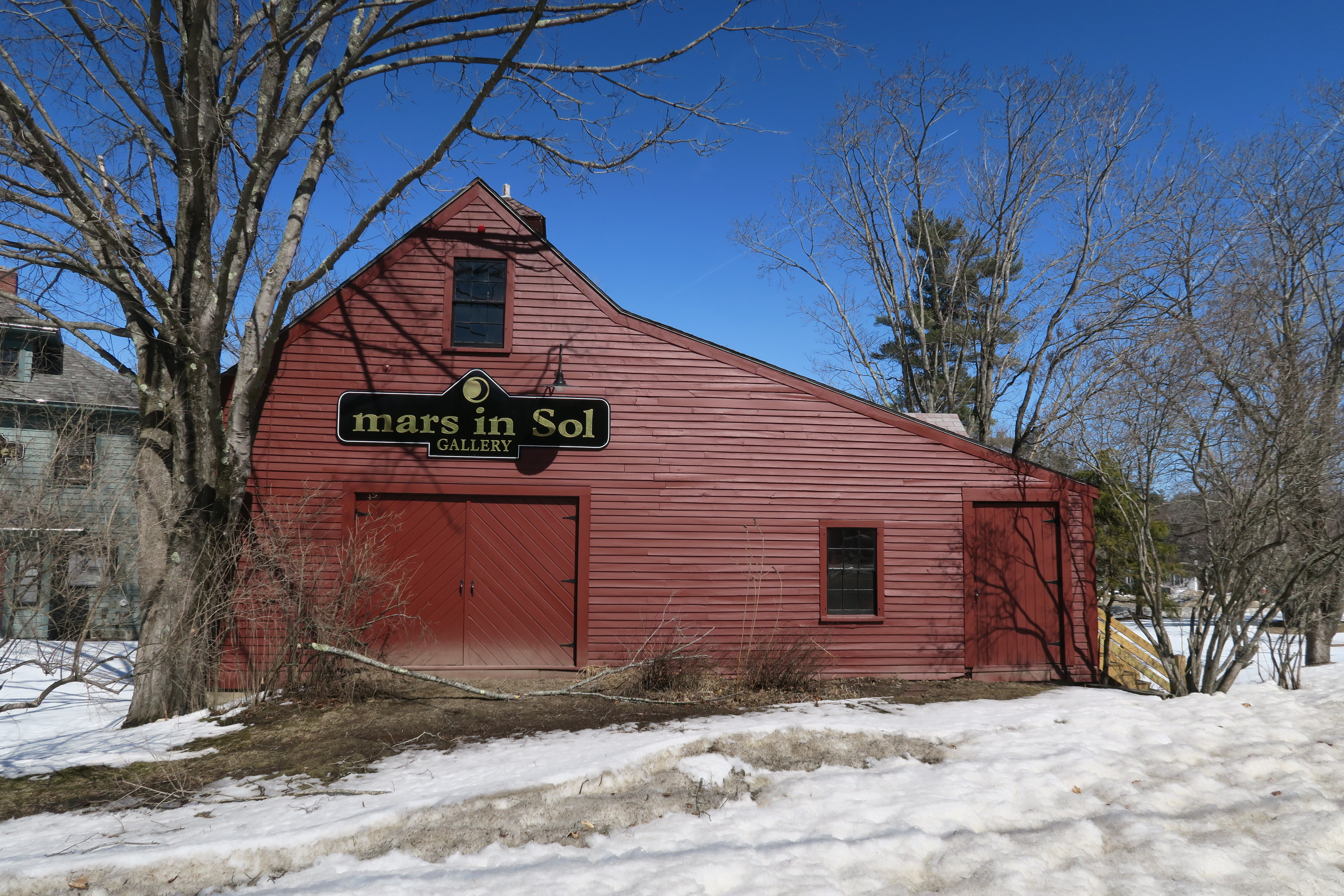
- Mars in Sol Gallery

- Location within Maine
- Coordinates: 43°54′53″N 70°31′04″W
- Country: United States
- State: Maine
- County: Cumberland
- Elevation: 318 ft (97 m)
- Time zone: UTC-5 (Eastern (EST))
  - Summer (DST): UTC-4 (EDT)
- ZIP code: 04077
- Area code: 207
- GNIS feature ID: 575828

South Casco is an unincorporated village in the town of Casco, Cumberland County, Maine, United States. The community is located along U.S. Route 302 and Maine State Route 35 near the town's border with Raymond and the north shore of Sebago Lake. South Casco has a post office with ZIP code 04077.
