= Maine State Route 85 =

State highway in Cumberland County, Maine, US

State Route 85
- Webbs Mills Road

Route information
- Maintained by MaineDOT
- Length: 7.98 mi (12.84 km)
- Existed: 1948–present

Major junctions
- South end: US 302 / SR 35 in Raymond
- North end: SR 11 in Casco

Location
- Country: United States
- State: Maine
- Counties: Cumberland

Highway system
- Maine State Highway System; Interstate; US; State; Auto trails; Lettered highways
← SR 77	→ SR 86

State Route 85 (abbreviated SR 85) is an American road, part of Maine's system of numbered state highways, located in the southern central part of the state. It runs for eight miles (13 km), connecting U.S. Route 302 (US 302) and SR 35 in Raymond to SR 11 in Casco.

== Route description ==
SR 85 begins at US 302/SR 35 in southern Raymond. The highway heads north through town and passes along the west side of Crescent Lake. SR 85 crosses into Casco and immediately terminates at SR 11. Locally, it is known as Webbs Mills Road, for its terminus is located in Webbs Mills, a small village in Casco. The road almost directly parallels SR 121, and provides an alternate route to get to the Lake Region, and thus avoiding the traffic on US 302.

== Junction list ==
The entire route is in Cumberland County.

Location	mi	km	Destinations	Notes
Raymond	0.00	0.00	US 302 / SR 35 (Roosevelt Trail) – Naples, Windham	
Casco	7.98	12.84	SR 11 (Poland Spring Road) – Naples, Portland	
1.000 mi = 1.609 km; 1.000 km = 0.621 mi
