= Camp Fire (organization) =

American youth organization

- Headquarters: Kansas City, Missouri
- Country: United States
- Founded: informally 1910; formally March 17, 1912
- Founders: Luther Gulick, M.D.; Charlotte Gulick
- National Board Chair: Danette Andley
- CEO: Shawna Rosenzweig
- Website campfire.org

Camp Fire, formerly Camp Fire USA and originally Camp Fire Girls of America, is a co-ed youth development organization. Camp Fire was the first nonsectarian, multicultural organization for girls in America. It is now gender-inclusive, and its programs emphasize camping and other outdoor activities. Offshoots were formed in other countries, such as the British Camp Fire Girls' Association.

Its informal roots extend back to 1910, with efforts by Mrs. Charles Farnsworth in Thetford, Vermont, and Luther Gulick, M.D., and his wife, Charlotte Vedder Gulick, on Sebago Lake, near South Casco, Maine. Camp Fire Girls, as it was known at the time, was created as the sister organization to the Boy Scouts of America.

In 1975, the organization changed its name to Camp Fire Boys and Girls, when membership eligibility was expanded to include boys. In 2001, it adopted the name Camp Fire USA, and in 2012 it became Camp Fire.

Camp Fire's programs include small group experiences, after-school programs, camping, as well as environmental education, child care, and service-learning; they aim to build confidence in younger children and provide hands-on, youth-driven leadership experiences for older youth.

== History ==
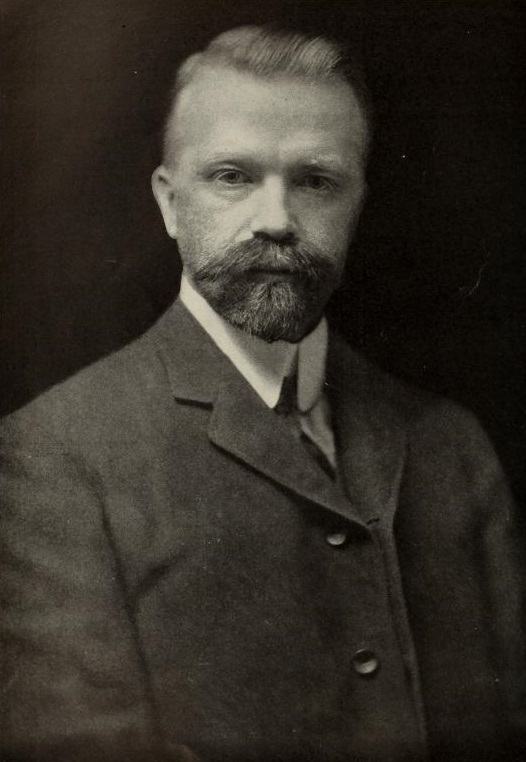
Photograph of Luther Gulick from The World's Work, 1909

In 1910, young girls in Thetford, Vermont, watched their brothers, friends, and schoolmates—all Boy Scouts—practice their parts in the community's 150th anniversary, which would be celebrated the following summer. The pageant's organizer, William Chauncy Langdon, promised the girls that they too would have an organized role in the pageant, although no organization similar to the Boy Scouts existed for girls at the time. Langdon consulted Mrs. Charles Farnsworth [Charlotte Joy (Allen) Farnsworth, known as "Madama" ], preceptress of a summer camp for Horace Mann School students near Thetford, Vermont. Both approached Luther Halsey Gulick M.D. about creating a national organization for girls. Gulick introduced the idea to friends, among them G. Stanley Hall, Ernest Thompson Seton, and James West, executive secretary of the Boy Scouts. After many discussions and help from Gulick and his wife Charlotte, Langdon named the group of Thetford girls the Camp Fire Girls.

In 1907, the Gulicks had established Camp WoHeLo, a camp for girls, on Lake Sebago, near South Casco, Maine. There were seventeen girls at the camp in the summer of 1910. Both the Vermont group and the Maine group would lead to the creation of the organization formally called Camp Fire Girls in 1912.

On March 22, 1911, Dr. Gulick organized a meeting "to consider ways and means of doing for the girls what the Boy Scout movement is designed to do for the boys." On April 10, 1911, James E. West issued a press release from the Boy Scouts of America headquarters announcing that with the success of the Boy Scout movement, a group of preeminent New York men and women were organizing a group to provide outdoor activities for girls, similar to those in the Boy Scouts.

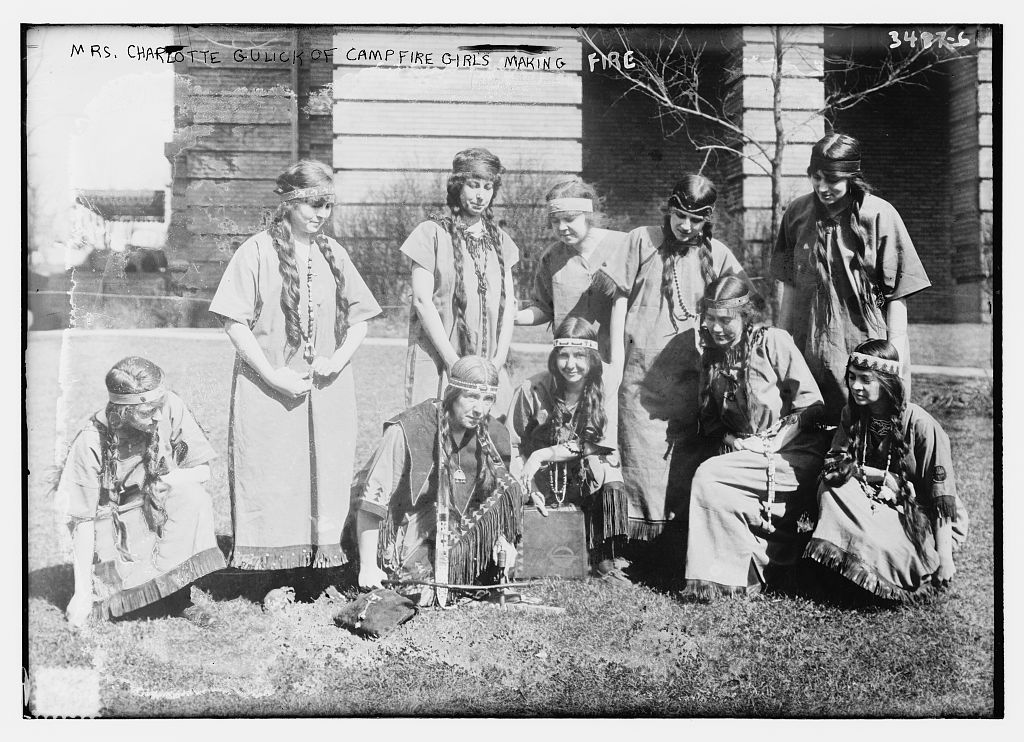
Mrs. Charlotte Gulick with Campfire Girls in 1915

In 1911, the Camp Fire Girls planned to merge with the Girl Scouts of America, formed by Clara A. Lisetor-Lane of Des Moines, Iowa, and Girl Guides of America (of Spokane, Washington) to form the Girl Pioneers of America, but relationships fractured and the merger failed. Grace Seton quit the group over the rejection of her committee's draft of a handbook, followed by Linda Beard in September 1911 over differences with the Gulicks. However, there was an organization meeting held by Lina Beard on February 7, 1912, in Flushing, New York, of a Girl Pioneers of America organization.

Camp Fire Girls of America was incorporated in Washington, D.C., as a national agency on March 17, 1912.

In late 1912, Juliette Gordon Low proposed that the Camp Fire Girls merge with her group, Girl Guides of America, but was rejected in January 1913 as the Camp Fire Girls were then the larger group. By December 1913, Camp Fire Girls' membership was an estimated 60,000, many of whom began attending affiliated summer camps. The Bluebird program was introduced that year for younger girls, offering an exploration of ideas and creative play built around family and community. In 1989, the Bluebirds became Starflight.

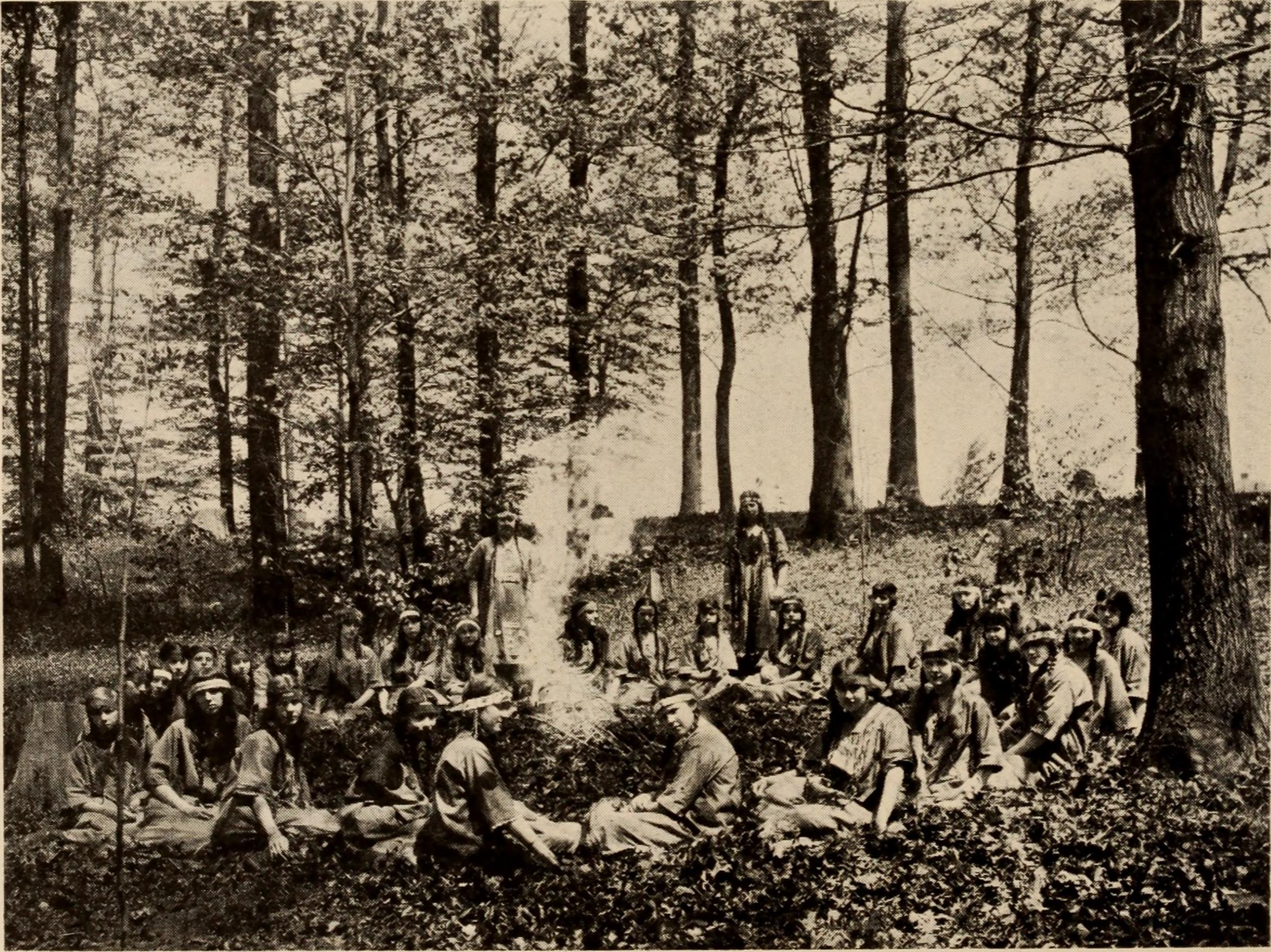
Flushing, New York, 1917

The first official Camp Fire Girls handbook was published in 1913. During World War I, Camp Fire Girls helped to sell over one million dollars in Liberty Bonds and over $900,000 in Thrift Stamps; 55,000 girls helped to support French and Belgian orphans, and an estimated 68,000 girls earned honors by conserving food.

The first local Camp Fire Girls council was formed in 1918 in Kansas City, Missouri. Kansas City would later become the national headquarters for Camp Fire in 1977.

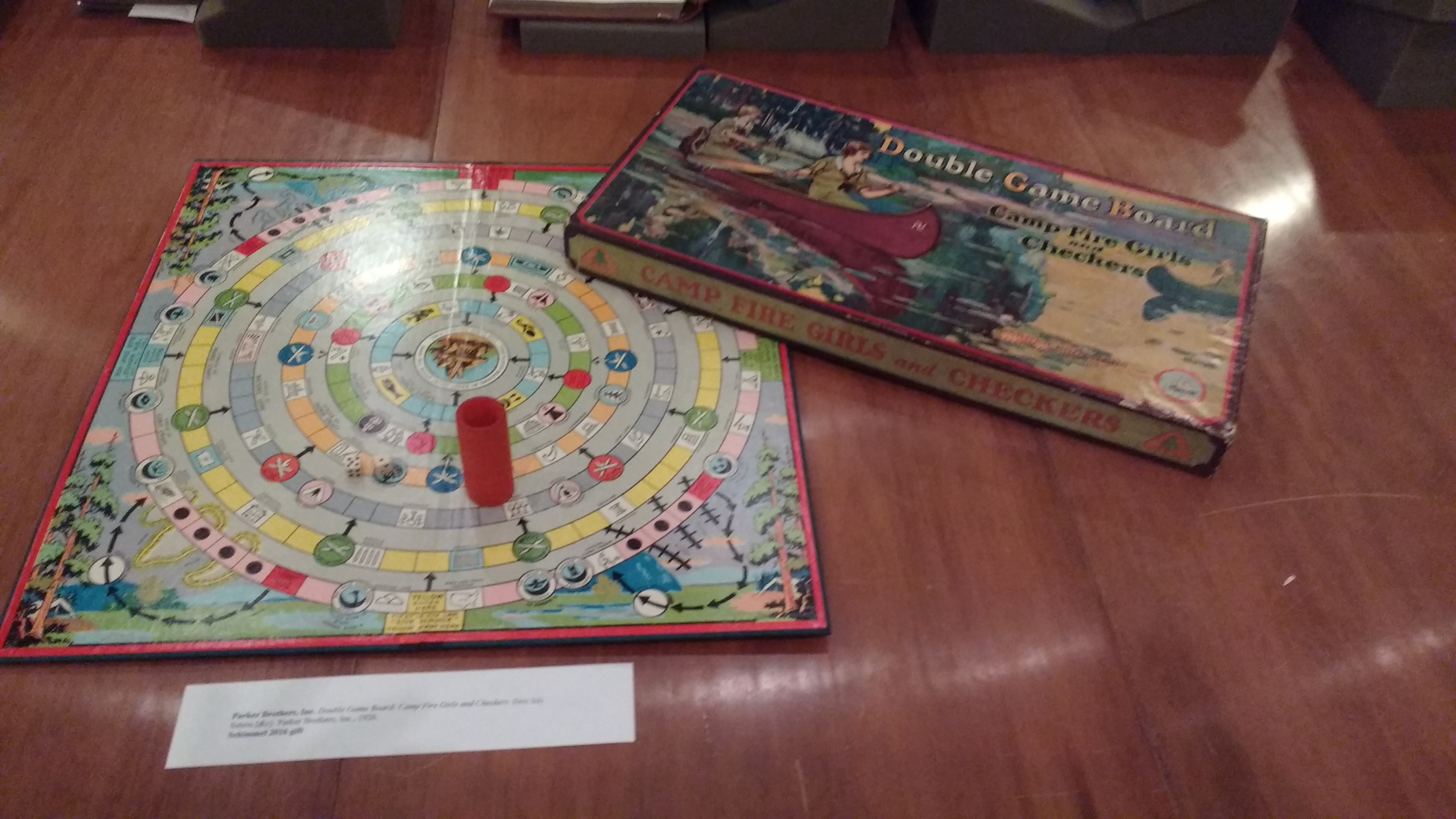
Double Game Board Camp Fire Girls and Checkers. Parker Brothers Inc.

In 1926, Parker Brothers produced a Camp Fire Girls board game. There were no turns in the game; everyone played at the same time. The game ended when someone entered the "Log Cabin Council Fire", which could only occur on an exact count. The winner of the game was the person who had collected the most "Honor Beads" on the way around the board (not necessarily the person who ended the game).

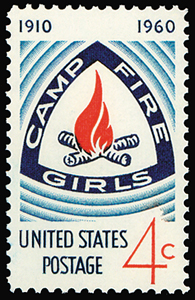
Camp Fire Stamp

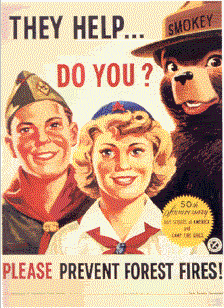
Smokey Bear with members of the Boy Scouts of America and the Camp Fire Girls celebrating the 50th anniversary of their founding.

Camp Fire Girls celebrated its 50th anniversary in 1960 with the "She Cares ... Do You?" program. During the project, Camp Fire Girls planted more than two million trees, built 13,000 birdhouses, and completed several other conservation-oriented tasks. To commemorate the 50th anniversary of the Camp Fire Girls, in connection with their Golden Jubilee Convention celebration, a stamp designed by H. Edward Oliver was issued featuring the Camp Fire Girls insignia. A new program, Junior Hi, where twelve- and thirteen-year-old girls explored new interests as a group and as individuals, was created in 1962. This program name changed later to Discovery. That same year, the WoHeLo medallion became Camp Fire's highest achievement and honor.

In 1969, Camp Fire Girls were allowed to be "Participants" in BSA's Explorer Posts (for boys 14 and older). This arrangement ended in 1971, when the BSA made Explorers a co-ed program. By 1974, Camp Fire's membership was at 274,000 in 1,300 communities of the United States. Camp Fire Girls expanded its horizons in 1975, welcoming boys to participate in all Camp Fire activities. While boys were invited to Camp Fire Girls Horizon Conferences in the late 1960s and early 1970s, official membership was not offered to them until 1975, when the organization became co-ed. Camp Fire decided that boys and girls should be together in one organization, so that they learn to play and work alongside each other and appreciate their similarities and differences in positive ways.

=== Camp Fire ===
In 1975, the Camp Fire Girls of America changed its membership policy to being co-ed and its name to Camp Fire Boys and Girls. In 1977, Camp Fire's head office moved to its current location in Kansas City from New York. Teens in Action was introduced in 1988 as a one-time social issue campaign to energize the older teen program.

The first Absolutely Incredible Kid Day, a call to action for all adults to communicate their love and commitment to children through letters, took place in 1997. In 2003, to further its commitment to inclusiveness, Camp Fire USA began translating its curricula to Spanish. As a way to excite and educate children in Pre-K, the Little Stars program, first developed by Camp Fire Green Country, was introduced nationally in 2005. Designated for ages 3–5, Little Stars aims to builds confidence and a sense of belonging in children.

In 2012, Camp Fire underwent a re-branding, changing the traditional flame logo changed to a more contemporary "Spark Mark."

== Programs ==
Camp Fire has nationally developed youth development programs that are delivered through local and statewide councils and community partners across the nation. Programs are specific to community needs and some may not be available in all communities. The five outcome-based program areas include: Small-Group Clubs and Mentoring Opportunities; Leadership Development; Camping and Environmental Education; Child Care; and Self-Reliance and Service–Learning Classes.

=== Small-group clubs ===
In Small-Group Clubs and Mentoring Opportunities, boys and girls usually meet once a week for an hour, learning to work and play together through service projects. Camp Fire has numerous youth-development programs that are delivered through local and statewide councils and community partners.

The program levels are:

- Little Stars is for children ages three through five, and provides parents and preschool youth with a program-driven playgroup that gives them the opportunity to learn, grow and play.
- Starflight is for boys and girls in kindergarten through second grade. The children meet regularly in adult-supervised clubs. Meeting activities focus on the outdoors, creativity, service, acquiring new skills, learning more about themselves, and getting along with others.
- Adventure is for boys and girls in third through fifth grade. Adventure members earn Action Crafts beads for the new things they do and the good habits they learn. At this level, youth begin to accept more responsibility for choosing and planning their club activities.
- Discovery is for sixth through eighth grades, giving young people an opportunity to explore new interesting fields. Club members do much of their own planning and decision making, with the adult leader functioning more as an advisor than a supervisor. This is when Camp Fire youth are eligible to make and wear ceremonial attire, often gowns or tunics, worn only at Camp Fire ceremonials.
- Horizon is for high school-age youth in grades nine through twelve. Members participate in self-guided programs geared toward preparing them for adult responsibilities and community service. Members may earn the WoHeLo Award.

=== Awards ===
Official national recognition items are one of Camp Fire's defining features, aimed to help children and adults build self-esteem and have pride in their accomplishments. For their participation, growth and achievements, youth receive items such as beads, emblems, pins, and certificates. At the early levels, Camp Fire leaders help youth choose activities and guide them in earning the recognition items. As teens, members select their own activities and develop their own action plans for earning recognition items.

For adults, recognition items signify outstanding achievement or the number of years they have been adult Camp Fire USA members. Adults in programming or board positions are recognized on the local level for their important roles in Camp Fire.

==== Beads ====
Youth are able to earn beads while completing projects on the "Camp Fire Trails" as well as emblems. Previously, once the participants earned ten of one type of bead, they were awarded a larger one of the same type to represent the ten smaller ones. By 2006, there was one bead for each of the Camp Fire Trails.

Bead colors

- Red – Sports, Games & Science – Trail to the Future
- Brown – Outdoors & Environment – Trail to Environment
- Green – Creativity – Trail to Creativity
- Yellow – Business & Home – Trail to Family and Community
- Royal Blue – (formerly Citizenship, discontinued in 2003)
- Red, White & Blue – (formerly Citizenship, replaced with Royal Blue in 2003)
- Orange – (formerly Home Craft, discontinued in 2003)
- Turquoise – (formerly Science – Trail to Knowing Me, discontinued in 2003)
- Lime Green – Discovery level
- Purple – (small beads) Special Projects

==== WoHeLo Award ====
Established in 1962, the WoHeLo Award is a medallion named for Camp Fire's watchword "WoHeLo". WoHeLo is derived from the words work, health, and love. Each year, approximately 200 Camp Fire youth throughout the nation receive the WoHeLo Award. A member may apply for the award after completing four major long-term projects called Reflections, and three self-selected projects, called Advocacies, dealing with an area of concern of the youth member's choosing. The first must be to Camp Fire; the second cannot be to Camp Fire; and the third can either be in Camp Fire or outside of Camp Fire. Each of the three Advocacies must involve leading, teaching, serving, and speaking out. Many councils have removed the requirement that Advocacies must be completed to the Camp Fire program, citing that opportunities do not always exist for members enrolled in all areas of the country. The third requirement for a Camp Fire WoHeLo Award is to "know Camp Fire". Youth are required to read the History of Camp Fire, tour the office of their council, or follow another approved method of understanding the services Camp Fire provides.

In 2004, the WoHeLo Award was expanded to Teens in Action members, allowing all high-school-aged Camp Fire members to work toward the award.

=== Service-Learning ===
Service Learning has always been a large part of the Camp Fire curriculum. In 2008–2009, Camp Fire councils engaged a total of 2,864 older youth in service learning projects, totaling over 108,852 hours of work with 116 community partners. Working with Learn and Serve America, 27 Camp Fire councils were able to get 1,731 teens to help over 70,300 youth and family members from low-income housing understand emergency preparedness. The Gift of Giving program, for grades K–8, is the nation's only organized and measurable introduction to service-learning. To date, over 100,000 children have participated in this program.

==== Teens in Action ====
The Teens in Action program is built on Camp Fire's tradition of recognizing youth as part of the solution to today's social challenges. Working together with young people, Teens in Action strives to improve the communities where youth live, to challenge them to learn new skills and provide leadership in areas never thought possible. Programs of this nature aim to inspire and honor community responsibility, contribute to the future of American volunteerism, and encourage a sense of caring for others.

The principles of Teens in Action are based on youth–adult partnerships and learning through empowering experiences. Its intent is to build strong ties between teens and their families, schools and communities, and to put a spotlight on issues of concern to youth. This program is based on the idea that young people are the key to the future and are making a difference in the world.

=== Hold on to Health ===
Hold on to Health is a Camp Fire program that helps to teach children to make healthy decisions regarding exercise and eating. It also encourages children to get their families and other youth involved in becoming healthy.

=== Camp and environmental education ===
Since Camp Fire's inception, it has been about getting girls out in the wilderness to learn. The Gulick family had formed Camp WoHeLo before they had the idea to start the Camp Fire Organization.

Camp Fire is the largest coeducational nonsectarian camp provider, operating more than 110 environmental and camp programs throughout the United States, and annually serving more than 34,000 school-age youth. Its outdoor experiences help children work in groups, make friends and build self-esteem, while learning about ecology, conservation and the interrelationships of all living things. The Camp Fire camping and environmental education experience teaches youth to work in teams and make friends, while building self-esteem and good decision-making skills.

A common Camp Fire approach is to let the youth decide on their activities, allowing them to feel a sense of ownership with their camp schedule and helping them to become more proactive. It is Camp Fire's belief that any program activity that the group does together is not as important or lasting as the effects of being with a group of peers and a supportive adult in an environment where they are able to share their feelings and learn from experience.

"The organization shall endeavor to aid in the formation of habits making for health and vigor, the out-of-door habit, and the out-of-door spirit." Luther Gulick

==== Counselor in Training program ====
The Counselor in Training (CIT) program is available to all youth over 16 years of age who have an interest in becoming a counselor. The CIT program provides youth with leadership skills, self-confidence, decision-making skills and camping basics. Camp Fire's CIT program and manual are frequently used by not only Camp Fire but also other organizations, and is approved by the American Camping Association.

=== Community Family Club ===
Community Family Club is a program designed by Camp Fire to provide developmental programs for the whole family. The goal is to include at least one adult family member or a supporting adult from the community with every child who attends. Siblings of all ages, infants through teens, are included. Community Family Clubs also provide opportunities to create strong partnerships with corporations, schools, faith-based communities, child care settings and other community organizations to advance the needs of children, youth, and families across the country. Families come together once a month to share a meal and participate in a recognition ceremony designed to recognize both individual and group accomplishments. The club then breaks into age-level groups for an activity session led by a team of parents who volunteer for the short-term assignment for that month. This program offers parents and guardians the ability to find a community support group for raising their families, and also provides positive family interaction base on structured, educational and fun experiences and activities.

=== Absolutely Incredible Kid Day ===
Started in 1997, Absolutely Incredible Kid Day (AIKD) is a national annual campaign in which adults write letters of love and support to the young people in their lives. This event is held the third Thursday of March, to correspond to the founding date of Camp Fire.

In previous years, Absolutely Incredible Kid Day developed a following, including athletes, entertainers, and celebrities who have championed the cause by writing letters to America's youth, including former presidents Bill Clinton George W. Bush, Oprah Winfrey, Pro Football Hall of Fame Inductee Jerry Rice, and astronaut and former Senator John Glenn. On social media, Absolutely Incredible Kid Day uses the hashtags #KidDay and #AIKD.

=== Past programs ===
==== Bluebirds, Blue Jays, Sparks ====
Many names have been used within Camp Fire to identify different age groups. For many years, Camp Fire's youngest elementary school members were known as Bluebirds.

In 1983, a club program for kindergarteners was introduced, called Sparks. In 1989, these two age groups were combined, and a new program level for kindergarten, first, and second graders called Starflight was created. The Little Stars program for pre-schoolers was added in 2005. The tradition of Bluebirds has been preserved as a Camp Fire mascot for all ages.

== Native American influence ==
Native American culture influenced the early years of Camp Fire, serving as the inspiration for ceremonial activities and attire, camp and council names, respect for nature and the environment, and the use of symbols by many councils. For Camp Fire, Native American symbolism was a natural outgrowth of an appreciation for differences and cultural inclusiveness. The theory was that such symbolism enabled—and even encouraged—self-reflection and personal growth.

=== Names ===
All Camp Fire members between third and sixth grade are encouraged to choose a name that best reflects their personality and aspirations. At this time they are also encouraged to choose a symbol or "symbolgram". Clubs are encouraged to choose a Native American name.

=== Ceremonial attire ===
Originally, the Camp Fire ceremonial gown was based on Native American women's gowns, and was made optional in 1946. Today, a member may choose any style of ceremonial attire, particularly if it honors their ethnic background, such as tunics, kimonos, and Scandinavian skirts/aprons. The ceremonial attire is decorated with honor beads, earned emblems, and other personal items the member chooses. Sometimes the youth's symbolgram, a symbol created by the youth to represent themself, is used on the ceremonial attire.

== In fiction and popular culture ==
Throughout the years, Camp Fire has appeared in many novels written for youth. Irene Ellion Benson wrote one of the first books to incorporate Camp Fire, called How Ethel Hollister Became a Campfire Girl, published in 1912. Benson published six more books about Camp Fire between 1912 and 1918. In 1913, Margaret Vandercook started the Camp Fire Girls series, which portrayed many of Camp Fire's activities, rituals, and ceremonies, including their summer camps. In the 1980s, Camp Fire was featured in the Carolyn Keene and Franklin Dixon's Nancy Drew and the Hardy Boys Camp Fire Stories. Laura Lee Hope also featured Camp Fire in a Bobbsey Twins book. In 1991, Archie Comics published a special Archie comic in celebration of Camp Fire's 75th anniversary with the Riverdale gang working as counselors there. British writers have also used Camp Fire and their rituals in British children's fiction—author Elsie J. Oxenham often mentioned Camp Fire in her Abbey Series. In 1915, Angela Brazil incorporated the Camp Fire League into one of her fictional girls' boarding schools, For the Sake of the School.

== Notable people ==
National Board of Trustees:

- Greg Zweber, President & CEO
- Jane Parker, Chair
- Stephen "Steve" C. Franke Jr., CPA, Treasurer
- Mara H. Cohara, Secretary
- McKenzie Napier, National Youth Advisory Cabinet Chair
- Melanie Lockwood Herman
- Lauren Lampe
- Rick Taylor
- Sonya Richburg
- Ken Schoeneck
- Jeanetta Darno
- Dave Albano

Senior Leadership:

- Greg Zweber, CEO
- Shawna Rosenzweig, President
- Erin Risner, Senior Director, Marketing and Communications
- Connie Dresie, Director, Council Support
- Chris Wagner, Director, Office Technology

Camp Fire Alumni:

- Marian Anderson
- Karen Batchelor
- Shirley Temple
- Beverly Cleary
- Savannah Guthrie
- Sheinelle Jones
- Lauren Graham
- Janis Joplin
- Gladys Knight
- Madonna
- Rita Moreno
- Patrice Munsel – TV spokeswoman for the Camp Fire Girls in the 1950s and 1960s

== See also ==
- Religious emblems programs
- Scouting in popular culture
