= John Robinson (Maine politician) =

American politician and businessperson

John C. Robinson (born October 17, 1972) is an American politician and businessperson from Maine. A Republican from Raymond, Maine, Robinson served in the Maine House of Representatives from 2004 to 2010. He moved out of the district and was superseded by fellow Republican Michael D. McClellan.
