= Bonnie Titcomb Lewis =

American politician

Bonnie Titcomb Lewis is an American politician from Maine. A Democrat from Casco, Maine, Lewis served 6 years in the Maine Senate (1988–1994). Lewis lost the 1994 Democratic primary for U.S. Congress to Dennis L. Dutremble of Biddeford.

In 2014, Titcomb Lewis, now a resident of Raymond, Maine is running for District 67 in the Maine House of Representatives.

Titcomb Lewis graduated from the University of Southern Maine with a B.S. in English and History.
