= Friends Meetinghouse (Casco, Maine) =

Historic church in Maine, United States

- U.S. National Register of Historic Places
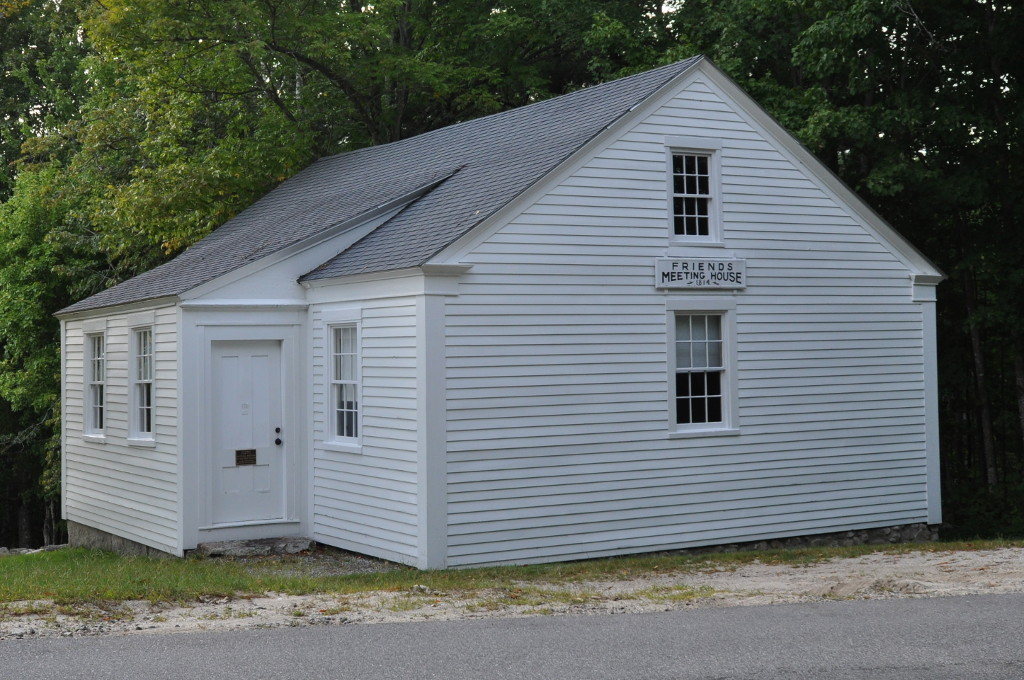

- Location within Maine Location within the United States
- Nearest city: Casco, Maine
- Coordinates: 43°58′12″N 70°31′56″W
- Area: 1 acre (0.40 ha)
- Built: 1814
- NRHP reference No.: 75000095
- Added to NRHP: September 09, 1975

Friends Meetinghouse is a historic Quaker meeting house on Quaker Ridge Road in Casco, Maine. Built in 1814, it is the oldest surviving Quaker meeting house in the state. It was listed on the National Register of Historic Places in 1975.

== Description and history ==
The Friends Meetinghouse is located in a rural area of central Casco, on the west side of Quaker Ridge Road, about 0.75 miles (1.21 km) south of Maine State Route 11. It is a modest single-story wood-frame structure, with a gable roof and narrow clapboard siding. A shed-roofed entrance vestibule projects from the left side of the building, its roof extending from roughly the midpoint of the main roof slope. The front facade has single sash windows at the main and attic levels. The interior of the main space is divided roughly in two, with a fixed partition wall that has openable shutters on its upper half; this was so that the sexes would be divided, according to Quaker custom, while allowing communication between the sides to take place. The space is furnished with high-backed bench pews and a small parlor organ.

The first Quaker Meetings were informal and widely spread throughout the southern part of Maine, with the first formal Meeting in Maine forming in 1730. Quakerism spread gradually into the interior of the State during the next 100 years. This meeting house was built in 1814. It served as the site of Casco's first town meeting, after it was separated from Raymond in 1841. Regular services ended in 1921, but the building has been used for annual or summer services since, primarily by summer residents.

== See also ==
- National Register of Historic Places listings in Cumberland County, Maine
