= Tony Montanaro =

American mime artist

Tony Montanaro (1927–2002) was a 20th-century American mime artist.

== Early years ==
Born in Paulsboro, New Jersey, on September 10, 1927, Montanaro earned a theater degree from Columbia University and began performing stock theater with actors such as Jason Robards and Jackie Cooper. After seeing Marcel Marceau's historic 1956 performance at New York's Phoenix Theatre, Montanaro flew to Paris to study under Marceau and Marceau's teacher, Etienne Decroux.

== Career ==
Montanaro had a long career of well-received performances in Europe and the United States. In 1962, he starred Off-Broadway in a one-man show called A Mime's Eye View at the Gramercy Arts Theatre. He designed and hosted the award-winning CBS-TV children's show Pretendo.

After performing and teaching around the world, Montanaro journeyed to another Paris – South Paris, Maine, where in 1972, he founded the Celebration Barn Theater, a theater and school of mime, improvisation, storytelling and other performing skills.

Celebration Barn alumni have gone on to careers in television, film and theater, including puppeteers with Sesame Street and The Muppet Show, writers for Between the Lions, hosting Dancing with the Stars, and as performers in Cirque du Soleil. Today, the Barn is an international residential center for theater training and creation, continuing Montanaro's legacy.

== Later years ==
In his later years, Montanaro continued to teach and direct at the Barn and at the renovated home and studios of he and his third wife, Karen Hurll Montanaro, in Casco, Maine. The couple also toured widely with their two-person show, The Montanaro-Hurll Theatre of Mime and Dance.

In 1995, the Montanaros wrote Mime Spoken Here: The Performer's Portable Workshop, a guide to the craft of mime, character work, and improvisation, and a pair of accompanying instructional videos.

Montanaro died at his home in Casco, on Friday, December 13, 2002.

In 2004, thirty-eight performers, all past students, came together for a series of concerts to honor their teacher. A 2006 film, Theatre & Inspiration, celebrates his life and contributions to the world of theatre.
