= Panther Pond =

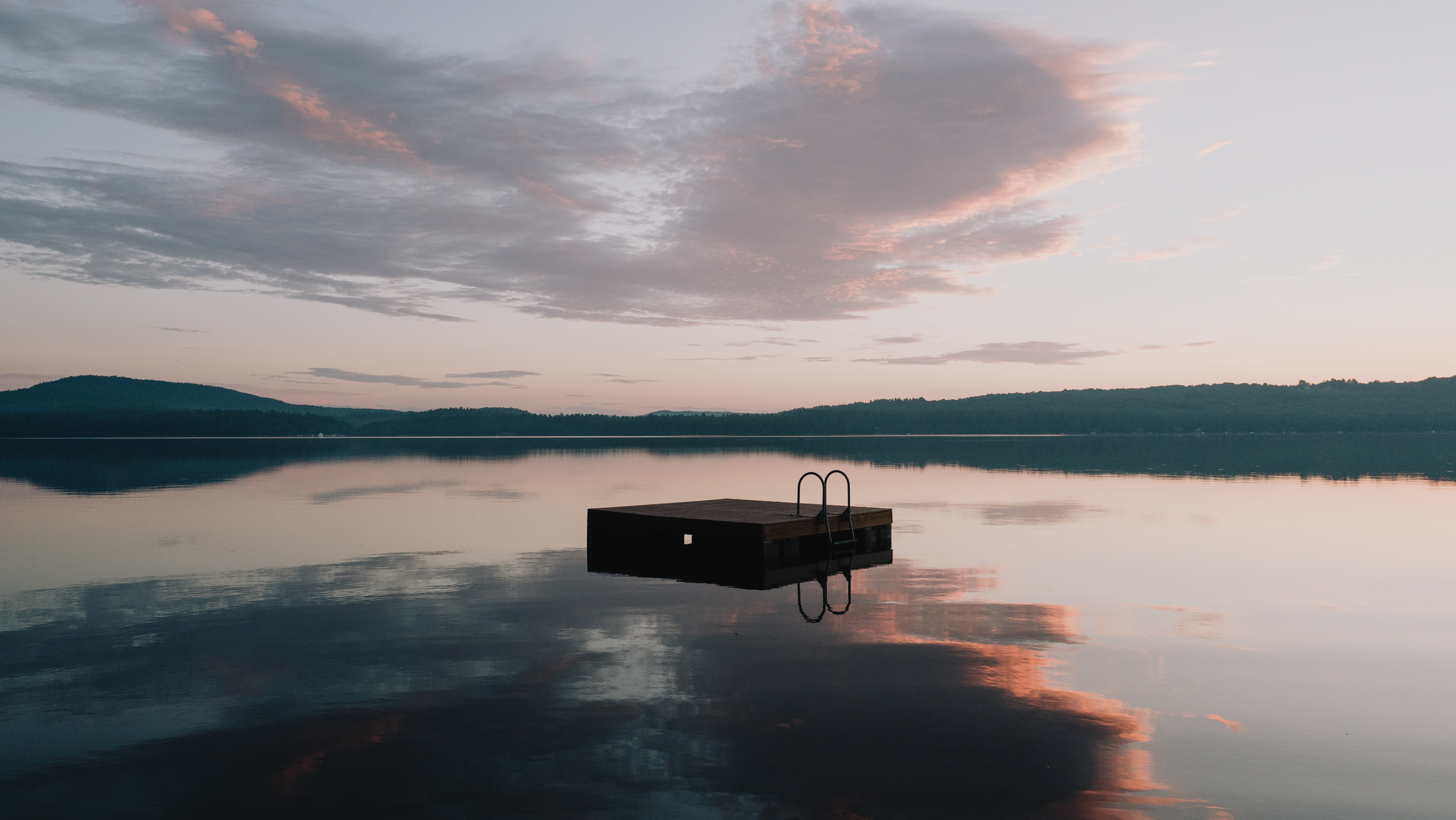

- Location within Maine Location within the United States
- Location: Raymond, Maine
- Coordinates: 43°55′34″N 70°28′05″W
- Type: Reservoir
- Basin countries: United States
- Max. length: 3 mi (4.8 km)
- Max. width: 1 mi (1.6 km)
- Max. depth: 70 ft (21 m)
- Surface elevation: 276 ft (84 m)

Panther Pond is a lake located in Raymond, Maine, in Cumberland County. Panther Pond is approximately 3 miles (4.8 km) long and 1 mile (1.6 km) wide. The deepest part of the lake is approximately 70 feet (21 m). Panther Pond is connected to two lakes. The first, the much larger Sebago Lake is connected by a run-out of Panther Pond named Panther Run. The connection between the two lakes are separated by a dam that is opened annually to let species of fish to flow through. The other lake, Crescent Lake, is connected to Panther Pond by the Tenny River.

== Fishing ==
Panther Pond contains different populations of fish, however warm water species of fish are better supported by the habitat. Panther Pond has both largemouth and smallmouth bass that are great to fish for in the summer months. Other species of fish include Landlocked Salmon, White Perch, Yellow Perch, Pickerel and Hornpout.
