= Casco, Maine =

Town in Maine, United States

- Town
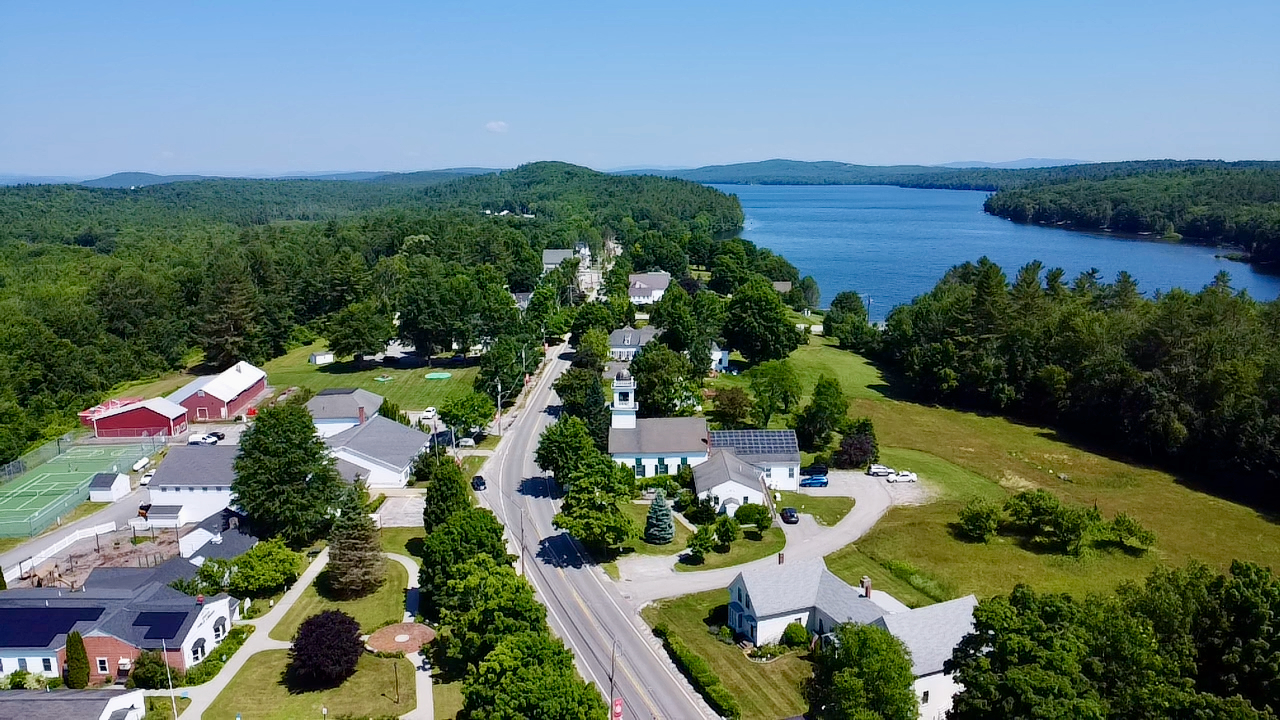
- Casco village from the air with Pleasant Lake in the background

- Logo

- Location in Cumberland County and the state of Maine.
- Coordinates: 43°58′40″N 70°30′22″W
- Country: United States
- State: Maine
- County: Cumberland
- Incorporated: 1841
- Villages: Casco; Cook Mills; Crescent Lake; Pike Corner; South Casco

Area
  - Total: 38.01 sq mi (98.45 km^{2})
  - Land: 31.24 sq mi (80.91 km^{2})
  - Water: 6.77 sq mi (17.53 km^{2})
- Elevation: 548 ft (167 m)

Population (2020)
  - Total: 3,646
  - Density: 117/sq mi (45.1/km^{2})
- Time zone: UTC−5 (Eastern (EST))
  - Summer (DST): UTC−4 (EDT)
- ZIP Codes: 04015 (Casco); 04077 (South Casco)
- Area code: 207
- FIPS code: 23-11125
- GNIS feature ID: 582395
- Website: cascomaine.org

Casco is a town in Cumberland County, Maine, United States. Casco is included in the Lewiston-Auburn, Maine metropolitan New England City and Town Area. The population was 3,646 at the 2020 census. Casco includes the villages of Casco, South Casco and Cook Mills. The town borders the east shore of Sebago Lake, and is home to part of Sebago Lake State Park. Casco is part of the Portland-South Portland-Biddeford metropolitan area. Casco is just under 30 miles (48 km) from downtown Portland.

Casco is the home of "Casco Days", an annual community fair which takes place in Casco Days Park, always on the last Saturday in July.

== History ==
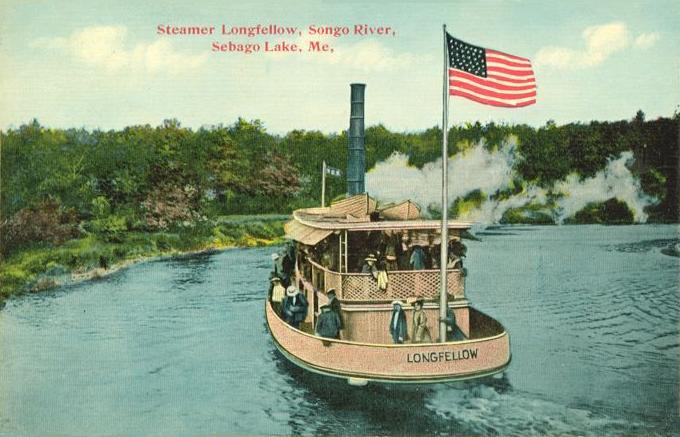
Steamer Longfellow on the Songo River in 1912

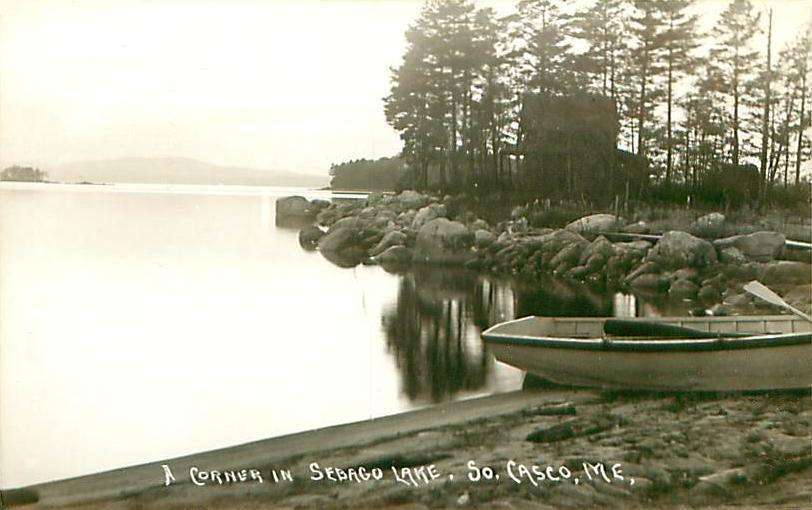
Sebago Lake c. 1915

On January 30, 1767, Raymondtown Plantation was granted by the Massachusetts General Court to Capt. William Raymond of Beverly, Massachusetts, and his company of soldiers for their service with Sir William Phipps in the 1690 Battle of Quebec. It replaced a 1735 grant called Beverly-Canada (now Weare, New Hampshire) which was ruled invalid in 1741 because of a prior claim by the heirs of John Mason. In 1803, Raymondtown Plantation was incorporated as Raymond. The town of Naples was created with land taken in 1838, the same year the western half of Raymond petitioned the legislature to be set off as a township because of its geographical separation behind Rattlesnake Mountain. The petition failed, but three years later another was accepted. On March 18, 1841, Casco was incorporated as a town.

Historical population
| Census | Pop. | Note | %± |
|---|---|---|---|
| 1850 | 1,046 | | — |
| 1860 | 1,116 | | 6.7% |
| 1870 | 998 | | −10.6% |
| 1880 | 908 | | −9.0% |
| 1890 | 844 | | −7.0% |
| 1900 | 783 | | −7.2% |
| 1910 | 688 | | −12.1% |
| 1920 | 685 | | −0.4% |
| 1930 | 713 | | 4.1% |
| 1940 | 890 | | 24.8% |
| 1950 | 881 | | −1.0% |
| 1960 | 947 | | 7.5% |
| 1970 | 1,256 | | 32.6% |
| 1980 | 2,243 | | 78.6% |
| 1990 | 3,018 | | 34.6% |
| 2000 | 3,469 | | 14.9% |
| 2010 | 3,742 | | 7.9% |
| 2020 | 3,646 | | −2.6% |
U.S. Decennial Census

Farmers found the surface of the town uneven, its hard and rocky soil "tolerably productive." Outlets of ponds, however, provided Casco with good sites for water powered mills. The town had four sawmills, four gristmills, a shook mill, a barrel stave mill, four shingle factories, a carriage factory and a tannery. In 1832, the Cumberland and Oxford Canal made Sebago Lake a direct trade route to Portland. Steamboat travel commenced on the waterways in the 1840s, carrying tourists and freight. In 1938, Sebago Lake State Park was established, one of the state's five original state parks.

== Geography ==
According to the United States Census Bureau, the town has a total area of 38.01 square miles (98.45 km^{2}), of which 31.24 square miles (80.91 km^{2}) is land and 6.77 square miles (17.53 km^{2}) is water. Casco is drained by the Crooked River and Songo River.

The town is crossed by U.S. Route 302 and state routes 11, 85 and 121. It is bordered by the town of Raymond to the southeast, Naples and Otisfield to the northwest, and Poland to the northeast. The village of Casco, a census-designated place, is located along Route 121 near the northern corner of town. South Casco is located along US 302 between Sebago Lake and Thomas Pond in the southeast corner of the town, and Cook Mills is located along Route 11 near the western border of the town.

== Demographics ==
=== 2010 census ===
As of the census of 2010, there were 3,742 people, 1,554 households, and 1,041 families living in the town. The population density was 119.8 inhabitants per square mile (46.3/km^{2}). There were 2,944 housing units at an average density of 94.2 per square mile (36.4/km^{2}). The racial makeup of the town was 97.0% White, 0.7% African American, 0.3% Native American, 0.3% Asian, 0.2% from other races, and 1.5% from two or more races. Hispanic or Latino of any race were 1.2% of the population.

There were 1,554 households, of which 29.7% had children under the age of 18 living with them, 51.4% were married couples living together, 10.6% had a female householder with no husband present, 5.0% had a male householder with no wife present, and 33.0% were non-families. 25.0% of all households were made up of individuals, and 11.5% had someone living alone who was 65 years of age or older. The average household size was 2.41 and the average family size was 2.82.

The median age in the town was 42.6 years. 21.5% of residents were under the age of 18; 6.3% were between the ages of 18 and 24; 25.9% were from 25 to 44; 31.8% were from 45 to 64; and 14.7% were 65 years of age or older. The gender makeup of the town was 49.4% male and 50.6% female.

=== 2000 census ===
As of the census of 2000, there were 3,469 people, 1,327 households, and 958 families living in the town. The population density was 110.9 inhabitants per square mile (42.8/km^{2}). There were 1,958 housing units at an average density of 62.6 per square mile (24.2/km^{2}). The racial makeup of the town was 97.95% White, 0.29% African American, 0.37% Native American, 0.52% Asian, 0.12% from other races, and 0.75% from two or more races. Hispanic or Latino of any race were 0.52% of the population.

There were 1,327 households, out of which 34.1% had children under the age of 18 living with them, 58.3% were married couples living together, 10.4% had a female householder with no husband present, and 27.8% were non-families. 20.4% of all households were made up of individuals, and 6.8% had someone living alone who was 65 years of age or older. The average household size was 2.58 and the average family size was 2.96.

In the town, the population was spread out, with 25.2% under the age of 18, 6.5% from 18 to 24, 32.1% from 25 to 44, 24.7% from 45 to 64, and 11.4% who were 65 years of age or older. The median age was 38 years. For every 100 females, there were 97.7 males. For every 100 females age 18 and over, there were 94.3 males.

The median income for a household in the town was $41,629, and the median income for a family was $49,500. Males had a median income of $31,679 versus $25,306 for females. The per capita income for the town was $19,306. About 5.3% of families and 8.1% of the population were below the poverty line, including 8.5% of those under age 18 and 9.8% of those age 65 or over.

== Transportation ==
Casco is home to several important roads, both locally and nationally.

- Maine State Route 11: The longest state highway in Maine, Route 11 has been the long-time throughway for trucks, particularly lumber trucks. Route 11 is known locally as Poland Springs Road.
- Maine State Route 35: Route 35 parallels Route 302 for its entirety of the Casco region. Upon arriving in Naples, 35 runs north along Long Lake towards Harrison.
- Maine State Route 85: Known locally as Webbs Mills Road, Route 85 is just under 8 miles (13 km). It connects Route 302 and Route 11. The route begins on the Northeast corner of Sebago Lake, runs through the town of Raymond, and then terminates at Route 11.
- Maine State Route 121: Known locally as Meadow Road, Route 121 begins at Route 302 on the northeast corner of Sebago Lake. It intersects Route 11 just south of downtown Casco, and then continues into downtown Casco.
- US Route 302: Known locally as Roosevelt Trail, Route 302 is the main street of the lakes region. It provides a direct thruway to Portland, and many other large towns in Maine.

== Sites of interest ==
- Raymond-Casco Historical Society, Museum at Watkins Farm on Route 302 in Casco
- Nathaniel Hawthorne's boyhood home in Raymond
- Sebago Lake State Park
- Netop Summer Camp
- Seeds of Peace international camp
- Camp Laurel South, the most expensive four-week summer camp in the United States
- Camp Cedar
- Point Sebago Resort

== Notable people ==
- Luther Gulick, physician, member of Basketball Hall of Fame
- William LeMessurier, structural engineer
- Bonnie Titcomb Lewis, state legislator
- Tony Montanaro, mime artist
- Susan Augusta Pike Sanders, teacher, clubwoman, author
