= Raymond, Maine =

Town in Maine, United States

- Town
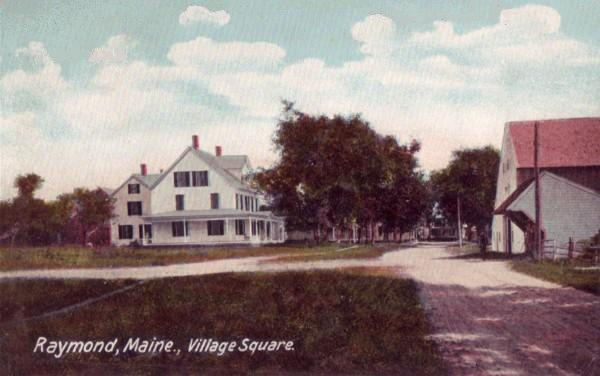
- Village square in 1906

- Location in Cumberland County and the state of Maine
- Coordinates: 43°55′35″N 70°26′25″W
- Country: United States
- State: Maine
- County: Cumberland
- Incorporated: 1803
- Villages: Raymond; East Raymond; North Raymond

Area
  - Total: 44.75 sq mi (115.90 km^{2})
  - Land: 33.18 sq mi (85.94 km^{2})
  - Water: 11.57 sq mi (29.97 km^{2})
- Elevation: 272 ft (83 m)

Population (2020)
  - Total: 4,605
  - Density: 137/sq mi (52.8/km^{2})
- Time zone: UTC-5 (Eastern (EST))
  - Summer (DST): UTC-4 (EDT)
- ZIP code: 04071
- Area code: 207
- FIPS code: 23-61945
- GNIS feature ID: 582692
- Website: www.raymondmaine.gov

Raymond is a town in Cumberland County, Maine, United States. Raymond is included in the Lewiston-Auburn, Maine, metropolitan New England City and Town Area. The population was 4,536 at the 2020 census. It is a summer recreation area and is part of the Portland–South Portland–Biddeford metropolitan statistical area. Raymond Neck is the landing for the ferry to the town of Frye Island in Sebago Lake. The Raymond school system is currently affiliated with the Windham school system in a district known as RSU 14.

== History ==
Raymondtown Plantation was granted in 1767 by the Massachusetts General Court to the descendants of Captain William Raymond (or Rayment) of Beverly, Massachusetts, and his militia. It was the second attempt to repay the troop (or heirs) for service under Governor Sir William Phipps during the Battle of Quebec in 1690. A township had been awarded them in 1735 called Beverly-Canada (now Weare, New Hampshire), but in 1741 descendants of John Mason proved a prior claim.

The township at Sebago Lake was given to the Beverly Proprietors as compensation. It was first settled in 1770 by Captain Joseph Dingley and Dominicus Jordan of Cape Elizabeth, although most families arrived after the Revolutionary War. It was on the stage route to Bridgton. On June 21, 1803, the Raymondtown Plantation was incorporated as Raymond, named in honor of Captain Raymond. In 1829, land was annexed to help form the new town of Naples, and in 1841, Casco was set off and incorporated as a town.

The town provided agriculture and lumber products for Portland and other cities. Panther Run, which drains Panther Pond, provided water power for industry. Raymond village grew near the mills, which included a gristmill, sawmill, plaster mill, a stave factory and a children's sled factory. From about 1812 until 1825, Nathaniel Hawthorne lived in Raymond with his siblings and widowed mother. His later writings would reminisce about his boyhood hiking in the woods or fishing in the lake.

Automobile tourists discovered Raymond after designation of the Theodore Roosevelt International Highway in 1919 (identified as United States Route 302 since 1935).

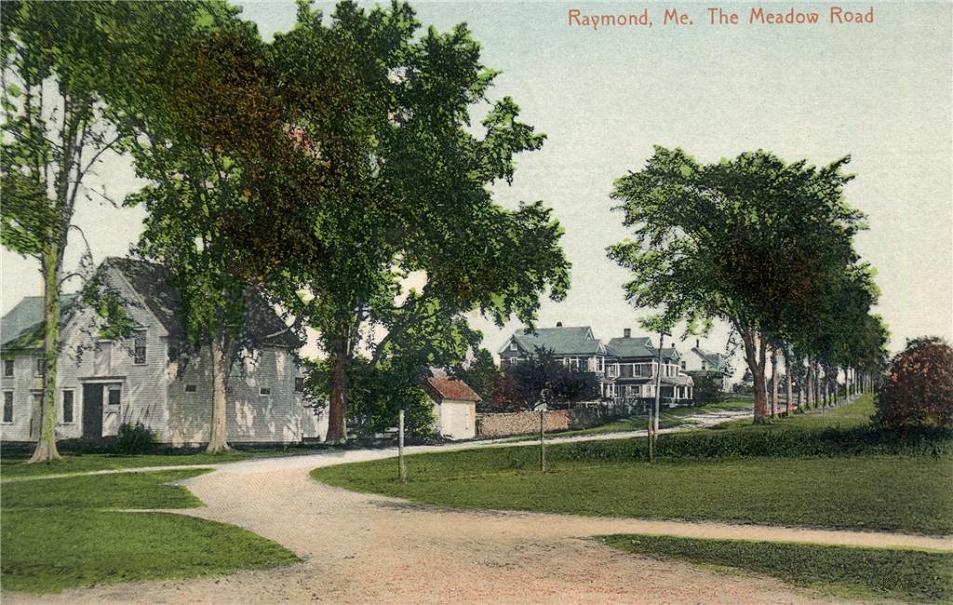
Meadow Road c. 1909

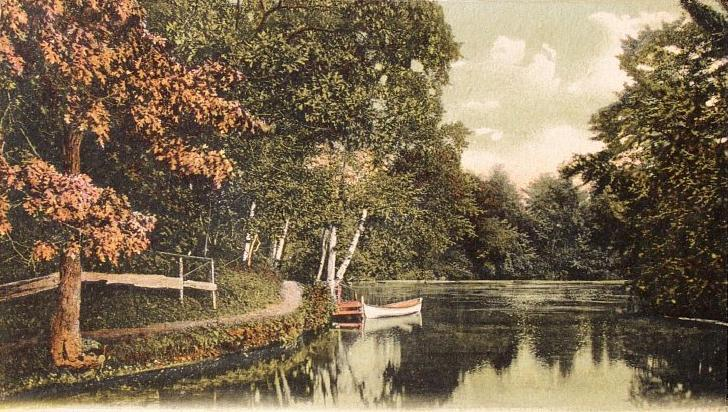
Jordan River in 1906

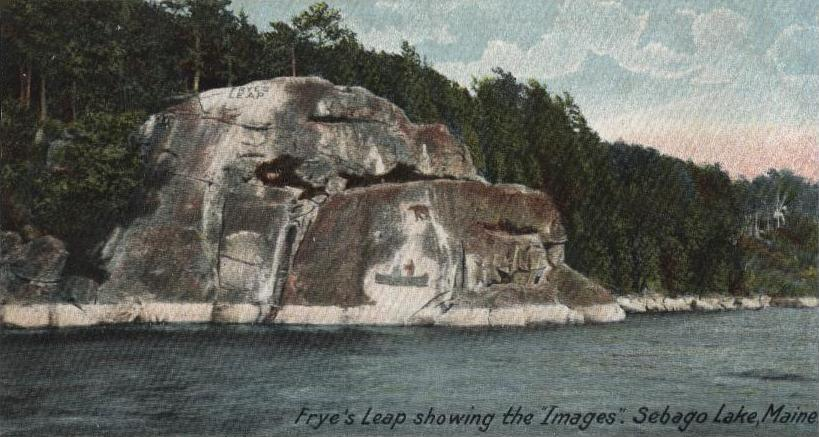
Frye's Leap c. 1905

== Geography ==
According to the United States Census Bureau, the town has a total area of 44.75 square miles (115.90 km^{2}), of which 33.18 square miles (85.94 km^{2}) is land and 11.57 square miles (29.97 km^{2}) is water. Raymond village is located at the head of Jordan Bay on Sebago Lake.

The town is served by U.S. Route 302 and state routes 85 and 121. It is bordered by Gray and Windham to the southeast, Casco to the northwest, and New Gloucester and Poland to the northeast. Frye Island is to the south in Sebago Lake.

== Demographics ==
Historical population
Census	Pop.	Note	%±
1800	438		—
1810	826		88.6%
1820	1,388		68.0%
1830	1,756		26.5%
1840	2,032		15.7%
1850	1,142		−43.8%
1860	1,229		7.6%
1870	1,120		−8.9%
1880	1,132		1.1%
1890	927		−18.1%
1900	823		−11.2%
1910	677		−17.7%
1920	500		−26.1%
1930	446		−10.8%
1940	506		13.5%
1950	620		22.5%
1960	732		18.1%
1970	1,328		81.4%
1980	2,251		69.5%
1990	3,311		47.1%
2000	4,299		29.8%
2010	4,436		3.2%
2020	4,536		2.3%
U.S. Decennial Census

=== 2010 census ===
As of the census of 2010, there were 4,436 people, 1,773 households, and 1,289 families living in the town. The population density was 133.7 inhabitants per square mile (51.6/km^{2}). There were 2,852 housing units at an average density of 86.0 per square mile (33.2/km^{2}). The racial makeup of the town was 97.2% White, 0.4% African American, 0.4% Native American, 0.3% Asian, 0.1% Pacific Islander, 0.2% from other races, and 1.5% from two or more races. Hispanic or Latino of any race were 0.9% of the population.

There were 1,773 households, of which 31.6% had children under the age of 18 living with them, 60.2% were married couples living together, 8.7% had a female householder with no husband present, 3.8% had a male householder with no wife present, and 27.3% were non-families. 19.9% of all households were made up of individuals, and 8.4% had someone living alone who was 65 years of age or older. The average household size was 2.50 and the average family size was 2.87.

The median age in the town was 44.6 years. 22% of residents were under the age of 18; 6.9% were between the ages of 18 and 24; 21.9% were from 25 to 44; 36% were from 45 to 64; and 13.2% were 65 years of age or older. The gender makeup of the town was 48.9% male and 51.1% female.

=== 2000 census ===
As of the census of 2000, there were 4,299 people, 1,616 households, and 1,255 families living in the town. The population density was 129.3 people per square mile (49.9/km^{2>}). There were 2,534 housing units at an average density of 76.2 per square mile (29.4/km^{2>}). The racial makeup of the town was 98.39% White, 0.40% African American, 0.30% Native American, 0.26% Asian, 0.02% Pacific Islander, 0.07% from other races, and 0.56% from two or more races. Hispanic or Latino of any race were 0.60% of the population.

There were 1,616 households, of which 37.9% had children under the age of 18 living with them, 64.7% were married couples living together, 8.8% had a female householder with no husband present, and 22.3% were non-families. 15.7% of all households were made up of individuals, and 4.8% had someone living alone who was 65 years of age or older. The average household size was 2.66 and the average family size was 2.96.

In the town, the population was spread out, with 26.4% under the age of 18, 6.1% from 18 to 24, 31.5% from 25 to 44, 25.7% from 45 to 64, and 10.4% who were 65 years of age or older. The median age was 38 years. For every 100 females, there were 97.4 males. For every 100 females age 18 and over, there were 95.9 males.

The median income for a household in the town was $52,224, and the median income for a family was $56,118. Males had a median income of $35,962 versus $30,662 for females. The per capita income for the town was $25,193. About 3.4% of families and 4.0% of the population were below the poverty line, including 3.8% of those under age 18 and 4.0% of those age 65 or over.

== Sites of interest ==
- Hawthorne House, Hawthorne Community Association
- WGME-TV transmitter & WGME News 13 Skycam location
- Raymond is the site of the annual World Series of Fizzbin

== Notable people ==
- Joseph Bruno, state legislator
- Kirsten Clark, US Olympic skier
- Jessica Fay, state legislator
- Nathaniel Hawthorne, author
- Bonnie Titcomb Lewis, state legislator
- John Robinson, state legislator

== See also ==
- Crescent Lake
