= Interstate 95 in Maine =

Section of Interstate Highway in Maine, United States

Interstate 95
- I-95 highlighted in red

Route information
- Maintained by MaineDOT and MTA
- Length: 303.00 mi (487.63 km)
- Existed: 1956–present
- NHS: Entire route

Major junctions
- South end: I-95 at the New Hampshire state line in Kittery
- I-195 in Saco; I-295 in Scarborough; I-495 in Portland; US 202 / SR 4 / SR 115 in Gray; I-295 in West Gardiner; US 202 / SR 11 / SR 17 / SR 100 in Augusta; US 201 in Fairfield; I-395 / US 2 / SR 15 / SR 100 in Bangor; US 1 in Houlton; US 2 in Houlton
- North end: Route 95 at the Houlton–Woodstock Border Crossing in Houlton

Location
- Country: United States
- State: Maine
- Counties: York, Cumberland, Androscoggin, Kennebec, Somerset, Waldo, Penobscot, Aroostook

Highway system
- Interstate Highway System; Main; Auxiliary; Suffixed; Business; Future; Maine State Highway System; Interstate; US; State; Auto trails; Lettered highways
← SR 94	→ SR 95

Interstate 95 (I-95) is a part of the Interstate Highway System that runs north–south from Miami, Florida to Houlton, Maine. The highway enters Maine from the New Hampshire state line in Kittery and runs for 303 miles (488 km) to the Canadian border at Houlton. It is the only primary Interstate Highway in Maine. In 2004, the highway's route between Portland and Gardiner was changed so that it encompasses the entire Maine Turnpike (including the former I-495 between Falmouth and Gardiner), a toll road running from Kittery to Augusta. As an Interstate Highway, all of I-95 in Maine is included in the National Highway System.

== Route description ==
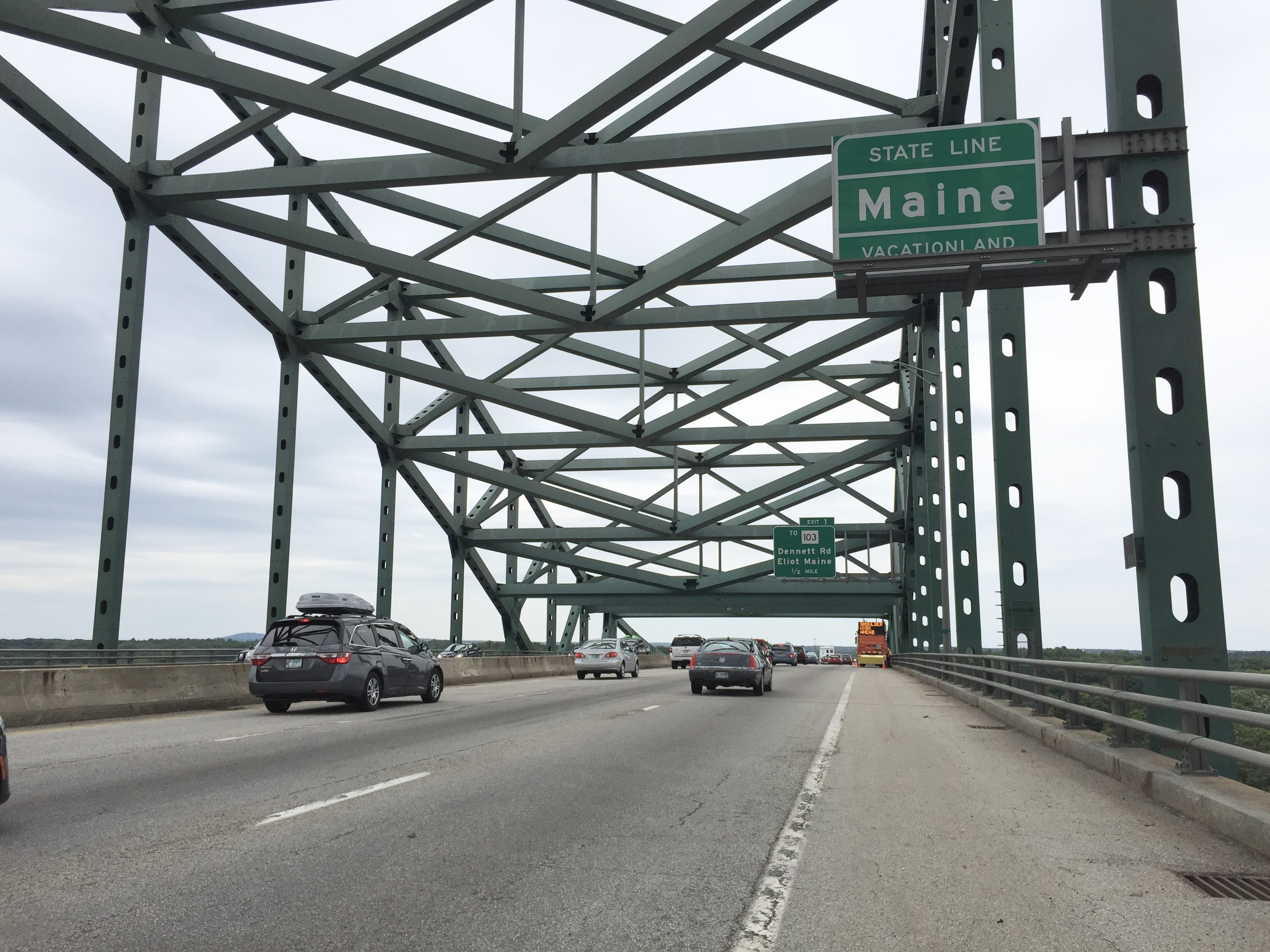
Entering Maine from New Hampshire on the Piscataqua River Bridge

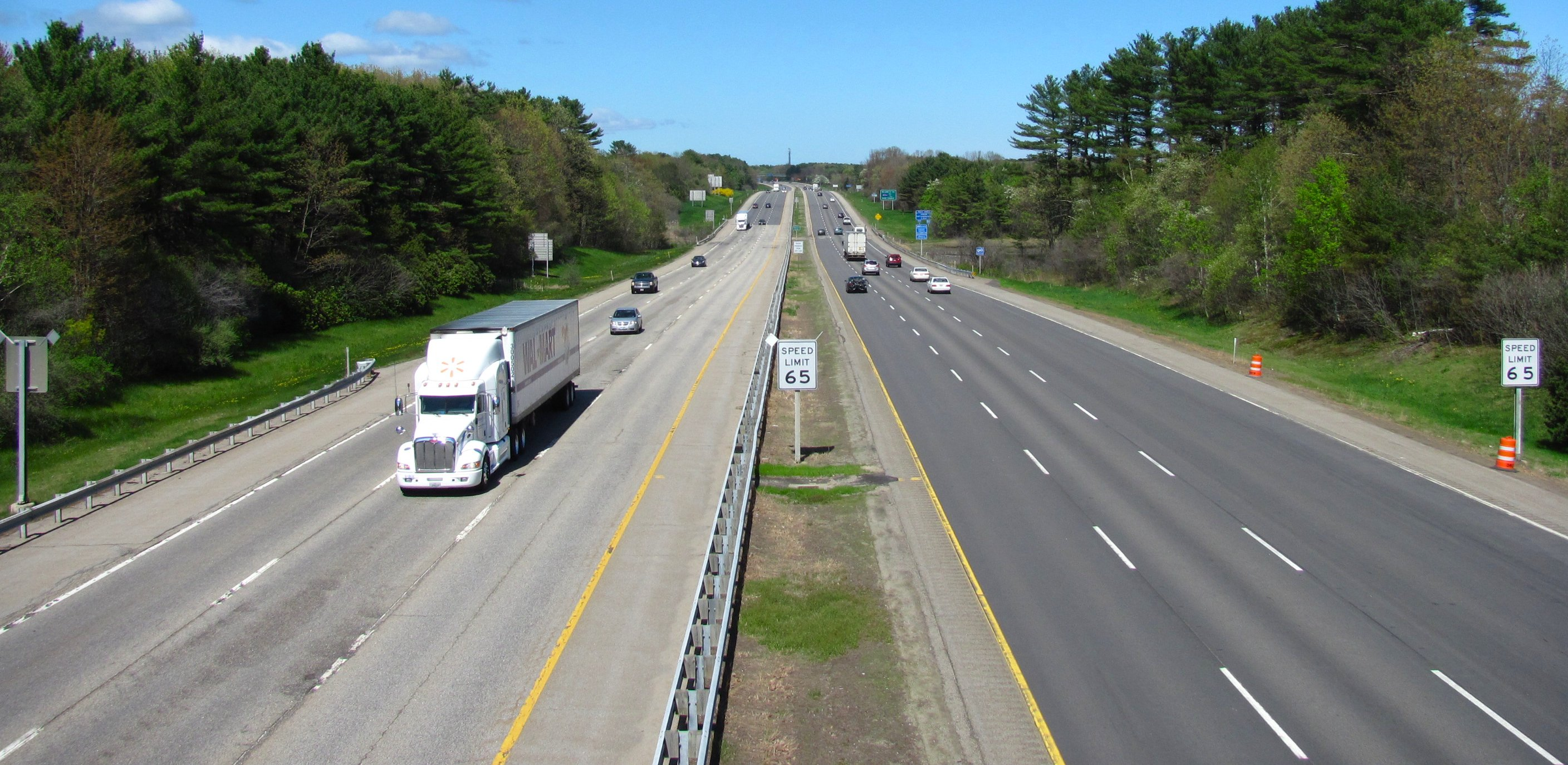
Northbound in Kittery

I-95 enters Maine as a six-lane highway from New Hampshire on the Piscataqua River Bridge, which connects Portsmouth, New Hampshire, with Kittery. At mile 0.38, the highway becomes the Maine Turnpike. The highway runs in a general northeasterly direction, parallel with US Route 1 (US 1), at this point. I-95 bypasses the Biddeford/Saco area, with a spur route, I-195, connecting to Old Orchard Beach. A curious wayside within Kennebunk around mile 28 is the historic 19th century Mitchell-Hatch family cemetery, which predates the interstate by 150 years and sits only a mere three feet from the rightmost lane of the northbound route. The cemetery was too controversial to relocate, and as such was left in its place as the turnpike came to expand to the very edge of the burial ground.

I-295 splits eastward from I-95 at mile 44 in Scarborough toward Portland Downtown, and Maine's Midcoast region. At this point, I-95 turns inland to the north, bypassing Portland Downtown while providing access to Portland International Jetport. I-95 narrows from six lanes to four lanes at mile 49 near the Portland-Falmouth border. At mile 53 in Falmouth, the highway meets unsigned I-495, also called the Falmouth Spur. Until January 2004, I-95 followed the Falmouth Spur and I-295 between Falmouth and Gardiner.

Interstate 495
- Location: Portland–West Gardiner
- Length: 50.38 mi (81.08 km)
- Existed: 1988–2004

I-95 continues north along its concurrency with the Maine Turnpike (which was I-495 prior to 2004) through Gray to Auburn and Lewiston, bypassing the latter two cities to the south. The highway then runs in an easterly direction to meet the northern terminus of I-295 at Gardiner. From there, I-95 parallels the Kennebec River past Augusta and Waterville. The highway then crosses the river at Fairfield and then turns northeast along the Sebasticook River past Pittsfield to Newport.

I-95 then continues east alongside US 2 from Newport to Bangor, where I-395 connects to the city of Brewer. The highway runs along the northern edge of Bangor's center, then turns northeast, following the Penobscot River past Orono and Old Town. (Prior to the early 1980s, I-95 was a super two highway north of Old Town).

The highway continues north, still running near the river, toward Howland. Near Lincoln, I-95 runs north through uninhabited forest land, crossing the Penobscot River at Medway. The highway goes northeast and east, passing a series of small Aroostook County farming towns before reaching Houlton, where it connects to US 2; the Interstate becomes New Brunswick Route 95 at the Houlton–Woodstock Border Crossing, also at the Canadian border. North of Bangor, traffic levels drop noticeably, with an annual average daily traffic of only about 5,000 in northern Penobscot County and going down to as low as 2,000 to 4,000 in Houlton.

== History ==
Maine Turnpike
- Location: Kittery–Augusta
- Length: 107.222 mi (172.557 km)
- Existed: 1947–present

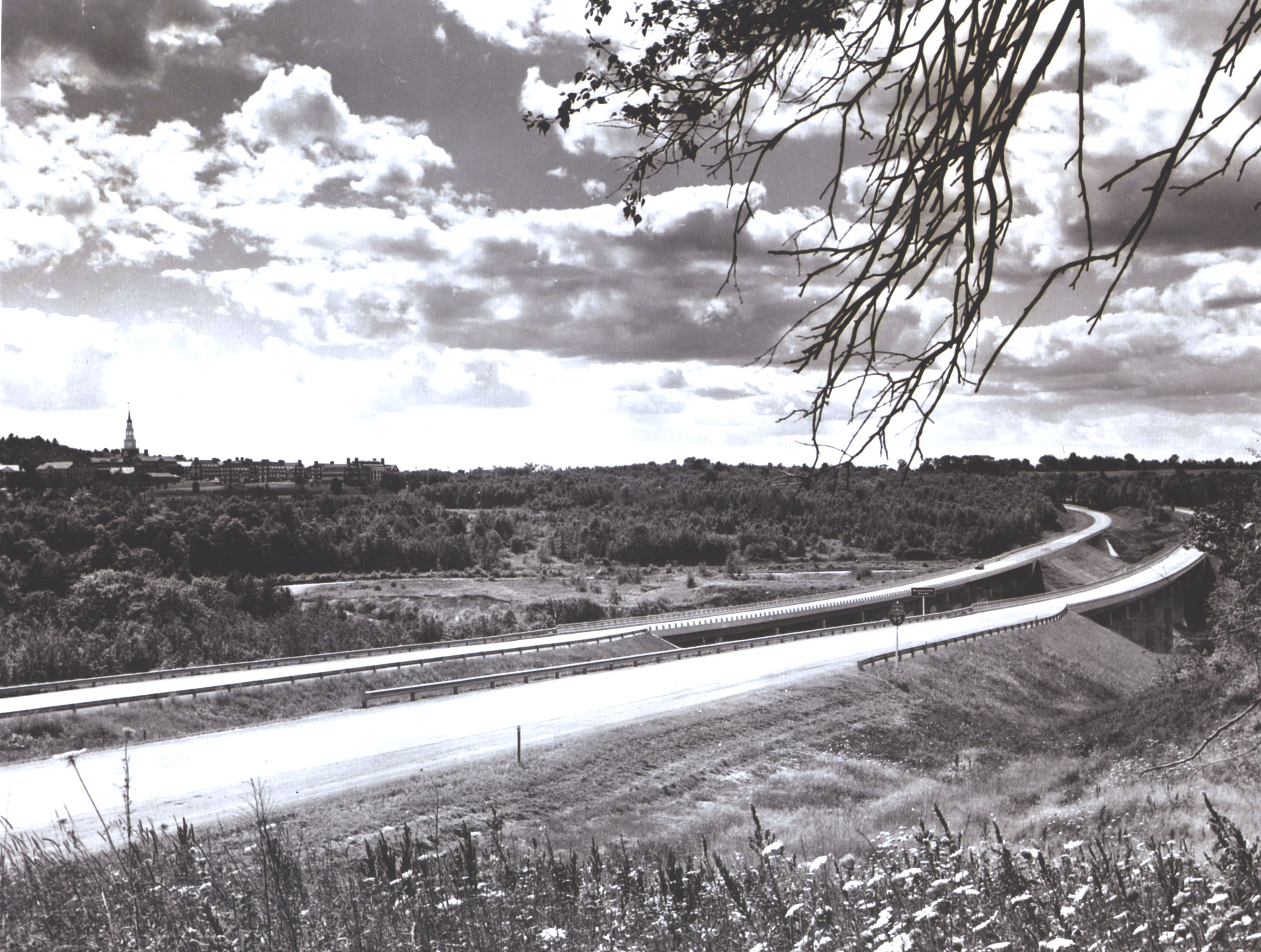
Interstate 95 crossing Messalonskee Stream in Waterville, Maine. Colby College can be seen in the background.

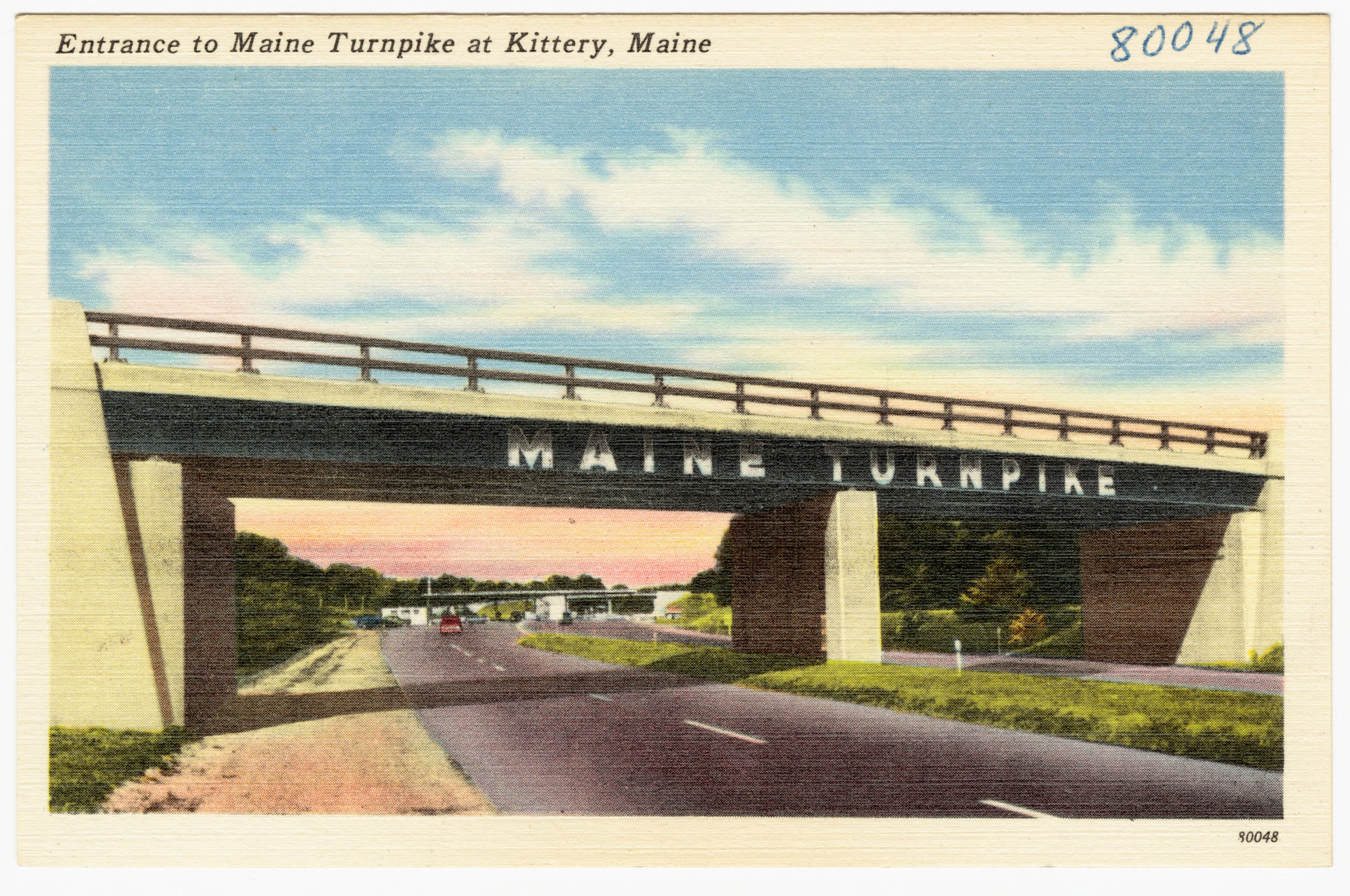
Early postcard showing entrance at Kittery

The Maine Turnpike Authority (MTA) was created by the Maine Legislature in 1941 to build and operate a toll highway connecting Kittery and Fort Kent. In 1947, the first section of highway, designated the Maine Turnpike, opened between Kittery and Portland. In 1953, the MTA began construction on an extension to the state capital at Augusta using the former right-of-way of the Portland–Lewiston Interurban railway from Portland through West Falmouth. The original turnpike was the largest construction project in the state's history until the construction of the extension, which opened to the public on December 13, 1955.

The Maine Turnpike was the first highway in the nation that was funded using revenue bonds. It remains self-financed and does not receive funding from the state or federal government. When the first section opened in 1947, it was only the second long-distance superhighway in the US following the October 1940 opening of the Pennsylvania Turnpike. For these reasons, the Maine Turnpike was named a National Historic Civil Engineering Landmark by the American Society of Civil Engineers in 1999.

In 1956, one year after the Portland–Augusta extension opened, Congress created the Interstate Highway System. The remaining sections to be built—from Augusta to Fort Kent—would be publicly funded freeways instead of toll roads under the MTA. Today, this highway, which ends at Houlton instead of Fort Kent, is signed as I-95 throughout and the Maine Turnpike between the New Hampshire line at Kittery and the junction with US 202 near Augusta.

In 2015, the MTA purchased the segment from the Piscataqua River Bridge to milemarker 2.2 of I-95 from the Maine Department of Transportation (MaineDOT).

=== Speed limits ===
The Maine Turnpike had a posted speed limit of 70 mph (110 km/h) in the early 1970s, but, as Maine then had no law against traveling less than 10 mph (16 km/h) over the posted limit, the de facto speed limit was 79 mph (127 km/h). In 1974, as part of a federal mandate, the speed limit was reduced to 55 mph (89 km/h), with a new law including a "less than 10 over" violation. In 1987, Congress allowed states to post 65 mph (105 km/h) on rural Interstate Highways. Following the relaxation, Maine increased its speed limit. In May 2011, a bill was introduced to raise the speed limit on I-95 from Old Town to Houlton from 65 to 75 mph (105 to 121 km/h). It passed, with Maine the first state east of the Mississippi River since the 1970s to establish a 75-mile-per-hour (121 km/h) speed limit.

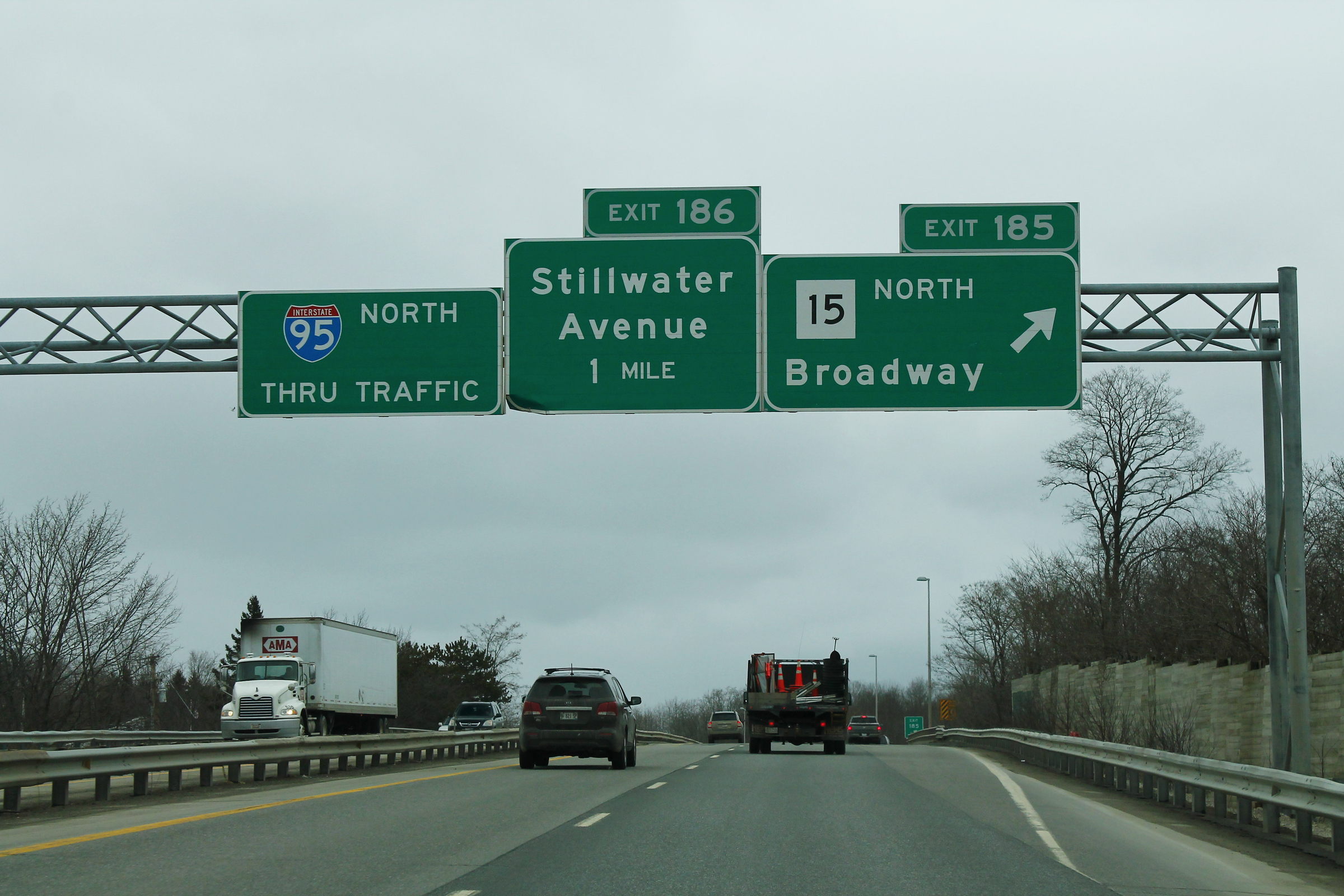
I-95 northbound at its separation from SR 15 in Bangor

A further law passed in 2013 by the Maine Legislature allowed MaineDOT and the MTA to change speed limits with the approval of the Maine State Police. Per that law, MaineDOT increased the 65-mile-per-hour (105 km/h) limit to 70 mph (110 km/h) on several sections of I-95 on May 27, 2014. These areas included the section from milemarker 114 just outside Augusta to mile 126 just before Waterville. In addition, the section from Fairfield (just north of Waterville) to Bangor also saw an increase to 70 mph (110 km/h). Speed limits on sections controlled by the MTA increased on August 11, 2014. The sections from milemarker 2.1 in Kittery to milemarker 44.1 in Scarborough and the section from milemarker 52.3 in Falmouth to milemarker 109 in Augusta increased from 65 to 70 mph (105 to 113 km/h). The section from milemarker 44.1 in Scarborough to milemarker 52.3 in Falmouth increased from 55 to 60 mph (89 to 97 km/h).

== Tolls ==
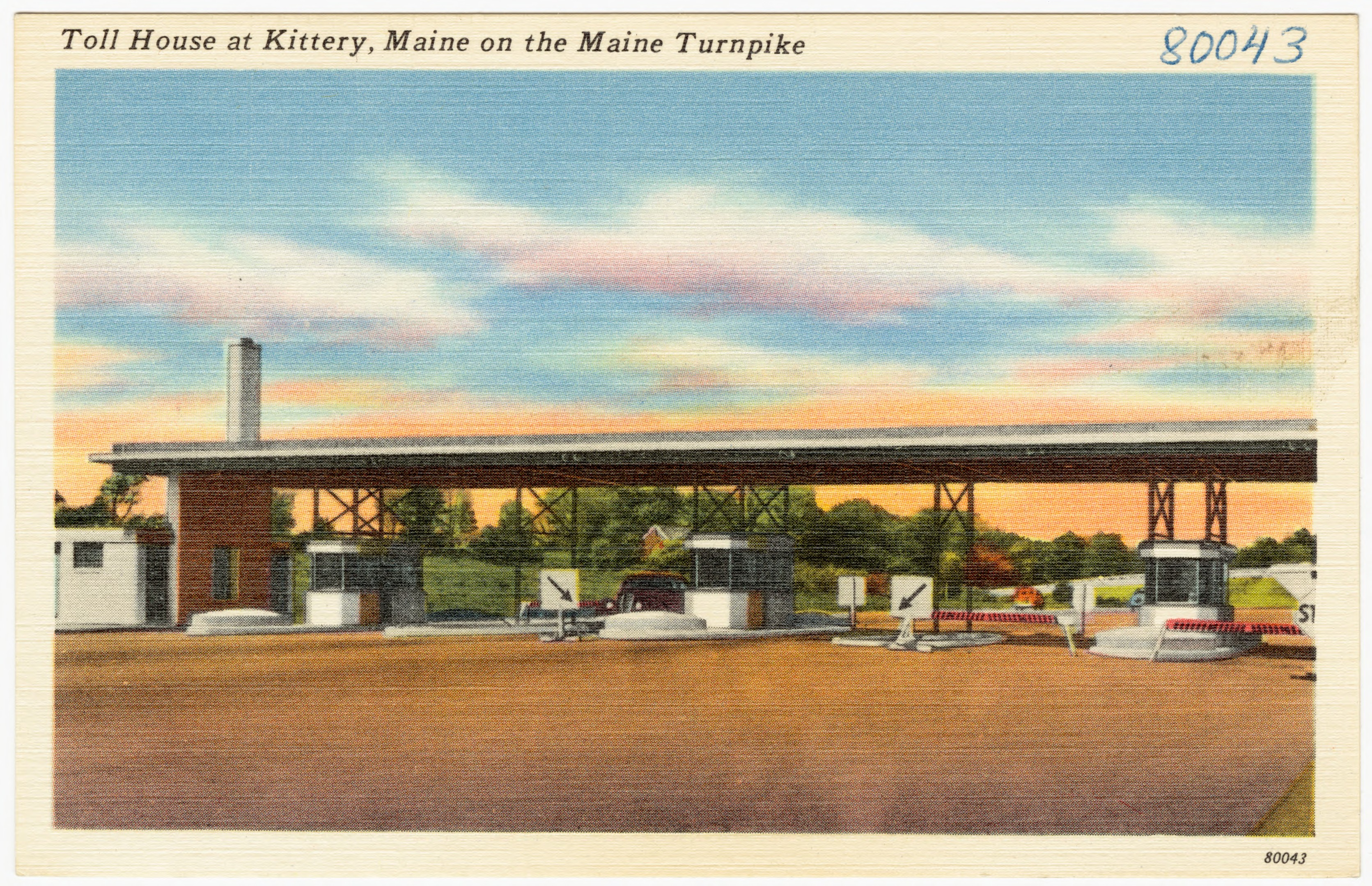
Early postcard of tollbooths at Kittery

The Maine Turnpike is a toll road for all of its length except south of York and between Auburn and Sabattus. Flat-fee tolls are paid upon entering the turnpike and at toll barriers in York, New Gloucester, and West Gardiner. As of December 5, 2025, it costs passenger vehicles $8.00 with cash and out-of-state E-ZPasses and $6.70 with a Maine issued E-ZPass to travel the entire length of the turnpike. The turnpike joined the E-ZPass electronic toll collection network in 2005, replacing the former Maine-only system designated Transpass that was implemented in 1997.

The tolls on the Maine Turnpike were not supposed to be permanent. Toll collections were to stop once the MTA paid off the debt from the road's construction. In the 1980s, the bonds were going to be paid off, but the Maine Legislature authorized the MTA in 1982 to continue as a quasigovernmental agency and to continue to collect tolls in order to fund the maintenance of the section of highway controlled by the MTA.

== Service plazas and rest areas ==
There are eleven total rest areas on I-95 in Maine, five of which are full service plazas operated by the MTA. Five of the rest areas are accessible from northbound only, four are accessible from southbound only, and two are accessible from both directions. The rest stops are open 24 hours and all provide restrooms and visitor information. Food and fuel services as well as ATMs are available only at the five major plazas. The plazas are at the following locations:

- Kennebunk: A separate plaza is located on each direction of the turnpike at milepost 25. These plazas are the largest and most profitable in the state, and they have near-identical layouts and each includes Burger King, Dunkin', Sbarro, Citgo gas stations, and Applegreen Market among the offerings. The original plazas opened in 1947 and incorporated a pedestrian tunnel under the highway to connect the two. These original plazas were replaced in 1972, and the tunnel was sealed. The 1972 plazas were then replaced during 2006–2007, reopening in 2007.
- Gray (northbound) and Cumberland (southbound): A separate plaza is located on each direction of the turnpike on either side of the Gray–Cumberland town line at milepost 59. Each includes Burger King (both sit-down and drive-thru) and a Citgo gas station. Both plazas were rebuilt in 2007 and are currently the only two plazas to feature a drive-thru food option.
- West Gardiner: Accessible from both directions of both the turnpike (I-95) and I-295, which converge just north of the plaza. The plaza itself is located just off the highways, along State Route 9 (SR 9) and SR 126. Similar in layout to the Kennebunk plazas, Burger King, Dunkin', Popeyes, Applegreen Market, and Citgo gas are among the offerings. This plaza also includes the Center for Maine Craft, a giftshop featuring locally made products and visitor information. The West Gardiner plaza was built and opened for business in 2008. The plaza replaced two smaller rest areas that were located in Lewiston (southbound at milepost 83) and Litchfield (northbound at milepost 98), both of which were closed and demolished.

There is a rest area and tourist welcome center located on the turnpike northbound at milepost 3 in Kittery. There are weigh stations located on the turnpike northbound and southbound in York at milepost 4 (southbound) and milepost 6 (northbound). There are ramps to and from the northbound turnpike to the Saco Ramada Hotel and Conference Center in Saco at milepost 35. The ramps are from the original exit 5 which was replaced when I-195 was opened just to the north. The hotel was built on the site of the old toll plaza. Ramps connecting the hotel to and from the southbound turnpike were removed as part of the widening project in the early 2000s when hotel ownership opted not to pay nearly $1 million (equivalent to $1.63 million in 2025) to build a new bridge. The MTA is reopened this as exit 35 during 2025 in order to relieve traffic congestion at the intersection of I-195 and Industrial Park Road, which can often back up to I-95.

North of Augusta, there are two additional pairs of rest areas before I-95's northern terminus in Houlton. Separate facilities are located on each direction of I-95 in Hampden, just south of Bangor; and in Medway, about halfway between Bangor and Houlton. There are 24-hour restrooms at all four locations, while the Hampden facilities each feature a state-operated Maine information center available during daytime hours. A final rest area, which also contains a state-operated Maine information center, is located in Houlton, and is accessible from both directions of I-95 by taking exit 302. The original rest area building has since been decommissioned and demolished as of mid-2022, but the information center relocated to the Marden’s shopping plaza at 114 North Street, just south of exit 302.

== Emergency routes ==
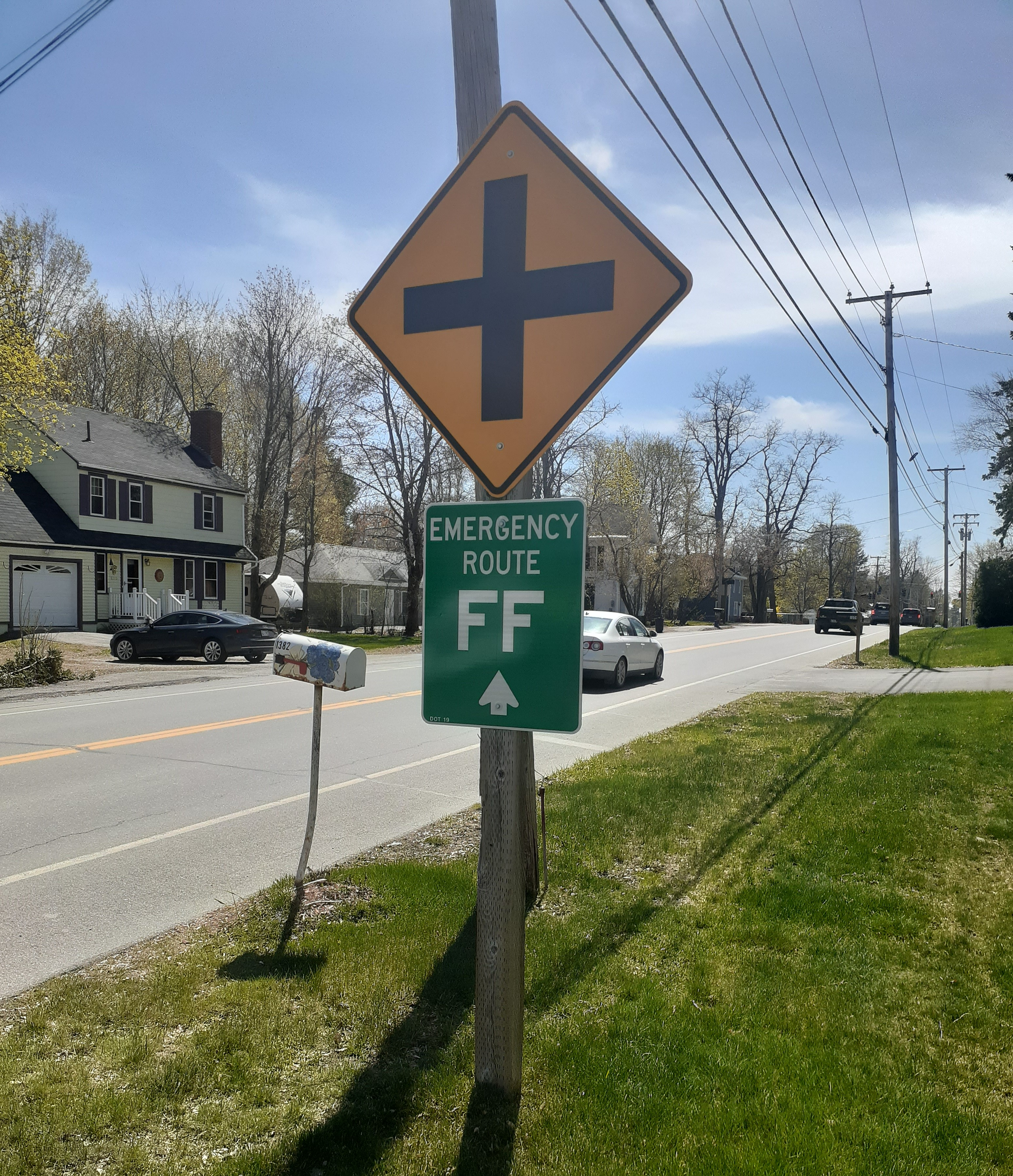
Emergency route sign on US 2 in Veazie

In 2019, MaineDOT began signing emergency routes along roads near I-95. The routes generally lead from one exit to the next exit and are meant to be used when sections of the highway must be closed due to an accident or other disruption. In such an event, electronic signs will be activated and flaggers deployed to direct drivers to use the appropriate emergency route to lead them around the closure and maintain traffic flow. Northbound routes are designated with a single letter, while southbound routes are designated with double letters. This system was first used when a section of highway was closed due to the death of a Maine State Trooper in an accident.

== Exit list ==
County	Location	mi	km	Exit	Destinations	Notes
Piscataqua River		0.00	0.00	—	I-95 south – Portsmouth, Boston Maine Turnpike begins	Continuation into New Hampshire; southern terminus of Maine Turnpike
York	Kittery	0.62	1.00	1	To SR 103 – Kittery Foreside, Navy Yard	Northbound exit and southbound entrance; access via Dennett Road
York	Kittery	1.24	2.00	2	US 1 / US 1 Byp. / SR 236 – South Berwick, Kittery	Southbound signage
York	Kittery	1.24	2.00	2	US 1 south / US 1 Byp. / SR 236 south	Northbound signage
York	Kittery	1.24	2.00	3	US 1 north / SR 236 north – Kittery, South Berwick	Northbound signage
York	York	6.79	10.93	7	To US 1 / SR 91 north – York, Ogunquit, Kittery	Access via Spur Road; signed for Ogunquit northbound, Kittery southbound
York	York	8.80	14.16	York Toll Barrier (southern end of closed toll system)		
York	Wells	19.00	30.58	19	SR 9 / SR 109 to US 1 – Wells, Sanford, Ogunquit	Northbound entrance toll; signed for Sanford northbound, Ogunquit southbound
York	Kennebunk	25.01	40.25	25	SR 35 to US 1 – Kennebunk, Kennebunkport	Entrance toll
York	Biddeford	31.09	50.03	32	SR 111 to US 1 – Biddeford, Arundel, Sanford	Entrance toll; signed for Arundel northbound, Sanford southbound
York	Saco	34.71	55.86	35	SR 112 to US 1 – Saco, Buxton, Biddeford	Entrance toll; interchange re-opened on November 3, 2025, after being closed since the opening of exit 36 in 1983
York	Saco	35.20	56.65	36	I-195 east – Saco, Old Orchard Beach	Entrance toll; western terminus of I-195; southbound signed as a single exit 36-35 due to a single off ramp to both exits
Cumberland	Scarborough	41.90	67.43	42	To US 1 / SR 114 – Scarborough, Gorham	Entrance toll; access via Haigis Parkway
Cumberland	Scarborough	43.51	70.02	44	I-295 north – Downtown Portland	Northbound exit and southbound entrance; toll; southern terminus of I-295
Cumberland	South Portland	44.24	71.20	45	To I-295 north / US 1 (SR 9) / SR 114 / Maine Mall Road – South Portland	Entrance toll; I-295 not signed northbound; access via SR 703
Cumberland	Portland	45.64	73.45	46	SR 9 to SR 22 (Congress Street) – Jetport	Entrance toll; access via Skyway Drive
Cumberland	Portland	46.65	75.08	47	SR 25 (Rand Road / Westbrook Arterial)	Entrance toll
Cumberland	Portland	47.83	76.97	48	Riverside Street / Larrabee Road to US 302 / SR 25	Entrance toll
Cumberland	Portland	50.87	81.87	52	To I-295 / US 1 – Falmouth, Freeport	Access via Falmouth Spur
Cumberland	Falmouth	51.62	83.07	53	SR 26 / SR 100 – Falmouth, Cumberland	Entrance toll
Cumberland	Gray	62.33	100.31	63	US 202 / SR 4 / SR 26 / SR 115 – Gray, Windham	Southbound entrance toll
Cumberland	New Gloucester	66.03	106.26	New Gloucester Toll Barrier (northern end of closed toll system)		
Androscoggin	Auburn	74.17	119.37	75	US 202 / SR 4 / SR 100 – Auburn, Lewiston, New Gloucester	Signed for Lewiston northbound, New Gloucester southbound
Androscoggin	Lewiston	79.11	127.32	80	To SR 196 – Lewiston, Auburn	Access via Alfred A. Plourde Parkway
Androscoggin	Sabattus	84.91	136.65	86	SR 9 to SR 126 – Sabattus, Lisbon	SR 196 not signed southbound
Kennebec	West Gardiner	98.74	158.91	West Gardiner Toll Barrier		
Kennebec	West Gardiner	100.50	161.74	102	SR 9 / SR 126 to I-295 south – Gardiner, Litchfield, West Gardiner Service Plaza	Northbound exit and southbound entrance
Kennebec	West Gardiner	101.25	162.95	103	I-295 south to SR 9 / SR 126 – Gardiner, Brunswick, West Gardiner Service Plaza	Southbound exit and northbound entrance; toll; northern terminus of I-295
Kennebec	Augusta	108.09	173.95	109	US 202 / SR 11 / SR 17 / SR 100 – Winthrop, Augusta Maine Turnpike ends	Signed as exits 109A (US 202 east) and 109B (US 202 west) southbound; northern terminus of Maine Turnpike; serves Augusta State Airport
Kennebec	Augusta	110.57	177.95	112	SR 8 / SR 11 / SR 27 – Augusta, Belgrade	Signed as exits 112A (SR 8 / SR 11 / SR 27 south) and 112B (SR 8 / SR 11 / SR 27 north) northbound
Kennebec	Augusta	111.43	179.33	113	SR 3 – Augusta, Belfast	Access to MaineGeneral Medical Center
Kennebec	Sidney	119.02	191.54	120	Lyons Road – Sidney	
Kennebec	Waterville	122.92	197.82	124	Trafton Road – Waterville	Opened on July 14, 2017
Kennebec	Waterville	125.72	202.33	127	SR 11 / SR 137 – Waterville, Oakland	
Kennebec	Waterville	128.79	207.27	130	SR 104 (Main Street) – Waterville, Winslow	Winslow not signed northbound
Somerset	Fairfield	130.84	210.57	132	SR 139 – Fairfield, Benton	
Somerset	Fairfield	131.87	212.22	133	US 201 – Fairfield, Skowhegan	
Kennebec	Clinton	136.46	219.61	138	Hinckley Road – Clinton, Burnham	
Waldo	No major junctions					
Somerset	Pittsfield	148.34	238.73	150	Somerset Avenue – Pittsfield, Hartland, Burnham	Signed for Hartland southbound, Burnham northbound
Somerset	Palmyra	155.27	249.88	157	SR 11 / SR 100 to US 2 / SR 7 – Newport, Dexter, Skowhegan	Signed for US 2/Skowhegan southbound; SR 7/Dexter northbound
Penobscot	Newport	157.18	252.96	159	Ridge Road – Newport, Plymouth	Southbound exit and northbound entrance
Penobscot	Plymouth	159.45	256.61	161	SR 7 – East Newport, Plymouth	
Penobscot	Etna	165.42	266.22	167	SR 69 / SR 143 – Etna, Dixmont	
Penobscot	Newburgh	172.20	277.13	174	SR 69 – Carmel, Winterport	
Penobscot	Hampden	178.12	286.66	180	Cold Brook Road – Hermon, Hampden	
Penobscot	Bangor	180.89	291.11	182	I-395 east / SR 15 south to US 2 / SR 100 west / US 1A / SR 9 – Bangor, Brewer, Hermon	Southern end of SR 15 concurrency; signed as exits 182A (I-395) and 182B (US 2); exits 1A and 1B on I-395
Penobscot	Bangor	181.76	292.51	183	US 2 / SR 100 (Hammond Street) – Airport	
Penobscot	Bangor	182.61	293.88	184	SR 222 (Union Street) / Ohio Street – Airport	Ohio Street not signed northbound
Penobscot	Bangor	183.82	295.83	185	SR 15 north / SR 15 Bus. south (Broadway) – Bangor, Brewer	Northern end of SR 15 concurrency; northern terminus of SR 15 Bus.; SR 15 Bus./Bangor/Brewer not signed northbound
Penobscot	Bangor	184.95	297.65	186	Stillwater Avenue	No northbound entrance; access to Bangor Mall
Penobscot	Bangor	185.73	298.90	187	Hogan Road – Bangor, Veazie	
Penobscot	Orono	189.20	304.49	191	Kelly Road – Orono, Veazie	Signed for Orono northbound, Veazie southbound
Penobscot	Orono	191.37	307.98	193	Stillwater Avenue – Stillwater, Old Town, Orono	Signed for Old Town northbound, Orono southbound
Penobscot	Old Town	195.38	314.43	197	SR 43 – Old Town, Hudson	
Penobscot	Old Town	197.86	318.42	199	SR 16 – Alton, Lagrange, Milo	Northbound exit and southbound entrance
Penobscot	Howland	214.97	345.96	217	SR 6 / SR 155 – Howland, Lagrange	
Penobscot	Chester	225.74	363.29	227	To US 2 / SR 6 / SR 116 – Lincoln, Mattawamkeag	Mattawamkeag not signed southbound; access via Access Road
Penobscot	Medway	242.66	390.52	244	SR 157 – Medway, Millinocket, Mattawamkeag	Signed for Medway northbound, Mattawamkeag southbound
Penobscot–Aroostook county line	North Penobscot–Benedicta line	257.18	413.89	259	Benedicta	Northbound exit and southbound entrance; access via Casey Road
Penobscot	No major junctions					
Aroostook	Sherman	262.43	422.34	264	SR 158 to SR 11 – Sherman, Patten	Patten not signed southbound
Aroostook	Island Falls	274.10	441.12	276	SR 159 – Island Falls, Patten	Patten not signed northbound
Aroostook	Oakfield	283.95	456.97	286	Oakfield Road – Oakfield, Smyrna Mills	
Aroostook	Smyrna	289.42	465.78	291	US 2 – Smyrna	
Aroostook	Houlton	300.05	482.88	302	US 1 – Houlton, Presque Isle	
Aroostook	Houlton	302.93	487.52	305	US 2 west – Houlton International Airport, Houlton Industrial Park	Last USA exit; Houlton Airport not signed southbound; eastern terminus of US 2
Houlton–Woodstock Border Crossing		303.12	487.82	Canadian border		
Houlton–Woodstock Border Crossing		303.12	487.82	–	Route 95 east to Route 2 – Woodstock	Continuation into New Brunswick
1.000 mi = 1.609 km; 1.000 km = 0.621 mi: Concurrency terminus; Incomplete access; Tolled; Unopened

== Auxiliary routes ==
- Interstate 195, a spur in Saco
- Interstate 295, runs from I-95 near downtown Portland to I-95 in West Gardiner
- Interstate 395, a spur east of Bangor
- Interstate 495, unsigned designation for the Falmouth Spur

Interstate 95
Previous state: New Hampshire	Maine	Next state: Terminus
