= Interstate 395 (Maine) =

Interstate Highway in Maine

Interstate 395
- I-395 highlighted in red

Route information
- Auxiliary route of I-95
- Maintained by MaineDOT
- Length: 4.99 mi (8.03 km)
- NHS: Entire route

Major junctions
- West end: I-95 / US 2 / SR 15 / SR 100 in Bangor
- US 202 / SR 9 in Bangor; US 1A / SR 9 Bus. in Bangor
- East end: US 1A / SR 9 in Brewer

Location
- Country: United States
- State: Maine
- Counties: Penobscot

Highway system
- Interstate Highway System; Main; Auxiliary; Suffixed; Business; Future; Maine State Highway System; Interstate; US; State; Auto trails; Lettered highways
← US 302	→ I-495

Interstate 395 (I-395) is a 4.99-mile-long (8.03 km) auxiliary Interstate Highway in the U.S. state of Maine. The western terminus of the route is at a cloverleaf interchange with I-95 near downtown Bangor. The eastern terminus is at US 1A and SR 9 in Brewer.

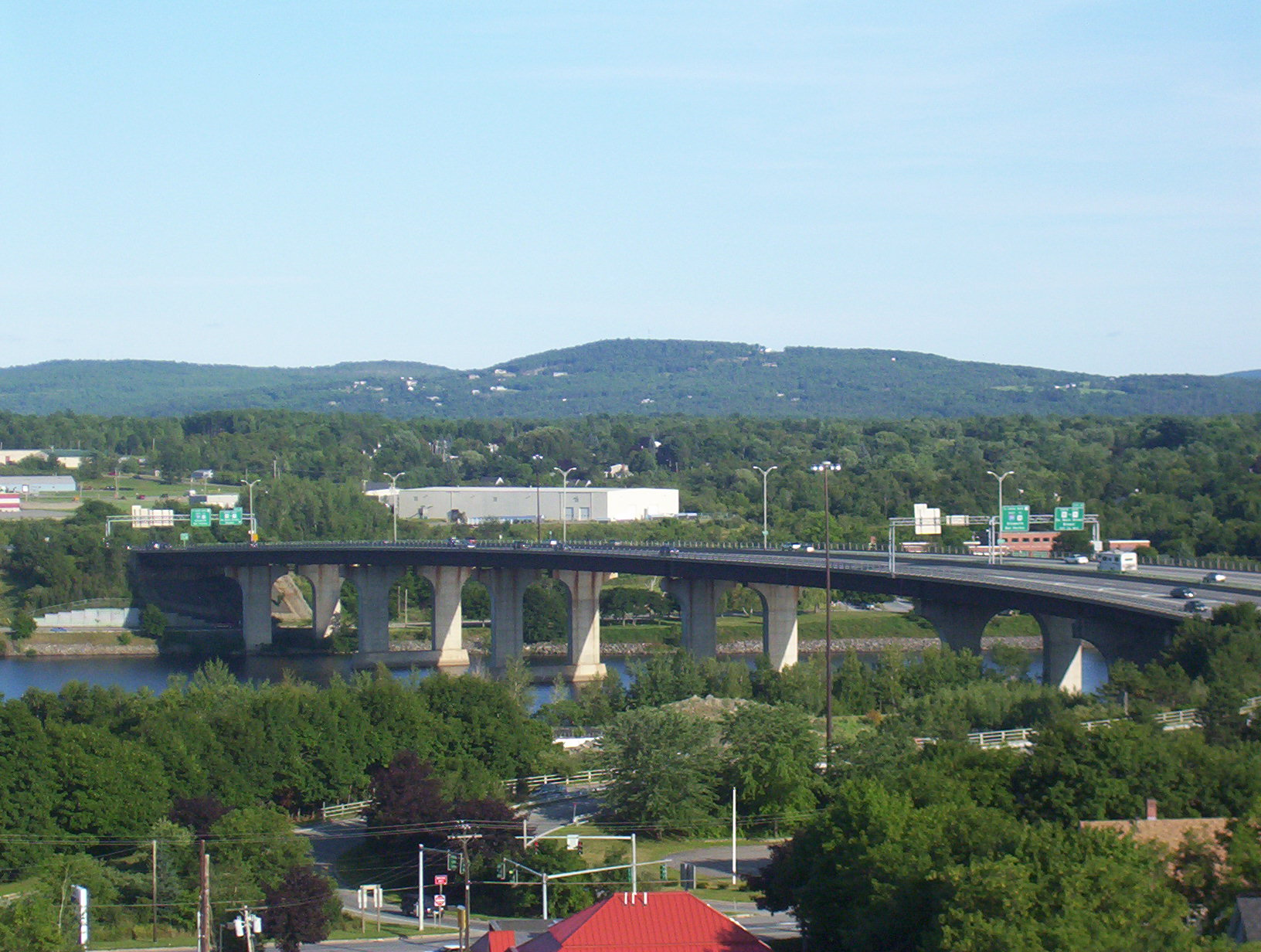
Veterans Remembrance Bridge carrying I-395 between Bangor and Brewer

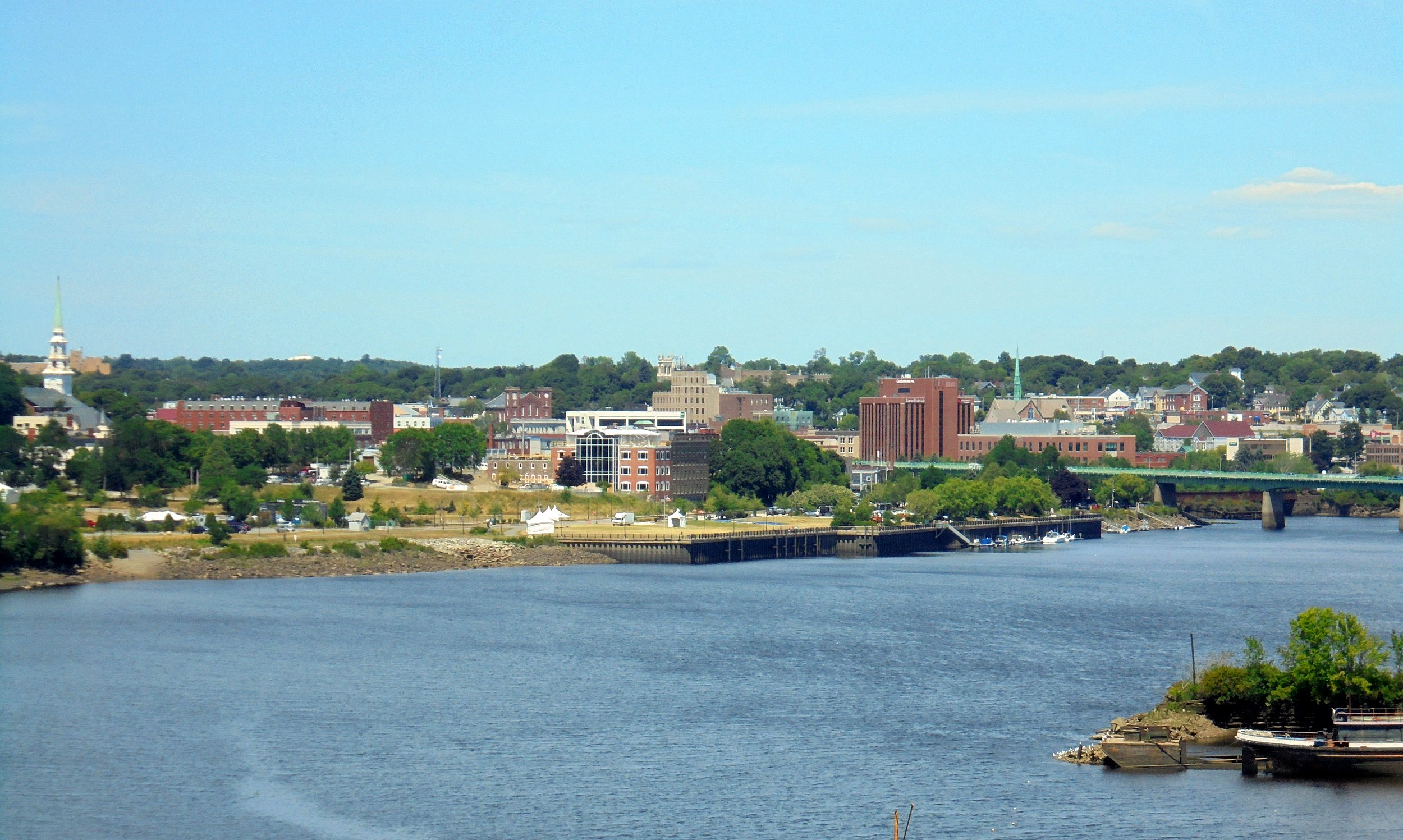
I-395 offers a wide view of downtown Bangor from Veterans Remembrance Bridge

== Route description ==
I-395 begins as an extension of Hammond Street at an at-grade intersection with US 2 and SR 100 on the south side of Bangor International Airport. US 2 and SR 100 turn north from the intersection onto Odlin Road, while I-395 reaches a cloverleaf interchange with its parent route, I-95, immediately to the east. The four-lane freeway is joined by SR 15 and travels east around the south side of Bangor, reaching the eastern terminus of US 202 at exit 2, near the Beal University campus, where it also picks up a concurrency with SR 9. I-395 then intersects Main Street at exit 3, carrying US 1A and SR 9 Business, near the Cross Insurance Center on the west side of the Penobscot River.

The freeway crosses the Penobscot River on the Veterans Remembrance Bridge, which carries four through lanes and two auxiliary lanes from Bangor to Brewer. SR 15 leaves I-395 and SR 9 at exit 4 on the east bank of the river, while the freeway continues southeast through the outskirts of Brewer. I-395 travels into the rural outskirts of the Bangor area and turns northeastward to terminate at a partial cloverleaf interchange with Wilson Street (part of US 1A) east of Brewer. US 1A continues southeast towards the Down East region of the state, serving Ellsworth and several coastal towns. After the intersection, the mainline SR 9 continues as a Super 2 bypassing Brewer to the south.

The freeway primarily serves as a bypass of Bangor and Brewer for travelers wishing to access the Down East/Bar Harbor region of Maine. It also connects I-95 to the region via US 1A. It is designated by the Maine state government as part of Highway Corridor Priority 1, which includes all Interstate Highways in the state as well as other important roads. Traffic volumes on the highway, measured in terms of annual average daily traffic by the Maine Department of Transportation (MaineDOT), ranged in 2017 from a minimum of 8,470 vehicles near its eastern terminus to a maximum of 17,090 vehicles on the Veterans Remembrance Bridge.

== History ==
I-395 was originally named the Bangor Industrial Spur and was intended to relieve traffic on Hammond and Union streets in the city's industrial area. Construction began on December 2, 1957, and was part of a larger project to construct I-95 around Bangor. The first section of the highway, from Hammond Street to Main Street in southern Bangor, opened on September 24, 1959, and was formally dedicated on October 29. It was the first Interstate Highway to be completed with federal funding under the Federal-Aid Highway Act of 1956 and cost an estimated $3.79 million (equivalent to $31.1 million in 2024) to construct.

The 1,550-foot (470 m) Veterans Remembrance Bridge, connecting Bangor to Brewer over the Penobscot River, was dedicated on November 11, 1986. It was designated in 1985 by the state legislature following disagreements between local groups over which person or war should be honored by the name. The extension of I-395 over the bridge and through Brewer to Wilson Street (US 1A) opened to traffic on November 17. During its first days of public use, the Brewer section was targeted for speed enforcement due to its 55-mile-per-hour (89 km/h) speed limit and low traffic.

== Future ==
Plans to extend I-395 to connect it to SR 9 began as early as 2001. In February 2008, MaineDOT suggested five possible routes to extend I-395 to SR 9, with two in particular designated as "State's Choice" and "Holden's Choice". The state's choice route would cut through the middle of Holden and connect to SR 9 in east Eddington; Holden's choice would run along the Brewer–Holden border and join SR 9 earlier. Since then, the state eliminated the "State's Choice" route and began work on the "Holden's Choice", designated 2B-2. Despite all three affected communities issuing resolutions in 2014 opposing this route, the state went forward with the project as a super two rerouting of SR 9. Design completed in 2021, and construction commenced in 2022. The project was officially completed on June 27, 2025, and the new road opened to traffic.

== Exit list ==
The entire route is in Penobscot County.

Location	mi	km	Exit	Destinations	Notes
Bangor	0.00	0.00	–	US 2 / SR 100 – Hermon, Airport	At-grade intersection; western terminus of I-395
Bangor	0.22	0.35	1	I-95 / SR 15 north – Newport, Orono, Airport	Western end of SR 15 concurrency; signed as exits 1A (south) and 1B (north); exits 182A-B on I-95
Bangor	0.92	1.48	2	US 202 / SR 9 west – Hampden	Eastern terminus of US 202; western end of SR 9 concurrency
Bangor	1.67	2.69	3	US 1A / SR 9 Bus. / Farm Road (Main Street) – Downtown Bangor, Hampden	Signed as exits 3A (west) and 3B (east) eastbound
Penobscot River	1.91	3.07	Veterans' Remembrance Bridge		
Brewer	2.05	3.30	4	SR 15 south / SR 15 Bus. north (South Main Street) – Brewer, Bucksport	Eastern end of SR 15 concurrency; southern terminus of SR 15 Bus.; signed for SR 15 Bus. westbound, SR 15 eastbound
Brewer	2.76	4.44	5	Industrial Park Road / Parkway South – Brewer	
Brewer	4.74	7.63	6	US 1A to US 1 (Coastal Route) – Ellsworth, Bar Harbor, Downtown Brewer	Signed as exits 6A (east) and 6B (west)
Brewer	4.99	8.03	–	SR 9 east – Eddington, Calais	Road continues east as SR 9; eastern terminus of I-395
1.000 mi = 1.609 km; 1.000 km = 0.621 mi: Concurrency terminus
