= List of auxiliary Interstate Highways =

Dwight D. Eisenhower National System of Interstate and Defense Highways
- Highway shield for Interstate 295

- Interstate Highways in the 48 contiguous states; auxiliary routes are in blue

System information
- Formed: June 29, 1956

Highway names
- Interstates: Interstate X (I-X)

System links
- Interstate Highway System; Main; Auxiliary; Suffixed; Business; Future

Auxiliary Interstate Highways (also called three-digit Interstate Highways) are a subset of highways within the United States' Interstate Highway System. The 323 auxiliary routes generally fall into three types: spur routes connect to or intersect the parent route at one end, bypasses connect to the parent route at both ends, and beltways form a circle that intersects the parent route at two locations.

Some routes connect to the parent route at one end, and to another route at the other end. Some states treat these as spurs while others treat them as bypasses. Like the primary Interstate Highways, auxiliary highways meet Interstate Highway standards, with rare exceptions.

Generally, the shorter auxiliary routes branch from primary routes. Their numbers are based on the parent route's number. For example, all of the supplement routes for Interstate 95 (I-95) are designated with a three-digit number ending in "95": I-x95. With some exceptions, spur routes are numbered with an odd hundreds digit, such as I-395. Bypasses and beltways are numbered with an even hundreds digit, such as I-695. Because longer Interstates may have many such supplemental routes, the numbers can repeat from state to state along their route, but they will not repeat within a state.

Three states have no auxiliary Interstate Highways: Alaska, Arizona (though there are three cancelled/unbuilt auxiliary Interstates in the state), and New Mexico. North Dakota has an auxiliary route, but it is unsigned, and Wyoming's does not meet Interstate Highway standards.

== Terminology and guidelines ==
Routes that begin with an even number generally connect to the main highway in two locations. Odd numbers only connect in one location.

Auxiliary Interstates are divided into three types: spur, loop, and bypass routes.

The first digit of the three digits usually signifies whether a route is a bypass, spur, or beltway. The last two digits are derived from the main Interstate Highway. For instance, I-115 contains an odd number in the first digit (1), which indicates that this freeway is a spur. The last two digits signify the highway's origin. In this case, the "15" in I-115 shows that it is a supplement to I-15.

Exceptions to the standard numbering guidelines exist for a number of reasons, such as original routes being changed, extended, or abandoned, leaving discrepancies in the system. In other cases, it may not be possible to use the proper number because the limited set of available numbers has been exhausted, causing a "non-standard" number to be used.

=== Spur route ===
A spur route's number usually has an odd number for its first digit. It is usually one of the following:

- It may serve another section of a city or metropolitan area not served by the main freeway, most often the central business district, terminating at a regular city street/avenue or at a substandard freeway, such as I-185 in Columbus, Georgia.
- It may represent the first portion of a contemplated extended freeway, one that downgrades to below Interstate standards with plans to upgrade it later on. An example is I-369 in Texas, which currently does not connect with parent route I-69.
- It may connect two unrelated Interstate highways—as I-390 in New York and I-355 in Illinois do.
  - States differ on their interpretation of the numbering convention in this case. In the I-390 example above, the route has both ends at Interstates, but not at the same Interstate on both ends, and is assigned an odd first digit. Another example is I-275 in Knoxville, Tennessee. It is a connector between I-40 and I-75 (a similar case of having both ends at Interstates but not at the same Interstate) and is assigned an even first digit.
  - This may even vary within the same state. For example, in Michigan, both I-196 and I-696 intersect I-96 at one end and I-94 at the other end.

Examples include:

- I-110 in California links I-10 with the Port of Los Angeles. This freeway was built before Interstate Highways as the Harbor Freeway. Later, it was adopted into the Interstate Highway System.
- I-180 in North-Central Pennsylvania connects Williamsport and Lycoming County with I-80 in Milton, which does not actually enter Lycoming County. I-180 also serves as a connection to those traveling to New York and I-86 via U.S. Route 15 and I-99 at its western terminus.
- I-190 in New York connects the cities of Niagara Falls and Buffalo with I-90.

Sometimes, a three-digit Interstate Highway branches off from another three-digit Interstate Highway. These spurs do not connect directly with their parent highways, but are associated with them via the three-digit highways they do intersect with.

Examples include:

- I-380 in Northern California is located at the San Francisco Bay Area. This highway begins at I-280, and it connects with US 101 and San Francisco International Airport.
- I-190 in Massachusetts branches off from I-290 near Worcester.
- I-795 in Baltimore County, Maryland branches off from I-695.

=== Bypass ===
A bypass route may traverse around a city, or may run through it with the mainline bypassing. In a typical 3-digit Interstate Highway, bypasses usually have both its two termini junctioned with another Interstate highway. Bypass routes are preceded by an even number in the first digit.

Examples include:

- I-220 in Louisiana serves as a bypass of downtown Shreveport.
- I-440 forms a loop around the south side of Nashville.
- I-890 travels through downtown Schenectady, which I-90 does not go through.

In the case of an auxiliary Interstate highway which has both ends at Interstates but not the same Interstate, some states treat these as bypasses while others treat these as spurs—see Spur route above.

=== Beltway ===
A beltway, also known as a loop route, completely surrounds a large metropolitan city, and it is often connected with multiple junctions to other routes. Unlike other auxiliary Interstate Highways, and by extension, all primary Interstate Highways, beltways do not have termini; however, they have a place where the highway mileage resets to zero. Beltways are preceded by an even number in the first digit.

Some examples of beltways include:

- I-275 in Ohio, Kentucky and Indiana encircles the city of Cincinnati.
- I-465 in Indiana encircles the city of Indianapolis.
- I-495 in Maryland and Virginia encircles the city of Washington, D.C., and is referred to as "The Capital Beltway".

== Auxiliary Interstates ==
Note: this table sorts the route numbers by parent highway.

| Number | Length (mi) | Length (km) | Southern or western terminus | Northern or eastern terminus | Formed | Removed | Notes |
|---|---|---|---|---|---|---|---|
| H-201 | 4.10 | 6.60 | Route 99 in ʻAiea | H-1 in Honolulu, HI | 1990 | current | Signed as Route 78 until 2004 |
| I-105 | 17.32 | 27.87 | SR 1 in El Segundo, CA | I-605 in Norwalk, CA | 1963 | current | Replaced segments of SR 42 |
| I-205 | 12.97 | 20.87 | I-580 near Tracy, CA | I-5 near Tracy, CA | 1970 | current | |
| I-305 | 6.00 | 9.66 | I-80 Bus/US 50/I-80 in West Sacramento, CA | I-80 Bus/US 50/SR 99 in Sacramento, CA | 1981 | current | Unsigned |
| I-405 | 72.15 | 116.11 | I-5 in Irvine, CA | I-5 in Mission Hills, CA | 1964 | current | |
| I-505 | 32.98 | 53.08 | I-80 in Vacaville, CA | I-5 in Dunnigan, CA | 1977 | current | Originally part of I-5W |
| I-605 | 27.40 | 44.10 | I-405 in Seal Beach, CA | I-210 in Irwindale, CA | 1964 | current | |
| I-805 | 28.02 | 45.09 | I-5 in San Ysidro, CA | I-5 in Sorrento Valley, CA | 1959 | current | |
| I-905 | 8.96 | 14.42 | Tocayo Avenue/Oro Vista Road in Nestor, CA | Boulevard Garita de Otay at the United States-Mexico border in Otay Mesa, CA | proposed | — | Currently SR 905, proposed to be signed as an Interstate |
| I-105 | 3.49 | 5.62 | OR 99/OR 126 Business/OR 126 in Eugene, OR | I-5/OR 126 in Springfield, OR | 1958 | current | Concurrent with OR 126 |
| I-305 | — | — | Pine Street in Salem, OR | I-5 in Keizer, OR | 1957 | 1976 | Canceled |
| I-405 | 3.53 | 5.68 | I-5 in Portland, OR | I-5 in Portland, OR | 1958 | current | |
| I-505 | 3.17 | 5.10 | US 30 in Portland, OR | I-405 in Portland, OR | 1969 | 1979 | Canceled |
| I-205 | 36.64 | 58.97 | I-5 in Tualatin, OR | I-5 in Salmon Creek, WA | 1958 | current | |
| I-405 | 30.30 | 48.76 | I-5/SR 518 in Tukwila, WA | I-5/SR 525 in Lynnwood, WA | 1957 | current | |
| I-605 | — | — | WA 99 in Federal Way, WA | I-5 in Everett, WA | — | — | Never built, was planned to bypass Seattle, WA |
| I-705 | 1.50 | 2.41 | I-5/SR 7 in Tacoma, WA | Schuster Parkway in Tacoma | 1978 | current | |
| I-210 | 4.9 | 7.9 | I-10 in Mobile, AL | I-65 in Prichard, AL | — | — | Currently I-165, the route number was decommissioned because it had no connection to I-10 |
| I-410 | — | — | I-10/I-17 in Phoenix, AZ | I-10 in Phoenix, AZ | — | — | Now part of I-10 in Phoenix, AZ |
| I-510 | — | — | I-10/SR 51 in Phoenix, AZ | SR 101 in Phoenix, AZ | — | — | Currently designated as SR 51 (Piestewa Freeway) |
| I-710 | — | — | I-10 in Tucson, AZ | North Campbell Avenue/East 6th Street in Tucson, AZ | — | — | Mostly never built freeway that was to connect to University of Arizona campus from I-10 |
| I-110 | 20.43 | 32.88 | SR 47 in San Pedro, CA | I-10/SR 110 in Los Angeles, CA | 1978 | current | Originally part of US 6, then signed as SR 11 |
| I-210 | 48.72 | 78.41 | I-5 in Sylmar, CA | SR 57/SR 210 in Glendora, CA | 1964 | current | Does not connect physically with I-10 as segment from SR 57 east to I-10 is still signed as SR 210, formerly SR 30 prior to 2007. |
| I-710 | 19.66 | 31.64 | Terminal Island in Long Beach, CA | Valley Boulevard in Alhambra, CA | 1983 | current | Originally signed as SR 7 |
| I-110 | 6.94 | 11.17 | US 98 Bus. near Pensacola, FL | I-10 near Pensacola, FL | 1969 | current | |
| I-110 | 8.89 | 14.31 | I-10 in Baton Rouge, LA | US 61 in Baton Rouge, LA | 1964 | current | |
| I-210 | 12.40 | 19.96 | I-10 west of Lake Charles, LA | I-10 east of Lake Charles, LA | 1964 | current | |
| I-310 | 11.25 | 18.11 | US 90/LA 3127 in Boutte, LA | I-10 west of Kenner, LA | 1983 | current | |
| I-310 | 2.70 | 4.35 | US 90 Bus. in New Orleans, LA | I-10 in New Orleans, LA | 1964 | 1969 | Canceled Vieux Carré Riverfront Expressway |
| I-410 | 1.90 | 3.06 | LA 67 in Baton Rouge, LA | I-10 in Baton Rouge, LA | 1961 | 1964 | Renumbered as I-110 |
| I-410 | 48.5 | 78.1 | I-10 west of New Orleans, LA | I-10 in New Orleans, LA | 1969 | 1977 | Canceled southern bypass of New Orleans; completed portions became I-310 and I-510 |
| I-510 | 3.04 | 4.89 | LA 47 in New Orleans, LA | I-10/LA 47 in New Orleans, LA | 1992 | current | Concurrent with Louisiana Highway 47 |
| I-610 | 4.52 | 7.27 | I-10 at Metairie–New Orleans, LA line | I-10 in New Orleans, LA | 1965 | current | |
| I-910 | 9.70 | 15.61 | US 90 Bus. in Marrero, LA | I-10/US 90 Bus. in New Orleans, LA | 1999 | current | Unsigned; completely concurrent with US 90 Bus.; both designation are temporary placeholders for Future I-49 |
| I-110 | 4.10 | 6.60 | US 90 in Biloxi, MS | I-10 in D'Iberville, MS | 1988 | current | |
| I-310 | — | — | US 90 near the Port of Gulfport, MS | I-10 in Gulfport, MS | — | — | Proposed spur into Gulfport, MS. Canceled in the 2010s due to local and environmental opposition. |
| I-110 | 0.92 | 1.48 | Av Abraham Lincoln at the United States-Mexico border in El Paso, TX | I-10 in El Paso, TX | 1967 | current | |
| I-410 | 49.49 | 79.65 | Beltway around San Antonio, TX | | 1959 | current | |
| I-610 | 37.97 | 61.11 | Beltway around Houston, TX | | 1975 | current | |
| I-215 | 54.50 | 87.71 | I-15 in Murrieta, CA | I-15 in Devore, CA | 1982 | current | Originally signed as I-15E, then SR 215 |
| I-115 | 1.19 | 1.92 | I-15/I-90 in Butte, MT | Iron Street in Butte, MT | 1971 | current | Concurrent with I-15 Bus./I-90 Bus. for its entire length |
| I-315 | 0.83 | 1.34 | I-15 in Great Falls, MT | I-15 Bus/US 89 in Great Falls, MT | 1960 | current | Unsigned |
| I-215 | 11.10 | 17.86 | I-15/Clark County Route 215 in Enterprise, NV | I-11/US 93/SR 564 in Henderson, NV | 1996 | current | |
| I-515 | 20.54 | 33.06 | US 93/US 95 in Henderson, NV | I-15/US 93/US 95 in Las Vegas, NV | 1976 | 2024 | Not signed until 1994, this route is entirely concurrent with US 93/US 95; replaced by northward extensions of I-11 in 2017 and 2024 |
| I-215 | 29.02 | 46.70 | I-80 in Salt Lake City, UT | I-15 in North Salt Lake, UT | 1963 | current | |
| I-415 | 2.39 | 3.85 | I-80 in Salt Lake City, UT | 4430 S in Holladay, UT | 1965 | 1969 | Designation was scrapped to provide a single route number 215 for the entire route. |
| I-516 | 6.49 | 10.44 | SR 21/SR 204 in Savannah, GA | SR 21 in Garden City, GA | 1985 | current | Concurrent with Georgia State Route 21 |
| I-420 | 5.40 | 8.69 | I-285 in College Park, GA | I-20 in Atlanta, GA | 1983 | 1986 | Never built, was planned to bypass Atlanta, GA |
| I-520 | 23.34 | 37.56 | I-20 in Augusta, GA | I-20 in North Augusta, SC | 1980 | current | |
| I-220 | 17.62 | 28.36 | I-20/LA 3132 in Shreveport, LA | I-20 in Bossier City, LA | 1979 | current | |
| I-420 | 10.20 | 16.42 | I-20 in West Monroe, LA | I-20 in Monroe, LA | 1957 | 1964 | Canceled bypass of Monroe |
| I-220 | 12.01 | 19.33 | I-20 in Jackson, MS | I-55 in Ridgeland, MS | 1981 | current | |
| I-820 | 35.17 | 56.60 | I-20 in Fort Worth, TX | I-20/US 287 in Fort Worth, TX | 1959 | current | |
| I-222 | — | — | I-22 in Graysville, AL | I-422 in Brookside, AL | proposed | — | Proposed connector between I-422 and I-22 due to the inability to make a direct connection between the two routes. |
| I-422 | — | — | I-20/I-59/I-459/US 11 in Bessemer, AL | I-59 in Argo, AL | proposed | — | Currently under construction; will only be indirectly connected to I-22 via I-222. |
| I-124 | 1.97 | 3.17 | I-24 in Chattanooga, TN | US 27 in Chattanooga, TN | 1960 | current | Unsigned; concurrent with US 27 for its whole length |
| I-225 | 12.00 | 19.31 | I-25 in Denver, CO | I-70 in Aurora, CO | 1976 | current | |
| I-425 | 5.31 | 8.55 | I-25/US 36 at Welby, CO | I-70/US 36 at Denver, CO | — | 1959 | Renumbered as I-270 by AASHTO |
| I-126 | 3.68 | 5.92 | I-26 in Columbia, SC | US 21/US 76/US 176/US 321 in Columbia, SC | 1961 | current | Completely concurrent with US 76 |
| I-326 | 5.24 | 8.43 | I-26 in Cayce, SC | SC 48 in Columbia, SC | 1976 | 1995 | Now part of I-77, formerly unsigned |
| I-526 | 19.26 | 31.00 | US 17 in Charleston, SC | I-526 Bus./US 17 in Mount Pleasant, SC | 1989 | current | |
| I-129 | 3.48 | 5.60 | US 20/US 75/US 77 in South Sioux City, NE | I-29/US 20/US 75 in Sioux City, IA | 1976 | current | Completely concurrent with US 20 |
| I-229 | 14.97 | 24.09 | I-29 in St. Joseph, MO | I-29/US 59/US 71 in St. Joseph, MO | 1986 | current | |
| I-229 | 11.33 | 18.23 | I-29 in Sioux Falls, SD | I-90 near Sioux Falls, SD | 1966 | current | |
| I-130 | 5 | 8.0 | I-30/I-49 in Texarkana, AR | US 59/US 71 near Texarkana, AR | 2000 | 2014 | Was given a future designation during its existence due to not being upgraded to Interstate Highway standards; freeway became part of I-49 once completed |
| I-430 | 12.93 | 20.81 | I-30/US 67/US 70 in Little Rock, AR | I-40/US 65 in Little Rock, AR | 1980 | current | |
| I-530 | 46.65 | 75.08 | US 63/US 79/US 65B/US 65/US 425/AR 190 in Pine Bluff, AR | I-30/US 65/US 67/US 167/I-440 in Little Rock, AR | 1999 | current | Concurrent with US 65 |
| I-630 | 7.40 | 11.91 | I-430/Chenal Parkway/Shackleford Road near Little Rock, AR | I-30/US 65/US 67/US 167 in Little Rock, AR | 1985 | current | |
| I-235 | 13.78 | 22.18 | I-35/I-80 in West Des Moines, IA | I-35/I-80 near Des Moines, IA | 1961 | current | |
| I-135 | 95.74 | 154.08 | Kansas Turnpike/I-35 in Wichita, KS | I-70/US 40/US 81 in Salina, KS | 1976 | current | |
| I-235 | 16.52 | 26.59 | I-135/US 81 in Wichita, KS | I-135/US 81/K-15/K-254 in Wichita, KS | 1965 | current | |
| I-335 | 50.13 | 80.68 | I-35/Kansas Turnpike/US 50 in Emporia, KS | I-470/Kansas Turnpike in Topeka, KS | 1987 | current | |
| I-435 | 80.81 | 130.05 | Beltway around Kansas City, KS, and Kansas City, MO | | 1965 | current | |
| I-635 | 8.90 | 14.32 | I-35 in Overland Park, KS | I-29/US 71 in Kansas City, MO | 1968 | current | |
| I-335 | 2.74 | 4.41 | I-94 in Minneapolis, MN | I-35W in Minneapolis, MN | 1964 | 1978 | Canceled |
| I-535 | 2.78 | 4.47 | I-35/US 53 in Duluth, MN | US 53/WIS 35 in Superior, WI | 1971 | current | Concurrent with US 53 |
| I-235 | 5.36 | 8.63 | I-35/I-40/US 62/US 77/US 270 in Oklahoma City, OK | I-44/US 77/SH-66 in Oklahoma City, OK | 1989 | current | Concurrent with US 77 |
| I-335 | 19.6 | 31.5 | SE 89th Street in Oklahoma City, OK | I-44/Turner Turnpike in Luther, OK | 2024 | current | Routed along the Kickapoo Turnpike; does not currently connect to its parent |
| I-635 | 37.00 | 59.55 | I-20 in Balch Springs, TX | SH 121 in Grapevine, TX | 1959 | current | |
| I-440 | 9.96 | 16.03 | I-30/I-530 near Little Rock, AR | I-57/US 67/US 167 near Sherwood, AR | 2003 | current | |
| I-540 | 15.87 | 25.54 | US 271/AR 253 near Fort Smith, AR | I-40 in Van Buren, AR | 1965 | current | |
| I-140 | 25.4 | 40.9 | US 17 near Winnabow, NC | I-40/US 17 in Wilmington, NC | 2008 | current | |
| I-240 | 9.54 | 15.35 | I-26/I-40/US 74 near Asheville, NC | I-40/US 74A in Asheville, NC | 1980 | current | |
| I-440 | 16.77 | 26.99 | I-40/US 1/US 64 near Cary, NC | I-40 near Raleigh, NC | 1991 | current | |
| I-540 | 25.84 | 41.59 | I-40 near Durham, NC | I-87/US 64/US 264 near Knightdale, NC | 1997 | current | |
| I-840 | 21.9 | 35.2 | I-40/I-73/US 421 in Greensboro, NC | I-40/I-85/I-785/I-85 Bus. in Greensboro, NC | 2011 | current | |
| I-240 | 26.8 | 43.1 | I-344/John Kilpatrick Turnpike/SH-152 in Oklahoma City, OK | I-40/US 270/SH-3 in Oklahoma City, OK | 1965 | current | Extended westward from I-44 to I-344 in 2024 |
| I-440 | 9.96 | 16.03 | I-40/I-240 near Oklahoma City, OK | I-35 in Oklahoma City, OK | — | 1975 | Now part of I-44 |
| I-140 | 11.17 | 17.98 | I-40/I-75/SR 162 near Farragut, TN | US 129/SR 162 near Alcoa, TN | 1987 | current | Also designated as the Pellissippi Parkway |
| I-240 | 19.27 | 31.01 | I-40/SR 14 in Memphis, TN | I-40/Sam Cooper Boulevard in Memphis, TN | 1970 | current | Also designated as the Dr. Martin Luther King Jr. Expressway/W.B. Fowler Sr. Expressway/Avron B. Fogelman Expressway |
| I-440 | 7.64 | 12.30 | I-40 in Nashville, TN | I-24 in Nashville, TN | 1987 | current | Known locally as the Four-Forty Parkway; also designated as the Debra K. Johnson Memorial Parkway |
| I-640 | 7.03 | 11.31 | I-40/I-75 in Knoxville, TN | I-40/US 25W in Knoxville, TN | 1982 | current | |
| I-840 | 77.28 | 124.37 | I-40 near Dickson, TN | I-40 near Lebanon, TN | 2016 | current | Originally designated SR 840 until completion |
| I-244 | 20 | 32 | I-270/I-55 in Mehlville, MO | I-270/I-70 in Bridgeton, MO | — | — | Redesginated as I-270 in the late-1970s for consistency along the St. Louis Beltway |
| I-244 | 15.75 | 25.35 | I-44/SH-66 in Sapulpa, OK | I-44/US 412/SH-66 in Tulsa, OK | 1970 | current | |
| I-344 | 29.4 | 47.3 | I-240 in Oklahoma City, OK | I-35/I-44/Turner Turnpike in Oklahoma City, OK | 2024 | current | Routed along the John Kilpatrick Turnpike |
| I-444 | 2.51 | 4.04 | I-244/US 64/US 75/SH-51 in Tulsa, OK | I-244/US 75/US 412 in Tulsa, OK | 1970 | current | Unsigned, concurrent with US 75 |
| I-345 | 1.40 | 2.25 | I-30/US 67/I-45 in Dallas, TX | US 75/Spur 366 in Dallas, TX | 1973 | current | Unsigned |
| I-555 | 49.80 | 80.15 | I-55 in Turrell, AR | AR 91 in Jonesboro, AR | 2016 | current | |
| I-155 | 32.13 | 51.71 | I-55 in Lincoln, IL | I-74 in Morton, IL | 1992 | current | |
| I-255 | 30.82 | 49.60 | I-55/I-270 in Mehlville, MO | I-270/IL 255 in Pontoon Beach, IL | 1986 | current | |
| I-355 | 32.51 | 52.32 | I-80 in New Lenox, IL | I-290 in Itasca, IL | 1989 | current | |
| I-155 | 15.93 | 25.64 | I-55 near Hayti, MO | US 51 at Dyersburg, TN | 1980 | current | Concurrent with U.S. Route 412 for its entire length. |
| I-255 | — | — | I-55/I-240 in Memphis, TN | I-40 in Memphis, TN | — | — | Now part of I-55 and I-240 |
| I-359 | 2.30 | 3.70 | I-20/I-59 in southern Tuscaloosa, AL | 15th Street in downtown Tuscaloosa, AL | 1983 | current | Concurrent with US 11/AL 69 |
| I-459 | 32.80 | 52.79 | I-20/I-59 in Bessemer, AL | I-59 in Trussville, AL | 1984 | current | |
| I-759 | 4.50 | 7.24 | I-59 in Attalla, AL | US 411/SR 759 in Gadsden, AL | 1986 | current | |
| I-164 | 21.39 | 34.42 | US 41/Veterans Memorial Parkway in Evansville, IN | I-69 in Evansville, IN | 1990 | 2014 | Decommissioned; now part of I-69 |
| I-264 | 22.93 | 36.90 | I-64 in Louisville, KY | I-71 in Louisville, KY | 1956 | current | |
| I-264 | 25.07 | 40.35 | I-64/I-664 in Chesapeake, VA | Parks Ave in Virginia Beach, VA | 1960 | current | |
| I-464 | 4.71 | 7.58 | I-64 in Chesapeake, VA | I-264 in Norfolk, VA | 1960 | current | |
| I-564 | 3.03 | 4.88 | SR 337 in Norfolk, VA | I-64 in Norfolk, VA | 1970 | current | |
| I-664 | 20.21 | 32.52 | I-64/I-264 in Norfolk, VA | I-64 in Hampton, VA | 1971 | current | |
| I-165 | 4.90 | 7.89 | US 43 in Mobile, AL | I-65 in Mobile, AL | 1994 | current | |
| I-565 | 21.40 | 34.44 | I-65/US 72/SR 20 in Decatur, AL | US 72 in Huntsville, AL | 1991 | current | Completely concurrent with US 72 Alt. |
| I-265 | 2 | 3.2 | I-40 in Nashville, TN | I-65 in Nashville, TN | — | 2000 | Now part of I-65 |
| I-165 | 69.684 | 112.146 | I-65 in Bowling Green, KY | US 60/US 231 in Owensboro, KY | 2019 | current | Replaced the William H. Natcher Parkway; originally designated as I-66 Spur in 2008 followed by I-65 Spur in 2015 |
| I-365 | 88 | 142 | I-65 near Park City, KY | US 27 in Somerset, KY | proposed | — | Future designation along the Cumberland Parkway |
| I-165 | 2.70 | 4.35 | I-65/I-70 in Indianapolis, IN | 38th Street in Indianapolis, IN | 1978 | 1981 | Was to be a spur linking from I-65/70 to 38th Street entirely with Indianapolis |
| I-265 | 31.21 | 50.23 | I-64/US 150/SR 62 in New Albany, IN | I-65/I-265/KY 841 in Heritage Creek, KY | 1977 | current | Completed on December 18, 2016, with the completion of the East End Bridge that connected the Indiana segment to the Kentucky segment |
| I-465 | 52.79 | 84.96 | Beltway around Indianapolis | | 1970 | current | |
| I-865 | 4.72 | 7.60 | I-65 near Indianapolis, IN | I-465 near Indianapolis | 2002 | current | Concurrent with US 52 |
| I-66 Spur | 69.684 | 112.146 | I-65 in Bowling Green, KY | US 60/US 231 in Owensboro, KY | 2008 | 2015 | Designation was to replace the William H. Natcher Parkway as part of the proposed I-66 Southern Kentucky Corridor; the route was redesignated as I-65 Spur (which became I-165) when the I-66 project was cancelled |
| I-266 | 1.79 | 2.88 | I-66 in Arlington, VA | I-66 in Washington, DC | — | 1972 | Proposed loop route of I-66 between the District, and Arlington County; if built, would have been the only auxiliary route of I-66; canceled in the face of community opposition during Washington's freeway revolts |
| I-169 | 34.27 | 55.15 | I-24 near Hopkinsville, KY | I-69 in Nortonville, KY | 2017 | current | New designation along the former Pennyrile Parkway; signed in December 2024 |
| I-369 | 23.441 | 37.725 | I-69 in Henderson, KY | US 60 in Owensboro, KY | proposed | — | Proposed for designation along Audubon Parkway once upgraded to Interstate standards |
| I-569 | 38.446 | 61.873 | I-69/I-169 in Nortonville, KY | I-165 in Beaver Dam, KY | proposed | — | Future designation for the western part of Western Kentucky Parkway once upgraded to Interstate standards |
| I-269 | 45.19 | 72.73 | I-55/I-69/MS 304 in Hernando, MS | I-40/SR 385 in Arlington, TN | 2015 | current | Construction completed in October 2018; co-signed with SR 304 in Mississippi; extension to Millington, TN to connect with the proposed I-69 extension planned |
| I-169 | 18.7 | 30.1 | US 45W/US 51 in Union City, TN | US 45E/SR 43 in Martin, TN | — | — | Proposed for designation along SR 22 once upgraded to Interstate standards in a Tennessee Senate resolution in 2002, which later died in the Tennessee General Assembly. |
| I-469 | 30.83 | 49.62 | I-69 in Fort Wayne, IN | I-69 in Fort Wayne, IN | 1995 | current | |
| I-169 | 1.50 | 2.41 | Port of Brownsville in Brownsville, TX | I-69E/US 77/US 83 in Olmito, TX | 2015 | current | Currently under construction; partially open and co-signed with SH 550 |
| I-369 | 3.50 | 5.63 | I-30/US 59 in Texarkana, TX | US 59/SH 93 in Texarkana, TX | 2013 | current | Partially completed in 2013; concurrent with US 59 |
| I-270 | 5.31 | 8.55 | I-25/US 36 at Welby, CO | I-70/US 36 at Denver, CO | 1965 | current | Concurrent with US 36 |
| I-470 | — | — | Beltway around Denver Metro, CO | | — | — | Northwestern portion cancelled due to local opposition; completed segments are designated as SH 470 or E-470 |
| I-270 | 50.59 | 81.42 | I-55/I-255 in Mehlville, MO | I-55/I-70 near Troy, IL | 1956 | current | |
| I-470 | 13.72 | 22.08 | I-70 in Topeka, KS | I-70/Kansas Turnpike in Topeka, KS | 1960 | current | |
| I-670 | 2.81 | 4.52 | I-70 in Kansas City, KS | I-70 in Kansas City, MO | 1968 | current | |
| I-170 | 2.30 | 3.70 | I-70 in Baltimore, MD | US 40 in Baltimore, MD | 1969 | 1983 | Canceled |
| I-270 | 32.60 | 52.46 | I-70 near Frederick, MD | I-495 north of Bethesda, MD | 1975 | current | |
| I-270 Spur | 2.10 | 3.38 | I-270 east of Potomac, MD | I-495 northwest of Bethesda, MD | 1975 | current | Serves as an alternate connector for Virginia travelers |
| I-370 | 2.54 | 4.09 | I-270 in Gaithersburg, MD | MD 200 in Derwood, MD | 1988 | current | Does not connect to I-70. |
| I-170 | 11.17 | 17.98 | I-64/US 40 in Richmond Heights, MO | I-270 in Hazelwood, MO | 1956 | current | |
| I-470 | 16.72 | 26.91 | I-49/I-435 in Kansas City, MO | I-70 in Independence, MO | 1983 | current | |
| I-270 | 54.97 | 88.47 | Beltway around Columbus, OH | | 1964 | current | |
| I-470 | 6.69 | 10.77 | I-70 near Blaine, OH | I-70 in Elm Grove, WV | 1976 | current | |
| I-670 | 9.37 | 15.08 | I-70 in Columbus, OH | I-270 near John Glenn Columbus International Airport | 2003 | current | |
| I-271 | 46.06 | 74.13 | I-71 near Medina, OH | I-90 in Willoughby Hills, OH | 1964 | current | |
| I-471 | 5.75 | 9.25 | I-275 near Newport, KY | I-71 in Cincinnati, OH | 1981 | current | |
| I-172 | 19.69 | 31.69 | I-72 in Quincy, IL | US 24 in Quincy, IL | 1995 | current | |
| I-474 | 14.88 | 23.95 | I-74 in Peoria, IL | I-74 in Morton, IL | 1973 | current | |
| I-274 | 16.83 | 27.09 | US 158 near Clemmons, NC | Future I-74/Future I-285/US 52 in Bethania, NC | proposed | — | Proposed route in Winston-Salem, NC |
| I-175 | 1.44 | 2.32 | I-275 in St. Petersburg, FL | SR 687 in St. Petersburg, FL | 1980 | current | |
| I-275 | 60.64 | 97.59 | I-75 near Memphis, FL | I-75 in Wesley Chapel, FL | 1973 | current | |
| I-375 | 1.34 | 2.16 | I-275 in St. Petersburg, FL | US 92 in St. Petersburg, FL | 1979 | current | |
| I-175 | — | — | US 82 in Albany, GA | I-75 in Cordele, GA | — | — | Now part of SR 300 |
| I-475 | 15.83 | 25.48 | I-75 in Macon, GA | I-75 in Macon, GA | 1965 | current | |
| I-575 | 30.97 | 49.84 | I-75 in Kennesaw, GA | SR 5 west of Nelson, GA | 1985 | current | |
| I-675 | 11.04 | 17.77 | I-75 in Stockbridge, GA | I-285 southeast of Atlanta, GA | 1987 | current | |
| I-275 | 83.71 | 134.72 | Beltway around Cincinnati, OH | | 1962 | current | Runs through Indiana, Ohio and Kentucky; I-75 does not run through Indiana |
| I-275 | 35.01 (Note: According to the FHWA, I-275 in Michigan is only 29.97 mi (48.23 km) because they do not count the length overlapping I-96. MDOT and most major map publishers do count the overlap.) | 56.34 | I-75 near Monroe, MI | I-96, I-696 and M-5 in Farmington Hills, MI | 1977 | current | |
| I-375 | 1.06 | 1.71 | BS I-375 in Detroit, MI | I-75 in Detroit, MI | 1964 | current | Proposed to be downgraded to a boulevard |
| I-475 | 16.99 | 27.34 | I-75 near Grand Blanc, MI | I-75/US 23 near Mount Morris, MI | 1973 | current | Runs east and north of Flint, MI |
| I-675 | 7.72 | 12.42 | I-75/US 23 near Saginaw, MI | I-75/US 23 near Zilwaukee, MI | 1971 | current | |
| I-475 | 20.37 | 32.78 | I-75 in Perrysburg, OH | I-75 in Toledo, OH | 1964 | current | |
| I-675 | 26.53 | 42.70 | I-75 near Miamisburg, OH | I-70 near Medway, OH | 1987 | current | |
| I-175 | — | — | I-75 in Chattanooga, TN | I-75 in Lexington, KY | — | — | |
| I-275 | 2.98 | 4.80 | I-40 in Knoxville, TN | I-75/I-640 in Knoxville, TN | 1982 | current | |
| I-475 | — | — | I-40/I-75 near Knoxville, TN | I-75 near Knoxville, TN | 1990 | — | Canceled due to local opposition and high construction costs |
| I-676 | 6.90 | 11.10 | I-76/US 30 in Philadelphia, PA | I-76 in Camden, NJ | 1991 | current | Signed as Interstate 680 when I-76 was signed as I-80S |
| I-176 | 11.33 | 18.23 | I-76/Pennsylvania Turnpike in Morgantown, PA | US 422 near Reading, PA | 1964 | current | Signed as Interstate 180 when the Pennsylvania Turnpike (I-76) was signed as I-80S |
| I-276 | 29.78 | 47.93 | I-76/Pennsylvania Turnpike in King of Prussia, PA | I-95/I-295 in Bristol Township, PA | 1964 | current | Routed along the Pennsylvania Turnpike; originally terminated at the Delaware River–Turnpike Toll Bridge prior to the completion of an interchange between the turnpike and I-95 in 2018 |
| I-376 | 84.42 | 135.86 | I-80 near Hermitage, PA | I-76 (Pennsylvania Turnpike)/US 22 in Monroeville, PA | 1972 | current | |
| I-476 | 129.61 | 208.59 | I-95 near Chester, PA | I-81/US 6/US 11 near Clarks Summit, PA | 1970 | current | Longest auxiliary Interstate Highway |
| I-876 | 1.57 | 2.53 | PA 885 in Pittsburgh, PA | I-279/PA 28 in Pittsburgh, PA | 1970 | 1971 | Short lived renumbering of I-479, now I-579 |
| I-277 | 4.46 | 7.18 | I-77/US 21/US 74/NC 27 in Charlotte, NC | I-77/US 21/NC 16 in Charlotte, NC | 1981 | current | Partial loop around Uptown Charlotte |
| I-277 | 4.14 | 6.66 | I-76 in Akron, OH | I-77 in Akron, OH | 1970 | current | Concurrent with US 224 |
| I-178 | — | — | — | — | — | 1971 | Canceled |
| I-378 | — | — | — | — | 1968 | 1971 | Replaced by PA Route 378 |
| I-278 | 35.62 | 57.32 | US 1/9 in Linden, NJ | Bruckner Interchange in Bronx, NY | 1961 | current | Does not intersect with parent route I-78; Signed for all 5 boroughs in New York City |
| I-478 | 2.14 | 3.44 | I-278 in Brooklyn, NY | NY 9A in Manhattan, NY | 1971 | current | Unsigned designation for the Brooklyn–Battery Tunnel; does not intersect with parent route I-78 |
| I-678 | 14.33 | 23.06 | John F. Kennedy International Airport in Queens, NY | Bruckner Interchange in Bronx, NY | 1965 | current | Does not intersect with parent route I-78 |
| I-878 | 0.70 | 1.13 | I-678 in Queens, NY, near John F. Kennedy International Airport | JFK Expressway in Queens, NY, near JFK Airport | 1970 | current | Unsigned; does not intersect with parent route I-78; eastbound only; shortest auxiliary Interstate Highway; also known as NY 878 |
| I-179 | — | — | McKean Township, PA | Erie, PA | 1958 | 1968 | Replaced by its parent route, I-79 |
| I-279 | 13.32 | 21.44 | I-376/US 22/US 30 in Pittsburgh, PA | I-79 in Franklin Park, PA | 1972 | current | |
| I-479 | 1.57 | 2.53 | PA 885 in Pittsburgh, PA | I-279/PA 28 in Pittsburgh, PA | 1966 | 1970 | Early number for I-579 |
| I-579 | 1.57 | 2.53 | PA 885 in Pittsburgh, PA | I-279/PA 28 in Pittsburgh, PA | 1971 | current | Does not connect with I-79 |
| I-180 | — | — | US 101 in San Rafael, CA | I-80 near Berkeley, CA | 1978 | 1991 | Temporary designation of what was formerly part of SR 17, now part of I-580 |
| I-280 | 57.22 | 92.09 | I-680/US 101 in San Jose, CA | King Street in San Francisco, CA | 1964 | current | |
| I-238 | 2.23 | 3.59 | I-880 in San Leandro, CA | I-580/SR 238 in Castro Valley, CA | 1983 | current | Considered an auxiliary route of I-80 in California; there is no I-38 |
| I-380 | 1.671 | 2.689 | I-280 in San Bruno, CA | US 101 in San Bruno, CA | 1964 | current | Does not connect to I-80 |
| I-480 | — | — | I-80 in San Francisco, CA | Sansome Street in San Francisco, CA | 1957 | 1968 | Was to be the Embarcadero Freeway; downgraded to a state highway in 1968 and fully decommissioned in 1991 |
| I-580 | 75.63 | 121.71 | US 101 in San Rafael, CA | I-5 near Westley, CA | 1964 | current | Segments were originally part of I-5W |
| I-680 | 70.52 | 113.49 | I-280/US 101 in San Jose, CA | I-80 in Cordelia, CA | 1955 | current | Originally SR 21 |
| I-780 | 6.50 | 10.46 | I-80 in Vallejo, CA | I-680 in Benicia, CA | 1955 | current | Originally part of I-680 |
| I-880 | 47.22 | 75.99 | I-280/SR 17 in San Jose, CA | I-80/I-580 in Oakland, CA | 1983 | current | Originally part of SR 17 |
| I-880 | — | — | I-80 in West Sacramento, CA | I-80 in Sacramento, CA | 1971 | 1983 | Now part of I-80 |
| I-980 | 2.03 | 3.27 | I-880 in Oakland, CA | I-580/SR 24 in Oakland, CA | 1981 | current | Does not connect to I-80 |
| I-580 | 30.09 | 48.43 | US 50 in Carson City, NV | I-80 in Reno, NV | 2012 | current | Runs concurrently with US 395 |
| I-180 | 13.19 | 21.23 | IL 26/IL 71 in Hennepin, IL | I-80 near Princeton, IL | 1969 | current | |
| I-280 | 26.98 | 43.42 | I-80 near Davenport, IA | I-74/I-80 near Colona, IL | 1990 | current | |
| I-380 | 73.05 | 117.56 | I-80 near Iowa City, IA | US 218 in Waterloo, IA | 1985 | current | Connects Waterloo and Cedar Rapids, IA, with I-80; concurrent with the Avenue of the Saints |
| I-480 | 4.90 | 7.89 | I-80/US 75 in Omaha, NE | I-29/US 6 in Council Bluffs, IA | 1966 | current | |
| I-680 | 16.49 | 26.54 | I-80 in Omaha, NE | I-29 near Crescent, IA | 1966 | current | |
| I-880 | 16.57 | 26.67 | I-29 near Loveland, IA | I-80 near Neola, IA | 2019 | current | Former section of I-680 |
| I-180 | 3.18 | 5.12 | US 34 in Lincoln, NE | I-80/US 34/US 77 in Lincoln, NE | 1965 | current | Concurrent with U.S. Route 34; only auxiliary route of I-80 fully in Nebraska |
| I-280 | — | — | I-80 in Omaha, NE | I-29 near Crescent, IA | 1958 | 1965 | Redesignated as I-680 due to the I-280 already being planned in the Davenport, Iowa area |
| I-580 | 1.60 | 2.57 | I-480 in Omaha, NE | Lake Street in Omaha, NE | 1976 | 1982 | Now part of US 75 due to the I-480 interchange not being up to interstate standards |
| I-280 | 17.85 | 28.73 | I-80 in Parsippany-Troy Hills, NJ | I-95/New Jersey Turnpike in Kearny, NJ | 1958 | current | |
| I-280 | 12.41 | 19.97 | I-80/I-90/Ohio Turnpike in Lake Township, OH | I-75 in Toledo, OH | 1959 | current | |
| I-480 | 41.77 | 67.22 | I-80/Ohio Turnpike in North Ridgeville, OH | I-80/Ohio Turnpike in Streetsboro, OH | 1971 | current | |
| I-680 | 16.43 | 26.44 | I-76/Ohio Turnpike in North Lima, OH | I-80/SR 11 near Mineral Ridge, OH | 1964 | current | |
| I-180 | 28.85 | 46.43 | US 15/US 220 in Williamsport, PA | I-80/PA 147 near Milton, PA | 1984 | current | |
| I-180 | — | — | — | — | — | 1964 | Original number for I-176 when the Pennsylvania Turnpike (I-76) was I-80S |
| I-280 | — | — | — | — | 1958 | 1964 | Now part of the Pennsylvania Turnpike and signed as I-276 |
| I-380 | 24.76 | 39.85 | I-80 in Tunkhannock Township, PA | I-81/I-84/US 6 in Dunmore, PA | 1973 | current | |
| I-480 | — | — | — | — | 1958 | 1964 | Early number for I-476 when I-76 was I-80S |
| I-680 | — | — | — | — | 1958 | 1964 | Original number for I-676 when I-76 was I-80S |
| I-180 | 1.09 | 1.75 | I-80 in Cheyenne, WY | I-80 Bus./US 30 in Cheyenne, WY | 1984 | current | Built as a boulevard, not to Interstate Highway standards; concurrent with I-25 BL/US 85/US 87 Bus; Only auxiliary Interstate Highway in Wyoming |
| I-281 | 9.45 | 15.21 | I-81 in Onondaga, NY | New York State Thruway (I-90) in DeWitt, NY | — | 1970 | Redesignated as I-481 on January 1, 1970 |
| I-481 | 15.04 | 24.20 | I-81 in Onondaga, NY | I-81/NY 481 in North Syracuse, NY | 1970 | 2026 | Decommissioned when I-81 was rerouted onto the freeway and the original I-81 routing became I-81 Business |
| I-781 | 4.30 | 6.92 | I-81 in Pamelia, NY | Fort Drum main gate in Le Ray, NY | 2012 | current | |
| I-381 | 1.67 | 2.69 | SR 381 in Bristol, VA | I-81 in Bristol, VA | 1961 | current | |
| I-581 | 6.64 | 10.69 | US 220/SR 24 in Roanoke, VA | I-81 near Hollins, VA | 1955 | current | Completely concurrent with US 220 |
| I-181 | 23.85 | 38.38 | US 321/SR 67 in Johnson City, TN | US 11W/SR 1 in Kingsport, TN | 1985 | 2007 | Now part of I-26 |
| I-182 | 15.19 | 24.45 | I-82/US 12 near Richland, WA | US 12/US 395 in Pasco, WA | 1969 | current | Completely concurrent with US 12 |
| I-283 | 2.91 | 4.68 | I-76/Pennsylvania Turnpike near Highspire, PA | I-83/US 322/Capital Beltway near Harrisburg, PA | 1972 | current | |
| I-184 | 3.62 | 5.83 | I-84 in Boise, ID | US 20/US 26 in Boise, ID | 1990 | current | |
| I-384 | 8.20 | 13.20 | I-84/US 6 in East Hartford, CT | US 6/US 44 in Bolton, CT | 1984 | current | Completely concurrent with US 6 |
| I-684 | 28.47 | 45.82 | I-287 near White Plains, NY | NY 22 near Brewster, NY | 1974 | current | Original routing of I-87; also crosses into Connecticut |
| I-685 | 14.00 | 22.53 | I-65 in downtown Montgomery, AL | I-85 in Montgomery, AL | proposed | — | Future designation for I-85 in Montgomery once the Montgomery Outer Loop is completed and I-85 is routed onto it |
| I-185 | 49.30 | 79.34 | US 27/US 280/SR 520 in Columbus, GA | I-85 near LaGrange, GA | 1979 | current | |
| I-285 | 63.98 | 102.97 | Beltway around Atlanta, GA | | 1969 | current | |
| I-485 | 5.9 | 9.5 | I-75/I-85 in Atlanta, GA | I-85 in Atlanta, GA | 1964 | 1975 | Completed section now the Freedom Parkway, was planned to relieve traffic along Downtown Connector (I-75/85) through downtown Atlanta |
| I-985 | 24.04 | 38.69 | I-85 near Buford, GA | SR 369 near Gainesville, GA | 1985 | current | |
| I-285 | 22.8 | 36.7 | I-85/I-85 Bus./US 29/US 52/US 70 near Lexington, NC | I-40/US 52/US 311/NC 8 in Winston-Salem, NC | 2018 | current | An unconfirmed section of Future I-285 is to continue north of I-40 for 10 miles (16 km) along US 52, through downtown Winston-Salem, to the proposed Winston-Salem Northern Beltway. |
| I-485 | 66.68 | 107.31 | Beltway around Charlotte, NC | | 1988 | current | |
| I-685 | — | — | Greensboro, NC | Dunn, NC | proposed | — | Future designation that will run concurrently with US 421 once the latter route is upgraded to interstate standards |
| I-785 | 7.00 | 11.27 | I-40/I-85/I-840/I-85 Bus. in Greensboro, NC | US 70 in Greensboro, NC | 2013 | current | Future northern terminus at US 29/US 58/US 360/US 58 Bus. in Danville, VA |
| I-885 | 8.566 | 13.786 | I-40/NC 885 in Research Triangle Park, NC | I-85/US 70/US 15 in Durham, NC | 2022 | current | |
| I-185 | 17.70 | 28.49 | I-385 near Mauldin, SC | US 29 in Greenville, SC | 1955 | current | |
| I-385 | 42.16 | 67.85 | I-26 near Clinton, SC | US 276 in Greenville, SC | 1962 | current | |
| I-585 | 2.25 | 3.62 | US 176/US 221/SC 9 in Spartanburg, SC | I-85 Bus./US 176 near Spartanburg, SC | 1962 | current | Does not connect to I-85, completely concurrent with US 176 |
| I-587 | 55.9 | 90.0 | I-87/US 64 near Zebulon, NC | US 264 near Greenville, NC | 2022 | current | Former section of US 264; does not currently connect to I-87 |
| I-287 | 98.72 | 158.87 | I-95/New Jersey Turnpike/Route 440 in Edison, NJ | I-95 in Rye, NY | 1961 | current | Serves as a bypass of New York City; I-87 does not enter New Jersey |
| I-187 | — | — | I-287/New York State Thruway in Greenburgh, NY | I-95 in Rye, NY | 1957 | 1958 | Original designation for the Cross-Westchester Expressway; it was signed as I-487 when it opened |
| I-487 | — | — | I-287/New York State Thruway in Greenburgh, NY | I-95 in Rye, NY | 1958 | 1961 | Original signed designation for the Cross-Westchester Expressway; it was replaced by an extension of I-287 |
| I-487 | — | — | I-87/I-287/New York State Thruway in Tarrytown, NY | I-84 in Beacon, NY | 1965 | 1971 | Known as the Hudson River Expressway; the project was cancelled and the only portion to be constructed and opened is now the Croton Expressway |
| I-587 | 1.21 | 1.95 | I-87/New York State Thruway/NY 28 in Kingston, NY | NY 28/NY 32 in Kingston, NY | 1960 | current | |
| I-687 | 9.10 | 14.65 | I-90/New York State Thruway in Colonie, NY | I-90 in Albany | — | 1973 | Also known as the Albany Airport Connector; the project was cancelled in the face of local opposition |
| I-787 | 10.16 | 16.35 | I-87/New York State Thruway in Albany, NY | NY 7 in Green Island, NY | 1968 | current | |
| I-189 | 1.49 | 2.40 | US 7 in South Burlington, VT | I-89 in South Burlington, VT | 1980 | current | |
| I-190 | 3.07 | 4.94 | O'Hare International Airport in Chicago, IL | I-90 in Chicago, IL | 1978 | current | |
| I-290 | 29.84 | 48.02 | I-90/IL 53 in Rolling Meadows, IL | I-90/I-94/Ida B. Wells Drive in Chicago, IL | 1972 | current | |
| I-490 | 1.5 | 2.4 | I-294 in Franklin Park, IL | I-90 in Des Plaines, IL | 2026 | current | Opened in 2026 |
| I-190 | 19.26 | 31.00 | I-290 in Worcester, MA | Route 2 in Leominster, MA | 1983 | current | |
| I-290 | 20.16 | 32.44 | I-395 in Auburn, MA | I-495 in Marlborough, MA | 1970 | current | |
| I-190 | 28.34 | 45.61 | I-90/New York State Thruway in Cheektowaga, NY | Highway 405 at Lewiston, NY | 1959 | current | |
| I-290 | 9.80 | 15.77 | I-190 in Tonawanda, NY | I-90/New York State Thruway in Williamsville, NY | 1964 | current | |
| I-390 | 76.06 | 122.41 | I-86/NY 17 in Avoca, NY | I-490 in Gates, NY | 1973 | current | |
| I-490 | 37.40 | 60.19 | I-90/New York State Thruway in Bergen, NY | I-90/New York State Thruway in Victor, NY | 1970 | current | |
| I-590 | 5.31 | 8.55 | I-390 in Brighton, NY | I-490/NY 590 in Rochester, NY | 1980 | current | |
| I-690 | 14.19 | 22.84 | I-90/New York State Thruway/NY 690 in Van Buren, NY | I-481 in East Syracuse, NY | 1962 | current | |
| I-790 | 2.41 | 3.88 | I-90/New York State Thruway in Deerfield, NY | NY 5A/NY 55 in Utica, NY | 1961 | current | Fully concurrent with NY 5 |
| I-890 | 9.35 | 15.05 | I-90/New York State Thruway in Rotterdam, NY | I-90/New York State Thruway in Guilderland, NY | 1962 | current | |
| I-990 | 6.35 | 10.22 | I-290 in Amherst, NY | NY 263 near Lockport, NY | 1985 | current | Highest numbered Interstate in the Interstate system |
| I-490 | 2.43 | 3.91 | I-71/I-90 in Cleveland, OH | East 55th Street in Cleveland, OH | 1990 | current | |
| I-190 | 1.72 | 2.77 | I-90 in Rapid City, SD | US 16 in Rapid City, SD | 1962 | current | Completely concurrent with US 16 |
| I-291 | 6.02 | 9.69 | I-91 in Windsor, CT | I-84 in Manchester, CT | 1994 | current | |
| I-691 | 8.38 | 13.49 | I-84 at the Southington-Cheshire, CT town line | I-91 in Meriden, CT | 1988 | current | |
| I-291 | 5.44 | 8.75 | I-91 in Springfield, MA | I-90/Massachusetts Turnpike in Chicopee, MA | 1972 | current | |
| I-391 | 4.46 | 7.18 | I-91 in Chicopee, MA | High Street in Holyoke, MA | 1970 | current | |
| I-293 | 11.18 | 17.99 | I-93/NH 101 in Manchester, NH | I-93/Everett Turnpike in Hooksett, NH | 1976 | current | |
| I-393 | 4.60 | 7.40 | I-93 in Concord, NH | NH 9 in Pembroke, NH | 1979 | current | Completely concurrent with US 4/US 202 |
| I-294 | 53.42 | 85.97 | I-80/I-94 in South Holland, IL | I-94 in Deerfield, IL | 1968 | current | |
| I-194 | 3.38 | 5.44 | I-94 in Battle Creek, MI | M-66 in Battle Creek, MI | 1961 | current | Concurrent with M-66 for its entire length |
| I-394 | 9.75 | 15.69 | I-494/US 12 in Minnetonka, MN | 4th Street in Minneapolis, MN | 1991 | current | |
| I-494 | 42.94 | 69.11 | I-94/I-694 in Maple Grove, MN | I-94/I-694 in Woodbury, MN | 1985 | current | Western and southern half of the Minneapolis–St. Paul beltway |
| I-694 | 30.77 | 49.52 | I-94/I-494 in Maple Grove, MN | I-94/I-494 in Woodbury, MN | 1970 | current | Northern and eastern half of the Minneapolis–St. Paul beltway |
| I-194 | 1.20 | 1.93 | McKenzie Drive near Bismarck, ND | I-94 near Mandan, ND | 1958 | current | Unsigned; part of the Bismarck Expressway |
| I-794 | 3.75 | 6.04 | I-43/I-94 in Milwaukee, WI | WIS 794 in Milwaukee, WI | 1980 | current | |
| I-894 | 9.92 | 15.96 | I-41/I-94 in Milwaukee, WI | I-41/I-43/I-94 in Milwaukee, WI | 1966 | current | Completely concurrent with I-41 |
| I-395 | 66.60 | 107.18 | I-95 in East Lyme, CT | I-290 in Auburn, MA | 1983 | current | |
| I-295 | 92.30 | 148.54 | I-95/I-495 in New Castle, DE | I-95 in Bristol Township, PA | 1994 | current | Extended into Pennsylvania in 2018 |
| I-495 | 11.47 | 18.46 | I-95/I-295 in Newport, DE | I-95 in Lower Chichester Township, PA | 1977 | current | |
| I-895 | 10.78 | 17.35 | Newport, DE | Claymont, DE | 1979 | 1980 | Now part of I-95 |
| I-195 | 2.41 | 3.88 | I-395 in Washington, DC | US 50 in Washington, DC | proposed | — | Currently I-395; I-395 will be rerouted onto I-695 |
| I-395 | 13.39 | 21.55 | I-95/I-495 in Springfield, VA | US 50 in Washington, DC | 1977 | current | Original route of I-95 that was proposed to continue through Washington, DC |
| I-495 | 64 | 103 | Beltway around Washington, DC | | 1961 | current | Capital Beltway; runs through Virginia, Maryland and a small sliver of Washington, DC, over the Wilson Bridge |
| I-695 | 2.00 | 3.22 | I-395 in Washington, DC | I-295 in Washington, DC | 1958 | current | Unsigned until 2011; future plans call for the route number to be replaced by an extension of I-395 |
| I-195 | 4.42 | 7.11 | I-95/SR 112 in Miami, FL | SR 905 in Miami Beach, FL | 1961 | current | |
| I-295 | 61.04 | 98.23 | Beltway around Jacksonville, FL | | 1970 | current | |
| I-395 | 1.29 | 2.08 | I-95 in Miami, FL | MacArthur Causeway at Watson Island, Miami, FL | 1971 | current | |
| I-595 | 12.86 | 20.70 | I-75/SR 869 in Weston, FL | US 1 in Fort Lauderdale, FL | 1990 | current | |
| I-795 | 7.4 | 11.9 | I-95 south of Jacksonville, FL | I-295 in Jacksonville, FL | proposed | — | Currently signed as SR 9B pending approval of the interstate designation from the AASHTO |
| I-195 | 1.55 | 2.49 | I-95/Maine Turnpike in Saco, ME | SR 5 in Saco, ME | 1980 | current | |
| I-295 | 53.11 | 85.47 | I-95/Maine Turnpike in Scarborough, ME | I-95/Maine Turnpike in Gardiner, ME | 1960 | current | |
| I-395 | 4.99 | 8.03 | I-95/US 2/SR 100 in Bangor, ME | US 1A in Brewer, ME | 2008 | current | |
| I-495 | 3.70 | 5.95 | I-95/Maine Turnpike in Portland, ME | I-295/US 1 in Falmouth, ME | 2004 | current | Unsigned, also designated as Falmouth Spur |
| I-195 | 4.71 | 7.58 | I-95/MD 166 near Catonsville, MD | Baltimore-Washington International Airport | 1990 | current | |
| I-395 | 1.98 | 3.19 | I-95 in South Baltimore, MD | West Pratt Street in Baltimore, MD | 1981 | current | |
| I-595 | 19.97 | 32.14 | I-95/I-495/US 50 near Washington, DC | US 50/US 301/MD 70 in Annapolis, MD | 2011 | current | Unsigned designation for US 50 |
| I-695 | 30.57 | 49.20 | MD 173 in Baltimore, MD | Broening Highway (MD 695A) in Dundalk, MD | 1958 | current | Beltway around Baltimore, MD; gap in route due to the collapse of the Francis Scott Key Bridge |
| I-795 | 8.99 | 14.47 | I-695 in Pikesville, MD | MD 140 in Reisterstown, MD | 1985 | current | |
| I-895 | 11.44 | 18.41 | I-95 near Elkridge, MD | I-95 in Baltimore, MD | 1979 | current | |
| I-295 | 8.05 | 12.96 | I-95/I-495 near Forest Heights, MD | I-695 in Washington, DC | 1964 | current | |
| I-195 | 44.55 | 71.70 | I-95 in Providence, RI | I-495/Route 25 in Wareham, MA | 1958 | current | |
| I-295 | 26.58 | 42.78 | I-95 in Warwick, RI | I-95 in Attleboro, MA | 1969 | current | |
| I-495 | 121.56 | 195.63 | I-195/Route 25 in Wareham, MA | I-95 in Salisbury, MA | 1957 | current | |
| I-695 | — | — | I-95 in Roxbury, MA | I-93 in Charlestown, MA | 1955 | 1971 | Canceled; was to have been built in connection with a planned alignment of I-95 through downtown Boston |
| I-895 | — | — | Route 37/I-295 in Cranston, RI | I-95/I-295 in Attleboro, MA | 1968 | 1982 | Canceled; would have supplemented I-295 to create a full Beltway around Providence, RI |
| I-195 | 34.17 | 54.99 | I-295 in Hamilton Township, NJ | Route 34 in Wall Township, NJ | 1968 | current | |
| I-895 | — | — | I-295 in Burlington, NJ | I-95 in Bristol, PA | 1963 | 1981 | Never built |
| I-295 | 9.79 | 15.76 | NY 25/NY 24 in Queens, NY | Bruckner Interchange in Bronx, NY | 1970 | current | |
| I-495 | 71.02 | 114.30 | Queens Midtown Tunnel in Manhattan, NY | CR 58 in Riverhead, NY | 1958 | current | |
| I-695 | 1.77 | 2.85 | I-95 in Bronx, NY | I-295 in Bronx, NY | 1986 | current | |
| I-895 | 1.12 | 1.80 | I-278 in Bronx, NY | I-95 in Bronx, NY | 1970 | 2017 | Downgraded to a boulevard and designated as NY 895 |
| I-295 | 34.0 | 54.7 | Cliffdale Road in Fayetteville, NC | I-95 and US 13 near Eastover, NC | 2019 | current | |
| I-495 | 4.10 | 6.60 | I-440/US 64/US 64 Bus. in Raleigh, NC | I-540/US 64/US 264 in Knightdale, NC | 2013 | 2017 | Now part of I-87; concurrent with US 64 |
| I-795 | 25.46 | 40.97 | US 70/US 117 in Goldsboro, NC | I-95/US 264 in Wilson, NC | 2007 | current | |
| I-695 | — | — | I-95 near Philadelphia International Airport | I-95 in Philadelphia, PA | 1964 | 1977 | Never built |
| I-195 | 3.24 | 5.21 | SR 195 in Richmond, VA | I-64/I-95 in Richmond, VA | 1970 | current | |
| I-295 | 52.56 | 84.59 | I-95 near Petersburg, VA | I-64 near Short Pump, VA | 1980 | current | |
| I-595 | — | — | I-395 near Arlington, VA | US 1 at Ronald Reagan Washington National Airport | — | — | Now part of US 1 |
| I-895 | — | — | I-95 near Richmond, VA | I-295 near Richmond, VA | 1996 | 2002 | Currently designated as SR 895, it was originally planned as an Interstate designation, but did not get approved by AASHTO |
| I-495 | — | — | — | — | 1956 | 1958 | Early number of I-476 |
| I-196 | 37.07 | 59.66 | US 31 in Norton Shores, MI | I-96/US 16 in Grand Rapids, MI | 1959 | 1963 | Now the western end of I-96 |
| I-196 | 80.65 | 129.79 | I-94/US 31 near Benton Harbor, MI | I-96/M-37 in Grand Rapids, MI | 1963 | current | |
| I-296 | 3.43 | 5.52 | I-196 in Grand Rapids, MI | I-96/M-37 in Walker, MI | 1962 | current | Unsigned since 1979 |
| I-496 | 11.78 | 18.96 | I-69/I-96 near Lansing, MI | I-96 and US 127 near Lansing, MI | 1970 | current | |
| I-696 | 29.39 | 47.30 | I-96/I-275 & M-5 in Novi, MI | I-94 in Roseville, MI | 1989 | current | |
| I-197 | 3.44 | 5.54 | — | — | — | c. 1980 | Replaced by I-595 |
| I-297 | — | — | — | — | — | 1987 | Withdrawn from request, replaced by MD 3 |
Former; Proposed and unbuilt
