= Cary, Maine =

- Township
- Location of Cary, Maine
- Coordinates: 45°59′43″N 67°51′43″W
- Country: United States
- State: Maine
- County: Aroostook

Area
  - Total: 18.8 sq mi (48.6 km^{2})
  - Land: 18.8 sq mi (48.6 km^{2})
  - Water: 0 sq mi (0 km^{2})
- Elevation: 449 ft (137 m)

Population (2010)
  - Total: 218
  - Density: 11.6/sq mi (4.49/km^{2})
- Time zone: UTC-5 (Eastern (EST))
  - Summer (DST): UTC-4 (EDT)
- ZIP code: 04471
- Area code: 207
- FIPS code: 23-11020
- GNIS feature ID: 582394

Cary is an unorganized township and former plantation in Aroostook County, Maine, United States, and is part of the unorganized territory of South Aroostook, Maine. As of the 2010 census, it had a population of 218.

== History ==
Cary was settled in 1824. It was organized as Plantation Number 11, Range 1 on June 30, 1859; this organization was made official by the legislature on February 21, 1878. It was organized as Cary Plantation on January 27, 1883; this organization was made official by the legislature on March 5, 1895.

In July 2015, Cary Plantation residents began a plan to deorganize and become residents of the Maine Unorganized Territory. However, in March 2016, the Maine Legislature rejected the plantation's application, citing the financial burden deorganization would add to the remaining municipalities in Aroostook County.

On October 3, 2017, residents again voted to deorganize, this time by a vote of 85 to 6, citing their rapidly increasing tax burden. The state legislature accepted their second deorganization proposal with an act that became law on April 21, 2018. On November 6, 2018, Cary residents voted to confirm the plantation's deorganization by a vote of 105 to 4. Cary became part of Maine's Unorganized Territory on July 1, 2019.

== Geography ==
According to the United States Census Bureau, the township has a total area of 18.8 square miles (48.6 km^{2}), all land.

== Demographics ==
Historical population
Census	Pop.	Note	%±
1890	390		—
1900	400		2.6%
1910	340		−15.0%
1920	327		−3.8%
1930	241		−26.3%
1940	287		19.1%
1950	278		−3.1%
1960	208		−25.2%
1970	184		−11.5%
1980	229		24.5%
1990	235		2.6%
2000	217		−7.7%
2010	218		0.5%
2019 (est.)	291		33.5%
U.S. Decennial Census

As of the census of 2000, there were 217 people, 90 households, and 66 families residing in the township. The population density was 11.4 inhabitants per square mile (4.4/km^{2}). There were 126 housing units at an average density of 6.6 per square mile (2.5/km^{2}). The racial makeup of the township was 96.77% White, 0.46% African American, 1.84% Native American and 0.92% Asian. Hispanic or Latino of any race were 1.38% of the population.

There were 90 households, out of which 25.6% had children under the age of 18 living with them, 66.7% were married couples living together, 3.3% had a female householder with no husband present, and 25.6% were non-families. 21.1% of all households were made up of individuals, and 11.1% had someone living alone who was 65 years of age or older. The average household size was 2.41 and the average family size was 2.75.

In the township the population was spread out, with 19.8% under the age of 18, 8.3% from 18 to 24, 26.7% from 25 to 44, 30.0% from 45 to 64, and 15.2% who were 65 years of age or older. The median age was 43 years. For every 100 females, there were 104.7 males. For every 100 females age 18 and over, there were 107.1 males.

The median income for a household in the township was $29,500, and the median income for a family was $40,000. Males had a median income of $26,563 versus $19,375 for females. The per capita income for the township was $15,172. About 9.1% of families and 14.1% of the population were below the poverty line, including 20.0% of those under the age of 18 and 17.5% of those 65 or over.
