= Interstate 195 (Maine) =

Highway in Maine

Interstate 195
- Saco Industrial Spur
- I-195 highlighted in red

Route information
- Auxiliary route of I-95
- Maintained by MaineDOT
- Length: 1.55 mi (2.49 km)
- Existed: 1980–present
- NHS: Entire route

Major junctions
- West end: I-95 / Maine Turnpike in Saco
- US 1 / SR 5 in Saco
- East end: SR 5 in Saco

Location
- Country: United States
- State: Maine
- Counties: York

Highway system
- Interstate Highway System; Main; Auxiliary; Suffixed; Business; Future; Maine State Highway System; Interstate; US; State; Auto trails; Lettered highways
← SR 194	→ SR 195

Interstate 195 (I-195), also known as the Saco Industrial Spur, is a short auxiliary Interstate Highway running 1.55 miles (2.49 km) in eastern York County, Maine. The highway, located entirely in the city of Saco, is a nominally east–west route that provides access to downtown Saco and the resort town of Old Orchard Beach from I-95 (Maine Turnpike). The western terminus of I-195 is at a trumpet interchange with the Maine Turnpike in central Saco. The route has numbered interchanges with Industrial Park Road, US Route 1 (US 1), and State Route 5 (SR 5) before terminating at an at-grade intersection with SR 5 near the border between Saco and Old Orchard Beach.

The western terminus with I-95 has the remnants of an abandoned clover ramp, and the eastbound I-195 bridge is wide enough for two lanes and a shoulder but only has one lane. These hinted at a possible future extension westward but is less probable with the recent construction of a subdivision due west of the interchange.

== Route description ==
I-195 begins at a trumpet interchange with I-95 (Maine Turnpike) in Saco, a city in York County; the freeway is accessible from I-95 via exit 36. After the interchange with I-95, I-195 begins to head in a southeastern direction. The freeway passes over an industrial branch of CSX Transportation just before a tollbooth for the entrance to the Maine Turnpike. After the toll barrier, I-195 enters the Saco Industrial Park and interchanges with Industrial Park Road, a local road that is used to access SR 112. The junction, signed as exit 1, is a partial cloverleaf interchange.

After exit 1, I-195 turns slightly to the south, passing through a densely forested region in eastern Saco. After turning again to head in a southeastern direction, I-195 interchanges with US 1 and SR 5 at a partial cloverleaf interchange signed as exits 2A and 2B. Exit 2A serves US 1 south and SR 5 north, which run concurrently into downtown Saco. Exit 2B serves US 1 north, locally known as the Blue Star Memorial Highway, which serves northern Saco and the town of Scarborough. There is no access to SR 5 south from I-195, and no access from either US 1 or SR 5 onto eastbound I-195.

After exit 2B, I-195 continues eastward for another 0.83 miles (1.34 km) before terminating at an at-grade intersection with SR 5 on the border between Saco and the town of Old Orchard Beach. The mainline of I-195 east defaults onto SR 5 south, which heads in an eastern direction into downtown Old Orchard Beach. There is no access from I-195 east to SR 5 north or from SR 5 south onto I-195 west.

== History ==
The origins of I-195 date back to the 1950s, when a freeway in Saco was planned as one of the state's original Interstate Highways, along with I-95 and I-295. Construction, however, was delayed for nearly three decades as the state finished construction projects on I-95, I-295, and the originally unsigned portion of the Maine Turnpike. In 1980, construction on I-195 began; the freeway was reenvisioned as a link to the Saco Industrial Park and the resort town of Old Orchard Beach and was named the Saco Industrial Spur.

In 1982, two years after construction began, the Maine Department of Transportation (MaineDOT) opened a one-mile (1.6 km) segment of I-195 from the interchange with Industrial Park Road at exit 1 to the Interstate's eastern terminus at SR 5. Construction west of Industrial Park Road required the demolition of an existing partial cloverleaf interchange off the Maine Turnpike that connected to SR 112. The second segment of the freeway, which also included the construction of a new trumpet interchange with the Maine Turnpike and a toll barrier, opened in 1983. The Maine Turnpike Authority announced plans to reestablish an exit to SR 112 at the location of the demolished trumpet interchange in order to relieve traffic congestion by traffic using I-195 to get to SR 112. This traffic often backs up to the turnpike mainline, creating a hazard with stopped traffic next to 75 mph (121 km/h) traffic. Construction is expected to begin in 2023. Extending I-195 westward to meet SR 112 was considered but rejected due to cost and the amount of private property needing to be taken for such a project.

An estimated daily average of over 20,000 motorists utilized I-195 in 2005.

== Exit list ==
The entire route is in Saco, York County.

mi	km	Exit	Destinations	Notes
0.00	0.00	–	I-95 / Maine Turnpike – Portland, Kittery	Western terminus; exit 36 on I-95 / Turnpike
0.36	0.58	Toll plaza (westbound only)		
0.49	0.79	1	Industrial Park Road to SR 112	Last westbound exit before toll
1.56	2.51	2	US 1 (Portland Road) / SR 5 north – Saco, Downtown Saco	No eastbound entrance; western end of SR 5 concurrency; SR 5 not signed eastbound; signed as exits 2A (US 1 south/SR 5) and 2B (US 1 north)
2.41	3.88	–	SR 5 south – Old Orchard Beach	Continuation south; eastern end of SR 5 concurrency
1.000 mi = 1.609 km; 1.000 km = 0.621 mi: Concurrency terminus; Incomplete access; Tolled
