= Falmouth Spur =

Highway in Maine

Interstate 495
- Falmouth Spur
- Falmouth Spur highlighted in red

Route information
- Auxiliary route of I-95
- Maintained by MTA
- Length: 4.3 mi (6.9 km)
- Existed: 1955–present
- NHS: Entire route

Major junctions
- West end: I-95 / Maine Turnpike in Portland
- East end: I-295 / US 1 in Falmouth

Location
- Country: United States
- State: Maine
- Counties: Cumberland

Highway system
- Interstate Highway System; Main; Auxiliary; Suffixed; Business; Future; Maine State Highway System; Interstate; US; State; Auto trails; Lettered highways
← I-395	→ US 1

The Falmouth Spur is a short freeway connecting Interstate 95 (I-95) with I-295 and US Route 1 (US 1) north of Portland, Maine, in the United States. It carries the unsigned designation of Interstate 495 (I-495). As part of the Maine Turnpike, the mainline of which carries I-95, the Falmouth Spur is a toll road. The spur has only two interchanges—one at each end—and a toll booth in the middle. It is signed only for its destinations—I-95, I-295, and US 1—to minimize driver confusion.

Prior to January 2004, the Falmouth Spur carried I-95 from the Maine Turnpike mainline to the spur's eastern terminus, where I-95 continued north along present-day I-295. In 2004, I-95 was rerouted to follow the entire length of the turnpike in order to reduce confusion. Most of the former I-95 between Portland and Augusta became an extension of I-295, while the short Falmouth Spur was given the unsigned I-495 designation.

Destinations on signs (control cities) on the Falmouth Spur are the same as when it was part of I-95—Falmouth and Freeport for eastbound traffic from I-95 and Lewiston and Kittery (one for each direction of the turnpike) for westbound traffic from US 1. Signs on I-295 southbound point traffic for New Hampshire, Massachusetts, and "points south" along the spur.

Manual on Uniform Traffic Control Devices-compliant milemarkers proceed easterly from the western end with the letters FS (for Falmouth Spur) horizontally on a line below the word "MILE" and range from 0 to 3.

== Route description ==
The Falmouth Spur begins in the northwestern edge of Portland at a trumpet interchange with I-95 (Maine Turnpike) at exit 52. It heads east as a four-lane controlled-access highway, passing under State Route 100 (SR 100) with no access. The spur then crosses the Presumpscot River and passes under Falmouth Road. Running through wooded areas, the highway approaches the Falmouth toll barrier, which charges $1.00 for passenger vehicles. One express E-ZPass lane and two conventional toll lanes are provided in each direction. After the toll plaza, the Falmouth Spur passes under SR 9 and reaches its eastern terminus at I-295 and US 1. There is no exit from the Falmouth Spur to I-295 southbound nor is there an entrance from I-295 northbound.

== History ==
The Falmouth Spur was built as part of the second phase—Portland to Augusta—of the Maine Turnpike, opened December 13, 1955, as well to alleviate traffic on Falmouth Road, the town's east to west connector, connecting SR 9 (Middle Road) with SR 26/SR 100 (Gray Road). The spur connected exit 8, a trumpet interchange with the mainline turnpike, with exit 9, another trumpet at US 1 in Falmouth. (The west end later became exit 9—exit 8 was moved south to the new Westbrook interchange—and the east end became exit 15 on I-95.) The tollbooth was just west of US 1, right where the spur now crosses over I-295. The part of US 1 that it connected to had been built c. 1948 as a realignment (old US 1 is SR 88), and the spur connected the turnpike, which headed inland at Portland, with US 1, a major route to and beyond Brunswick via the shore.

When the Interstate Highway System was designed in the 1940s and 1950s, the main route along the East Coast, numbered I-95 in 1957, was assigned to the route via Brunswick to Augusta. Thus, the Falmouth Spur became I-95, and the turnpike was unnumbered between the spur and Gardiner. Around 1960, the piece of I-95 (now I-295) north of the spur was completed, and a partial interchange was added at its crossing with the spur. The tollbooth was moved west at that time.

The turnpike stayed unnumbered between Falmouth and Gardiner until around 1988, when it was added to the Interstate System as I-495. This allowed it to have a speed limit higher than the National Maximum Speed Limit of 55 mph (89 km/h), as per the Surface Transportation and Uniform Relocation Assistance Act.

In 2002, the Maine Department of Transportation (MaineDOT) submitted a proposal to the American Association of State Highway and Transportation Officials (AASHTO) to relocate I-95 along I-495 and extend I-295 along I-95 to Gardiner, leaving the Falmouth Spur unnumbered. This was approved by AASHTO on November 5, 2002, with one change—the Falmouth Spur was assigned the I-495 designation. The MaineDOT and Maine Turnpike Authority (MTA) decided not to sign or publicize I-495 to minimize confusion; maps of the changes distributed to the public included the remark "existing I-95 becomes a ramp" or just "Falmouth Spur" pointing to the spur. Signs were changed from January 5 to 10, 2004. A prominent sign was posted near the New Hampshire state line informing travelers of the change and that the information center had new maps.

== Exit list ==
The entire route is in Cumberland County. All exits are unnumbered.

Location	mi	km	Destinations	Notes
Portland	0.00	0.00	I-95 / Maine Turnpike – Portland, Kittery, Auburn, Lewiston	Western terminus; exit 52 on I-95 / Turnpike
Falmouth	2.79	4.49	Falmouth Toll Barrier	
Falmouth	4.04– 4.10	6.50– 6.60	US 1 to I-295 south – Falmouth, Portland, Yarmouth	Eastbound exit and westbound entrance
Falmouth	4.36	7.02	I-295 north – Freeport, Brunswick	Eastern terminus; exit 11 on I-295
1.000 mi = 1.609 km; 1.000 km = 0.621 mi: Incomplete access; Tolled
