= South Aroostook, Maine =

- Unorganized territory
- Location of South Aroostook, Maine
- Coordinates: 45°49′32″N 68°12′47″W
- Country: United States
- State: Maine
- County: Aroostook

Area
  - Total: 368.5 sq mi (954.4 km^{2})
  - Land: 357.2 sq mi (925.1 km^{2})
  - Water: 11.3 sq mi (29.2 km^{2})
- Elevation: 600 ft (180 m)

Population (2020)
  - Total: 579
  - Density: 1.62/sq mi (0.626/km^{2})
- Time zone: UTC-5 (Eastern (EST))
  - Summer (DST): UTC-4 (EDT)
- Area code: 207
- FIPS code: 23-69930
- GNIS feature ID: 582731

South Aroostook is an unorganized territory in Aroostook County, Maine, United States. The population was 579 at the 2020 census.

== Geography ==
According to the United States Census Bureau, the unorganized territory has a total area of 368.5 square miles (954.4 km^{2}), of which 357.2 square miles (925.1 km^{2}) is land and 11.3 square miles (29.2 km^{2}), or 3.06%, is water.

There are 13 townships in the unorganized territory, including Molunkus, Benedicta, Silver Ridge, Bancroft, Upper Molunkus, North Yarmouth Academy Grant, Forkstown, and Bragg Tract.

== Demographics ==
Historical population
Census	Pop.	Note	%±
1970	243		—
1980	261		7.4%
1990	404		54.8%
2000	486		20.3%
2010	386		−20.6%
2020	579		50.0%
U.S. Decennial Census

South Aroostook experienced a 50% growth in population for the 2020 census, largely due to the addition in 2019 of the former plantation of Cary, which had a population of 218 as of the 2010 census.

As of the 2000 census, there were 486 people, 188 households, and 134 families living in the unorganized territory. The population density was 1.4 people per square mile (0.54 people/km^{2}). There were 471 housing units, at an average density of 1.3 per square mile (0.50/km^{2}). The racial makeup was 99.79% White and 0.21% Black or African American.

There were 188 households, of which 29.8% had children under the age of 18 living with them, 62.2% were married couples living together, 3.2% had a female householder with no husband present, and 28.7% were non-families. In the unorganized territory, 18.6% of all households were made up of individuals, and 9.6% had someone living alone who was 65 years of age or older. The average household size was 2.58, and the average family size was 3.03.

In the unorganized territory, 25.3% of the population were under the age of 18, 6.8% were 18 to 24, 25.5% were 25 to 44, 28.0% were 45 to 64, and 14.4% were 65 or older. The median age was 42 years. For every 100 females, there were 102.5 males. For every 100 females age 18 and over, there were 103.9 males.

The median income for a household in the unorganized territory was $28,750, and the median income for a family was $34,167. Males had a median income of $32,222 versus $28,125 for females. The per capita income for the unorganized territory was $13,718. About 9.6% of families and 14.6% of the population were below the poverty line, including 15.0% of those under age 18 and 21.3% of those age 65 or over.

== History ==
Bishop Benedict Joseph Fenwick founded Benedicta in 1834 as a colony of Irish Catholics from Boston. They began arriving in 1838 and built a small village surrounding St. Benedict Church. Fenwick later considered Benedicta as a home for the planned College of the Holy Cross, but settled on Worcester, Massachusetts, instead.

== Education ==
The Maine Department of Education takes responsibility for coordinating school assignments in the unorganized territory. As of 2025 it states it assigns areas in Benedicta to Regional School Unit 50 (Southern Aroostook Community Schools) and then it lists Katahdin Elementary School and Katahdin Middle/High School, which are both operated by Regional School Unit 89.

The state department of education previously operated Benedicta Elementary School in Benedicta Township. It was a Pre-Kindergarten through seventh grade in 2007, but was scheduled to have the seventh grade eliminated. In 2007 its enrollment was 20. In 2007, the director of education in the unorganized territories, Richard Moreau, was to announce that the school will be closed after the 2008-2009 school year as costs and lower numbers of students were issues. The school closed, and, by 2011, had been sold by the state.
