= Kittery (CDP), Maine =

Kittery, Maine
- Census-designated place
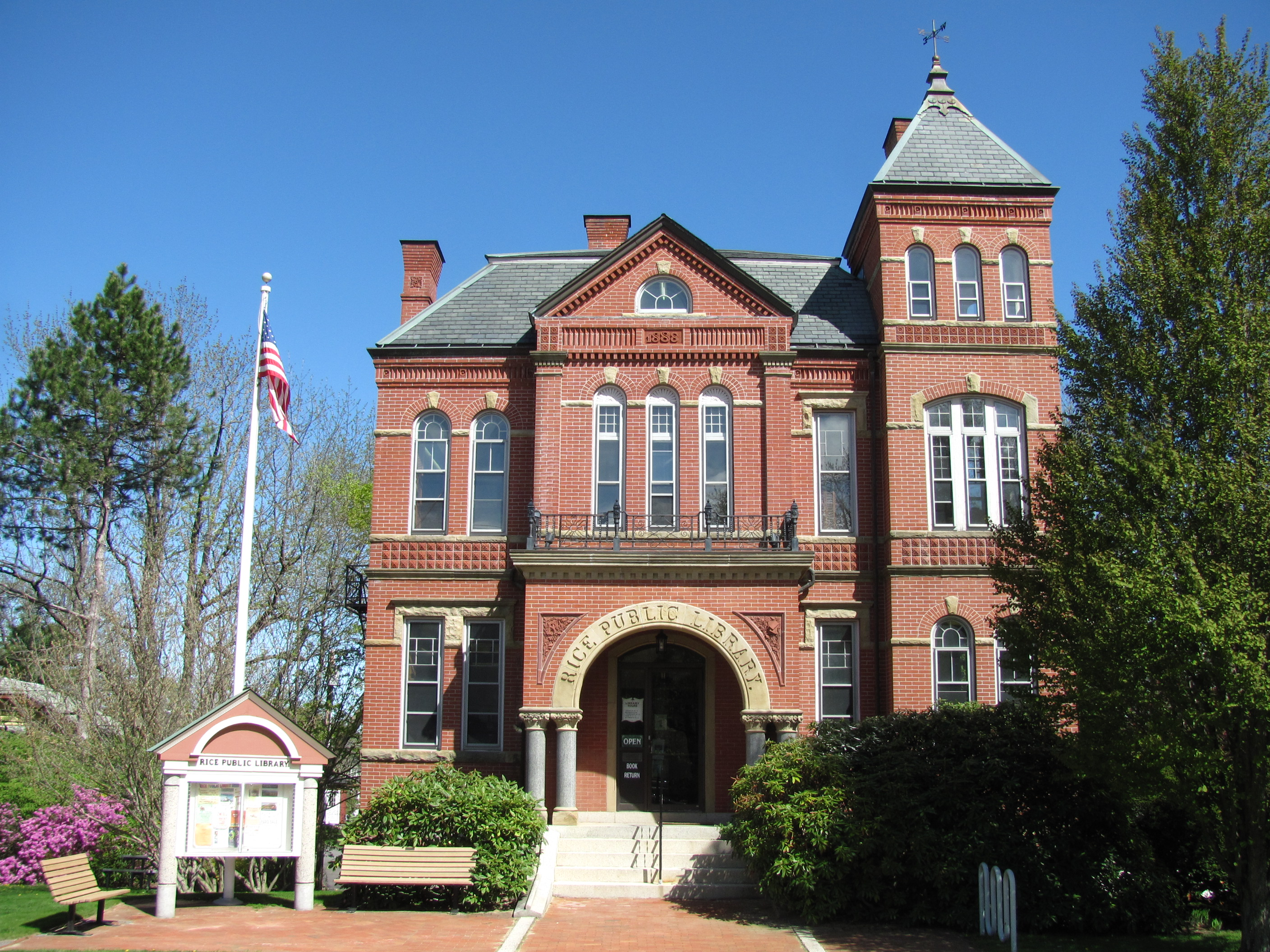
- Rice Public Library

- Location within the state of Maine
- Coordinates: 43°05′32″N 70°44′45″W
- Country: United States
- State: Maine
- County: York

Area
  - Total: 3.53 sq mi (9.14 km^{2})
  - Land: 2.80 sq mi (7.25 km^{2})
  - Water: 0.73 sq mi (1.89 km^{2})
- Elevation: 66 ft (20 m)

Population (2020)
  - Total: 4,973
  - Density: 1,776.4/sq mi (685.88/km^{2})
- Time zone: UTC-5 (Eastern (EST))
  - Summer (DST): UTC-4 (EDT)
- ZIP code: 03904
- Area code: 207
- FIPS code: 23-37235
- GNIS feature ID: 2377922

Kittery is a census-designated place (CDP) consisting of the main village in the town of Kittery in York County, Maine, United States. The village is also known as Kittery Foreside. The population of the CDP was 4,562 at the 2010 census. It is part of the Portland–South Portland–Biddeford, Maine Metropolitan Statistical Area.

== Geography ==
According to the United States Census Bureau, the CDP has a total area of 3.6 square miles (9.2 km^{2}), of which 2.8 square miles (7.3 km^{2}) is land and 0.8 square miles (2.0 km^{2}) (21.07%) is water.

== Demographics ==
Historical population
Census	Pop.	Note	%±
2020	4,973		—
U.S. Decennial Census

At the 2000 census, there were 4,884 people, 2,085 households and 1,221 families residing in the CDP. The population density was 1,737.1 inhabitants per square mile (670.7/km^{2}). There were 2,207 housing units at an average density of 785.0 per square mile (303.1/km^{2}). The racial makeup of the CDP was 94.06% White, 2.74% Black or African American, 0.23% Native American, 0.80% Asian, 0.04% Pacific Islander, 0.82% from other races, and 1.31% from two or more races. Hispanic or Latino of any race were 2.33% of the population.

There were 2,085 households, of which 28.7% had children under the age of 18 living with them, 47.6% were married couples living together, 8.0% had a female householder with no husband present, and 41.4% were non-families. 31.9% of all households were made up of individuals, and 11.7% had someone living alone who was 65 years of age or older. The average household size was 2.27 and the average family size was 2.92.

Age distribution was 22.1% under the age of 18, 10.0% from 18 to 24, 34.1% from 25 to 44, 20.2% from 45 to 64, and 13.6% who were 65 years of age or older. The median age was 35 years. For every 100 females, there were 99.2 males. For every 100 females age 18 and over, there were 96.6 males.

The median household income was $40,510, and the median family income was $52,532. Males had a median income of $35,850 versus $27,198 for females. The per capita income for the CDP was $22,451. About 4.4% of families and 6.3% of the population were below the poverty line, including 6.6% of those under age 18 and 7.5% of those age 65 or over
