= Hampden (CDP), Maine =

Hampden, Maine
- Census-designated place
- Location within Maine Location within the United States
- Coordinates: 44°45′25″N 68°49′46″W
- Country: United States
- State: Maine
- County: Penobscot

Area
  - Total: 11.63 sq mi (30.12 km^{2})
  - Land: 10.96 sq mi (28.39 km^{2})
  - Water: 0.67 sq mi (1.73 km^{2})
- Elevation: 75 ft (23 m)

Population (2020)
  - Total: 4,516
  - Density: 412.0/sq mi (159.06/km^{2})
- Time zone: UTC-5 (Eastern (EST))
  - Summer (DST): UTC-4 (EDT)
- ZIP code: 04444
- Area code: 207
- FIPS code: 23-30760
- GNIS feature ID: 2377916
- Website: www.hampdenmaine.com

Hampden is a census-designated place (CDP) consisting of the eastern portion of the town of Hampden in Penobscot County, Maine, United States. The population of the CDP was 4,343 at the 2010 census.

== Geography ==
According to the United States Census Bureau, the CDP has a total area of 11.6 square miles (30.1 km^{2}), of which 11.0 square miles (28.4 km^{2}) is land and 0.66 square miles (1.7 km^{2}), or 5.75%, is water.

== Demographics ==
Historical population
Census	Pop.	Note	%±
2020	4,516		—
U.S. Decennial Census

As of the census of 2000, there were 4,126 people, 1,632 households, and 1,152 families residing in the CDP. The population density was 372.6 inhabitants per square mile (143.9/km^{2}). There were 1,704 housing units at an average density of 153.9 per square mile (59.4/km^{2}). The racial makeup of the CDP was 97.87% White, 0.44% Black or African American, 0.48% Native American, 0.61% Asian, 0.15% from other races, and 0.46% from two or more races. Hispanic or Latino of any race were 0.46% of the population.

There were 1,632 households, out of which 36.0% had children under the age of 18 living with them, 57.2% were married couples living together, 10.5% had a female householder with no husband present, and 29.4% were non-families. 23.2% of all households were made up of individuals, and 9.9% had someone living alone who was 65 years of age or older. The average household size was 2.53 and the average family size was 3.00.

In the CDP, the population was spread out, with 27.1% under the age of 18, 6.2% from 18 to 24, 28.9% from 25 to 44, 25.6% from 45 to 64, and 12.2% who were 65 years of age or older. The median age was 39 years. For every 100 females, there were 91.5 males. For every 100 females age 18 and over, there were 86.1 males.

The median income for a household in the CDP was $53,333, and the median income for a family was $63,417. Males had a median income of $46,230 versus $28,728 for females. The per capita income for the CDP was $24,976. About 2.4% of families and 3.9% of the population were below the poverty line, including 4.6% of those under age 18 and 4.9% of those age 65 or over.
