= Patten, Maine =

Town in Maine, United States

- Town
- Location within Maine Location within the United States
- Coordinates: 45°59′44″N 68°29′53″W
- Country: United States
- State: Maine
- County: Penobscot

Area
  - Total: 38.25 sq mi (99.07 km^{2})
  - Land: 38.19 sq mi (98.91 km^{2})
  - Water: 0.062 sq mi (0.16 km^{2})
- Elevation: 653 ft (199 m)

Population (2020)
  - Total: 881
  - Density: 23/sq mi (8.9/km^{2})
- Time zone: UTC-5 (Eastern (EST))
  - Summer (DST): UTC-4 (EDT)
- ZIP Codes: 04765 (Patten); 04777 (Stacyville)
- Area code: 207
- FIPS code: 23-57150
- GNIS feature ID: 582666
- Website: www.pattenmaine.org

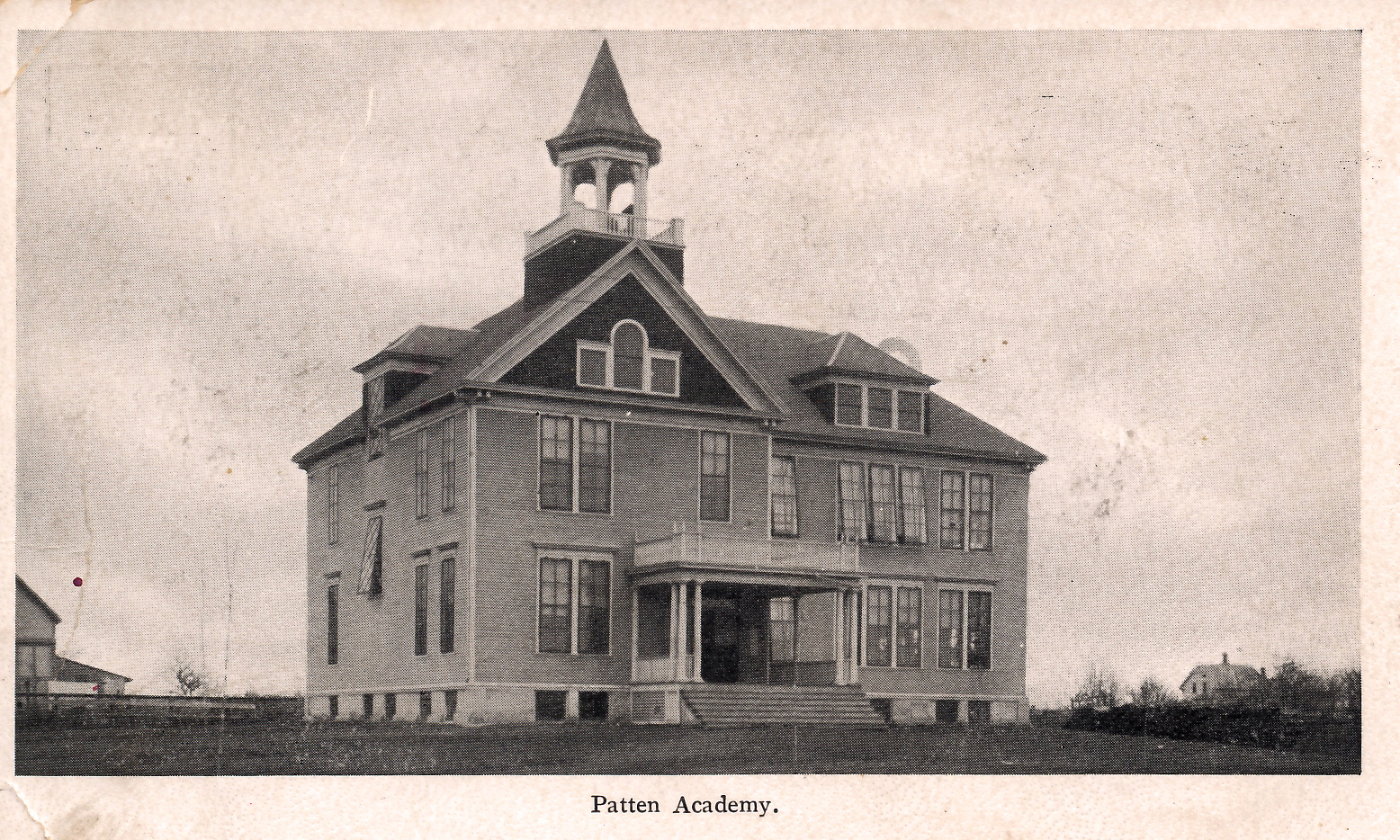
Postcard depicting Patten Academy ca. 1905.

Patten is a small town in Penobscot County, Maine, United States. At the 2020 census, the population was 881. The village of Patten is in the northeastern part of the town.

== History ==
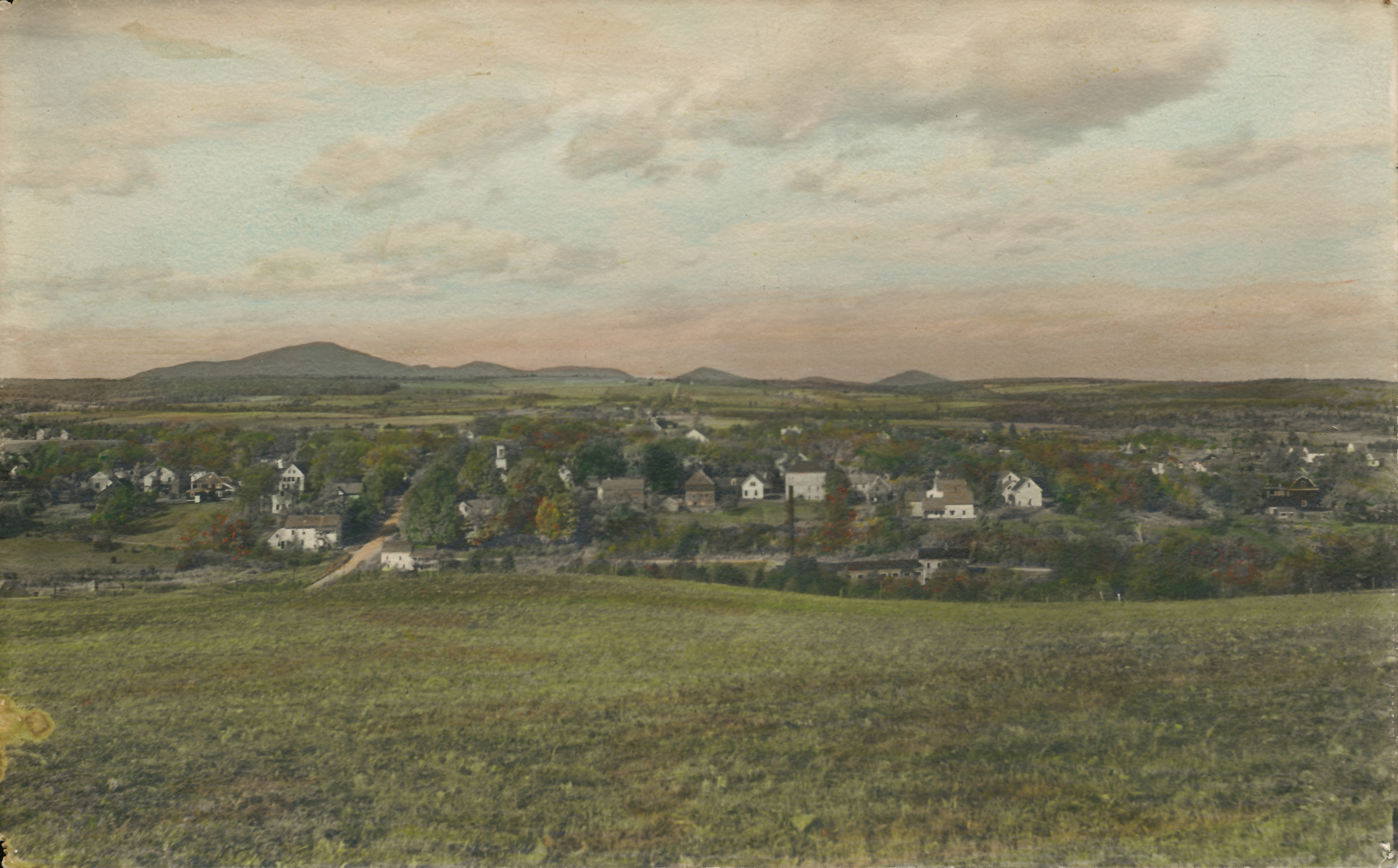
Patten ME from Finch Hill. Hand colored photograph taken c. 1880.

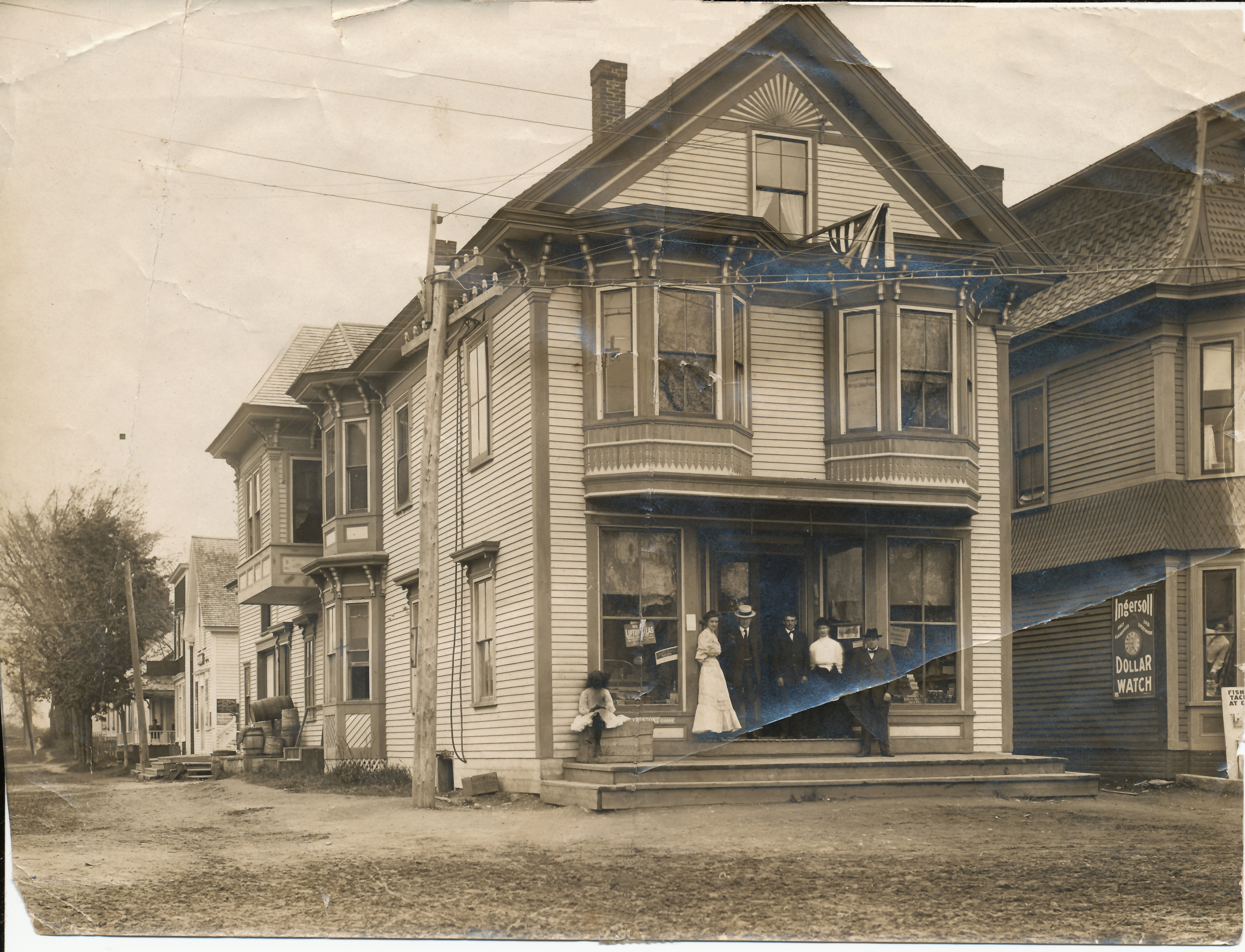
Patten Drug Store in Patten, Maine, at corner of Main and Katahdin Streets. Taken c. 1880.

The town was named for Amos Patten, a resident of Bangor, Maine, who about 1828 purchased Township No. 4, Range 6, as it was then designated, for its vast timber supply. In 1829 Amos Patten hired Ira Fish and Eli Kellogg to survey the land. The surveyors soon asked permission to establish their homes in Patten. The town was incorporated on April 16, 1841, and given its present name at that time. By 1850 the population numbered 470, reaching 704 in 1870, and 716 residents in 1880. The town's infrastructure gradually appeared. In March 1841 the Congregational Church was organized. Within a few years, citizens began agitating for local education. A bill to appoint Trustees of the Patten Academy passed the Maine legislature and was signed by the governor in 1847. The Patten Academy opened its doors with 61 students in September 1848, and educated its residents for more than a century.

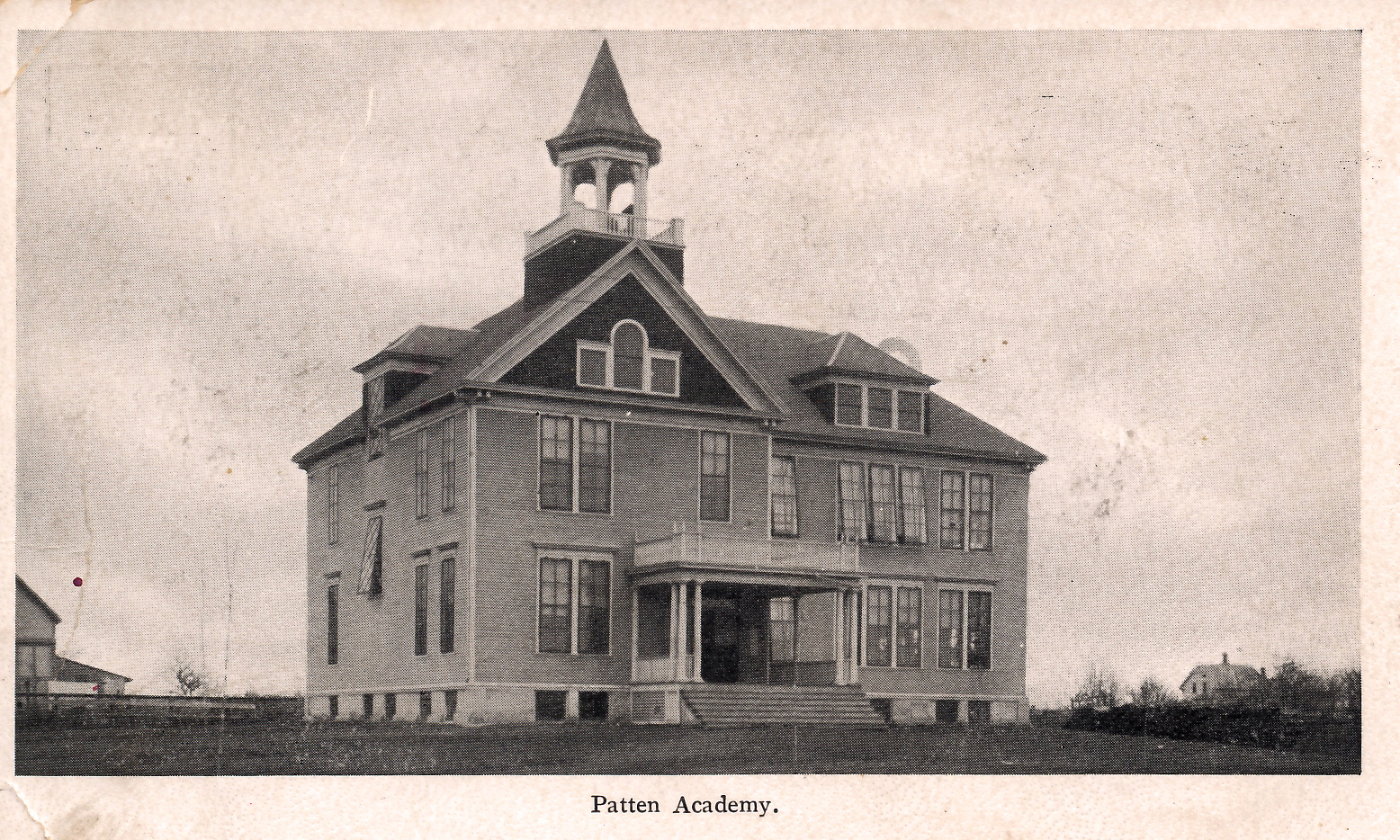
Patten Academy in 1905

Two factors explain Patten's comparatively early development, and its position as the major town of the Penobscot panhandle and southwestern Aroostook in the nineteenth century. First, it is the first town beyond the Mount Katahdin range, giving it access to the upper East Branch and lower Allagash River basins, which were leading lumbering areas. Its close proximity to several major rivers and streams allowed abundant water power but did not favor the development of large-scale industry, Small mills and workshops utilized its power during most of the town's history.

Second, it has the best agricultural land in the proximity of those basins. As a result, lumbering stimulated very early development of commerce and farming; and the town early gained the status as the distribution center and cultural nexus of all the towns west of Houlton and north of Lincoln. It is situated at the intersection of Maine Rte. 11 and Maine State Route 159.

The six buildings of the Bradford Farm (1840) in Patten are listed on the National Register of Historic Places, and are now occupied by the Bradford House Bed & Breakfast Inn.

== Geography ==
Patten lies on the western edge of the Mattawamkeag River system basin, almost at the edge of the East Branch of the Penobscot River's basin. Two major Mattawamkeag tributaries occupy its area: in the north, Fish Stream (formerly known as the "Mattawamkeag West Branch"), and in the south, small feeders of Molunkus Stream. Fish Stream is navigable by very small craft as far as Island Falls, approximately 10 miles (16 km) distance, for about six months of the year. In the early days of lumbering, it was used to drive local cutting downstream, eventually to the mills at Old Town and Bangor.

According to the United States Census Bureau, the town has a total area of 38.25 square miles (99.07 km^{2}), of which 38.19 square miles (98.91 km^{2}) is land and 0.06 square miles (0.16 km^{2}) is water.

=== Climate ===
This climatic region is typified by large seasonal temperature differences, with warm to hot (and often humid) summers and cold (sometimes severely cold) winters. According to the Köppen Climate Classification system, Patten has a humid continental climate, abbreviated "Dfb" on climate maps.

Climate data for Patten 2, Maine, 1991–2020 normals, extremes 1902–1930, 1965–1980, 1985–2017: 820ft (250m)
Month	Jan	Feb	Mar	Apr	May	Jun	Jul	Aug	Sep	Oct	Nov	Dec	Year
Record high °F (°C)	53 (12)	65 (18)	78 (26)	88 (31)	96 (36)	100 (38)	100 (38)	98 (37)	93 (34)	86 (30)	70 (21)	59 (15)	100 (38)
Mean daily maximum °F (°C)	22.1 (−5.5)	25.4 (−3.7)	34.5 (1.4)	47.8 (8.8)	62.2 (16.8)	71.7 (22.1)	76.1 (24.5)	75.2 (24.0)	67.1 (19.5)	53.5 (11.9)	40.6 (4.8)	28.8 (−1.8)	50.4 (10.2)
Daily mean °F (°C)	12.7 (−10.7)	15.6 (−9.1)	25.1 (−3.8)	38.2 (3.4)	51.2 (10.7)	60.4 (15.8)	65.7 (18.7)	64.3 (17.9)	56.3 (13.5)	44.1 (6.7)	32.7 (0.4)	20.9 (−6.2)	40.6 (4.8)
Mean daily minimum °F (°C)	3.3 (−15.9)	5.9 (−14.5)	15.6 (−9.1)	28.6 (−1.9)	40.2 (4.6)	49.2 (9.6)	55.2 (12.9)	53.5 (11.9)	45.4 (7.4)	34.8 (1.6)	24.9 (−3.9)	13.0 (−10.6)	30.8 (−0.7)
Record low °F (°C)	−35 (−37)	−36 (−38)	−28 (−33)	−3 (−19)	18 (−8)	21 (−6)	34 (1)	29 (−2)	20 (−7)	10 (−12)	−11 (−24)	−35 (−37)	−36 (−38)
Average precipitation inches (mm)	3.28 (83)	2.57 (65)	3.07 (78)	3.85 (98)	4.02 (102)	3.81 (97)	4.08 (104)	3.99 (101)	4.02 (102)	4.27 (108)	4.38 (111)	3.69 (94)	45.03 (1,143)
Source 1: NOAA (precipitation 1981–2010)
Source 2: XMACIS2

== Demographics ==
Historical population
Census	Pop.	Note	%±
1850	470		—
1860	639		36.0%
1870	704		10.2%
1880	716		1.7%
1890	936		30.7%
1900	1,172		25.2%
1910	1,406		20.0%
1920	1,498		6.5%
1930	1,278		−14.7%
1940	1,548		21.1%
1950	1,536		−0.8%
1960	1,312		−14.6%
1970	1,266		−3.5%
1980	1,368		8.1%
1990	1,256		−8.2%
2000	1,111		−11.5%
2010	1,017		−8.5%
2020	881		−13.4%
U.S. Decennial Census

As of 2000 the median income for a household in the town was $26,900, and the median income for a family was $35,000. Males had a median income of $27,656 versus $15,987 for females. The per capita income for the town was $14,384. About 12.4% of families and 17.9% of the population were below the poverty line, including 23.1% of those under age 18 and 16.4% of those age 65 or over.

=== 2010 census ===
As of the census of 2010, there were 1,017 people, 447 households, and 283 families residing in the town. The population density was 26.6 inhabitants per square mile (10.3/km^{2}). There were 565 housing units at an average density of 14.8 per square mile (5.7/km^{2}). The racial makeup of the town was 98.9% White, 0.1% Native American, 0.1% Asian, and 0.9% from two or more races. Hispanic or Latino of any race were 0.1% of the population.

There were 447 households, of which 25.3% had children under the age of 18 living with them, 50.8% were married couples living together, 7.4% had a female householder with no husband present, 5.1% had a male householder with no wife present, and 36.7% were non-families. 32.4% of all households were made up of individuals, and 16.5% had someone living alone who was 65 years of age or older. The average household size was 2.20 and the average family size was 2.73.

The median age in the town was 47.6 years. 19.6% of residents were under the age of 18; 5% were between the ages of 18 and 24; 20.9% were from 25 to 44; 31.7% were from 45 to 64; and 22.8% were 65 years of age or older. The gender makeup of the town was 48.9% male and 51.1% female.

== Notable people ==
- Gladys George (1900–1954), stage and film actress
- Enock Glidden, adaptive athlete and Adaptive Sports advocate
- Lore Alford Rogers (1875–1975), dairy scientist and bacteriologist
- Lou Rogers (Annie L. Rogers) (1879–1952) cartoonist and writer
