= East Branch Mattawamkeag River =

- Location within Maine

Location
- Country: United States

Physical characteristics
- Source
  - location: Maine
  - elevation: 710 feet (220 m)
- Mouth
  - location: Mattawamkeag River
  - coordinates: 45°50′02″N 67°59′27″W
  - elevation: 365 feet (111 m)
- Length: 36 miles (58 km)

Basin features
- Progression: Mattawamkeag River – Penobscot River

The East Branch Mattawamkeag River is a tributary of the Mattawamkeag River in Aroostook County, Maine. From its source (46°13′51″N 68°08′53″W) in Dudley (Maine Township 7, Range 3, WELS), the river runs 36 miles (58 km) south and southeast to its confluence with the West Branch Mattawamkeag River in Haynesville, about 10 miles (16 km) west of the Canada–United States border.

== Pleasant Lake ==
Pleasant Lake
- Location within Maine
- Location: Aroostook County, Maine
- Coordinates: 46°01′N 68°10′W
- Basin countries: United States
- Max. length: 4 mi (6.4 km)
- Max. width: 1 mi (1.6 km)
- Surface area: 1,817 acres (735 ha)
- Max. depth: 63 feet (19 m)
- Water volume: 57,966 acre⋅ft (71,500,000 m^{3})
- Surface elevation: 535 ft (163 m)

Pleasant Lake is the largest lake in the East Branch watershed. The lake extends from the northeast corner of Island Falls into the northwest corner of Maine township 4, range 3. The western edge of the lake overflows 500 yards (460 m) into the East Branch 5 miles (8.0 km) downstream of Oakfield. The lake supports populations of smallmouth bass and rainbow smelt, and is stocked with brook trout and land-locked Atlantic salmon. There is an unimproved boat launch area at the western end of the lake.

== See also ==
- List of rivers of Maine
