= Island Falls =

Island Falls may refer to:

- Island Falls, Maine, a town in the United States
  - Island Falls (CDP), Maine, the main village in the town
- Island Falls, Saskatchewan, a power station in Canada
