= Bradford Farm Historic District =

Historic district in Maine, United States

- U.S. National Register of Historic Places
- U.S. Historic district
- Location within Maine Location within the United States
- Location: 46 Main St. (SR 11), Patten, Maine
- Coordinates: 45°59′55″N 68°26′53″W
- Area: 16.3 acres (6.6 ha)
- Built: 1842
- Architectural style: Greek Revival, Late Victorian
- NRHP reference No.: 03000294
- Added to NRHP: April 22, 2003

The Bradford Farm Historic District encompasses a historic farm property in Patten, Maine. Located on the west side of Maine State Route 11 on the north side of the village center, it includes a nearly-intact farm complex, with buildings dating from the 1840s to the 20th century. The property was listed on the National Register of Historic Places in 2003.

== Description and history ==
The town of Patten is located in the remote interior of Maine, in northern Penobscot County. The Bradford Farm complex occupies about 16 acres (6.5 ha) just north of the village center. The main complex is located on the west side of Maine State Route 11, the main north-south route through the county, and the associated farmlands extend west and north to Maine State Route 159, which provides access to the northern end of Baxter State Park. The main feature of the farm complex is its 19th-century connected farmstead, which includes a c. 1845 Greek Revival house, connected via ells to a barn complex, whose oldest element is an English barn of similar vintage. Other buildings include a 19th-century potato house and wagon shed.

The township that became Patten was first settled in the 1830s, and Patten was incorporated in 1841. The Bradford Farm property, originally a full lot of 160 acres (65 ha), was first owned by David Haynes, who is credited with building the earliest portions of the extant complex. The property was purchased in 1893 by Ezekiel Bradford, whose family worked the land for 105 years. The Bradfords operated the property primarily as a dairy farm, adding and extending buildings to meet a variety of needs. In 1998 the farmhouse was converted into a bed and breakfast inn. The property had several different owners from 1998 until 2022.

Two sisters from Georgia and their husbands purchased the property in December 2022. Their vision was to re-invigorate the property and bring it back to its prime as Irene Bradford had done decades before.

== See also ==
- National Register of Historic Places listings in Penobscot County, Maine
