= Nina E. Allender =

American cartoonist and activist (1873–1957)

Nina Evans Allender
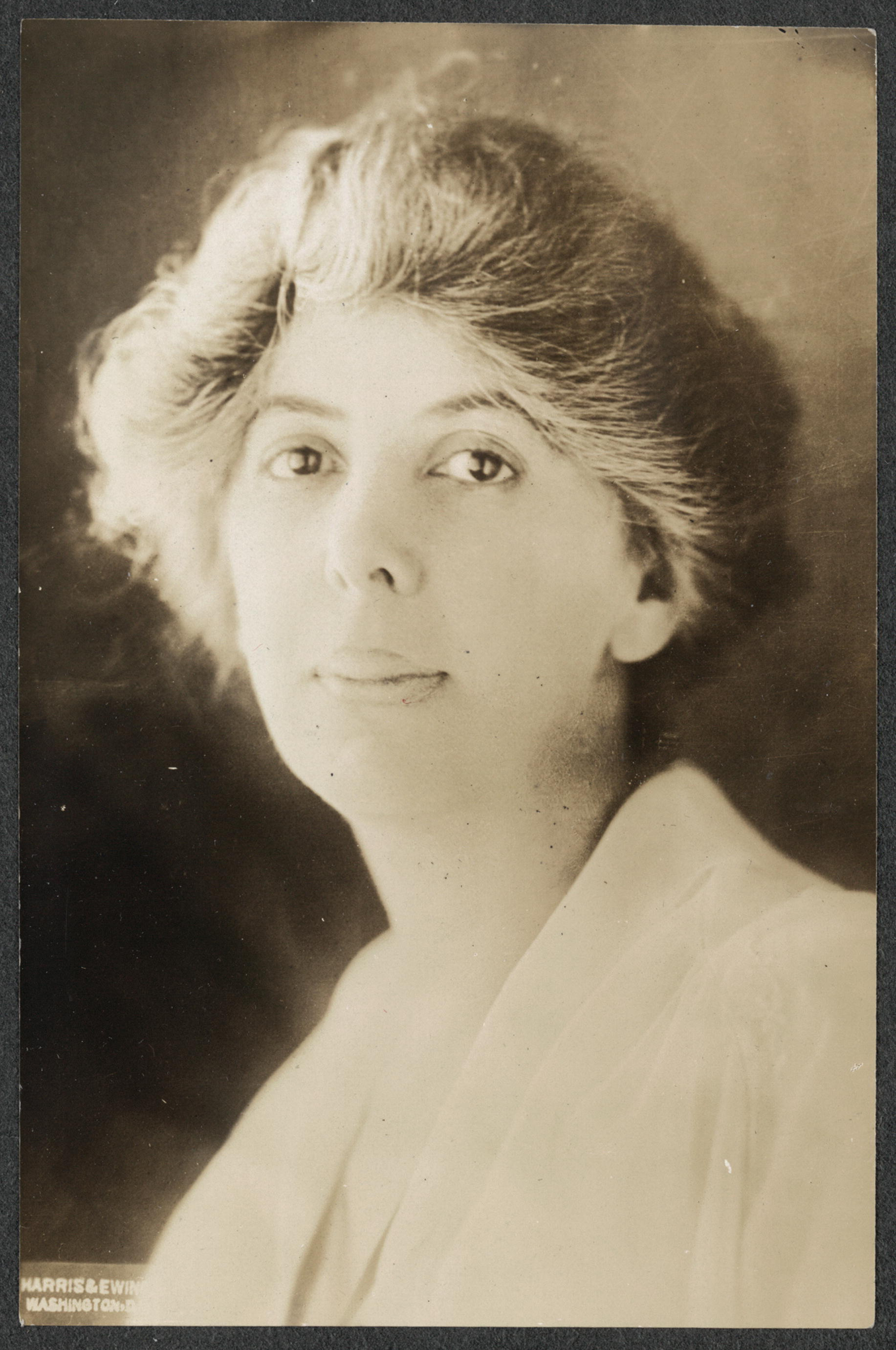
- Nina E. Allender, about 1915
- Born: Nina Evans; December 25, 1873; Auburn, Kansas, U.S.
- Died: April 2, 1957 (aged 83); Plainfield, New Jersey, U.S.
- Education: Corcoran Museum of Art; Pennsylvania Academy of the Fine Arts; Robert Henri's summer painting tour of Italy; Frank Brangwyn, London
- Known for: Political cartoonist
- Spouse: Charles H. Allender (1893–1905, divorce)

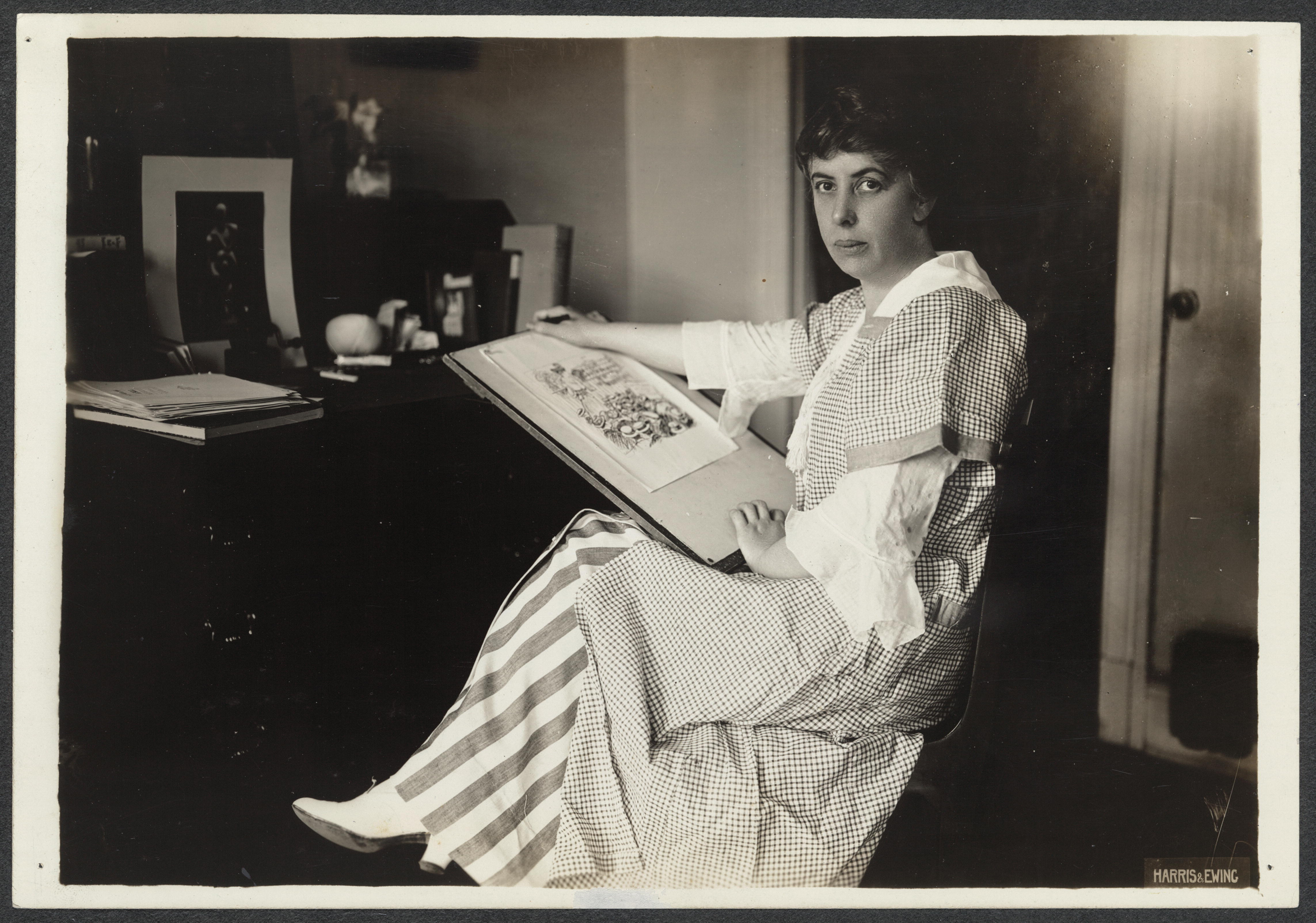
Nina E. Allender at desk

Nina Evans Allender (December 25, 1873 – April 2, 1957) was an American artist, cartoonist, and women's rights activist. She studied art in the United States and Europe with William Merritt Chase and Robert Henri. Allender worked as an organizer, speaker, and campaigner for women's suffrage and was the "official cartoonist" for the National Woman's Party's publications, creating what became known as the "Allender Girl."

== Personal life ==
=== Background ===
Nina Evans was born on Christmas Day, December 25, 1873, in Auburn, Kansas. (Note: Her year of birth is reported to be 1872 or 1873. A passport for Nina Evans Allender (artist, born in Auburn, Kansas and living in Washington, D.C.) states that she was born on December 25, 1873.) Her father, David Evans was from Oneida County, New York and moved to Kansas, where he served as a teacher before becoming superintendent of schools. Her mother, Eva Moore, was a teacher at a prairie school. The Evanses lived in Washington, D.C. by September 1881 when Eva Evans was working at the Department of the Interior as a clerk in the Land Office. She worked there until August 1902, and she was one of the first women to be employed by the federal government. David Evans worked at the United States Department of the Navy as a clerk and was a poet and short story writer. He died on December 13, 1906, and was buried at Arlington National Cemetery.

=== Marriage ===
In 1893, at the age of 19 Nina Evans married Charles H. Allender. Some years later Charles Allender reportedly took a sum of money from the bank where he worked and ran off with another woman. Abandoned by her husband, Nina sued Charles for divorce in January 1905, alleging infidelity. Their divorce was granted that year.

=== Middle and later years ===
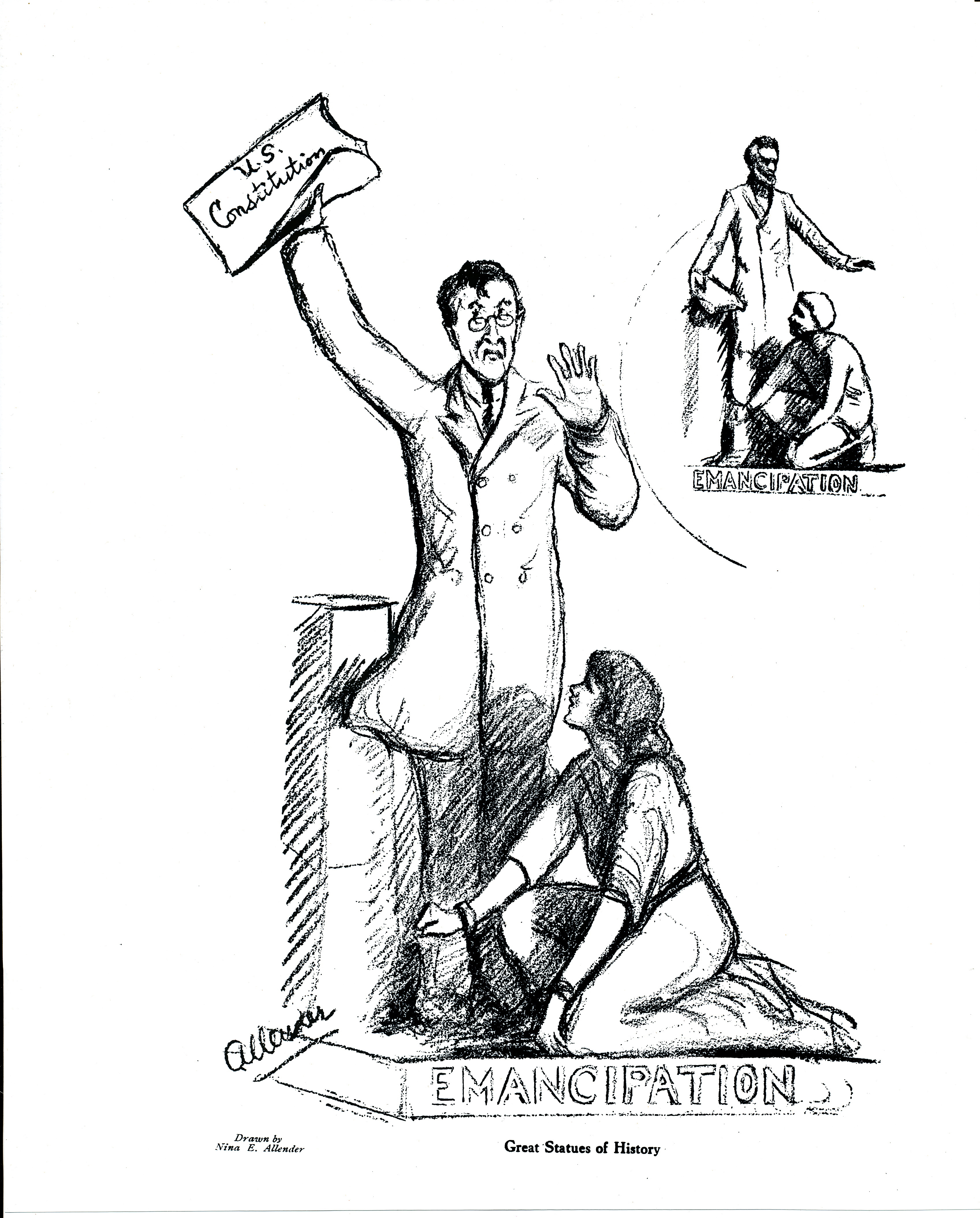
"Great Statues of History", 1915

About 1906 her portrait was painted with fellow artist Charles Sheeler by Morton Livingston Schamberg. It was formerly in the collection of the Corcoran Gallery of Art in Washington, D.C., and when that museum closed it was transferred to the National Gallery of Art. Following her years abroad studying art, Allender worked at the Treasury Department and the Government Land Office in Washington, D.C. She lived in Washington, D.C. in 1916 and maintained an art studio in New York City by 1917.

In 1942, Allender moved to Chicago, Illinois where she remained for over a decade. In 1955 she moved to Plainfield, New Jersey, where a niece, Mrs. Frank Detweiler (Joan) resided. She died at her niece's Plainfield house on April 2, 1957.

== Art and suffrage ==
=== Education and style ===
Allender enrolled in classes at the Corcoran Museum of Art and then studied under Robert Henri and William Merritt Chase at the Pennsylvania Academy of the Fine Arts from the spring of 1903 through 1907. She spent the summer of 1903 on a summer painting tour directed by Chase. Allender joined Robert Henri's summer painting tour of Italy in 1905. Allender considered William Merritt Chase and Robert Henri as her mentors. During one European study trip she became good friends with modernist painters Charles Sheeler and Morton Schamberg. In London, she was a student of Frank Brangwyn. Allender's works in a Washington Society of Artists exhibit in 1909 were described as "some excellent little snow pictures".

=== Women's suffrage ===
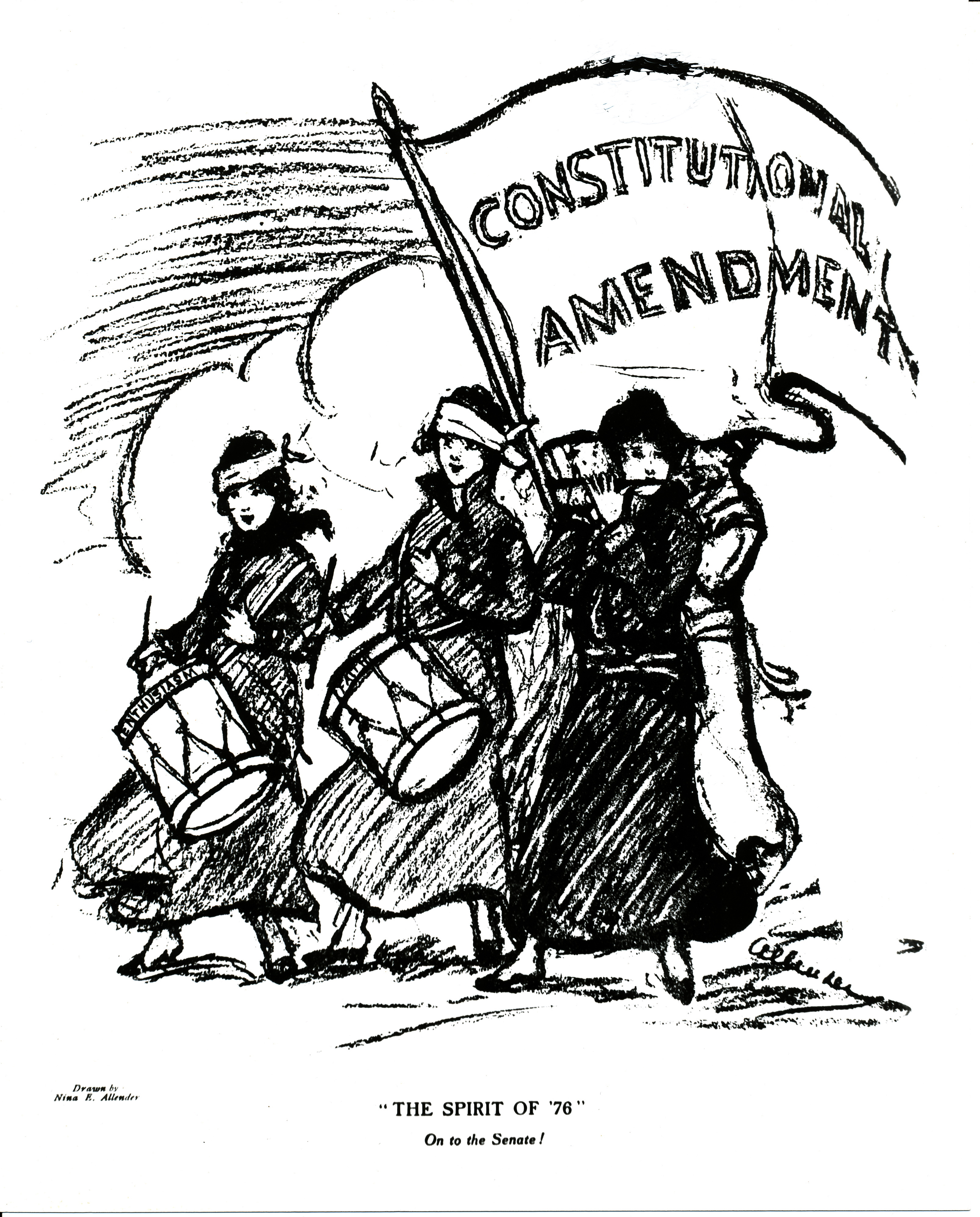
"The Spirit of '76.' On to the Senate!", 1915

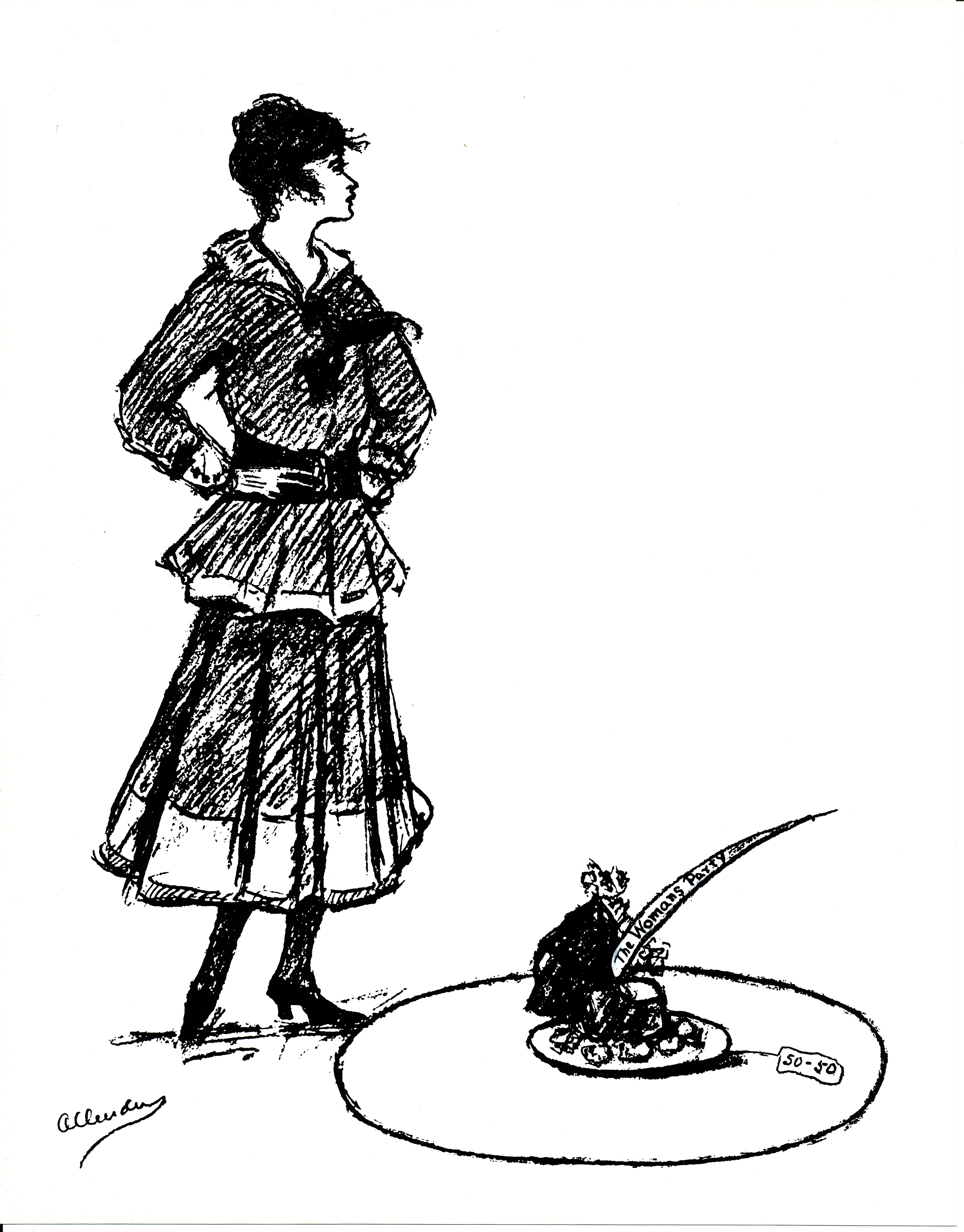
"Our Hat in the Ring", 1916

At the age of 38, Nina Allender became actively involved in the National American Woman Suffrage Association (NAWSA). In 1912, Ohio held a referendum on woman suffrage, and Allender traveled there and enjoyed canvassing door to door and demonstrating with other suffragists. Allender had volunteered to assist NAWSA's Congressional Committee in planning their March 3, 1912 suffrage pageant in Washington. Allender was appointed chair of the committee on "outdoor meetings" as well as on "posters, post cards and colors." Within the year she became president of the District of Columbia Woman Suffrage Association and was a featured speaker at numerous local gatherings. In spring 1913, she was president of the Stanton Suffrage Club, which held "Suffrage as Relating to Business Women". Allender shared the speaker's platform with future congresswoman Jeannette Rankin, one of about 14 women representing multiple states to meet with President Woodrow Wilson in a suffrage deputation.

In 1913, Eva and Nina were recruited into the Congressional Union of NAWSA, later the National Woman's Party by Alice Paul when she was in Washington D.C. to lead the Congressional Committee of NAWSA. Inez Haynes Irwin stated that both Eva and Nina had readily agreed to make monthly financial donations and volunteer their time for the organization.

In April 1914, Allender relocated temporarily to Wilmington, Delaware to head the Delaware Congressional Union for Equal Suffrage and to coordinate a parade on May 2. A year later she was on the advisory council of the national Congressional Union for Woman's Suffrage and became chairman of the newly organized local branch of the Congressional Union. In a press release on suffrage, Allender was identified as one of six "crack street orators" of the suffrage campaign. On December 9, 1915, she was slated to preside over a meeting of the state chairs and officers.

In 1916, Allender was an official delegate at the Chicago convention of the newly launched National Woman's Party. That fall, she was sent by the National Woman's Party to lobby in Wyoming for the federal amendment. When the National Woman's Party began picketing the White House to pressure President Wilson, Allender joined the picket line and served as a delegate to a large suffrage parade. The National Woman's Party sent valentines, designed by Allender, on February 14, 1917, to President Wilson and legislators as a softer appeal in the campaign to attain women's right to vote.

=== National Woman's Party cartoonist ===
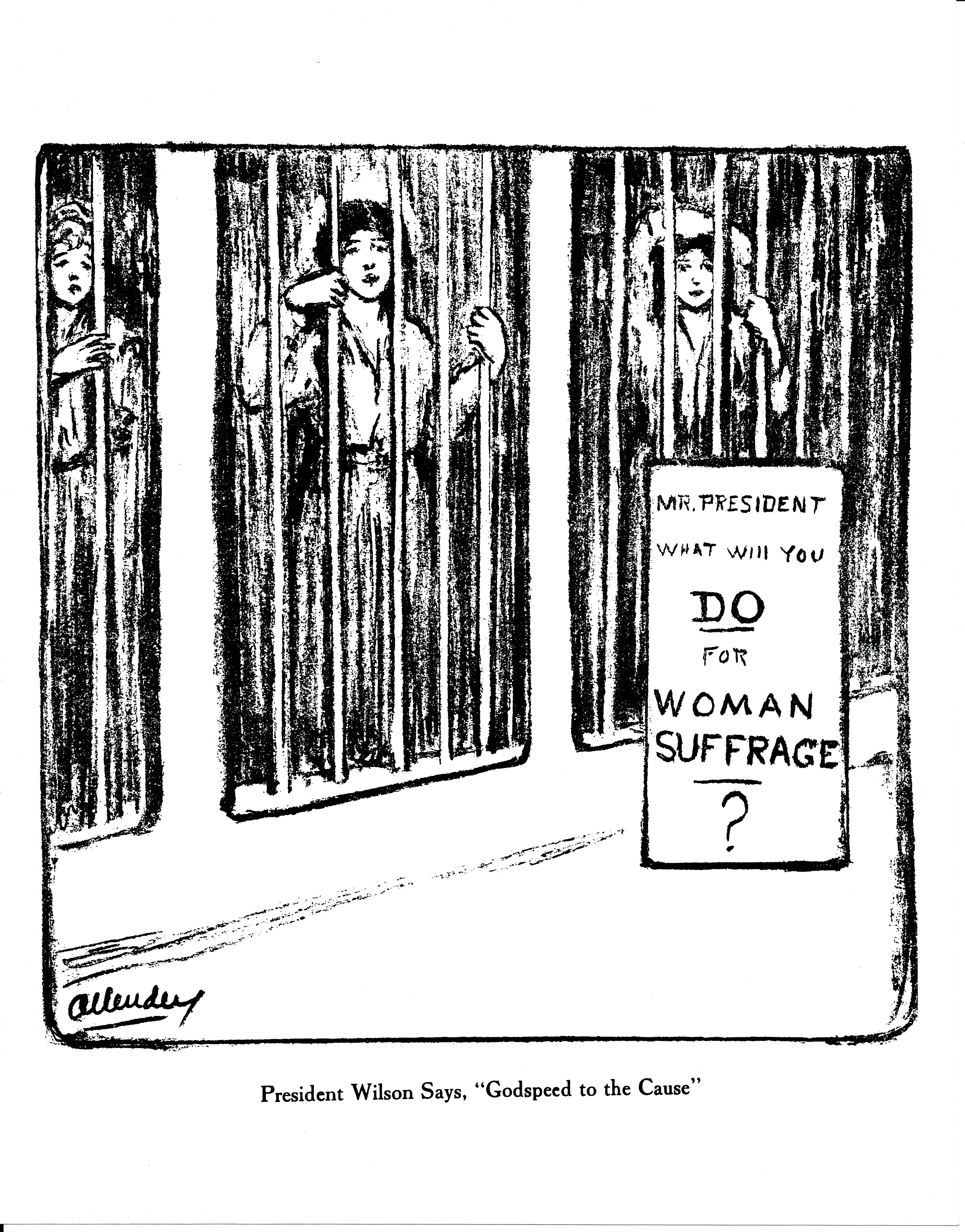
"President Wilson Says, "Godspeed to the Cause", 1917

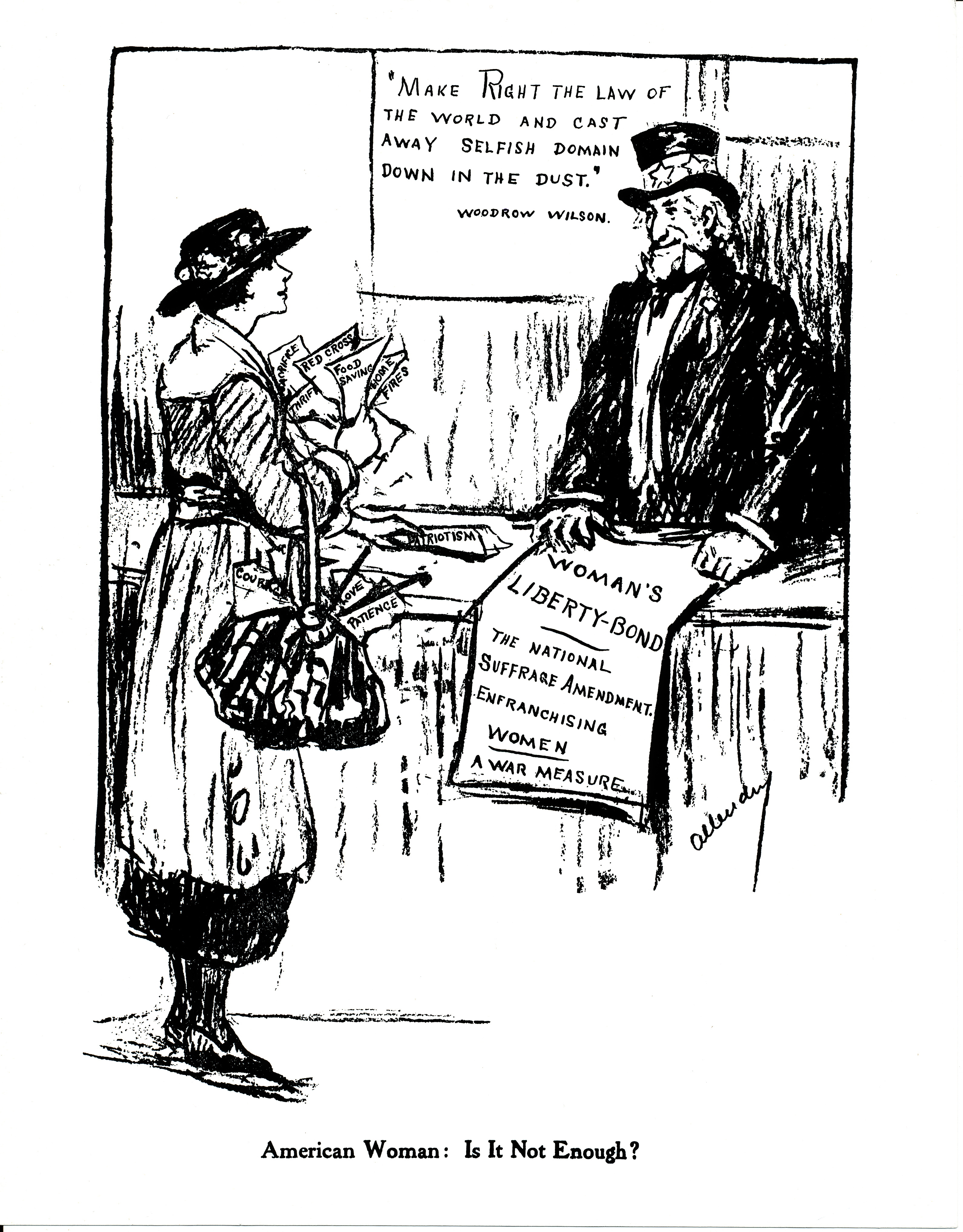
"American Woman: Is it not Enough?", 1918

Integral to the women's rights and suffrage campaigns were its newspapers. (Note: The Woman's Journal was founded in 1870 for the American Woman Suffrage Association. When in 1890 the organization merged with the Anthony-Stanton National Woman Suffrage Association, the Woman's Journal became the news and propaganda outlet for the National American Woman Suffrage Association.) The Congressional Union under Alice Paul founded its own periodical, The Suffragist, in 1913. Allender was the key artist for the publication which featured political cartoons. The writers were Alice Paul and Rheta Childe Dorr, the founding editor, who came to Washington at the urging of Paul and Lucy Burns, another suffrage leader. Allender, having been coaxed by Paul, found she had a talent for drawing cartoons and became The Suffragist's "official cartoonist". Her first political cartoon, which portrayed the campaign and women's need for the ballot, was published in the June 6, 1914 issue on heavy 10" x 13" paper. The entire front page was subsequently occupied by a cartoon by Nina Allender. A 1918 review of her work conceded that her early period "dealt with old suffrage texts, still trying to prove that woman's place was no longer in the home."

Early 20th-century American cartoons had enjoyed the Gibson Girl from Charles Dana Gibson and the Brinkley Girl from Nell Brinkley. Allender was credited with producing 287 political cartoons regarding suffrage. Her depiction of the "Allender girl," captured the image of a young, capable American woman, embodying "the new spirit that came into the suffrage movement when Alice Paul and Lucy Burns came to the National Capital in 1913."

She gave to the American public in cartoons that have been widely copied and commented on, a new type of suffragist—the young and zealous women of a new generation determined to wait no longer for a just right. It was Mrs. Allender's cartoons more than any other one thing that in the newspapers of this country began to change the cartoonist's idea of the suffragist.

— "The Suffragist' as a Publicity Medium". The Suffragist

Public image of a women's rights advocates changed through Allender's representation of the stylish, attractive, and dedicated young woman, like the educated, modern, and freer New Woman. Other subjects in her cartoons were Congressmen, Uncle Sam, and symbols for the woman suffrage amendment were used in the publication to promote the efforts of the National Women's Party and communicate women's rights movement events.

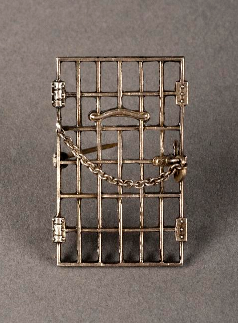
Amelia Himes Walker's "Jailed for Freedom" Pin, 1917

Allender designed the "Jailed for Freedom" pin, which was bestowed on women who were jailed beginning July 1917 for their campaigning and picketing activities. It was named Amelia Himes Walker's "Jailed for Freedom" pin in acknowledge the two-month period when the woman's rights activist was imprisoned in the Occoquan Workhouse and the incarceration and abuse that had been suffered by other suffragettes.

The cover of September 1, 1920 issue of The Suffragist had Allender's Victory to symbolize the attainment of the right to vote. The publication was produced weekly until 1921, was then succeeded in 1923 by Equal Rights, for which Allender also created political cartoons. She continued to work for equal rights after women won the right to vote, including sitting on the NWP's council. She retired due to poor health in 1946.

=== Art organizations ===
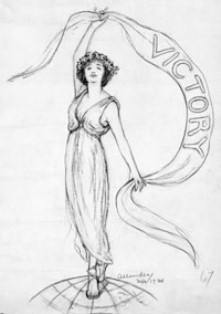
"Victory", The Suffragist, September 1, 1920

Nina Allender was a member of the following art organizations.

- Arts Club of Washington, D.C., a founding member
- Art Students League of Washington and was its corresponding secretary early in the century.
- Beaux Arts Club
- Society of Washington Artists
- Washington Watercolor Club

=== Exhibits ===
Works by Nina Allender have been exhibited at the following:

- Arts Club of Washington
- Cosmos Club of Washington
- National Academy of Design
- Pennsylvania Academy of the Fine Arts
- The Society of Washington Artists
- Library of Congress.
- Sewall–Belmont House and Museum

=== Legacy ===
Following the culmination of the suffrage crusade, Nina Allender remained active in the National Woman's Party in its work for gender equality, and remained on its council for another two decades. Her original drawings were initially housed in the Library of Congress, until reclaimed by the Sewall–Belmont House and Museum (now the Belmont–Paul Women's Equality National Monument), which was the headquarters for the National Woman's Party. Some were reprinted in collections.

To commemorate the 75th anniversary of the Nineteenth Amendment in 1995, the National Museum of Women in the Arts hosted an exhibition, "Artful Advocacy: Cartoons of the Woman Suffrage Movement." Featured artists were Allender, Lou Rogers, and Blanche Ames.

== See also ==
- List of suffragists and suffragettes
- Timeline of women's suffrage
- Women's suffrage organizations
