= Enock Glidden =

American Athlete

Enock Glidden is an American disabled athlete and professional adventurer. A Maine-based accessibility activist, he advocates for others with disabilities.

== Education ==
Glidden received a degree from the University of Maine at Augusta, where he was the university's 2023 commencement speaker.

== Career ==
Glidden was born with spina bifida, a neural tube defect that damages the spinal cord and nerves. He received his first wheelchair at the age of four. Glidden was introduced to sports at the age of 13 at Katahdin Junior High School in Stacyville, Maine. He has participated in sports like wheelchair racing, skiing, and competitive shooting.

In October 2015, Glidden climbed Yosemite National Park's Washington Column by using a metal bar attached to a mechanical ascender. The following October, he scaled Yosemite's El Capitan after doing more than 800 pull-ups a day to train for the climb. Glidden was carried in a rescue basket and the descent took 12 hours. It was featured in the short documentary Enock.

Glidden rock climbs and ice climbs with Paradox Sports, which offers adaptive climbing across the United States. He also works with Maine Trail Finder to assess the accessibility of trails around the state. Glidden's blog, "Go Beyond the Fence", recounts his adventures and encourages people of all abilities to experience the outdoors.

== Personal life ==
Glidden grew up in the town of Patten, Maine. He lives in Bethel, Maine.
