= Lou Rogers =

American cartoonist

Annie Lucasta Rogers
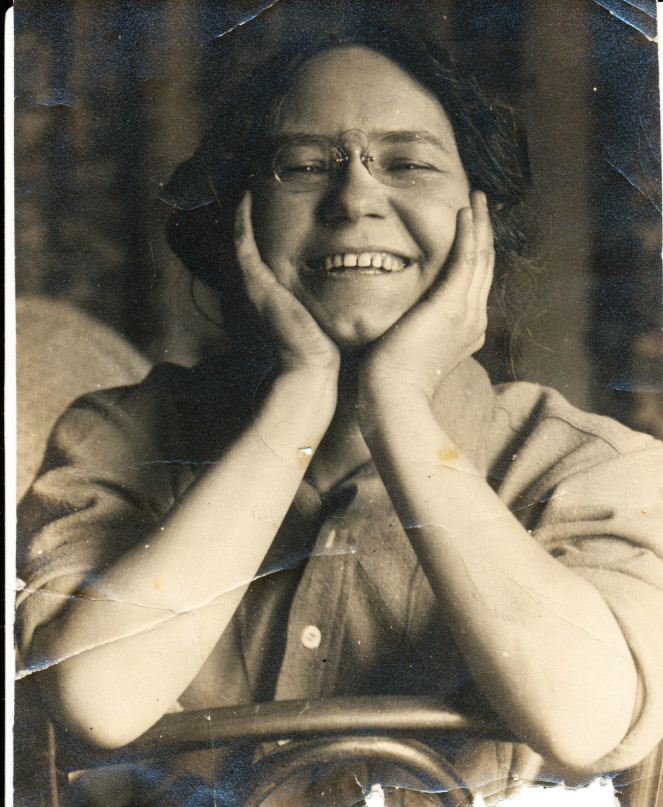
- Rogers about 1910
- Born: Annie Lucasta Rogers; November 26, 1879; Patten, Maine, US
- Died: March 11, 1952 (aged 72); Canton, New York US
- Education: Massachusetts Normal Art School, Art Students League
- Occupations: cartoonist, illustrator, writer, radio host, children's author
- Years active: 1908–1940
- Known for: Woman Suffrage cartoons, suffrage speeches, membership in Heterodoxy, Animal News Club
- Notable work: The Gimmicks, Rise of the Red Alders, Ska-Denge
- Spouse: Howard Smith

Lou Rogers (November 26, 1879 – March 11, 1952) was a cartoonist, illustrator, writer, storyteller, public speaker, radio host, and political activist.

== Family and youth ==
Born Annie Lucasta Rogers in 1879 in the lumbering town of Patten, Maine, Rogers was the fourth of seven children born to Col. Luther Bailey "L. B." Rogers and Mary Elizabeth Barker Rogers. Her childhood was spent on a small farm, with vacations at the family's isolated camp at nearby Shin Pond, where pristine woodlands abutted the quiet lake. From an early age she loved to draw, producing sketches and caricatures, including ones of her teachers. The Rogers children were educated at the Patten Academy that grandfather Dr. Luther Rogers helped found. After working at a district school, Rogers was hired as an assistant to teach at the Patten Academy. Education was a family value, and her siblings studied at the University of Maine and McGill University. Brother Lore Rogers became a well-known government bacteriologist and was awarded two honorary doctorates.

== Becoming a cartoonist ==
Lou Rogers, “He Does the Family Voting.” New York Call, October 25, 1911.

Around 1900 Rogers decided on a career in art and enrolled at the Massachusetts Normal Art School, now the Massachusetts College of Art and Design. By her own account, her spirited personality and predilection to explore the city of Boston proved incompatible with these studies. After one year she dropped out. She then enrolled in physical culture classes offered in Washington DC. Afterwards she signed on to a business venture with a classmate, where they traveled out West offering physical culture seminars to communities. Because they lacked business experience, it was a financial disaster. She soon had a new determination: she would become a cartoonist. Off she went to New York City, where she contacted newspaper offices. Finding barriers to being a woman cartoonist using the name Annie, she began submitting her work as "Lou Rogers" In 1908 her earliest known published cartoons appeared in Judge Magazine, one of the popular nationwide humor magazines. Rogers's art was shocking to many, such as her work entitled "He Does the Family Voting" which depicts a man with asses ears clutching his diploma and hogging the ballot box, claiming 'The Ballot Box is Mine Because It’s Mine!'. This work was denied by the Woman’s Journal, the publication for the National American Woman Suffrage Association (NAWSA), and by a Hearst editor who declined based upon Rogers's sex. Rogers thus began sending in her work by mail, signing as 'Lou' Rogers. The androgynous nature of her signature as ‘Lou’ might have helped her bypass gender discrimination in this line of work and grant her more and earlier publications. "He Does the Family Voting" was later accepted by the Socialist publication The New York Call and published on October 25th, 1911. Ms Rogers became a staff artist at Judge, regularly contributing original artwork to the suffrage page called "The Modern Woman" alongside H. G. Peter, the illustrator who created the image of Wonder Woman. Peter drew heavy influence from Rogers's art for both the physical look and themes/motifs within the first Wonder Woman comics, most notably images of breaking free of constraints. Rogers's "Tearing Off the Bonds" shares a striking resemblance to early images of Peter's. In a small way, the image of Wonder Woman continues the legacy of Rogers. By 1912 the Patten Academy Mirror announced that Annie Rogers was a cartoonist in New York City. A year later Cartoons Magazine profiled Rogers as a successful cartoonist in "A Woman Destined to Do Big Things." "Master cartoonist, teacher and critic" Grant Hamilton summarized her talents:

She has what ninety-nine out of a hundred lack, the ability to see the way to get the idea into the picture. And she has forty ideas about everything. So far she is the only woman artist in the world who is seeking her complete artistic destiny in the cartoon. . . She means to win. And she will keep on meaning until she does.

The Woman's Journal, a pro-suffrage newspaper, highlighted Rogers's contribution at about the same time, describing her as the "only woman artist to devote all her time to feminism". Her plan to distribute her suffrage cartoons to newspapers and for campaign literature was announced in 1914. In 1917, Margaret Sanger founded the Birth Control Review and hired Rogers as the Art Director. As late as 1924 a news story touted her as the "World's Only Woman Cartoonist," which Rogers herself corrected. Though the first active suffrage cartoonist, other notable female suffrage cartoonists include Nina Allender and Blanche Ames. New York City alone claimed, among others, resident cartoonist-illustrator Laura Foster and Edwina Dumm, as well as Cornelia Barns and Alice Beach Winter, who contributed to the radical avant-garde magazine, The Masses:

== Gallery ==
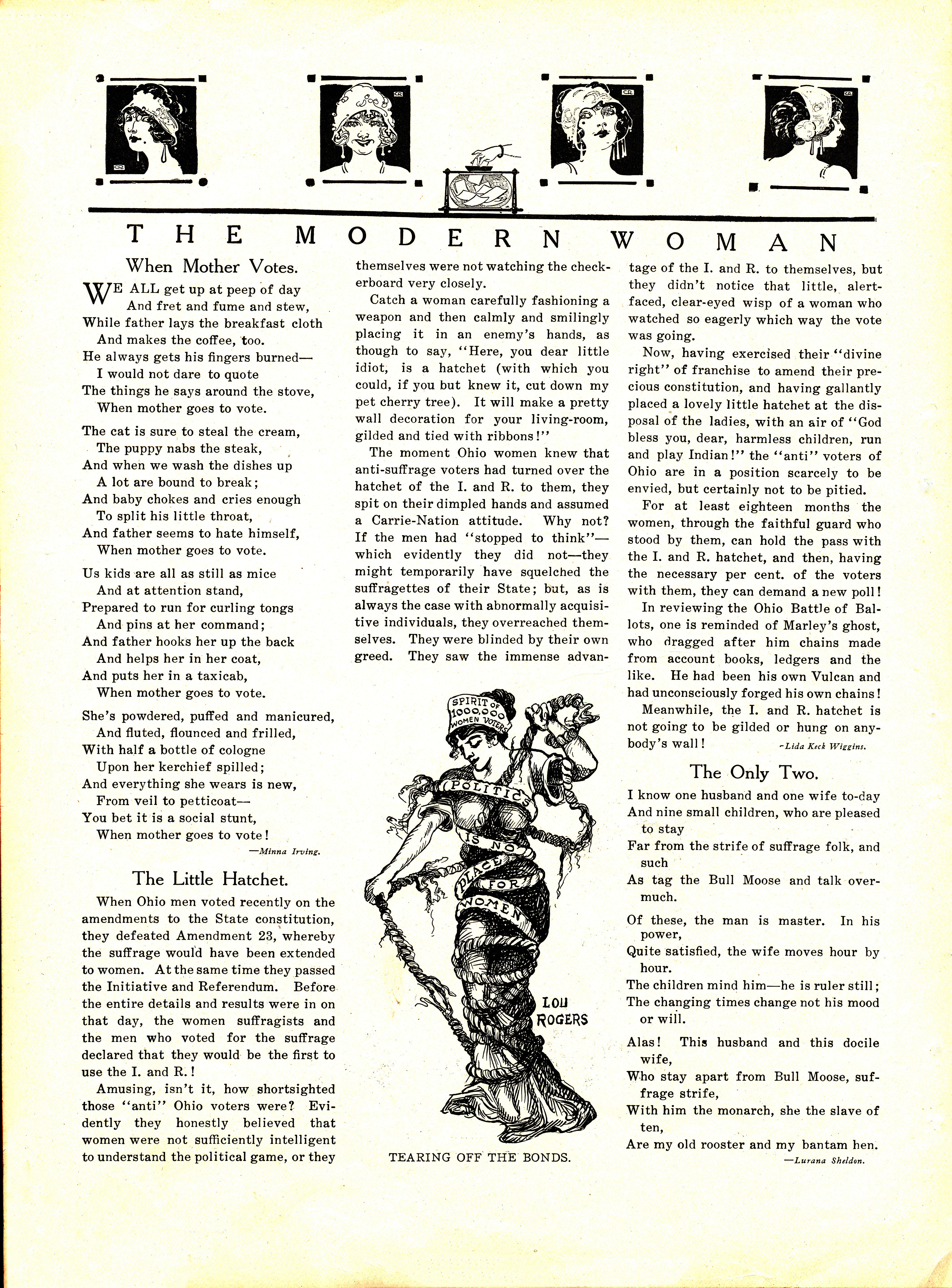
Cartoon by Lou Rogers, "Tearing Off the Bonds." The Modern Woman, Judge, 19 October 1912.

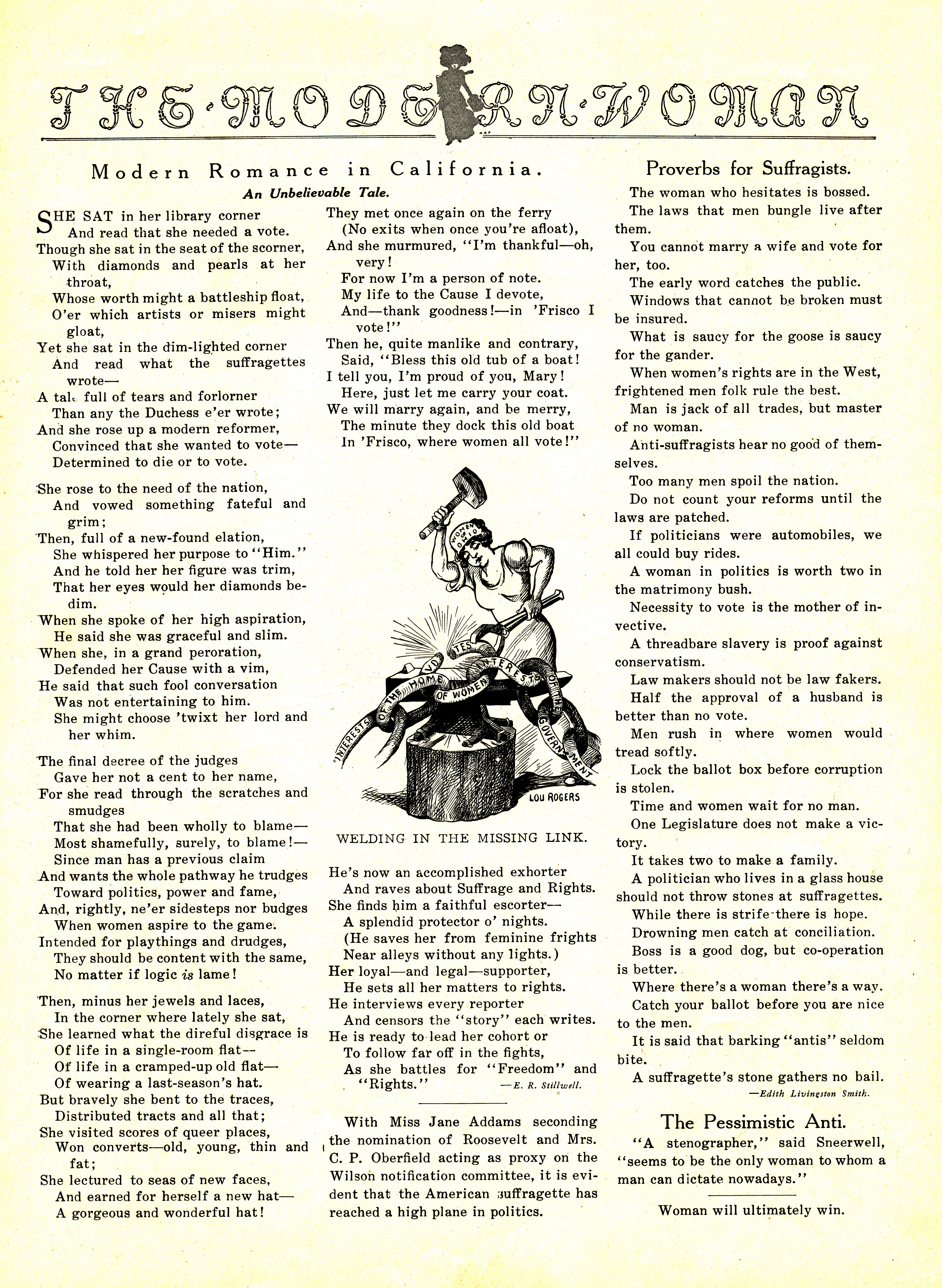
Cartoon by Lou Rogers, "Welding in the Missing Link." The Modern Woman, Judge, 24 August 1912.

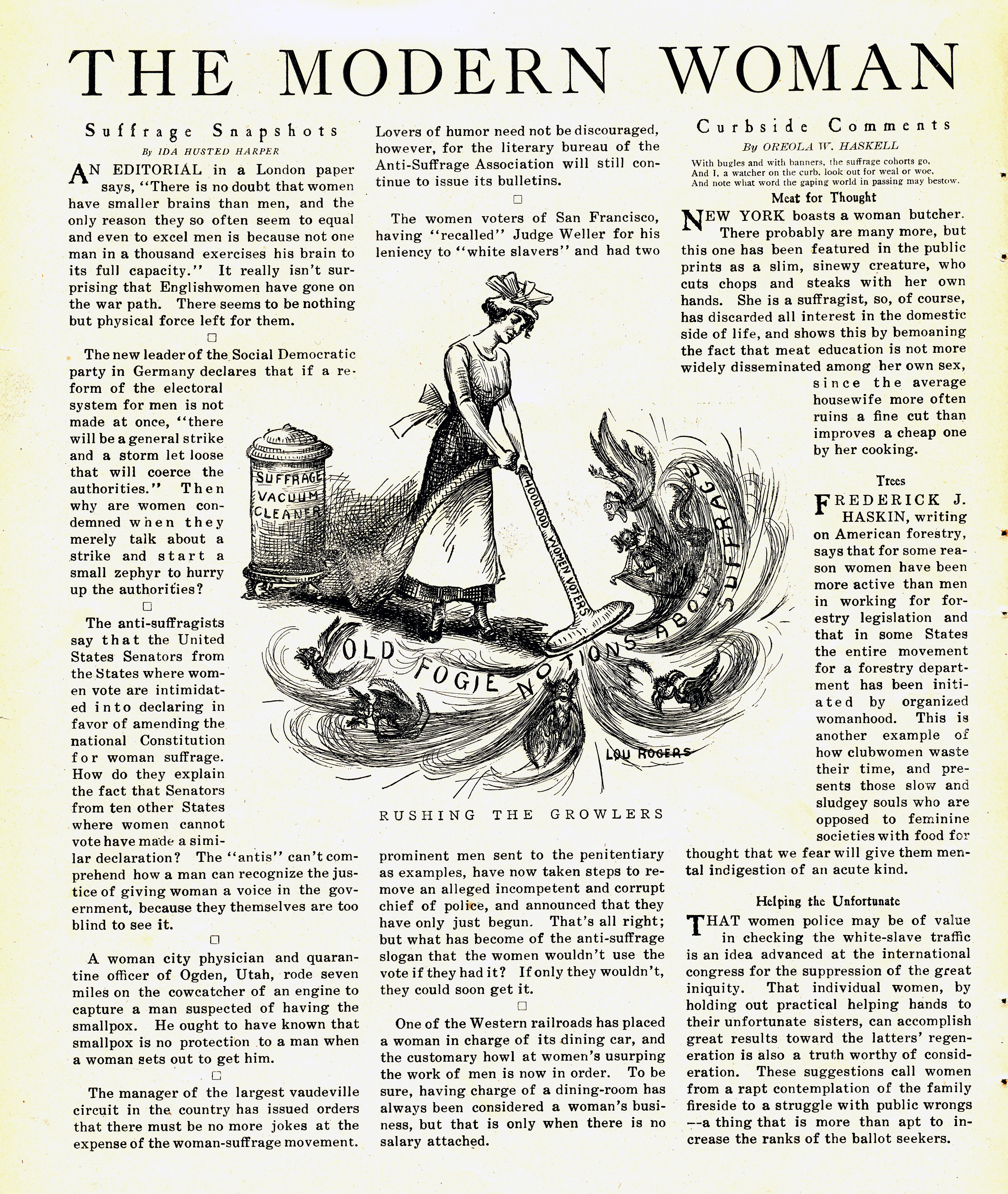
Cartoon by Lou Rogers, " Rushing the Growlers." The Modern Woman, Judge, 23 October 1913.

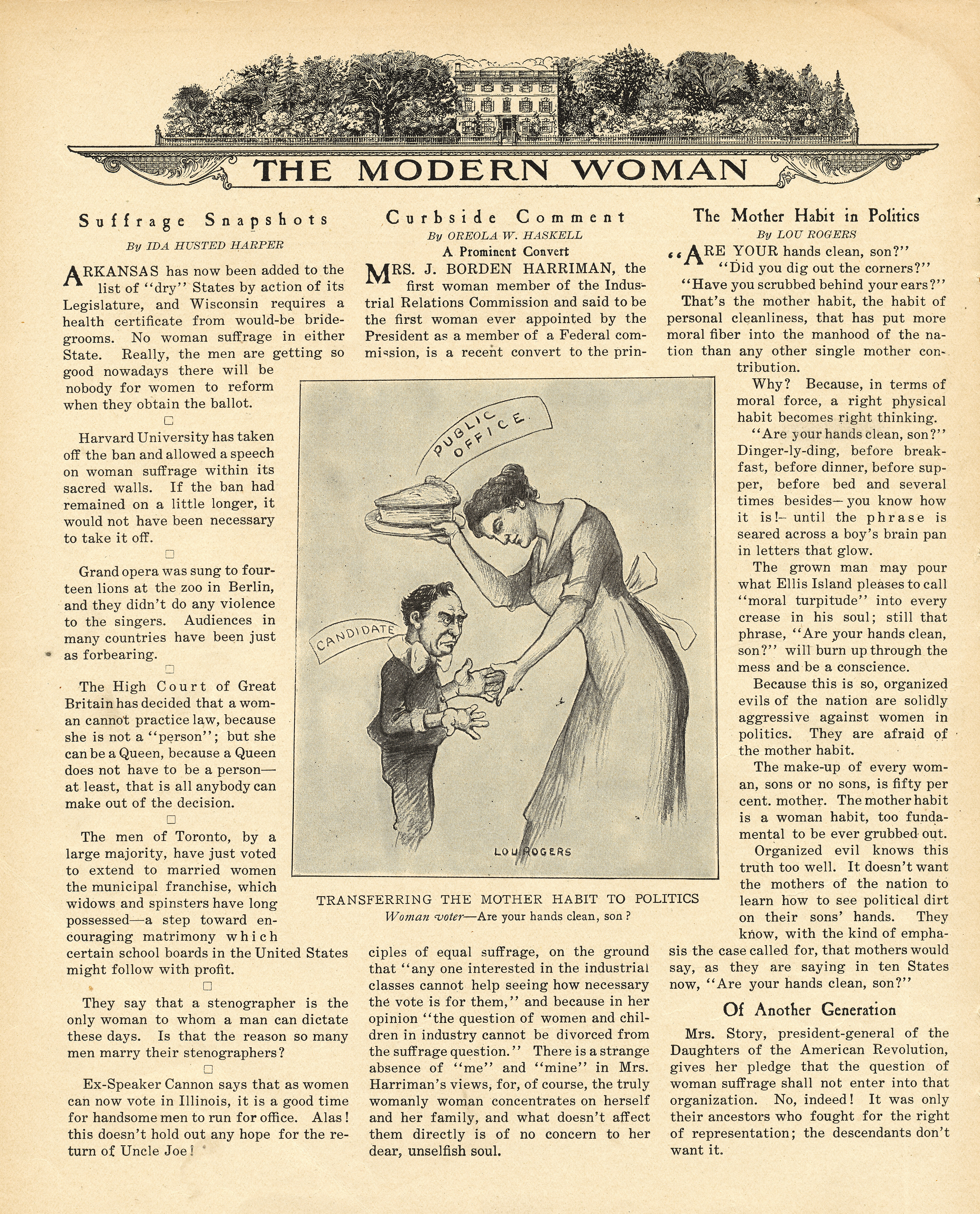
Cartoon by Lou Rogers, "Transferring the Mother Habit to Politics." The Modern Woman, Judge, 31 January 1914.

== Suffragist, feminist, socialist in Greenwich Village ==
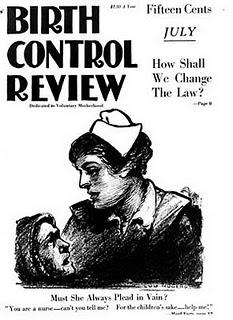
"Must She Always Plead in Vain?" Cartoon by Lou Rogers, July 1919 for Birth Control Review.

In the atmosphere of Greenwich Village, Rogers was attracted to the woman suffrage movement and to socialism, perceiving both movements as worthy causes to be promoted through her cartoons. Today her reputation is largely as a cartoonist for woman suffrage. She was passionate in her beliefs and prolific in her output, as her work began appearing in the New York Call, Judge, and the Woman's Journal, a propaganda newspaper for the National American Woman Suffrage Association. She was invited to join Heterodoxy, a private club for radical, freethinking professional women, that met twice a month, for lunch and serious discussions. She formed a close friendship with Heterodoxy member Elizabeth C. Watson, a Maryland woman active in prison and labor reform. Both women were passengers on Henry Ford's "Peace Ship," which carried 102 peace delegates and 46 journalists to Europe in December 1915. Rogers began appearing in Times Square, street corners, fairs, and other densely occupied locations dressed in her artist's smock, unloading a large wooden platform built by her brother. She conducted a series of Cartoon Speeches, addressing the gathering crowds as she drew oversized cartoons in the tradition of chalk talks. She was considered a soapbox orator for her suffrage talks, and her activities were documented in newspapers across the region, even capturing the attention of the police officers sent to stop her.

Rogers's endorsement of socialism paralleled her support of women and reflected a philosophy of human liberation.

If the cartoon has never appealed to women workers, isn't it because it has never covered a class of interests with direct bearing on them? Then it seems to me of great moment that national and municipal issues should be handled from the woman's standpoint as well as the man's.

She published cartoons in the socialist paper, The New York Call as early as 1911, and by 1919 was a regular contributor to the Call with a featured cartoon series on Woman's Sphere. When American women finally achieved the vote, Rogers continued her activism by contributing cartoons to the New Yorker Volkzeitung and the Birth Control Review.

== Author, illustrator, radio host ==
The 1920s was a decade of productivity for Rogers. She contracted with the Ladies Home Journal to produce a series of children's stories in rhyme about imaginary little people called "Gimmicks". The stories were accompanied by a full-page of illustrations to be cut out and mounted on cardboard allowing the child to interact with the storyline. Rogers wrote the verses and provided illustrations, providing color originals 30" in height. Color for the illustrations was provided by Howard Smith, a New York City artist who, on October 15, 1924, became her husband. In 1927 she was invited to write a short anonymous autobiography for The Nation Magazine. The magazine was presenting a series called "These Modern Women," and Rogers had been selected by managing editor Freda Kirchwey as a successful woman typifying new feminist possibilities.

The success of the Gimmicks persuaded Rogers to try her hand at children's books. The Rise of the Red Alders was published by Harper and Brothers in 1928. The following year she completed Ska-Denge (Beaver for Revenge). In the early 1930s she became a radio personality. Her program was called "Animal News Club," and aired over NBC radio. The program offered a poster and a membership pin. Her work was also included in a collection of women's humor, Laughing Their Way: Women's Humor in America.

== Later years ==
In 1925 Rogers purchased an old farm in New Milford, CT. It was nestled in a scenic hillside and provided a quiet getaway, studio space and an opportunity for renovation. Her nieces and nephews relished their visits there, spending time with their fun-loving aunt in the countryside.

By the early 1950s, Rogers was diagnosed with amyotrophic lateral sclerosis. Her condition degenerated rapidly, and she died at the age of 72.

== Postscript ==
In 1913, Cartoons Magazine had written of Rogers: "Her pen is destined to win battles for the Woman's Movement and her name will be recorded when the history of the early days of the fight for equal rights is written."

To commemorate the 75th anniversary of the Nineteenth Amendment in 1995, the National Museum of Women in the Arts hosted an exhibition, "Artful Advocacy: Cartoons of the Woman Suffrage Movement". Featured artists were Rogers, Nina Allender, and Blanche Ames. Eight decades later, the prophecy had been realized.
