= Island Falls Opera House =

- U.S. National Register of Historic Places
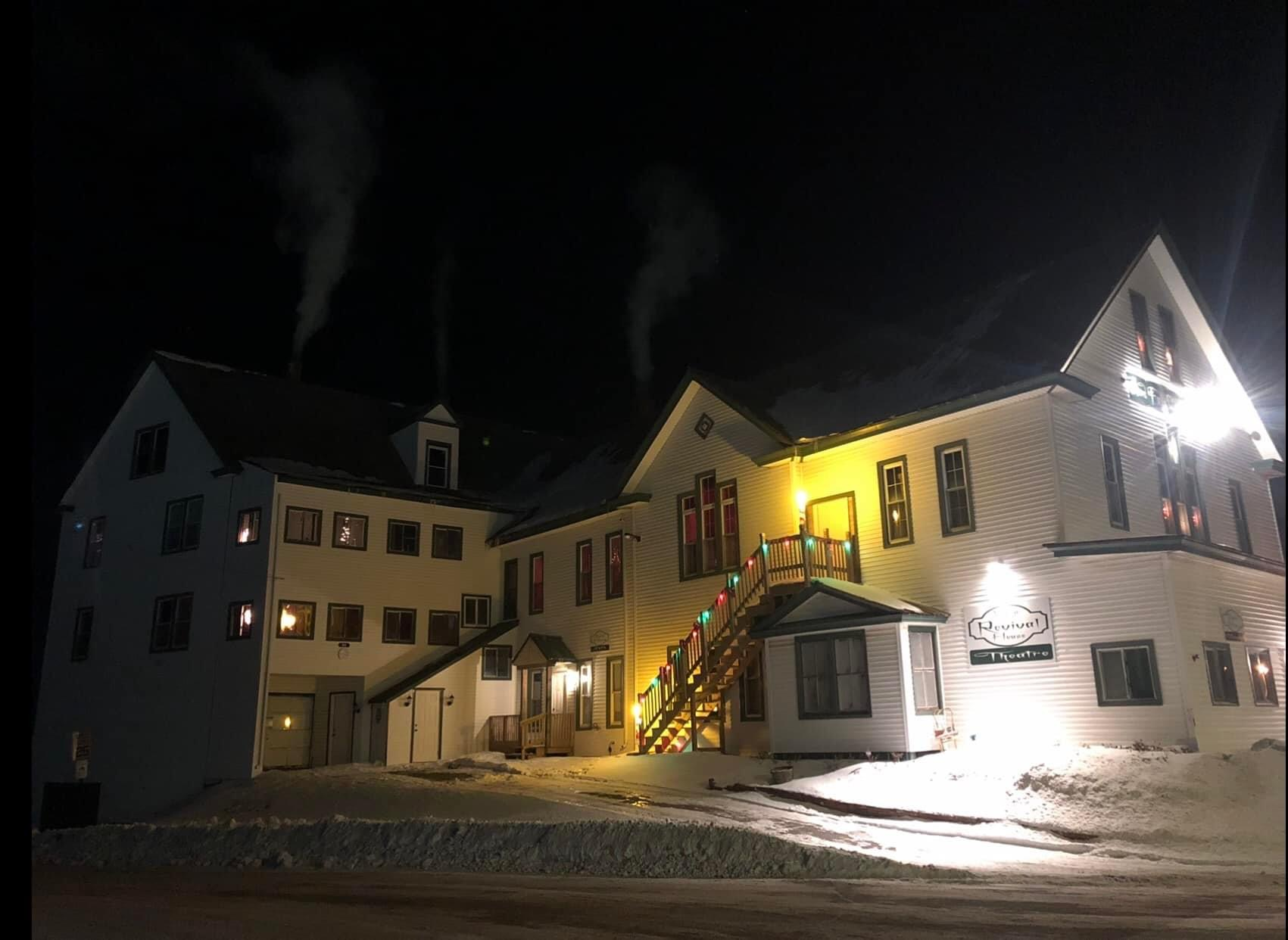

- Location within Maine Location within the United States
- Location: Patten Rd. and Sewall St., Island Falls, Maine
- Coordinates: 46°0′31″N 68°16′13″W
- Area: 0.5 acres (0.20 ha)
- Built: 1894
- Architect: Peters, Levett; Baldwin, Henry
- NRHP reference No.: 84001359
- Added to NRHP: July 19, 1984

The Island Falls Opera House is a historic multipurpose building at the junction of Old Patten Road, Burleigh Street and Sewall Street in the center of the small town of Island Falls, Maine. Built in 1894, the building included retail, performance, and residential spaces, and is a type of building that was once common and is now rare in rural Maine. It was listed on the National Register of Historic Places in 1984. Until recently the building sat vacant and unused. Since the sale of the building in December 2020, the Opera House has seen much cleanup and repair activity.

The new owners, The Hartins, who lived in Crystal, Maine, just a few miles from the building, plan to revitalize the property and open the theater and storefront back up to the community. The building will also house two Inn Room rental units similar to a hotel accommodation for folks visiting and traveling through to stay per night, weekend and even monthly stay basis. There will be no long term occupancy rentals in the building.

The Hartins now reside in the house wing full time, since renovations have been completed to the living quarters in that area of the building.

== Description and history ==
The Island Falls Opera House is a large, roughly L-shaped wood frame building, which occupies a prominent lot overlooking a major intersection in the center of Island Falls. One leg of the L runs north-south, and is 2-1/2 stories in height, with a front-gable roof. The front facade has a projecting single-story section with a flat roof, behind which the second floor facade has a central Palladian-style three-part window at the center, and narrow windows flanking and in the gable above. On the side walls of this section there are three bays, most with narrow sash windows, then a repeat of the Palladian-style windows, which are topped by cross-gables at the roof line, and then additional bays with narrow sash windows. The rear section of the building has a gable roof running east-west and is 3-1/2 stories in height.

The interior of the southern leg originally had a general store and the theater entrance on the ground floor. The store section still retains original wooden counters and shelving, while the theater lobby has the original ticket booth. The theater occupies most of the upper levels of the building, and includes original seating and wall decorations. The lower sections of the rear portion have a living area that has retained original woodwork, including a stairway with an elaborate newell post, and a decorative arch leading into the parlor.

The hall was built in 1894 by Columbus Lamb Pettengill and his son on land purchased from W. W. Sewall, a major local landowner, whose deeds of sale disallowed the sale of alcohol. The performance venue was a major local entertainment space, and was adapted for the showing of motion pictures in the 1920s. The property now stands vacant.

== See also ==
- National Register of Historic Places listings in Aroostook County, Maine
