= Lore Alford Rogers =

American bacteriologist (1875–1975)

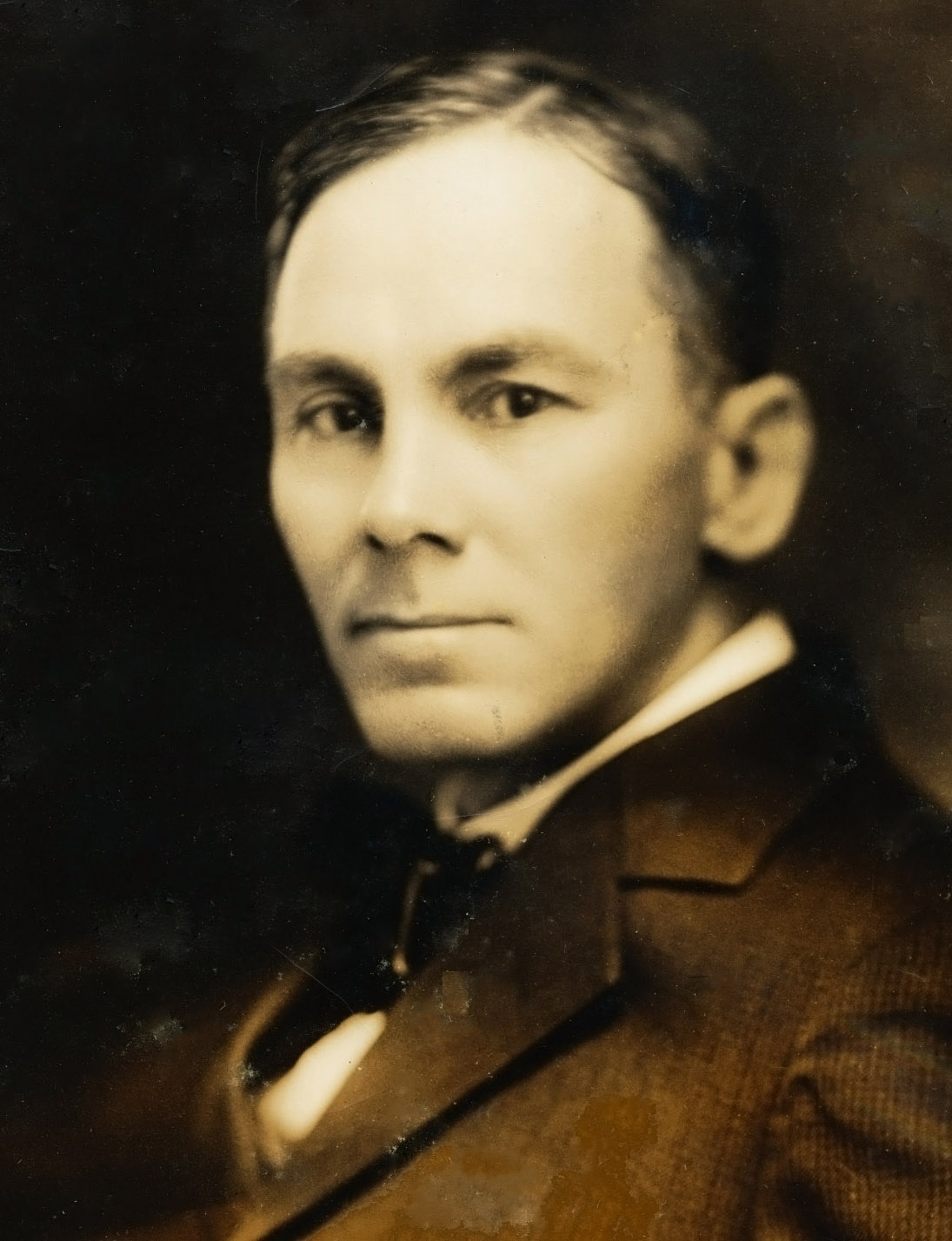
- Born: February 7, 1875; Patten, Maine, US
- Died: March 21, 1975 (aged 100); Patten, Maine, US
- Monuments: Rogers Hall, University of Maine
- Education: University of Maine, University of Wisconsin
- Occupations: bacteriologist, dairy scientist
- Years active: 1899-1942
- Organization(s): Bureau of Dairy Industry, United States Department of Agriculture
- Known for: Chief of the Research Laboratories of the Bureau of Dairy Industry, contributions to dairy science and microbiology, promoting the American Type Culture Collection
- Spouse(s): Beatrice C. Oberly (married 1906-1953), Katherine Keiper Sherman (married 1958-1974)
- Children: 1
- Awards: Borden Award in Dairy Science (manufacturing field), 1937; D.Sc. University of Maryland, 1923, D.Sc. University of Maine, 1925

Lore Alford Rogers (7 February 1875 – 21 March 1975) was an American bacteriologist and dairy scientist. He is credited with discovering that butter made from pasteurized sweet cream remained fresher than that made from sour ripened cream, while suggesting that surplus milk could still be sold as concentrated sour milk products. He refined the steps for manufacture of high quality Swiss cheese and, new to the United States, production of Roquefort cheese. He was instrumental in finding ways to discourage fungal growth in sweetened condensed milk and preventing losses in evaporated milk from heat coagulation.

Rogers' pioneering work on freeze drying bacterial cultures had immediate applications in World War I. As Chief of the Research Laboratories of the Bureau of Dairy Industry, USDA for nearly four decades, Rogers was praised for a leadership style that allowed the "creativity of others" to be "developed and expressed." In retirement he gave back to his own community by co-founding the Patten Lumbermen's Museum.

== Early years ==
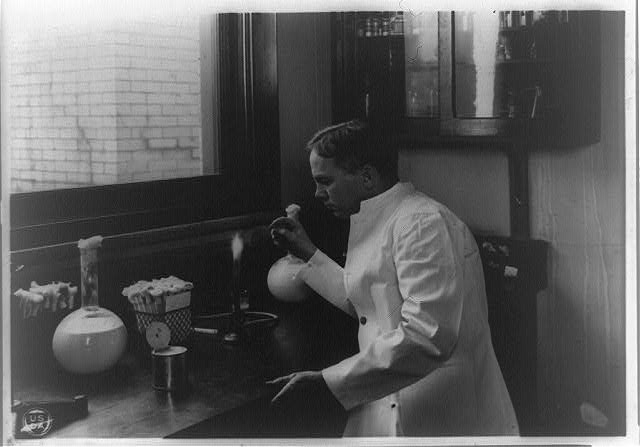
Lore Rogers, working in laboratory at the United States Department of Agriculture.

Lore [pronounced "Lo'-re," rhymes with "story"] Rogers was born in the town of Patten, Maine. His father, Col. Luther B. Rogers, was a veteran of the Civil War, and became a partner in a prominent lumbering operation called Ayer and Rogers. Lore's mother, Mary Elizabeth Barker Rogers, bore seven children, and it is said she might have become a "remarkable journalist" had she been given the chance. In an unpublished autobiography, she described the children

[as having] in common one predominating trait and that was a love of the woods and all wild things. Lore, though he loved to fish, called for a camera rather than a gun, and I believe a camera and a fishhook have always remained his only weapons. He early developed a liking for research which finally became his speciality.

Lore, like his other siblings including Lou Rogers, attended the Patten Academy, which graduated a number of highly successful individuals. He entered the University of Maine, joined its first football team, and pledged Kappa Sigma. He earned a B. S. in agriculture in 1896, especially appreciating the one course that was offered in the new science of bacteriology. Years later the campus dairy industry building would be named in his honor.

Rogers returned home to spend a season as clerk and assistant in his father's lumbering operations. He also used his photography skills to capture the experience and perils of woodsmen's lives. He was then inspired to pursue bacteriology, selecting the University of Wisconsin, which had opened the first American school of dairy science seven years earlier. He was privileged to study under Harry Luman Russell, a noted bacteriologist who earned an early PhD in that field at Johns Hopkins University. Lore Rogers remained at Wisconsin for the year 1897-1898, during which time, in addition to his studies, he helped found the Beta-Epsilon chapter of Kappa Sigma.

== New York Agricultural Experiment Station, 1899-1902 ==
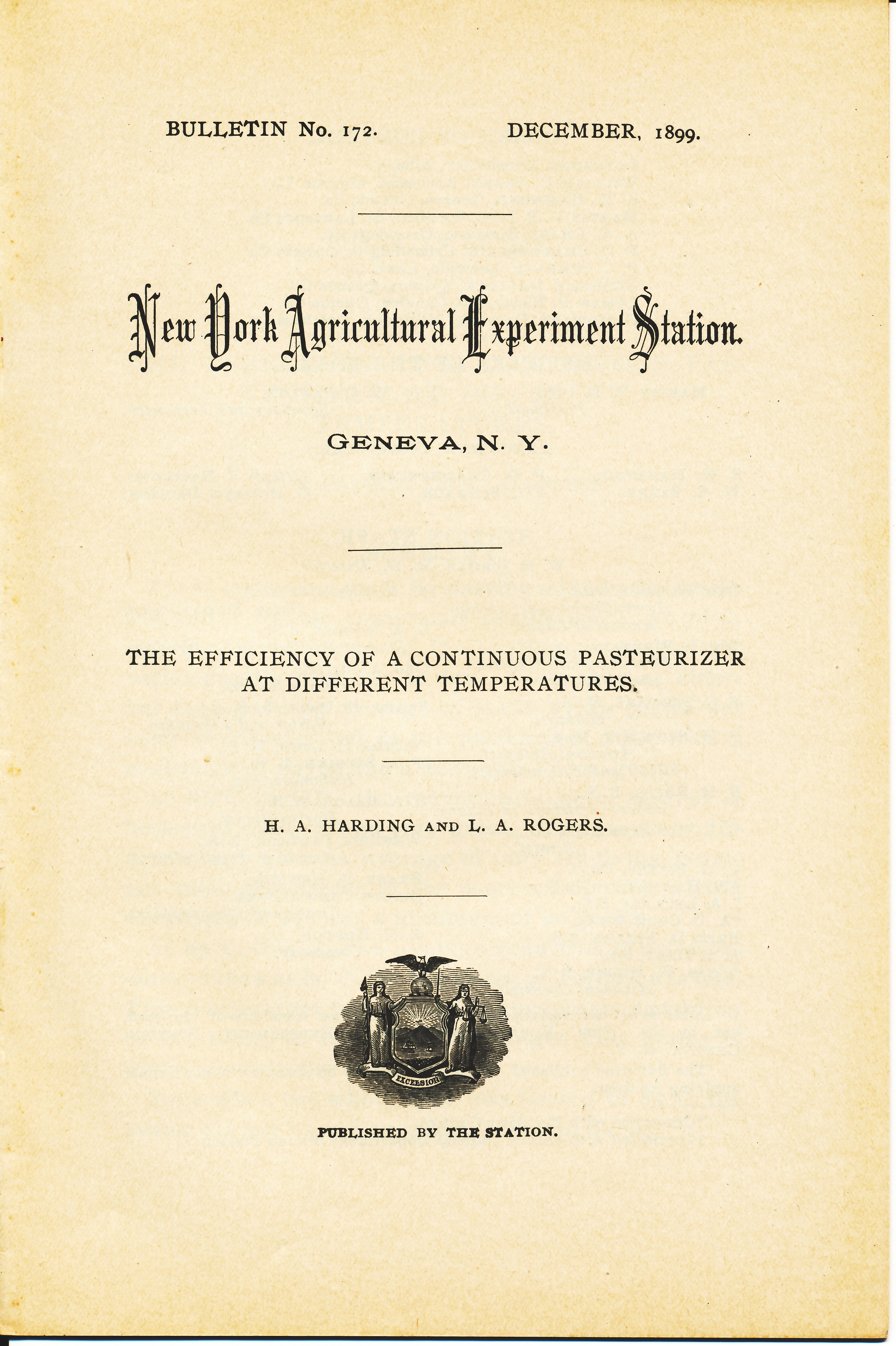
Cover of bulletin on pasteurization research co-authored by Lore Rogers, December 1899.

In 1899 Lore Rogers was offered a position as assistant bacteriologist at the New York State Agricultural Experiment Station, Geneva. The New York State Legislature had established the State Agricultural Experiment Station, which opened in 1882. It was no coincidence that two bacteriologists overlapped at Wisconsin and arrived at the experiment station in 1899. Harry Alexis Harding had been an undergraduate and graduate student at Wisconsin under H. L. Russell (and would later earn a PhD at Cornell University). Harding, with his Wisconsin M.S. degree followed by study in Europe, was appointed chief dairy bacteriologist, and Lore would serve as assistant.

The experiment station staff around 1900 included a superintendent, an animal industry specialist, two botanists, eight chemists, two bacteriologists, a dairy expert, three entomologists, three horticulturalists, an editor-librarian, and two clerk-stenographers. The two bacteriologists, Harry Harding, and Lore Rogers, collaborated on several reports on milk and cheese, with Harding listed as senior author. George A. Smith,"dairy expert" was another collaborator. Some station bulletins co-authored by Lore Rogers included "The Efficiency of a Continuous Pasteurizer at Different Temperatures" (1899), "Inspection of Babcock Milk Test Bottles" (1900), "Dairy Disagreeables Busy the Bacteriologists" (1900), and "Notes on Some Dairy Troubles" (1900).

== USDA 1902-1922 ==
Lore Rogers's research experience under Russell at Wisconsin and at the New York State Agricultural Experiment Station provided the background he needed to land a government position in 1902 with the USDA. The office was then designated as the Dairy Division of the Bureau of Animal Industry.

The Dairy Division had been established in the Bureau of Animal Industry on July 1, 1895, and authorized by the Congress 'to collect and disseminate information relating to the dairy industry of the United States.' That was precisely and exclusively what it did until 1902, when L. A. Rogers became an employee of the Division.

Rogers arrived in Washington followed by a flurry of activity. He attended his first meeting of the Society of American Bacteriologists, and with C. E. Gray was assigned an applied research project on butter, at Ames, Iowa, as animal industry staff were expected to make use of state experiment stations. When no adequate supply of milk for the research was available at Ames, the men "begged the use" of university facilities at Madison, Wisconsin. Following work in Wisconsin and Minnesota, Rogers and Gray

set up a laboratory in the kitchen and woodshed of an old house in Washington near the area now occupied by buildings of the Department of Agriculture and there completed their researches on butter. This was the first dairy products research laboratory in Washington.

Lore Rogers completed his first publications on butter. About this time he was elected to the Society of American Bacteriologists and in Washington married Beatrice Oberly, who was employed as bureau librarian. "Fishy Flavor in Butter" and "The Influence of Acidity of Cream on the Flavor of Butter" were published next. In 1909 the Dairy Research Laboratories were finally created and placed under the direction of Lore Rogers. His son, John Oberly Rogers, was born the same year. In 1911 he was selected as an official delegate representing the United States at the International Dairy Congress meeting at Stockholm. A publication on the spoiling of butter was published by the United States Department of Agriculture.

By 1914 he was developing a procedure for preserving bacterial cultures by removing gas while in their frozen state. A few years later the United States Army would adopt the technique in the preparation of typhoid vaccines during World War I.

In 1916 Lore Rogers became an advisory editor of the Journal of Bacteriology. A year later he was secretary of the Washington Branch of the Society of American Bacteriologists. In 1920 and 1921 he published articles on the manufacture of sweetened condensed milk and evaporated milk. In 1920 and 1922 he served as president of the American Society of Bacteriologists. The Society had just acquired a scientific collection of diverse microorganisms (bacteria, viruses, fungi and protozoa) and related materials, known as the American Type Culture Collection. Rogers understood its research significance, and willingly moved the entire collection in a suitcase. Years later colleague John Alford would assert "No facet of Rogers' scientific career is more important to the microbiologist of today than his involvement with the American Type Culture Collection." Two years later the National Academy of Sciences took an interest in administering the collection, and today it remains a vital resource for biological research and medical applications.

== USDA 1923-1942 ==
By now Lore Rogers had served the USDA for nearly two decades as Chief of the Research Laboratories. In 1923 the University of Maryland awarded him an honorary D. Sc. degree. He was now Dr. Rogers. Two years later his alma mater, the University of Maine, also conferred the D. Sc. degree to him. He was serving as president of the Society of American Bacteriologists and as associate editor of the Journal of Bacteriology. The World Dairy Congress was to be held in Washington in 1923, and Rogers volunteered to head the program committee. In 1928 he was off to London as a delegate to the 10th International Dairy Congress.

A most remarkable book was published in 1928. Fundamentals of Dairy Science had about 31 contributing authors. The title page, however, merely states

By Associates of Lore A. Rogers in the Research Laboratories of the Bureau of Dairy Industry United States Department of Agriculture

The dedication reads,

To Lore Alford Rogers
In recognition of his quarter-century service in the advancement of knowledge, embracing important contributions in pure science as well as its applications to industry; and because he embodies in the highest degree their ideal of unselfish devotion and untiring loyalty, alike to his work and to his fellow workers--this volume is dedicated, with admiration and affection, by those who have been privileged to serve under his leadership.

In the early 1930s Rogers was involved in research on cheese, including Swiss, cheddar, and Roquefort. He set off for the International Dairy Congress in Italy. In 1936 the Borden Company announced that it would provide cash awards and gold medals for "meritorious work in science as it is related to the dairy industry." Two recipients were selected for the first prizes: Lore A. Rogers of the USDA and Carl F. Huffman of Michigan State University. Rogers was praised for his numerous contributions to the field, noting "there is not a branch in our industry that has not felt the helping hand of his genius." In his casual, almost self-effacing style, but with serious reflection upon receiving the prize, Rogers took the opportunity to educate the next generation of researchers.

. . .the earlier investigations that seem so simple and obvious in the light of our present knowledge, so easy with the equipment now available, were anything but simple and obvious the first time they were done.

In 1942, after four decades of service, Lore Rogers, age 67 retired from the United States Department of Agriculture after a productive career with 86 papers published in scientific journals and U. S. Department of Agriculture bulletins.

== Later years ==
Lore Rogers and his wife, Beatrice, returned to Patten, Maine, following World War II. He opened a dairy business, which proved highly successful. In 1953, Rogers' wife of 47 years died.

At about the same time, he seized upon the idea of building a museum to honor and preserve the history of lumbering, the profession of his family and townsfolk and the force behind the town's development. Longtime resident, Patten Academy graduate and game warden Caleb W. Scribner joined him as co-founder, and soon they were engaged in collecting artifacts and photographs and in building displays and models to depict historic lumbering operations.

Lore Rogers married Katherine Keiper Sherman, a longtime acquaintance and the widow of a colleague. She aided in the development of the museum and helped welcome the guests who stopped by to tour the museum and to visit Lore.

Professional interests continued, and Lore Rogers was elected an honorary member of the American Society of Microbiologists. He was formally recognized by the American Dairy Science Association for his many contributions to the field. The State of Maine acknowledged Rogers' contributions to the humanities, and the Maine Legislature offered a citation. The American Society for Microbiology published a long tribute in their News to celebrate his 100th birthday. Rogers' mind remained alert, though he was increasingly impatient with physical frailty and at age 99 complained,

"I am so handicapped by my advancing years that I am obliged to spend many days in a comfortable chair before an open fire."

== Recognition and awards ==
The following awards and distinctions were bestowed on Lore A. Rogers.

- 1905 Elected to Society of American Bacteriologists
- 1911 Represented the United States at International Dairy Congress (Stockholm)
- 1923 Honorary Doctor of Science Degree from University of Maryland
- 1925 Honorary Doctor of Science Degree from University of Maine
- 1928 Represented the United States at International Dairy Congress (London)
- 1934 Represented the United States at International Dairy Congress (Rome)
- 1937 Borden Award in Dairy Manufacturing
- 1951 American Dairy Science Association Honorary Member Award
- 1962 Elected Honorary Member of American Society for Microbiology
- 1963 Distinguished Service Award from American Dairy Science Association
- 1968 Maine Commission on the Arts and Humanities Achievement Award
- 1973 Legislative Citation from Maine House of Representatives and Senate
