= Island Falls (CDP), Maine =

Island Falls, Maine
- Census-designated place
- Location within Maine Location within the United States
- Coordinates: 45°59′55″N 68°15′28″W
- Country: United States
- State: Maine
- County: Aroostook
- Town: Island Falls

Area
  - Total: 1.31 sq mi (3.40 km^{2})
  - Land: 1.26 sq mi (3.27 km^{2})
  - Water: 0.050 sq mi (0.13 km^{2})
- Elevation: 433 ft (132 m)

Population (2020)
  - Total: 309
  - Density: 244.8/sq mi (94.51/km^{2})
- Time zone: UTC-5 (Eastern (EST))
  - Summer (DST): UTC-4 (EDT)
- ZIP Code: 04747
- Area code: 207
- FIPS code: 23-35030
- GNIS feature ID: 2804664

Island Falls is a census-designated place (CDP) and the primary village in the town of Island Falls, Aroostook County, Maine, United States. It is in the northwest part of the town, situated on the West Branch Mattawamkeag River, part of the Penobscot River watershed. U.S. Route 2 passes through the village, leading northeast 27 miles (43 km) to Houlton and south 38 miles (61 km) to Mattawamkeag. Maine State Route 159 has its eastern terminus at U.S. 2 in the center of Island Falls and leads west 10 miles (16 km) to Patten. Interstate 95 passes just west of the village of Island Falls, with access from Exit 276 (Route 159); I-95 leads northeast to Houlton and southwest 92 miles (148 km) to Bangor.

Island Falls was first listed as a CDP prior to the 2020 census.

== Demographics ==
Historical population
| Census | Pop. | Note | %± |
|---|---|---|---|
| 2020 | 309 | | — |
U.S. Decennial Census
