= West Branch Mattawamkeag River =

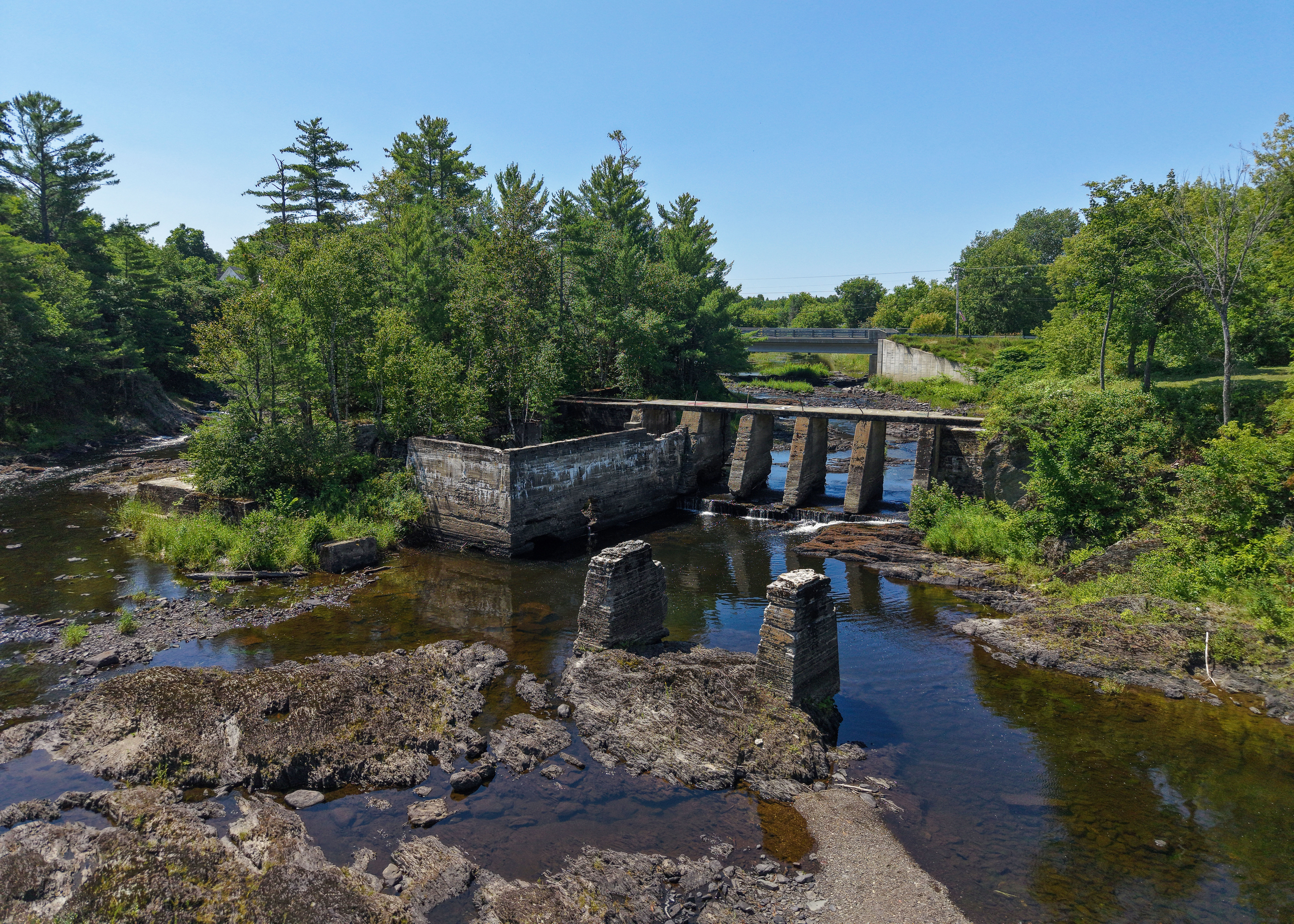
- West Branch in Island Falls

Location
- Country: United States

Physical characteristics
- Source
  - location: Maine
  - elevation: 890 feet (270 m)
- Mouth
  - location: Mattawamkeag River
  - coordinates: 45°50′01″N 67°59′28″W
  - elevation: 365 feet (111 m)
- Length: 53 miles (85 km)

Basin features
- Progression: Mattawamkeag River – Penobscot River

The West Branch Mattawamkeag River is a 52.6-mile-long (84.7 km) tributary of the Mattawamkeag River in Maine. From its source (46°08′07″N 68°30′09″W) in Maine Township 6, Range 6, WELS, the river runs 10 miles (16 km) northeast by Pleasant Lake and through Mud Lake and Rockabema Lake, then 42 miles (68 km) south and southeast through Upper Mattawamkeag Lake and Mattawamkeag Lake to its confluence with the East Branch Mattawamkeag River in Haynesville, about 10 miles (16 km) west of the Canada–United States border.

== Mattawamkeag Lake ==
Mattawamkeag Lake
- Location within Maine
- Location: Aroostook County, Maine
- Coordinates: 45°59′N 68°10′W
- Primary inflows: Upper Mattawamkeag Lake
- Basin countries: United States
- Max. length: 3.5 mi (5.6 km)
- Max. width: 2 mi (3.2 km)
- Surface area: 3,323 acres (1,345 ha)
- Max. depth: 47 feet (14 m)
- Water volume: 7,662 acre⋅ft (9,451,000 m^{3})
- Surface elevation: 430 ft (130 m)

Mattawamkeag Lake is 4 miles (6.4 km) east (downstream) of Island Falls. There is a good boat launching area on Upper Mattawamkeag Lake on the east side of U.S. Route 2 about 2 kilometres (1.2 mi) north of Island Falls. Upper Mattawamkeag Lake is at the same level as Mattawamkeag Lake, and boats can easily navigate the short thoroughfare from the south end of Upper Mattawamkeag Lake to the north end of Mattawamkeag Lake. For decades there was a dam at the south end of Mattawamkeag Lake controlling overflow to the West Branch Mattawamkeag River. Water level dropped several feet when the dam was abandoned; and the lake shoreline is rocky where wave action eroded shallow soil. The two lakes provide good habitat for chain pickerel, smallmouth bass and white perch.

== See also ==
- List of rivers of Maine
