= William Sewall House =

Historic house in Maine, United States

- U.S. National Register of Historic Places
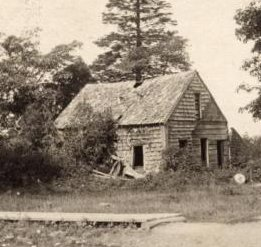
- Photograph c. 1910

- Location within Maine Location within the United States
- Location: 1027 Crystal Rd., Island Falls, Maine
- Coordinates: 46°0′30″N 68°16′11″W
- Area: 0.3 acres (0.12 ha)
- Built: 1865
- Architect: Osgood Pingree
- Architectural style: Greek Revival
- NRHP reference No.: 82000740
- Added to NRHP: April 12, 1982

The William Sewall House is a historic house at 1027 Crystal Road in Island Falls, Maine. Built in 1865, it is a well-preserved example of vernacular Greek Revival style in a rural setting. The house is notable as the longtime home of a second-generation resident of the community, William Wingate Sewall, who had a long and enduring friendship with Theodore Roosevelt, a regular guest until 1878. The house was listed on the National Register of Historic Places in 1982. It is still in the hands of Sewall descendants, operated as a yoga retreat center.

== Description and history ==
The Sewall House is located on the north side of Crystal Road (Maine State Route 159) just west of the Island Falls Post Office in the village center. It is a 2 1/2-story wood-frame structure, three bays wide, with a side-gable roof, twin interior chimneys, and clapboard siding. A single-story hip-roofed porch extends across the south-facing front and around the right side, supported by square posts. The front entrance is flanked by sidelight windows and pilasters. A two-bay two-story garage extends to the right, connecting the main house to a carriage barn.

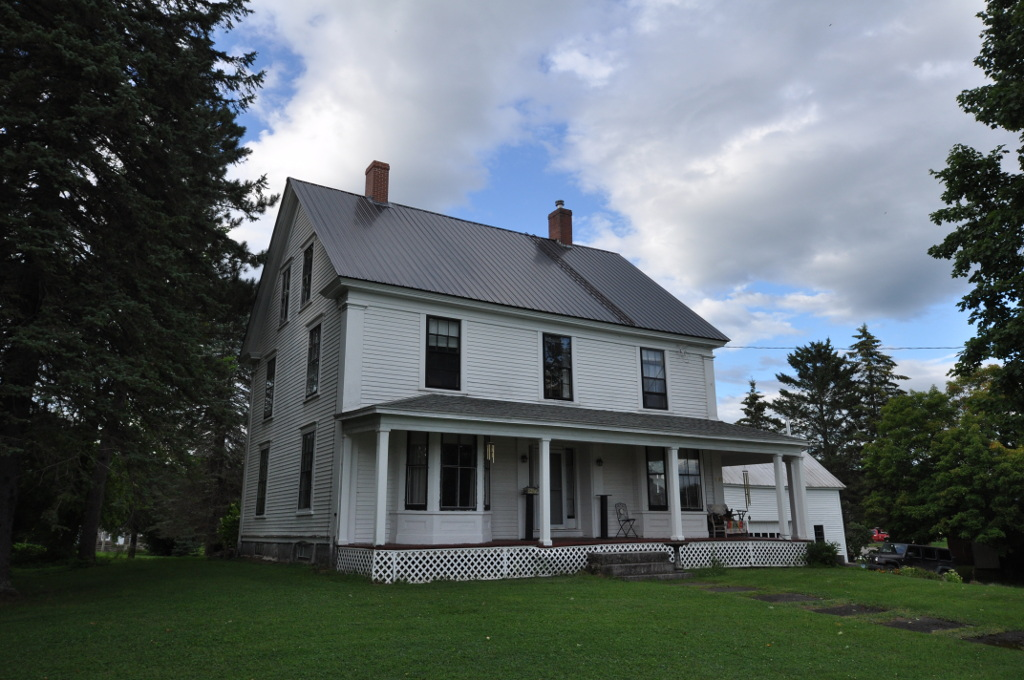
The house in 2015

One of the first settlers of the town of Island Falls was Levi Sewall, who arrived in 1842. His tenth child, William Wingate Sewall, was born in 1845, and was the community's first native-born resident. The younger Sewall made his home in the town for his entire life, working on Maine's logging drives until he was 75. This house was built for Sewall by Osgood Pingree, a neighbor. Sewall's house was a well-known stop for hunters who worked and recreated in the Maine woods. In 1872 Theodore Roosevelt, then a somewhat sickly young man, paid a visit, and established a friendship with Sewall that lasted until Roosevelt's death in 1919. Roosevelt last visited Sewall in Maine in 1878, but invited him on one of his expeditions into the Dakota Territory in 1884. Roosevelt stayed in the house three different times.

== Yoga retreat ==
The house remains in the hands of Sewall's descendants. Since 1997 the house has been operated by yoga instructor Donna Amrita Davidge as a yoga retreat center. Davidge is a great-granddaughter of Sewall. The menu at the yoga retreat is vegetarian and vegan. Specific yoga retreats are offered for groups such as women, writers, and artists. In 2023, USA Today named Sewall House #2 on the list of 10 Best Yoga Retreats in the US. The yoga retreat operates from May through October.

== See also ==
- National Register of Historic Places listings in Aroostook County, Maine
