= Mattawamkeag River =

River in Maine, United States

Location
- Country: United States

Physical characteristics
- Source
  - location: Maine
  - elevation: 365 feet (111 m)
- Mouth
  - location: Penobscot River
  - coordinates: 45°31′08″N 68°21′40″W
  - elevation: 190 feet (58 m)
- Length: 51 mi (82 km)

Basin features
- Tributaries
  - left: East Branch Mattawamkeag River
  - right: West Branch Mattawamkeag River, Molunkus Stream

The Mattawamkeag River is a river in Maine. From the confluence of its East Branch and West Branch (45°50′00″N 67°59′27″W) in Haynesville, about 10 miles (16 km) west of the Canada–United States border, the river runs 50.6 miles (81.4 km) south and west to its mouth on the Penobscot River in Mattawamkeag.

== See also ==
- List of rivers of Maine
