= Amelia Himes Walker =

American suffragist and women's rights activist

Amelia "Mimi" Himes Walker (July 24, 1880 – July 19, 1974) was an American suffragist and women's rights activist. Walker was one of the Silent Sentinels who picketed outside of the White House for women's right to vote. She was arrested in 1917 and sentenced to 60 days in the workhouse. After women secured the right to vote, Walker continued to honor the efforts of the suffragists. She also promoted the Equal Rights Amendment (ERA).

== Biography ==
Walker was born in New Oxford, Pennsylvania on July 24, 1880 into a family of Quakers and grew up there with five siblings. She graduated from York Collegiate Institute in 1898. Walker then went to Swarthmore College where she met Alice Paul who was also attending the school. Walker also became a member of Kappa Kappa Gamma and graduated from Swarthmore in 1902. She had also met her future husband, Robert Hunt Walker, at Swarthmore. In June of 1910, the couple were married in New Oxford and planned to move to Baltimore where Robert worked.

The couple moved into Robert's family home, Drumquhazel, outside of Towson, Maryland. They raised three children there and the home also served as a place for entertaining and for suffragists, such as her close friend, Edith Hooker, to meet. Walker joined the National Woman's Party (NWP) at some point before 1917. The suffragists, including Walker, called on President Woodrow Wilson to urge the Maryland Legislature to include women's suffrage during the extra session in April of 1917.

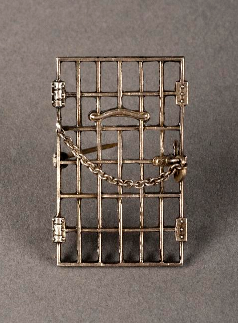
Amelia Himes Walker's Jailed for Freedom Pin, 1917

On July 14, 1917, Walker, Hooker and several other women were arrested for "obstructing traffic" while picketing for women's suffrage outside of the White House. When brought before the court, Walker said to the judge, "President Wilson said in 1915 that he believed in woman suffrage. We are only asking him, by the silent appeal of our banners, to convert his words into deeds. Why should he expect us to help him establish democracy in Europe when he is not willing to grant us democracy in the United States?" She and the other 15 women were sentenced to 60 days in the workhouse or to pay a $25 fine. Her husband attempted to pay the fine in order to release her, but Walker refused and said she would complete her prison sentence. The women were eventually pardoned by President Wilson not long after their arrest due to public outcry. However, the women refused the pardon and went on to the workhouse. For her arrest, she was later awarded the "Jailed For Freedom" pin. She later donated the pin to the Smithsonian Museum in 1959.

After women earned the right to vote, Walker continued to support women's rights, including supporting the Equal Rights Amendment (ERA). Walker continued to work with the NWP and pressed for an amendment every year since 1923. Walker served as a president of the Maryland branch of NWP. She unsuccessfully ran for office in 1930, though she was the first woman to run for a seat in the Maryland House of Delegates from Baltimore County.

Walker and her family moved to Florida after her husband's death in 1948. She worked as a lecturer at Rollins College. Walker also continued to travel and attend events remembering women's suffrage and promoting the ERA. Walker died in her home in Winter Park, Florida on July 19, 1974.
