= Molunkus Stream =

Location
- Country: United States

Physical characteristics
- Source
  - location: Maine
  - elevation: 465 feet (142 m)
- Mouth
  - location: Mattawamkeag River
  - coordinates: 45°33′05″N 68°13′21″W
  - elevation: 295 feet (90 m)
- Length: 36 mi (58 km)

Basin features
- Progression: Mattawamkeag River – Penobscot River

Molunkus Stream is a tributary of the Mattawamkeag River in Maine. From the confluence of the stream's East Branch and West Branch (45°53′50″N 68°24′20″W) in Sherman, the river runs 35.6 miles (57.3 km) southeast to its mouth on the Mattawamkeag in Kingman.

== See also ==
- List of rivers of Maine
