= Island Falls, Maine =

Town in Maine, United States

- Town
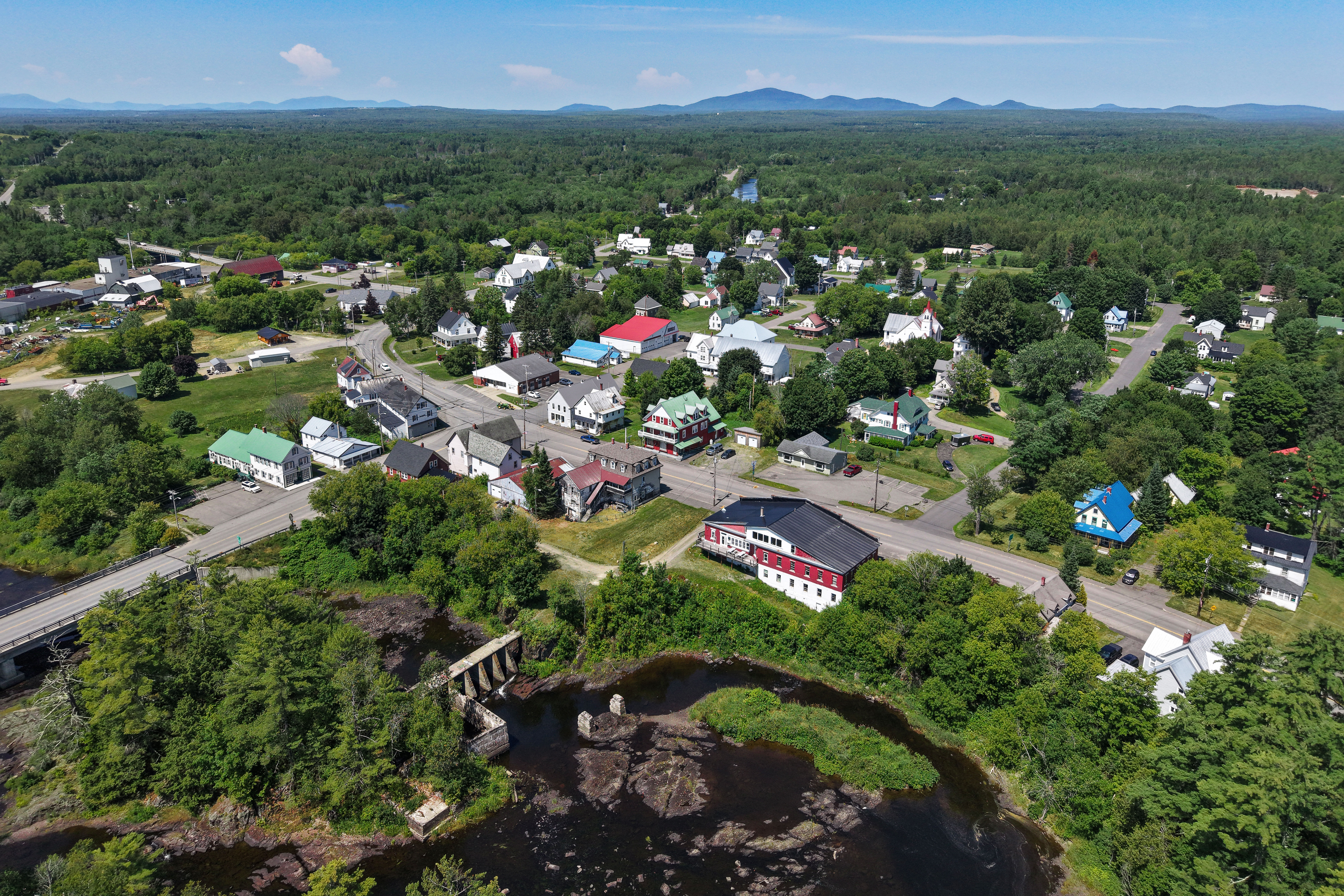
- Downtown, 2026

- Location of Island Falls, Maine
- Coordinates: 46°00′18″N 68°14′33″W
- Country: United States
- State: Maine
- County: Aroostook

Area
  - Total: 40.76 sq mi (105.57 km^{2})
  - Land: 36.03 sq mi (93.32 km^{2})
  - Water: 4.73 sq mi (12.25 km^{2})
- Elevation: 446 ft (136 m)

Population (2020)
  - Total: 802
  - Density: 21/sq mi (8.1/km^{2})
- Time zone: UTC-5 (Eastern (EST))
  - Summer (DST): UTC-4 (EDT)
- ZIP code: 04747
- Area code: 207
- FIPS code: 23-35065
- GNIS feature ID: 582529
- Website: www.islandfallsme.us

Island Falls is a town in Aroostook County, Maine, United States. The population was 758 at the 2020 census. The primary village of Island Falls in the town is situated at a falls in the West Branch Mattawamkeag River.

== Geography ==
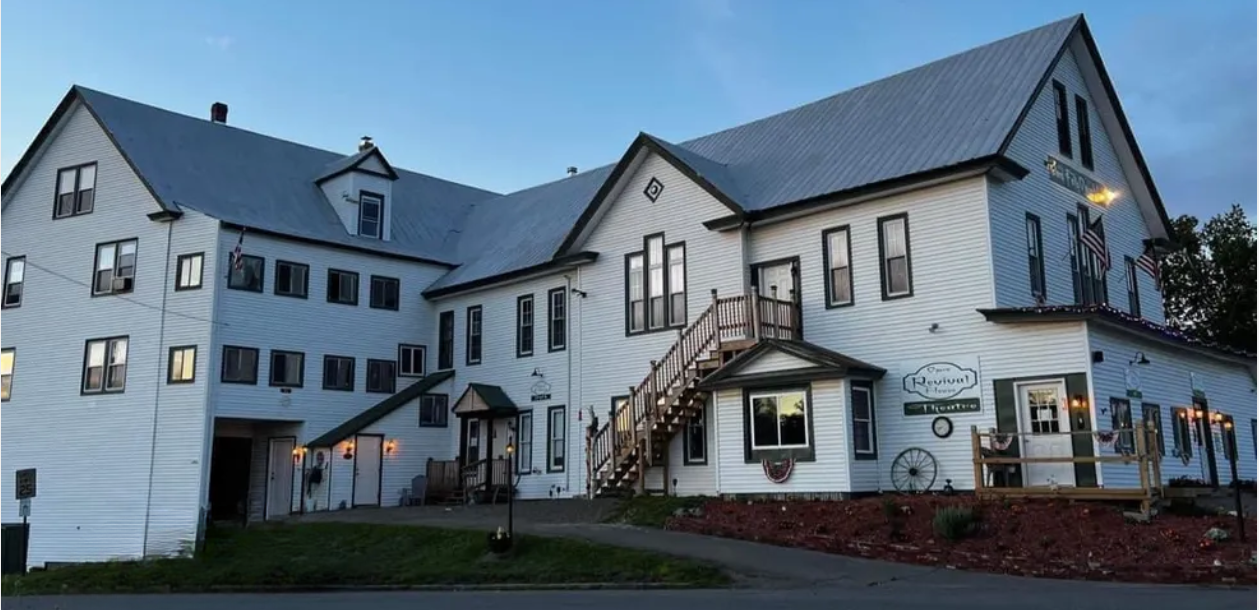
Island Falls Opera House

According to the United States Census Bureau, the town has a total area of 40.76 square miles (105.57 km^{2}), of which 36.03 square miles (93.32 km^{2}) is land and 4.73 square miles (12.25 km^{2}) is water. Island Falls also has two main lakes, Pleasant and Mattawamkeag.

== Demographics ==
Historical population
Census	Pop.	Note	%±
1870	183		—
1880	236		29.0%
1890	223		−5.5%
1900	1,063		376.7%
1910	1,686		58.6%
1920	1,683		−0.2%
1930	1,455		−13.5%
1940	1,370		−5.8%
1950	1,237		−9.7%
1960	1,018		−17.7%
1970	913		−10.3%
1980	981		7.4%
1990	897		−8.6%
2000	793		−11.6%
2010	837		5.5%
2020	758		−9.4%
U.S. Decennial Census

=== 2020 census ===
As of the census of 2020, there were 758 people, 330 households living in the town. There were 629 housing units. The racial makeup of the town was 93.5% White, 0.1% African American, 1.3% Native American, 0.9% Asian, 0.1% from other races, and 4.0% from two or more races. Hispanic or Latino of any race were 1.5% of the population.

Of the 330 households, of which 23.5% had children under the age of 18 living with them, 50.9% were married couples living together, 29.7% had a female householder with no husband present, 24.8% had a male householder with no wife present. The average family size was 3.14.

The median age in the town was 51.1 years. The gender makeup of the town was 49.6% male and 50.4% female.

The median household income in 2022 was estimated to be $50,441. About 24.4% of the population was below the poverty line, including 43.2% of those under age 18 and 12.4% of those age 65 or over.

12.1% of the residents of Island Falls were military veterans.

=== 2010 census ===
As of the census of 2010, there were 837 people, 357 households, and 228 families living in the town. The population density was 23.2 inhabitants per square mile (9.0/km^{2}). There were 655 housing units at an average density of 18.2 per square mile (7.0/km^{2}). The racial makeup of the town was 97.4% White, 0.4% African American, 0.8% Native American, 0.1% Asian, 0.2% from other races, and 1.1% from two or more races. Hispanic or Latino of any race were 2.0% of the population.

There were 357 households, of which 25.8% had children under the age of 18 living with them, 49.0% were married couples living together, 11.5% had a female householder with no husband present, 3.4% had a male householder with no wife present, and 36.1% were non-families. 31.9% of all households were made up of individuals, and 19.3% had someone living alone who was 65 years of age or older. The average household size was 2.31 and the average family size was 2.88.

The median age in the town was 46.4 years. 21.5% of residents were under the age of 18; 6.2% were between the ages of 18 and 24; 20.7% were from 25 to 44; 31.5% were from 45 to 64; and 20% were 65 years of age or older. The gender makeup of the town was 49.6% male and 50.4% female.

=== 2000 census ===
At the 2000 census, there were 793 people, 346 households and 229 families living in the town. The population density was 22.1 per square mile (8.5/km^{2}). There were 635 housing units at an average density of 17.7 per square mile (6.8/km^{2}). The racial makeup of the town was 99.12% White, 0.76% Native American and 0.13% Asian. Hispanic or Latino of any race were 0.88% of the population.

There were 346 households, of which 26.9% had children under the age of 18 living with them, 55.2% were married couples living together, 8.7% had a female householder with no husband present, and 33.8% were non-families. 28.6% of all households were made up of individuals, and 14.2% had someone living alone who was 65 years of age or older. The average household size was 2.29 and the average family size was 2.81.

21.1% of the population was under the age of 18, 8.6% from 18 to 24, 24.1% from 25 to 44, 28.1% from 45 to 64, and 18.2% who were 65 years of age or older. The median age was 43 years. For every 100 females, there were 90.6 males. For every 100 females age 18 and over, there were 92.0 males.

The median household income was $27,083, and the median family income was $35,375. Males had a median income of $32,019 versus $19,028 for females. The per capita income for the town was $15,132. About 10.5% of families and 14.2% of the population were below the poverty line, including 19.1% of those under age 18 and 11.6% of those age 65 or over.

== Places of interest ==
- Island Falls Opera House
- William Sewall House
- VA JO WA Golf course
- The Slice Restaurant
- VA JO WA Maple
