= Haynesville, Maine =

Town in Maine, United States

- Town
- Location of Haynesville, Maine
- Coordinates: 45°46′53″N 68°00′15″W
- Country: United States
- State: Maine
- County: Aroostook

Area
  - Total: 41.90 sq mi (108.52 km^{2})
  - Land: 41.38 sq mi (107.17 km^{2})
  - Water: 0.52 sq mi (1.35 km^{2})
- Elevation: 394 ft (120 m)

Population (2020)
  - Total: 97
  - Density: 2.3/sq mi (0.9/km^{2})
- Time zone: UTC-5 (Eastern (EST))
  - Summer (DST): UTC-4 (EDT)
- ZIP code: 04497
- Area code: 207
- FIPS code: 23-32195
- GNIS feature ID: 582515
- Website: https://haynesvilleme.gov/

Haynesville is a town in southeast Aroostook County, Maine, United States. The population was 97 at the 2020 census.

== Geography ==
According to the United States Census Bureau, the town has a total area of 41.90 square miles (108.52 km^{2}), of which 41.38 square miles (107.17 km^{2}) is land and 0.52 square miles (1.35 km^{2}) is water.

== Demographics ==
Historical population
Census	Pop.	Note	%±
1850	96		—
1860	169		76.0%
1870	165		−2.4%
1880	224		35.8%
1890	280		25.0%
1900	316		12.9%
1910	272		−13.9%
1920	349		28.3%
1930	251		−28.1%
1940	235		−6.4%
1950	185		−21.3%
1960	187		1.1%
1970	157		−16.0%
1980	169		7.6%
1990	243		43.8%
2000	122		−49.8%
2010	121		−0.8%
2020	97		−19.8%
U.S. Decennial Census

=== 2010 census ===
At the 2010 census there were 121 people, 56 households, and 38 families living in the town. The population density was 2.9 inhabitants per square mile (1.1/km^{2}). There were 107 housing units at an average density of 2.6 per square mile (1.0/km^{2}). The racial makeup of the town was 98.3% White, 0.8% Native American, and 0.8% from two or more races. Hispanic or Latino of any race were 2.5%.

Of the 56 households 17.9% had children under the age of 18 living with them, 60.7% were married couples living together, 7.1% had a female householder with no husband present, and 32.1% were non-families. 32.1% of households were one person and 10.8% were one person aged 65 or older. The average household size was 2.16 and the average family size was 2.66.

The median age in the town was 49.5 years. 15.7% of residents were under the age of 18; 4.9% were between the ages of 18 and 24; 19% were from 25 to 44; 45.3% were from 45 to 64; and 14.9% were 65 or older. The gender makeup of the town was 55.4% male and 44.6% female.

=== 2000 census ===
At the 2000 census there were 122 people, 45 households, and 34 families living in the town. The population density was 3.0 people per square mile (1.1/km^{2}). There were 88 housing units at an average density of 2.1 per square mile (0.8/km^{2}). The racial makeup of the town was 99.18% White and 0.82% Asian. Of the 45 households 24.4% had children under the age of 18 living with them, 62.2% were married couples living together, 8.9% had a female householder with no husband present, and 24.4% were non-families. 20.0% of households were one person and 8.9% were one person aged 65 or older. The average household size was 2.71 and the average family size was 3.12.

The age distribution was 26.2% under the age of 18, 6.6% from 18 to 24, 28.7% from 25 to 44, 23.0% from 45 to 64, and 15.6% 65 or older. The median age was 41 years. For every 100 females, there were 84.8 males. For every 100 females age 18 and over, there were 100.0 males.

The median household income was $23,542 and the median family income was $23,333. Males had a median income of $22,250 versus $20,417 for females. The per capita income for the town was $11,200. There were 5.6% of families and 9.7% of the population living below the poverty line, including 6.5% of under eighteens and 10.7% of those over 64.

== In popular culture ==
The area of Haynesville is referenced in country music performer Dick Curless's song "A Tombstone Every Mile". The song refers to the "Haynesville Woods", an area with a stretch of road a part of U.S. 2A noted for many motor vehicle accidents. Truck drivers used to ship potatoes to market in Boston and a dangerous hairpin turn in the route through Haynesville was the inspiration for the song.
