= Maine State Route 155 =

State highway in Maine, US

State Route 155

Route information
- Maintained by MaineDOT
- Length: 34.3 mi (55.2 km)

Major junctions
- South end: SR 11 / SR 221 in Bradford
- I-95 in Howland; US 2 in Enfield
- North end: US 2 / SR 6 in Lincoln

Location
- Country: United States
- State: Maine
- Counties: Penobscot, Piscataquis

Highway system
- Maine State Highway System; Interstate; US; State; Auto trails; Lettered highways
| ← SR 154 | → SR 156 |

State Route 155 (SR 155) is a 34.3-mile-long (55.2 km) state highway in the U.S. state of Maine. It runs in a southwesterly-northeasterly direction (but is signed as south–north) mostly in Penobscot County. It connects the town of Bradford at SR 11 and SR 221 with Lincoln at U.S. Route 2 (US 2) and SR 6.

== Route description ==
SR 155 begins in the town center of Bradford at an intersection with SR 11 (which heads west and north from this point) and SR 221 (which has its northern terminus here). It heads east through a mostly rural area passing the town hall of Bradford before climbing a small hill and making a 90-degree bend to the north at Bradford Corners. After passing the former town hall and the local post office, it alternates heading north and northeast before briefly entering Piscataquis County in its unincorporated Southeast Piscataquis. After leaving Piscataquis County, it re-enters Penobscot County in the town of Lagrange. In its town center, SR 155 intersects SR 6 and SR 16. SR 6 joins SR 155 on a concurrency northeast through rural areas of Lagrange before turning east as it enters Howland. After a long stretch of heading through forestland, SR 6 and SR 155 has an interchange with Interstate 95 at its exit 217. East of the interchange, the road, carrying the name Lagrange Road, heads past some small businesses before entering the more urbanized area of Howland with houses lining both sides of the street. The road reaches a roundabout with River Road and Coffin Street. SR 6 and SR 155 briefly head south along Coffin Street passing a general store before curving to the east along County Road.

At Argyle Road, SR 116 joins the road before the three state routes cross the Penobscot River on the Howland-Enfield Bridge, a five-span through truss bridge. The bridge is currently undergoing replacement by a new steel/concrete beam bridge by contractor Reed & Reed. Bridge crosses the river just south of its confluence with the Piscataquis River and also crosses a narrow strip of the Penobscot Indian Island Reservation. Upon entering the town of Enfield, the road passes in front of various businesses before coming to an intersection with US 2. At this point, SR 6 and SR 116 head north along US 2 while SR 155 alone heads east through a mostly wooded area. In the town center, SR 155 reaches the western terminus of SR 188 and turns north along Enfield Road. The road skirts the western end of Cold Stream Pond; numerous private roads branch off from SR 155 leading to houses along the lake shoreline. A road provides access to the Cold Stream Pond Recreation Area and Morgan Beach. As the road traverses a ridge line (though several small hills rise to the east of the road), SR 155 passes several small farms just after entering Lincoln. The road comes into a residential neighborhood of Lincoln before crossing a stream, entering the business district, and ending at US 2 and SR 6 (Broadway to the west, Main Street to the north).

== Major junctions ==
| County | Location | mi | km | Destinations | Notes |
|---|---|---|---|---|---|
| Penobscot | Bradford | 0.0 | 0.0 | SR 11 (West Road) / SR 221 south (Main Road) – Charleston, Hudson, North Bradford | Northern terminus of SR 221 |
| Piscataquis | No major junctions | | | | |
| Penobscot | Lagrange | 9.6 | 15.4 | SR 6 west / SR 16 (Bennoch Road) – Milo, Orono | Southern end of SR 6 concurrency |
| Penobscot | Howland | 20.0– 20.2 | 32.2– 32.5 | I-95 – Bangor, Medway | Exit 217 (I-95) |
| Penobscot | Howland | 21.3 | 34.3 | SR 116 south (Argyle Road) – Argyle | Southern end of SR 116 concurrency |
| Penobscot | Enfield | 21.9 | 35.2 | US 2 / SR 6 east / SR 116 north (Main Road) – Lincoln, Old Town | Northern end of SR 6 / SR 116 concurrencies |
| Penobscot | Enfield | 25.7 | 41.4 | SR 188 east (Lowell Road) – East Lowell | Western terminus of SR 188 |
| Penobscot | Lincoln | 34.3 | 55.2 | US 2 / SR 6 (Main Street / Broadway) – Houlton, Bangor | |
1.000 mi = 1.609 km; 1.000 km = 0.621 mi: Concurrency terminus
