= Maine State Route 116 =

State highway in Penobscot County, Maine, US

State Route 116
- SR 116 highlighted in red

Route information
- Maintained by MaineDOT
- Length: 56.40 mi (90.77 km)

Major junctions
- South end: SR 16 in Old Town
- SR 6 / SR 155 in Howland; US 2 / SR 6 in Enfield
- North end: SR 11 / SR 157 in Medway

Location
- Country: United States
- State: Maine
- Counties: Penobscot

Highway system
- Maine State Highway System; Interstate; US; State; Auto trails; Lettered highways
← SR 115	→ SR 117

State Route 116 (SR 116) is part of Maine's system of numbered state highways, located in Penobscot County. It runs for 56.42 miles (90.80 km) from Old Town to Medway.

== Route description ==
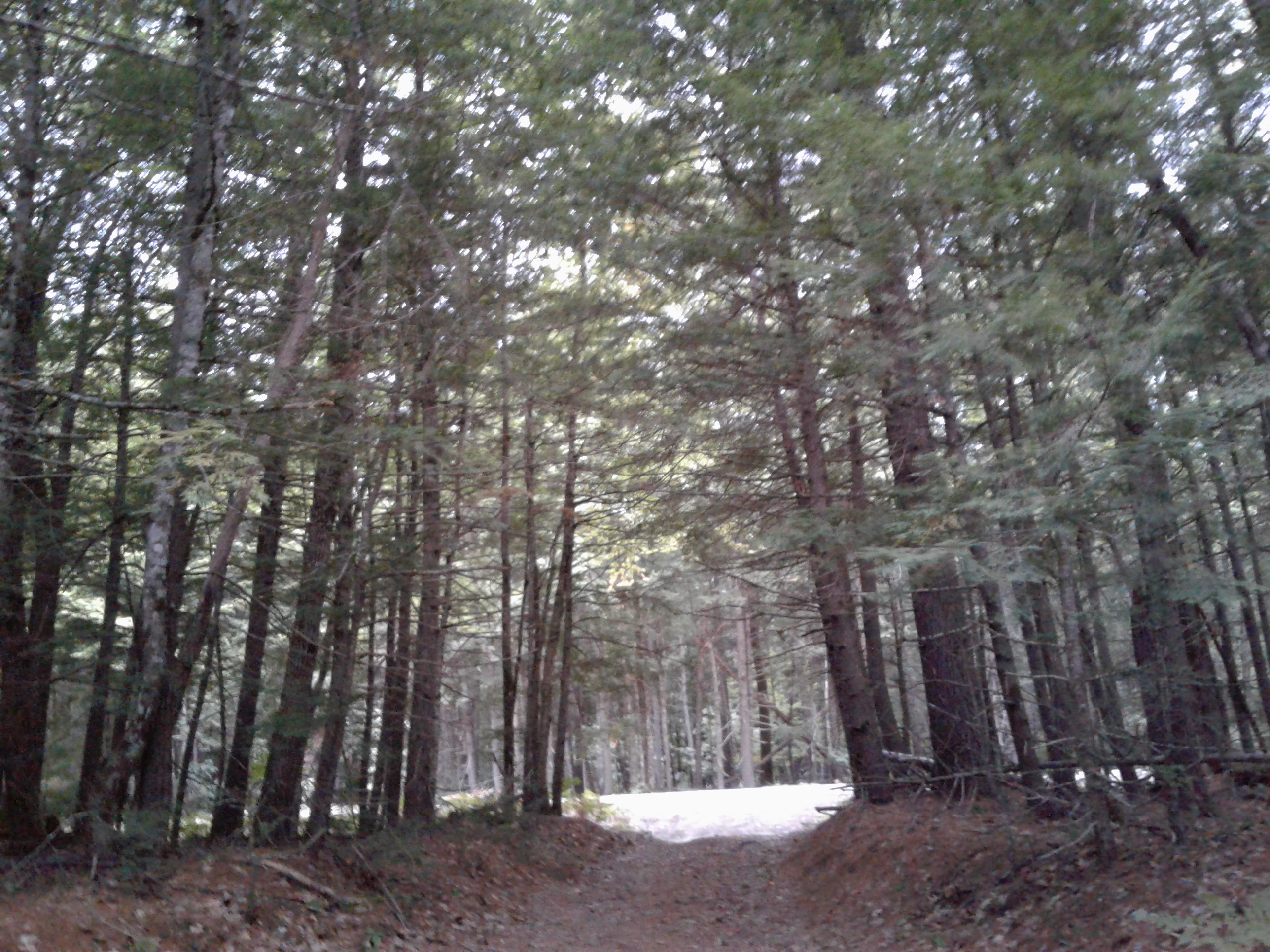
SR-116 in Mattamiscontis

SR 116 begins at SR 16 at Old Town. It heads east towards the Penobscot River, running parallel with it to the junction with State Routes 6 and 155 in Howland. SR 116 then meets U.S. Route 2 in Enfield. SR 116 and SR 6 follows U.S. Route 2 to Lincoln, Maine while SR 155 continues east from Enfield. SR 116 splits off U.S. Route 2 and SR 6 just south of Lincoln. The route heads northwest, crossing the Penobscot River again. The route then turns right from the Mattamiscontis Road intersection to the town of Chester. After passing Chester, the route keeps heading north towards Interstate 95 without an interchange and goes to the town of Medway, where the route ends at State Routes 11 and 157.

== Major junctions ==
The entire route is in Penobscot County.

Location	mi	km	Destinations	Notes
Old Town	0.00	0.00	SR 16 (Bennoch Road) – Orono, Milo	
Howland	21.37	34.39	SR 6 west / SR 155 south (County Road) to Terrio Street / I-95 – Lagrange, Milo	Southern end of SR 6 / SR 155 concurrencies
Penobscot River	21.38– 21.56	34.41– 34.70	Enfield-Howland Bridge	
Enfield	21.97	35.36	US 2 west (Main Road) / SR 155 north (Hammett Road) – Enfield, Old Town	Northern end of SR 155 concurrency; southern end of US 2 concurrency
Lincoln	32.18	51.79	US 2 east / SR 6 east (West Broadway) / Penobscot Valley Avenue – Lincoln, Mattawamkeag	Northern end of US 2 / SR 6 concurrencies
Medway	56.40	90.77	SR 11 / SR 157 (Medway Road)	
1.000 mi = 1.609 km; 1.000 km = 0.621 mi: Concurrency terminus
