= John B. Curtis Free Public Library =

- U.S. National Register of Historic Places
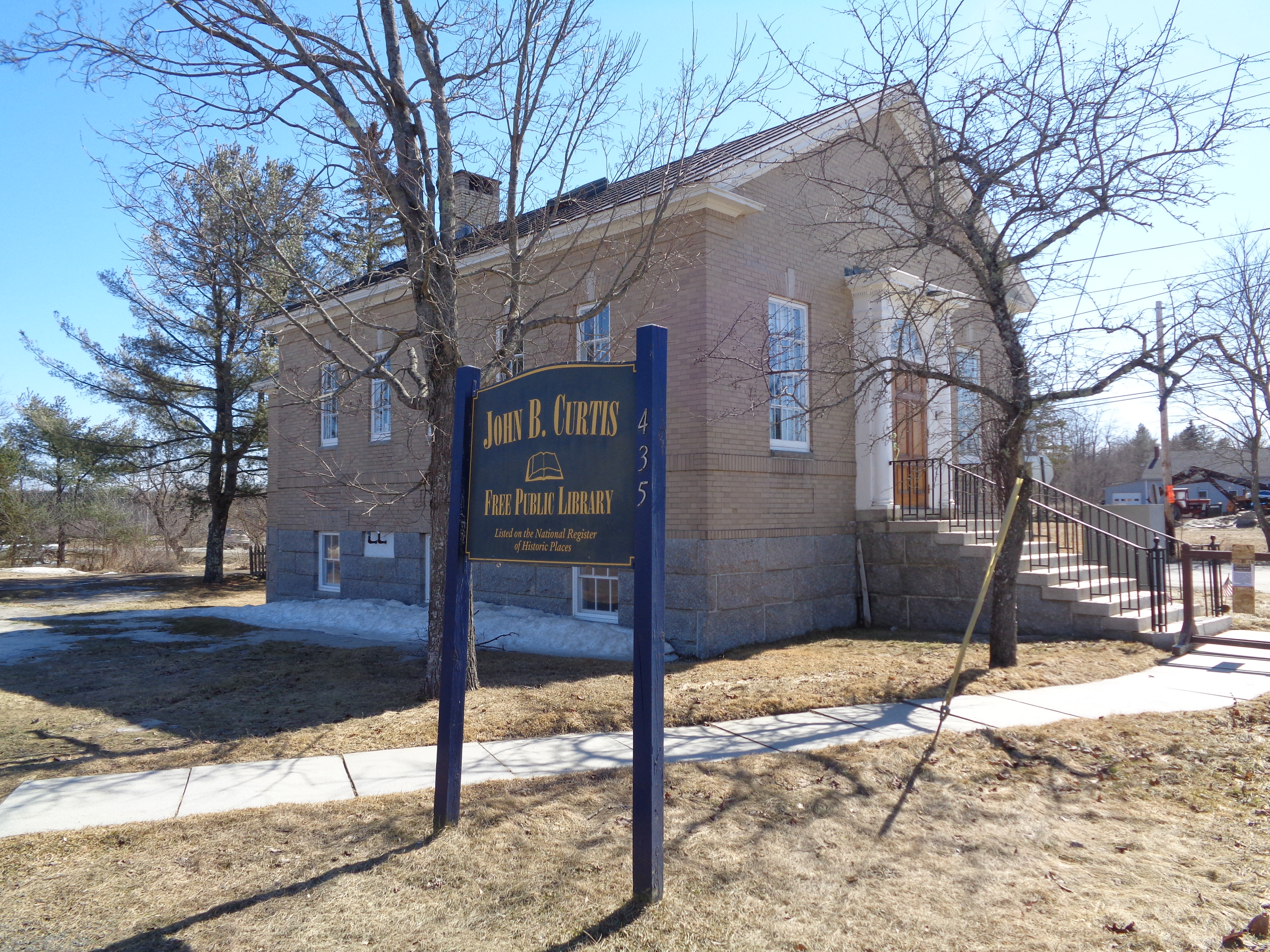

- Location within Maine Location within the United States
- Location: 435 Main Road, Bradford, Maine
- Coordinates: 45°4′3″N 68°56′13″W
- Area: less than one acre
- Built: 1915
- Architect: John Calvin Stevens, John Howard Stevens
- Architectural style: Classical Revival
- MPS: Maine Public Libraries MPS
- NRHP reference No.: 97000310
- Added to NRHP: April 14, 1997

The John B. Curtis Free Public Library is the public library of Bradford, Maine. It is located at 435 Main Road in the village center, in an architecturally distinguished 1915 Classical Revival building designed by John Calvin Stevens and John Howard Stevens. The building was listed on the National Register of Historic Places in 1997.

== Architecture and history ==
The John B. Curtis Free Public Library is located at the crossroads that defines the rural village center of Bradford, a rural community north of Bangor. It stands at the northeast corner of Main and East Roads, the former marked with Maine State Routes 11 and 221, and the latter with SR 155. It is a modest single-story masonry structure, built of brick and set on a raised foundation of rough-cut granite. The main facade faces west toward Main Road, and is three bays wide, with keystoned sash windows flanking a center entrance. The entrance is gained via broad granite steps, and is framed by Ionic pilasters and a broad entablature, with a half-round fanlight window above. A small ell extends the building to the rear. Inside is a vestibule leading to a single large chamber in the main block, with a small chamber and stairs to the basement in the ell. The transition from the vestibule to the main room is marked by a Colonial Revival arch, which is echoed in the framing of the fireplace on the opposite wall.

The library was built in 1914–15, with funding from a bequest by John Bacon Curtis, who was raised in Bradford and made a business fortune developing machinery for the shaping and packaging of spruce gum. It was a collaborative design of Portland architect John Calvin Stevens and his son John Howard Stevens, and is the most distinctively Classical Revival library design of the elder Stevens.

== See also ==
- National Register of Historic Places listings in Penobscot County, Maine
