= Maine State Route 221 =

State highway in Penobscot County, Maine, US

State Route 221

Route information
- Maintained by MaineDOT
- Length: 15.94 mi (25.65 km)
- Existed: 1931–present

Major junctions
- South end: SR 15 in Bangor
- SR 43 in Hudson
- North end: SR 11 / SR 155 in Bradford

Location
- Country: United States
- State: Maine
- Counties: Penobscot

Highway system
- Maine State Highway System; Interstate; US; State; Auto trails; Lettered highways
← SR 220	→ SR 222

State Route 221 (SR 221) is state highway located in Penobscot County in central Maine. It begins at State Route 15 in Bangor and runs north to Bradford, where it ends at State Route 11 and State Route 155.

== Route description ==
SR 221 begins at SR 15 (Broadway) at the northern end of Bangor. It then heads north, near Pushaw Lake but not along it. Entering Hudson, SR 221 intersects SR 43. The two routes have a 2.3-mile-long (3.7 km) concurrency before SR 43 branches off to the east. SR 221 continues in its northward direction, entering the town of Bradford. SR 221 terminates at a four-way intersection in the town center, which is also the western terminus of SR 155. The road continues north as SR 11 towards Milo. SR 11 southbound runs to the west and SR 155 begins to the east.

== History ==
SR 221 was first designated in 1931 over new routing between SR 105 (modern SR 15) in Bangor and Brownville Junction, where it most likely dead-ended in the village. When the roadway was extended northeast to Millinocket, SR 11 was moved onto it and SR 221 was truncated to terminate at SR 11 (Upper Charleston Road) in Bradford. In 1980, SR 11 was rerouted to the south to bypass Charleston on West Road, then north along SR 221 (Main Road) to resume its existing alignment. The old alignment through Charleston became SR 11A. The northern terminus of SR 221 was not moved, resulting in a concurrency between SR 11 and SR 221 that existed until at least 2007. By 2011, new signage had been installed indicating that SR 221 was truncated to the intersection of West Road and East Road, eliminating the concurrency with SR 11.

== Major junctions ==
The entire route is in Penobscot County.

Location	mi	km	Destinations	Notes
Bangor	0.00	0.00	SR 15 (Broadway) – Bangor, Dover-Foxcroft	Southern terminus of SR 221
Hudson	10.26	16.51	SR 43 east (Old Town Road) – Old Town	Southern terminus of SR 43 concurrency
Hudson	12.56	20.21	SR 43 west (Corinth Road) – Corinth	Northern terminus of SR 43 concurrency
Bradford	15.94	25.65	SR 11 (West Road / Main Road) / SR 155 east (East Road) – Milo, Bradford Center	Northern terminus of SR 221, western terminus of SR 155.
1.000 mi = 1.609 km; 1.000 km = 0.621 mi: Concurrency terminus
