= Edinburg, Maine =

Town in Maine, United States

- Town
- Seal

- Location within Maine Location within the United States
- Coordinates: 45°10′05″N 68°41′27″W
- Country: United States
- State: Maine
- County: Penobscot

Area
  - Total: 35.01 sq mi (90.68 km^{2})
  - Land: 35.01 sq mi (90.68 km^{2})
  - Water: 0 sq mi (0 km^{2})
- Elevation: 223 ft (68 m)

Population (2020)
  - Total: 134
  - Density: 3.9/sq mi (1.5/km^{2})
- Time zone: UTC-5 (Eastern (EST))
  - Summer (DST): UTC-4 (EDT)
- ZIP Codes: 04448 (Howland); 04453 (LaGrange); 04468 (Old Town)
- Area code: 207
- FIPS code: 23-22710
- GNIS feature ID: 582463
- Website: edinburgmaine.org

Edinburg is a town in Penobscot County, Maine, United States. The population was 134 at the 2020 census. It is part of the Bangor Metropolitan Statistical Area. It is located between the towns of Argyle and Howland along Maine State Route 116 on the west bank of the Penobscot River.

== History ==
Edinburg was undoubtedly named for the Scottish city Edinburgh, and probably by Scotsman John Bennoch, an early settler of nearby Orono who built a road between that town and Medford, Maine, in 1826 which ran through what is now Edinburg. The town was incorporated in 1835, and by 1843 it had 52 residents, 23 of them children. By 1859 the population was 93.

Corp. Asbury F. Haynes of the 17th Maine Regiment, who was born in Edinburg in 1842, captured the Confederate battle flag at the Battle of Sayler's Creek in Virginia, April 6, 1865, an action which won him the Medal of Honor. He lived until 1931 and is buried at Lakeview Cemetery in Seattle, Washington.

== Geography ==
According to the United States Census Bureau, the town has a total area of 35.01 square miles (90.68 km^{2}), all land.

== Demographics ==
Historical population
Census	Pop.	Note	%±
1840	52		—
1850	93		78.8%
1860	48		−48.4%
1870	55		14.6%
1880	45		−18.2%
1890	54		20.0%
1900	65		20.4%
1910	45		−30.8%
1920	41		−8.9%
1930	45		9.8%
1940	34		−24.4%
1950	36		5.9%
1960	19		−47.2%
1970	67		252.6%
1980	126		88.1%
1990	107		−15.1%
2000	98		−8.4%
2010	131		33.7%
2020	134		2.3%
U.S. Decennial Census

=== 2010 census ===
As of the census of 2010, there were 131 people, 53 households, and 41 families living in the town. The population density was 3.7 inhabitants per square mile (1.4/km^{2}). There were 69 housing units at an average density of 2.0 per square mile (0.8/km^{2}). The racial makeup of the town was 99.2% White and 0.8% Native American.

There were 53 households, of which 24.5% had children under the age of 18 living with them, 64.2% were married couples living together, 3.8% had a female householder with no husband present, 9.4% had a male householder with no wife present, and 22.6% were non-families. 15.1% of all households were made up of individuals, and 7.6% had someone living alone who was 65 years of age or older. The average household size was 2.47 and the average family size was 2.76.

The median age in the town was 47.1 years. 19.8% of residents were under the age of 18; 5.4% were between the ages of 18 and 24; 22.1% were from 25 to 44; 35.9% were from 45 to 64; and 16.8% were 65 years of age or older. The gender makeup of the town was 49.6% male and 50.4% female.

=== 2000 census ===
As of the census of 2000, there were 98 people, 44 households, and 28 families living in the town. The population density was 2.8 inhabitants per square mile (1.1/km^{2}). There were 54 housing units at an average density of 1.5 per square mile (0.58/km^{2}). The racial makeup of the town was 96.94% White and 3.06% African American.

There were 44 households, out of which 15.9% had children under the age of 18 living with them, 59.1% were married couples living together, 6.8% had a female householder with no husband present, and 34.1% were non-families. 22.7% of all households were made up of individuals, and 6.8% had someone living alone who was 65 years of age or older. The average household size was 2.23 and the average family size was 2.69.

In the town, the population was spread out, with 15.3% under the age of 18, 5.1% from 18 to 24, 21.4% from 25 to 44, 45.9% from 45 to 64, and 12.2% who were 65 years of age or older. The median age was 48 years. For every 100 females, there were 92.2 males. For every 100 females age 18 and over, there were 102.4 males.

The median income for a household in the town was $52,083, and the median income for a family was $56,875. Males had a median income of $35,000 versus $21,250 for females. The per capita income for the town was $24,526. There were no families and 2.9% of the population living below the poverty line, including no under eighteens and none of those over 64.

== See also ==
- School Administrative Unit 31
