= Maxfield, Maine =

Town in Maine, United States

- Town
- Location within Maine Location within the United States
- Coordinates: 45°17′20″N 68°45′19″W
- Country: United States
- State: Maine
- County: Penobscot

Area
  - Total: 19.20 sq mi (49.73 km^{2})
  - Land: 18.93 sq mi (49.03 km^{2})
  - Water: 0.27 sq mi (0.70 km^{2})
- Elevation: 233 ft (71 m)

Population (2020)
  - Total: 89
  - Density: 4.7/sq mi (1.8/km^{2})
- Time zone: UTC-5 (Eastern (EST))
  - Summer (DST): UTC-4 (EDT)
- ZIP Codes: 04453 (LaGrange); 04448 (Howland)
- Area code: 207
- FIPS code: 23-44340
- GNIS feature ID: 582586

Maxfield is a town in Penobscot County, Maine, United States. The population was 89 at the 2020 census.

== Geography ==
Maxfield is situated along the Piscataquis River.

According to the United States Census Bureau, the town has a total area of 19.20 square miles (49.73 km^{2}), of which 18.93 square miles (49.03 km^{2}) is land and 0.27 square miles (0.70 km^{2}) is water.

== History ==
Maxfield was incorporated in 1824 from a portion of the Bridgton Academy Grant.

In the early 1890s, Maxfield was within the range of a giant (400 pound) wild black bear named "Old Ranger", who was eventually shot and killed by a local hunting party after a lifetime of raiding orchards, and having survived numerous other attempts to do him in. According to a New York Sun obituary of Old Ranger, "the whole of Penobscot County knew the bear, and he defied the entire population."

In December 2025, Maxfield town council voted in favor of dissolving the town into unorganized territory.

== Demographics ==
Historical population
Census	Pop.	Note	%±
1830	186		—
1840	185		−0.5%
1850	186		0.5%
1860	162		−12.9%
1870	156		−3.7%
1880	139		−10.9%
1890	134		−3.6%
1900	115		−14.2%
1910	79		−31.3%
1920	67		−15.2%
1930	116		73.1%
1940	67		−42.2%
1950	26		−61.2%
1960	39		50.0%
1970	24		−38.5%
1980	64		166.7%
1990	86		34.4%
2000	87		1.2%
2010	97		11.5%
2020	89		−8.2%
U.S. Decennial Census

=== 2010 census ===
As of the census of 2010, there were 97 people, 41 households, and 26 families living in the town. The population density was 5.1 inhabitants per square mile (2.0/km^{2}). There were 61 housing units at an average density of 3.2 per square mile (1.2/km^{2}). The racial makeup of the town was 91.8% White, 4.1% Native American, 1.0% Pacific Islander, and 3.1% from two or more races. Hispanic or Latino of any race were 1.0% of the population.

There were 41 households, of which 22.0% had children under the age of 18 living with them, 43.9% were married couples living together, 12.2% had a female householder with no husband present, 7.3% had a male householder with no wife present, and 36.6% were non-families. 29.3% of all households were made up of individuals, and 12.2% had someone living alone who was 65 years of age or older. The average household size was 2.37 and the average family size was 2.77.

The median age in the town was 40.5 years. 20.6% of residents were under the age of 18; 7.3% were between the ages of 18 and 24; 27.8% were from 25 to 44; 26.8% were from 45 to 64; and 17.5% were 65 years of age or older. The gender makeup of the town was 50.5% male and 49.5% female.

=== 2000 census ===
As of the census of 2000, there were 87 people, 39 households, and 23 families living in the town. The population density was 4.6 inhabitants per square mile (1.8/km^{2}). There were 52 housing units at an average density of 2.7 per square mile (1.0/km^{2}). The racial makeup of the town was 100.00% White.

There were 39 households, out of which 25.6% had children under the age of 18 living with them, 51.3% were married couples living together, 10.3% had a female householder with no husband present, and 38.5% were non-families. 25.6% of all households were made up of individuals, and 5.1% had someone living alone who was 65 years of age or older. The average household size was 2.23 and the average family size was 2.71.

In the town, the population was spread out, with 21.8% under the age of 18, 3.4% from 18 to 24, 28.7% from 25 to 44, 33.3% from 45 to 64, and 12.6% who were 65 years of age or older. The median age was 44 years. For every 100 females, there were 97.7 males. For every 100 females age 18 and over, there were 94.3 males.

== See also ==
- School Administrative Unit 31
