= Mary Perkins (nurse) =

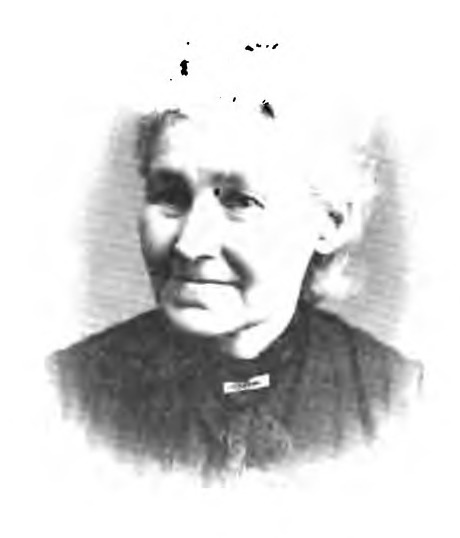
- Born: May 5, 1839; Brewer, Maine
- Died: November 18, 1893 (aged 54)
- Occupation: Nurse

Mary Perkins (May 5, 1839 – November 18, 1893) was a Union nurse during the American Civil War.

== Early life ==
Perkins was born on May 5, 1839, in Brewer, Maine. She later moved to Enfield, Maine until the outbreak of the Civil War.

== Civil War service ==
Perkins enlisted in 1861 as a nurse for the 11th Maine Volunteer Infantry. Shortly after, she accompanied the regiment to Washington, D.C., where she served at Brigade Hospital. In March 1862, the regiment moved, and Perkins then served at Hygeia Hospital. At this hospital, Perkins worked with Dorothea Dix throughout McClellan's Peninsula Campaign.

Perkins left the service when her brother was injured in the war.

== After the war ==
Perkins married Andrew Perkins in April 1850. She died on November 18, 1893.
