= Old Tavern =

Old Tavern may refer to:

- Old Tavern (Sacramento, California), listed on the National Register of Historic Places in Sacramento County, California
- Old Tavern (Burlington, Maine), listed on the National Register of Historic Places in Penobscot County, Maine
- Old Tavern Farm

== See also ==
- Ye Olde Tavern (disambiguation)
