= The Mitchell Block =

Building in Winnipeg, Canada

Mitchell Block
- Alternative names: Gillett Building Grange Building

General information
- Location: 173 McDermot Ave, Winnipeg, Manitoba R3B 0S1
- Country: Canada
- Coordinates: 49.897376°N 97.137309°W
- Completed: 1887
- Opened: June 1, 1887
- Cost: $7,000 CAD

Technical details
- Size: 26 by 80 feet (7.9 m × 24.4 m)
- Floor count: 3

Design and construction
- Architect(s): Arthur T. Timewall
- Main contractor: A.P. Cameron

Municipally Designated Site
- Official name: Grange Building
- Designation: Winnipeg Landmark Heritage Structure
- Recognized: July 15, 1985
- CRHP listing: October 24, 2006
- Recognition authority: City of Winnipeg
- ID: 6012

The Mitchell Block (also known as the Gillett Building or the Grange Building) is a three-storey structure at 173 McDermot Avenue in the Exchange District of Winnipeg, Manitoba, Canada. Built in 1886/87 for the W. J. Mitchell Drug Company, the first drug store in Winnipeg, it is now a municipally-designated historic site.

Designed by architect Arthur T. Timewall, the building includes a mortar and pestle above the doorway, and an ornamental scroll was engraved along the roofline, which gave it a distinction among the other buildings at the time it was constructed.

Today, the building houses an Italian bistro called Borgo Antico.

== History ==
=== W. J. Mitchell Drug Company ===
W. J. Mitchell Drug Company was the first drug store in Winnipeg and the original tenant of the building located at 173 McDermot Avenue.

The company was founded in 1875 by Trolt and Melville, and was joined by William James Mitchell (September 12, 1843 – October 29, 1907) in 1880. Mitchell became its sole proprietor 3 years later, whereupon the store was named the W. J. Mitchell Drug Company. Built between 1886 and 1887 and opened on 1 June 1998, the current-day structure at 173 McDermot Avenue was constructed for Mitchell's company to be a wholesale distributor, It was completely modern for its time, having hot and cold running water and steam heat, was described as one of the most handsome buildings in the country at the time.

The Mitchell Drug Company sold its products across the prairies and was the only wholesale chemist based in the northwest. Mitchell's most popular products were cough syrup (wild cherry and spruce gum) and camphorated eye water, as well as such patent products as Mitchell's Botanic Bitters, Mitchell's Liver Pills, Mitchell's Carbolic Cerate, Urquhart's Worm Specific, Prairie Pain Relief, and Prairie Condition Powders. The second floor of the building was known as the "wet and dry department" and was where the laboratory would mix the preparations; the third floor was reserved for the glass bottles and tinctures; and the basement was where the chemicals were kept.

=== 1910–present ===
In 1910, the building was renamed the Gillett Building, as it was purchased by the American manufacturing firm of E. W. Gillett Company, which sold baking products made at their factory in Toronto, Ontario. During the 1930s, it became known as the Grange Building after its primary occupant, the Grange Stationery Company.

After various occupants, the building housed an Italian bistro called Tre Visi and Sensi Wine Lounge until 2013, after which it became was home to The Mitchell Block, another Italian bistro for 10 years and is currently home to Borgo Antico.
