= Concord Haven =

Historic house in Maine, United States

- U.S. National Register of Historic Places
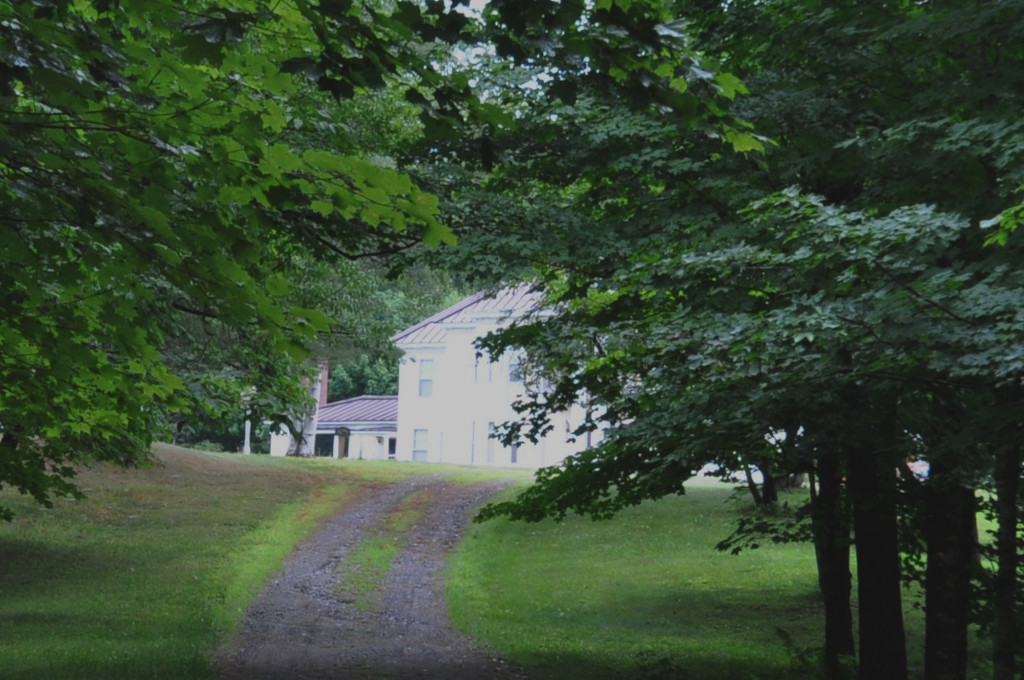

- Location within Maine Location within the United States
- Location: 1405 SR16, Embden, Maine
- Coordinates: 44.977°N 69.878°W
- Area: 50 acres (20 ha)
- Built: 1915
- Architect: John Calvin Stevens and John Howard Stevens
- Architectural style: Colonial Revival
- NRHP reference No.: 92001297
- Added to NRHP: October 2, 1992

Concord Haven, or the J. Leon Williams House, is a historic summer estate in Embden, Maine. Built in 1915, the house is a fine local example of Colonial Revival architecture, and is one of the only architect-designed buildings in the rural community. It was designed by John Calvin Stevens and John Howard Stevens for local son James Leon Williams, noted for his advances in dentistry. The house was listed on the National Register of Historic Places in 1992.

== Description and history ==
Concord Haven is located on 50 acres (20 ha) of mixed forest and agricultural land in northern Embden, just on the border with Concord Township. The house is set between Maine State Route 16 and the Kennebec River, with a commanding view of the latter. The main block is a rectangular wood-frame structure, oriented with the long axis north–south, with a hip roof topped by a widow's walk with balustrade. A two-story wing extends to the left (north), with a single-story wing extending further from that. A long single-story sunroom addition extends to the south. The west-facing facade is dominated by a two-story portico supported by paired Tuscan columns, under which is the main entrance, topped by a semi-elliptical fanlight window, and a second-floor veranda. This central portico is flanked on the first floor by picture windows with small side windows, and by paired sash windows on the second. The east (river-facing) facade has a broad veranda extending the width of the main block, and a two-story portico supported by fluted square columns, under which is a sitting area on the second level.

James Leon Williams was born in Embden (in a farmhouse across Route 16 from this house) and trained as a dentist. Instead of practicing the craft, he engaged in research, furthering the understanding of the formation of dental enamel and the effects of bacteria on it. He also innovated in the production of dental prosthetics, and wrote many papers on dentistry-related subjects. Williams hired the noted Portland-based firm of John Calvin Stevens, then in partnership with his son John Howard Stevens to design his summer house. The house was, at the time of its listing on the National Register in 1992, the only major architect-designed building in Embden.

== See also ==
- National Register of Historic Places listings in Somerset County, Maine
