= John Howard Stevens =

American architect

- Born: February 23, 1879; Portland, Maine, U.S.
- Died: January 1, 1958 (aged 78); Portland, Maine, U.S.
- Occupation: Architect
- Parent(s): John Calvin Stevens; Martha Louise Waldron

John Howard Stevens (February 23, 1879 – February 1, 1958) was an American architect who worked in the Shingle style and the Colonial Revival style.

== Early life ==
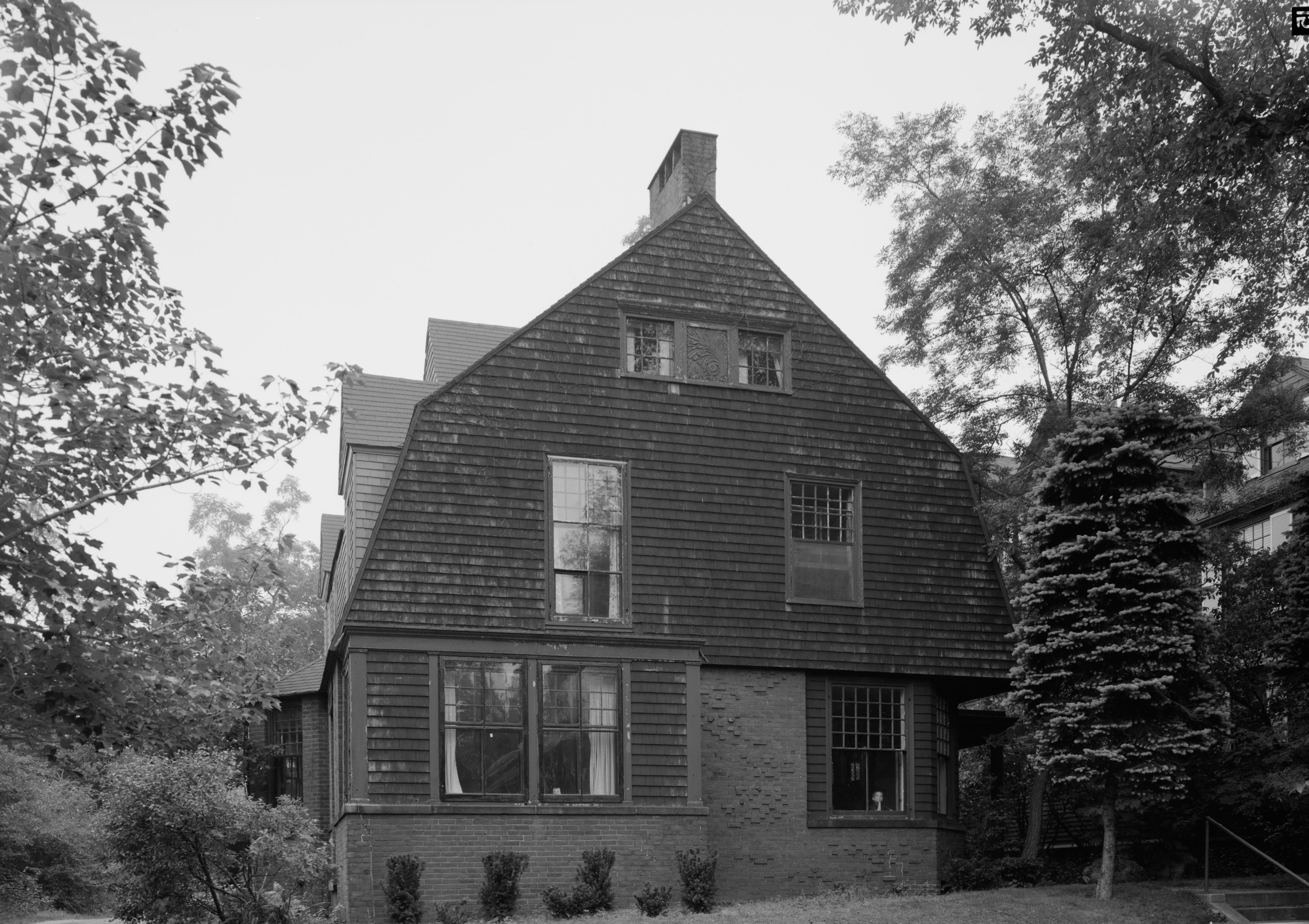
52 Bowdoin Street, today known as the John Calvins Stevens House, where John Howard grew up

Stevens was born in Portland, Maine, in 1879, the oldest child of John Calvin Stevens, a noted architect, and Martha Louise Waldron. From the age of five, he lived with his family at 52 Bowdoin Street in Portland's West End.

He was educated in the Portland schools.

== Career ==
Stevens began his career as a draftsman, and worked in his father's architectural firm from 1898. They became partners in 1904, under the name Stevens Architects, a business which lasted until his father's death in 1940. Stevens' son, John Calvin II, had joined the practice seven years earlier. The duo went into partnership with James Cooper Saunders in 1953.

In 1909, Stevens and his father assisted Carrère and Hastings in designing today's Portland City Hall.

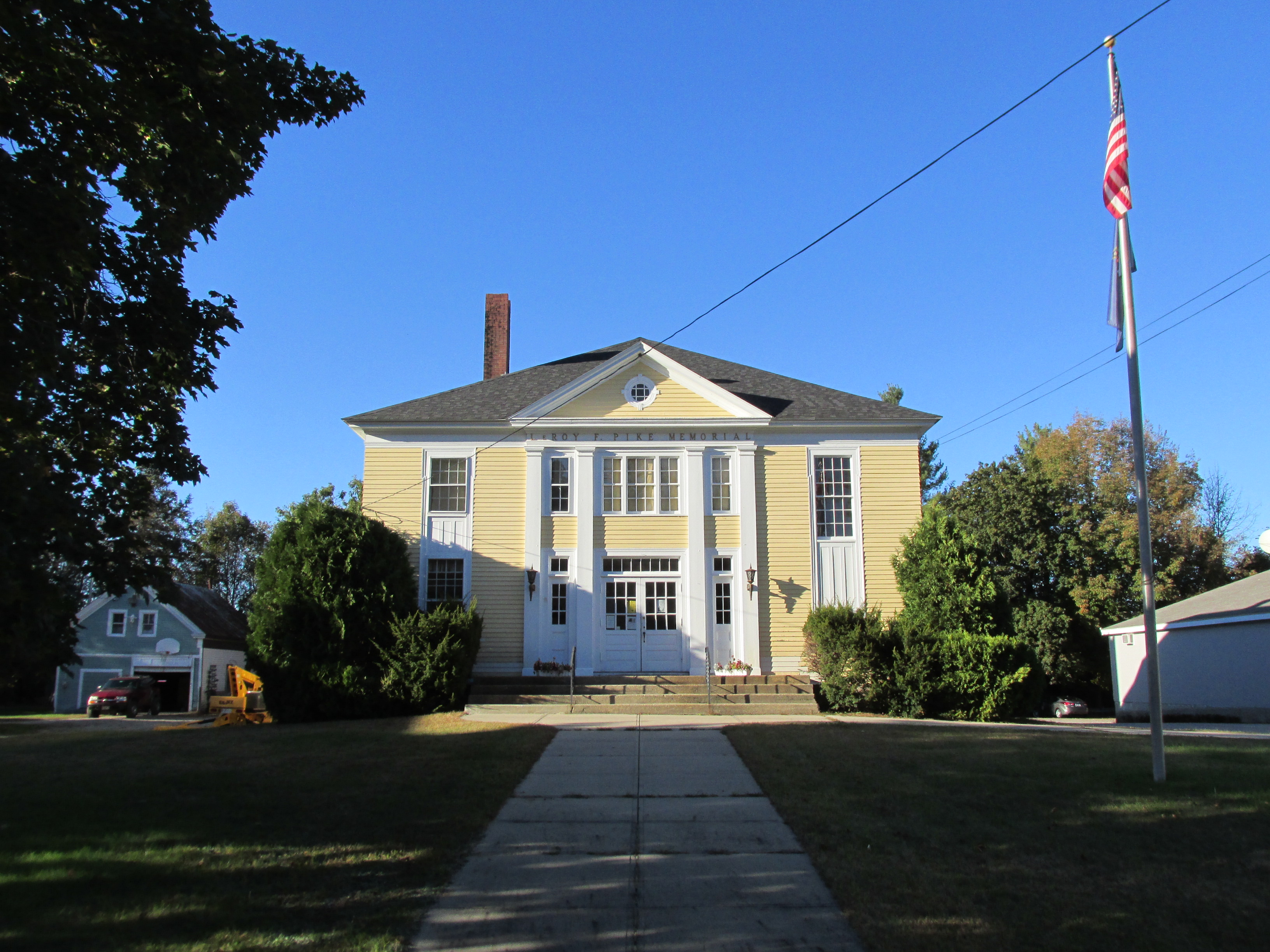
LeRoy F. Pike Memorial Building, Cornish, Maine, built in 1925

=== Notable works ===
- Nathan Clifford School, Portland, Maine (1907)
- Public Library, Limington, Maine (1912)
- Homes comprising the Norton House Historic District, Falmouth, Maine (1913)
- John B. Curtis Free Public Library, Bradford, Maine (1915)
- Concord Haven, Embden, Maine (1915)
- The Birches, Belgrade Lakes, Maine (1916)
- LeRoy F. Pike Memorial Building, Cornish, Maine (1925)
- Schlotterbeck and Foss Building, Portland, Maine (1927)
- Portland Water District Building, Portland, Maine (1928)
- U.S. Post Office-Portland Maine, Portland, Maine (1932)
- Deering Estate Barn, Portland, Maine (remodel; 1947)

== Personal life ==
Stevens married Agnes McFadden in 1903, with whom he had three children: Mary Caroline, John Calvin II and Howard Winchester. Mary died in infancy; John and Howard lived into their 80s.

He served as secretary and treasurer of the Maine chapter of the American Institute of Architects between 1934 and 1940, and as its president between 1940 and 1946.

Like his father, Stevens was a painter who specialized in watercolors.

== Death ==
Stevens died in 1958, aged 78. He was interred in Portland's Evergreen Cemetery, the same burial site of his parents. His wife was buried beside him upon her death fifteen months later.
