= Old Tavern (Burlington, Maine) =

- U.S. National Register of Historic Places
- Location within Maine Location within the United States
- Location: ME 188 and Long Ridge Rd., Burlington, Maine
- Coordinates: 45°12′32″N 68°25′30″W
- Area: 0.5 acres (0.20 ha)
- Built: 1844
- NRHP reference No.: 86000674
- Added to NRHP: April 4, 1986

The Old Tavern is a historic travelers' accommodation at Maine State Route 188 and Long Ridge Road in Burlington, Maine. Built in 1844, it predominantly catered to the lumbermen working on logging drives in the region. The building was acquired by the local historical society in 1984, and is now a local history museum. It was listed on the National Register of Historic Places in 1986.

== Description and history ==
The Old Tavern is located at the southeast corner of the fourway intersection of State Route 188, Long Ridge Road, and Hayden Lane, just north of the rural center of Burlington. The area is still quite rural, set north of the Passadumkeag River, which flows west toward the Penobscot River. The tavern is a 2 1/2-story wood-frame structure, five bays wide, with a side-gable roof, twin end chimneys, and clapboard siding. It is oriented facing west toward the southern leg of Route 188. A hip-roof porch extends across its front facade, supported by turned posts with decorative brackets. The main entrance, a 20th-century replacement, is flanked by sidelight windows and pilasters.

The tavern was built in 1844 by Amzi Libby, a native of Limerick, Maine, and primarily served lumbermen working further up the Passadumkeag River in the Nicatous Lake area. Jeremiah Page, its second owner, was prominent in local civic affairs, serving as selectman, town clerk, and justice of the peace. After the logging drives ended the tavern became a stopping point for sport hunters and fishermen. The building was acquired in 1984 by the Stewart M. Lord Memorial Historical Society, which has restored the building and uses it as a local history museum. Among the items on display is the tavern's guest log.

== See also ==
- National Register of Historic Places listings in Penobscot County, Maine
