= The Birches (Belgrade Lakes, Maine) =

Historic house in Maine, United States

- U.S. National Register of Historic Places
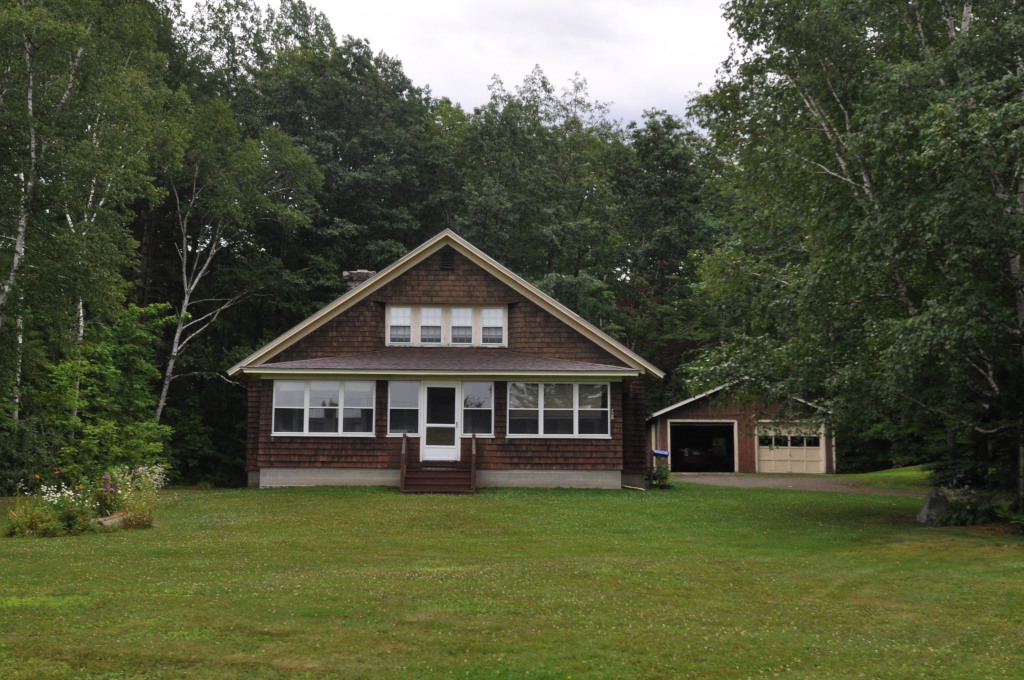

- Location within Maine Location within the United States
- Location: Off E side of Foster Ln., .15 mi. S of jct. with ME 27, Belgrade Lakes, Maine
- Coordinates: 44°31′22″N 69°53′14″W
- Built: 1916
- Architect: Stevens, John Calvin; Stevens, John Howard
- Architectural style: Bungalow/Craftsman
- NRHP reference No.: 96001036
- Added to NRHP: September 27, 1996

The Birches is a historic house on Foster Lane in Belgrade Lakes, Maine. Built in 1916 to a design by John Calvin Stevens and John Howard Stevens, it is the best-preserved surviving structure related to The Belgrade Hotel, a large summer resort hotel which burned down in 1955. It was listed on the National Register of Historic Places in 1996.

== Description and history ==
The Birches stands on the east side of Foster Lane, a short way south of its northern end at Lakeshore Drive, and about 0.15 miles (0.24 km) south of that road's junction with Maine State Route 27. It is a rectangular 1 1/2-story wood-frame structure, with a gabled roof and shingled exterior. Its main facade faces northwest, with an enclosed single-story hip-roofed porch extending across its width. The southwest roof face is adorned with an eyebrow dormer, and a fieldstone chimney rises through the northeast roof face. The interior has a large two-story living room, finished entirely in original varnished tongue-and-groove woodwork. A balcony runs around all four sides, with a stair rising along the wall dividing the room from bedrooms and bathrooms.

The house was built in 1916, as a satellite cottage to The Belgrade Hotel, built in 1899 and twice enlarged, all to designs by the noted Portland architect John Calvin Stevens. The cottage is one of four built, and was probably designed by Stevens in conjunction with his son, John Howard Stevens. The hotel burned down in 1955, and this cottage is the best-preserved of the three that survive. It was sold as a separate property after the fire, and was used as a summer cottage until 1994, when it was weatherized for year-round occupancy.

== See also ==
- National Register of Historic Places listings in Kennebec County, Maine
