= Ye Olde Tavern =

Ye Olde Tavern may refer to:

- Ye Olde Tavern, Kington, a pub in Herefordshire, England
- Ye Olde Tavern (Iowa), a former restaurant in the United States
- Ye Olde Tavern, Vermont, a restaurant in the United States

== See also ==
- Old Tavern (disambiguation)
