= Norton House Historic District =

Historic district in Maine, United States

- U.S. National Register of Historic Places
- U.S. Historic district
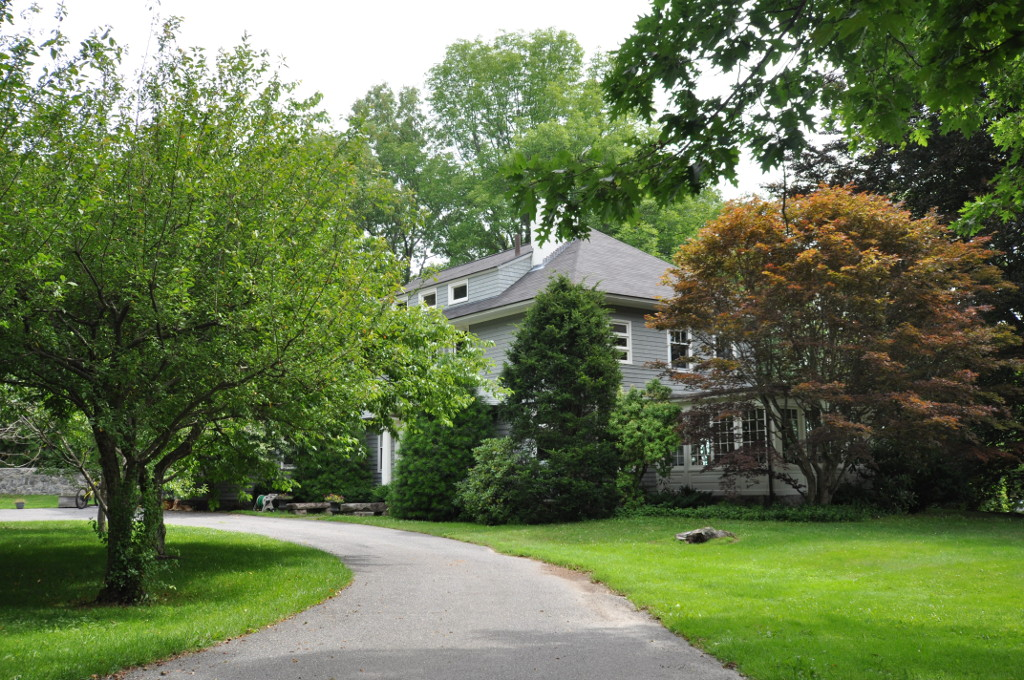
- The main house

- Location within Maine Location within the United States
- Location: 241 and 243 Foreside Rd., Falmouth, Maine
- Coordinates: 43°43′54″N 70°12′36″W
- Area: 2.5 acres (1.0 ha)
- Built: 1912
- Architect: Stevens, John Calvin; Parker, Carl Rust, et al.
- Architectural style: Prairie School, Shingle Style, et al.
- NRHP reference No.: 03001501
- Added to NRHP: January 28, 2004

The Norton House Historic District encompasses two properties that formerly constituted the central portion of a suburban country estate in Falmouth, Maine. Located on Foreside Road, overlooking Casco Bay, the landscaped properties include a house and former carriage house designed by John Calvin Stevens and John Howard Stevens in 1912. The district was listed on the National Register of Historic Places in 2004.

== Description and history ==
Until the early 20th century, the area known as Falmouth Foreside was a predominantly rural and agricultural area. By 1910 a full-scale conversion of the area to coastal estate homes was well underway, with landowners selling off coastal properties for development. The family of Ralph S. Norton, an insurance executive based in Portland, owned a small farm in the area, and Norton decided in 1911 to build a more substantial summer house on a high point overlooking Casco Bay. He retained John Howard Stevens, who developed a plan that included a house, carriage barn, and landscaped garden terraces. It is surmised that Carl Rust Parker, a prominent Portland landscape architect, was involved in the design of the grounds. The Norton estate was originally several hundred acres, most of which has since been subdivided (including the property of the Portland Yacht Club). Ownership of the house and barn was divided in 1967, after which the barn was converted to a residence.

The surviving Norton estate properties are accessed via private drive on the southeast side of Foreside Road (Maine State Route 88), between Old Powerhouse Road, which provides access to the yacht club, and Ramsdell Road. The drive is marked by a low stone wall with posts, and a small gatehouse on the right side, designed by John Howard Stevens. The main house is at the left side of the end of the drive, while the carriage barn is to the right. The house is a handsome 2-1/2 story structure, with an eclectic blend of Prairie School, Shingle, and Colonial Revival styles. Its interior finish is predominantly in Arts and Crafts styling that was fashionable at the time of its construction. The house's original view to the bay is now obscured by a house built on a subdivision of the estate.

== See also ==
- National Register of Historic Places listings in Cumberland County, Maine
