= LeRoy F. Pike Memorial Building =

- U.S. National Register of Historic Places
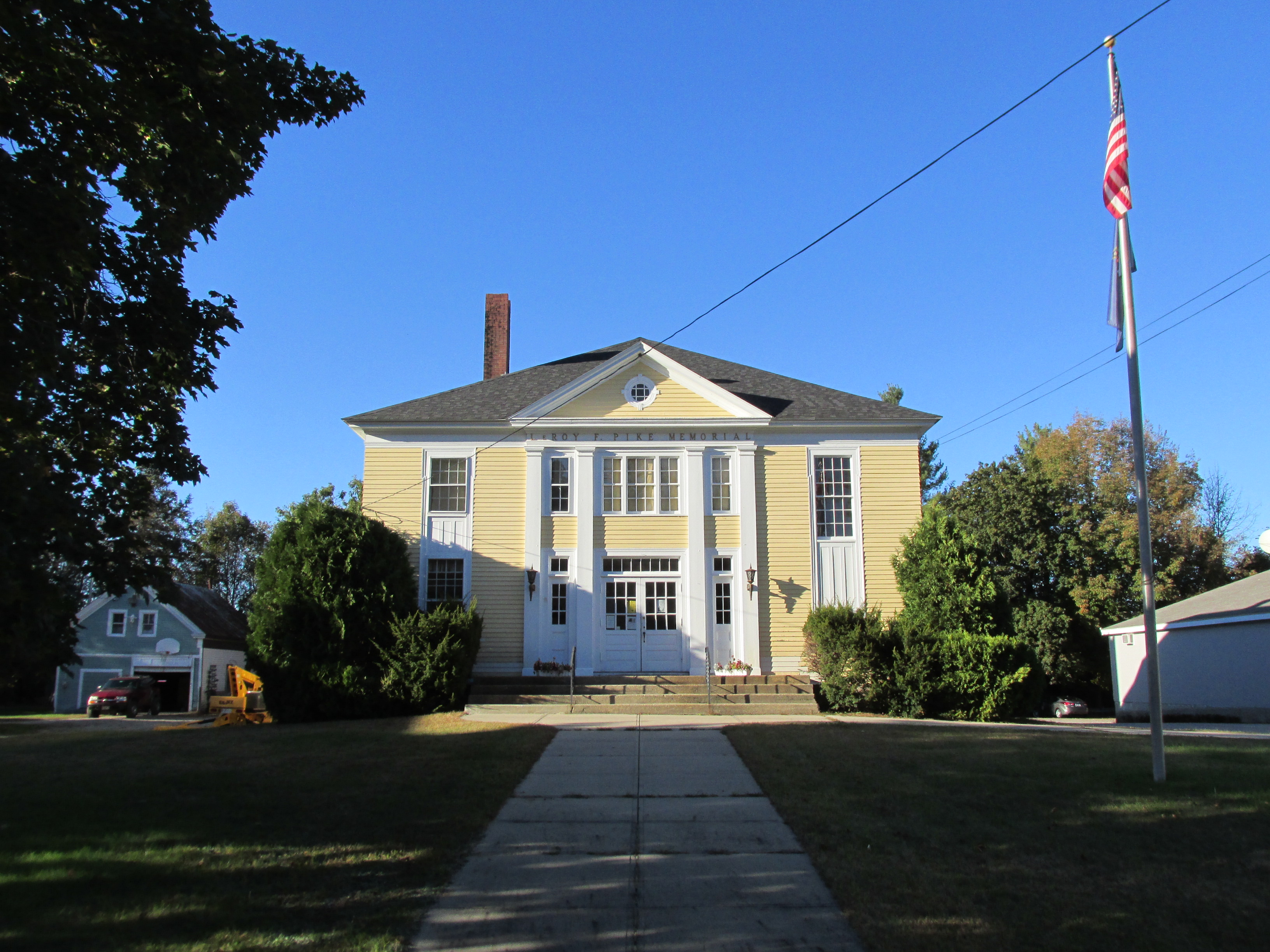

- Location within Maine Location within the United States
- Location: 17 Maple St., Cornish, Maine
- Coordinates: 43°48′21″N 70°48′22″W
- Area: 0.7 acres (0.28 ha)
- Built: 1925; 101 years ago
- Architect: John Calvin Stevens; John Howard Stevens
- Architectural style: Colonial Revival
- NRHP reference No.: 07000010
- Added to NRHP: February 7, 2007

The LeRoy F. Pike Memorial Building is the town hall of Cornish, Maine. It is located at 17 Maple Street (Maine State Route 25). It was built in 1925-26 to a design by John Calvin Stevens and John Howard Stevens, with funds willed to the town by the widow of LeRoy F. Pike, a local businessman and politician. The building was listed on the National Register of Historic Places in 2007.

== Description and history ==
The Pike Memorial Building is located in the main village of Cornish, a rural town in northern York County, Maine. It is set on the north side of Maple Street, the major east-west route through the village, just west of its central area. It is set back from the road, with a grassy front yard that has a concrete walk leading to a flight of low steps providing access to the building. It is a two-story wood frame structure, set on a high concrete foundation, with a high-pitched hip roof. The central portion of the front (south-facing) facade is demarcated by a gable in the roof, and four pilasters, two on either side of the double-door entrance. Between each pair of pilasters are narrow windows on the first and second level, and there is a three-part window above the entrance. Sash windows flank this entrance section on either side, with wooden panels separating the windows on the first and second floors. The building houses town offices and a large auditorium space.

LeRoy F. Pike was a Cornish native, lumberman, and local politician who served for many years in a variety of civic roles, including as town selectman, moderator, and constable. He died in 1915, and his widow, who died in 1922, willed to the town about $20,000 for the construction of a municipal building. The town retained Portland architect John Calvin Stevens and his son John Howard Stevens to design this Colonial Revival structure, which was completed in 1926. The building, in addition to housing town offices, has been used since then for municipal elections, and its auditorium has been used for all types of civic and private events.

== See also ==
- National Register of Historic Places listings in York County, Maine
