= Abiather J. Knowles =

Medal of Honor recipient (1830–1905)

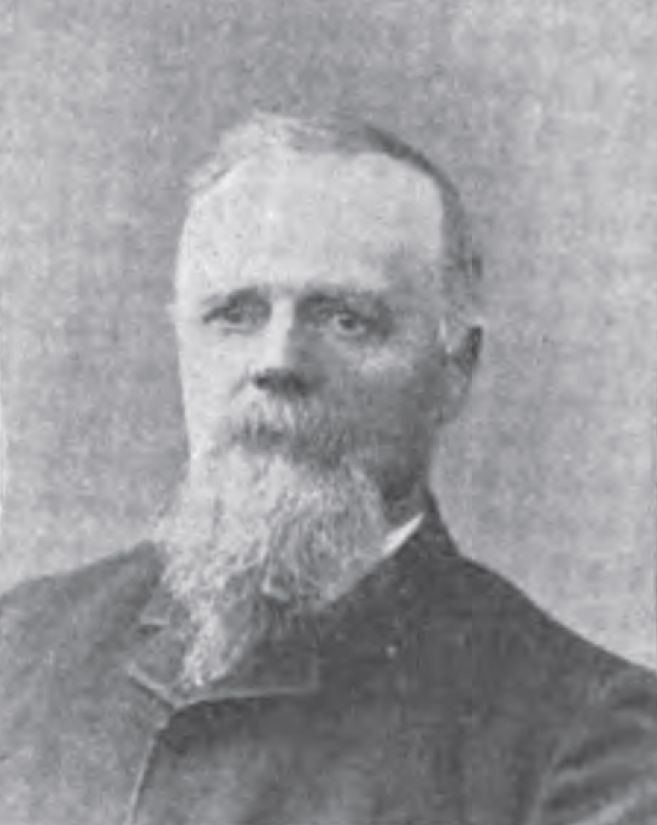
- Born: March 15, 1830; La Grange, Maine
- Died: February 11, 1905 (aged 74)
- Burial place: La Grange, Maine
- Military career
- Allegiance: United States of America
- Branch: United States Army
- Rank: Private
- Units: Company D, 2nd Maine Infantry
- Conflicts: American Civil War; First Battle of Bull Run
- Awards: Medal of Honor

Abiather J. Knowles (March 15, 1830 – February 11, 1905) was an American soldier who fought in the American Civil War. Knowles received his country's highest award for bravery during combat, the Medal of Honor. Knowles's medal was won for his actions during the First Battle of Bull Run in Prince William County, Virginia on July 21, 1861. He was honored with the award on December 27, 1894.

Knowles was from La Grange, Maine, and entered service at Willets Point in New York. He was later buried in La Grange.

== Medal of Honor citation ==
The President of the United States of America, in the name of Congress, takes pleasure in presenting the Medal of Honor to Private Abiather J. Knowles, United States Army, for extraordinary heroism on 21 July 1861, while serving with Company D, 2d Maine Infantry, in action at Bull Run, Virginia. Private Knowles removed dead and wounded under heavy fire.

== See also ==
- List of American Civil War Medal of Honor recipients: G–L
