= Deering Estate Barn =

- U.S. National Register of Historic Places
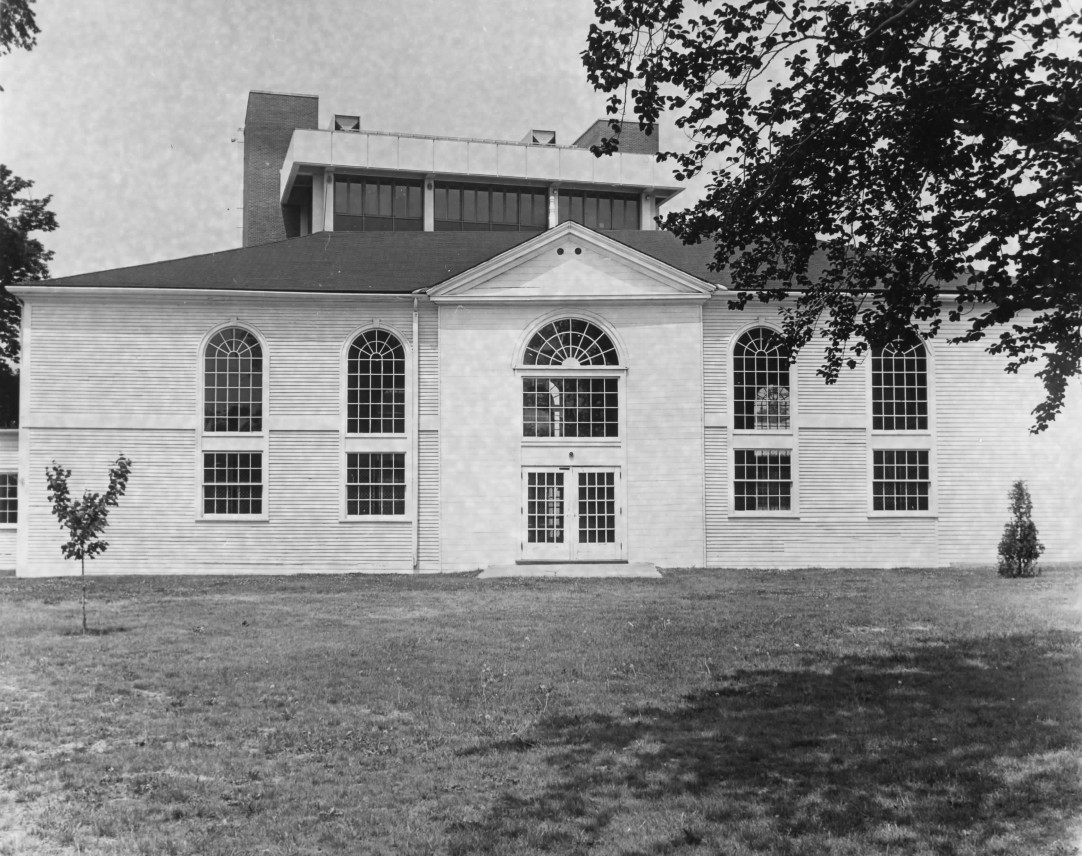
- The barn in 1969

- Location within Maine Location within the United States
- Location: Falmouth St., University of Southern Maine Portland Campus, Portland, Maine
- Coordinates: 43°39′49″N 70°16′40″W
- Area: less than one acre
- Built: 1805
- Architect: Alexander Parris; John Howard Stevens
- Architectural style: carriage barn
- NRHP reference No.: 09000089
- Added to NRHP: August 13, 1969

The Deering Estate Barn was an architecturally significant building on the campus of the University of Maine at Portland, now the University of Southern Maine (USM), in Portland, Maine. Built about 1805 (along with a mansion) to a design by Alexander Parris, it was remodeled to plans by John Howard Stevens when the estate was taken over by Portland Junior College in 1947. It was listed on the National Register of Historic Places in August 1969, and demolished that same month over the protests of the university community.

== History ==
James Deering (1766–1850) was a prominent Portland businessman who in 1802 acquired what was then called the Back Cove Farm, a large tract of land at the southern end of Back Cove, a tidal body of water on the west side of the Portland peninsula. Deering retained architect Alexander Parris, then at the start of his career, to design a gentleman's country estate on the property. Parris designed a mansion and carriage barn as part of this work, both of which survived into the mid-20th century. The Deering estate remained largely intact, except for development pressures on its southern extent, until 1879. Deering's heirs in that year sold off a large part of the estate to the city, on which Deering Oaks was established. The remained of the estate was eventually further subdivided, until 1946, when the surviving core (about 6 acres (2.4 ha)) was sold to Portland Junior College.

The mansion house was by then in sufficiently dilapidated condition that it was torn down. The college retained John Calvin Stevens II to design alterations to the carriage barn, which became a centerpiece of the campus. It was given a handsome Colonial Revival facade, with tall round-arched windows, and housed a combination gymnasium and assembly hall, along with a snack bar and lounge. The building was used as a social, performance, and athletic venue, hosting events such as campus socials and intramural basketball games.

In 1957, Portland Junior College merged with the University of Maine to form the University of Maine in Portland, which later merged with Gorham State Teachers College to form what is now the University of Southern Maine. The university began a series of modernizations of the campus in the 1960s, tearing down World War II surplus buildings and building new facilities. The old barn was deemed an eyesore by the university administration and was torn down in August 1969 over the protests of preservationists and sit-in campus activists, who were removed by court order to allow the demolition to proceed.

== See also ==
- National Register of Historic Places listings in Portland, Maine
