= Maine State Route 188 =

State highway in Penobscot County, Maine, US

State Route 188

Route information
- Maintained by MaineDOT
- Length: 12.99 mi (20.91 km)

Major junctions
- West end: SR 155 in Enfield
- East end: Grand Falls Road in Burlington

Location
- Country: United States
- State: Maine
- Counties: Penobscot

Highway system
- Maine State Highway System; Interstate; US; State; Auto trails; Lettered highways
← SR 187	→ SR 189

State Route 188 (SR 188) is part of Maine's system of numbered state highways, located in Penobscot County. It runs through three towns for the entire length: Enfield, Lowell, and Burlington. The route's western terminus is at SR 155 in Enfield. The route's eastern terminus is in southern Burlington near Saponac Pond where the road continues into the unorganized territory of East Central Penobscot as Grand Falls Road.

== Major junctions ==
The entire route is in Penobscot County.

Location	mi	km	Destinations	Notes
Enfield	0.00	0.00	SR 155 (Hammett Road / Enfield Road) – Lincoln, West Enfield	
Burlington–East Central Penobscot line	12.99	20.91	Grand Falls Road	
1.000 mi = 1.609 km; 1.000 km = 0.621 mi
