= School Administrative Unit 31 =

School district in Penobscot County, Maine, United States

Location
- Maine; United States
- Coordinates: 45.24616°N 68.66202°W

District information
- Motto: Achievement, Responsibility, Compassion
- Superintendent: Michael Wright
- Schools: Penobscot Valley High School; Hichborn Middle School; Enfield Station School

School Administrative Unit 31, or SAU 31, is a school district that serves the towns of Lowell, Burlington, Edinburg, Enfield, Howland, Maxfield, and Passadumkeag, in the U.S. state of Maine. Three schools are managed in the school district, which enroll a total of 652 students. Currently, the three schools are in two separate buildings. ESS, the elementary school, is located in West Enfield, while the other two schools are located in Howland. The district's total revenue is $7,708,000. The district's total revenue per student is $11,823.

== Penobscot Valley High School ==
Penobscot Valley High School (PVHS) is a 9–12 school serving approximately 157 students in Howland. It employs approximately 28 teachers. PVHS is the only 9-12 school in SAD 31.

== Hichborn Middle School ==
Hichborn Middle School (HMS) was constructed in 1971. It currently serves 152 students in the area grades 6-8. 50% of students are qualified to receive free or reduced lunch.

In the summer of 2007, the school underwent a minor renovation, along with the high school. The teachers' bathrooms were transformed into one handicap-eccessible restroom. Some doorways were redone, and the locker room doors were moved. There are plans to renovate the outdated restrooms and locker rooms, which have not been updated since the school's construction in 1971.

HMS houses the Jim Currie Library Media Center, which serves the middle and high school. The middle school has a small gymnasium, commonly referred to as the multi-purpose room.

== Enfield Station School ==
"Sited on what was the former Cole Farm, in Enfield, Maine, on land donated by the family of Galen Cole, the Enfield Station School building opened to students in January 1993.

Three district elementary schools (Ring Street in Howland, Curtis School in West Enfield, and the Burlington School in Burlington) closed and all students moved to the new school. Opening with 400 students, the school currently serves a little over 300 students in grades kindergarten through five. Each grade has three classes, with the exception of third grade that has two (classes)."

== Budget problems ==
On August 24, 2011, new district Superintendent Michael Wright unveiled a public letter indicating that the school had a $1.2 million deficit. This led to severe austerity, including the guideline that all new purchases must be made through him, and layoffs of ed. techs and teachers.
