= Pushaw Lake =

Lake in Maine, United States

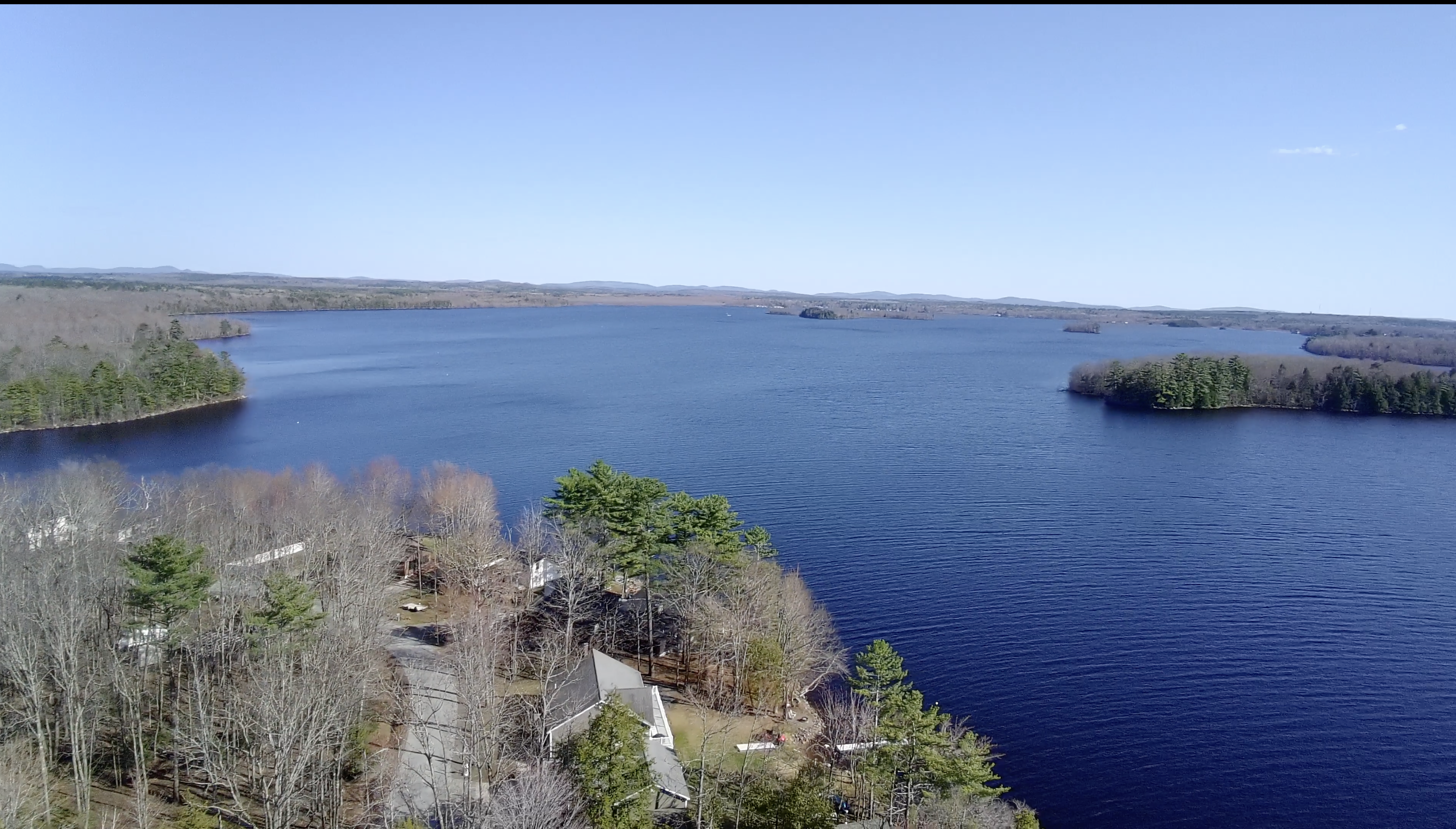

- Location within Maine Location within the United States
- Location: Penobscot County, Maine
- Coordinates: 44°56′15″N 68°48′00″W
- Primary inflows: Pushaw Stream and others
- Primary outflows: Pushaw Stream to Penobscot River
- Basin countries: United States
- Max. length: 7.6 mi (12.2 km)
- Max. width: 2.3 mi (3.7 km)
- Surface area: 4,680 acres (1,890 ha)
- Average depth: 11 ft (3.4 m)
- Max. depth: 33 ft (10 m)
- Water volume: 53,102 acre⋅ft (65,500,000 m^{3})
- Surface elevation: 115 ft (35 m)
- Islands: 14+

Pushaw Lake is a shallow, warmwater lake in Penobscot County, Maine, United States about 6.5 mi (10.5 km) north of Bangor and 4.5 mi (7.2 km) west of Orono.

The lake is part of the towns of Orono, Old Town, Hudson, and Glenburn. There are roads and private residences along much of the lake, except the southeastern end where the Caribou Bog complex borders the lake.

Due to its relative proximity to the city of Bangor, the lake is popular for recreational activities. Three public sites provide launch access for boats and winter vehicles alike, but parking is often limited for nonresidents.

Fishing is a popular activity in Pushaw Lake, especially following the introductions of Largemouth Bass and Northern Pike in the Early 2000’s. The lake also boasts healthy native populations of Smallmouth Bass and White Perch. It is one of the northernmost bodies of water in Maine where largemouth and pike are present in abundance.

A small dam was constructed in 1920 at the lake's outflow to maintain constant water levels. The lake's formation and history prior to 1920 remains unclear. The formation of Pushaw Lake was likely caused by glacial melting, however, some locals believe that the lake was greatly expanded in size by flooding or man-made causes at some point in history, explaining the lake's shallow depth.

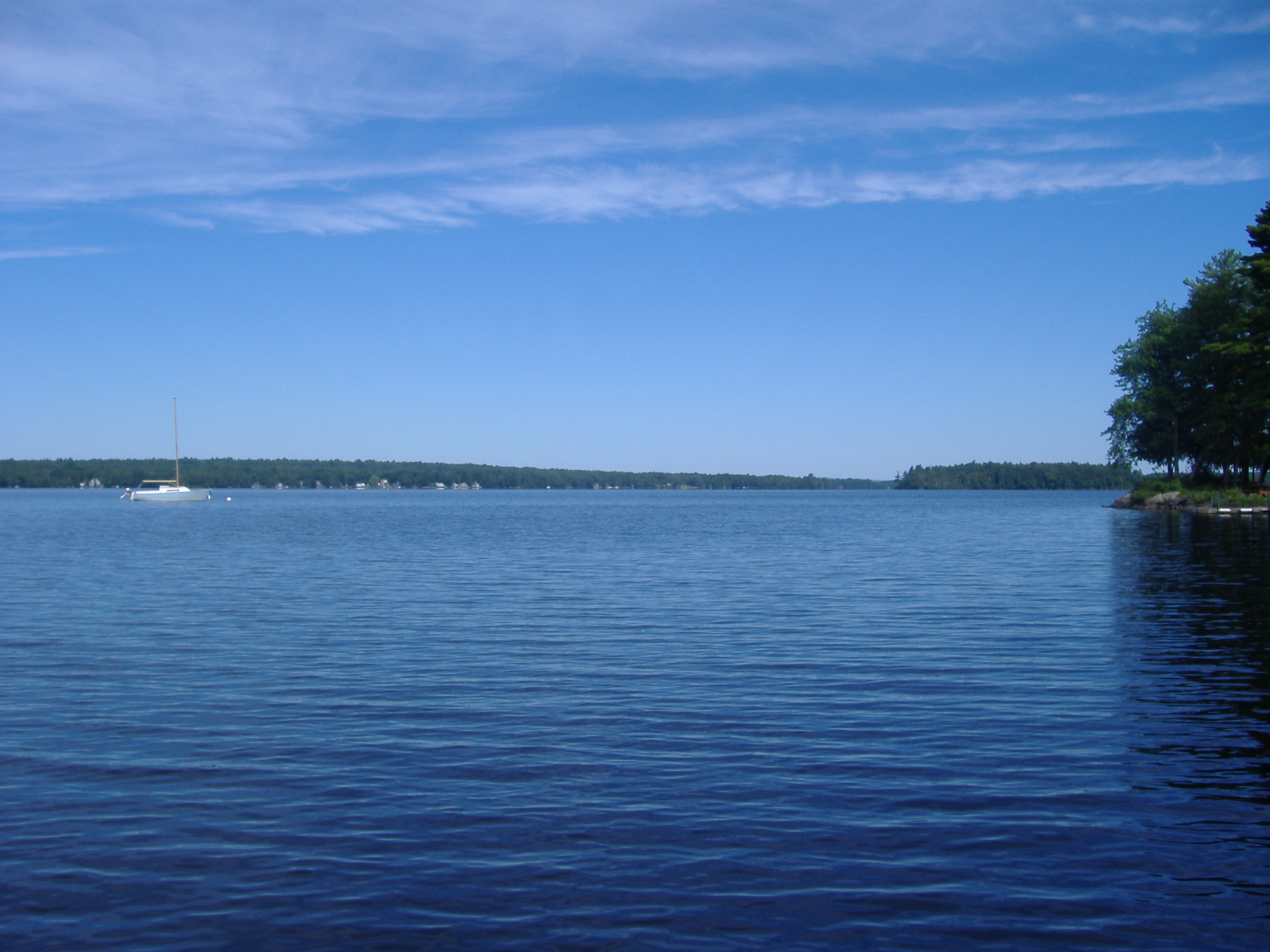
Pushaw Lake, Maine.

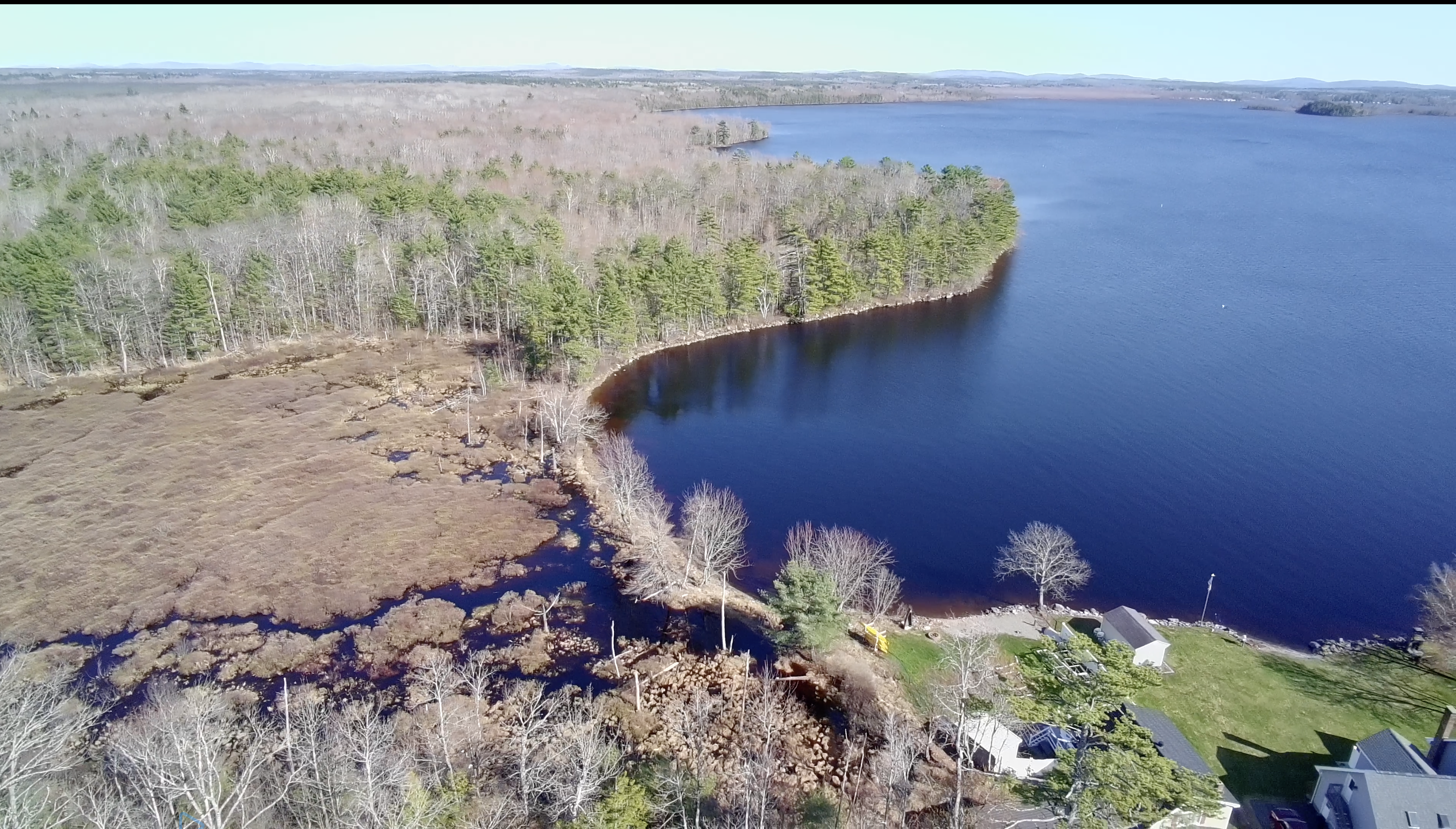
Caribou Bog Complex and Pushaw Lake, Old Town, Maine
