= Schlotterbeck and Foss Building =

- U.S. National Register of Historic Places
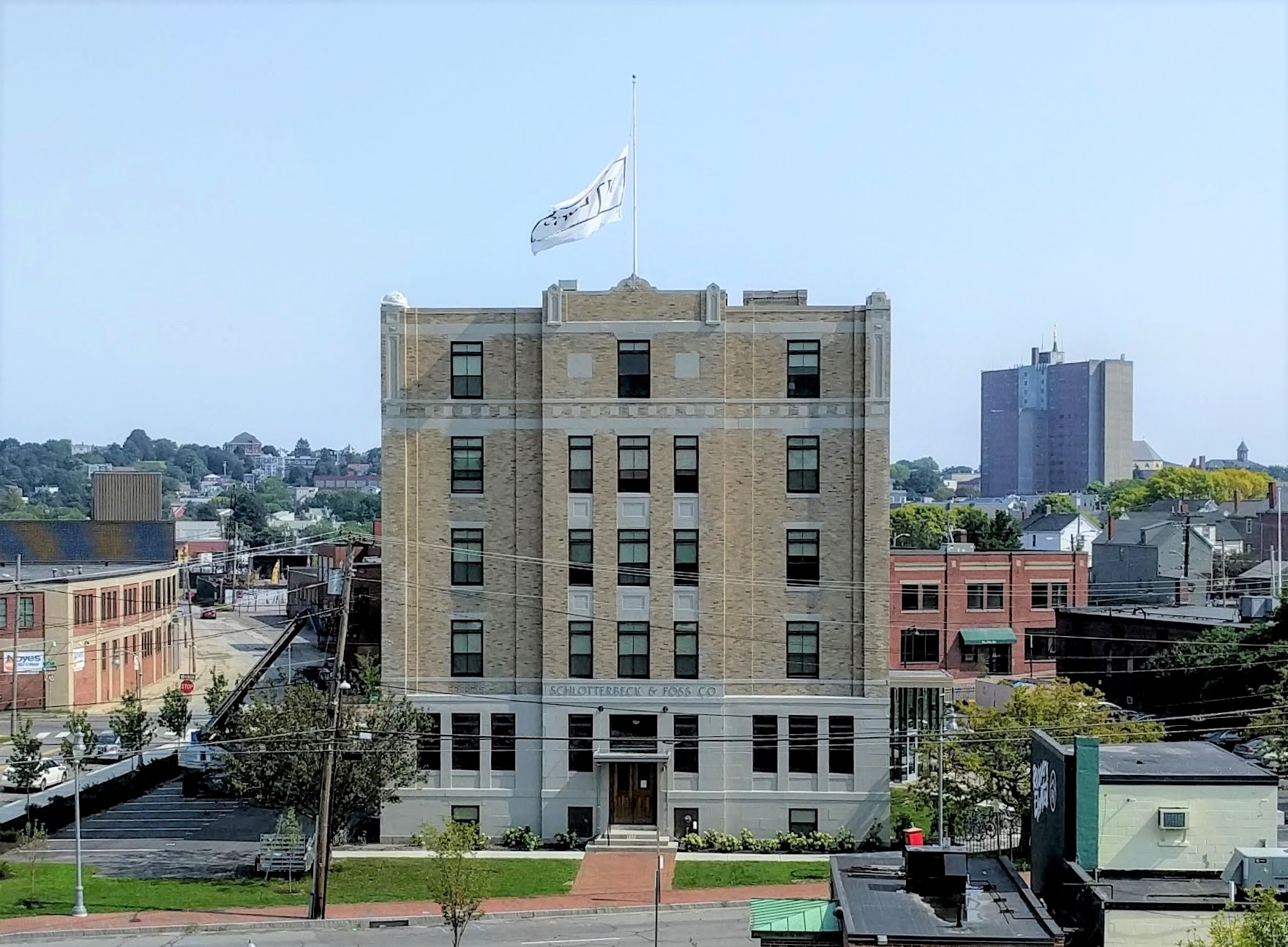
- Pictured in 2017

- Location within Maine Location within the United States
- Location: 117 Preble Street, Portland, Maine
- Coordinates: 43°39′37″N 70°15′47″W
- Area: less than one acre
- Built: 1927
- Architectural style: Art Deco
- NRHP reference No.: 16000436
- Added to NRHP: July 11, 2016

The Schlotterbeck and Foss Building is a historic factory building at 117 Preble Street in Portland, Maine. Built in 1927, it is a particularly rare example of Art Deco architecture in Portland, the only one known by the noted Maine architects John Calvin Stevens and John Howard Stevens. It was listed on the National Register of Historic Places in 2016.

== Description and history ==
The former Schlotterbeck and Foss building is located on the north side of Portland's downtown area, at the southeast corner of Preble and Kennebec Streets. The building is a five-story masonry structure, with a concrete frame and an exterior of buff brick with cast stone. The ground floor is finished in cast stone, while the upper floors are primarily brick with stone trim. The central three bays project slightly, and the main entrance at its base is sheltered by a metal canopy supported by chains. The building corners also project in the manner of pilasters, and have decorative Art Deco details in the top level. Its facade is topped by a low parapet with stepped caps at the corners.

Arthur Schlotterbeck, a German immigrant, established a pharmacy in Portland in 1866. In 1887 he was joined by Charles Foss, a Maine native, and the two embarked on the production of patent medicines, which were primarily marketed as remedies for a variety of female health issues. In 1892 they branched out into the production of flavored extracts for cooking. This build was designed for them by John Calvin Stevens and his son John Howard Stevens, and was completed in 1927. It is a rare surviving industrial design by the elder Stevens, and is the only known Art Deco design by the team. Its interior, designed for the manufacture, distribution, and marketing of the company's products, is also rare as a significantly unaltered example of period factory architecture, both inside and out.

== See also ==
- National Register of Historic Places listings in Portland, Maine
