= Nathan Clifford School =

Historic building in Portland, Maine

- U.S. National Register of Historic Places
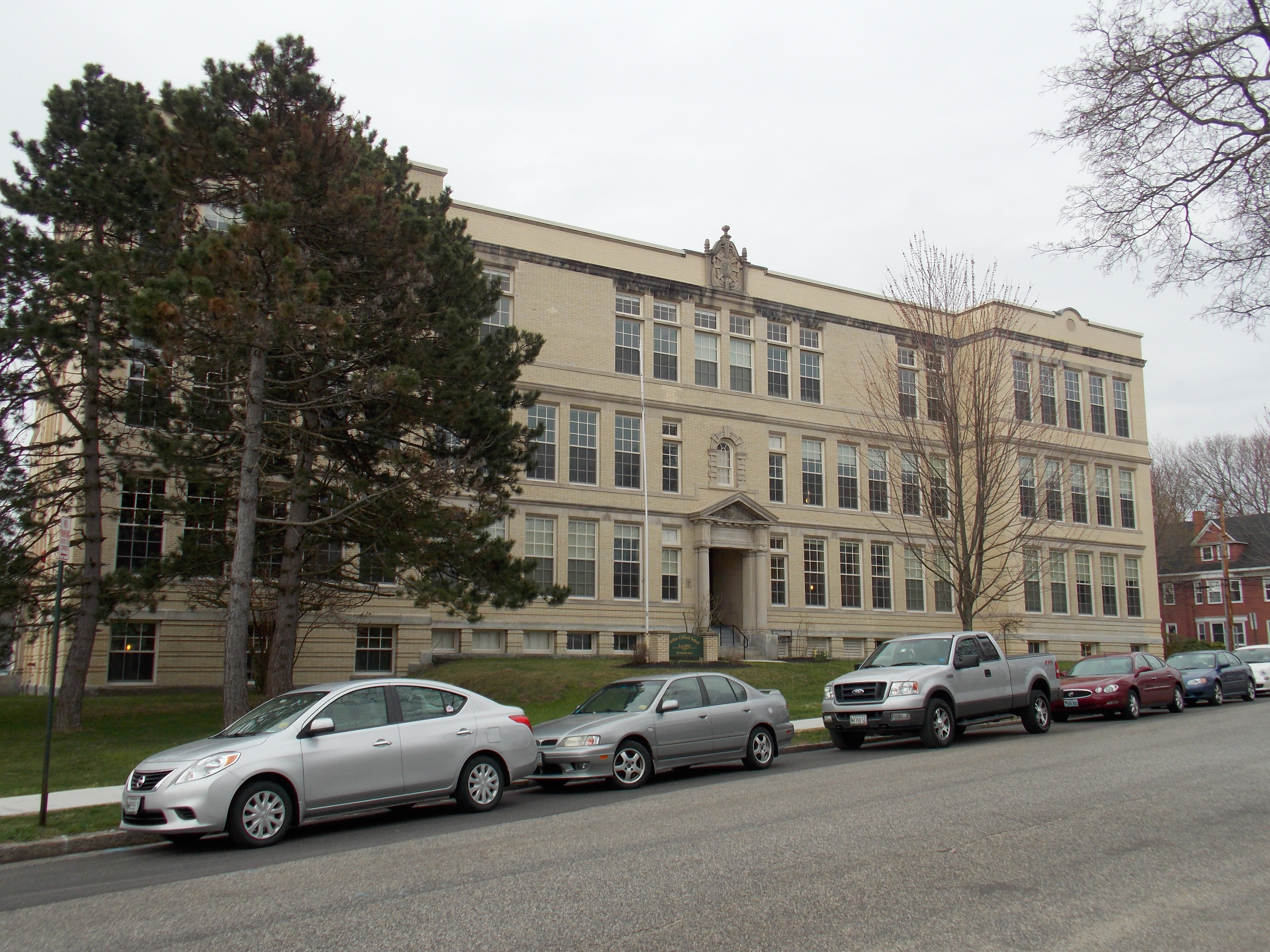

- Location within Maine Location within the United States
- Interactive map showing the location of Nathan Clifford School
- Area: 0.3 acres (0.12 ha)
- Built: 1907
- Architects: John Calvin Stevens; John Howard Stevens
- Architectural style: Classical Revival
- NRHP reference No.: 13000925
- Added to NRHP: December 18, 2013

The Nathan Clifford School is an apartment building and former elementary school building at 180 Falmouth Street in Portland, Maine. Built in 1907–09 to a design by John Calvin Stevens and his son John Howard Stevens, it was hailed as a model elementary school by the state, built with up-to-date technology to the latest standards. It was named for Maine politician and jurist Nathan Clifford. The school was closed in 2011, and has been converted to residential use.

== Description and history ==
The former Nathan Clifford School building is located in Portland's Oakdale neighborhood, on the south side of Falmouth Street, between Payson and Deane Streets. It is a three-story masonry Classical Revival structure, built out of brick with stone trim, set on a granite foundation. It has an H-shaped layout, with projecting wings flanking a central section. The center section is thirteen bays wide, with the main entrance at its center, sheltered by a portico with doubled columns, and a relief-carved pediment above. The flat roof is surrounded by a parapet, with a decorative medallion positioned above the entrance.

The building was designed by the noted Portland architect John Calvin Stevens and his son John Howard Stevens, and was opened to students in the spring in 1909. The school is named after the Maine statesman, diplomat and jurist Nathan Clifford, who is best known for being the 20th United States Attorney General and an Associate Justice of the United States Supreme Court. The school was lauded by the state as a model of its new standards for public schools, and received nationwide attention in architectural publications. It was designed with fire resistance in mind, wired for electricity, and had the latest in heating and ventilation technology installed.

The school was also home to the state's first special classes for children with vision problems, a program that was operated between 1932 and 1964. In the 1930s, murals funded by the Works Progress Administration were painted by a local artist and installed in the schools gymnasium; they have been relocated to the Ocean Avenue Elementary School, which replaced this building in 2011 as the elementary school for the Oakdale neighborhood.

In August 2013, the building was sold for $1 to a developer. The building now houses 22 residential units, called the Nathan Clifford Residences.

== See also ==
- National Register of Historic Places listings in Portland, Maine
