= James Leon Williams =

James Leon Williams

James Leon Williams (April 18, 1852 – February 23, 1932) was an American prosthodontist and a pioneer dental histologist. He discovered the significance of dental plaque.

== Biography ==
In 1785, Leon's great-grandfather, Jacob Williams, a U.S. Army captain during the American Revolution, settled in Maine. A native of Massachusetts, he had a son, Richard, around the year 1794. On May 25, 1829, Richard had a son, Calvin, who would be Leon's father.

Sometime around 1879, J. Leon Williams began a two-year apprenticeship by a Dr. Roberts in North Vassalboro, Maine and later began practicing in the same town. Williams later passed examinations for the DDS degree at the Baltimore College of Dental Surgery and the equivalent LDS degree in Ireland. He joined the Maine Dental Society and used the opportunity to borrow their microscope to study the histology and pathology of tooth enamel.

In the early 1880s, common crown and bridge techniques were not well known or widespread. Williams sought to make information on these techniques available to all dentists through the pages of The Dental Cosmos. In 1885, he embarked on a journey to improve the state of dental prostheses by designing more aesthetic artificial teeth that better matched the overall facial dimensions of the patient. He convinced an American artificial tooth manufacturer to take up his cause and produce his designs, on the condition that other dentists would embrace the new forms.

Williams also practiced dentistry in London and was one of the founders of the International Association for Dental Research.

He also was the author of The Home and Haunts of Shakespeare and had an interest in anthropology, including the Piltdown Man.
