= Burlington, Maine =

Town in Maine, United States

- Town
- Seal
- Motto: "The Way Maine Life Should Be"
- Location within Maine Location within the United States
- Coordinates: 45°14′47″N 68°22′57″W
- Country: United States
- State: Maine
- County: Penobscot

Area
  - Total: 56.25 sq mi (145.69 km^{2})
  - Land: 54.01 sq mi (139.89 km^{2})
  - Water: 2.24 sq mi (5.80 km^{2})
- Elevation: 213 ft (65 m)

Population (2020)
  - Total: 373
  - Density: 7.0/sq mi (2.7/km^{2})
- Time zone: UTC-5 (Eastern (EST))
  - Summer (DST): UTC-4 (EDT)
- ZIP code: 04417
- Area code: 207
- GNIS feature ID: 582378
- Website: burlingtonme.com

Burlington is a town in Penobscot County, Maine, United States. It is part of the Bangor Metropolitan Statistical Area. The population was 373 at the 2020 census.

== History ==
The area was originally known as "Hurd's Ridge," named after the first non-native settler, Tristram Hurd, who arrived in 1824. The town of Burlington was incorporated March 8, 1832.

== Geography ==
According to the United States Census Bureau, the town has a total area of 56.25 square miles (145.69 km^{2}), of which 54.01 square miles (139.89 km^{2}) is land and 2.24 square miles (5.80 km^{2}) is water.

== Demographics ==
Historical population
Census	Pop.	Note	%±
1840	350		—
1850	481		37.4%
1860	578		20.2%
1870	553		−4.3%
1880	536		−3.1%
1890	460		−14.2%
1900	394		−14.3%
1910	370		−6.1%
1920	330		−10.8%
1930	301		−8.8%
1940	338		12.3%
1950	425		25.7%
1960	353		−16.9%
1970	266		−24.6%
1980	322		21.1%
1990	360		11.8%
2000	351		−2.5%
2010	363		3.4%
2020	373		2.8%
U.S. Decennial Census

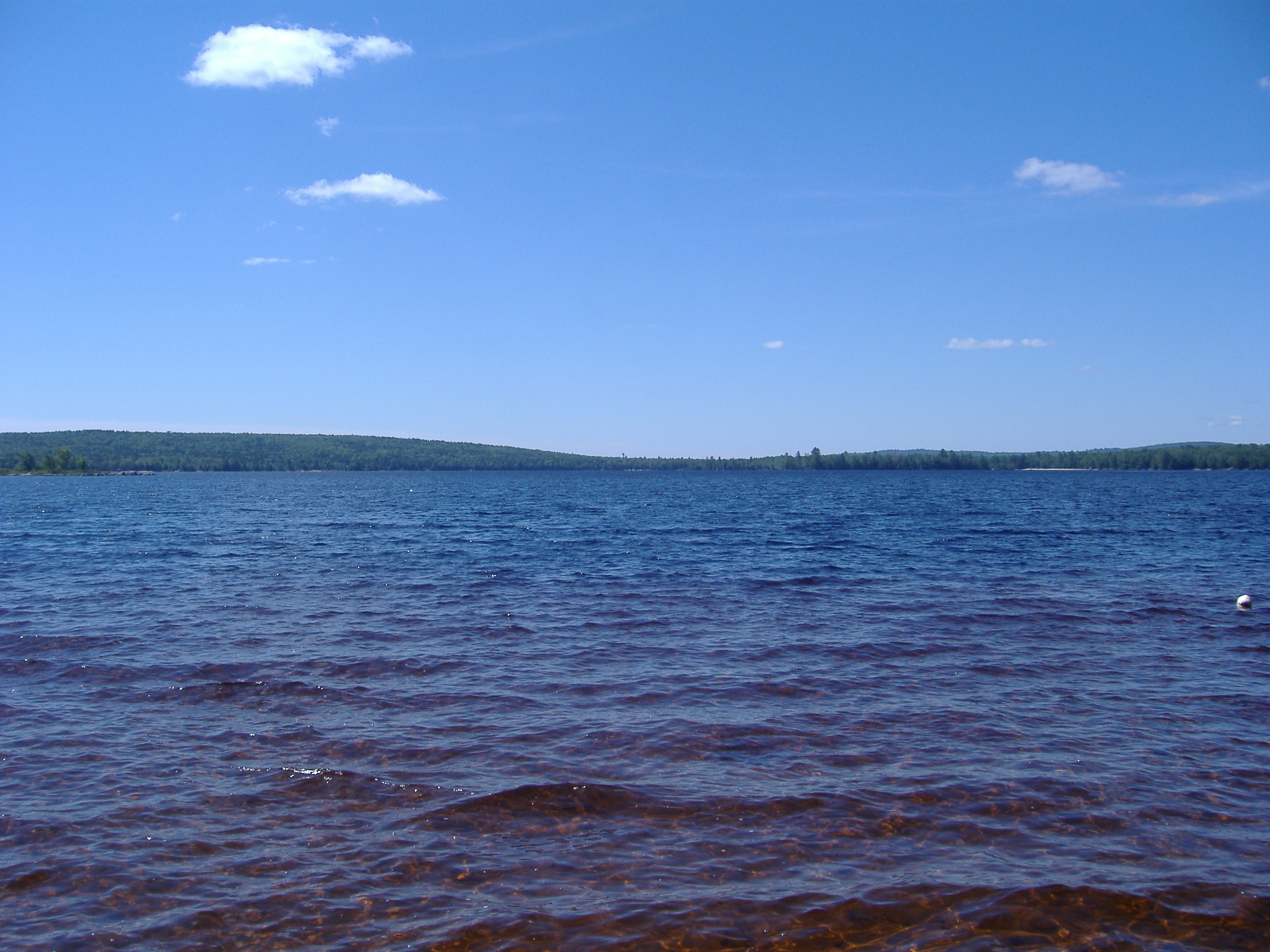
A lake in Burlington

=== 2010 census ===
As of the census of 2010, there were 363 people, 166 households, and 106 families living in the town. The population density was 6.7 inhabitants per square mile (2.6/km^{2}). There were 410 housing units at an average density of 7.6 per square mile (2.9/km^{2}). The racial makeup of the town was 99.4% White, 0.3% Asian, and 0.3% from two or more races. Hispanic or Latino of any race were 0.3% of the population.

There were 166 households, of which 19.9% had children under the age of 18 living with them, 54.8% were married couples living together, 6.6% had a female householder with no husband present, 2.4% had a male householder with no wife present, and 36.1% were non-families. 28.3% of all households were made up of individuals, and 15% had someone living alone who was 65 years of age or older. The average household size was 2.19 and the average family size was 2.61.

The median age in the town was 50 years. 17.9% of residents were under the age of 18; 4.4% were between the ages of 18 and 24; 20.7% were from 25 to 44; 37.3% were from 45 to 64; and 19.8% were 65 years of age or older. The gender makeup of the town was 50.4% male and 49.6% female.

=== 2000 census ===
As of the census of 2000, there were 351 people, 140 households, and 100 families living in the town. The population density was 6.5 inhabitants per square mile (2.5/km^{2}). There were 308 housing units at an average density of 5.7 per square mile (2.2/km^{2}). The racial makeup of the town was 100.00% White. Hispanic or Latino of any race were 0.57% of the population.

There were 140 households, out of which 29.3% had children under the age of 18 living with them, 63.6% were married couples living together, 5.7% had a female householder with no husband present, and 27.9% were non-families. 21.4% of all households were made up of individuals, and 7.1% had someone living alone who was 65 years of age or older. The average household size was 2.51 and the average family size was 2.91.

In the town, the population was spread out, with 21.1% under the age of 18, 10.0% from 18 to 24, 25.9% from 25 to 44, 26.5% from 45 to 64, and 16.5% who were 65 years of age or older. The median age was 42 years. For every 100 females, there were 105.3 males. For every 100 females age 18 and over, there were 108.3 males.

The median income for a household for females. The per capita income for the town was $11,573. About 6.5% of families and 10.9% of the population were below the poverty line, including 2.3% of those under age 18 and 3.1% of those age 65 or over.

== See also ==
- School Administrative Unit 31
