= Spruce gum =

Chewing material from the resin of spruce trees

Resin drops on a branch cut of a spruce tree

Spruce gum is a chewing material made from the resin of spruce trees. In North America, spruce resin was chewed by Native Americans and was later introduced to the early American pioneers and was sold commercially by the 19th century, by John B. Curtis among others. It has also been used as an adhesive. Indigenous women in North America used spruce gum to caulk seams of birch-bark canoes.

Spruce gum has been used medicinally, primarily to heal deep cuts and sores in the Dene culture. In the 1870s, Sisters of Providence located in Montreal, Canada developed a spruce gum syrup for treating coughs and bronchitis.

== Identification of spruce trees ==
Spruce gum is obtained from trees of the genus Picea, evergreen conifers widely distributed across boreal and temperate forests of the Northern Hemisphere. Spruce trees can be distinguished from other conifers by several morphological characteristics. Their needles are stiff, sharply pointed, and typically four-sided, allowing them to roll between the fingers. Each needle grows individually from a small woody projection on the twig known as a sterigma.

Spruce cones generally hang downward from the branches and fall intact when mature. They differ in this way from fir tree (Abies species) cones, which grow upright and disintegrate while still attached to the branch. Pine trees (Pinus species) can also be distinguished from spruce by their needle arrangement, as pine needles grow in bundles called fascicles rather than singly along the twig.

== Locating resin in forests ==
Spruce gum originates from resin that exudes from natural injuries in the bark. These injuries may be caused by insects, broken branches, animal damage, or environmental stress. As the resin flows outward it gradually hardens when exposed to air, forming small brittle deposits attached to the trunk or branches.

Historically, collectors searched forests for these hardened deposits and removed them from trees using knives, sticks, or other tools. In the nineteenth century some woodsmen specialized in gathering spruce gum and were known as “gummers”, supplying resin to early chewing gum manufacturers.

Freshly exuded resin is usually soft and sticky. Over time, exposure to air causes it to harden, making it easier to collect and more suitable for chewing.

Advertisement for Martin's Unadulterated Spruce Gum, late 19th-century

== Harvesting and purification ==
After collection, raw spruce resin often contains fragments of bark, wood, and other forest debris. Traditionally the resin is purified by heating it until it softens and then filtering or straining the material to remove impurities. The cleaned resin is then allowed to cool and harden again into small pieces suitable for chewing.

Purified spruce gum is typically brittle at room temperature but softens when warmed. When placed in the mouth, body heat and saliva gradually soften the resin and allow fragments to combine into a pliable chewing mass.

== Chewing characteristics ==
Natural spruce gum differs from modern chewing gum because it consists entirely of plant resin rather than synthetic gum bases. When first chewed it may fracture or crumble while still cool, but as it warms the resin softens and forms a cohesive mass that can be chewed for extended periods.

The flavor of spruce gum is typically described as strongly aromatic and resinous, reflecting the volatile compounds present in conifer resins. Historically, pieces of spruce gum could be stored between uses and re-softened when chewed again.

== Traditional medicinal uses ==
Spruce resin has long been used in traditional medicine in northern forest regions. Indigenous peoples of North America applied spruce pitch to cuts, sores, and skin irritations as a protective dressing. The resin was sometimes mixed with animal fat or other ingredients to produce salves used for treating wounds and skin ailments.

Spruce gum was also chewed as a traditional remedy for coughs, sore throats, and chest irritation. Modern research has identified antimicrobial and anti-inflammatory compounds in conifer resins, and purified spruce resin preparations have been investigated for their potential role in wound care.

== Other natural resin chewing gums ==
Spruce gum is one of several chewing materials derived from plant resins. In the Mediterranean region, for example, mastic gum is produced from the resin of the shrub Pistacia lentiscus. Like spruce gum, mastic resin hardens naturally and softens when chewed.

Historically, a variety of plant resins and latexes were used as chewing substances in different cultures. In North America, spruce resin was widely chewed by Indigenous peoples and later adopted by European settlers, eventually becoming one of the earliest forms of commercially packaged chewing gum.

== Decline and modern revival ==
Natural resin chewing gums declined in commercial use during the twentieth century as industrial chewing gum manufacturers adopted synthetic gum bases made from rubber-like polymers. These materials provided consistent texture and longer shelf life and were easier to manufacture on a large scale.

In recent years, however, there has been renewed interest in traditional and natural chewing materials as part of broader interest in historical foods, natural products, and ethnobotanical practices.
