= Orono (CDP), Maine =

Orono, Maine
- Census-designated place
- Location within Maine Location within the United States
- Coordinates: 44°52′26″N 68°41′12″W
- Country: United States
- State: Maine
- County: Penobscot

Area
  - Total: 7.71 sq mi (19.98 km^{2})
  - Land: 7.05 sq mi (18.27 km^{2})
  - Water: 0.66 sq mi (1.71 km^{2})
- Elevation: 157 ft (48 m)

Population (2020)
  - Total: 10,185
  - Density: 1,444.0/sq mi (557.54/km^{2})
- Time zone: UTC-5 (Eastern (EST))
  - Summer (DST): UTC-4 (EDT)
- ZIP Codes: 04473, 04469
- Area code: 207
- FIPS code: 23-55575
- GNIS feature ID: 2377947

Orono is a census-designated place (CDP) consisting of the eastern portion of the town of Orono in Penobscot County, Maine, United States. The population of the CDP was 9,474 at the 2010 census.

== Geography ==
The Orono CDP consists of all of the town east of Interstate 95, including the primary settled area in the town.

According to the United States Census Bureau, the CDP has a total area of 7.7 square miles (20.0 km^{2}), of which 7.1 square miles (18.3 km^{2}) is land and 0.66 square miles (1.7 km^{2}), or 8.55%, is water.

== Demographics ==
Historical population
Census	Pop.	Note	%±
2020	10,185		—
U.S. Decennial Census

As of the census of 2000, there were 8,253 people, 2,343 households, and 1,047 families residing in the CDP. The population density was 1,133.1 inhabitants per square mile (437.5/km^{2}). There were 2,472 housing units at an average density of 339.4 per square mile (131.0/km^{2}). The racial makeup of the CDP was 93.30% White, 1.47% Black or African American, 0.95% Native American, 2.57% Asian, 0.06% Pacific Islander, 0.55% from other races, and 1.11% from two or more races. Hispanic or Latino of any race were 1.27% of the population.

There were 2,343 households, out of which 20.7% had children under the age of 18 living with them, 33.8% were married couples living together, 8.5% had a female householder with no husband present, and 55.3% were non-families. 33.0% of all households were made up of individuals, and 10.8% had someone living alone who was 65 years of age or older. The average household size was 2.19 and the average family size was 2.81.

In the CDP, the population was spread out, with 10.7% under the age of 18, 51.8% from 18 to 24, 15.9% from 25 to 44, 12.4% from 45 to 64, and 9.2% who were 65 years of age or older. The median age was 22 years. For every 100 females, there were 102.2 males. For every 100 females age 18 and over, there were 101.5 males.

The median income for a household in the CDP was $30,262, and the median income for a family was $51,613. Males had a median income of $34,500 versus $24,602 for females. The per capita income for the CDP was $14,252. About 10.8% of families and 27.5% of the population were below the poverty line, including 24.5% of those under age 18 and 6.6% of those age 65 or over.

== Education ==
It is in Regional School Unit 26. Orono High School is the comprehensive high school.

Much of the grounds of the University of Maine are in the CDP.
