= Enfield, Maine =

Town in Maine, United States

- Town
- Seal

- Location within Maine Location within the United States
- Coordinates: 45°15′09″N 68°36′42″W
- Country: United States
- State: Maine
- County: Penobscot
- Incorporated: January 31, 1835

Area
  - Total: 33.00 sq mi (85.47 km^{2})
  - Land: 27.74 sq mi (71.85 km^{2})
  - Water: 5.26 sq mi (13.62 km^{2})
- Elevation: 210 ft (64 m)

Population (2020)
  - Total: 1,435
  - Density: 52/sq mi (20/km^{2})
- Time zone: UTC-5 (Eastern (EST))
  - Summer (DST): UTC-4 (EDT)
- ZIP code: 04493
- Area code: 207
- FIPS code: 23-23620
- GNIS feature ID: 582467
- Website: www.enfieldmaine.org

Enfield is a town in Penobscot County, Maine, United States. The population was 1,435 at the 2020 census. There is also a large seasonal population with many cottages located on Cold Stream Pond, a lake within the town.

== History ==
Enfield was first settled on the east bank of the Penobscot River about 1820, and was originally called Cold Stream. It was incorporated on January 31, 1835.

In 1891, four armed men boarded and attempted to rob a train as it passed through Enfield, shooting at the engineer, fireman, and conductors. They also shot up the train station. They failed in their attempt to break into the mail-car, but it was a dark night and they escaped capture.

== Geography ==
According to the United States Census Bureau, the town has a total area of 33.00 square miles (85.47 km^{2}), of which 27.74 square miles (71.85 km^{2}) is land and 5.26 square miles (13.62 km^{2}) is water.

=== Cold Stream Pond ===
Cold Stream Pond
- Location within Maine
- Location: Penobscot County, Maine
- Coordinates: 45°15′N 68°32′W
- Basin countries: United States
- Max. length: 5.5 mi (8.9 km)
- Max. width: 2.5 mi (4.0 km)
- Surface area: 3,619 acres (1,465 ha)
- Max. depth: 104 feet (32 m)
- Water volume: 145,697 acre⋅ft (179,715,000 m^{3})
- Surface elevation: 187 ft (57 m)

Cold Stream Pond covers the eastern side of the town of Enfield. There is a public boat launching facility on Old Hatchery Road off Maine State Route 188. A ridge creates a narrow portion of the pond separating a smaller northern basin from the larger southern basin. Summer oxygen concentrations often become unfavorably low in the northern basin. The most significant tributary is Smelt Brook draining Upper Cold Stream Pond and Little Round Pond into the northern basin from Lincoln. The southwestern corner of the pond overflows through Cold Stream, 5 miles (8.0 km) south to reach the Passadumkeag River 2 miles (3.2 km) upstream of the Penobscot River. Cobb State Fish Hatchery is located beside the outlet, using water from the pond to raise fish for stocking elsewhere. A self-sustaining native population of lake trout spawn in Webb Cove in the southeastern corner of the pond. The lake trout forage on a population of rainbow smelt spawning in Smelt Brook. Atlantic salmon were introduced to the pond in 1876.

== Demographics ==
Historical population
Census	Pop.	Note	%±
1840	346		—
1850	396		14.5%
1860	526		32.8%
1870	545		3.6%
1880	489		−10.3%
1890	769		57.3%
1900	1,062		38.1%
1910	970		−8.7%
1920	1,041		7.3%
1930	1,138		9.3%
1940	979		−14.0%
1950	1,196		22.2%
1960	1,098		−8.2%
1970	1,148		4.6%
1980	1,397		21.7%
1990	1,476		5.7%
2000	1,616		9.5%
2010	1,607		−0.6%
2020	1,435		−10.7%
U.S. Decennial Census

=== 2010 census ===
As of the census of 2010, there were 1,607 people, 650 households, and 461 families living in the town. The population density was 57.9 inhabitants per square mile (22.4/km^{2}). There were 937 housing units at an average density of 33.8 per square mile (13.1/km^{2}). The racial makeup of the town was 97.6% White, 0.1% African American, 1.2% Native American, 0.2% from other races, and 0.9% from two or more races. Hispanic or Latino of any race were 0.2% of the population.

There were 650 households, of which 27.7% had children under the age of 18 living with them, 58.6% were married couples living together, 8.2% had a female householder with no husband present, 4.2% had a male householder with no wife present, and 29.1% were non-families. 20.5% of all households were made up of individuals, and 9.1% had someone living alone who was 65 years of age or older. The average household size was 2.47 and the average family size was 2.85.

The median age in the town was 44.3 years. 20.5% of residents were under the age of 18; 7.6% were between the ages of 18 and 24; 22.8% were from 25 to 44; 32.4% were from 45 to 64; and 16.7% were 65 years of age or older. The gender makeup of the town was 48.3% male and 51.7% female.

=== 2000 census ===
As of the census of 2000, there were 1,616 people, 612 households, and 463 families living in the town. The population density was 58.0 inhabitants per square mile (22.4/km^{2}). There were 888 housing units at an average density of 31.8 per square mile (12.3/km^{2}). The racial makeup of the town was 98.76% White, 0.06% African American, 0.19% Native American, 0.06% Asian, and 0.93% from two or more races. Hispanic or Latino of any race were 0.37% of the population.

There were 612 households, out of which 34.0% had children under the age of 18 living with them, 66.2% were married couples living together, 5.9% had a female householder with no husband present, and 24.2% were non-families. 18.6% of all households were made up of individuals, and 9.2% had someone living alone who was 65 years of age or older. The average household size was 2.64 and the average family size was 3.00.

In the town, the population was spread out, with 26.4% under the age of 18, 6.6% from 18 to 24, 29.5% from 25 to 44, 25.2% from 45 to 64, and 12.3% who were 65 years of age or older. The median age was 38 years. For every 100 females, there were 101.7 males. For every 100 females age 18 and over, there were 100.8 males.

The median income for a household in the town was $36,458, and the median income for a family was $42,788. Males had a median income of $32,500 versus $22,614 for females. The per capita income for the town was $15,799. About 10.1% of families and 13.5% of the population were below the poverty line, including 12.7% of those under age 18 and 18.7% of those age 65 or over.

=== Local schools ===
See School Administrative Unit 31

== Notable people ==
- Merle Fogg (1898–1928), stunt-pilot, namesake of the Merle Fogg Airport in Florida
- Matthew Mulligan, tight end for the New England Patriots
