= Howland, Maine =

Town in Maine, United States

- Town
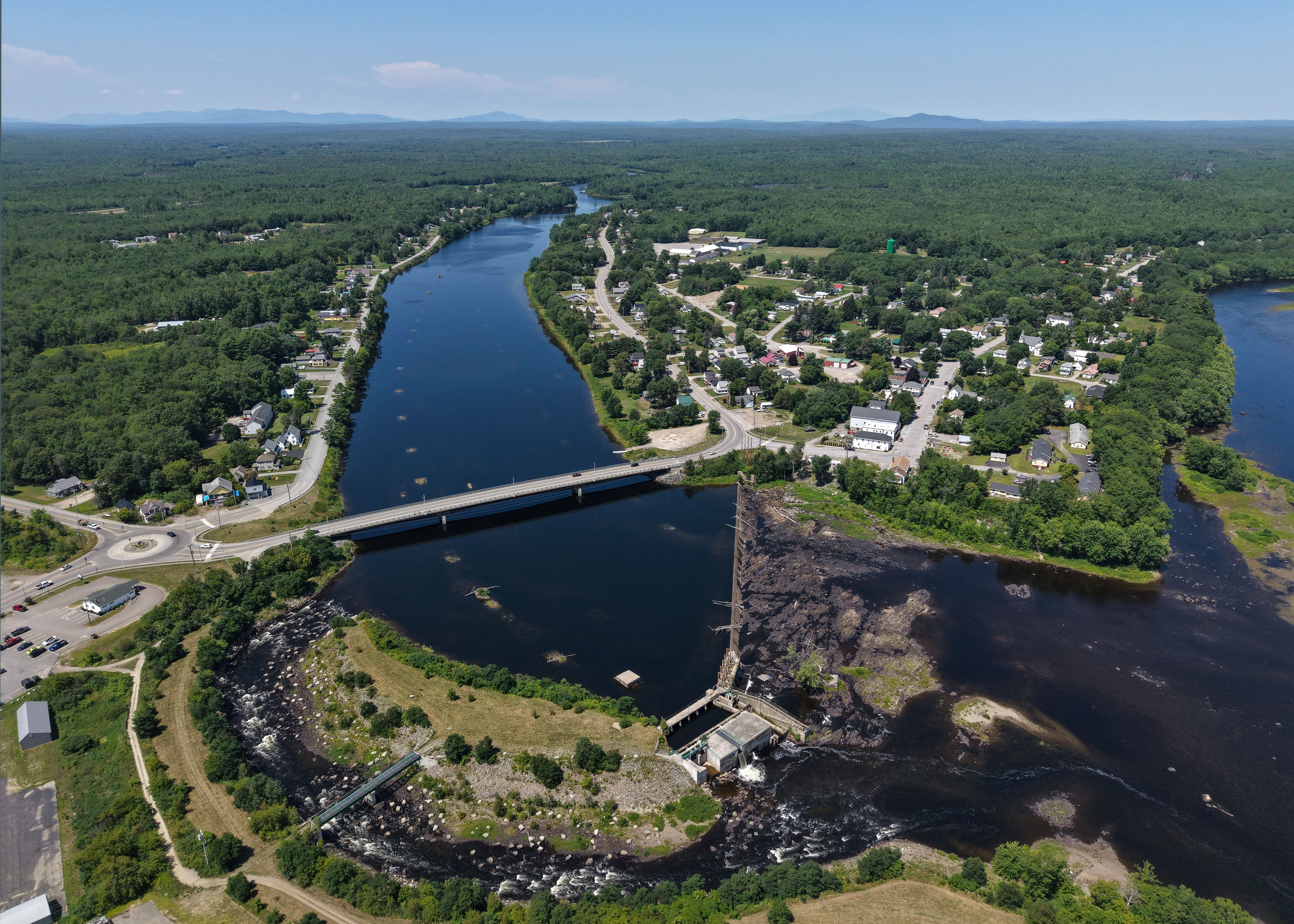
- Aerial view (2026)

- Seal

- Location within Maine Location within the United States
- Coordinates: 45°14′30″N 68°42′47″W
- Country: United States
- State: Maine
- County: Penobscot

Area
  - Total: 35.62 sq mi (92.26 km^{2})
  - Land: 34.92 sq mi (90.44 km^{2})
  - Water: 0.70 sq mi (1.81 km^{2})
- Elevation: 148 ft (45 m)

Population (2020)
  - Total: 1,094
  - Density: 31/sq mi (12.1/km^{2})
- Time zone: UTC-5 (Eastern (EST))
  - Summer (DST): UTC-4 (EDT)
- ZIP Codes: 04448 (Howland); 04453 (LaGrange)
- Area code: 207
- FIPS code: 23-34190
- GNIS feature ID: 582526
- Website: www.howlandmaine.com

Howland is a town in Penobscot County, Maine, United States, which was settled in 1818. It was named after John Howland, one of the passengers on the Mayflower. The population was 1,094 at the 2020 census. It contains a census-designated place of the same name.

== Geography ==
The town is on the west bank of the Penobscot River at its confluence with the Piscataquis River. According to the United States Census Bureau, the town has a total area of 35.62 square miles (92.26 km^{2}), of which 34.92 square miles (90.44 km^{2}) is land and 0.70 square miles (1.81 km^{2}) is water.

=== Climate ===
This climatic region is typified by large seasonal temperature differences, with warm to hot (and often humid) summers and cold (sometimes severely cold) winters. According to the Köppen Climate Classification system, Howland has a humid continental climate, abbreviated "Dfb" on climate maps.

== Demographics ==
Historical population
Census	Pop.	Note	%±
1830	329		—
1840	322		−2.1%
1850	214		−33.5%
1860	174		−18.7%
1870	176		1.1%
1880	137		−22.2%
1890	171		24.8%
1900	519		203.5%
1910	494		−4.8%
1920	724		46.6%
1930	1,605		121.7%
1940	1,189		−25.9%
1950	1,441		21.2%
1960	1,362		−5.5%
1970	1,468		7.8%
1980	1,602		9.1%
1990	1,435		−10.4%
2000	1,362		−5.1%
2010	1,241		−8.9%
2020	1,094		−11.8%
U.S. Decennial Census

As of the 2000 census, the median income for a household in the town was $34,082, and the median income for a family was $36,302. Males had a median income of $32,000 versus $17,386 for females. The per capita income for the town was $15,466. About 6.9% of families and 11.5% of the population were below the poverty line, including 10.8% of those under the age of 18 and 25.3% ages 65 or older.

=== 2010 census ===
As of the 2010 census, there were 1,241 people, 523 households, and 330 families residing in the town. The population density was 35.6 inhabitants per square mile (13.7/km^{2}). There were 639 housing units at an average density of 18.3 per square mile (7.1/km^{2}). The racial makeup of the town was 97.4% White, 0.6% African American, 0.6% Native American, 0.2% Asian, and 1.3% from two or more races. Hispanic or Latino of any race were 0.4% of the population.

There were 523 households, of which 22.4% had children under the age of 18 living with them, 49.1% were headed by married couples living together, 9.8% had a female householder with no husband present, and 36.9% were non-families. 30.0% of all households were made up of individuals, and 16.2% were someone living alone who was 65 years of age or older. The average household size was 2.32, and the average family size was 2.82.

In the town, the population was spread out, with 19.3% under the age of 18, 8.1% from 18 to 24, 21.6% from 25 to 44, 29.9% from 45 to 64, and 21.2% who were 65 years of age or older. The median age was 45.5 years.

== Local schools ==
See MSAD 31

== Fire and ambulance ==
Located in Howland, Maine, Central Maine Highlands Fire and EMS District # 1 provides 24/7 coverage for Howland, as well as neighboring towns Enfield, Passadumkeag, Edinburg, Maxfield, Sebois, Lowell, Burlington, and Mattamiscontis. The Department consist of 19 full time Firefighter and EMS providers. The department is funded by taxes from all towns located within the district and their payroll is largely funded by non-emergent ambulance transfers. Other equipment purchases which the town cannot afford are paid for through fundraising efforts.

Since the 2015, the department has undergone several changes that have resulted in a more modern, efficient service. With the adoption of new technology, as well as the department's recent launch of a website focused on recruiting and informing the public of news, announcements and fire safety related content, the department has grown into one of the leading career departments in northern Maine.

== Notable people ==
- Matthew Mulligan (born 1985), retired NFL tight end
- Percy Spencer (1894–1970), engineer and inventor of the microwave oven
