= Hudson, Maine =

Town in Maine, United States

- Town
- Location within Maine Location within the United States
- Coordinates: 45°01′12″N 68°52′46″W
- Country: United States
- State: Maine
- County: Penobscot

Area
  - Total: 40.03 sq mi (103.68 km^{2})
  - Land: 37.64 sq mi (97.49 km^{2})
  - Water: 2.39 sq mi (6.19 km^{2})
- Elevation: 157 ft (48 m)

Population (2020)
  - Total: 1,416
  - Density: 38/sq mi (14.5/km^{2})
- Time zone: UTC-5 (Eastern (EST))
  - Summer (DST): UTC-4 (EDT)
- ZIP code: 04449
- Area code: 207
- FIPS code: 23-34365
- GNIS feature ID: 582527
- Website: townofhudson.me

Hudson is a town in Penobscot County, Maine, United States. The population was 1,416 at the 2020 census.

== History ==
Hudson was first settled about 1800. In 1824, it became a plantation and was named "Jackson", probably after Andrew Jackson. In 1825, however, it was incorporated as the town of "Kirkland". The name was changed to "Hudson" in 1854 after Hudson, Massachusetts. However Hudson, Massachusetts was not incorporated as such until 1866.

== Geography ==
According to the United States Census Bureau, the town has a total area of 40.03 square miles (103.68 km^{2}), of which 37.64 square miles (97.49 km^{2}) is land and 2.39 square miles (6.19 km^{2}) is water.

== Demographics ==
Historical population
Census	Pop.	Note	%±
1830	249		—
1840	351		41.0%
1850	717		104.3%
1860	771		7.5%
1870	739		−4.2%
1880	659		−10.8%
1890	510		−22.6%
1900	430		−15.7%
1910	403		−6.3%
1920	369		−8.4%
1930	363		−1.6%
1940	372		2.5%
1950	455		22.3%
1960	542		19.1%
1970	482		−11.1%
1980	797		65.4%
1990	1,048		31.5%
2000	1,393		32.9%
2010	1,536		10.3%
2020	1,416		−7.8%
U.S. Decennial Census

=== 2010 census ===
As of the census of 2010, there were 1,536 people, 590 households, and 427 families living in the town. The population density was 40.8 inhabitants per square mile (15.8/km^{2}). There were 786 housing units at an average density of 20.9 per square mile (8.1/km^{2}). The racial makeup of the town was 97.7% White, 0.1% African American, 0.7% Native American, 0.2% Asian, and 1.3% from two or more races. Hispanic or Latino of any race were 0.7% of the population.

There were 590 households, of which 33.1% had children under the age of 18 living with them, 56.3% were married couples living together, 10.8% had a female householder with no husband present, 5.3% had a male householder with no wife present, and 27.6% were non-families. 17.5% of all households were made up of individuals, and 4.5% had someone living alone who was 65 years of age or older. The average household size was 2.60 and the average family size was 2.91.

The median age in the town was 40 years. 21.9% of residents were under the age of 18; 7.3% were between the ages of 18 and 24; 28.3% were from 25 to 44; 32.3% were from 45 to 64; and 10.1% were 65 years of age or older. The gender makeup of the town was 49.9% male and 50.1% female.

=== 2000 census ===
At the 2000 census, there were 1,393 people, 508 households and 386 families living in the town. The population density was 36.8 inhabitants per square mile (14.2/km^{2}). There were 677 housing units at an average density of 17.9 per square mile (6.9/km^{2}). The racial makeup of the town was 97.85% White, 0.50% African American, 0.72% Native American, 0.14% Pacific Islander, and 0.79% from two or more races. Hispanic or Latino of any race were 0.22% of the population.

There were 508 households, of which 37.6% had children under the age of 18 living with them, 62.8% were married couples living together, 7.9% had a female householder with no husband present, and 24.0% were non-families. 15.2% of all households were made up of individuals, and 3.5% had someone living alone who was 65 years of age or older. The average household size was 2.74 and the average family size was 3.03.

27.5% of the population were under the age of 18, 7.7% from 18 to 24, 34.7% from 25 to 44, 23.0% from 45 to 64, and 7.1% who were 65 years of age or older. The median age was 35 years. For every 100 females, there were 105.8 males. For every 100 females age 18 and over, there were 106.5 males.

The median household income was $38,594 and the median family income was $40,982. Males had a median income of $32,188 versus $21,146 for females. The per capita income for the town was $15,850. About 11.2% of families and 13.0% of the population were below the poverty line, including 17.1% of those under age 18 and 5.8% of those age 65 or over.

== Notable person ==
- Maxwell Anderson, playwright and screenwriter, Pulitzer Prize winner
