= Milo (CDP), Maine =

Milo, Maine
- Census-designated place
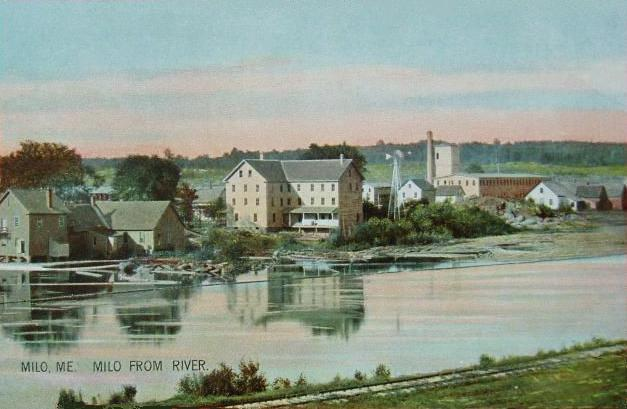

- Location in Piscataquis County and the state of Maine.

- Location within Maine Location within the United States
- Coordinates: 45°15′1″N 68°58′59″W
- Country: United States
- State: Maine
- County: Piscataquis

Area
  - Total: 8.05 sq mi (20.86 km^{2})
  - Land: 7.75 sq mi (20.07 km^{2})
  - Water: 0.31 sq mi (0.80 km^{2})
- Elevation: 318 ft (97 m)

Population (2020)
  - Total: 1,751
  - Density: 226.0/sq mi (87.26/km^{2})
- Time zone: UTC-5 (Eastern (EST))
  - Summer (DST): UTC-4 (EDT)
- ZIP code: 04463
- Area code: 207
- FIPS code: 23-45985
- GNIS feature ID: 0571407

Milo is a census-designated place (CDP) in the town of Milo in Piscataquis County, Maine, United States. The population was 1,898 at the 2000 census.

== Geography ==
Milo is located at 45°15′0″N 68°58′59″W (45.250182, −68.983186).

According to the United States Census Bureau, the CDP has a total area of 8.0 square miles (20.8 km^{2}), of which 7.8 square miles (20.1 km^{2}) is land and 0.2 square mile (0.6 km^{2}) (3.12%) is water. Milo is located at the confluence of the Sebec River with the Piscataquis River.

== Demographics ==
Historical population
Census	Pop.	Note	%±
2020	1,751		—
U.S. Decennial Census

As of the census of 2000, there were 1,898 people, 830 households, and 522 families residing in the CDP. The population density was 244.2 inhabitants per square mile (94.3/km^{2}). There were 977 housing units at an average density of 125.7 per square mile (48.5/km^{2}). The racial makeup of the CDP was 98.52% White, 0.42% Black or African American, 0.42% Native American, 0.11% Asian, 0.05% from other races, and 0.47% from two or more races. Hispanic or Latino of any race were 0.21% of the population.

There were 830 households, out of which 28.4% had children under the age of 18 living with them, 48.6% were married couples living together, 10.2% had a female householder with no husband present, and 37.0% were non-families. 31.2% of all households were made up of individuals, and 17.8% had someone living alone who was 65 years of age or older. The average household size was 2.29 and the average family size was 2.84.

In the CDP, the population was spread out, with 24.0% under the age of 18, 7.1% from 18 to 24, 26.7% from 25 to 44, 22.5% from 45 to 64, and 19.8% who were 65 years of age or older. The median age was 41 years. For every 100 females, there were 84.5 males. For every 100 females age 18 and over, there were 88.4 males.

The median income for a household in the CDP was $23,870, and the median income for a family was $32,094. Males had a median income of $29,833 versus $19,554 for females. The per capita income for the CDP was $12,752. About 13.4% of families and 17.2% of the population were below the poverty line, including 22.1% of those under age 18 and 14.2% of those age 65 or over.
