= Bradford, Maine =

Town in Maine, United States

- Town
- Seal
- Motto: "Home of Spruce Gum"
- Location within Maine Location within the United States
- Coordinates: 45°05′48″N 68°52′36″W
- Country: United States
- State: Maine
- County: Penobscot

Area
  - Total: 41.18 sq mi (106.66 km^{2})
  - Land: 41.18 sq mi (106.66 km^{2})
  - Water: 0 sq mi (0 km^{2})
- Elevation: 282 ft (86 m)

Population (2020)
  - Total: 1,184
  - Density: 29/sq mi (11.1/km^{2})
- Time zone: UTC-5 (Eastern (EST))
  - Summer (DST): UTC-4 (EDT)
- ZIP Code: 04410
- Area code: 207
- FIPS code: 23-06575
- GNIS feature ID: 582363
- Website: www.bradfordme.org

Bradford is a town in Penobscot County, Maine, United States. It is part of the Bangor, Maine Metropolitan Statistical Area. The population was 1,184 at the 2020 census.

== History ==
According to some early documents, Bradford was said to be first settled between 1803 and 1805 by James White and Robert Marshall of Thomaston however early settler Cornelius Bradford was among the first to live in the settlement and died there in 1790. Cornelius Bradford is a lineal descendant of Governor William Bradford of the Plymouth Colony. He was the eldest child of Joshua and Hannah Bradford, who were killed during the Raid on Meduncook. Bradford was organized as Blakesburg Plantation in 1820 and was incorporated as a town on March 12, 1831. By the mid-1850s its population had peaked at 1,500, which is about 200 more people than it has today.

A tornado passed through Bradford in 1872, destroying two houses. Buildings in the nearby towns of Parkman and Dover were also demolished.

== Geography ==
According to the United States Census Bureau, the town has a total area of 41.18 square miles (106.66 km^{2}), all land.

== Demographics ==
Historical population
Census	Pop.	Note	%±
1840	1,000		—
1850	1,296		29.6%
1860	1,558		20.2%
1870	1,487		−4.6%
1880	1,460		−1.8%
1890	1,215		−16.8%
1900	954		−21.5%
1910	930		−2.5%
1920	738		−20.6%
1930	721		−2.3%
1940	734		1.8%
1950	793		8.0%
1960	690		−13.0%
1970	569		−17.5%
1980	888		56.1%
1990	1,103		24.2%
2000	1,186		7.5%
2010	1,290		8.8%
2020	1,184		−8.2%
U.S. Decennial Census

=== 2010 census ===
As of the census of 2010, there were 1,290 people, 493 households, and 338 families living in the town. The population density was 31.3 inhabitants per square mile (12.1/km^{2}). There were 583 housing units at an average density of 14.2 per square mile (5.5/km^{2}). The racial makeup of the town was 96.4% White, 0.8% African American, 0.9% Native American, 0.1% Asian, 0.3% from other races, and 1.6% from two or more races. Hispanic or Latino of any race were 1.6% of the population.

There were 493 households, of which 33.3% had children under the age of 18 living with them, 51.9% were married couples living together, 11.4% had a female householder with no husband present, 5.3% had a male householder with no wife present, and 31.4% were non-families. 22.1% of all households were made up of individuals, and 8.1% had someone living alone who was 65 years of age or older. The average household size was 2.62 and the average family size was 3.01.

The median age in the town was 40.4 years. 24% of residents were under the age of 18; 8.9% were between the ages of 18 and 24; 24.2% were from 25 to 44; 31.5% were from 45 to 64; and 11.3% were 65 years of age or older. The gender makeup of the town was 51.5% male and 48.5% female.

=== 2000 census ===
As of the census of 2000, there were 1,186 people, 434 households, and 322 families living in the town. The population density was 28.7 inhabitants per square mile (11.1/km^{2}). There were 502 housing units at an average density of 12.2 per square mile (4.7/km^{2}). The racial makeup of the town was 97.39% White, 0.34% African American, 0.25% Native American, 0.84% from other races, and 1.18% from two or more races. Hispanic or Latino of any race were 0.93% of the population.

There were 434 households, out of which 38.0% had children under the age of 18 living with them, 59.7% were married couples living together, 10.4% had a female householder with no husband present, and 25.6% were non-families. 18.2% of all households were made up of individuals, and 7.6% had someone living alone who was 65 years of age or older. The average household size was 2.73 and the average family size was 3.04.

In the town, the population was spread out, with 28.1% under the age of 18, 6.5% from 18 to 24, 32.5% from 25 to 44, 20.8% from 45 to 64, and 12.1% who were 65 years of age or older. The median age was 35 years. For every 100 females, there were 107.0 males. For every 100 females age 18 and over, there were 103.1 males.

The median income for a household in the town was $35,216, and the median income for a family was $36,786. Males had a median income of $28,427 versus $23,000 for females. The per capita income for the town was $13,853. About 11.6% of families and 14.6% of the population were below the poverty line, including 17.7% of those under age 18 and 11.7% of those age 65 or over.
