= LaGrange, Maine =

Town in Maine, United States

- Town
- Logo

- Location within Maine Location within the United States
- Coordinates: 45°10′03″N 68°48′25″W
- Country: United States
- State: Maine
- County: Penobscot

Area
  - Total: 49.51 sq mi (128.23 km^{2})
  - Land: 49.47 sq mi (128.13 km^{2})
  - Water: 0.039 sq mi (0.10 km^{2})
- Elevation: 233 ft (71 m)

Population (2020)
  - Total: 635
  - Density: 13/sq mi (5/km^{2})
- Time zone: UTC-5 (Eastern (EST))
  - Summer (DST): UTC-4 (EDT)
- ZIP code: 04453
- Area code: 207
- FIPS code: 23-37760
- GNIS feature ID: 582546
- Website: lagrangeme.com

LaGrange is a town in Penobscot County, Maine, United States. The population was 635 at the 2020 census.

== History ==
LaGrange and surrounding towns were the site of a great forest fire in 1947.

== Geography ==
According to the United States Census Bureau, the town has a total area of 49.51 square miles (128.23 km^{2}), of which 49.47 square miles (128.13 km^{2}) is land and 0.04 square miles (0.10 km^{2}) is water.

== Demographics ==
Historical population
Census	Pop.	Note	%±
1840	336		—
1850	482		43.5%
1860	690		43.2%
1870	622		−9.9%
1880	721		15.9%
1890	721		0.0%
1900	574		−20.4%
1910	590		2.8%
1920	478		−19.0%
1930	468		−2.1%
1940	508		8.5%
1950	511		0.6%
1960	424		−17.0%
1970	393		−7.3%
1980	509		29.5%
1990	557		9.4%
2000	747		34.1%
2010	708		−5.2%
2020	635		−10.3%
U.S. Decennial Census

=== 2010 census ===
As of the census of 2010, there were 708 people, 298 households, and 189 families living in the town. The population density was 14.3 inhabitants per square mile (5.5/km^{2}). There were 380 housing units at an average density of 7.7 per square mile (3.0/km^{2}). The racial makeup of the town was 96.6% White, 0.3% African American, 1.4% Native American, 0.6% Asian, and 1.1% from two or more races. Hispanic or Latino of any race were 0.8% of the population.

There were 298 households, of which 29.5% had children under the age of 18 living with them, 51.7% were married couples living together, 5.4% had a female householder with no husband present, 6.4% had a male householder with no wife present, and 36.6% were non-families. 29.2% of all households were made up of individuals, and 8.4% had someone living alone who was 65 years of age or older. The average household size was 2.38 and the average family size was 2.89.

The median age in the town was 42.8 years. 20.8% of residents were under the age of 18; 6.4% were between the ages of 18 and 24; 26.8% were from 25 to 44; 34% were from 45 to 64; and 12% were 65 years of age or older. The gender makeup of the town was 51.4% male and 48.6% female.

=== 2000 census ===
As of the census of 2000, there were 747 people, 286 households, and 197 families living in the town. The population density was 15.1 inhabitants per square mile (5.8/km^{2}). There were 349 housing units at an average density of 7.1 per square mile (2.7/km^{2}). The racial makeup of the town was 97.19% White, 0.13% African American, 0.54% Native American, 0.67% Asian, and 1.47% from two or more races. Hispanic or Latino of any race were 0.27% of the population.

There were 286 households, out of which 35.3% had children under the age of 18 living with them, 55.2% were married couples living together, 8.4% had a female householder with no husband present, and 31.1% were non-families. 25.9% of all households were made up of individuals, and 10.5% had someone living alone who was 65 years of age or older. The average household size was 2.61 and the average family size was 3.14.

In the town, the population was spread out, with 28.4% under the age of 18, 8.0% from 18 to 24, 33.9% from 25 to 44, 20.7% from 45 to 64, and 9.0% who were 65 years of age or older. The median age was 35 years. For every 100 females, there were 99.7 males. For every 100 females age 18 and over, there were 101.1 males.

The median income for a household in the town was $33,295, and the median income for a family was $42,159. Males had a median income of $31,193 versus $20,489 for females. The per capita income for the town was $13,743. About 11.9% of families and 17.0% of the population were below the poverty line, including 22.3% of those under age 18 and 34.7% of those age 65 or over.

== Notable person ==
- Abiather J. Knowles (1830–1905), awarded the Medal of Honor for his actions at the First Battle of Bull Run during the Civil War.
