= Maine State Route 212 =

State highway in Aroostook County, Maine, US

State Route 212

Route information
- Maintained by MaineDOT
- Length: 10.26 mi (16.51 km)

Major junctions
- West end: SR 11 in Moro Plantation
- East end: US 2 in Smyrna

Location
- Country: United States
- State: Maine
- Counties: Aroostook

Highway system
- Maine State Highway System; Interstate; US; State; Auto trails; Lettered highways
← SR 211	→ SR 213

State Route 212 (SR 212) is part of Maine's highway system, running from SR 11 in Moro Plantation to U.S. Route 2 (US 2) in Smyrna (within the community of Smyrna Mills), where a local road continues to serve the town of Oakfield. The route also provides access to the town of Merrill. SR 212 is 10.26 miles (16.51 km) long.

== Major junctions ==
The entire route is in Aroostook County.

Location	mi	km	Destinations	Notes
Moro Plantation	0.00	0.00	SR 11 (Aroostook Scenic Highway) – Patten, Ashland, Eagle Lake	
Smyrna	10.26	16.51	US 2 to Smyrna Oakfield Road / I-95 – Oakfield, Dyer Brook, Houlton	
1.000 mi = 1.609 km; 1.000 km = 0.621 mi
