= Southern Aroostook Community School =

Location
- 922 Dyer Brook Road; Dyer Brook, Aroostook County, Maine 04747; United States
- Coordinates: 46°05′12″N 68°11′04″W

Information
- School type: public
- Opened: 1976
- School district: Regional School Unit #50
- Superintendent: Jon Porter
- Principal: Jon Porter
- Grades: K–12
- Colors: Purple and White
- Song: On Wisconsin
- Mascot: Warrior
- Team name: Warriors
- Accreditation: New England Association of Schools and Colleges
- Communities served: Crystal Dyer Brook Hersey Island Falls Merrill Moro Plantation Mt. Chase Oakfield Patten Sherman Smyrna and Stacyville, Maine
- Website: Elementary School Middle/High School

Southern Aroostook Community School is a public k-12 school in Dyer Brook, Maine, United States. It serves the towns of Crystal, Dyer Brook, Island Falls, Merrill, Oakfield and Smyrna, Maine.

== History ==
After 25 years of work, Southern Aroostook Community School was built and opened in April 1976 at a cost of $3 million. It was intended to educate 750 students and employ 36 teachers as well as administration and support staff. The facility also includes a gymnasium which can accommodate 900 people and a modern library. Southern Aroostook's sports teams, Warriors and Lady Warriors play soccer, basketball, and baseball and softball. In 2018, the Lady Warriors high school basketball team competed for and won the Maine state Class D championship against the Vinalhaven Vikings. This was the school's first state championship title in 23 years.
