= Eaton W. Tarbell =

American architect

- Born: June 14, 1914; Merrill, Maine
- Died: April 3, 1992 (aged 77); Venice, Florida
- Occupation: Architect
- Practice: Eaton W. Tarbell & Associates

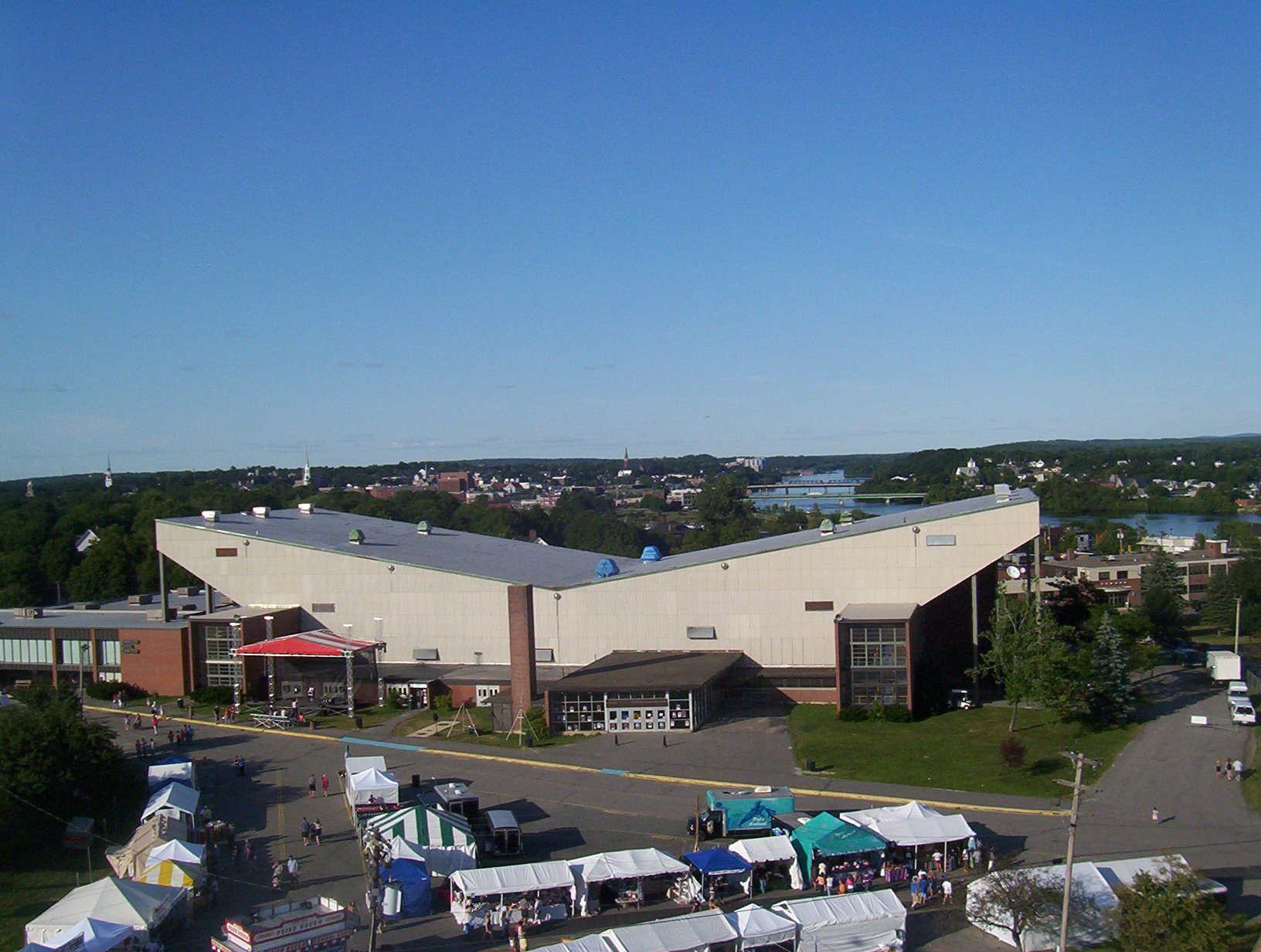
The former Bangor Auditorium, designed by Tarbell and completed in 1955. Demolished in 2013.

Eaton W. Tarbell AIA (1914–1992) was an American architect. A student of Walter Gropius, he is best known for introducing International Style architecture to Maine.

== Life and career ==
Eaton Weatherbee Tarbell was born June 14, 1914, in Merrill, Maine to Perley Hudson Tarbell, a potato farmer, and Caroline (Weatherbee) Tarbell. He was educated in the Bangor public schools and Deerfield Academy before attending Bowdoin College, from which he graduated in 1937. He then attended the Harvard Graduate School of Design, where he studied under Walter Gropius, a pioneer of modern architecture. After graduation in 1941 he worked for Boston engineers Stone & Webster and Bangor contractor T. W. Cunningham before establishing his own architecture firm, Eaton W. Tarbell & Associates, in Bangor in 1944. Several of his early works in Maine have been noted as the first examples of fully-developed International Style architecture in Maine. The first of these was a house in Hampden for Harold L. Tandy, a senior employee of T. W. Cunningham. This house, altered though still recognizable, adapted several features of Gropius' own house to local conditions.

Tarbell was a consistent advocate for modern architecture, and encouraged Maine institutions to abandon traditional revival styles in favor of it. He was active in the local architectural community, joining the American Institute of Architects in 1944 as part of the Maine chapter, and served as chapter secretary and president. In 1978 he suffered a setback when the new Waterville Junior High School, which he had designed and supervised, partially collapsed. His last major work was what is now the Collins Center for the Arts at the University of Maine in Orono, completed in 1986. He retired shortly thereafter.

== Personal life ==
Tarbell was married twice, first to Pauline Alwilda Graham in 1940 and second to Sallie (Wheeler) Downey in 1951. He had five children overall. Tarbell died April 3, 1992, in Venice, Florida. After his death his widow donated his architectural drawings to the Maine Historical Society.

== Architectural works ==
- Harold L. Tandy house, 403 Main Rd S, Hampden, Maine (1944, altered)
- Dryden Terrace, 48 College Ave, Bangor, Maine (1947–48)
- Vine Street School, 66 Vine St, Bangor, Maine (1950–51)
- South School, 30 Broadway, Rockland, Maine (1951)
- All Souls Congregational Church Arlan A. Baillie Building, 10 Broadway, Bangor, Maine (1953–54)
- Fruit Street School, 175 Fruit St, Bangor, Maine (1953)
- Bangor Auditorium 515 Main St, Bangor, Maine (1954–55, demolished 2013)
- Bangor Water District office building, 614 State St, Bangor, Maine (1959)
- Russell Peters house, 272 Kenduskeag Ave, Bangor, Maine (1959)
- East Grand School, 31 Houlton Rd, Danforth, Maine (1960)
- James A. Taylor Osteopathic Hospital (former), 268 Stillwater Ave, Bangor, Maine (1960, altered)
- Bangor High School, 885 Broadway, Bangor, Maine (1961–64)
- One Merchants Plaza, 1 Merchants Plz, Bangor, Maine (1972–73)
- Waterville Junior High School, 100 W River Rd, Waterville, Maine (1978)
- Collins Center for the Arts, University of Maine, Orono, Maine (1983–86)
