= List of killings by law enforcement officers in the United States, February 2015 =

This is a list of people reported killed by non-military law enforcement officers in the United States in February 2015, whether in the line of duty or not, and regardless of reason or method. The listing documents the occurrence of a death, making no implications regarding wrongdoing or justification on the part of the person killed or officer involved. Killings are arranged by date of the incident that caused death. Different death dates, if known, are noted in the description. The table below lists 83 people.

== February 2015 ==
Date	Name (Age) of Deceased	Race	State (City)	Description
2015-02-28	Thomas Allen Jr. (34)	Black	Missouri (Wellston)	When Allen attempted to drive away from a traffic stop, a Wellston police officer jumped partially into the car. The officer fired at Allen, who died of his injuries in hospital on March 1.
2015-02-28	Stephanie LeJean Hill (37)	White	Arizona (Ehrenberg)	Hill was one of two suspects in a Sonoma County, California, murder who were spotted in Indio, California. The pursuit on Interstate 10 east of Ehrenberg, Arizona, involved sheriff's deputies from Riverside County (California) and La Paz County (Arizona). During the foot pursuit after their car crashed, Hill pointed her weapon and was shot and killed by a Riverside County sheriff deputy.
2015-02-28	Cornelius J. Parker (28)	Black	Missouri (Columbia)	Deputies from Boone County Sheriffs Office were pursuing the vehicle of a suspect in a multiple homicide. When the vehicle ran off the road, Parker got out with a handgun and was killed in an exchange of gunfire with the deputies.
2015-02-28	Jessica Uribe (28)	Hispanic	Arizona (Tucson)	Uribe, whose sister said she has a mental condition, was the subject of a suspicious woman report. When a Tucson Police officer responded to check on her they got into a confrontation. When Uribe moved toward the officer holding a knife, the officer shot her. She died at a medical facility the next day.
2015-02-28	Deven Guilford (17)	White	Michigan (Grand Ledge)	Guilford was pulled over for flashing his brights at an Eaton County sheriff's deputy and then shot seven times and killed by the sheriff deputy who made the stop. Family of Slain Teen Deven Guilford Sues Eaton County Cop After Roadside Killing. "Deven's tragic and totally unnecessary death represents a disturbing trend of demanding 100 percent compliance with police authority, coupled with zero tolerance of risk of harm to police officers," lawyer Cynthia Heenan said in a statement. "Whatever happened to protect and serve?""
2015-02-28	Ian Sherrod (40)	Black	North Carolina (Tarboro)	Police responded to a tip on the whereabouts of a suspect in three earlier fatal shootings. They found Sherrod in a truck displaying a gun. Refusing to surrender, he got out of his truck and pointed his gun at officers, who shot and killed him.
2015-02-28	Chazsten Noah Freeman (24)	White	South Carolina (Pelzer)	A deputy from the Greenville County Sheriff's Office shot and killed Chaszten, a robbery suspect, who had shot at them from a wooded area near Highway 8 as they searched.
2015-02-27	Ernesto Javier Canepa Diaz (27)	Hispanic	California (Santa Ana)	Police identified a man and the vehicle he was in as the suspect and vehicle involved in a robbery. Early reports lack detail, but "something happened" as police tried to contact him, and they shot and killed him. The Mexican government identified the man as Ernesto Javier Canepa Diaz, a Mexican citizen.
2015-02-26	Amilcar Perez-Lopez (21)	Hispanic	California (San Francisco)	Police responded to a call of a man chasing another man down the street and/or having allegedly robbed a cyclist at knifepoint. Lopez was found holding a knife. He allegedly lunged at the plain-clothed officers with knife overhead and officers shot and killed him. However, this version of events is disputed in a wrongful death lawsuit by a coroner's report revealing all six shots hit Lopez from behind.
2015-02-26	Crystal Lee Miley Harry (34)	White	Georgia (Sylvester)	A pursuit by Worth County Sheriff Deputies led to the crash of the car Worth was in. She got out of the car pointing a pistol at deputies, who then shot and killed her.
2015-02-26	Rodney Dewayne Biggs (49)	White	Mississippi (Gulfport)	Gulfport Police officers responding to a single vehicle crash found Biggs in the vehicle. Police say when they instructed him to get out of the vehicle he reached for a firearm. An officer shot and killed him. The Harrison County Grand Jury found no wrongdoing in the shooting.
2015-02-26	David Cuevas (42)	Hispanic	Florida (Lakeland)	Cuevas was wanted on sexual battery charges so when he texted his girlfriend, she called Lakeland Police. They used her phone to impersonate her in text messages, setting up a meeting with Cuevas. When they met him in a parking lot he went for his gun and was fatally shot by police officers.
2015-02-25	Francis “Frank” Lamantia Spivey (43)	White	Nevada (Las Vegas)	The man brandished a rifle, fired into the air, and then fired into an apartment police say they thought was occupied, at which point a SWAT sniper shot and killed the man.
2015-02-25	Alexander Phillip Long (31)	White	Indiana (Terre Haute)	Terre Haute Police officers spotted Long's car and attempted to arrest him on a warrant. They used their vehicles to pin in his vehicle but he rammed the police cars. An officer used his Taser but could not control Long. Police say he failed to obey commands to show his hands and then reached inside his jacket. That's when an officer shot him in the chest. Long died later at a hospital.
2015-02-25	Glenn C. Lewis (27)	Black	Oklahoma (Oklahoma City)	Oklahoma City Police pursued a vehicle which did not pull over for an early morning traffic stop. The driver went into a dead-end street and had to stop. After the officers got out of their cars and walked toward the stopped vehicle the driver turned around and drove toward the officers. They shot at the car but it went past them and crashed about a block away. Lewis, the driver had been hit several times and was dead at the scene.
2015-02-25	Robertson, Troy Austin (21)		Texas (Houston)	Harris County Sheriff Deputies responded to a domestic disturbance between a father and son. The psychologically troubled son had taken a rifle and left the house. Eventually the deputies found Robertson hiding, with a rifle, behind an air conditioning unit in the backyard. According to a Sheriff's Department spokesman the deputy ordered Robertson to drop the rifle. When he came back up pointing the rifle at the deputy, the deputy shot and mortally wounded him. Robertson died at a hospital.
2015-02-24	Biegert, Joseph (30)		Wisconsin (Green Bay)	Police responded to a call about a possibly suicidal man. He stabbed an officer in the arm. The wounded officer and his partner fired, killing the man.
2015-02-23	Smashey, Michael Wayne (37)		Georgia (Powder Springs)	Smashey was wanted on a warrant for armed robbery and deputies from the Sheriffs' Departments of Cobb County and Paulding County, along with U.S. Marshalls, went to his girlfriends house to try to serve the warrant. He was hiding in a crawl space and officials say he was shot and killed when he tried to stab the deputies as they pulled insulation off him.
2015-02-23	A'Donte Washington (16)	Black	Alabama (Millbrook)	Millbrook Police officers responding to a report of a possible burglary found Washington and four other young men at the residence. The police took one into custody and others fired weapons. Washington retreated back into the house and fired again. Police say when Washington went into the backyard and then toward the street brandishing a weapon, he encountered an officer who shot and killed him.
2015-02-23	Robert Kohl (47)	White	Louisiana (Denham Springs)	Kolh's mother had called the Denham Springs Police Department telling them he was suicidal. Officers say that when they found Kohl he took out a gun and pointed it towards them. A police officer shot and kill Kohl.
2015-02-23	Daniel A. Elrod (39)	White	Nebraska (Omaha)	Police responding to a reported robbery engaged Elrod. Accounts of the interaction vary, but officer Alvin Lugod shot and killed the apparently unarmed Elrod. A grand jury reviewed the case but found no reason to charge the officer.
2015-02-23	Jerome Nichols (42)	White	Pennsylvania (Allentown)	A woman who had been stabbed called police reporting that the man had fled. She named and described the man and his vehicle. Two Catasauqua Police officers and a Pennsylvania State Police found chased the vehicle. In the final confrontation Nichols stabbed one officer before the other two shot and killed him.
2015-02-22	Calvon A. Reid (39)	Black	Florida (Coconut Creek)	Paramedics dealing with a man they described as "agitated, incoherent, and combative" who was found in a gated residential community, called for police assistance. When police arrived they used their tasers on Reid. After being tased, Reid was transported to a nearby hospital where he died on 24 February.
2015-02-22	Bradford Samuel Leonard (50)	White	Florida (Palm Bay)	Police responded to an early-morning 911 hang-up call. When they arrived, Leonard reportedly walked into his driveway, aimed a gun at an officer, and opened fire. Officer Derek Hollcroft opened fire, killing Leonard.
2015-02-22	Anthony Giaquinta (41)	White	Georgia (Clarkesville)	Habersham County Sheriff Joey Terrell and two deputies responded to a domestic disturbance call and found a woman later identified as Kathy Giaguinta, Anthony's former wife, shot dead in her garage. While they were investigating Anthony Giaquinta (a former sheriff's office employee) returned to his ex-wife's residence and was killed in a shoot-out with deputies. Later they found the body of Steve Singleton, 45, near the home. Sheriff Terrell and one of the deputies were injured and were treated at a local hospital.
2015-02-21	Kent Norman (51)	White	Indiana (Indianapolis)	Indianapolis Metropolitan Police Department officers responding to a 911 call found Norman holding a knife. They felt threatened and shot and killed him. Norman had allegedly been attempting to kill his mother.
2015-02-21	Chance Dale Thompson (35)	White	California (Marysville)	Yuba County Sheriff deputies responded to a 2 a.m. call from a security guard at an aggregate plant about a trespasser. Deputies found the man walking atop a retaining wall, punching and kicking the air. Deputies used their tasers to gain control of Thompson so they could handcuff him. He went into cardiac arrest and died at a hospital.
2015-02-21	Jason Moncrief Carter (41)	White	New Mexico (Ruidoso)	New Mexico State Police attempting to arrest Carter on a warrant surrounded him in his trailer in a rural RV park. There was an all-night standoff during which he brandished a firearm. When he threatened officers with the firearm they shot into his trailer, killing him.
2015-02-20	Ruben Garcia Villalpando (31)	Hispanic	Texas (Grapevine)	Villalpando, a Mexican immigrant, was shot and killed by Grapevine police officer Robert Clark. Clark engaged him in a high-speed chase after responding to a burglary alarm at a business. According to the Star-Telegram, "The driver, later identified as Garcia, got out of his pickup, put his hands up and walked toward Clark's patrol car despite the officer's calls to halt.... Two shots rang out, and Garcia slumped over. He was pronounced dead at 12:06 a.m. at John Peter Smith Hospital in Fort Worth, according to the Tarrant County medical examiner's office[.]"
2015-02-20	Alejandro Salazar	Hispanic	Texas (Houston)	Officers from the United States Marshals Service and the Texas Department of Criminal Justice were staking out a residence looking for a wanted felon. They followed a vehicle from the residence until it stopped in a parking lot, then approached the vehicle as the driver got out. The suspect exited the vehicle with a weapon drawn and the officers shot and killed him The suspect was identified by a Marshalls Service spokesman as Alejandro Salazar
2015-02-20	Terry Price (41)	Black	Oklahoma (Tulsa)	Price returned to an Osage Nation casino after he was banned from the premises so tribal authorities called for help from Osage County Sheriffs deputies. Price had left the casino by the time deputies arrived, but he returned while they were there and deputies along with tribal police chased him. A tribal officer used his stun gun. After being handcuffed, Price collapsed and was declared dead at a local hospital.
2015-02-20	Douglas Harris (77)	Black	Alabama (Birmingham)	A Birmingham Police officer and a firefighter went to Harris's apartment at the request of a relative to make a welfare check. Police say that when Harris came to the door he had a weapon in his hand pointed at the officer. The officer shot twice, mortally wounding Harris who died March 27.
2015-02-20	Stanley Lamar Grant (38)	Black	Alabama (Homewood)	Shot and killed after allegedly firing at officers serving a search warrant.
2015-02-18	Janisha Fonville (20)	Black	North Carolina (Charlotte)	Janisha Fonville refused to drop a knife during a domestic incident, she was shot and killed.
2015-02-17	Michael Steven Ireland (31)	White	Missouri (Springfield)	Michael Steven Ireland was shot and killed after a foot chase. He appeared to be unarmed.
2015-02-17	Douglas Sparks (30)	White	Massachusetts (Tewksbury)	Man fatally shot after allegedly stabbing and slashing two people in the parking lot of school.
2015-02-17	Matthew Lundy (32)	White	Michigan (Eaton Rapids Township)	Eaton County Sheriffs Deputies responding to the scene of a car in the ditch found Lundy in the vehicle. Officials say that as the deputies approached they saw Lundy draw a weapon from his pocket and point it at a deputy. The other deputy fired nine times, killing Lundy.
2015-02-17	Betty Diane Sexton (43)	White	North Carolina (Gastonia)	Gastonia Police Officers responded to a domestic disturbance call at Sexton's home. A State Bureau of Investigation agent said that officers entered the home, discussed the matter with her, and were about to leave when Sexton went into another room and came out with a long gun. She refused orders to drop the gun and a police officer shot her in the chest. She died later in a hospital.
2015-02-17	Pedro "Pete" Juan Saldivar (50)	Hispanic	Texas (Del Rio)	Saldivar was driving a commercial vehicle and police tried to make contact after reports of him driving recklessly. He refused to stop and several deputies opened fire, there is a video of the incident.
2015-02-16	Daniel Lawrence Caldwell (56)	White	Arizona (Marana)	Shot and killed after he was seen raising a handgun at officers.
2015-02-16	Michael K. Casper (26)	White	Idaho (Boise)	Boise Police officers responded to reports of a disturbance about 1:20 am and heard gunshots as they neared the scene. Casper was seen inside the residence holding a rifle or shotgun. Police say Casper did not obey orders to drop the weapon and as he pointed it one of the officers, the other officer fired eight times, killing him.
2015-02-15	Lavall Hall (25)	Black	Florida (Miami Gardens)	Hall's mother called police when her schizophrenic son went into a violent rage. When the Miami Gardens police officers arrived, Hall threatened them with a broomstick, hitting one officer. Both officers used their tasers to little effect, then shot and killed Hall.
2015-02-15	Howard Brent Means Jr. (34)	White	Mississippi (Iuka)	Starting with an attempted traffic stop, two Iuka Police Officers followed Means to a WalMart where he got out of his car and entered the store. Means was armed with a shotgun and in the store he exchanged gunfire with the officers who shot and killed him.
2015-02-15	Bruce Lee Steward (34)	White	Oregon (Colton)	Clackamas County Sheriff's deputies responded to a 911 hangup call reporting a stabbing and a man with a gun. When they arrived they found Steward, armed with a hatchet. He came at the deputies, refusing to drop the hatchet. They shot and killed him. The death was ruled a suicide.
2015-02-15	Cody Evans (24)	White	Utah (Provo)	Shot and killed after pointing an Airsoft rifle (with orange tip removed) at police, during response to domestic violence call.
2015-02-14	Roy Joe Day (51)	White	Texas (Laredo)	A Laredo Police officer pulled over Day for a routine traffic stop. Police report that as the officer went to frisk him, Day pulled out a weapon and shot at the officer. According to police reports Day fired four shots, all missing the officer; the officer fired seven times, striking Day three times. Day later died in a hospital.
2015-02-13	Matthew D. Belk (27)	White	Tennessee (McLemoresville)	Carroll County Sheriffs deputies were searching for Belk in connection with a domestic violence call earlier in the evening. The Tennessee Bureau of Investigation says that when deputies stopped his car he got out with a gun in his hand. Officers shot and killed him.
2015-02-13	Richard Carlin (35)	Hispanic	Pennsylvania (Reading)	Arizona fugitive Carlin was shot and killed by a Pennsylvania State Police trooper who was assisting Berks County detectives in serving an arrest warrant for several charges, including aggravated assault with a deadly weapon.
2015-02-13	Andres D. Lara-Rodriguez (21)	Hispanic	Kansas (Kansas City)	Lara-Rodriguez carjacked a driver at gunpoint and then used the stolen vehicle to lead the police in a high-speed chase. When he crashed he "presented a gun" according to police. Four officer shot and killed him.
2015-02-13	Daniel Mejia (37)	Hispanic	Arizona (San Manuel)	A Pinal County Sheriff deputy responded to a report of a suspicious person and encountered Mejia near a market with a knife in his hand. The deputy told Mejia to drop the knife but instead Mejia walked toward the deputy. The deputy drew his weapon and repeated his warning and when Mejia failed to comply, he shot and killed Mejia. Family members told deputies that Mejia suffers from mental illness and that he always carries knives.
2015-02-13	Jonathan Larry Harden (23)	White	California (San Bernardino)	San Bernardino Police Officers pursued a car reported as stolen. The suspect drove on to the 215 Freeway, crashed into several vehicles, and got turned around, facing south in the northbound lanes. Several officers were able to surround the stolen car and they got out with weapons drawn Police say the driver attempted to ram the officers. They shot and killed him.
2015-02-11	Phillip Watkins (23)	Black	California (San Jose)	Watkins was shot by two police officers after allegedly charging at them with a knife.
2015-02-11	Fletcher Ray Stewart (46)	White	Alabama (Dadeville)	Deputies from the Tallapoosa County Sheriffs Office responded to a call that the subject was walking along a road waving a pistol. When a deputy arrived and made contact with Stewart, he ran into the adjoining woods. The Sheriff said that he confronted the deputy and brandished the weapon and the deputy shot him.
2015-02-10	Brian P. Fritze (45)	White	Colorado (Glenwood Springs)	After a domestic violence incident Deputies from Glenwood County Sheriffs Office found and pursued suspect Fritze in a high-speed chase. When Fritze ran over spike strips and stopped he exited a vehicle holding a gun to his head. When he failed to follow deputies' orders one or both of them shot and killed him.
2015-02-10	Anthony Bess (49)	Black	Tennessee (Memphis)	Two officers from the Memphis Police Department went to Bess's home to serve a warrant for aggravated assault. When the officers confronted Bess he pointed a gun at them. An officer shot and killed Bess.
2015-02-10	Kenneth Kreyssig (61)	White	Maine (Smyrna Mills)	Officers from the Aroostook County Sheriff's Office and the Maine State Police went to the home Kreyssig shared with his mother when his brother called to report he was suicidal. In the encounter which followed Kreyssig fired at the officers and he was shot dead. The Maine Attorney General later ruled the officers had acted in self-defense.
2015-02-10	Antonio Zambrano-Montes (35)	Hispanic	Washington (Pasco)	Shooting of Antonio Zambrano-Montes. Zambrano was throwing rocks at cars and officers during the incident. As he was shot, Zambrano appeared to be unarmed and did not have a rock in his hands as he was fired on by three police officers. The shooting lead to mass protests in Pasco and a response from the Mexican government, condemning the shooting.
2015-02-09	Desmond Luster Sr. (45)	Black	Texas (Dallas)	Luster, in his pickup was chasing two youths running on foot whom he believed had stolen from him. Aaron Tolerton, an off-duty Dallas Police officer acting as a security guard thought Luster was driving toward him, so he shot and killed Luster. Luster's family has filed a lawsuit.
2015-02-09	Larry Hostetter (41)	White	Texas (Nocona)	Police responded to a disturbance at Hostetter's residence. During the call, the officer shot Hostetter, an off duty Montague County deputy, who was pronounced dead an hour later.
2015-02-08	Sawyer Flache (27)	White	Texas (Austin)	Austin Police had received calls about Flache walking down the street shooting streelights with a rifle. A police helicopter responded and when Flache shot at officers on the ground and at the helicopter, a police sniper shot and killed Flache.
2015-02-08	Vincent Cordaro (57)	White	New York (New City)	Clarkstown Police responded to a call from Cordaro's family members about him being armed, intoxicated, and agitated. Police surrounded the property and Cordaro shot at them with his rifle. Eventually an officer shot and killed Cordaro.
2015-02-08	John Martin Whittaker (33)	Hispanic	Alaska (Anchorage)	Anchorage Police received reports of an erratic and dangerous driver and pursued Whittaker on city streets. He eventually stopped, got out of his vehicle, and exchanged gunfire with the officers. A running gun battle ensued, with the officers pursuing on foot. They shot and killed him in an alley.
2015-02-08	Joseph Paffen (46)	Black	Florida (Orlando)	Deputies from the Orange County Sheriffs Department responded to a call from a woman who had a domestic injunction against Paffen. Paffen had called her to meet him at a Publix market. Because the woman had called authorities, four deputies went instead. When they arrived at the meeting place Paffen shot at them while they were in their vehicle, injuring two of them. The other deputies returned fire, killing Paffen.
2015-02-07	James Howard Allen (74)	Black	North Carolina (Gastonia)	Allen's family asked Gastonia police for a welfare check because he had recently undergone heart surgery. Their 10:20 p.m. knock on the door went unanswered. Police officers returned at 11:30 p.m. with staff from the fire department and were able to force the back door open. Officer Josh Lefevers encountered Allen, seated, holding a gun which police say was pointed in their direction. When Allen failed to comply with orders to drop the gun, a police officer shot and killed him.
2015-02-06	Herbert Hill (25)	Black	Oklahoma (Oklahoma City)	Herbert Hill was killed after he shot and injured an officer trying to arrest him.
2015-02-06	Jimmy Ray Robinson Jr. (51)	Black	Texas (Waco)	Jimmy Ray Robinson Jr was killed after a high-speed chase on Interstate 35.
2015-02-05	John Sawyer (26)	White	California (Calimesa)	John Sawyer was killed when he picked up what turned out to be a replica handgun after ignoring police commands.
2015-02-04	Wilber Castillo-Gongora (35)	Hispanic	Texas (Wichita Falls)	Wilber Castillo Gongora was tased by deputies on February 3rd and died on February 4th.
2015-02-04	Salvador Muna (28)	Hispanic	Arizona (Tempe)	Salvador Muna was being tracked by the U.S. Marshals fugitive task force when he allegedly raised a gun at deputies, he and the driver of the vehicle he was passenger in were shot and killed.
2015-02-04	Joaquin Hernandez (28)	Hispanic	Arizona (Tempe)	Joaquin Hernandez was shot and killed, he had a fugitive being tracked by the U.S. Marshals fugitive task force in the vehicle who was killed as well.
2015-02-04	Jeremy Lett (28)	Black	Florida (Tallahassee)	Jeremy Lett was shot and killed by Officer David Stith who was responding to a robbery call.
2015-02-04	Markell Atkins (36)	Black	Tennessee (Memphis)	Markell Atkins threatened U.S. Marshal and task force agents with a knife and was shot and killed, he was wanted in connection with an incident in which he is accused of killing a 1-year-old child of his girlfriends he was babysitting in March 2014.
2015-02-04	Paul Alfred Eugene Johnson (59)	White	California (Corona)	Paul Alfred Eugene Johnson was being tracked after he robbed a bank and was unknowingly given a tracking device. At the end of the chase he was shot and died at the scene.
2015-02-04	Anthony Purvis (45)	White	Georgia (Douglas)	Purvis was shot by officer Joseph Brackett who was responding to a shooting.
2015-02-04	Izzy Colon (37)	Hispanic	Florida (Orlando)	Izzy Colon was shot and killed after two undercover officers conducting a follow-up investigation saw him and another man openly firing guns.
2015-02-03	Yuvette Henderson (38)	Black	California (Emeryville)	Yuvette Henderson was shot and killed after, according to police statements, she tried to carjack at least 3 people and pointed a gun at a security guard at a home depot store.
2015-02-03	Natasha McKenna (37)		Virginia (Alexandria)	Mentally ill McKenna was being held in the Fairfax County Jail on allegations of assaulting a law enforcement officer. While restrained with handcuffs behind her back, shackled legs, and a mask, she was tasered four times by a sheriff's deputy because she wouldn't bend her knees to be put into a wheeled restraint chair. Six members of the Sheriff's Emergency Response Team, dressed in full-body biohazard suits and gas masks, were there at the time. Shortly thereafter, she suffered cardiac arrest, and was resuscitated on the way to the hospital, but was removed from life support and died Feb. 8.
2015-02-03	Dewayne Deshawn Ward Jr. (29)	Black	California (Antioch)	Dewayne Ward Jr. was killed in a hail of bullets after he charged officers with a knife in his hand.
2015-02-03	Ledarius D. Williams (23)	Black	Missouri (St. Louis)	Ledarius Williams was shot and killed after police say he produced a gun while having an altercation with police officers.
2015-02-02	Trieu, Hung		Texas (Houston)	Under investigation. First stories are saying, that a man was shooting into a bar and an officer who was at the business shot back at him and killed him.
2015-02-02	Jacob M. Haglund (17)	White	Michigan (Bay City)	A Bay City Police officer Brandon C. Murphy, responding to a reported home invasion about 1:30 am, tracked Haglund's footprints in the snow and encountered him about a block away. Haglund did not obey Murphy's orders, but shot at him, hitting him in the thigh. Murphy returned fire, hitting Haglund several times. Haglund died February 15 after being taken off life support.
2015-02-02	David Kassick (59)	White	Pennsylvania (Hummelstown)	A man was shot by an officer during a traffic stop, incident is still under investigation. In March 2015, officer Lisa Mearkle was charged with criminal homicide in the shooting and was released on $250,000 bail.
2015-02-02	Francis Murphy Rose III (42)	White	California (Apple Valley)	A man who was allegedly shooting a gun near a home was killed. The San Bernardino County District Attorney's Office found the shooting to be justified.

== See also ==
- Death in custody § United States
- Henry A. Wallace Police Crime Public Database
- List of cases of police brutality
- List of countries with annual rates and counts for killings by law enforcement officers
- List of law enforcement officers killed in the line of duty in the United States
- List of law enforcement officers convicted for an on-duty killing in the United States
- List of police reforms related to the George Floyd protests
- List of unarmed African Americans killed by law enforcement officers in the United States
- Lists of killings by law enforcement officers
- Police brutality in the United States
- Police misconduct § United States
- Police riot § United States
- Police use of deadly force in the United States
