= Bangor Civic Center =

Coordinates: 44°47′23.08″N 68°46′48.59″W

The Bangor Civic Center was a convention center located in Bangor, Maine. It contained 22,000 square feet (2,000 m^{2}) of exhibit and meeting space, enough for 9 meetings at the same time. In addition to meetings, it could also host trade shows, wedding receptions, and banquets.

It could seat up to 1,200 in the main hall. An adjacent lecture room could hold up to 200 people, while the mezzanine could hold 150 people.

The Civic Center was part of the same complex as the Bangor Auditorium.

The two buildings began to be demolished on June 3, 2013, as they were replaced by the newly built Cross Insurance Center.
