= Maine Windjammers =

- League: CBA
- Founded: 1985
- Dissolved: 1986
- Arena: Bangor Auditorium
- Location: Bangor, Maine
- Team colors: red, white, blue

The Maine Windjammers were a professional basketball team based out of Bangor, Maine, playing home games at the Bangor Auditorium. It was affiliated with the Continental Basketball Association (CBA). It existed during the CBA's 1985–86 season. After that season, the team was dropped, and it would be a decade before a basketball team would return to Maine, with the Portland Wave, a team in the USBL.
