= Hudson Museum =

- Established: 1986
- Location: Orono, Maine, United States
- Coordinates: 44.899652°N 68.666262°W
- Type: Anthropology museum
- Director: Gretchen F. Faulkner
- Public transit access: UMaine Memorial Union, BAT Community Connector
- Website: www.umaine.edu/hudsonmuseum

The Hudson Museum is an anthropology museum that is operated by the University of Maine and is located in the Collins Center for the Arts in Orono, Maine. The museum's collections include Maine Native American baskets and basket-making tools, Precolumbian ceramics, weapons and gold work, and baskets, jewelry, ceramics, textiles, clothing, tools, weapons and contemporary art from Native American peoples around the United States and the Arctic area.
