= Oakfield station =

- Oakfield Station
- U.S. National Register of Historic Places
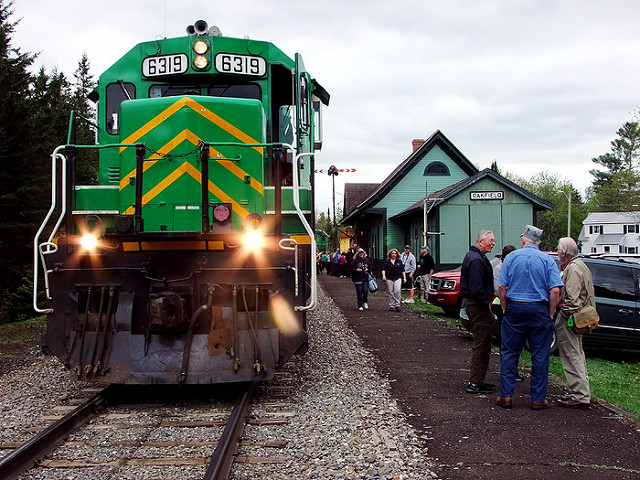

- Location within Maine Location within the United States
- Location: Station Street, Oakfield, Maine
- Coordinates: 46°5′52″N 68°9′21″W
- Area: less than one acre
- Built: 1911
- NRHP reference No.: 87000928
- Added to NRHP: June 25, 1987

Oakfield Station is a historic former passenger rail station on Station Street in Oakfield, Maine. The station was built in 1911 by the Bangor and Aroostook Railroad, and is a major reminder of Oakfield's onetime importance as a railroad center. The station is home to the Oakfield Railroad Museum which is operated by the Oakfield Historical Society. It was listed on the National Register of Historic Places on June 25, 1987.

== Description and history ==
Oakfield Station is located adjacent to the railroad tracks formerly of the Bangor and Aroostook Railroad, at the end of Station Street, south of the town's rural village center. It is a single-story wood-frame structure, nine bays in length and a single room deep, set on a modern concrete foundation. It has a gable-on-hip roof, where there are half-round windows and exposed rafters in the gable ends. The main facade faces southeast toward the track, with an off-center projecting bay topped by a gable with bracketed eave and lunette window. This projection has two sash windows on its main wall, and narrow sash windows on its sides. A pair of doorways are located east of the bay, along with some windows. The main roof has deep eaves with long thin brackets, and breezeway connects the main building to a tool shed. The interior is divided into three rooms, two of which retain original pressed tin paneling on the walls.

The station was built in 1911 by the Bangor and Aroostook Railroad, and served as a passenger depot until rail service was discontinued on the line in 1961. It was moved about 100 yards (91 m) from its original location in 1941 to accommodate changes in a local grade crossing. The building was given to the Oakfield Historical Society in 1986, and has undergone restoration and adaptation for use as a museum.

== See also ==
- National Register of Historic Places listings in Aroostook County, Maine
