= Bangor Auditorium =

Former sports arena in Bangor, Maine

Coordinates: 44°47′23.08″N 68°46′48.59″W

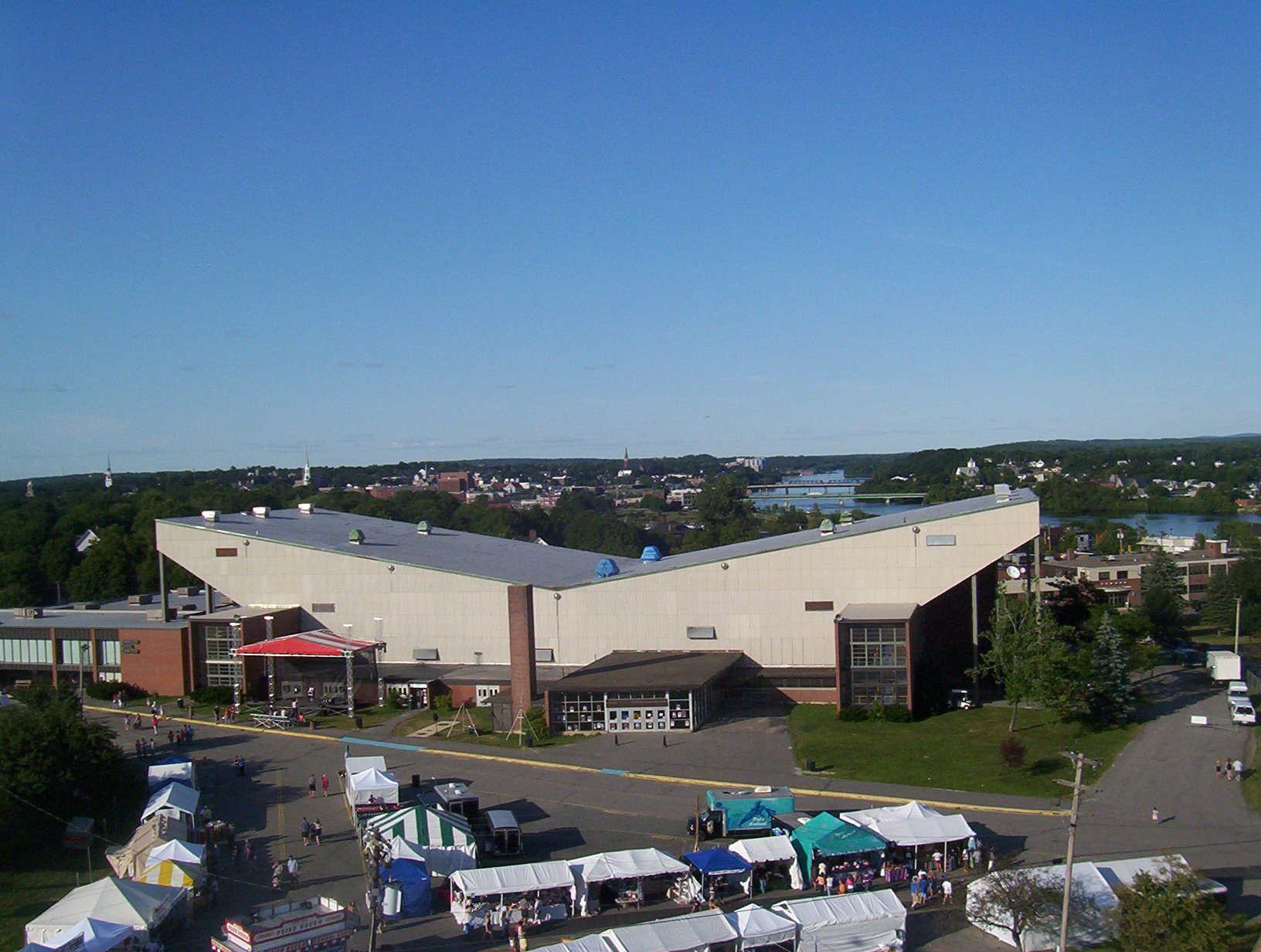
Bangor Auditorium from Bass Park in 2007.

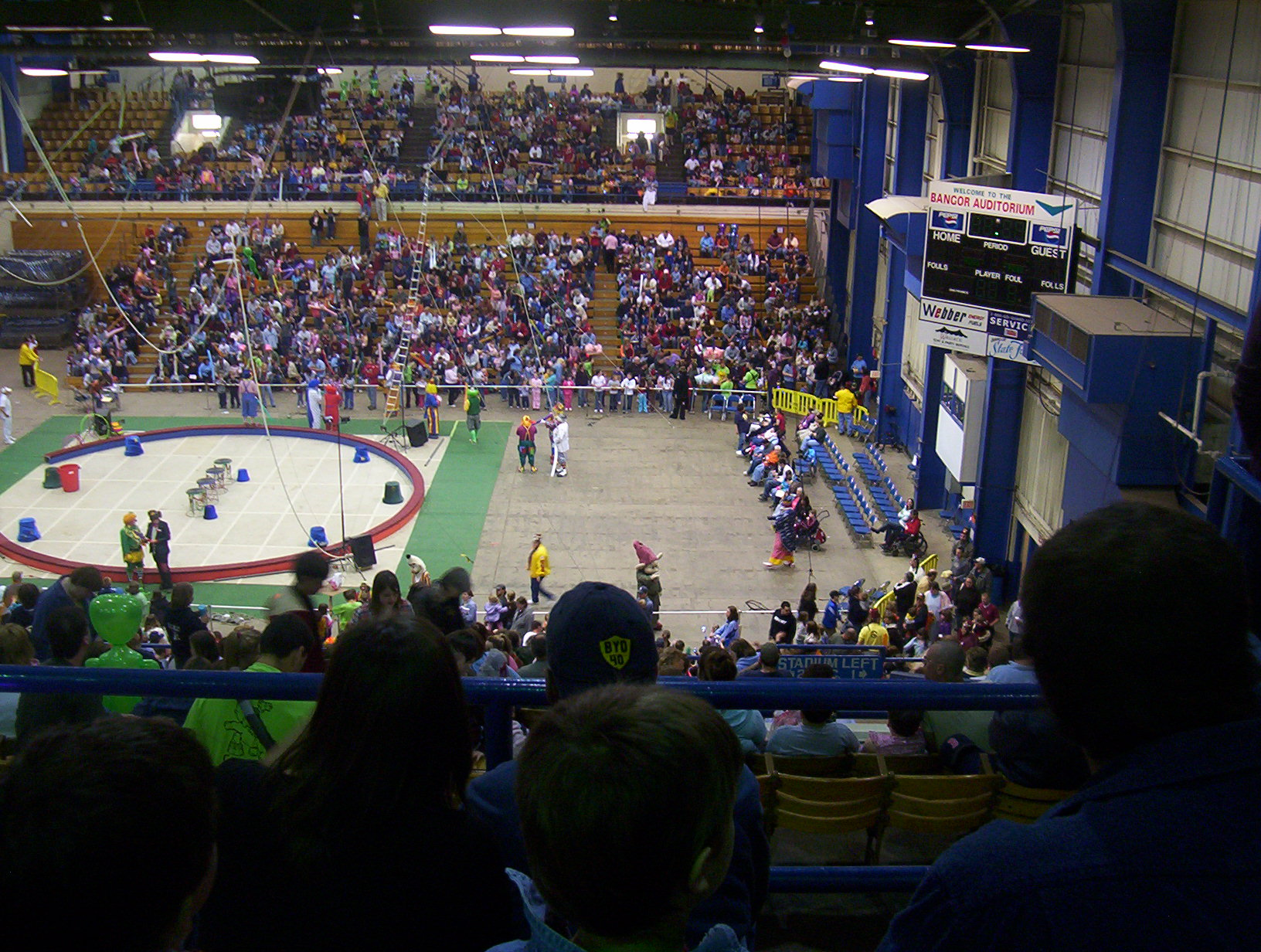
Interior of Auditorium, set up for the Shrine Circus in 2007.

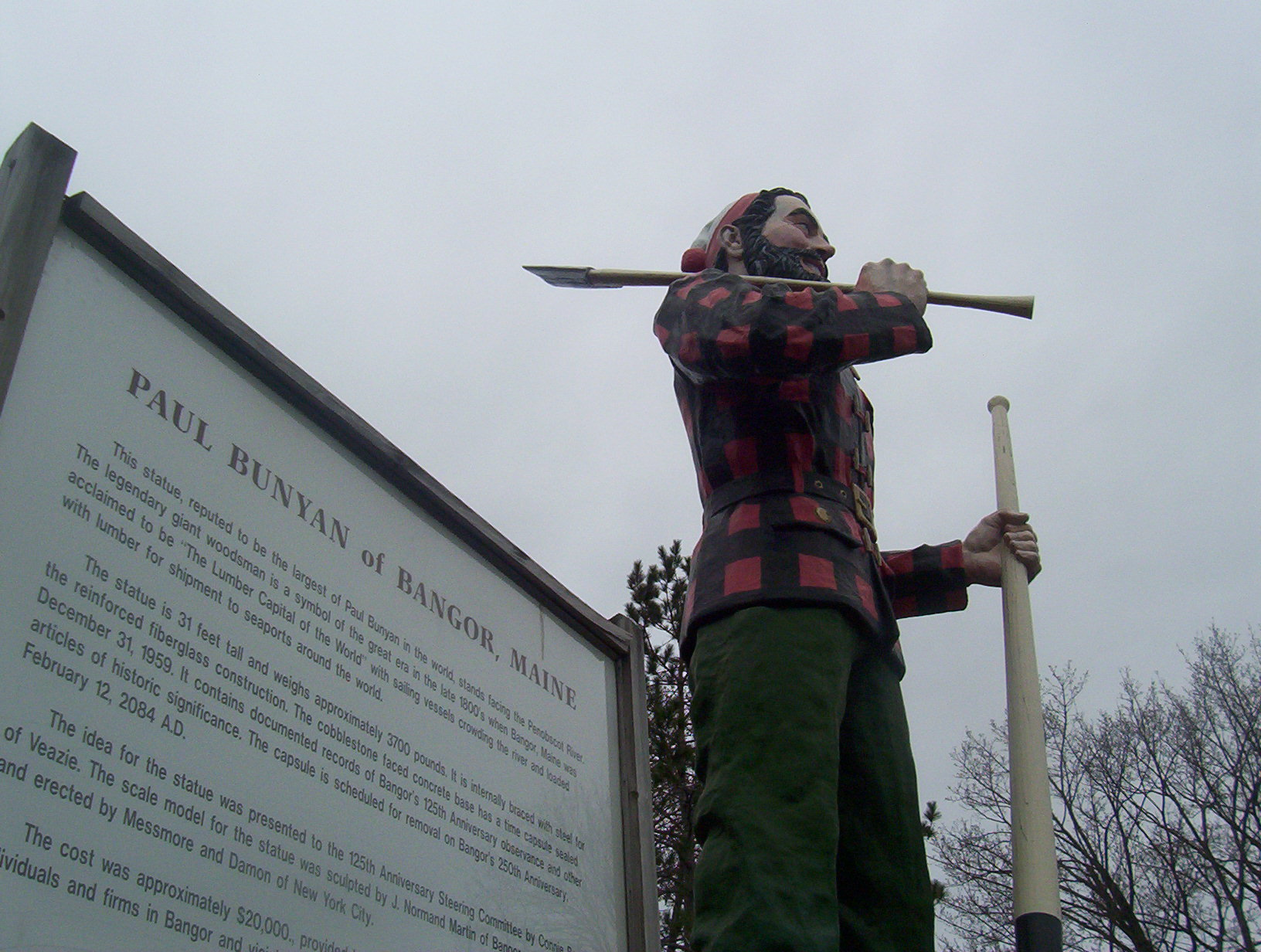
The Paul Bunyan statue in 2007, still extant as part of the new arena.

The Bangor Auditorium was a 5,948-seat multi-purpose arena located in downtown Bangor, Maine.

== History ==
Construction of the Bangor Auditorium began in early 1955, after the city of Bangor, Maine hired architect Eaton Tarbell to design the facility. The auditorium opened its doors to the public for the first time on October 1, 1955 with a maximum capacity of 7,426.

The auditorium shared the same complex as the Bangor Civic Center, and was mainly used for concerts, sporting events, circus performances, political rallies, as well as trade shows with 16,000 square feet (1500 m^{2}) of space.

During its years of operation, the auditorium hosted several notable politicians, musicians, and other people of note, including: Barack Obama, Jimmy Carter, Bob Dylan, Kiss, Aerosmith, Garth Brooks, Willie Nelson, the WWE, and others.

It was demolished in 2013. For decades, the auditorium was a hub for youth and men's basketball competitions. It hosted the Maine Principals' Association basketball tournament each February, as well as the graduation ceremonies for Bangor High School in June. It also served as the home of the Maine Windjammers of the Continental Basketball Association, and the University of Maine men's and women's basketball teams for a few seasons until 1992. The V-shape style of the building gave it the look of giant wings and adds to the atmosphere. A statue of Paul Bunyan towered outside as a symbol of the city's prosperous history as a lumber port in the early-to-mid-19th century.

The auditorium and civic center shared its campus with Bass Park, home of the Bangor State Fair as well as Bangor Raceway, one of the oldest harness racing facilities in New England. Bangor Auditorium has hosted many major musical acts and has been a stop for World Wrestling Entertainment house shows for many years.

== Replacement ==
Over the course of a few years, the city discussed significantly renovating or replacing the aging auditorium with a state-of-the-art venue. Poor ventilation and HVAC systems as well as substandard handicap accessibility have been cited as primary reasons for this.

In 2009 the city consulted with Sink Combs Dethlefs, Denver architects, and others to discuss the construction of a $51 million, 5,000-seat arena adjacent to the existing structure. Their proposal suggested using the new 160,000-square-foot (15,000 m^{2}) facility as the centerpiece of the complex, while renovating the existing auditorium and the Bangor Civic Center for smaller events at an additional cost of $18 million.

After a May 2011 public referendum in which Bangor voters supported building new facilities by a margin of 3 to 1, the plan now moved forward to build an entirely new set of primary buildings at Bass Park to replace the existing Bangor Auditorium and Civic Center with new structures, while leaving the old buildings open almost until the new buildings opened. The Bangor Auditorium was demolished in 2013 with the new arena completed.

The new arena, officially the Cross Insurance Center, has varying maximum seating depending on the configuration that is used. For events that use the main floor for performance there are 5,800 fixed seats. For events using an end stage of 60 feet by 40 feet the new arena will seat as many as 8,050 persons. The new facility is managed by Global Spectrum, a division of Comcast.
