= Death of Natasha McKenna =

2015 death in police custody

Natasha McKenna
- Born: Natasha J. C. McKenna; January 9, 1978
- Died: February 8, 2015 (aged 37); Alexandria, Virginia, U.S.
- Cause of death: Cardiac arrest Excited delirium
- Children: 1

Natasha J. C. McKenna (January 9, 1978 – February 8, 2015) was a 37-year-old African-American woman who died in Fairfax County, Virginia while in police custody. The catalyst event, extraction from her cell and being tasered while shackled, was captured on the video of the Fairfax County jail.

During a team's efforts to extract the mentally ill prisoner, who resisted, they tasered her four times while she was restrained. No charges were filed against the deputies who tasered McKenna, but the case became the subject of a federal civil rights investigation because of several related issues.

== Early life ==
At the age of 12, McKenna was diagnosed with schizophrenia, bipolar disorder, and depression. Other sources say the diagnosis was made when she was 14 years old. According to a family photograph, she was an honors graduate student from high school in Fairfax County, Virginia.

She had a 7-year-old daughter.

== Event ==
McKenna, a 37-year-old woman, was being held at the Fairfax County Adult Detention Center by the Fairfax County Police Department and Fairfax County Sheriff's Office in Fairfax County, Virginia, due to an outstanding warrant issued over her suspected attack on a police officer in Alexandria, Virginia.

Fairfax County officials had notified Alexandria police, whom they expected to pick up the suspect. But, there was an unexplained week-long delay in their response, and Fairfax decided to transport the prisoner to Alexandria. They said her mental condition was deteriorating. In Alexandria, better assistance could be provided, namely, the resources (i.e., legal representation to petition for a mental health hold) that were required to be provided by the warrant-issuing city.

Due to the previous assault charge against her, when McKenna was taken out of her cell, she was restrained with her arms behind her back and in handcuffs, her legs shackled, and a spit mask placed over her head. 17 minutes into the 45-minute struggle to extract her from her cell, McKenna, who was 130 lb (59 kg) and 5 ft 4 in (1.63 m) tall, was tasered. A sheriff's deputy used a stun gun to taser her four times because she wouldn't bend her knees to be put into a wheeled restraint chair.

Because she was classified as mentally ill, a specialized team was attempting to ready her for transport to Alexandria. The team was made up of six members of the Sheriff's Emergency Response Team ("SERT"); they were dressed in full-body biohazard suits and gas masks.

Shortly after being tasered, McKenna suffered cardiac arrest and lost consciousness. She was resuscitated by emergency responders while being taken to Inova Fairfax Hospital. There she was placed on life support. After five days, she was determined to be brain dead and was removed from life support. She was pronounced dead on February 8, 2015.

== Response ==
The Fairfax County Sheriff Department, led by Sheriff Stacey Ann Kincaid, conducted an initial internal investigation. This was later assigned to the Fairfax County Police, which is responsible for investigations of prisoner deaths. There were no criminal charges filed against the officers involved in McKenna's death.

The Virginia medical examiner's office made the determination that McKenna's cause of death was accidental, due to excited delirium, and that it was linked to the use of the stun gun.

Use of the stun gun was questioned by her family and counsel as being an excessive use of force on a restrained person, a small woman. Following McKenna's death, the Fairfax County Sheriff's Office suspended such use of stun guns at the county jail in April 2015.

The question of how police treat mentally ill prisoners became a focus of the discussion surrounding McKenna's death.

The Sheriff's Emergency Response Team ("SERT") records its work of cell extractions of inmates by video. The video of the incident related to McKenna was released by the Fairfax County Sheriff's office.

The Commonwealth of Fairfax County released a 51-page report prepared by their attorney, Ray Morrogh. A 110-page incident report was also made available.

The National Association for the Advancement of Colored People (NAACP) and other social justice organizations held a public protest in reaction to McKenna's death and the treatment of people of color by police.

== See also ==
- Excited delirium
- Taser safety issues
- List of killings by law enforcement officers in the United States, February 2015
- Correctional Emergency Response Team
