= All Souls Congregational Church (Bangor, Maine) =

Historic church in Maine, United States

- U.S. National Register of Historic Places
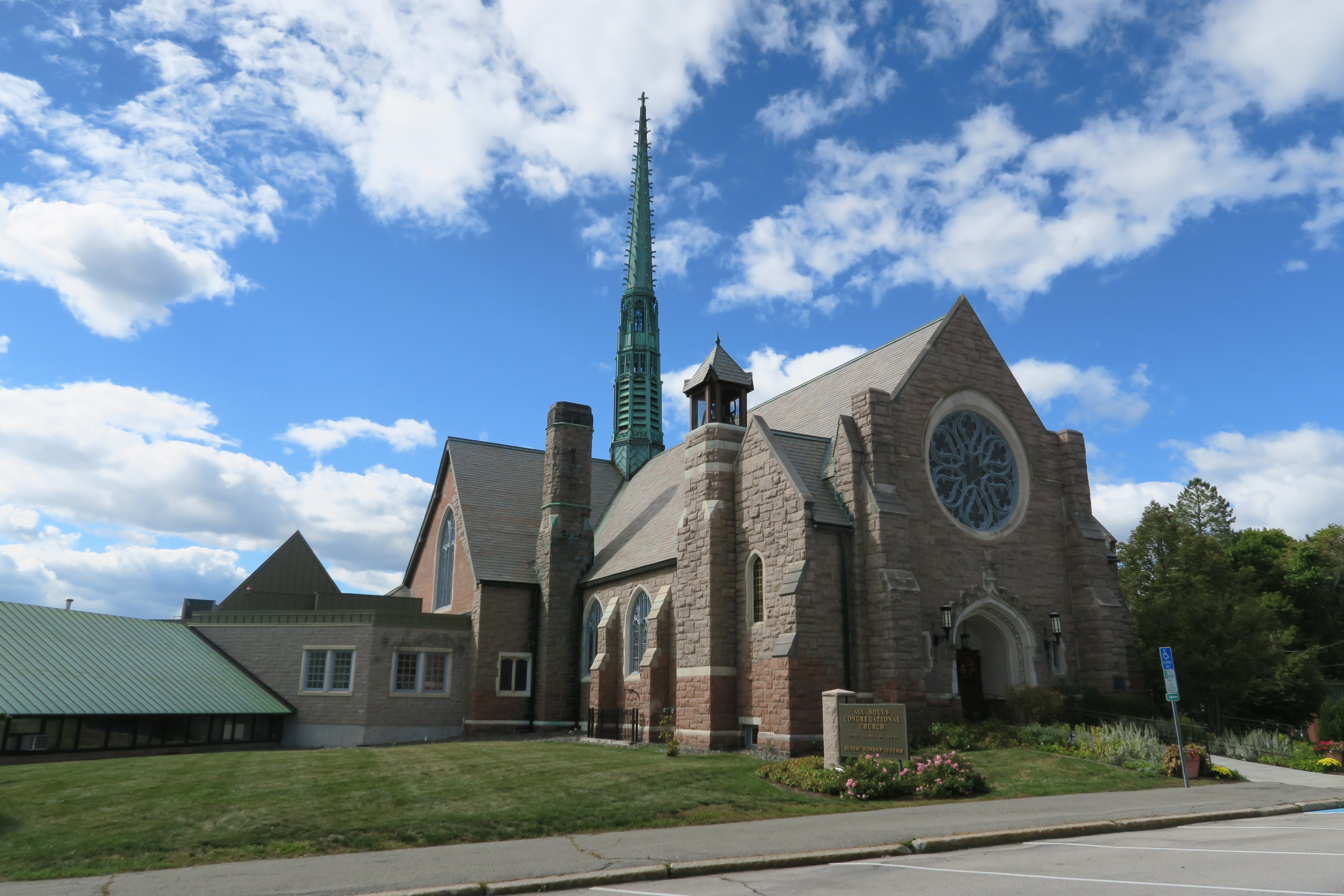

- Location within Maine Location within the United States
- Location: 10 Broadway; Bangor, Maine
- Coordinates: 44.8025°N 68.7678°W
- Area: 1.2 acres (0.49 ha)
- Built: 1911–12; 1953–54
- Architects: Cram, Goodhue & Ferguson (1911–12); Eaton W. Tarbell (1953–54)
- Architectural style: Late Gothic Revival
- NRHP reference No.: 92000790
- Added to NRHP: June 18, 1992

All Souls Congregational Church is an historic church at 10 Broadway in Bangor, Maine. Built in 1911, it is a landmark in the city, designed by the noted proponent of the Gothic Revival, Ralph Adams Cram. It was listed on the National Register of Historic Places in 1992. The church is affiliated with the United Church of Christ; the current pastor is Rev. Chad L. Poland.

== Architecture and history ==
The All Souls Church is located on the fringe of downtown Bangor, on a rise east of Kenduskeag Stream that overlooks the central business district. It occupies an entire city block, bounded by State, French, and York Streets, and by Stetson Square and Broadway to the east. The main sanctuary is a cruciform stone structure, with its long axis oriented east–west, with the chancel set at the western end. It has a steeply pitched gabled roof, with a relatively slender tower set at the crossing. A shorter square bell tower is set at the southeast corner of the crossing. The main facade faces east, and has a center entrance set in an arched recess, with a large rose window above. The building's corners and side walls are buttressed.

The First Congregational Church first built on this site in 1822. That building burned down in 1830, and was replaced by a building designed by Charles Pond. This was replaced in 1859 by a structure designed by Harvey Graves in 1859, using the foundation of the previous building. The Graves church burned down in the Great Fire of 1911. The First Congregation then joined forces with the Third Congregation, whose 1902 church was also destroyed in the fire, to build a new church on the site of the First's old one. They commissioned the noted Gothic Revival proponent Ralph Adams Cram to design the building, which incorporates stone elements of the Third's building. It was built at a cost of $110,000. Its stained glass windows, designed by Boston stained glass artist Charles J. Connick, were added between 1913 and 1947.

The building was expanded in 1953–54 with the addition of a school building, designed by local architect Eaton W. Tarbell. This addition was designed in a modernist style but was intended to harmonize with and defer to the original building. It is now named for Arlan A. Baillie.

== See also ==
- National Register of Historic Places listings in Penobscot County, Maine
