= Collins Center for the Arts =

Coordinates: 44.8998°N 68.6665°W

The Collins Center for the Arts, formerly the Maine Center for the Arts, is a performing arts center and concert hall located on the campus of the University of Maine in Orono, Maine. It has been operating since 1986, hosting both local and national artists. Its seating capacity is 1,435.

The building was designed by Bangor architect Eaton W. Tarbell.

The center is the home of the Bangor Symphony Orchestra, the oldest continually-operating community orchestra in the US, founded in 1896. The UMaine performing arts groups are also based there.

Performers such as Garrison Keillor, comedian George Carlin, and the Dave Matthews Band have done shows there, and sex therapist Dr. Ruth Westheimer, Attorney General Eric Holder, and politician Paul Rusesabagina have given lectures.

In August 2007, the university closed the Maine Center for the Arts for an 18-month renovation. The facility officially re-opened in February 2009, and was renamed the Collins Center for the Arts in honor of donors Richard R. and Anne A. Collins.

The center is also home to the Hudson Museum, an anthropology museum with collections of Native American and South American baskets, weapons, and artifacts.

== See also ==
- List of concert halls
