= Oakfield (CDP), Maine =

Oakfield, Maine
- Census-designated place
- Location within Maine Location within the United States
- Coordinates: 46°06′07″N 68°09′06″W
- Country: United States
- State: Maine
- County: Aroostook
- Town: Oakfield

Area
  - Total: 3.39 sq mi (8.77 km^{2})
  - Land: 3.39 sq mi (8.77 km^{2})
  - Water: 0 sq mi (0.00 km^{2})
- Elevation: 545 ft (166 m)

Population (2020)
  - Total: 378
  - Density: 111.7/sq mi (43.12/km^{2})
- Time zone: UTC-5 (Eastern (EST))
  - Summer (DST): UTC-4 (EDT)
- ZIP Code: 04763
- Area code: 207
- FIPS code: 23-54350
- GNIS feature ID: 2804665

Oakfield is a census-designated place (CDP) and the primary village in the town of Oakfield, Aroostook County, Maine, United States. It is in the northwestern corner of the town, on both sides of the East Branch Mattawamkeag River. Interstate 95 passes through the CDP, north of the village center, with access from Exit 286 (River Road). I-95 leads east 18 miles (29 km) to the Canada–United States border at Houlton, and southwest 101 miles (163 km) to Bangor.

Oakfield was first listed as a CDP prior to the 2020 census.

== Demographics ==
Historical population
Census	Pop.	Note	%±
2020	378		—
U.S. Decennial Census
