= Dyer Brook, Maine =

Town in Maine, United States

- Town
- Location of Dyer Brook, Maine
- Coordinates: 46°04′50″N 68°15′21″W
- Country: United States
- State: Maine
- County: Aroostook

Area
  - Total: 38.52 sq mi (99.77 km^{2})
  - Land: 38.51 sq mi (99.74 km^{2})
  - Water: 0.012 sq mi (0.03 km^{2})
- Elevation: 554 ft (169 m)

Population (2020)
  - Total: 215
  - Density: 5.7/sq mi (2.2/km^{2})
- Time zone: UTC-5 (Eastern (EST))
  - Summer (DST): UTC-4 (EDT)
- Area code: 207
- FIPS code: 23-19210
- GNIS feature ID: 582449

Dyer Brook is a town in Aroostook County, Maine, United States. The population was 215 at the 2020 census.

== Geography ==
According to the United States Census Bureau, the town has a total area of 38.52 square miles (99.77 km^{2}), of which 38.51 square miles (99.74 km^{2}) is land and 0.01 square miles (0.03 km^{2}) is water.

== Demographics ==
Historical population
Census	Pop.	Note	%±
1870	129		—
1880	172		33.3%
1890	221		28.5%
1900	280		26.7%
1910	281		0.4%
1920	385		37.0%
1930	262		−31.9%
1940	265		1.1%
1950	219		−17.4%
1960	180		−17.8%
1970	165		−8.3%
1980	275		66.7%
1990	243		−11.6%
2000	199		−18.1%
2010	213		7.0%
2020	215		0.9%
U.S. Decennial Census

=== 2010 census ===
As of the census of 2010, there were 213 people, 92 households, and 71 families living in the town. The population density was 5.5 inhabitants per square mile (2.1/km^{2}). There were 139 housing units at an average density of 3.6 per square mile (1.4/km^{2}). The racial makeup of the town was 98.1% White, 0.5% African American, and 1.4% Native American.

There were 92 households, of which 26.1% had children under the age of 18 living with them, 70.7% were married couples living together, 3.3% had a female householder with no husband present, 3.3% had a male householder with no wife present, and 22.8% were non-families. 20.7% of all households were made up of individuals, and 12% had someone living alone who was 65 years of age or older. The average household size was 2.32 and the average family size was 2.65.

The median age in the town was 48.1 years. 19.2% of residents were under the age of 18; 3.7% were between the ages of 18 and 24; 23% were from 25 to 44; 38% were from 45 to 64; and 16% were 65 years of age or older. The gender makeup of the town was 47.4% male and 52.6% female.

=== 2000 census ===
As of the census of 2000, there were 199 people, 79 households, and 62 families living in the town. The population density was 5.2 inhabitants per square mile (2.0/km^{2}). There were 116 housing units at an average density of 3.0 per square mile (1.2/km^{2}). The racial makeup of the town was 97.49% White, 2.01% Native American and 0.50% Asian.

There were 79 households, out of which 26.6% had children under the age of 18 living with them, 70.9% were married couples living together, 6.3% had a female householder with no husband present, and 21.5% were non-families. 10.1% of all households were made up of individuals, and 2.5% had someone living alone who was 65 years of age or older. The average household size was 2.52 and the average family size was 2.71.

In the town, the population was spread out, with 19.1% under the age of 18, 4.5% from 18 to 24, 23.1% from 25 to 44, 35.7% from 45 to 64, and 17.6% who were 65 years of age or older. The median age was 46 years. For every 100 females, there were 95.1 males. For every 100 females age 18 and over, there were 106.4 males.

The median income for a household in the town was $46,429, and the median income for a family was $46,429. Males had a median income of $40,000 versus $20,625 for females. The per capita income for the town was $18,658. About 2.9% of families and 5.5% of the population were below the poverty line, including 15.4% of those under the age of eighteen and none of those 65 or over.

== Education ==
Southern Aroostook Community School is the local school.

== Notable person ==
- Harold Drew, American football player and coach
