= Moro Plantation, Maine =

- Plantation
- Location of Moro Plantation, Maine
- Coordinates: 46°08′45″N 68°22′12″W
- Country: United States
- State: Maine
- County: Aroostook

Area
  - Total: 36.5 sq mi (94.6 km^{2})
  - Land: 35.4 sq mi (91.8 km^{2})
  - Water: 1.1 sq mi (2.9 km^{2})
- Elevation: 902 ft (275 m)

Population (2020)
  - Total: 44
  - Density: 1.2/sq mi (0.48/km^{2})
- Time zone: UTC-5 (Eastern (EST))
  - Summer (DST): UTC-4 (EDT)
- ZIP code: 04780
- Area code: 207
- FIPS code: 23-47175
- GNIS feature ID: 582607
- Website: pattenmaine.org

Moro Plantation is a plantation in Aroostook County, Maine, United States. The population was 44 at the 2020 census.

== Geography ==
According to the United States Census Bureau, the plantation has a total area of 36.5 square miles (94.6 km^{2}), of which 35.4 square miles (91.8 km^{2}) is land and 1.1 square miles (2.9 km^{2}), or 3.01%, is water.

== Demographics ==
Historical population
Census	Pop.	Note	%±
1880	171		—
1890	199		16.4%
1900	217		9.0%
1910	215		−0.9%
1920	181		−15.8%
1930	169		−6.6%
1940	130		−23.1%
1950	84		−35.4%
1960	49		−41.7%
1970	24		−51.0%
1980	30		25.0%
1990	38		26.7%
2000	63		65.8%
2010	38		−39.7%
2020	44		15.8%
U.S. Decennial Census

At the 2000 census there were 63 people, 25 households, and 18 families living in the plantation. The population density was 1.8 inhabitants per square mile (0.69/km^{2}). There were 85 housing units at an average density of 2.4 per square mile (0.93/km^{2}). The racial makeup of the plantation was 98.41% White, and 1.59% from two or more races. Hispanic or Latino of any race were 1.59%.

Of the 25 households 20.0% had children under the age of 18 living with them, 64.0% were married couples living together, and 28.0% were non-families. 20.0% of households were one person and 16.0% were one person aged 65 or older. The average household size was 2.52 and the average family size was 2.72.

The age distribution was 20.6% under the age of 18, 9.5% from 18 to 24, 15.9% from 25 to 44, 38.1% from 45 to 64, and 15.9% 65 or older. The median age was 47 years. For every 100 females, there were 103.2 males. For every 100 females age 18 and over, there were 100.0 males.

The median household income was $41,875 and the median family income was $41,563. Males had a median income of $46,250 versus $0 for females. The per capita income for the plantation was $15,010. There were no families and 3.5% of the population living below the poverty line, including no under eighteens and none of those over 64.

== Politics ==
The Plantation of Moro cast 27 votes in the 2016 Presidential Election 25 for Republican candidate Donald Trump, one vote for Democratic candidate Hillary Clinton and one for Independent candidate Evan McMullin.
