= Smyrna, Maine =

Town in Maine, United States

- Town
- Location of Smyrna, Maine
- Coordinates: 46°08′35″N 68°06′21″W
- Country: United States
- State: Maine
- County: Aroostook
- Villages: Smyrna Center; Smyrna Mills

Area
  - Total: 35.20 sq mi (91.17 km^{2})
  - Land: 35.11 sq mi (90.93 km^{2})
  - Water: 0.089 sq mi (0.23 km^{2})
- Elevation: 879 ft (268 m)

Population (2020)
  - Total: 439
  - Density: 12/sq mi (4.8/km^{2})
- Time zone: UTC-5 (Eastern (EST))
  - Summer (DST): UTC-4 (EDT)
- ZIP Codes: 04780 (Smyrna Mills); 04730 (Houlton)
- Area code: 207
- FIPS code: 23-69260
- GNIS feature ID: 582727
- Website: smyrna.aroostook.me.us

Smyrna is a town in Aroostook County, Maine, United States. The population was 439 at the 2020 census.

== Geography ==
According to the United States Census Bureau, the town has a total area of 35.20 square miles (91.17 km^{2}), of which 35.11 square miles (90.93 km^{2}) is land and 0.09 square miles (0.23 km^{2}) is water.

== Demographics ==
Historical population
Census	Pop.	Note	%±
1840	184		—
1850	172		−6.5%
1860	165		−4.1%
1870	159		−3.6%
1880	237		49.1%
1890	303		27.8%
1900	411		35.6%
1910	411		0.0%
1920	460		11.9%
1930	442		−3.9%
1940	409		−7.5%
1950	349		−14.7%
1960	331		−5.2%
1970	318		−3.9%
1980	354		11.3%
1990	378		6.8%
2000	415		9.8%
2010	442		6.5%
2020	439		−0.7%
U.S. Decennial Census

=== 2010 census ===
At the 2010 census there were 442 people, 155 households, and 108 families living in the town. The population density was 12.6 inhabitants per square mile (4.9/km^{2}). There were 188 housing units at an average density of 5.4 per square mile (2.1/km^{2}). The racial makeup of the town was 98.2% White, 1.1% Native American, 0.2% Asian, and 0.5% from two or more races. Hispanic or Latino of any race were 0.2%.

Of the 155 households 36.1% had children under the age of 18 living with them, 58.7% were married couples living together, 5.2% had a female householder with no husband present, 5.8% had a male householder with no wife present, and 30.3% were non-families. 22.6% of households were one person and 8.4% were one person aged 65 or older. The average household size was 2.85 and the average family size was 3.40.

The median age in the town was 36.8 years. 29.2% of residents were under the age of 18; 6% were between the ages of 18 and 24; 23.8% were from 25 to 44; 30.6% were from 45 to 64; and 10.4% were 65 or older. The gender makeup of the town was 49.3% male and 50.7% female.

=== 2000 census ===
At the 2000 census there were 415 people, 155 households, and 110 families living in the town. The population density was 11.8 people per square mile (4.6/km^{2}). There were 184 housing units at an average density of 5.2 per square mile (2.0/km^{2}). The racial makeup of the town was 99.28% White, 0.24% Native American, 0.24% Asian, and 0.24% from two or more races. Of the 155 households 33.5% had children under the age of 18 living with them, 60.6% were married couples living together, 7.1% had a female householder with no husband present, and 29.0% were non-families. 25.8% of households were one person and 14.2% were one person aged 65 or older. The average household size was 2.68 and the average family size was 3.25.

The age distribution was 27.0% under the age of 18, 8.9% from 18 to 24, 28.7% from 25 to 44, 20.5% from 45 to 64, and 14.9% 65 or older. The median age was 37 years. For every 100 females, there were 93.9 males. For every 100 females age 18 and over, there were 89.4 males.

The median household income was $25,625 and the median family income was $27,917. Males had a median income of $23,625 versus $20,313 for females. The per capita income for the town was $11,751. About 16.4% of families and 20.3% of the population were below the poverty line, including 24.1% of those under age 18 and 26.7% of those age 65 or over.

== Amish community ==
There is an Amish community in Smyrna, that began as one of the "Christian Communities" of Elmo Stoll in 1996. From the beginning most members had an Amish background, but some came from other plain communities while others had no plain background. Soon after the early death of Elmo Stoll in 1998, the "Christian Communities" began to disband. The community in Smyrna lost most of his members, who had no plain background, and then decided to seek fellowship with the Michigan Amish Churches of the Old Order Amish. The Amish in Smyrna are said to be more open to outsiders than other Amish communities. They hold most of their church services in English. They are in fellowship with the Maine Amish in Unity and Hodgdon. Contrary to most other Amish, the Amish men in Smyrna wear moustaches along with long beards, which reflects their "Christian Communities" history. In 2005, the Amish community consisted of approximately 100 people.
