= Smyrna Mills, Maine =

- Unincorporated community
- Location within Maine Location within the United States
- Coordinates: 46°07′46″N 68°09′51″W
- Country: United States
- State: Maine
- County: Aroostook
- Town: Smyrna
- Elevation: 574 ft (175 m)
- Time zone: UTC-5 (Eastern (EST))
  - Summer (DST): UTC-4 (EDT)
- ZIP code: 04780
- Area code: 207
- GNIS feature ID: 575656

Smyrna Mills is an unincorporated village in the town of Smyrna, in Aroostook County, Maine, United States. The community is located on U.S. Route 2, near Interstate 95, 15.5 miles (24.9 km) west of Houlton. Smyrna Mills has a post office, with ZIP code 04780.
