= Oakfield, Maine =

Town in Maine, United States

- Town
- Location of Oakfield, Maine
- Coordinates: 46°04′50″N 68°07′28″W
- Country: United States
- State: Maine
- County: Aroostook

Area
  - Total: 35.91 sq mi (93.01 km^{2})
  - Land: 35.15 sq mi (91.04 km^{2})
  - Water: 0.76 sq mi (1.97 km^{2})
- Elevation: 1,332 ft (406 m)

Population (2020)
  - Total: 661
  - Density: 19/sq mi (7.3/km^{2})
- Time zone: UTC-5 (Eastern (EST))
  - Summer (DST): UTC-4 (EDT)
- ZIP code: 04763
- Area code: 207
- FIPS code: 23-54385
- GNIS feature ID: 582644
- Website: www.oakfieldme.org

Oakfield is a town in Aroostook County, Maine, United States. The population was 661 at the 2020 census. The village of Oakfield, listed as a census-designated place, is in the northwestern corner of the town.

== Geography ==
According to the United States Census Bureau, the town has a total area of 18.9 square miles (48.95 km^{2}), of which 10.2 square miles (26.42 km^{2}) is land and 8.7 square miles (22.53 km^{2}) is water.

== Schools ==
Oakfield is part of Regional School Unit (RSU) #50.

== Demographics ==
Historical population
Census	Pop.	Note	%±
1870	559		—
1880	636		13.8%
1890	720		13.2%
1900	860		19.4%
1910	928		7.9%
1920	1,016		9.5%
1930	982		−3.3%
1940	1,059		7.8%
1950	1,009		−4.7%
1960	848		−16.0%
1970	836		−1.4%
1980	847		1.3%
1990	846		−0.1%
2000	732		−13.5%
2010	737		0.7%
2020	661		−10.3%
U.S. Decennial Census

=== 2010 census ===
At the 2010 census there were 737 people, 323 households, and 215 families living in the town. The population density was 21.0 inhabitants per square mile (8.1/km^{2}). There were 496 housing units at an average density of 14.1 per square mile (5.4/km^{2}). The racial makeup of the town was 96.7% White, 0.3% African American, 2.0% Native American, 0.1% from other races, and 0.8% from two or more races. Hispanic or Latino of any race were 1.4%.

Of the 323 households 25.7% had children under the age of 18 living with them, 55.7% were married couples living together, 7.7% had a female householder with no husband present, 3.1% had a male householder with no wife present, and 33.4% were non-families. 30.0% of households were one person and 15.8% were one person aged 65 or older. The average household size was 2.28 and the average family size was 2.78.

The median age in the town was 48.7 years. 17.9% of residents were under the age of 18; 6.3% were between the ages of 18 and 24; 18.1% were from 25 to 44; 36.4% were from 45 to 64; and 21.3% were 65 or older. The gender makeup of the town was 49.8% male and 50.2% female.

=== 2000 census ===
At the 2000 census there were 732 people, 317 households, and 209 families living in the town. The population density was 20.7 people per square mile (8.0/km^{2}). There were 500 housing units at an average density of 14.2 per square mile (5.5/km^{2}). The racial makeup of the town was 98.22% White, 1.09% Native American, 0.68% from other races. Hispanic or Latino of any race were 0.82%.

Of the 317 households 25.2% had children under the age of 18 living with them, 58.4% were married couples living together, 5.7% had a female householder with no husband present, and 33.8% were non-families. 28.7% of households were one person and 16.4% were one person aged 65 or older. The average household size was 2.31 and the average family size was 2.85.

The age distribution was 19.3% under the age of 18, 6.1% from 18 to 24, 25.5% from 25 to 44, 28.1% from 45 to 64, and 20.9% 65 or older. The median age was 44 years. For every 100 females, there were 94.2 males. For every 100 females age 18 and over, there were 95.7 males.

The median household income was $25,859 and the median family income was $30,556. Males had a median income of $24,028 versus $17,500 for females. The per capita income for the town was $12,951. About 10.7% of families and 14.7% of the population were below the poverty line, including 21.4% of those under age 18 and 17.2% of those age 65 or over.

== Places of interest ==
- Oakfield Station
