= Merrill, Maine =

Town in Maine, United States

- Town
- Location of Merrill, Maine
- Coordinates: 46°08′41″N 68°14′12″W
- Country: United States
- State: Maine
- County: Aroostook

Area
  - Total: 37.38 sq mi (96.81 km^{2})
  - Land: 37.35 sq mi (96.74 km^{2})
  - Water: 0.031 sq mi (0.08 km^{2})
- Elevation: 978 ft (298 m)

Population (2020)
  - Total: 208
  - Density: 5.7/sq mi (2.2/km^{2})
- Time zone: UTC-5 (Eastern (EST))
  - Summer (DST): UTC-4 (EDT)
- Area code: 207
- FIPS code: 23-45180
- GNIS feature ID: 582592
- Website: merrill.aroostook.me.us

Merrill is a town in Aroostook County, Maine, United States. The population was 208 at the 2020 census.

== Geography ==
According to the United States Census Bureau, the town has a total area of 37.38 square miles (96.81 km^{2}), of which 37.35 square miles (96.74 km^{2}) is land and 0.03 square miles (0.08 km^{2}) is water.

== Demographics ==
Historical population
Census	Pop.	Note	%±
1860	105		—
1870	118		12.4%
1880	206		74.6%
1890	244		18.4%
1900	298		22.1%
1910	393		31.9%
1920	361		−8.1%
1930	458		26.9%
1940	424		−7.4%
1950	383		−9.7%
1960	337		−12.0%
1970	271		−19.6%
1980	285		5.2%
1990	296		3.9%
2000	249		−15.9%
2010	273		9.6%
2020	208		−23.8%
U.S. Decennial Census

=== 2010 census ===
As of the census of 2010, there were 273 people, 104 households, and 77 families living in the town. The population density was 7.3 inhabitants per square mile (2.8/km^{2}). There were 149 housing units at an average density of 4.0 per square mile (1.5/km^{2}). The racial makeup of the town was 93.4% White, 1.5% African American, 4.4% Native American, and 0.7% from two or more races. Hispanic or Latino of any race were 1.1% of the population.

There were 104 households, of which 30.8% had children under the age of 18 living with them, 59.6% were married couples living together, 9.6% had a female householder with no husband present, 4.8% had a male householder with no wife present, and 26.0% were non-families. 22.1% of all households were made up of individuals, and 12.5% had someone living alone who was 65 years of age or older. The average household size was 2.63 and the average family size was 3.03.

The median age in the town was 45.1 years. 23.8% of residents were under the age of 18; 8.8% were between the ages of 18 and 24; 17.2% were from 25 to 44; 36.7% were from 45 to 64; and 13.6% were 65 years of age or older. The gender makeup of the town was 50.5% male and 49.5% female.

=== 2000 census ===
As of the census of 2000, there were 249 people, 103 households, and 73 families living in the town. The population density was 6.6 people per square mile (2.6/km^{2}). There were 141 housing units at an average density of 3.8 per square mile (1.4/km^{2}). The racial makeup of the town was 98.39% White, 0.80% Native American, and 0.80% from two or more races. Hispanic or Latino of any race were 0.80% of the population.

There were 103 households, out of which 31.1% had children under the age of 18 living with them, 58.3% were married couples living together, 7.8% had a female householder with no husband present, and 28.2% were non-families. 22.3% of all households were made up of individuals, and 9.7% had someone living alone who was 65 years of age or older. The average household size was 2.42 and the average family size was 2.82.

In the town, the population was spread out, with 22.1% under the age of 18, 5.6% from 18 to 24, 30.9% from 25 to 44, 25.7% from 45 to 64, and 15.7% who were 65 years of age or older. The median age was 42 years. For every 100 females, there were 104.1 males. For every 100 females age 18 and over, there were 106.4 males.

The median income for a household in the town was $26,806, and the median income for a family was $31,667. Males had a median income of $26,944 versus $21,250 for females. The per capita income for the town was $11,532. About 14.9% of families and 16.4% of the population were below the poverty line, including 22.9% of those under the age of eighteen and 22.9% of those 65 or over.
