= Lantern of Demosthenes =

Lantern of Demosthenes may refer to:

- Choragic Monument of Lysicrates, a monument near the Athens Acropolis or a structure elsewhere based on it
- Lantern of Demosthenes (view), a panoramic view from the Parc de Saint-Cloud
