= List of parks and cemeteries in South Portland, Maine =

South Portland, Maine is home to 11 cemeteries and a number of municipal park:

- Bay View Cemetery
- Brown's Hill Cemetery
- Bug Light Park
- Calvary Cemetery
- Clark's Pond Trail
- DiPietro Park
- Forest City Cemetery
- Hinckley Park: a public park totaling 40 acres (16 ha), includes two ponds and 0.75 miles (1.21 km) walking trail. In 2019, the popular dog walking spot was highlighted for an abundance of animal feces.
- Jordan Park
- Smith Street Cemetery, the first Jewish cemetery in Maine (established 1875)
- South Portland Municipal Golf Course
- Thomas Knight Park
- Trout Brook Nature Area
- Willard Beach
