= Bug Light Park =

Park in South Portland, Maine, United States

Coordinates: 43°39′12″N 70°14′3″W

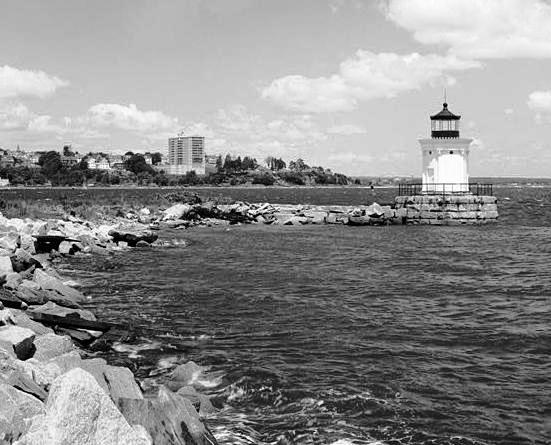
Portland Breakwater Lighthouse.

Bug Light Park is a 9-acre (3.6 ha) public park in South Portland, Maine, United States. The park is known for views of Casco Bay as well as the skyline of nearby Portland, Maine. The park is adjacent to Portland Breakwater Light. It is a popular destination for picnicking, boating, kite flying and salt water fishing. It is also the home of the South Portland Historical Society and Cushing Point Museum.

== History ==
The land known as Bug Light Park was previously a World War II-era shipyard. In 1990, South Portland unsuccessfully sought for the State of Maine's Land for Maine's Future program to purchase the space. In June 1996, South Portland voters endorsed a $996,000 bond to purchase the land. Along with extensive private fundraising, these funds were used to purchase the land for the City of South Portland and convert it into a municipal park. At the time of the vote, the land was owned by Spring Point Associates
