= South Portland Historical Society =

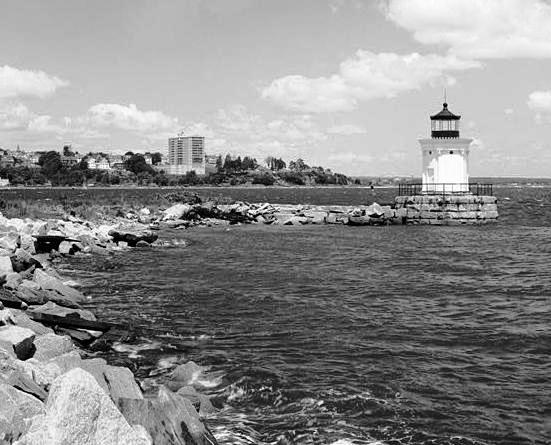
"Bug Light" with Portland's Eastern Promenade in the background.

The South Portland Historical Society is a nonprofit organization dedicated to preserving the social, commercial and cultural heritage of South Portland, Maine.

== History ==
The Society was established in 1964 as the South Portland Cape Elizabeth Historical Society. It was renamed the South Portland Historical Society in 2003 to emphasize its role as the historical society of the city of South Portland.

The Society operates a museum and a gift shop, and it has published several books and DVDs relating to South Portland's history. The director of the Society is Kathy DiPhilippo and the Society's president is John McCall.

In 2009, the Society relocated its headquarters from the basement of the South Portland City Hall to the Cushing's Point House, known as the Cushing's Point Museum at Bug Light Park in South Portland. The new location was a donation to the Society from the Portland Pipe Line Corporation.
