= Portland Breakwater Light =

Lighthouse in Maine, US

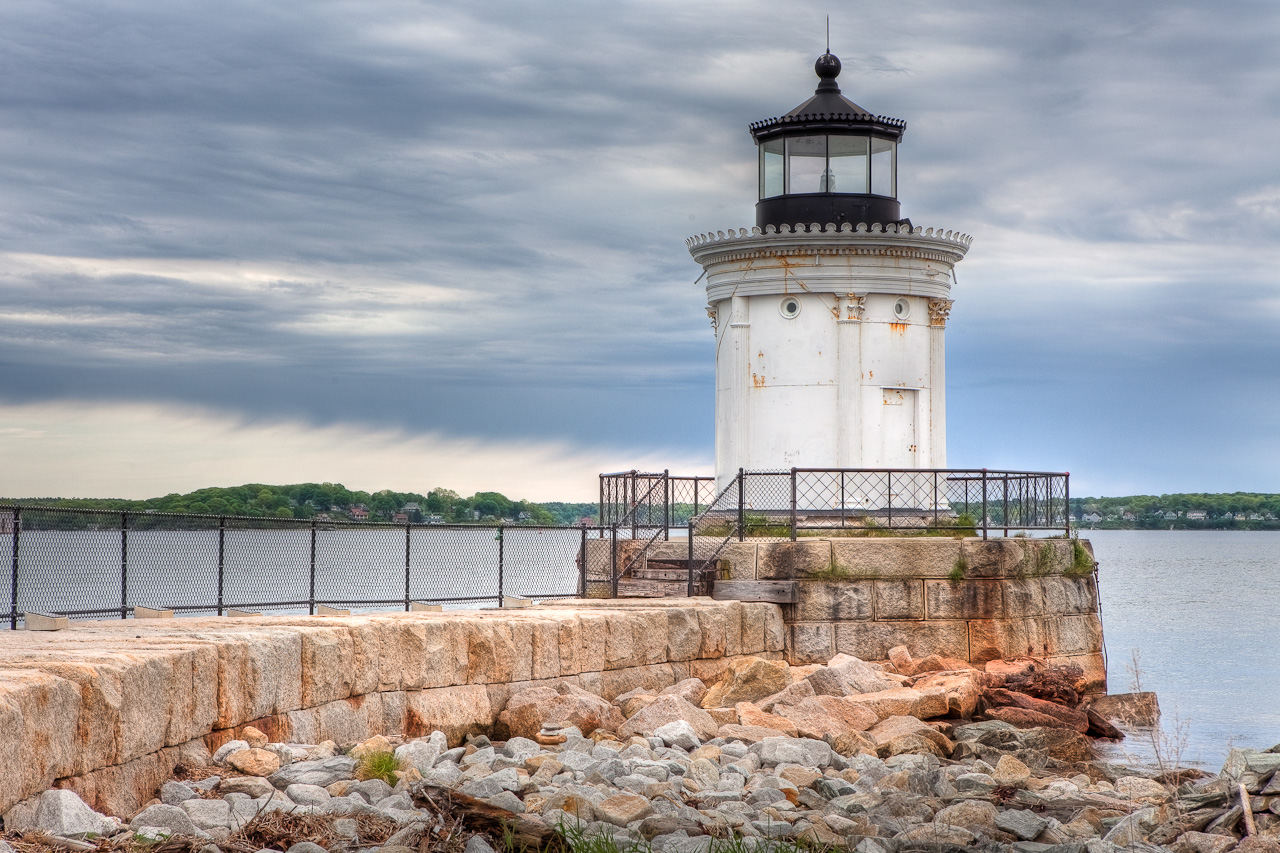
- Portland Breakwater Lighthouse after restoration
- Location: NE end of Portland Breakwater in Portland Harbor, South Portland, Maine
- Coordinates: 43°39′19.872″N 70°14′5.471″W

Tower
- Constructed: 1855
- Foundation: Granite block caisson
- Construction: Iron plate with brick lining
- Automated: 1934 (92 years ago)
- Height: 7.5 m (25 ft)
- Shape: conical
- Markings: resembles 4th-century Greek monument
- Heritage: National Register of Historic Places listed place

Light
- First lit: 1875 (151 years ago) (current tower)
- Deactivated: 1942 (84 years ago)
- Focal height: 30 feet (9.1 m)
- Lens: Sixth order fresnel, 1855
- Characteristic: Flashing white 4 s
- Portland Breakwater Light
- U.S. National Register of Historic Places
- Architect: Thomas U. Walter
- Architectural style: Greek Revival
- NRHP reference No.: 73000238
- Added to NRHP: June 19, 1973

The Portland Breakwater Light (also called Bug Light) is a small lighthouse in South Portland, Maine, United States.

== History ==
A lighthouse was first built here in 1855 as a wooden structure. The breakwater was extended and a new lighthouse was constructed at the end of it in 1875. The new lighthouse was made of curved cast-iron plates whose seams are disguised by six decorative Corinthian columns. Its design was inspired by the Choragic Monument of Lysicrates in Athens, made well-known by engravings. The architect was Thomas U. Walter, most noted as the designer of the U.S. Capitol east and west wings and its current dome. Wooden sheds and a six-room house for the lighthouse-keeper were added incrementally as needed. In 1897, Spring Point Ledge Light was erected and the houses around Bug Light were demolished and the Spring Point Ledge Lighthouse keepers tended to both lighthouses. During World War II, the breakwater was slowly absorbed by landfill as the New England Shipbuilding Corporation built two shipyards next to the lighthouse. These shipyards produced Liberty Ships for the war effort. Because of the smaller breakwater, there was less need for the lighthouse and it was decommissioned in 1943.

== Restoration ==
The light was fully restored in 1989 and was reactivated in 2002. It appears as a private aid to navigation in the US Coast Guard Light List as South Portland Breakwater Light. A park named after the lighthouse, Bug Light Park, allows visitors to view the Portland Breakwater Light up close, while memorializing the shipbuilding efforts of World War II. The light was added to the National Register of Historic Places as Portland Breakwater Light on June 19, 1973, reference number 73000238.

== Gallery ==
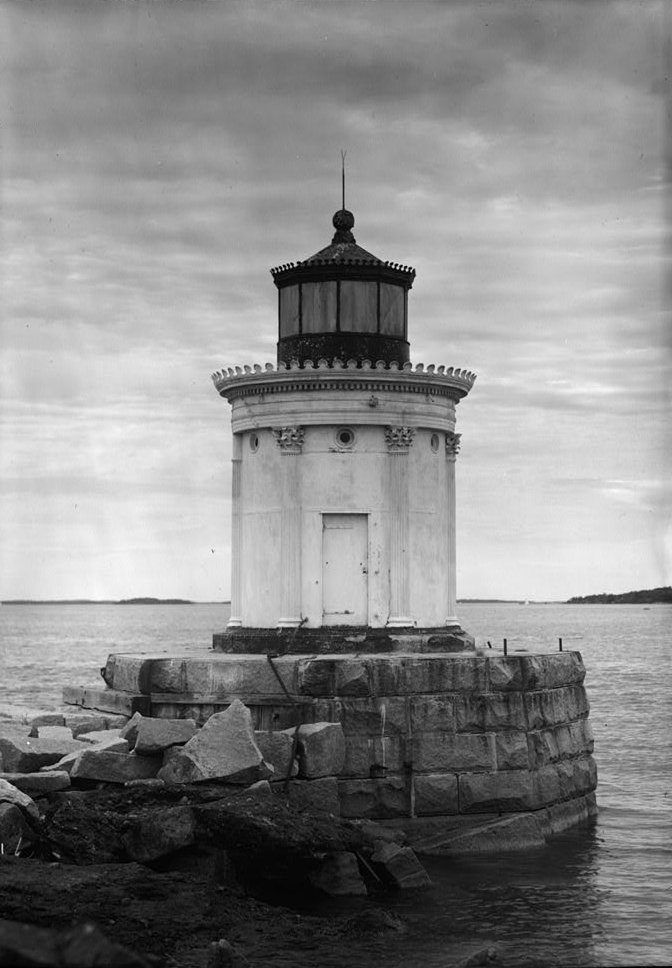
Bug Light before restoration (1962)

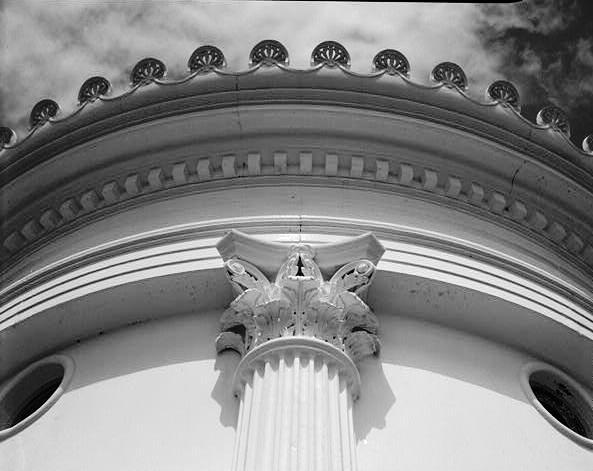
Corinthian columns

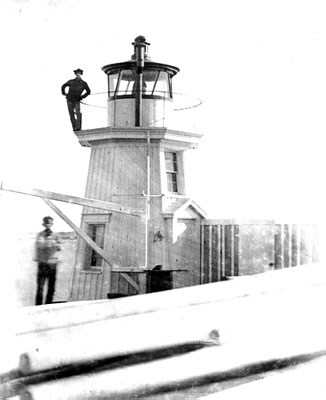
The first (wooden) Portland Breakwater Light

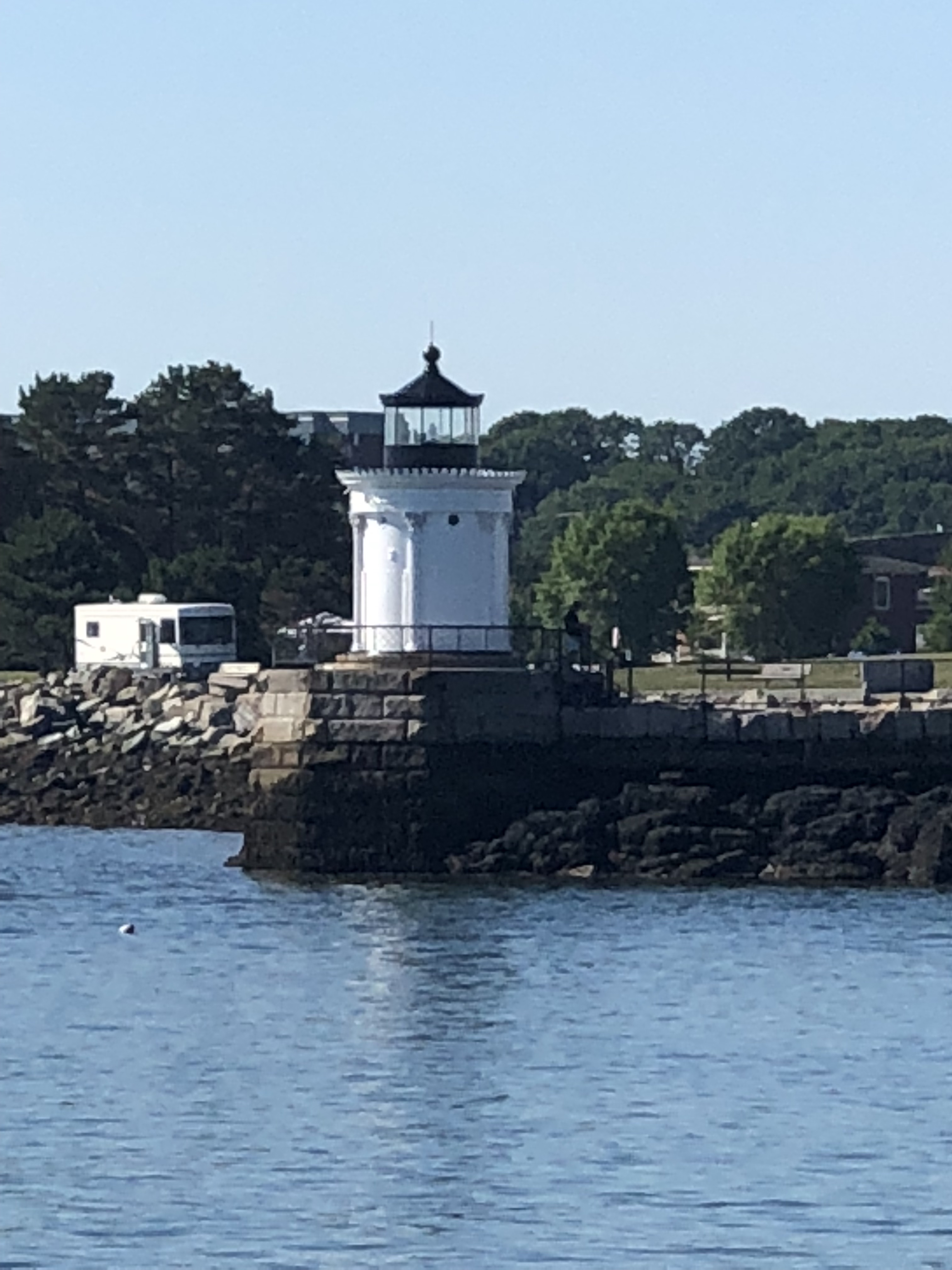
Bug Light in 2018

== See also ==
- National Register of Historic Places listings in Cumberland County, Maine
