= Choragic Monument of Lysicrates =

Ancient Greek choragic monument in Athens

Coordinates: 37°58′15″N 23°43′48″E

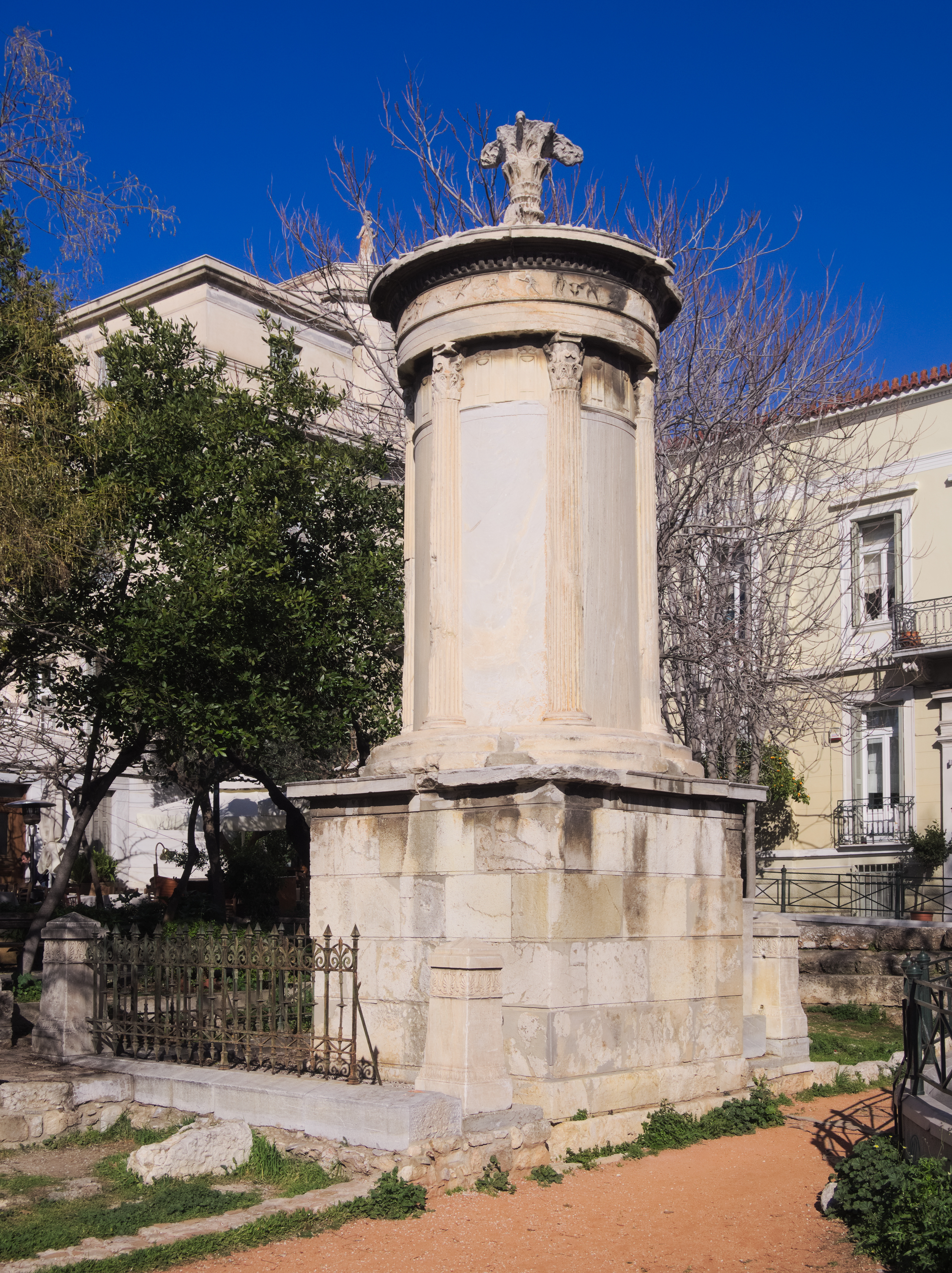
The Choragic Monument of Lysicrates in Athens

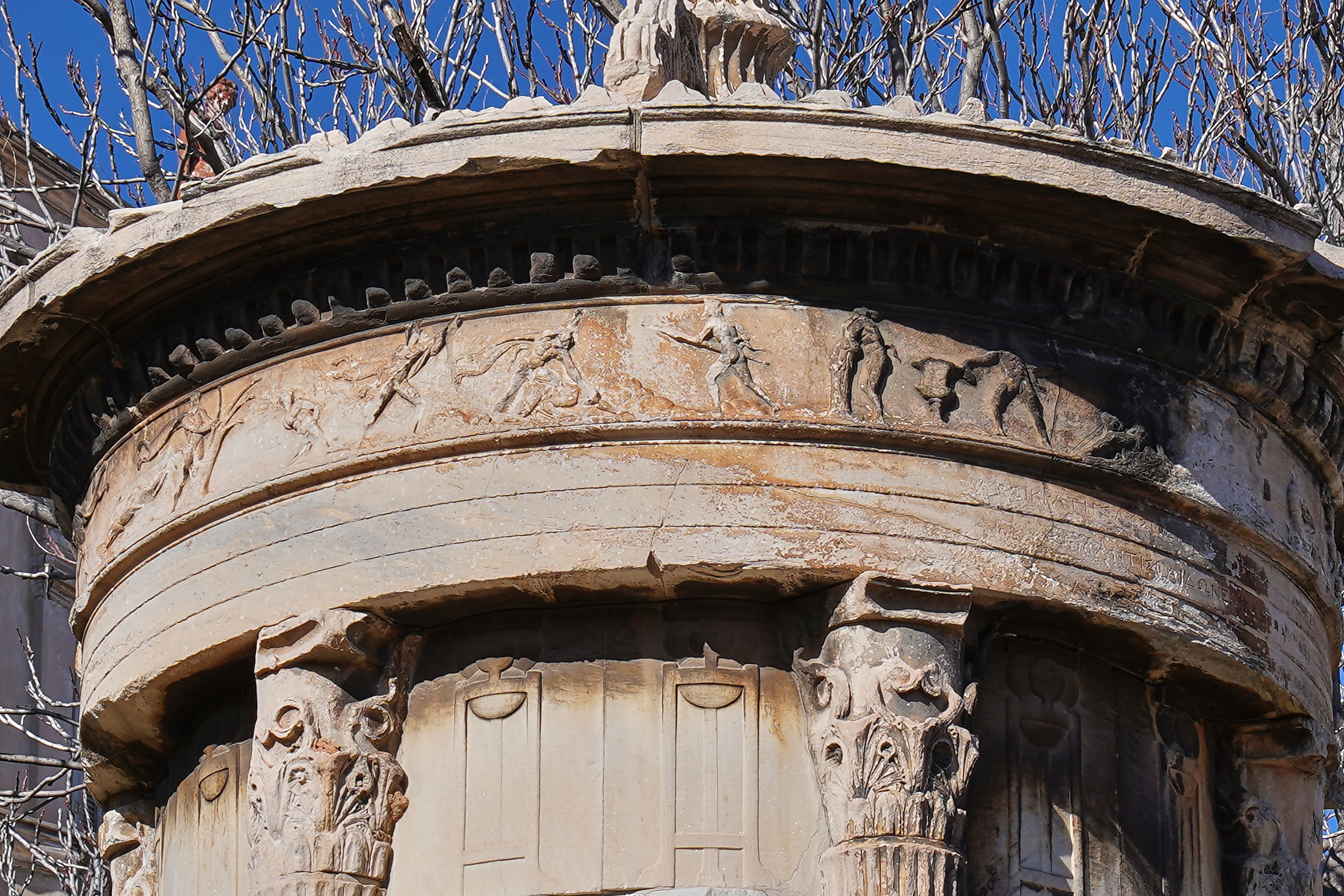
The frieze

The Choragic Monument of Lysicrates near the Acropolis of Athens was erected by the choregos Lysicrates, a wealthy patron of musical performances in the Theater of Dionysus, to commemorate the prize in the dithyramb contest of the City Dionysia in 335/334 BCE, of which performance he was liturgist.

The monument is known as the first use of the Corinthian order on the exterior of a building. It has been reproduced widely in modern monuments and building elements.

== History ==
The circular structure, raised on a high squared podium, is the first Greek monument built in the Corinthian order on its exterior. It was originally crowned with an elaborate floral support for the bronze tripod, the prize awarded to Lysicrates' chorus. The sculpture on the frieze is thought to depict the myth of Dionysus and the Tyrrhenian pirates from the Homeric Hymn to Dionysus. Immediately below the architrave and between the column capitals is a second frieze depicting the choragic tripods. The monument is inscribed "Lysikrates son of Lysitheides of Kikynna was sponsor, Akamantis was victorious in the boys' competition, Theon was pipe-player, Lysiades of Athens directed, Euainetos was archon". It stands now in its little garden on the Tripodon Street ("Street of the Tripods"), which follows the line of the ancient street of the name, which led to the Theater of Dionysus and was once lined with choragic monuments, of which foundations were discovered in excavations during the 1980s.

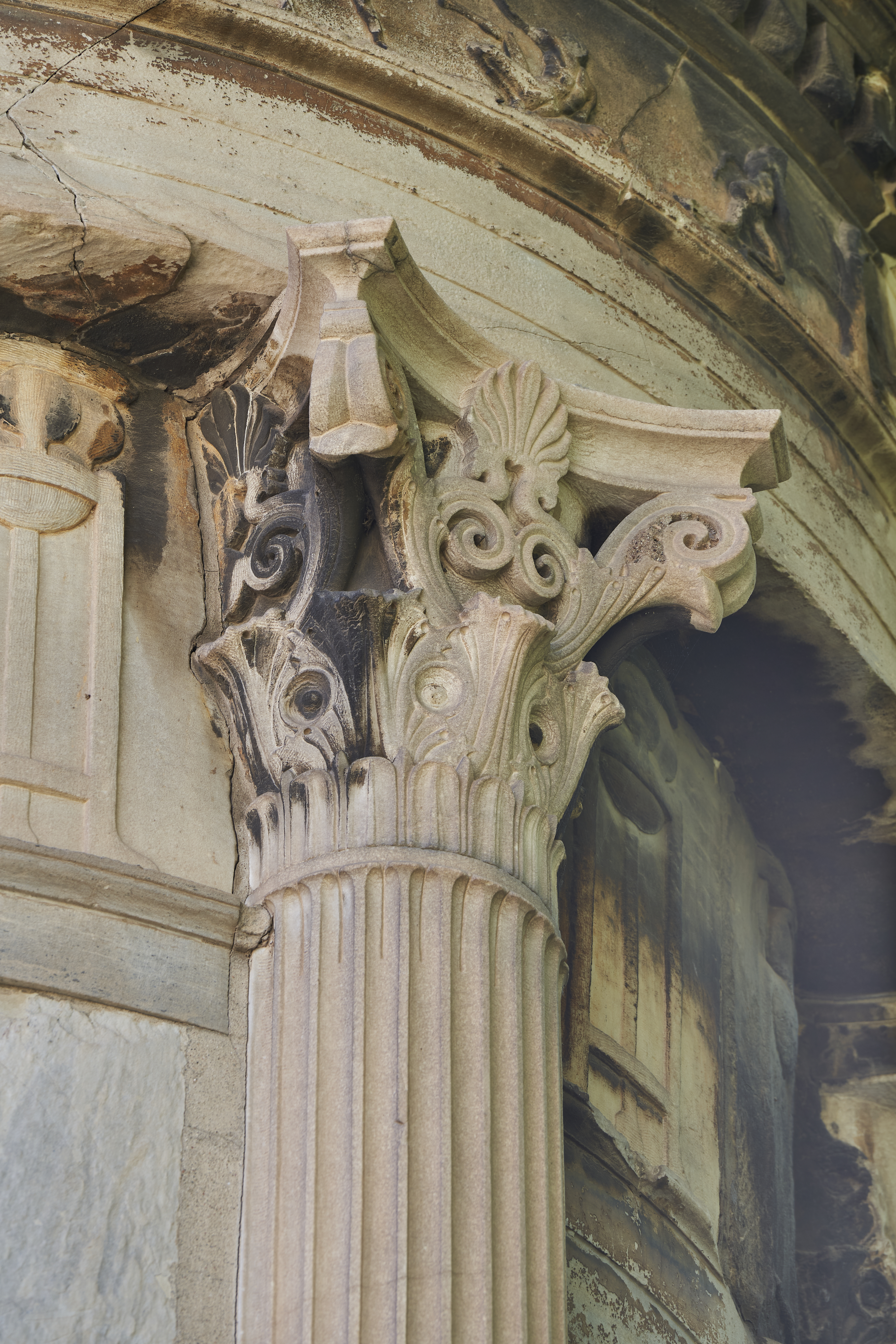
Original Corinthian capital from the monument, 335 BC.

In 1658, a French Capuchin monastery was founded by the site; in 1669 the monastery succeeded in purchasing the monument, which by the early 19th century was being used as the monastery library. The monument was popularly known as the "Lantern of Demosthenes" or "Lantern of Diogenes", although a reading of its inscription by Jacob Spon had established its original purpose. The young British architects James "Athenian" Stuart and Nicholas Revett published the first measured drawings of the monument in their Antiquities of Athens (London 1762). The monument became famous in France and England through engravings of it, and contemporary versions of it became eye-catching features in several English landscape gardens. Lord Byron stayed at the monastery during his second visit to Greece. In 1818, friar Francis planted in its gardens the first tomato plants in Greece. In 1821 the convent was burned by the Ottomans during the Greek War of Independence, and subsequently demolished, and the monument was inadvertently exposed to the weather. In 1829, the monks offered the structure to an Englishman on tour, but it proved to be too cumbersome to disassemble and ship. Lord Elgin negotiated unsuccessfully for the monument, by then an icon in the Greek Revival.

French archaeologists cleared the rubble from the half-buried monument and searched the area for missing architectural parts. In 1876–1887, the architects François Boulanger and E. Loviot supervised a restoration under the auspices of the French government.

In June 2016, anarchists vandalised the monument with spray paint, writing: "Your Greek monuments are concentration camps for immigrants".

== Other versions ==
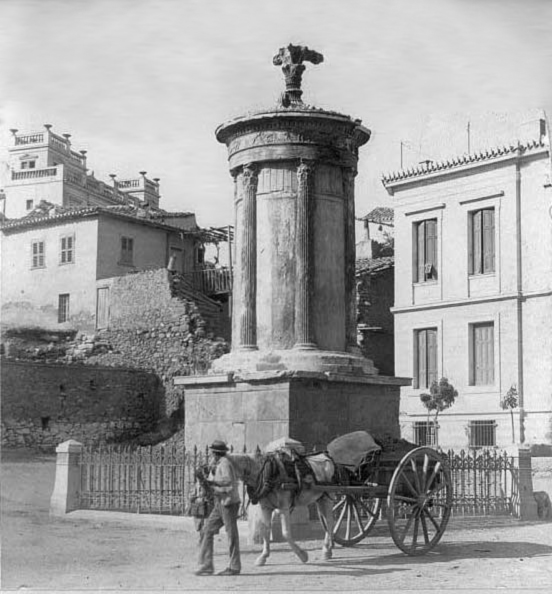
View of 1900

Famous British versions of the Choragic Monument include the Dugald Stewart Monument and Burns' Monument both on Calton Hill in Edinburgh, on the towers of the former North Kirk in Aberdeen and St Giles Church in Elgin, the Huskisson Memorial in St James Cemetery Liverpool, the Saracen Fountain in Glasgow and in the gardens at Shugborough, Staffordshire, Tatton Park and Alton Towers among many others. The Grade I-listed St John the Evangelist's Church, Chichester, now redundant, is topped with a "preposterous miniature" of the monument.

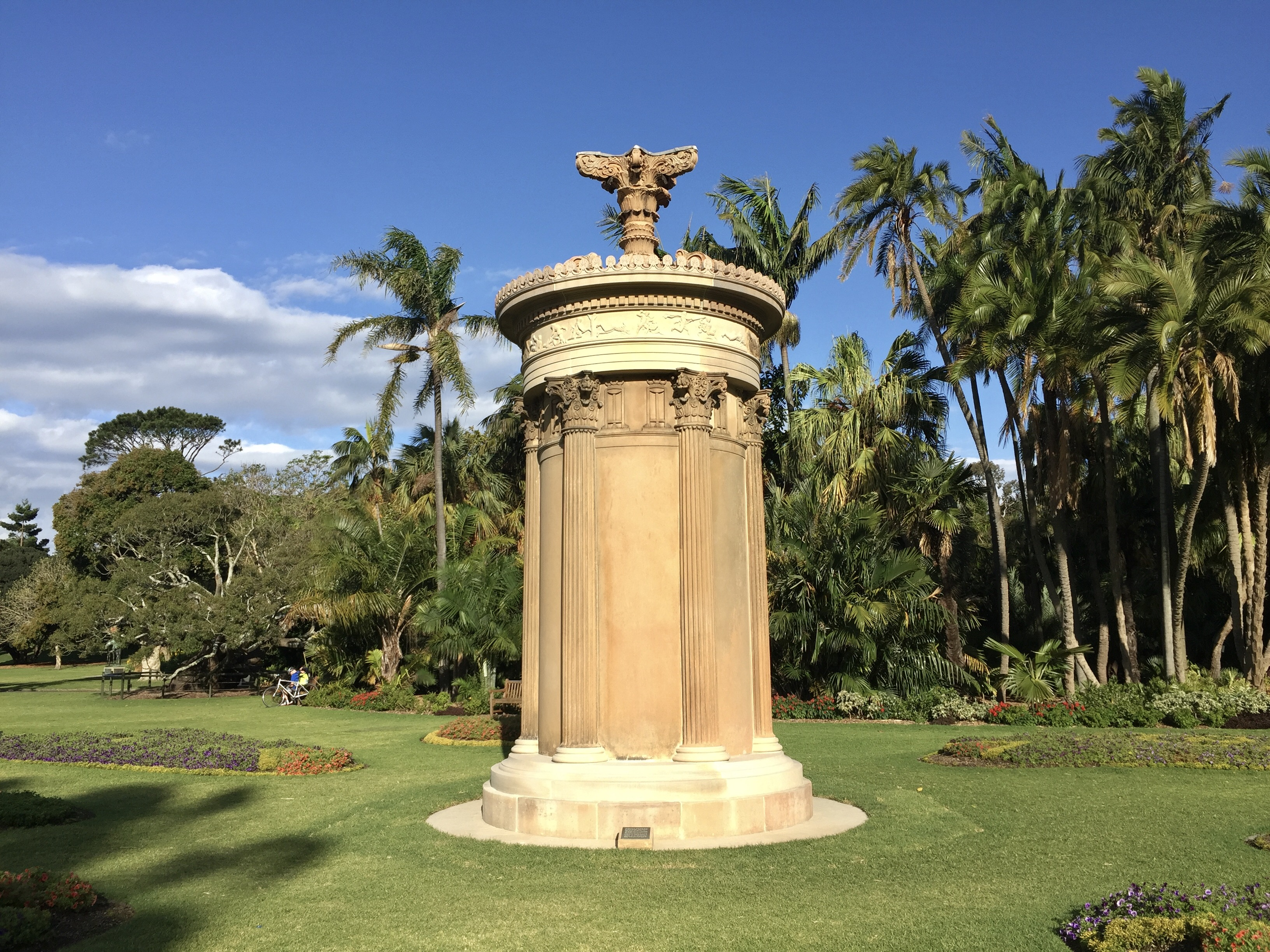
Replica in the Royal Botanic Gardens, Sydney

In Australia, there is a version in the Royal Botanic Gardens, Sydney in New South Wales. It is also reproduced at the Shrine of Remembrance in Melbourne where it forms a crowning element at the top of the memorial's pyramid-like roof.

In the United States, the Choragic Monument was William Strickland's model for the cupola of the Merchants' Exchange in Philadelphia and copied by him for the cupola atop the Tennessee State Capitol building in Nashville. A tower housing a bell on the capitol grounds is also based on the Choragic Monument, as well as the Tower of the Winds. The design of the Portland Breakwater Light in Maine was inspired by the monument. It was adapted for Civil War memorials and capped many Beaux-Arts towers, such as The San Remo's towers in New York. The most prominent example is the Soldiers' and Sailors' Monument designed by architects Charles and Arthur Stoughton and erected on Riverside Drive in New York City in 1902. A bronze miniature of the Choragic Monument is handed out for the Richard H. Driehaus Prize recognizing a living architect whose work exemplifies the values of traditional and classical architecture in a contemporary built environment. The University of Notre Dame's Walsh Family Hall of Architecture features a tower crowned by a replica of the Choragic Monument. There is also a replica on top of the First Congregational Church in Burlington, Vermont. It was constructed in 1842 and designed by architect Henry Searle. With open bays between the columns, it serves as a bell tower for the church.
