= Fort Williams (Maine) =

Former United States Army fort

- Part of Harbor Defenses of Portland
- Cape Elizabeth, Maine
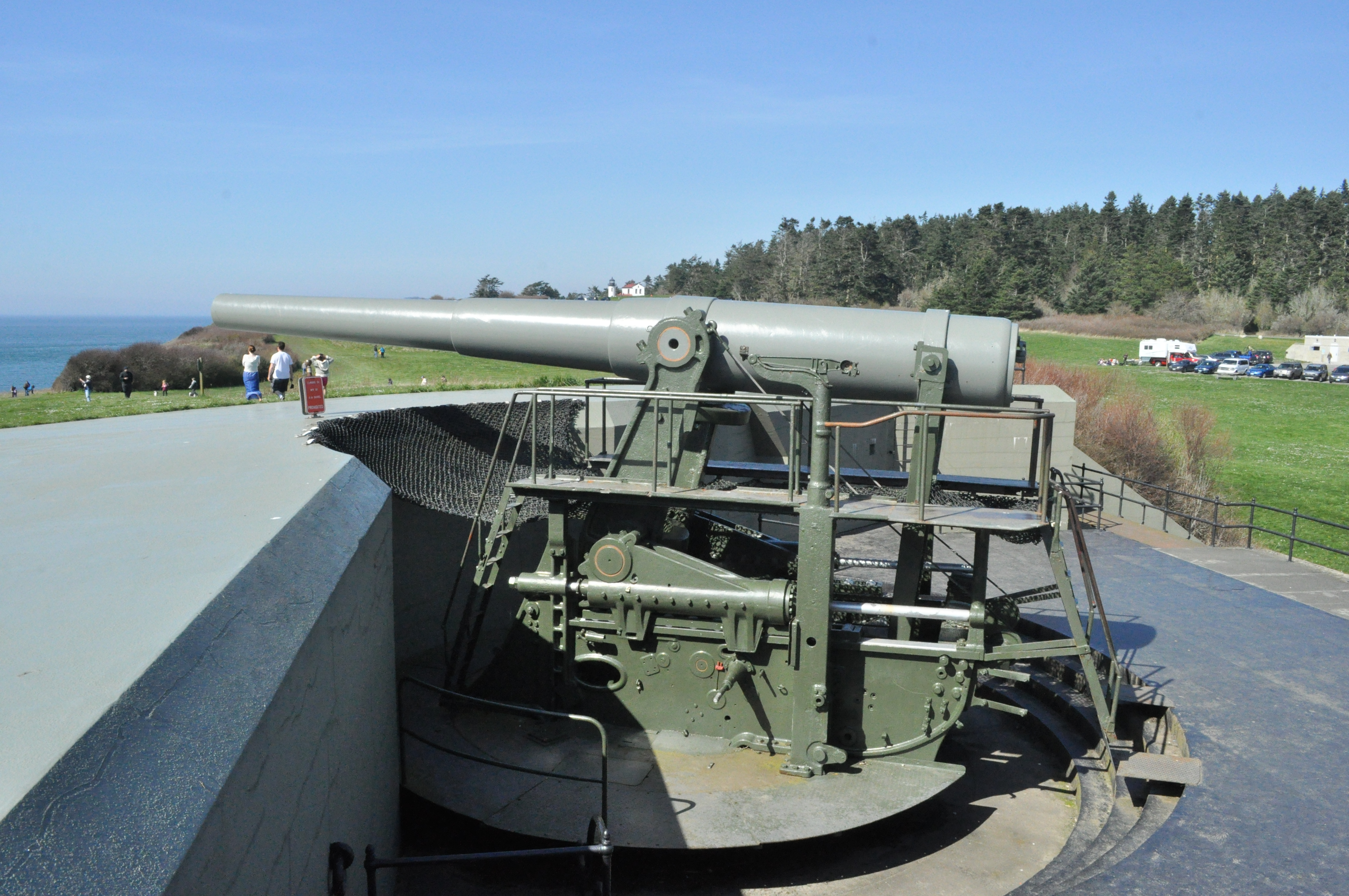
- 10-inch disappearing gun at Fort Casey, Washington state, similar to those at Fort Williams.

Site information
- Type: Coastal Defense
- Owner: Town of Cape Elizabeth, Maine
- Controlled by: Town of Cape Elizabeth
- Open to the public: yes

Location
- Location in Maine Fort Williams (the United States)
- Coordinates: 43°37′24″N 70°12′40″W

Site history
- Built: 1898
- Built by: United States Army
- In use: 1898-1962
- Battles/wars: World War I; World War II; Cold War

Fort Williams is a former United States Army fort in Cape Elizabeth, Maine which operated from 1872 to 1964. It was part of the Coast Defenses of Portland, later renamed the Harbor Defenses of Portland, a command which protected Portland's port and naval anchorage 1904–1950. After its closure, it was redeveloped into Fort Williams Park.

== History ==
=== Endicott Period ===
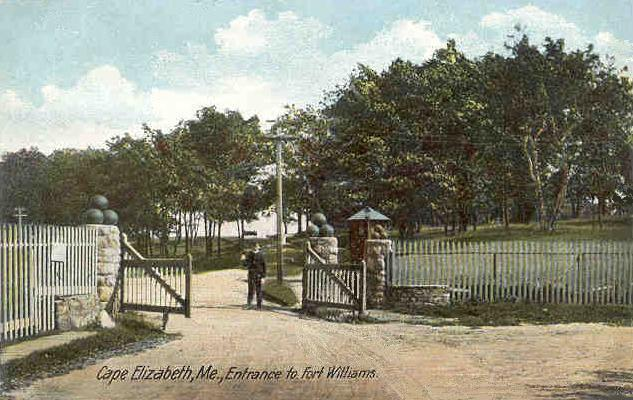
Entrance to Fort Williams, circa 1907

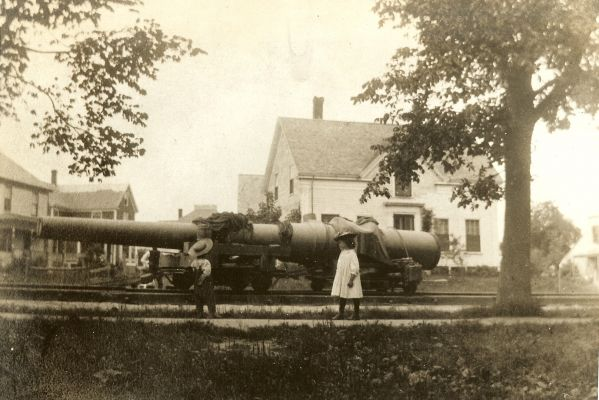
Children look on as a heavy gun is moved to Fort Williams via South Portland's trolley tracks.

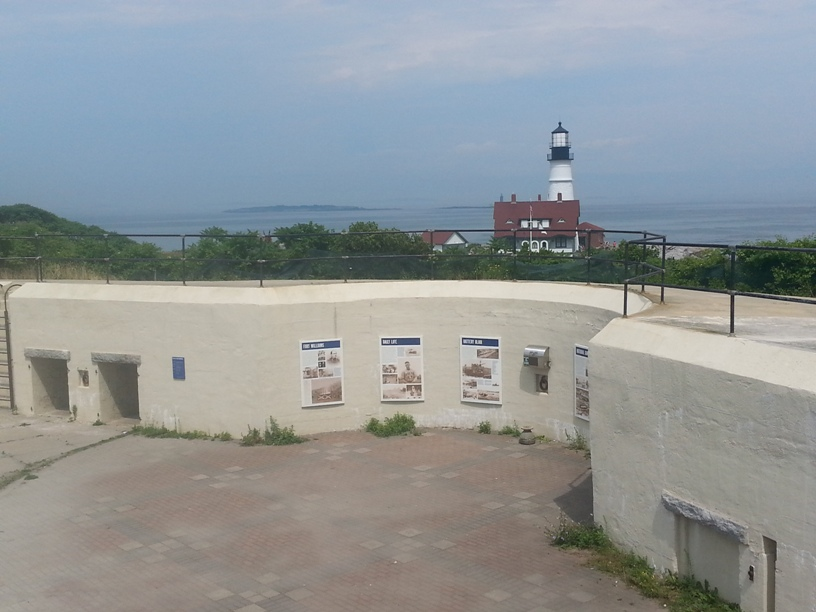
Battery Blair 12-inch disappearing gun emplacement in 2016 with Portland Head Light

A 14-acre purchase near Portland Head Light in 1872 served to establish a sub-post to Fort Preble located at Spring Point. This fortification became known as Fort Williams on 13 April 1899, by order of Army Headquarters (General Order No. 17, Headquarters of the Army, Adjutant General's Office, Washington, D.C.). It was named for Brevet Major General Seth Williams. By 1903, the fort had grown to 90.45 acres.

The Board of Fortifications, often called the Endicott Board, recommended a comprehensive program of new fortifications in 1885. Fort Williams was one of the results. It first test-fired its guns in 1898, shortly before the outbreak of the Spanish–American War, and was complete by 1906.

As built, the fort contained three batteries: Battery Sullivan (two 10-inch guns on disappearing carriages), Battery DeHart (three 10-inch disappearing guns), and Battery Hobart (one 6-inch Armstrong gun), all built between 1896 and 1898. Three other 2-gun batteries were added later: Battery Blair, 2 12-inch disappearing guns (1903); Battery Garesché, 2 6-inch disappearing guns (1906); and Battery Keyes, 2 3-inch rapid-firing guns (1906), the latter to guard a minefield. The remains of a wharf for loading mine planters can be seen near Battery Keyes. An underground bunker for the submarine mine system, later used in Cold War civil defense, is near Battery Hobart. Searchlights were also mounted at some of these batteries; the counterweight for a disappearing searchlight tower (it "disappeared" when folded down) remains on site.

Between 1900 and 1911, most of Fort Williams' support buildings were constructed, including enlisted barracks, non-commissioned officers' quarters, commissioned officers' quarters (Officers' Row), hospital, gymnasium, post exchange, bakery, abattoir, commissary, laundry, chapel, fire station, Fort headquarters, and other buildings including garages and storage sheds. Infrastructure included an electrical substation, a bunkered telephone switchboard, and pumps and underground storage tanks for gasoline and fuel oil. Recreational facilities included a baseball diamond with concrete bleachers, and clubs (the enlisted non-commissioned officers' club utilized the basement of the already existing Goddard mansion, purchased by the government and added to the property).

In 1913, the 6-inch Armstrong gun of Battery Hobart was removed and transferred to Hawaii.

=== World War I ===
During World War I, the fort was fully manned by artillery companies of the Coast Artillery Corps and Maine National Guard troops. Anti-aircraft guns were added to the defenses during this time. In 1917, the two 10-inch guns of Battery Sullivan and both 6-inch guns of Battery Garesché were removed to be shipped to the Western Front in France, but of the four guns only one of the 6-inch guns was actually sent to France. The 10-inch guns were intended to serve as railway artillery, but few guns of this type were so mounted, none saw action in France (though some were mounted there), and the 10-inch railway gun program was abandoned soon after the war. A history of the Coast Artillery in World War I states that none of the regiments in France equipped with 6-inch guns completed training in time to see action before the Armistice. The three 10-inch guns of Battery DeHart were also dismounted, but were soon remounted. After the war, the 10-inch guns were returned to Fort Williams, but Battery Garesché remained disarmed.

=== Interwar ===
A plaque next to one of the fort's remaining buildings states that it housed towed 155 mm guns following World War I. These weapons, based on the French 155 mm GPF gun used by the Coast Artillery in that war, were adopted to introduce mobility to US coast defenses. Circular concrete platforms called "Panama mounts" were constructed at Fort Baldwin in Phippsburg, Maine and at Biddeford Pool to allow more effective use of these guns. Battery D of the 8th Coast Artillery, with four of these weapons (most likely from Fort Williams) was deployed to Fort Baldwin from early 1942 to 17 January 1944. Another battery of two 155 mm guns was deployed to the Biddeford Pool Military Reservation from 1942 through 1945.

In 1923, the 5th Infantry Regiment (United States) was stationed at Fort Williams as part of the 18th Infantry Brigade of the 9th Division. The regiment was reassigned to the 5th Division on 15 August 1927 but returned on 1 October 1933 to the 9th Division. On 23 October 1939, the 3rd Battalion sailed from Portland, ME, on the USAT Chateau Thierry as part of the 18th Infantry Brigade force sent to reinforce the Panama Canal Zone.

=== World War II and postwar ===
Fort Williams served as the headquarters of the Harbor Defenses of Portland throughout World War II, by the middle of which the last of the coastal artillery pieces (except Battery Keyes' two 3-inch guns) were removed due to age and obsolescence. In early World War II the major units garrisoning the Harbor Defenses of Portland were the 8th Coast Artillery Regiment of the Regular Army and the 240th Coast Artillery Regiment of the Maine National Guard. By 1945 the fort was replaced by the 16-inch Battery Steele on Peaks Island and a few other more recent batteries. Fort Williams received its last guns in 1943, in the form of four 90 mm dual-purpose guns of Anti-Motor Torpedo Boat Battery (AMTB) 961, the emplacements for two of which remain a bit south of the lighthouse. With little threat to the East Coast from surface ships by 1944, the coast defenses were drawn down and the Coast Artillery regiments reduced to battalions or their personnel were reassigned. In January 1950, with the dissolution of the Coast Artillery Corps, Fort Williams' mission was officially changed from a harbor defense post to a logistical and administrative support installation for all military units and personnel in the State of Maine.

=== Radar station ===
In 1950-51 Fort Williams hosted a station of the Air Defense Command's Lashup Radar Network. The station was called Site L-2 and had a TPS-1B radar operated by the 657th Aircraft Control and Warning Squadron from January–September 1951. The radar station was deactivated in October 1951 and Fort Williams became an Air National Guard training site. Other Air Force units stationed at Fort Williams included the 127th AC&W Squadron September 1951-September 1953 and the 677th AC&W Squadron September 1953-April 1954.

=== Closure ===
On Saturday, 30 June 1962, Fort Williams officially closed and was turned over to the General Services Administration to be sold. The property was sold to the Town of Cape Elizabeth on 1 December 1964. Many of the fort's buildings were gradually torn down, though several structures remain, either intact or as preserved ruins. Most of the concrete bunkers and gun emplacements were backfilled, although Batteries Keyes, Hobart, and Garesche survive relatively intact, and the outlines of all the other emplacements are preserved on the surface. One of the two emplacements of Battery Blair was recently partly unearthed again, with its upper surfaces cleaned and painted and interpretive signage added; plans are being made to restore Blair's second emplacement in like manner.

== Present ==
After proposals ranging from a Coastal Science Park to low-income housing, the Cape Elizabeth Town Council designated Fort Williams on 23 July 1979, as Fort Williams Park. The park has been maintained for residents and non-residents for a small parking fee. Recreational facilities include two tennis courts, a basketball court, baseball diamond, a course for physical fitness, picnic tables and cookout facilities, a picnic shelter, a children's garden, and recreational opportunities for walking, running, and dogwalking. All visitors to Portland Head Light pass through the park, adding to its visibility. The Beach to Beacon 10K is one of the park's largest events of the year.

== See also ==
- Cape Elizabeth, Maine
- Casco Bay
- Port of Portland (Maine)
- Seacoast defense in the United States
- United States Army Coast Artillery Corps
- List of coastal fortifications of the United States
