= C. A. Brown Cottage =

Historic house in Maine, United States

- U.S. National Register of Historic Places
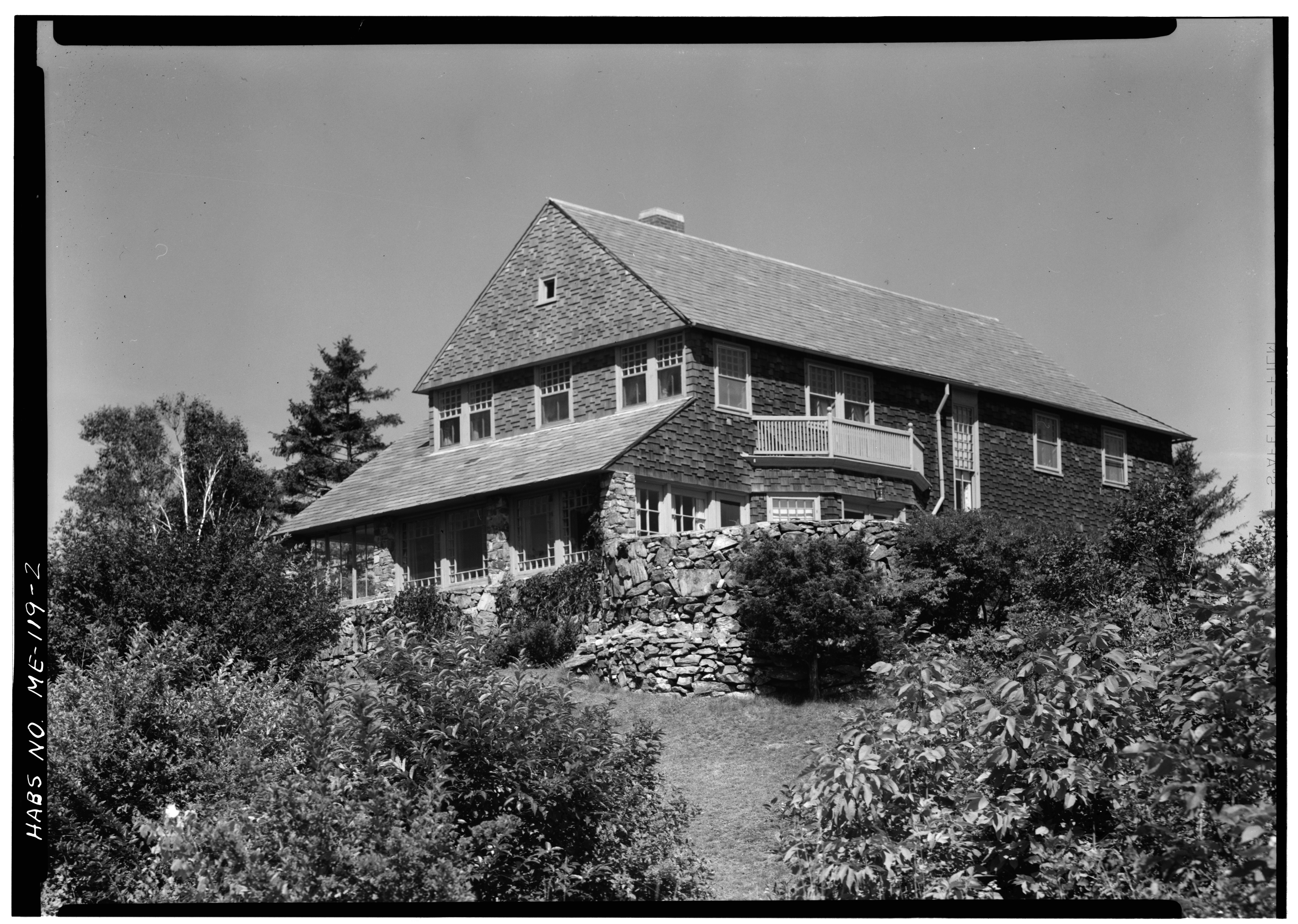

- Location within Maine Location within the United States
- Location: 9 Delano Park, Cape Elizabeth, Maine
- Coordinates: 43°37′11″N 70°12′40″W
- Area: 2 acres (0.81 ha)
- Built: 1886
- Architect: John Calvin Stevens
- Architectural style: Shingle Style
- NRHP reference No.: 74000157
- Added to NRHP: July 30, 1974

The C.A. Brown Cottage is a historic summer house at 9 Delano Park in Cape Elizabeth, Maine. Built in 1886–87, it is a fine local example of the Shingle Style then popular for such properties, and is an important mature work in that style of Portland architect John Calvin Stevens. The house was listed on the National Register of Historic Places in 1974.

== Description and history ==
The C.A. Brown Cottage is located on the eastern shore of Cape Elizabeth, just south of Portland Head Light, overlooking Casco Bay. It is a 2 1/2-story wood-frame structure, with a weathered wood shingle exterior and a fieldstone foundation. It is basically rectangular in plan, with a double-gable roof whose gables are joined by a higher cross gable. The end of the cross gable projects over a porch recessed under a continuation of the roofline of the other gable, with stone pier supports. The upper level under the cross gable originally had an open loggia, but this has since been enclosed. An ell extends to the rear, its gambrel roof oriented on the same axis as the transverse gable.

The house was designed by John Calvin Stevens and built in 1886–87. Stevens was a proponent of an organic form of architecture, in which the building materials were harmonized with their surroundings. This is exemplified in this house by the use of fieldstone similar to the bedrock on which the house rests, and the use of wood shingles. The house received favorable publication reviews in architectural publications in 1886 and 1890, and was included by Stevens in his own book.

== See also ==
- National Register of Historic Places listings in Cumberland County, Maine
