= Ram Island Ledge Light =

Lighthouse in Maine, US

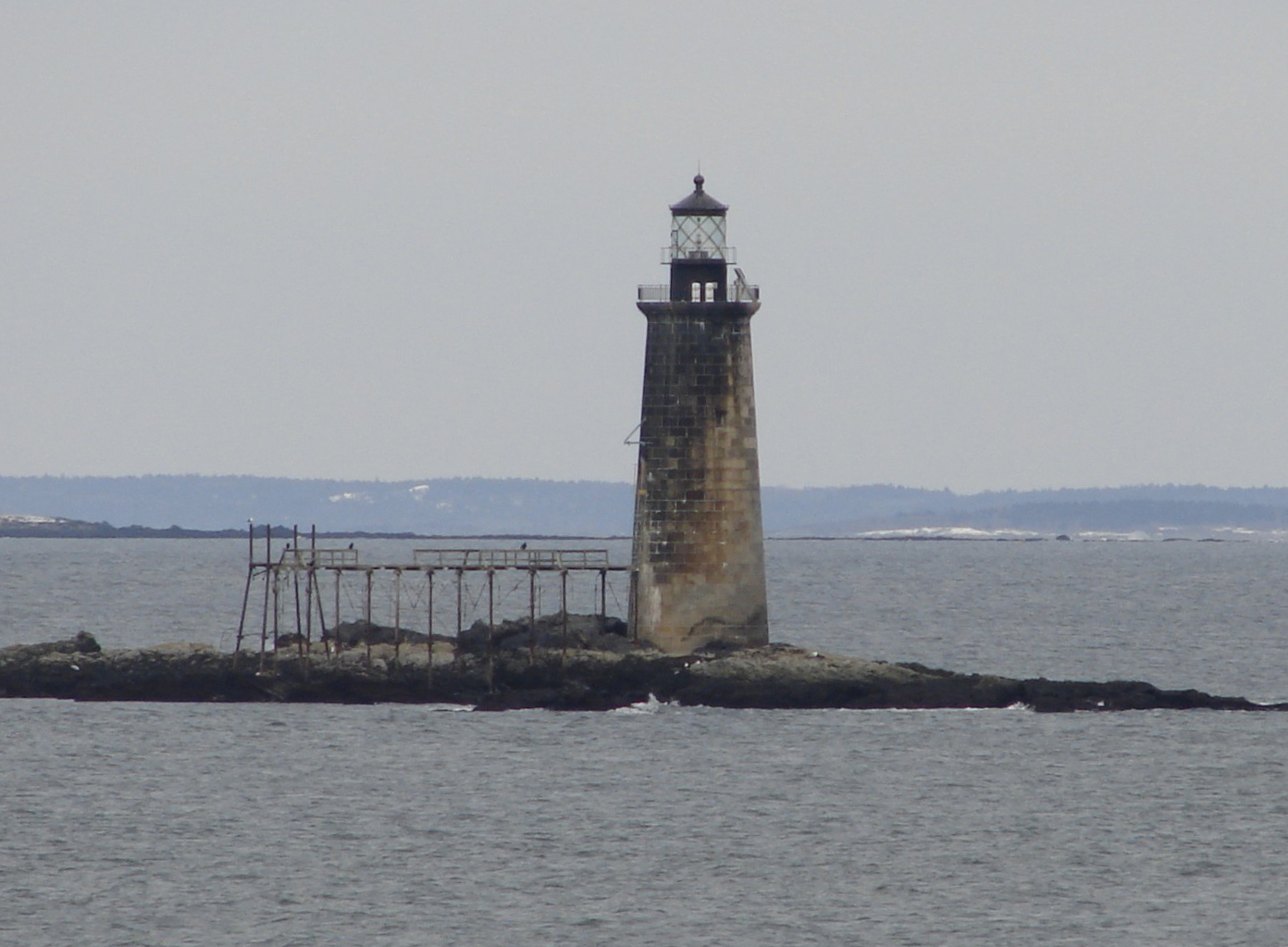
- Ram Island Ledge Light
- Location: Cape Elizabeth, Maine
- Coordinates: 43°37′53.3″N 70°11′14.5″W

Tower
- Constructed: 1905
- Foundation: Natural/emplaced
- Construction: Granite blocks
- Automated: 1959
- Height: 22 m (72 ft)
- Shape: conical
- Markings: Natural (light gray) with black lantern
- Heritage: National Register of Historic Places listed place
- Fog signal: HORN: 1 every 10s

Light
- First lit: 1905
- Focal height: 77 feet (23 m)
- Lens: Third order Fresnel lens
- Range: 8 nautical miles (15 km; 9.2 mi)
- Characteristic: Flashing (2) White 6s
- Ram Island Ledge Light Station
- U.S. National Register of Historic Places
- Architect: US Army Corps of Engineers
- MPS: Light Stations of Maine MPS
- NRHP reference No.: 88000157
- Added to NRHP: March 14, 1988

Ram Island Ledge Light is a lighthouse off Cape Elizabeth, Maine, United States, marking the northern end of the main channel leading the harbor of Portland, Maine.

== History ==
The Ram Island Ledges are a series of stone ledges, some of which break the waters at the southern end of Casco Bay, a short way south of Cushing Island. In 1855 an iron spindle was erected to protect sailors from these dangerous underwater ledges. The ledge continued to be the site of repeated shipwrecks. On February 24, 1900, the Allan Line steamship Californian (formerly named the State of California) ran aground on the ledge while en route from Portland to Glasgow, Scotland via Halifax, Nova Scotia. As a result of that accident, the United States Congress appropriated funds to build a lighthouse.

Construction began on May 1, 1903, and was completed in 1905. It is a twin of the Graves Light off Boston. The lighthouse was built of granite quarried from Vinalhaven, Maine. The lighthouse originally included a third-order Fresnel lens. The lighthouse was electrified in 1958, and then automated in 1959. The light was converted to solar power in January 2001. The Ram Island Ledge Light was added to the National Register of Historic Places as Ram Island Ledge Light Station on March 14, 1988, reference number 88000157.

In July 2010, Ram Island Ledge Light was put up for sale to the general public. The minimum bid was $10,000. The property had initially been made available at no charge to other government agencies, educational institutions, and non-profit organizations, but no interest was shown, so bids were opened to the general public. The winning bid, $190,000, came from Jeffrey Florman, a surgeon and resident of Windham, Maine.

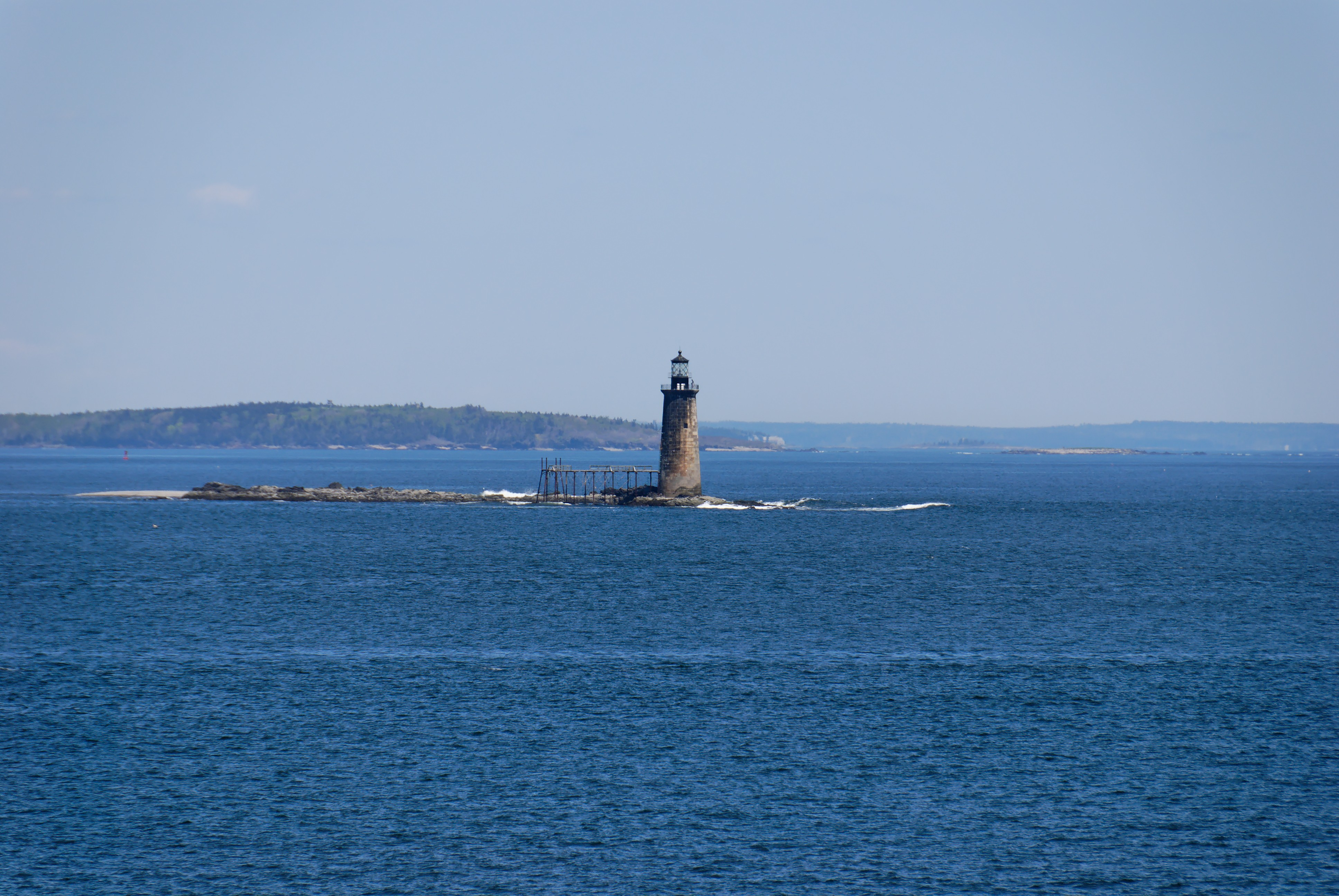
Ram Island Ledge Light

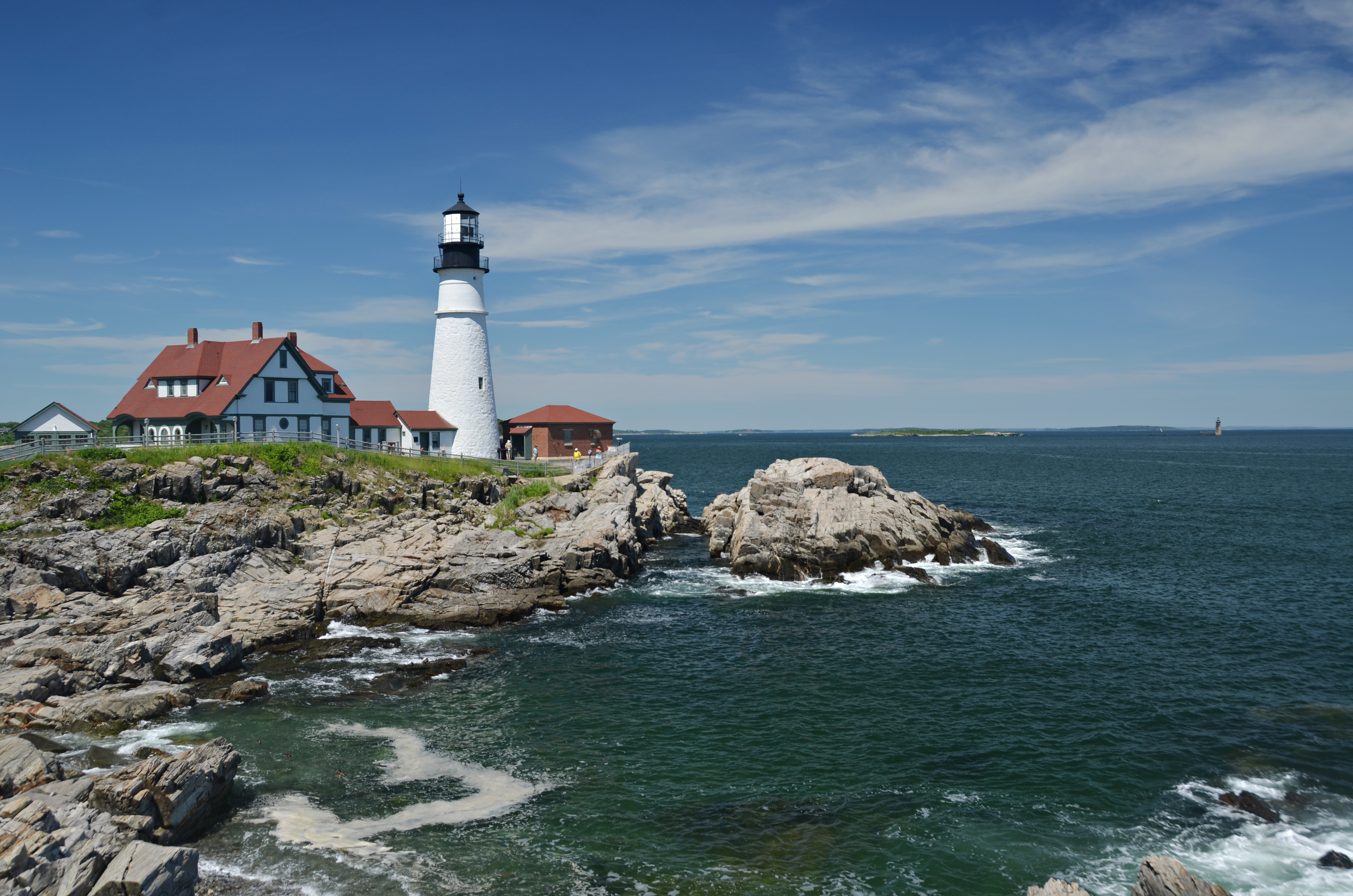
The Ram Island Ledge Light is visible from the Portland Head Light

== See also ==
- National Register of Historic Places listings in Cumberland County, Maine
