= Fort Williams Park =

Park in Maine, United States

Coordinates: 43°37′24″N 070°12′40″W

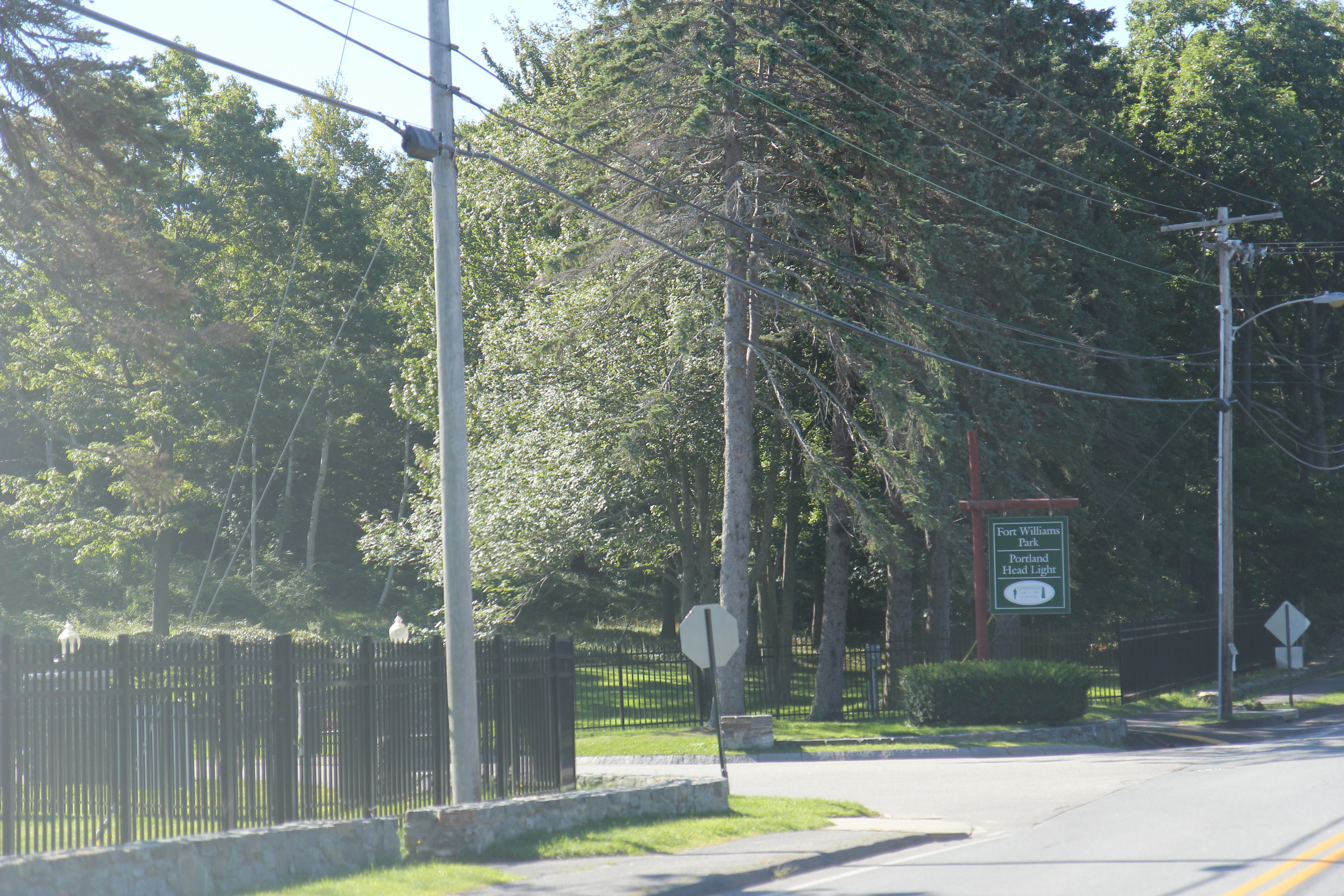
The entrance sign to Fort William Park

Fort Williams Park is a 90-acre park in Cape Elizabeth, Maine, encompassing numerous historical sites. Famous for having Portland Head Light on its grounds, the park also encompasses the decommissioned and largely demolished United States Army post Fort Williams, which was operational during World War I and World War II.

== Historic sites ==
=== Portland Head Light ===
Portland Head Light is a lighthouse inside Fort Williams Park in Cape Elizabeth, Maine. Construction began in 1787 at the directive of George Washington, and was completed on January 10, 1791. Today, Portland Head Light stands 80 feet above ground and 101 feet above water, its white conical tower being connected with a dwelling. The 200,000-candlepower, DCB 224 airport-style aerobeacon is visible from 24 miles away. The grounds and the keeper's house are owned by the town of Cape Elizabeth, while the beacon and fog signal are owned and maintained by the U.S. Coast Guard as a current aid to navigation. It was added to the National Register of Historic Places as Portland Head light [sic] on April 24, 1973, reference number 73000121.

=== Goddard Mansion ===
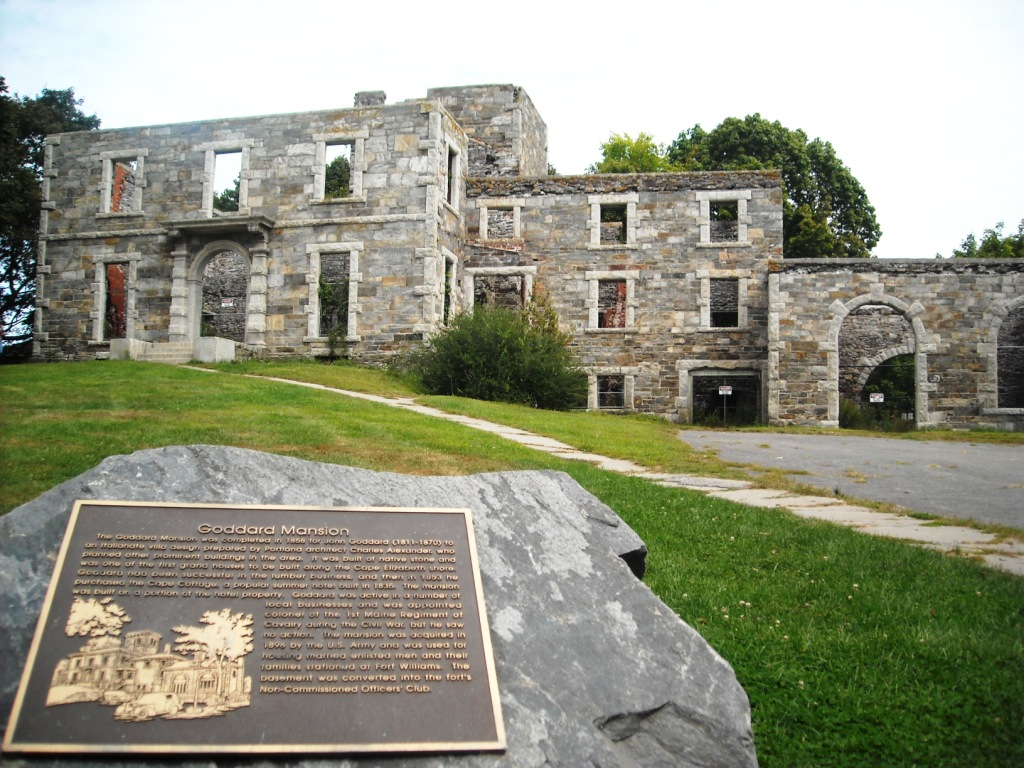
Goddard Mansion

Goddard Mansion, a prominent ruin inside Fort Williams Park, was built in 1853–59 for Colonel John Goddard. Colonel Goddard was a businessman who commanded the 1st Maine Volunteer Cavalry Regiment for three months during the American Civil War. The mansion was purchased in 1898 by Judge Joseph W. Symond. In 1900, it was acquired by the federal government during the expansion of Fort Williams. The mansion was converted to quarters for non-commissioned officers and the basement was used as a non-commissioned officer's club. The building was seriously deteriorated when the Town of Cape Elizabeth took it over in 1962 and the interior had crumbled to the point of being a severe danger so the town did a controller burn of the interior in the 1980s. The mansion's remaining walls still stand on the hill overlooking Fort Williams.

=== Fort Williams ===
A former fort of the United States Army, Fort Williams operated from 1872 to 1964.

=== Fort Williams-War Time ===
Portland Headlight began to transform into a fort in 1896 with the installation of the first battery. By 1898, the first 3 batteries were installed and by 1899, the title was officially Fort Williams. Following the acquisition of additional acreage by the Army in 1900, major expansions took place including a barracks, officers’ quarters, hospital, and more.

With the United States’ involvement in the Great War beginning in 1917, Fort Williams was placed on alert. Prior to the war, each battery, such as Battery Blair, was manned by 3 companies consisting of 80-100 soldiers. Due to catching the tail-end of the war, the German Navy was no longer considered a threat, and many of the soldiers stationed would be sent to Europe.

In 1939 and through much of World War 2, the fort was heavily manned once more by members of the 240th Coastal Artillery Regiment. When test-firing the old batteries the day after the attack on Pearl Harbor, Battery Blair destroyed surrounding property due to the shock blast. By 1944, all of the original batteries and cannons had been removed as the fort was transitioning into an administrative headquarters. Fort Williams remained as an administrative headquarters until 1964, when the town of Cape Elizabeth purchased the property.

== Present ==
In the 1970s the Town of Cape Elizabeth buried close to 90% of the gun batteries to avoid maintenance costs. After proposals ranging from a Coastal Science Park to low-income housing, the Cape Elizabeth Town Council designated Fort Williams on July 23, 1979, as Fort Williams Park. The park has been maintained for residents and non-residents for no fee. Recreational facilities include two tennis courts, eight pickleball courts, a basketball court, baseball diamond, a course for physical fitness, picnic tables and cookout facilities, a picnic shelter, and recreational opportunities for walking, running, and dog walking. All visitors to Portland Head Light pass through the park, adding to its visibility. The Beach to Beacon 10K is the park's largest annual event.

== See also ==
- Cape Elizabeth, Maine
- Casco Bay
- Port of Portland (Maine)
