= Annie C. Maguire =

Barque ship

Coordinates: 43.62283°N 70.20799°W

History

United Kingdom
- Name: Annie C. Maguire
- Launched: 1853
- Fate: Wrecked 24 December 1886

General characteristics
- Type: Barque
- Tonnage: 1,363 tons
- Length: 188 ft (57 m)
- Complement: 14

Annie C. Maguire was a British three-masted barque sailing from Buenos Aires, Argentina, on 24 December 1886, when she struck the ledge at Portland Head Light, Cape Elizabeth, Maine. Lighthouse Keeper Joshua Strout, his son, wife, and volunteers rigged an ordinary ladder as a gangplank between the shore and the ledge against which the ship was heeled. Captain O'Neil, the ship's master, his wife, two mates, and the nine-man crew clambered onto the ledge and then, one by one, crossed the ladder to safety.

The cause of the wreck is puzzling, since visibility was not a problem. Members of the crew reported they "plainly saw Portland Light before the disaster and are unable to account for same."

Today, letters painted on the rocks below the lighthouse commemorate the wreck and the Christmas Eve rescue.

== Gallery ==
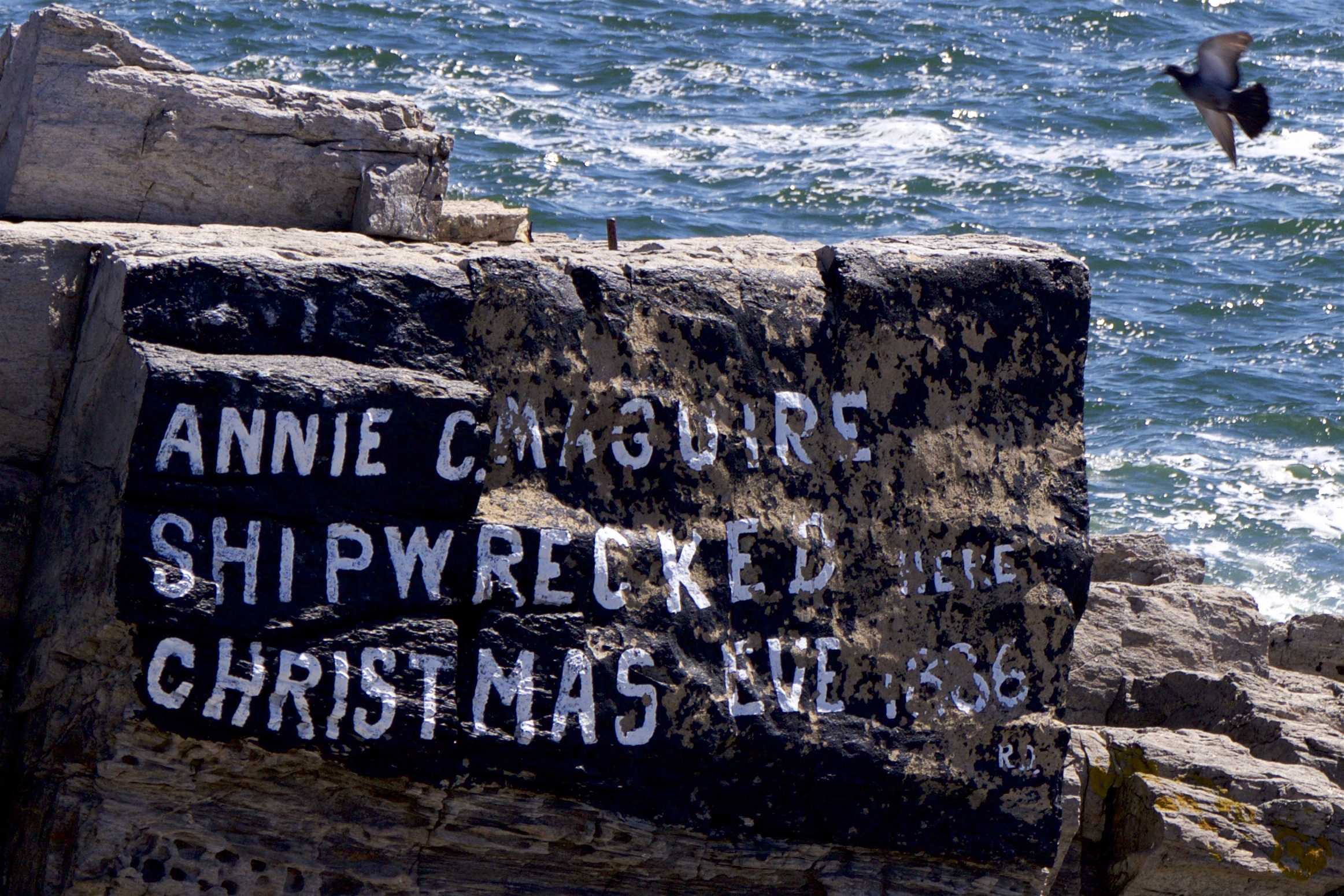
Shipwreck marker, as seen from Portland Head Lighthouse grounds

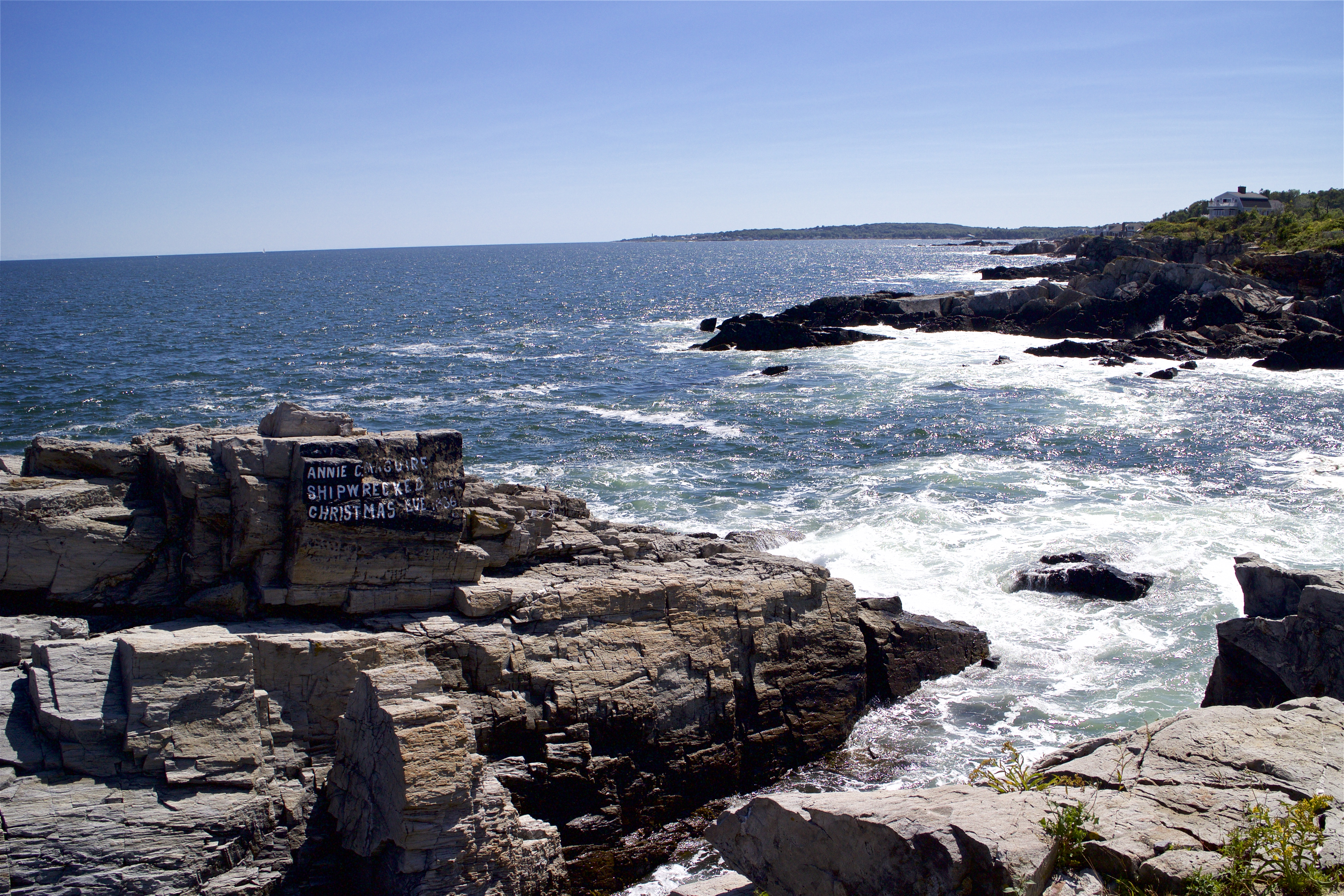
View of Cape Elizabeth including site of 1886 shipwreck
