= Port of Portland =

Port of Portland may refer to:

- Port of Portland (Maine)
- Port of Portland (Oregon)
- Portland, Victoria, Australia
- Portland Harbour, south England
