= Higgins Beach =

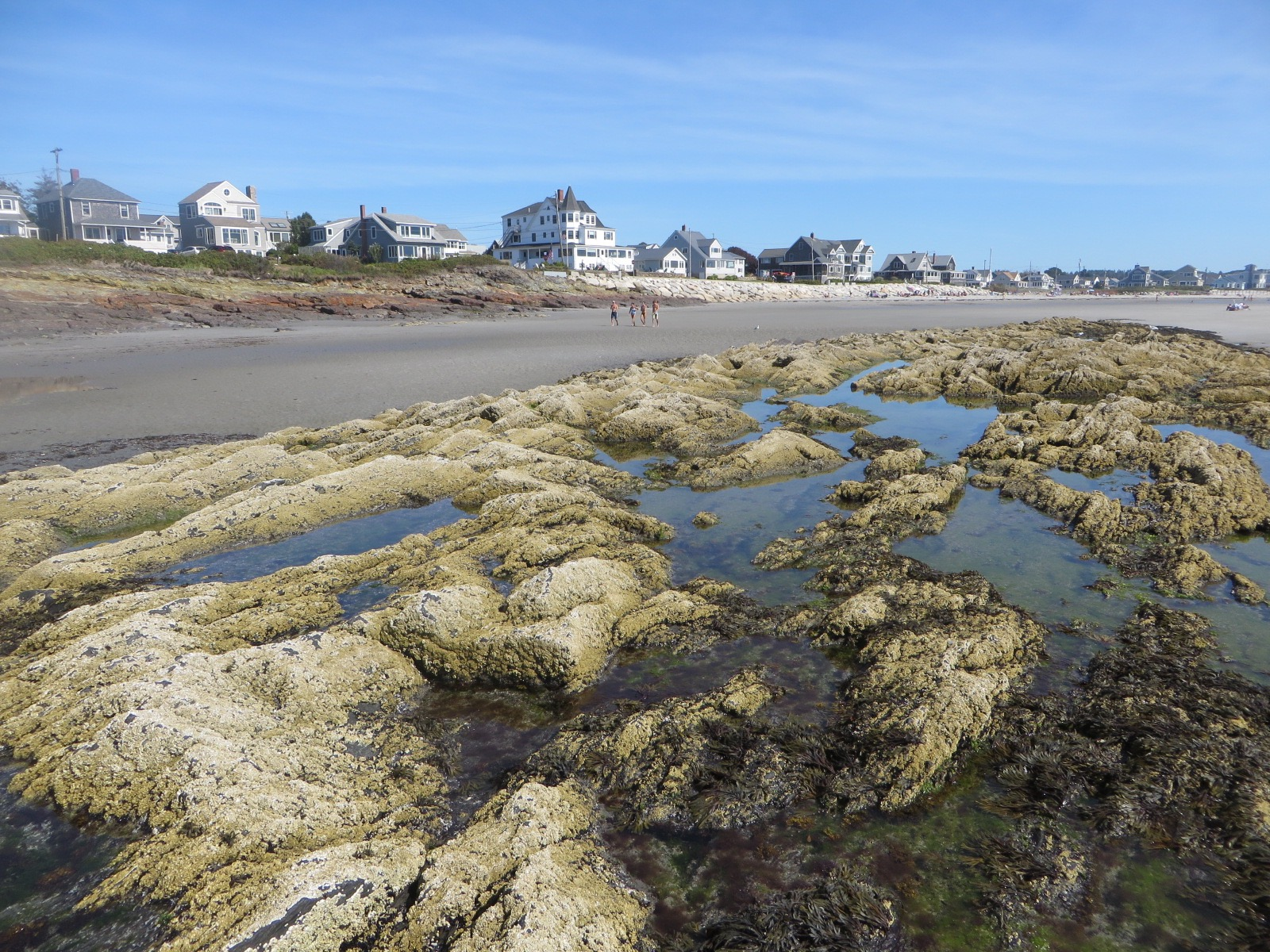
- Higgins Beach at low tide

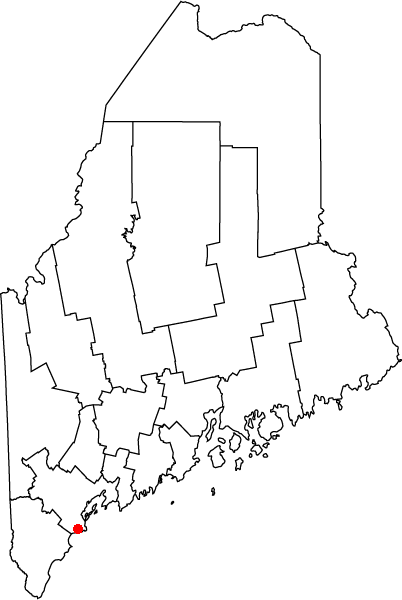
- Location in the state of Maine
- Coordinates: 43°34′N 70°17′W
- Country: United States
- State: Maine
- Elevation: 20 ft (6.1 m)
- Time zone: UTC-5 (EST)
  - Summer (DST): UTC-4 (EDT)

Higgins Beach is a small beach located in the state of Maine, United States. It is located in the town of Scarborough in Cumberland County. The beach is north of Prouts Neck and Old Orchard Beach and south of Crescent Beach State Park.

This northeast-southwest trending beach measures approximately 0.6 miles (1.0 km) and is approximately 7 miles (11 km) south of Portland and 110 miles (177 km) north of Boston. It lies between bedrocks at the southwest, sometimes known as Thunder Cove, and the Spurwink River on the northeastern end. This small seaside community has approximately 300 cottages. In addition, the community has two inns (The Breakers and the Higgins Beach Inn) which are open during the summer season. The Higgins Beach Inn was built in the 1890s as a summer home and was converted to an inn by Edward Higgins around the turn of the 20th century.

Higgins Beach is most known for its family-oriented oceanside neighborhood, striped bass fishing, the beach's quaintness, the shipwreck embedded in the beach's sands, and surfing. Higgins Beach is also known for being a nesting site for the endangered piping plover, which you can often find on the beach.

The beach has had public access for as long as the town has record, but with very little public parking. In 2010, the town of Scarborough purchased a small parking lot accommodating approximately 75 vehicles. There is also limited on-road parking along the town's main road, Ocean Avenue which overlooks the ocean. Higgins Beach has managed to retain at least some of its small-town characteristics, something that larger beaches in the area such as Old Orchard have lost in return for commercialization and tourism. However, residential gentrification has taken place in the neighborhood steadily since the early 2010s, with numerous new and affluent homes recently appearing in the community. However, the vast majority of the neighborhood still survives on the small number of families who have owned property in the area or otherwise returned year after year for decades. Some of its current residents began coming to Higgins Beach in this way.

== Regulations ==
The town regulates some aspects of the beach with Scarborough Police. Between June 15 and September 15, surfing is prohibited from 11 a.m. to 5 p.m.. From May 1 to Labor Day, dogs are not allowed on the sand from 9 a.m. to 5 p.m., after which time, they are required to be on a leash.

== The Shipwreck ==
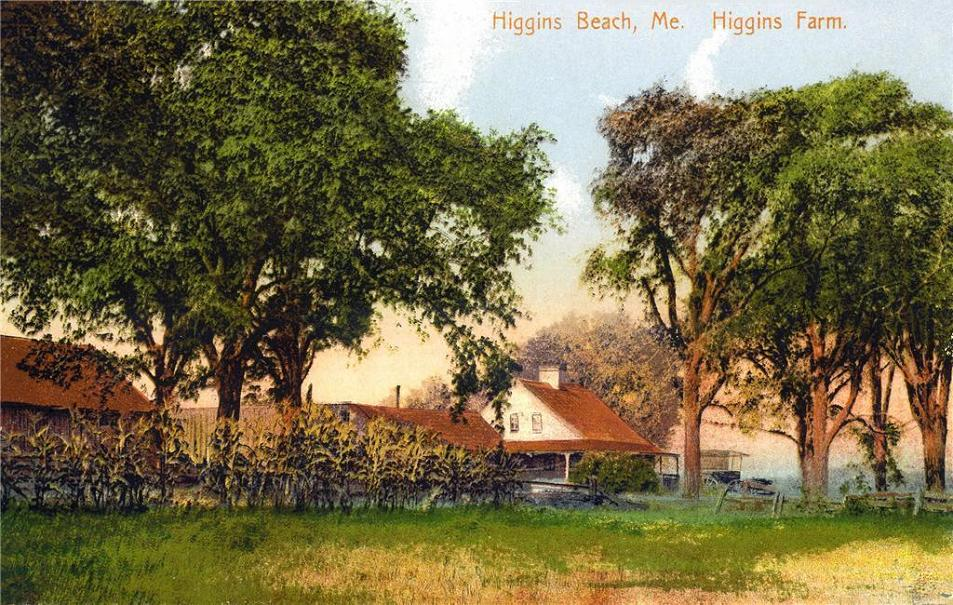
Higgins Farm in 1910

In 1897, a schooner by the name of the Howard W. Middleton sailed too close to the shore and became stuck in the sand. Over time, the tide has partially submerged the ship. The remains of the shipwreck are visible when the water recedes at low tide, leaving behind the worn timber of the vessel.
