= Spurwink Congregational Church =

Historic church in Maine, United States

- U.S. National Register of Historic Places
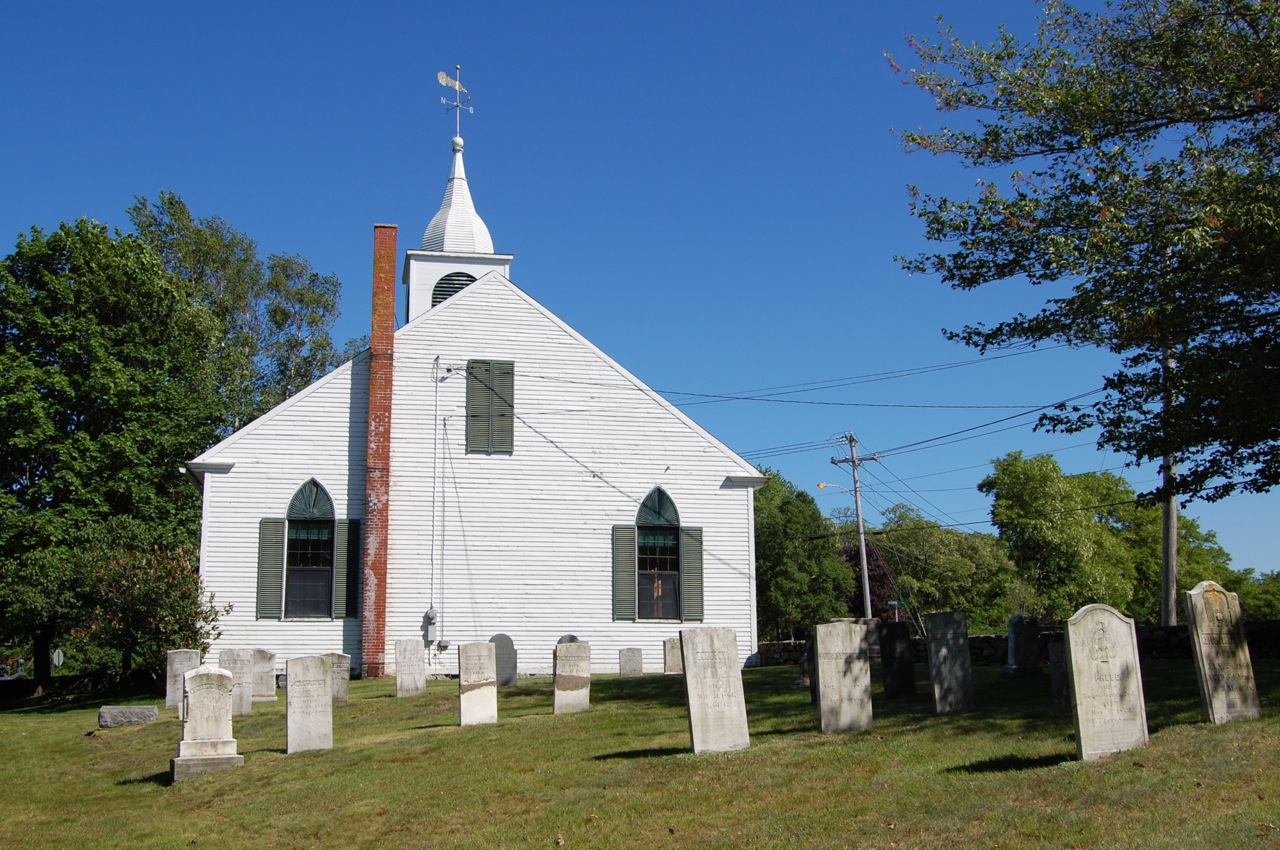

- Location within Maine Location within the United States
- Location: 533 Spurwink Ave., Cape Elizabeth, Maine
- Coordinates: 43°34′47″N 70°15′8″W
- Area: 0.5 acres (0.20 ha)
- Built: 1802
- NRHP reference No.: 70000044
- Added to NRHP: May 19, 1970

Spurwink Congregational Church is a historic church at 533 Spurwink Avenue in Cape Elizabeth, Maine. Built in 1802 and significantly renovated in 1830, it is the town's oldest public building. Home to an active congregation until 1957, it is now owned by the town, serving as a community function space. It was listed on the National Register of Historic Places in 1970.

== Description and history ==
The Spurwink Church is set on a rise above the Spurwink River in western Cape Elizabeth, at the junction of Spurwink Avenue and Bowery Beach Road (Maine State Route 77). It is a basically rectangular wood-frame building, with a gabled roof, clapboard siding, and a granite foundation. A gabled entry vestibule projects from the front, with a square two-stage tower rising above the line between it and the main block. The tower has a plain first stage, and then a belfry with round-arch louvered openings, and a dome-shaped spire and weathervane at the top. The vestibule section is very plain, with a fully pedimented gable, and a pair of entrances, each flanked by pilasters and topped by an entablature and cornice. Windows appear on the sides and rear of the building, most with a Gothic arched fan as a decorative element above. The interior retains significant original finishes, including box pews and a kerosene-powered chandelier.

The original congregation was formed as a branch of the second parish of South Portland. However, South Portland was part of Cape Elizabeth until 1895. The church was built in 1802, and underwent a significant renovation in 1830. The church became independent in 1905, and had an active (but declining) population until 1957, when the building was turned over to the town.

== See also ==
- National Register of Historic Places listings in Cumberland County, Maine
