= Portland–Montreal pipeline =

Underground US-Canada crude oil pipelines

Portland–Montreal Pipe Line
- Portland Pipeline marine terminal in South Portland, ME

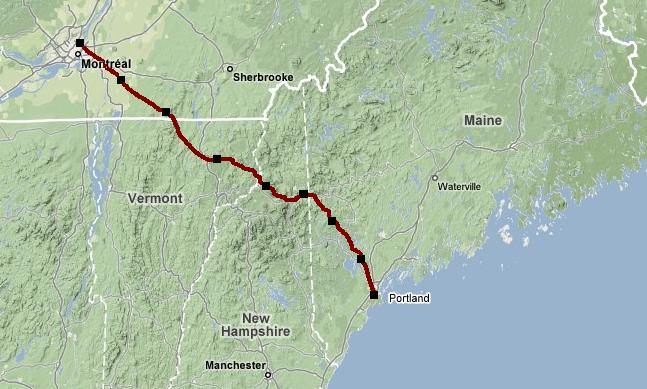
- Map of Portland–Montreal Pipe Line

Location
- Country: United States; Canada
- Coordinates: 45.6340°N 73.5297°W
- Start: South Portland, Maine, United States
- To: Montreal, Quebec, Canada

General information
- Type: Crude oil
- Operator: Portland Pipe Line Corporation (in the United States); Montreal Pipe Line Limited (in Canada)
- Commissioned: 1941

Technical information
- Length: 236 mi (380 km)
- Diameter: 24 in (610 mm)

The Portland Montreal Pipeline is a series of underground crude oil pipelines connecting South Portland, Maine, in the United States with Montreal, Quebec, in Canada. As of early 2016, the pipeline transports limited volumes, sufficient to keep the pipeline wet. The pipeline also supplied crude oil to the Suncor Montreal-Est refinery during supply interruptions due to the 2016 Fort McMurray wildfires.

== History ==
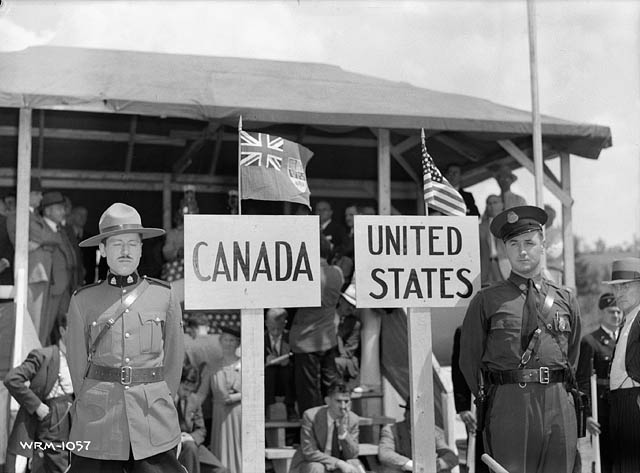
A Royal Canadian Mounted Police constable and a Vermont State Police trooper stand on the border before the official ceremony commemorating the joining of the pipeline.

The pipeline traces its history to the early years of World War II when oil shipments to Canada were severely disrupted by the Kriegsmarine during the Battle of the St. Lawrence and the larger Battle of the Atlantic. In order to safely transport oil to central Canada, a pipeline was proposed to connect the relatively secure Port of Portland in Maine with refineries in Montreal.

The marine terminal was built on the south side of the Fore River in the city of South Portland immediately downstream of the Portland Terminal Company's railroad bridge over the river. The pipeline route from Portland to Montreal was mostly built alongside the existing right of way for the Portland - Montreal rail line which was owned at that time by the Canadian National Railways (CNR) and called the CNR's Berlin Subdivision. This rail line was built in the 1850s by the Atlantic & St. Lawrence Railroad which was purchased by the Grand Trunk Railway shortly after completion. The Grand Trunk Railway encountered financial difficulties after World War I, and the company was nationalized by the Government of Canada in 1923 with its properties merged into the CNR.

Construction of the original pipeline was finished in 1941, and the transportation of oil to Montreal began. The pipeline originally consisted of three separate pipes, which crossed through the same common right-of-way. The third and smallest pipe was decommissioned in 1982. Up until 2016, two pipes operated after they underwent renovation. Since it has been in service, the pipeline has pumped over 5 billion barrels (790,000,000 m^{3}) of oil to Montreal refineries. The pipeline was the primary reason that the Port of Portland had the largest volume oil port on the Eastern Seaboard, as more than 200 tankers delivered oil to the pipeline marine terminal annually.

In January 2016, the pipeline flow was slowed to a trickle. Its volume had been decreasing for several years. The completion of a major pipeline project connecting the Montreal refineries to Alberta oil sands and Bakken light sweet crude sources and the closure of the Shell Montreal-Est refinery made oil transportation from Maine unnecessary. According to consulting firm Turner, Mason & Co., "there is no need to move crude oil from Portland to Montreal. That is a permanent change." Any future use of the pipeline would be in the other direction. The pipeline continues to see some use.

== Details ==
Oil is transported by oil tankers to South Portland, where it was pumped ashore to a 100-acre (0.40 km^{2}) tank farm along South Portland's waterfront. The facility includes 23 oil tanks and a capacity of 3.5 million barrels (560,000 m^{3}) of crude oil. The oil was then pumped through two separate pipelines, one of which is 18 inches (460 mm) in diameter and the other of which is 24 inches (610 mm) in diameter. The pipeline extends 236 miles (380 km), 3 feet (0.91 m) beneath the surface, and has several pump stations distributed throughout the line. The pipeline crosses into the mountains of New Hampshire and Vermont, eventually passing under the St. Lawrence River, extending into Montreal. From South Portland to Montreal, it took between 36 and 43 hours for the oil to reach its destination for refining.

There is a third decommissioned line, 12 inches (300 mm) in diameter. Lines not being used are filled with nitrogen, an inert gas.

== Expansion and line reversal proposal ==
The Portland Pipe Line Corporation/Montreal Pipe Line Limited announced in February 2008 that it was studying a proposal to expand and/or reverse the flow of the Portland–Montreal Pipe Line. Crude oil reserves are undergoing increased development in western Canada, namely raw bitumen from the Athabasca oil sands deposit. The pipeline owner alleges that the proposed plan would open up international markets to Canadian petroleum companies and would require an estimated $100 million in modifications to the pipeline and South Portland marine terminal facilities.

== South Portland Clear Skies Ordinance ==
A citizen-led initiative in August 2013 submitted a proposed city ordinance to the South Portland city council, via a petition. The "Waterfront Protection Ordinance" aimed to ban future Canadian oil sands products from a reversed pipeline from being exported through the city's port. The city council voted against enacting the ordinance, which forced it to a public referendum that November. Five of the seven councilors opposed the ordinance as being too broad. Despite the support of South Portland mayor Tom Blake, the measure was narrowly defeated in the ballot.

A revised version known as the "Clear Skies Ordinance" was created by a Draft Ordinance Committee, supported by citizen group Protect South Portland. It was passed by city council in July 2014. The ordinance prohibits the bulk loading of crude oil onto tankers in South Portland, where the pipeline terminates. Tom Hardison, vice-president of the Portland Pipe Line Corp., characterized it as a "biased process" and a "vote against jobs, energy and the waterfront".

The Bangor Daily News had reported that "while several cities and towns along the pipeline have adopted nonbinding resolutions protesting the movement of the bituminous oil through their communities, the South Portland ordinance is viewed as the only measure that could actually prevent it."

Danielle Droitsch, of the Natural Resources Defense Council, said the Clear Skies Ordinance would be "very significant" in the fight against oil sands bitumen. The city received a letter from the American Petroleum Institute, a major lobby group, indicating that vigorous legal challenges would be made to overturn it. The oil industry had spent approximately US$650,000 in the fight to defeat the original ordinance.

In February 2015, Portland Pipe Line Co. (PPLC) filed a lawsuit in U.S. District Court to overturn the ordinance as being unconstitutional, and interfering with interstate and international trade. The District Court ruled against PPLC, and PPLC abandoned its appeal of that ruling in July 2021. Since the transport of oil from Maine to Quebec has been stopped, the pipeline is likely to remain inoperational unless the ordinance is overturned.

== Sources ==
- "Portland-Montreal Pipe Line Honored for Maritime Protection", Association of Oil Pipe Lines/American Petroleum Institute, Dec. 2004
