= Jean Ginn Marvin =

American politician

Jean Ginn Marvin is a former state representative in the state of Maine. She represented Cape Elizabeth in the Maine House of Representatives from 1994 to 2000 as a Republican in the 117th, 118th, and 119th Legislatures. During her tenure in the Legislature, Marvin served as Ranking Minority Member of the Business and Economic Development Committee, as well as a member of the Appropriations and Financial Affairs Committee.

After leaving the legislature in 2000, Marvin became the Chair of the Maine Commission on Governmental Ethics and Election Practices. She also serves as the Treasurer of the board of directors for Maine Educational Services.

Marvin studied at Syracuse University and earned an M.A. in public policy from the Muskie School of Public Service at the University of Southern Maine.
