= Seth Williams =

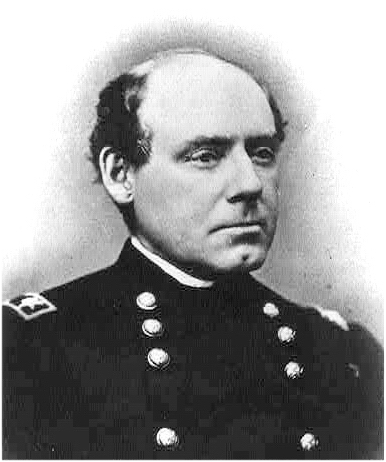
- Brevet Maj. Gen. Seth Williams
- Born: March 22, 1822; Augusta, Maine, U.S.
- Died: March 23, 1866 (aged 44); Boston, Massachusetts, U.S.
- Burial place: Forest Grove Cemetery, Augusta, Maine
- Military career
- Allegiance: United States of America; Union
- Branch: United States Army; Union Army
- Service years: 1842–1866
- Rank: Brigadier General; Brevet Major General
- Conflicts: Mexican-American War; American Civil War

Seth Williams (March 22, 1822 – March 23, 1866) was an American military officer who served as assistant adjutant general of the Union's Army of the Potomac during the American Civil War.

== Early life ==
Williams was born in Augusta, Maine. He graduated from the United States Military Academy in 1842, 23rd in a class of 56. He served as aide-de-camp to General Robert Patterson in the Mexican–American War with the rank of second lieutenant. Williams received a brevet to the rank of captain for his conduct at the Battle of Cerro Gordo as a first lieutenant. He was adjutant at West Point from 1850 to 1853 before moving to the adjutant general's office in Washington, D.C.

== Civil War ==
Williams was promoted to the rank of major in August 1861 and lieutenant colonel on July 7, 1862. On September 28, 1861, President Abraham Lincoln appointed Williams a brigadier general of volunteers, to rank from September 23, 1861. President Lincoln nominated Williams for the promotion on December 21, 1861, and the U.S. Senate confirmed the appointment on July 17, 1862. He was a groomsman at George McClellan's wedding in New York City on May 22, 1860.

Seth Williams served as assistant adjutant general to Major General George B. McClellan in the Department of the Ohio in the summer of 1861. From August 20, 1861, to March 1864, Williams was assistant adjutant general of the Army of the Potomac, responsible for the routine drafting of orders, correspondence, and reports. McClellan named him to that position after unsuccessfully requesting the assignment to Maj. Gen. Fitz John Porter. McClellan and Williams became friends during their service together. Williams was called before the United States Congress Joint Committee on the Conduct of the War to testify about the Battle of Gettysburg. Williams's testimony was especially helpful to Meade.

Williams was a convivial officer to whose quarters other officers resorted for company. Due to this, he was often called "The nicest man in the army."

Williams later served as inspector general on the staff of Lt. Gen. Ulysses S. Grant from the spring of 1864 to February 9, 1866. When Grant decided to recommend surrender to Robert E. Lee during the Appomattox Campaign, it was Williams who took the message to the Confederate lines. He also delivered Grant's terms to the Confederate army. He was present at the surrender on April 9, 1865.

Williams was awarded the brevet of colonel for the Battle of Gettysburg. On January 13, 1866, President Andrew Johnson nominated Williams for the brevet grade of major general of volunteers for his service in 1863 and 1864, to rank from March 13, 1865, and the U.S. Senate confirmed the nomination on March 12, 1866. Although slated to begin service as assistant adjutant general of the Military Division of the Atlantic, Williams became ill later that month and left for Boston. There, he died of a brain ailment described as an "inflammation" on March 23, 1866. He was buried in Augusta's Forest Grove Cemetery. Fort Williams in Cape Elizabeth, Maine, is named for him. The name was assigned on April 13, 1899. On April 10, 1866, President Andrew Johnson nominated Williams posthumously for appointment to the brevet grade of brigadier general in the Regular Army, to rank from March 13, 1865, and the U.S. Senate confirmed the appointment on May 4, 1866. On July 17, 1866, President Johnson nominated Williams posthumously for appointment to the brevet grade of major general in the regular army, to rank from March 13, 1865, and the U.S. Senate confirmed the appointment on July 23, 1866.

== Popular culture ==
Gen. Williams was portrayed by actor Clarence Key in the Spielberg-directed biographical drama Lincoln (2012).

== See also ==
- List of American Civil War generals (Union)
