= Spurwink River =

Coordinates: 43.55786°N 70.27255°W

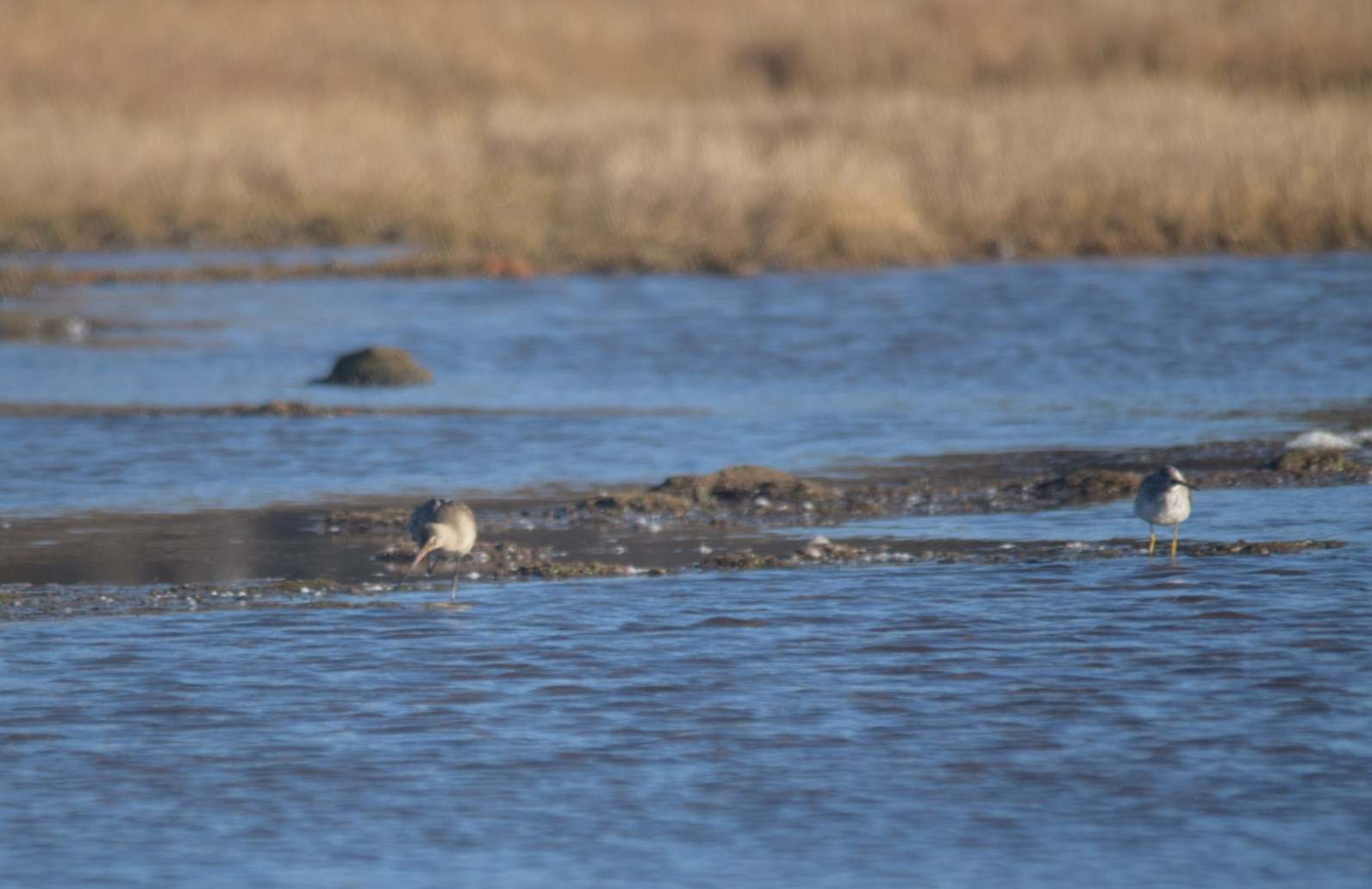
- A Hudsonian godwit (left) and a greater yellowlegs located north of the river.

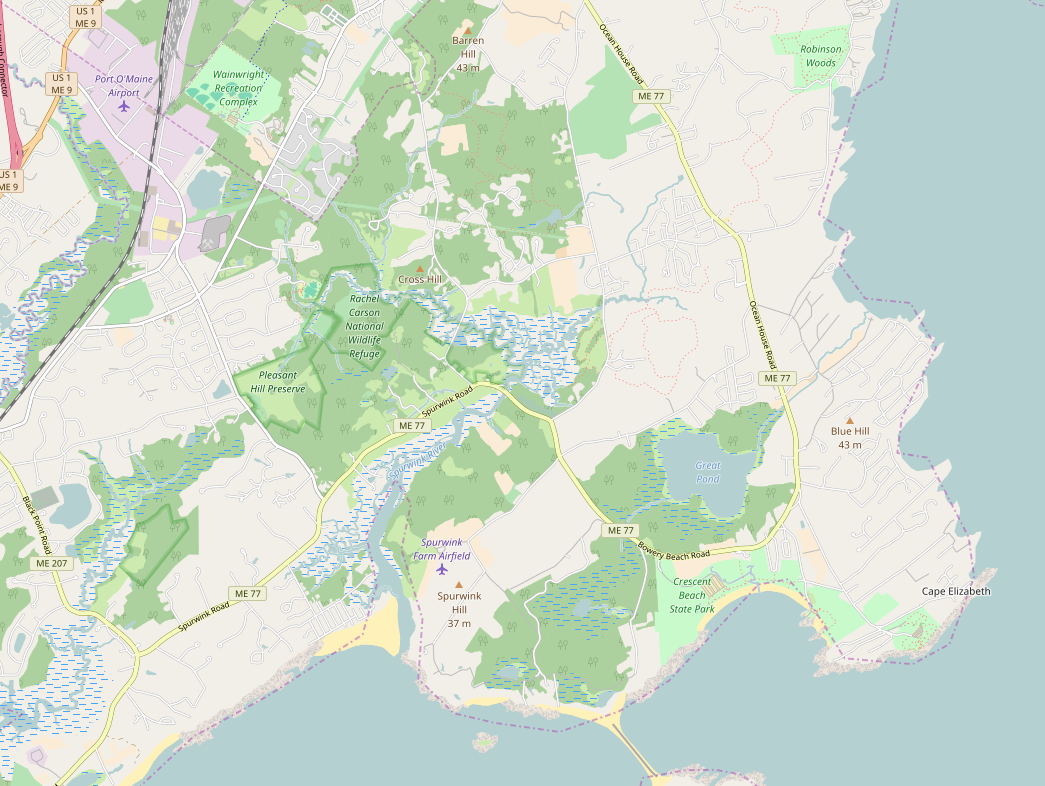

Location
- Country: United States

Physical characteristics
- Source
  - location: Maine
- Length: 4.6 mi (7.4 km)

The Spurwink River is a 4.6-mile-long (7.4 km) primarily tidal river in Cumberland County, Maine. It rises in the town of Cape Elizabeth and flows west, then southwest, through salt marshes to its mouth at the Atlantic Ocean. It is bridged by Maine State Route 77 at the river's approximate halfway point. From a point shortly above the bridge to the river's mouth, it forms the boundary between Cape Elizabeth to the east and the town of Scarborough to the west. The river's mouth is at the Scarborough village of Higgins Beach.

== See also ==
- List of rivers of Maine
