= Crescent Beach State Park =

State park in Cumberland County, Maine

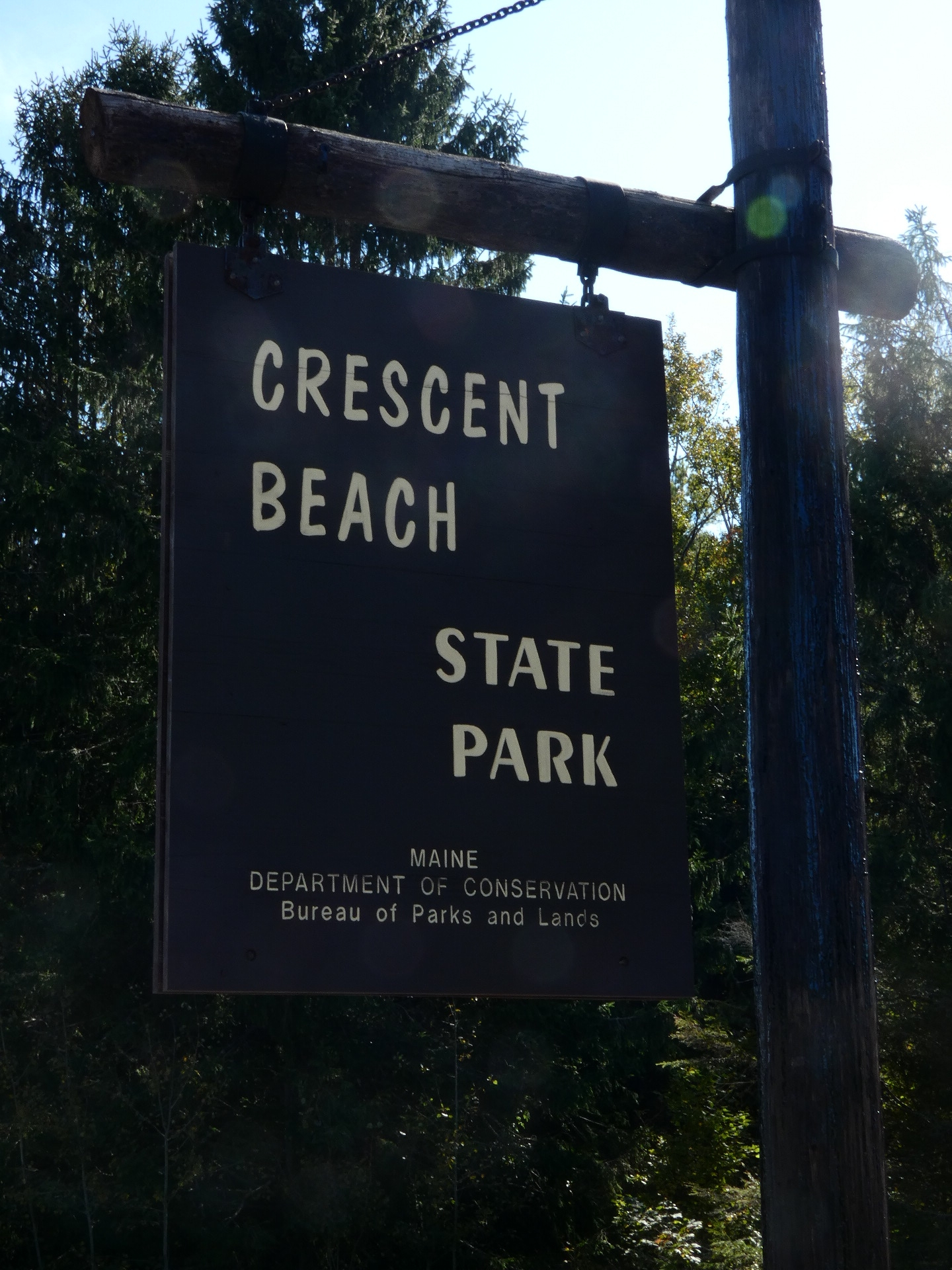

- Location within Maine
- Interactive map of Crescent Beach State Park
- Location: Cape Elizabeth, Maine, United States
- Coordinates: 43°33′53″N 70°13′27″W
- Area: 242 acres (98 ha)
- Elevation: 3 ft (0.91 m)
- Established: 1962; opened 1966
- Administrator: Maine Department of Agriculture, Conservation and Forestry
- Website: Official website
- Maine State Parks

Crescent Beach State Park is public recreation area on the Atlantic Ocean in Cape Elizabeth, Maine, United States. The state park features a mile-long, crescent-shaped beach for swimming and sunbathing, fishing, sea kayaking, and trails for hiking and cross-country skiing.

== Geology ==
The park's 1.4-km pocket beach is subject to erosion from wind and water. Measurable erosion seen in 2005 and 2007 also occurred at the smaller, adjoining pocket beach known as Kettle Cove.

== Ownership ==
The state has leased 100 acres of the park from The Sprague Corporation (owned by the privately held Black Point Corporation) since 1961. In 2013, the state's lease was extended for five years at a cost of $500,000. Under the original 50-year lease, the state paid $1 per year for use of the land, an amount that increased to $10,000 annually with a series of one-year lease extensions that began in 2011. The state has expressed interest in purchasing the entire property, one of the largest revenue-generating parks in Maine, when the current lease expires in 2018. In 2012, the Maine State Employees Association protested the possible privatization of the park by Governor Paul LePage's administration, saying privatization would endanger the entire public park system.

== Gallery ==
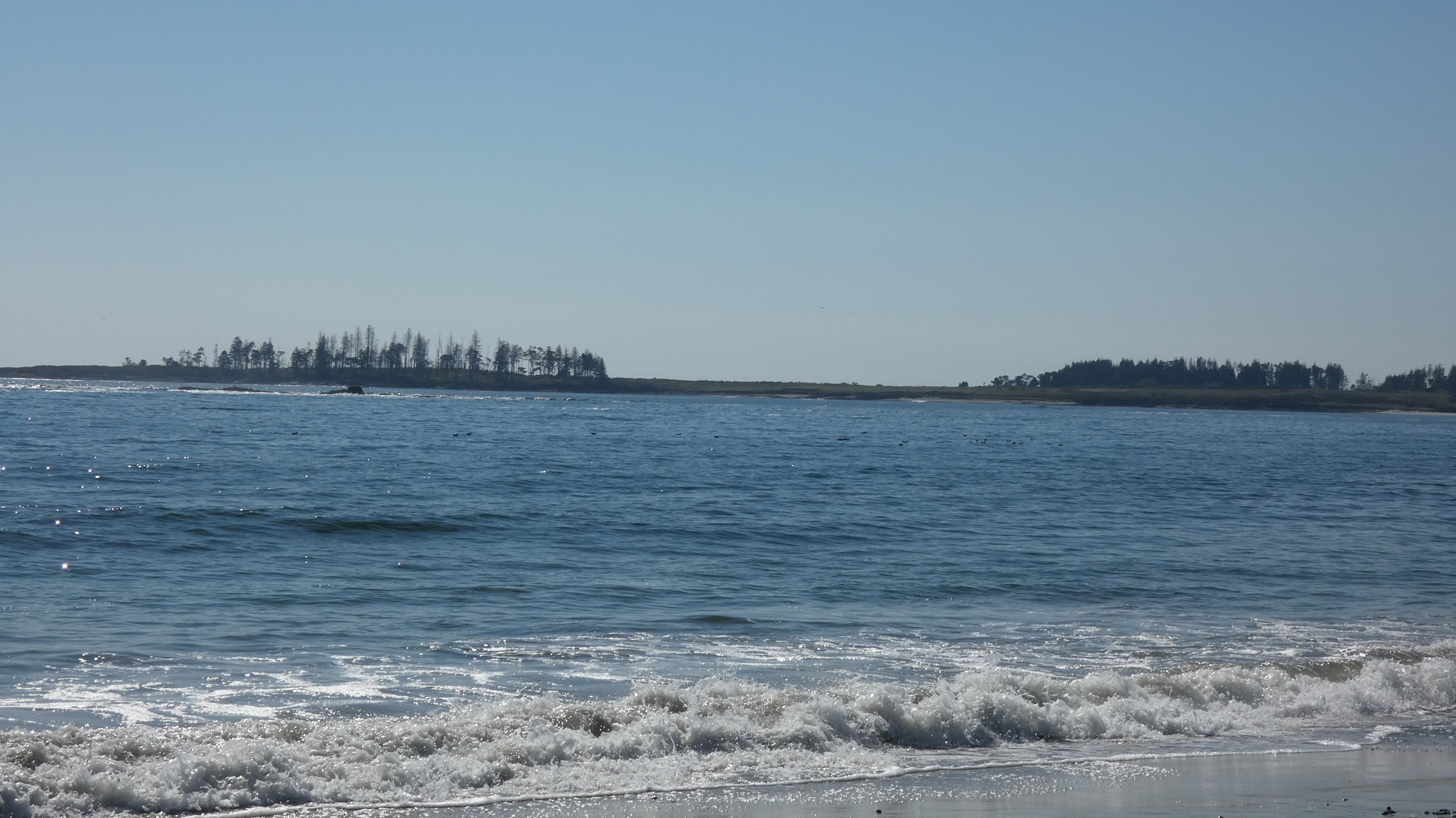

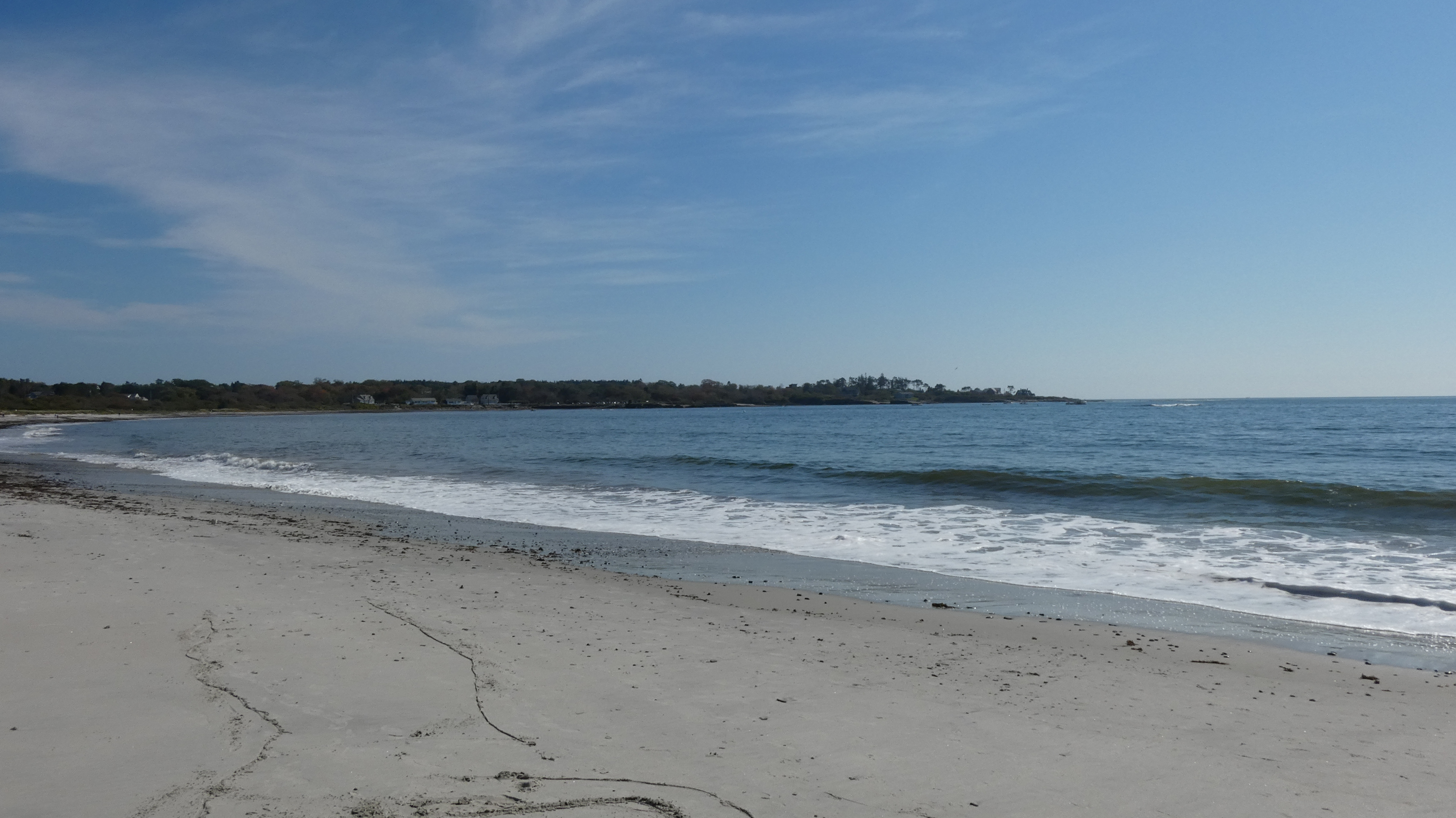

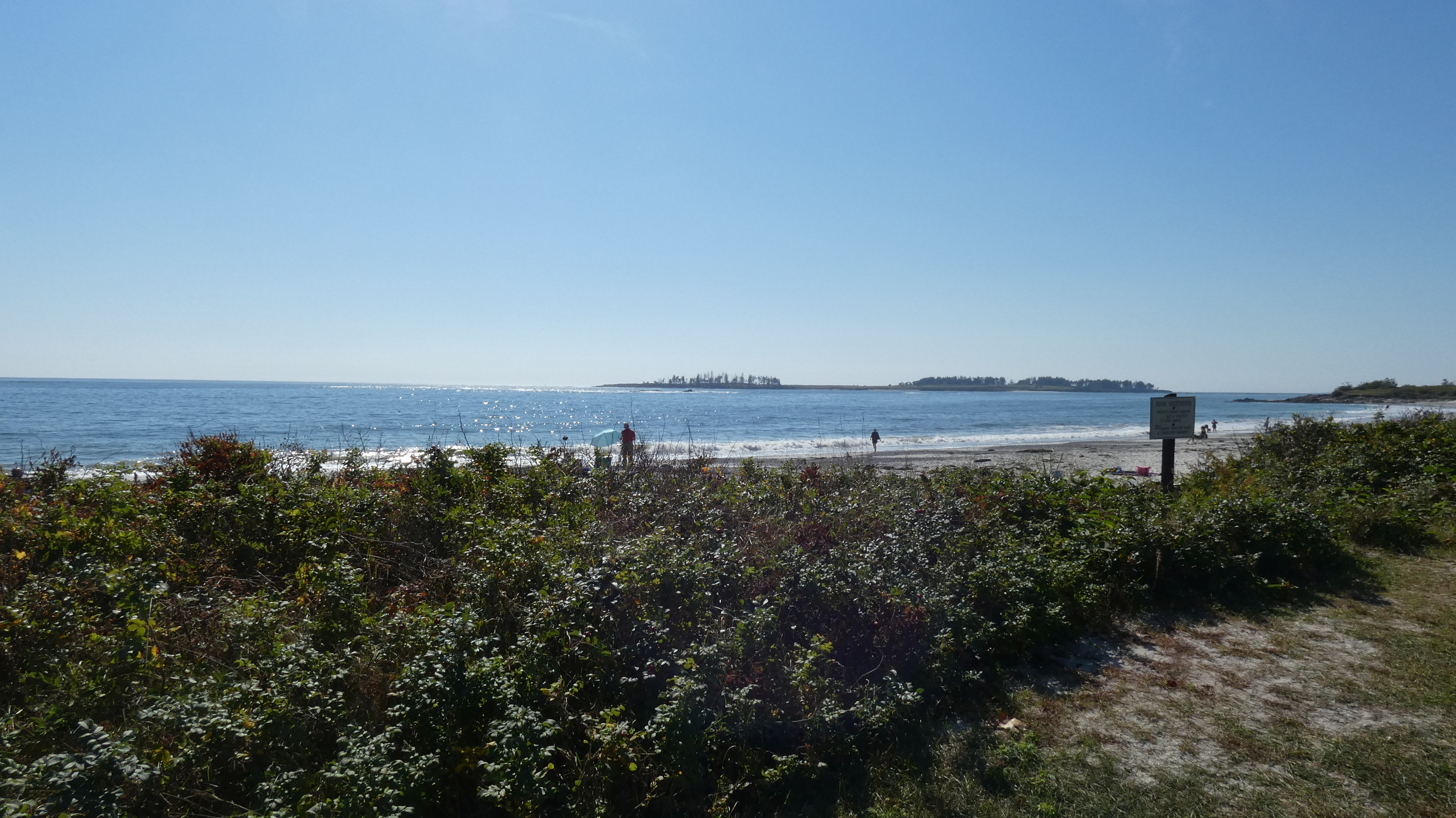

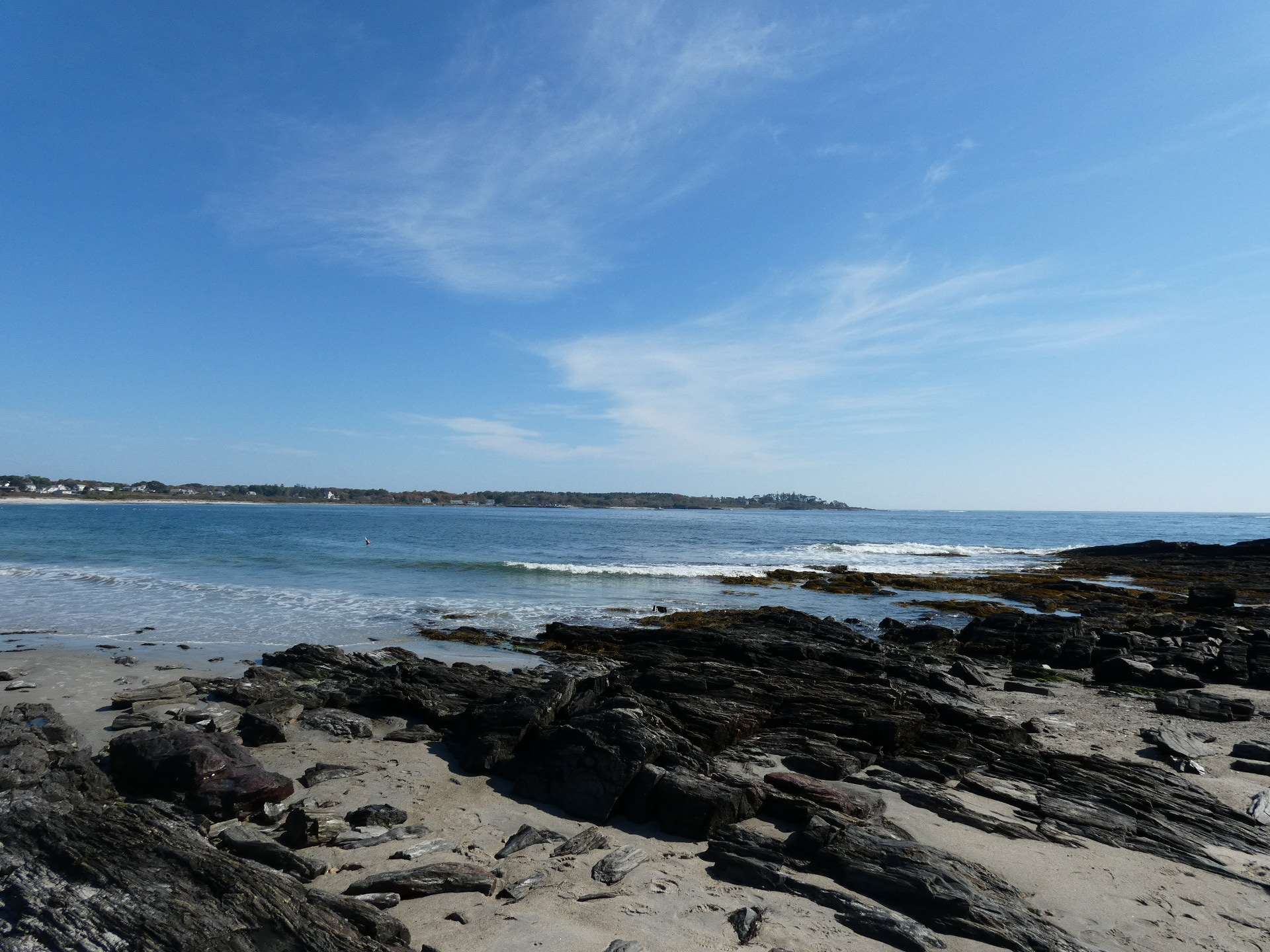

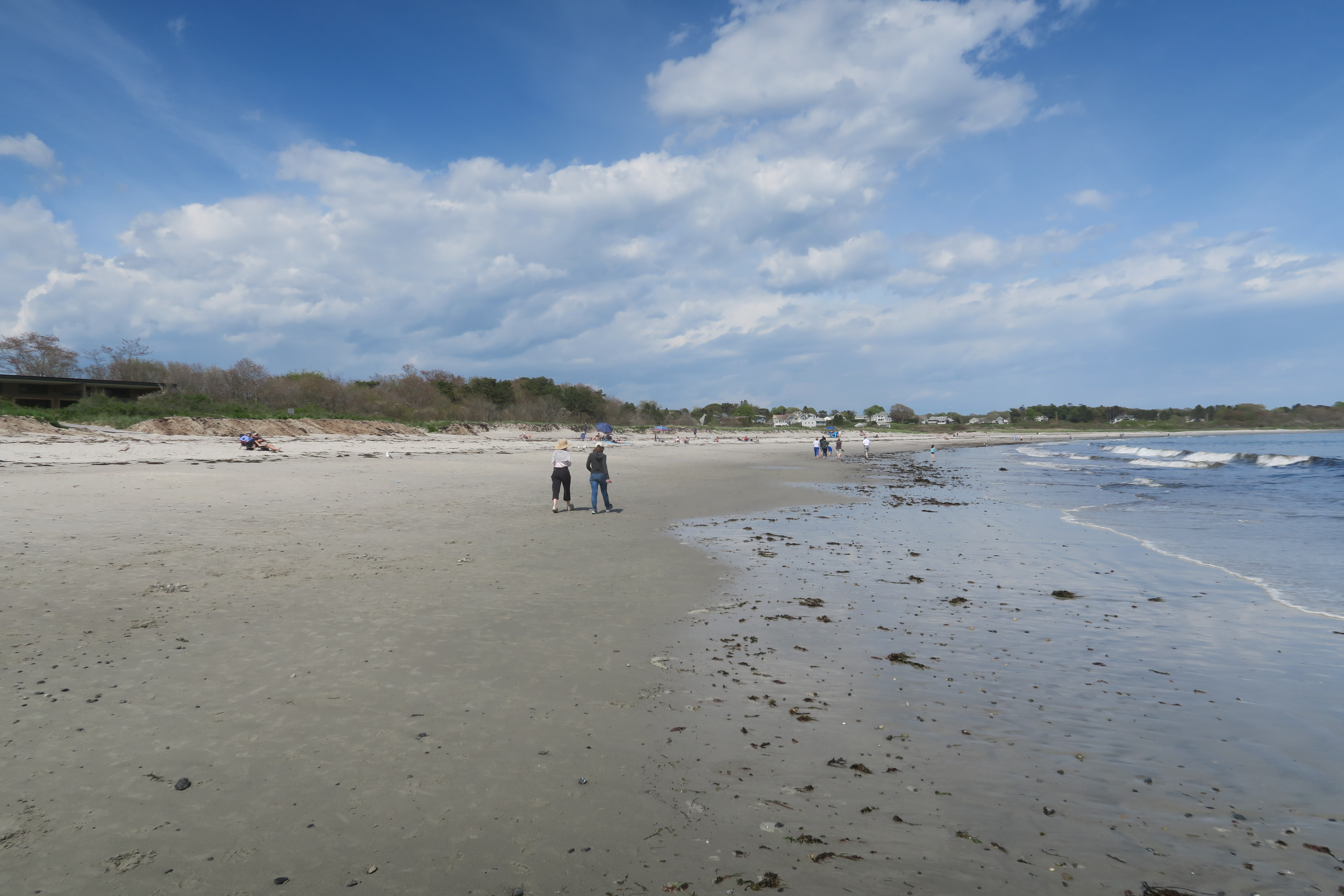

== Hours, restrictions ==
The park is open from 9 a.m. to sunset daily unless otherwise posted at the gate. Dogs are not allowed on the beach April 1 to September 30.
