= Portland Head Light =

Historic lighthouse in the United States

Portland Head Light Portland Head Light
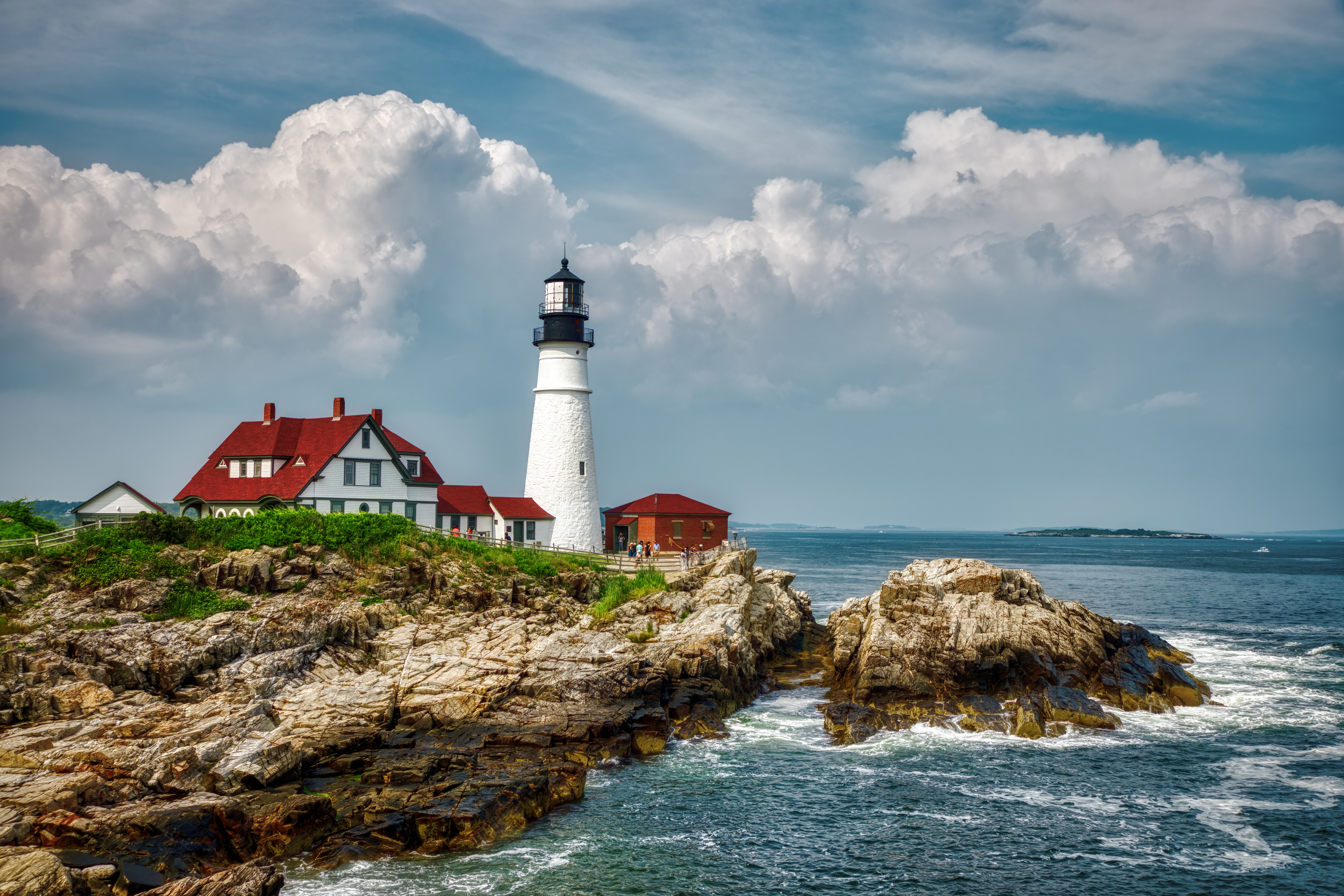
- Location: Portland Head off Shore Rd., Cape Elizabeth, Maine
- Coordinates: 43°37′23″N 70°12′28″W

Tower
- Constructed: 1791
- Foundation: Natural emplaced
- Construction: Rubble stone with brick lining
- Automated: 1989
- Height: 24.38 m (80.0 ft)
- Shape: Conical
- Markings: White with black trim
- Heritage: National Register of Historic Places listed place, Historic Civil Engineering Landmark
- Fog signal: HORN: 1 blast ev 15s

Light
- First lit: 1791
- Focal height: 101 feet (31 m)
- Lens: Fourth order Fresnel lens (original), DCB 224 airport aerobeacon (current)
- Range: 24 nautical miles (44 km; 28 mi)
- Characteristic: Flashing white 4s Lighted continuously
- Portland Head Light
- U.S. National Register of Historic Places
- Area: 10 acres (4.0 ha)
- Architect: Nichols, John; Bryant, Jonathan
- NRHP reference No.: 73000121
- Added to NRHP: April 24, 1973

Portland Head Light is a historic lighthouse in Cape Elizabeth, Maine. The light station sits on a headland at the entrance of the primary shipping channel into Portland Harbor, which is within Casco Bay in the Gulf of Maine. Completed in 1791, it was the first lighthouse built by the U.S. government and is the oldest lighthouse in Maine. The light station is automated, and the tower, beacon, and foghorn are maintained by the United States Coast Guard, while the former lighthouse keeper's house is a maritime museum within Fort Williams Park.

== History ==
In 1785, leaders in historic Falmouth directed their representative to the Massachusetts General Court to secure funding for construction of a lighthouse at Portland Head.

Construction began in 1787 at the directive of George Washington and was completed on January 10, 1791, using a fund of $1,500, established by him. Whale oil lamps were originally used for illumination. In 1855, following the formation of the Lighthouse Board, a fourth-order Fresnel lens was installed; that lens was replaced by a second-order Fresnel lens, which was replaced later by an aerobeacon in 1958. That lens was replaced with a DCB-224 aerobeacon in 1991. The DCB-224 aerobeacon is still in use.

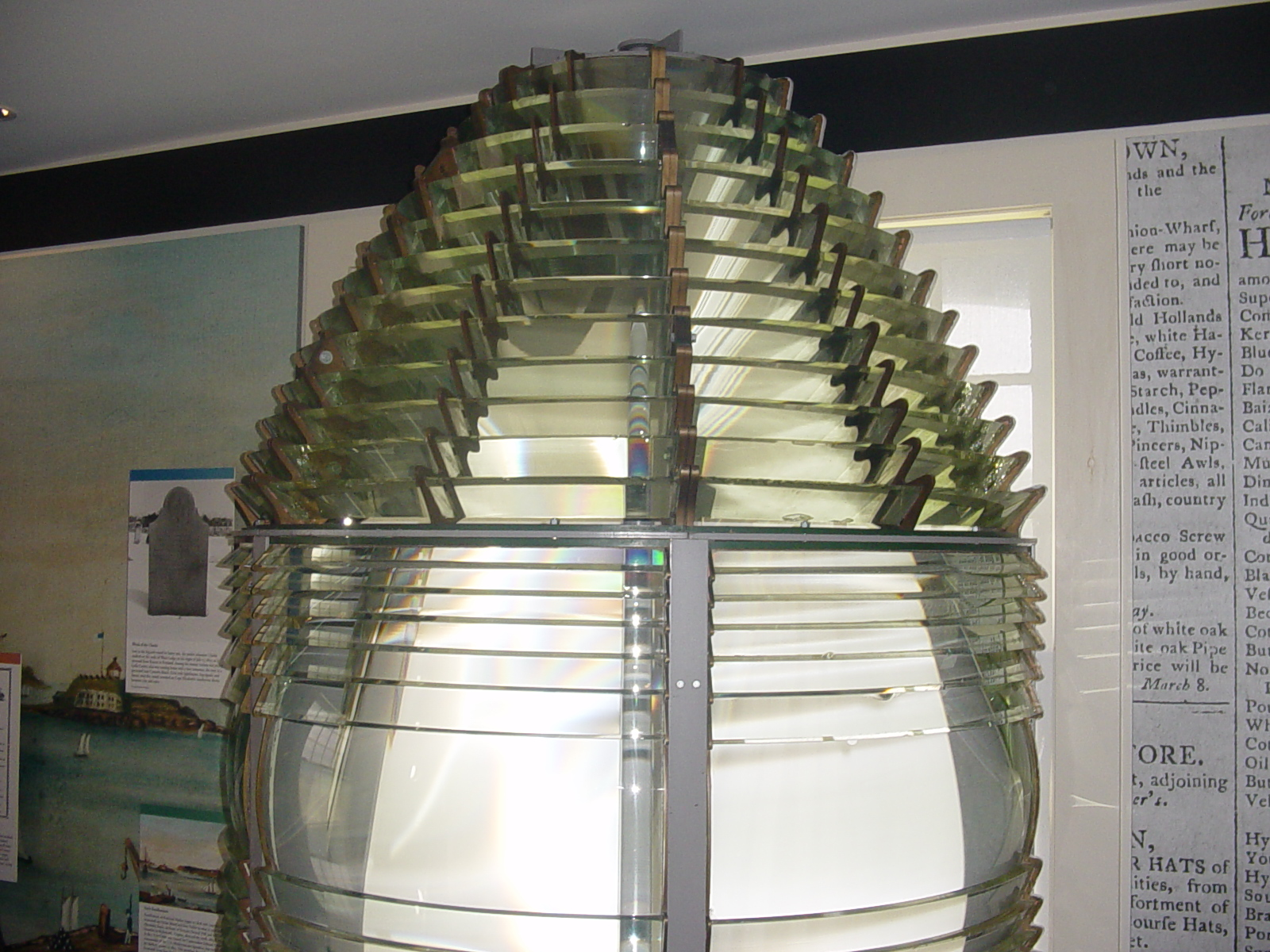
Original Fresnel lens

In 1787, while Maine was still part of the state of Massachusetts, George Washington engaged two masons from the town of Falmouth (modern-day Portland), Jonathan Bryant and John Nichols, and instructed them to take charge of the construction of a lighthouse on Portland Head. Washington reminded them that the early government was poor, and said that the materials used to build the lighthouse should be taken from the fields and shores, materials which could be handled nicely when hauled by oxen on a drag. The original plans called for the tower to be 58 feet tall. When the masons completed this task, they climbed to the top of the tower and realized that it would not be visible beyond the headlands to the south, so it was raised another 20 feet.

The tower was built of rubblestone, and Washington gave the masons four years to build it. While it was under construction in 1789, the federal government was being formed, and for a while, it looked as though the lighthouse would not be finished. Following passage of their ninth law, the first congress made an appropriation and authorized the Secretary of the Treasury, Alexander Hamilton, to inform the mechanics that they could go on with the completion of the tower. On August 10, 1790, the second session of Congress appropriated a sum not to exceed $1500, and under the direction of the President, "to cause the said lighthouse to be finished and completed accordingly." The tower was completed in 1790 and first lit on January 10, 1791.

During the American Civil War, raids on shipping in and out of Portland Harbor became commonplace, and because of the necessity for ships at sea to sight Portland Head Light as soon as possible, the tower was raised 20 more feet. The current keepers' house was built in 1891. When Halfway Rock Light was built, Portland Head Light was considered less important, and in 1883, the tower was shortened 20 feet (6.1 m) and a weaker fourth-order Fresnel lens was added. Following the mariners' complaints, the former height and second-order Fresnel lens were restored in 1885.

In 1886, the barque Annie C. Maguire went aground at Portland Head Light, with the crew and passengers able to get ashore.

The station has changed little except for rebuilding the whistle house in 1975 due to its having been badly damaged in a storm; and switching to automated operations in August 1989. Davis Simpson was the last to hold the role head light keeper with Nathan Wasserstrom assistant light keeper. Wasserstrom's spouse recollected hearing of the opportunity to live at Portland Head Light while renting a small apartment, saying "when I came out here and saw how beautiful it was, I thought to myself that we’d never have another chance to live in a wonderful place like this.”

Today, Portland Head Light stands 80 feet (24 m) above ground and 101 feet (31 m) above water, its white conical tower is connected to a dwelling. The grounds and historic keeper's house are owned by the town of Cape Elizabeth, while the beacon and fog signal is owned and maintained by the U.S. Coast Guard as a current aid to navigation. It was added to the National Register of Historic Places as Portland Head light (sic) on April 24, 1973, reference number 73000121. The lighthouse was designated as a National Historic Civil Engineering Landmark by the American Society of Civil Engineers in 2002.

== In art and popular culture ==
- Edward Hopper painted the lighthouse in 1927. His watercolor resides at Boston's Museum of Fine Arts.
- A snowy Portland Head Light was featured in the 1999 drama Snow Falling on Cedars, which was filmed during the Ice storm of 1998.
- The lighthouse was featured in the fifth, sixth, and seventh seasons of Agents of S.H.I.E.L.D.. Described as being on the shores of Lake Ontario in the show, the building housed an underground facility used by S.H.I.E.L.D. as their covert base of operations.
- The lighthouse and its nearby shores are featured in the Disney attraction Soarin' Around America, found at Epcot in Walt Disney World.

It was also featured on a postcard in the opening credits of National Lampoon's Vacation.

== See also ==
- Annie C. Maguire shipwreck
- Port of Portland
- National Register of Historic Places listings in Cumberland County, Maine
