= Cape Elizabeth, Maine =

Town in Maine, United States

- Town
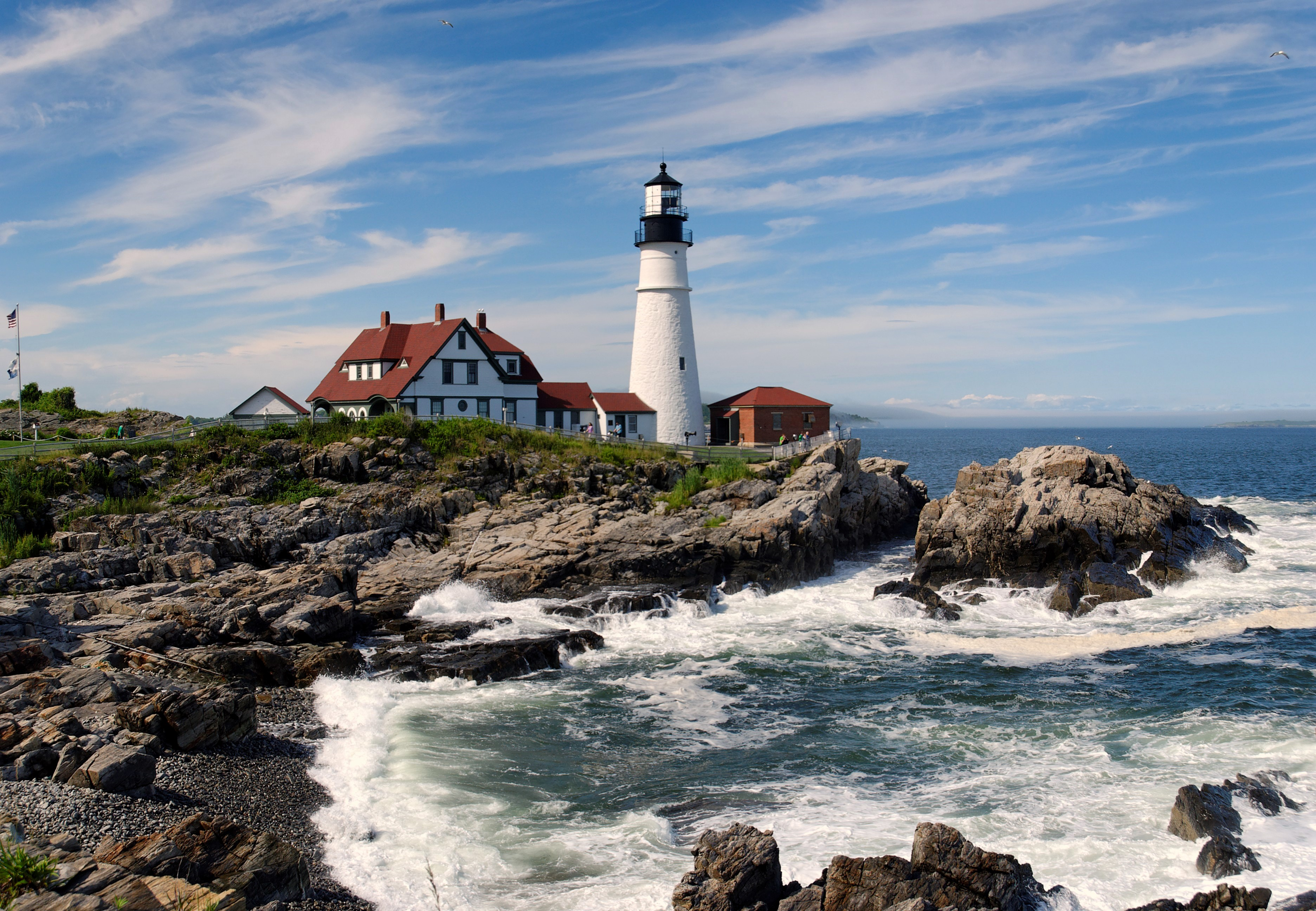
- The Portland Head Light, located in Cape Elizabeth

- Seal
- Nicknames: "Cape", "the Cape", "Cape Liz", "Cape Bess", "CE", "Capeside"
- Location in Cumberland County and the state of Maine
- Coordinates: 43°35′40″N 70°14′02″W
- Country: United States
- State: Maine
- County: Cumberland
- Incorporated/Chartered: November 1, 1765
- Neighborhoods, Villages, and Communities: Cape Elizabeth; Cape Cottage; Delano Park; Elizabeth Park; Mountainview Park; Pond Cove; Two Lights; Kettle Cove; Spurwink Shores; Oakhurst; Shore Acres; Bowery Beach; Casino Beach; Oceanhouse Heights; Fowler; Broad Cove; Great Pond

Area
  - Total: 45.93 sq mi (118.96 km^{2})
  - Land: 14.70 sq mi (38.07 km^{2})
  - Water: 31.23 sq mi (80.89 km^{2})
- Elevation: 23 ft (7.0 m)

Population (2020)
  - Total: 9,535
  - Density: 649/sq mi (250.5/km^{2})
- Time zone: UTC−5 (Eastern (EST))
  - Summer (DST): UTC−4 (EDT)
- ZIP Code: 04107
- Area code: 207
- FIPS code: 23-10180
- GNIS feature ID: 582387
- Website: www.capeelizabeth.gov

Cape Elizabeth is a town in Cumberland County, Maine, United States. The town is part of the Portland–South Portland–Biddeford metropolitan area. As of the 2020 census, Cape Elizabeth had a population of 9,535.

One of the wealthiest towns in the state, Cape Elizabeth is the location of Portland Head Light, which is the oldest lighthouse in Maine. Since 1998, it has hosted the Beach to Beacon 10K, a world-class road race which starts at Crescent Beach State Park and ends at Portland Head Light.

Cape Elizabeth has a single community school department. Cape Elizabeth High School's team name is the "Capers".

== History ==
=== Early exploration and settlement (1525–1650) ===
Spanish explorers mapped the area in 1525, naming it "Cabo de Arrecife." English explorer Bartholomew Gosnold arrived on May 14, 1602, during his New England explorations. The English name derives from King Charles I of England, who renamed it in honor of his sister, Elizabeth of Bohemia, when John Smith presented his 1615 map for royal approval—one of only four such royal renamings that survive today.

The first European settlement was established on Richmond Island in 1628 by Walter Bagnall, who operated a trading post dealing in rum and beaver pelts. His dishonest practices with the Wabanaki led to his death in October 1631 when Native Americans killed him and burned his post. Two months later, the Plymouth Company granted the island to Robert Trelawney and Moses Goodyear, who developed it into a fishing and trading center employing 60 men by 1638.

George Cleeve and Richard Tucker established the first mainland settlement in 1630 near the Spurwink River. After being displaced by John Winter in 1632, they received a 1,500-acre grant from Sir Ferdinando Gorges in 1636, including the peninsula called Machegonne (now Portland). The area came under Alexander Rigby's control in 1643 when he purchased the Plough of Lygonia patent.

=== Colonial conflicts (1675–1720) ===
The settlement at Purpoodock on the Fore River was attacked during King Philip's War in 1675. During King William's War, Major Benjamin Church arrived at Casco Bay with 300 men on September 11, 1690. After attacking a Native American village upriver, Church's forces were retaliated against at Purpooduc Point, where seven of his men were killed and 24 wounded. The town was completely destroyed in 1703 during Queen Anne's War and remained largely abandoned until resettlement began around 1719-1720.

=== Municipal development (1765–1895) ===
Cape Elizabeth separated from Falmouth (now Portland) on November 1, 1765, becoming Maine's 23rd incorporated town. The first town meeting was held on December 2, 1765. The original boundaries included all area south of Portland Harbor and east of the Spurwink River.

In 1895, South Portland separated from Cape Elizabeth due to contrasting development patterns—commercial and industrial growth in the north versus the continuing rural character in the south. During this period, the community attracted notable architecture, including several houses designed by John Calvin Stevens.

=== Fort Williams era (1872–1962) ===
The United States Army began constructing a coast artillery fort around Portland Head Light in 1872 to guard Portland Harbor's southern entrance. Named Fort Williams in 1899 for Civil War Major General Seth Williams, the installation served actively until 1962. The town purchased the property for approximately $200,000, creating Fort Williams Park, which includes the lighthouse and museum, fort ruins, the Goddard Mansion ruins, and recreational facilities.

The Cape Cottage Casino & Theater opened in 1899, one of multiple resorts in South Portland and Cape Elizabeth along a new electric trolley line.

=== Modern era ===
Cape Elizabeth has developed into one of Maine's wealthiest communities while preserving its historic character. Since 1998, the town has hosted the Beach to Beacon 10K road race from Crescent Beach State Park to Portland Head Light. The Cape Elizabeth Land Trust protects 560 acres across 22 parcels, maintaining extensive trail systems that reflect the community's commitment to balancing development with conservation.

== Geography ==
According to the United States Census Bureau, the town has a total area of 45.93 square miles (118.96 km^{2}), of which 14.70 square miles (38.07 km^{2}) is land and 31.23 square miles (80.89 km^{2}) is water. The nearest city is South Portland. Cape Elizabeth shares a border with South Portland to the north and Scarborough to the west.

The town includes two islands. Ram Island is a small and unoccupied island southwest of Richmond Island. This should not be confused with Ram Island Ledge which contains Ram Island Ledge Light and is within Portland, Maine. The 226-acre (91 ha) Richmond Island, originally inhabited by Native Americans, then English settlers, is now uninhabited except by a small herd of sheep.

Cape Elizabeth is the home of three coastal parks: Fort Williams Park, Two Lights State Park, and Crescent Beach State Park. Additionally, the Cape Elizabeth Land Trust, a private nonprofit corporation, protects 560 acres (230 ha) of land on 22 different parcels for public use, maintaining a large system of connecting non-motorized trails on most.

The town itself has 923 acres of land owned or under easement protection for conservation purposes.

== Demographics ==
Historical population
Census	Pop.	Note	%±
1790	1,356		—
1800	1,275		−6.0%
1810	1,415		11.0%
1820	1,688		19.3%
1830	1,696		0.5%
1840	1,666		−1.8%
1850	2,082		25.0%
1860	3,278		57.4%
1870	5,106		55.8%
1880	5,302		3.8%
1890	5,459		3.0%
1900	887		−83.8%
1910	1,857		109.4%
1920	1,534		−17.4%
1930	2,376		54.9%
1940	3,172		33.5%
1950	3,816		20.3%
1960	5,505		44.3%
1970	7,873		43.0%
1980	7,838		−0.4%
1990	8,854		13.0%
2000	9,068		2.4%
2010	9,015		−0.6%
2020	9,535		5.8%
U.S. Decennial Census

=== 2010 census ===
As of the census of 2010, there were 9,015 people, 3,616 households, and 2,620 families living in the town. The population density was 613.3 inhabitants per square mile (236.8/km^{2}). There were 3,963 housing units at an average density of 269.6 per square mile (104.1/km^{2}). The racial makeup of the town was 96.6% White, 0.5% African American, 0.2% Native American, 1.4% Asian, 0.1% Pacific Islander, 0.3% from other races, and 1.0% from two or more races. Hispanic or Latino of any race were 1.4% of the population.

There were 3,616 households, of which 33.5% had children under the age of 18 living with them, 62.5% were married couples living together, 7.3% had a female householder with no husband present, 2.7% had a male householder with no wife present, and 27.5% were non-families. 22.9% of all households were made up of individuals, and 10.7% had someone living alone who was 65 years of age or older. The average household size was 2.49 and the average family size was 2.95.

The median age in the town was 46.8 years. 25% of residents were under the age of 18; 4.5% were between the ages of 18 and 24; 17.3% were from 25 to 44; 37.3% were from 45 to 64; and 16.1% were 65 years of age or older. The gender makeup of the town was 48.2% male and 51.8% female.

=== 2000 census ===
As of the census of 2000, there were 9,068 people, 3,488 households, and 2,605 families living in the town. The population density was 615.5 inhabitants per square mile (237.6/km^{2}). There were 3,724 housing units at an average density of 252.8 per square mile (97.6/km^{2}). The racial makeup of the town was 98% White, 0.3% African American, 0.06% Native American, 0.99% Asian, 0.06% Pacific Islander, 0.12% from other races, and 0.49% from two or more races. Hispanic or Latino of any race were 0.50% of the population.

There were 3,488 households, out of which 36.0% had children under the age of 18 living with them, 65.7% were married couples living together, 6.5% had a female householder with no husband present, and 25.3% were non-families. 21.1% of all households were made up of individuals, and 9.9% had someone living alone who was 65 years of age or older. The average household size was 2.57 and the average family size was 3.01.

In the town, the population was spread out, with 26.5% under the age of 18, 3.7% from 18 to 24, 23.5% from 25 to 44, 30.3% from 45 to 64, and 16.0% who were 65 years of age or older. The median age was 43 years. For every 100 females, there were 91.4 males. For every 100 females age 18 and over, there were 85.4 males.

The median income for a household in the town was $144,250 (2022). In 2000, Males had a median income of $61,128 versus $32,500 for females. The per capita income for the town was $47,983. About 1.3% of families and 3.1% of the population were below the poverty line, including 1.5% of those under age 18 and 8.1% of those age 65 or over.

== Schools ==
The Cape Elizabeth School Department consists of Elementary School, Cape Elizabeth Middle School, and Cape Elizabeth High School, all situated in one campus in the town center. The Cape Elizabeth School Department offices are across the street in the Cape Elizabeth Town Hall.

== Government and politics ==
Cape Elizabeth has a town council-town manager form of government. The seven-member town council is elected at large on a nonpartisan basis to staggered three-year terms. The school board is also a seven-member body elected at large on a nonpartisan basis to staggered three-year terms.

The town council chair is Penelope A. Jordan. The Town Manager is Patrick Fox.

=== Election results ===
Cape Elizabeth voted for all Republican presidential candidates from 1968–1988 by double digit margins, then voted Republican narrowly in the three way election of 1992, and has voted for each of the seven Democratic presidential candidates since 1996; five of them by double digits.

Cape Elizabeth town vote by party in presidential elections
Year	Democratic	Republican	Third Parties
2020	77.09% 5,349	21.07% 1,462	1.84% 128
2016	70.23% 4,480	24.97% 1,593	4.80% 306
2012	63.08% 4,018	35.49% 2,261	1.43% 91
2008	65.69% 4,164	33.41% 2,118	0.90% 57
2004	58.39% 3,679	40.44% 2,548	1.17% 74
2000	49.25% 2,962	45.04% 2,709	5.70% 343
1996	48.17% 2,734	42.12% 2,391	9.70% 551
1992	40.24% 1,574	41.09% 2,186	18.68% 1,163
1988	39.00% 2,099	59.96% 3,227	1.04% 56
1984	35.81% 1,901	64.11% 3,403	0.08% 4
1980	31.24% 1,545	54.79% 2,710	13.97% 691
1976	31.51% 1,639	66.28% 3,448	2.21% 115
1972	28.99% 1,238	71.01% 3,033	0.00% 0
1968	39.83% 1,540	59.39% 2,296	0.78% 30

== Media ==
Cape Elizabeth is served by a community newspaper, the Cape Courier. The nonprofit, biweekly paper is largely supported by volunteers, and was started by Ellen Van Fleet and Jan Soland in 1988.

In 1881, the Cape Elizabeth Sentinel was published in Ferry Village, now a part of South Portland. This weekly lasted nearly 30 years.

== Sites of interest ==
- Cape Elizabeth Lights
- Crescent Beach State Park
- Fort Williams Park
- Portland Head Light
- Ram Island Ledge Light
- Spurwink Congregational Church
- Spurwink River
- Two Lights State Park

== Notable people ==
- Joan Benoit, gold medalist in 1984 Olympic Marathon, founder of the Beach to Beacon 10K
- Ben Brewster, soccer player and coach
- Carey Burtt, film maker and musician
- George Cleeve, early settler
- Eliot Cutler, lawyer, entrepreneur, politician and candidate for Governor in 2010
- Bette Davis, actress
- Cynthia Dill, lawyer and 2012 Democratic candidate for United States Senate
- Clara L. Brown Dyer (1849–1931), artist
- Clare Egan, Winter biathlete
- Eleanor Espling, politician
- John Ford, film director
- Doug Friedman, professional ice hockey player
- Richard D. Hewes, Speaker of the House of the Maine Legislature, state senator
- William J. Kayatta, Jr., federal Court of Appeals judge
- Thomas D. Kinley, US Army major general, resided in Cape Elizabeth
- Henry Kramer, classical pianist
- Samuel Longfellow, clergyman and hymn writer
- Jean Ginn Marvin, state legislator
- Nancy Masterton, state representative
- George H. Minott, state representative
- Kim Moody, distance runner
- Dodge Morgan, sailor, businessman, and publisher
- Michael Murphy, actor of film, television, and the stage
- Robert Peary, explorer, raised in Cape Elizabeth
- Matt Rand, distance runner
- Role Model, recording artist
- Joy Williams, fiction writer and essayist
