= Port of Portland (Maine) =

Seaport district in Portland, Maine, USA

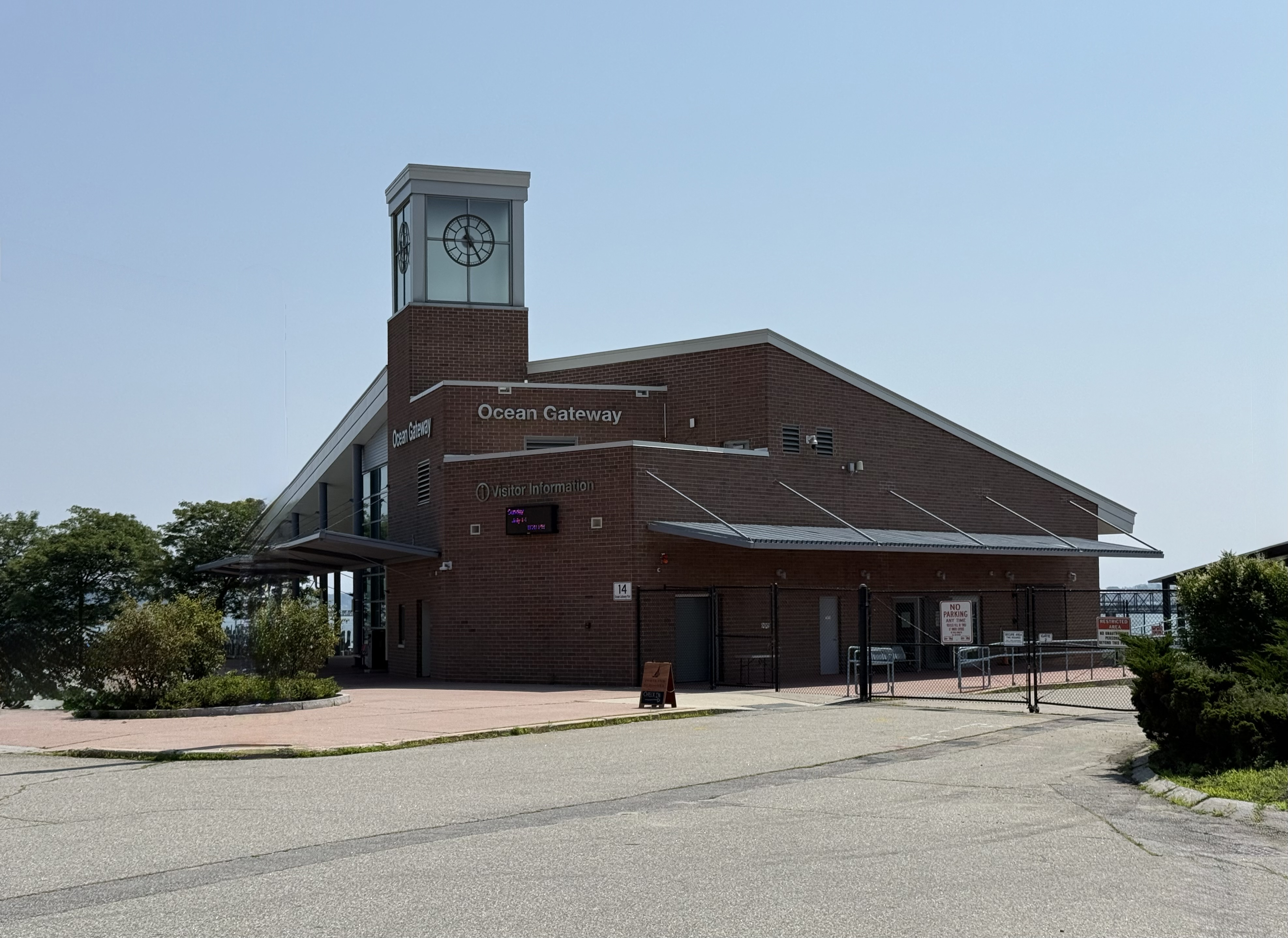
- Ocean Gateway International Marine Passenger Terminal, the largest passenger ship terminal in the Port of Portland
- Interactive map of Port of Portland
- Location within the United States

Location
- Country: United States
- Location: Portland, Cumberland County, ME
- Coordinates: 43.65°N 70.251°W
- UN/LOCODE: USPWM

Details
- No. of berths: 15
- No. of piers: 11
- Draft depth: Depth 48 feet (15 m)
- Harbor Master: Paul Plummer

Statistics
- Annual container volume: 22,325 container units (2019)
- Website www.portlandharbor.org

The Port of Portland is a seaport located in Portland, Maine. It is the second-largest tonnage seaport in New England as well as one of the largest oil ports on the East Coast (the second-largest prior to 2016). It is the primary American port of call for Icelandic shipping company Eimskip.

There are nine terminals in the port according to the Maine Port Authority, a statewide agency that oversees Maine's commercial marine facilities. Additionally there are two passenger facilities, the Ocean Gateway International Marine Passenger Terminal and the Casco Bay Ferry Terminal.

The majority of Portland's non-passenger terminals are for petroleum products, especially the Portland–Montreal pipeline, which has gradually reduced its capacity since 2010. Container shipping through Portland has increased considerably over that same period.

100 cruise ships docked in Portland in 2019, making it Maine's second-largest cruise ship port behind Bar Harbor. A regional ferry service, Casco Bay Lines, also operates out of the Port of Portland.

== History ==
Maritime trade has always been important in Portland, as the name reflects. By 1806, Portland was the sixth-largest American port, and Fort Preble was constructed to defend it, forming the heart of the Harbor Defenses of Portland. During the American Civil War, the Confederate States Navy unsuccessfully targeted the Port of Portland; this was the only major action ever seen by Fort Preble, which was partially disarmed during World War I. During World War II, Battery Steele was constructed in Portland on Peaks Island, making Fort Preble obsolete. Battery Steele itself was abandoned after the war ended.

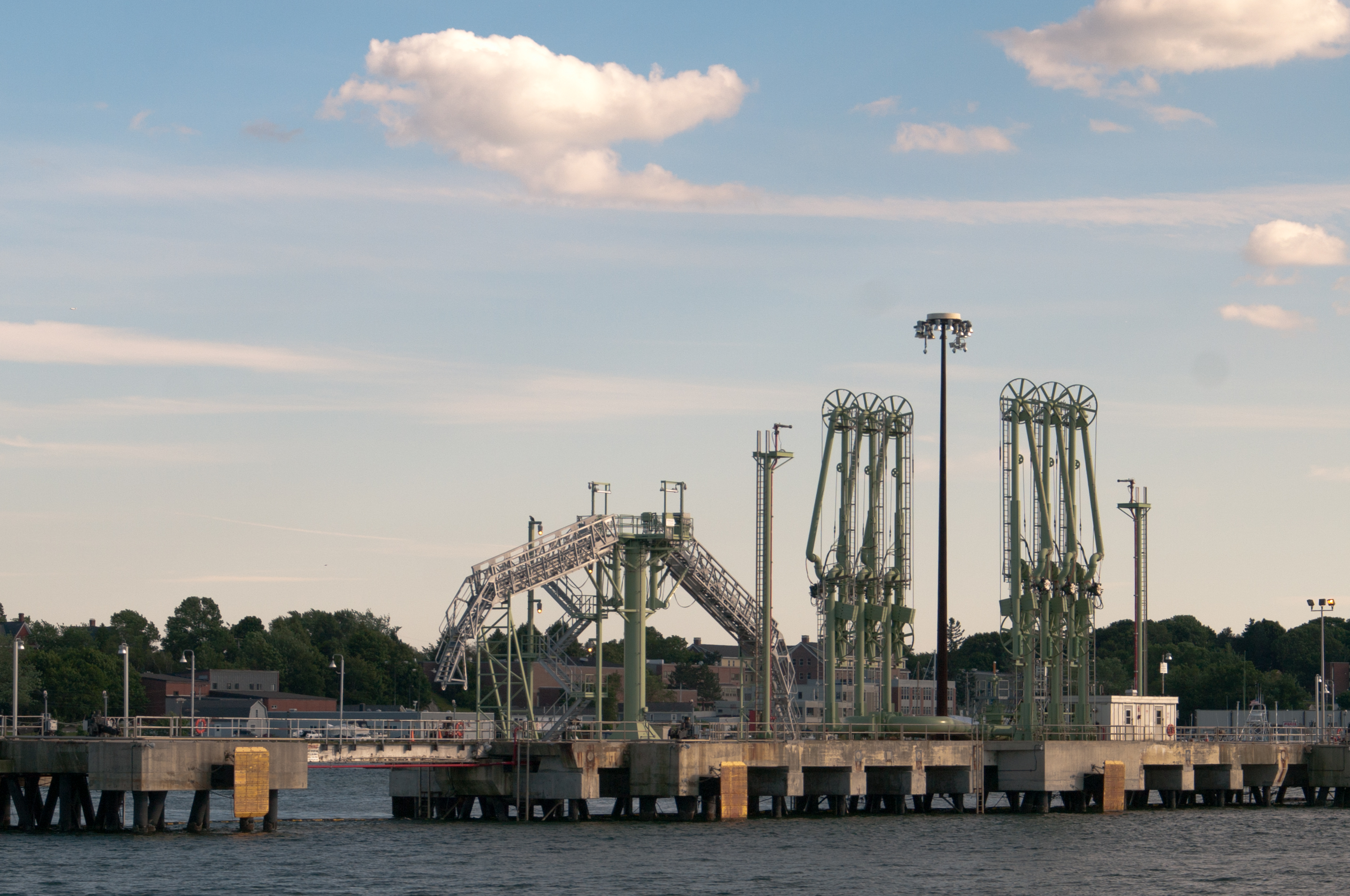
Port of Portland in July 2012

From 1970 to 2008, the Port of Portland was connected by a seasonal (summer only) international ferry service to Yarmouth, Nova Scotia. Lion Ferry operated the first vessels on this route, MS Prince of Fundy (1970–76), MS Bolero (1973–76), and MS Caribe (1976–81). CN Marine operated the MV Marine Evangeline from 1978 to 1982. Prince of Fundy Cruises and later Scotia Prince Cruises operated the MS Scotia Prince from 1983 to 2004.

Bay Ferries began operating the high speed catamaran HSC The Cat on the Portland-Nova Scotia route in 2006 using the newly constructed Ocean Gateway International Marine Passenger Terminal for the 2008 and 2009 seasons. This service was canceled after the 2009 season.

Icelandic shipping company Eimskip began container service between Europe and Portland in 2013. Between 2013 and 2019, container traffic in the Port of Portland nearly tripled. The construction of a cold storage facility has been proposed several times, most recently in 2020, as a way to make the port more valuable for foreign trade.

On March 26, 2026, the National Security Multi-Mission Vessel State of Maine (ship) arrived in port for its first home-state port call before being turned over to the Maine Maritime Academy the following week.

== See also ==
- United States container ports
