= List of people from Portland, Maine =

The following list includes notable people who were born or have lived in Portland, Maine.

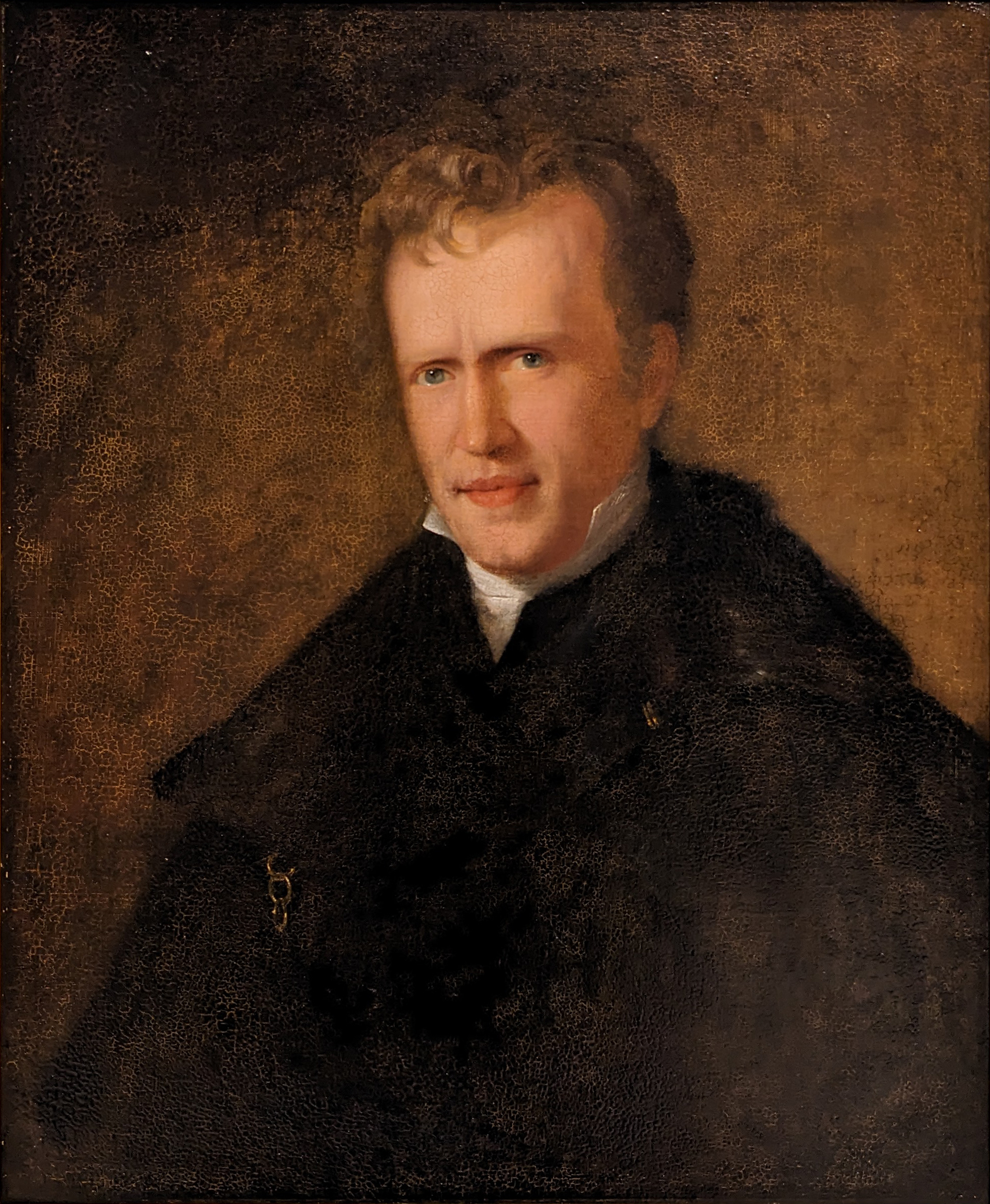
Eccentric and influential writer and critic, John Neal

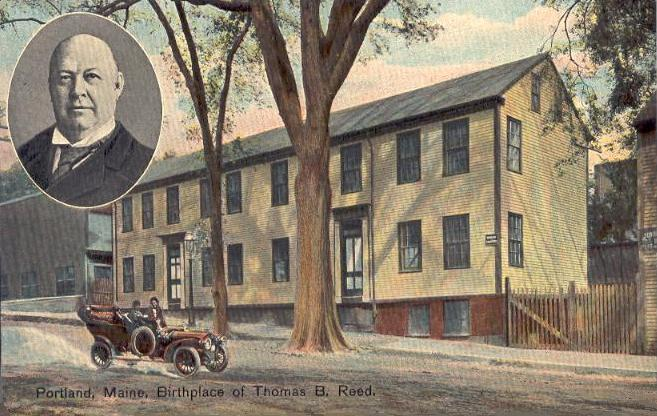
Birthplace of Thomas B. Reed c. 1915 (since demolished)

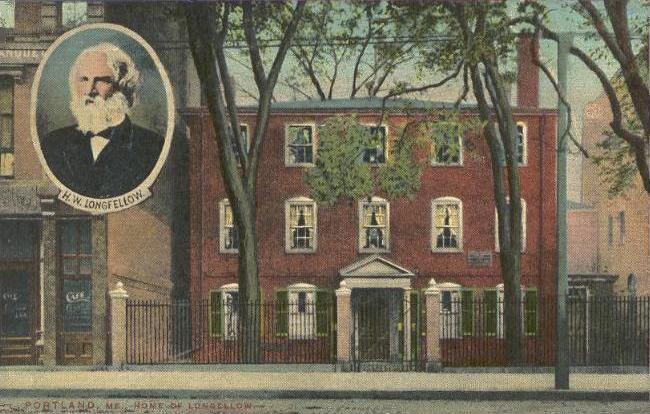
Wadsworth-Longfellow House c. 1910

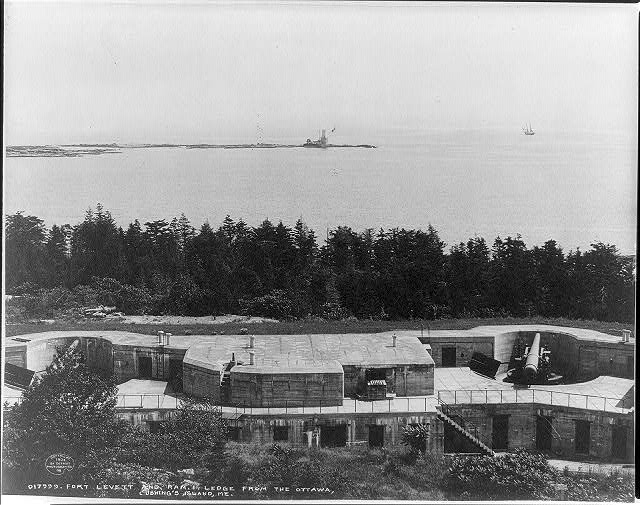
Fort Levett

== Authors and academics ==
- John Howard Appleton, chemist
- Louisa Dow Benton, linguist and letter writer
- Hannah Johnson Carter, art educator
- Elisabeth Cavazza (1849–1926), author, journalist, and music critic
- Brock Clarke, author
- Jennie Maria Drinkwater Conklin (1841–1900), author
- Leo Connellan, Beat poet and Poet Laureate of Connecticut
- Owen Davis, dramatist
- Robert F. Griffin, essayist
- Dorothy M. Healy, professor at Westbrook College, curator of the Maine Women Writers Collection
- Stephen King, author
- Henry Wadsworth Longfellow, poet
- John Neal, author and critic
- Alan Taylor, historian
- William Irwin Thompson, poet and cultural historian

== Business ==
- James Phinney Baxter, canning magnate and mayor
- Asa Clapp, international merchant
- Cyrus Curtis, publisher and philanthropist
- Lemuel Moody, builder of the Portland Observatory
- John A. Poor, railroad developer
- Roxanne Quimby, founder of Burt's Bees
- Reuben Ruby, businessman and political activist
- Thomas A. Sanders, real estate developer and politician
- George Tate, mast agent
- Donald Valle, founder and owner of the Valle's Steak House restaurant chain
- Thomas Westbrook, mill owner

== Explorers and settlers ==
- George Cleeve, settler
- George Baker Leavitt Sr., whaling captain, arctic explorer
- Capt. Christopher Levett, English explorer of Casco Bay, founded first settlement
- George Munjoy, settler
- Francis Pettygrove, one of Portland Oregon's founders

== Media and arts ==
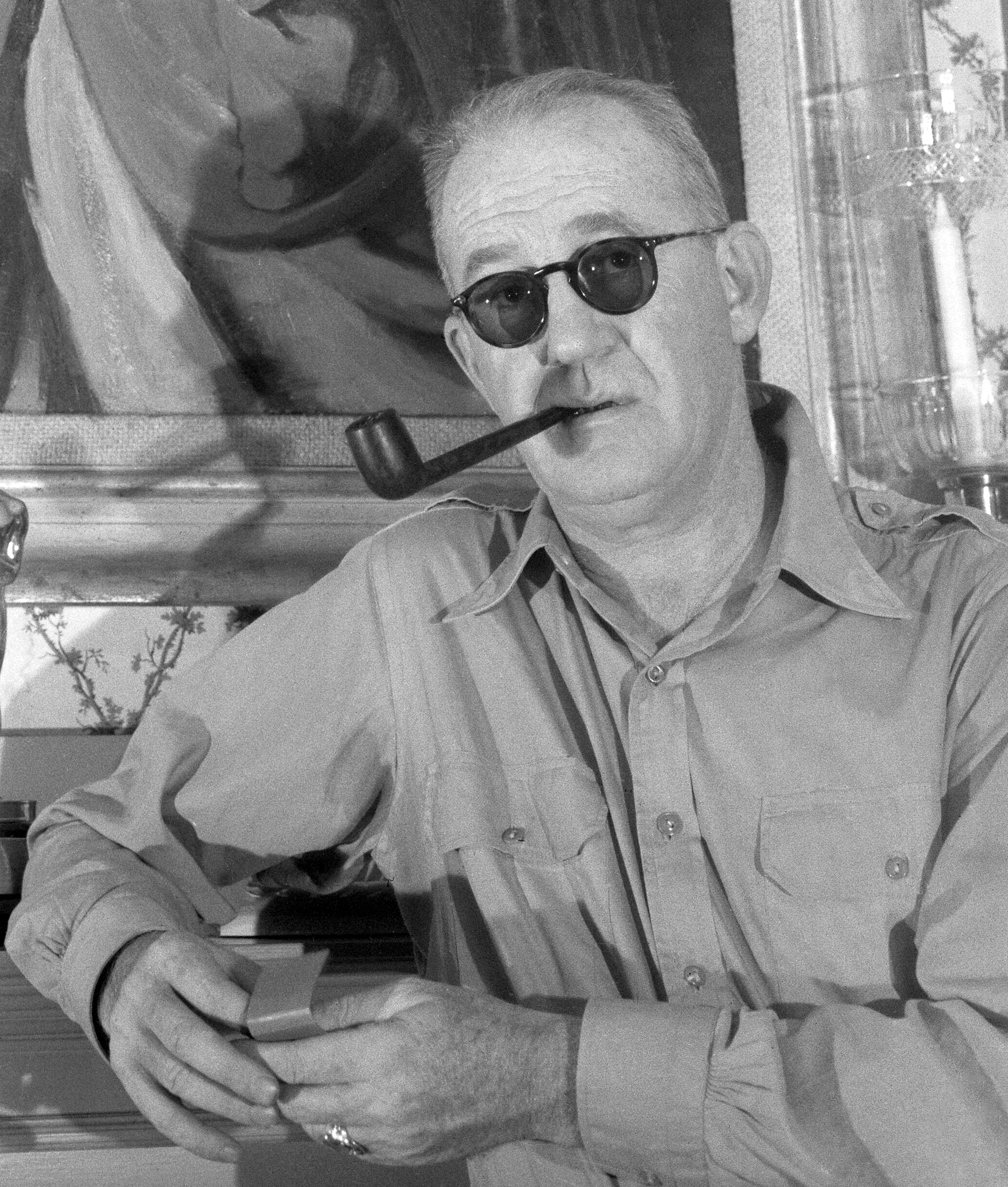
Academy Award winning director John Ford

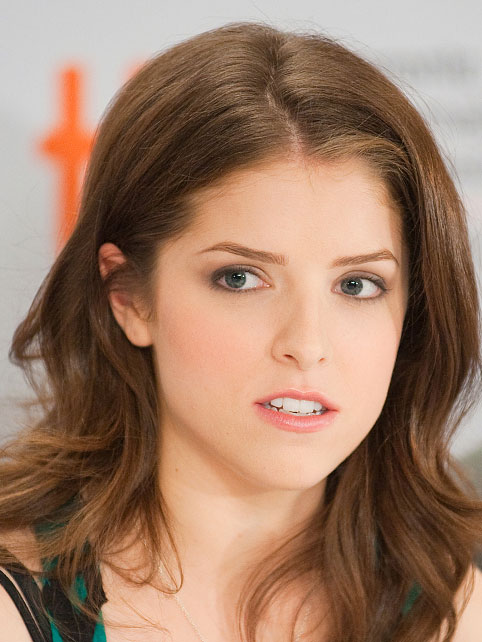
Actress and singer Anna Kendrick

- Maria a'Becket, painter
- Hiram Abrams, motion picture mogul
- Dorothy Appleby, film actress
- William H. Brown Jr., television director and producer; born, raised, and died in Portland
- Bebe Buell, model, musician, and mother of Liv Tyler
- Howie Carr, radio personality
- Cody Christian, actor and rapper
- John Greenleaf Cloudman, artist, portrait painter and cabinet maker
- Charles Codman, painter
- Jerry Crasnick, sports journalist
- Kevin Eastman, co-creator of Teenage Mutant Ninja Turtles
- Greg Finley II, actor
- Frank Fixaris, sportscaster
- Francis Ford, actor
- John Ford, director
- Charles L. Fox, painter, labor unionist, and two-time candidate for governor of Maine with the Socialist Party
- Adam Gardner, musician
- Peter Garland, composer
- Jeremiah Hacker, journalist and reformer
- Will Holt, songwriter
- Avery Yale Kamila, journalist and community organizer
- Anna Kendrick, actress
- Charles F. Kimball, artist
- Jennie Kimball, actor, soubrette, theatrical manager
- Linda Lavin, actress
- Tawny Little, television newscaster and Miss America (1976)
- Mary King Longfellow, painter and niece of Henry Wadsworth Longfellow
- Bob Ludwig, Grammy Award-winning audio mastering engineer
- Bob Marley, comedian
- Andrea Martin, actress
- Judd Nelson, actor
- Lincoln Peirce, comic strip creator, Big Nate
- Victoria Rowell, actress
- Ethelynde Smith, concert singer and botanical painter
- Stuart Saunders Smith, composer and percussionist
- Brett Somers, actress
- Spose, rapper
- Franklin Stanwood, painter
- Phyllis Thaxter, actress
- Liv Tyler, actress
- Louise Brown Verrill, composer

== Military ==
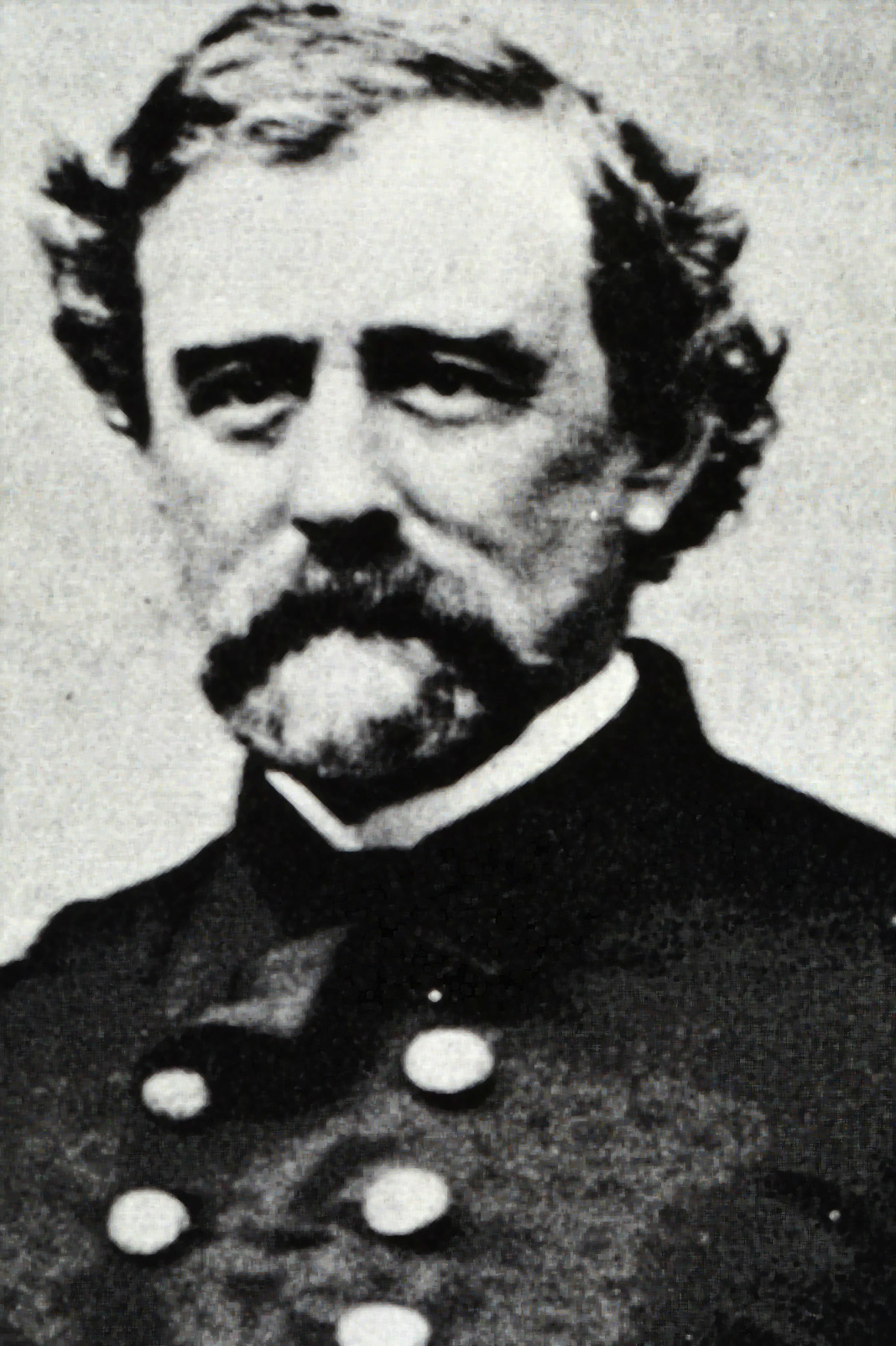
Mexican-American and Civil War naval officer James Alden Jr.

- James Alden Jr., rear admiral in the United States Navy
- George G. Gatley, brigadier general who commanded brigades and divisions in World War I
- Charles Badger Hall, U.S. Army major general
- John H. Hall, inventor of the first United States Army breech-loading rifle
- Horatio Collins King, Medal of Honor recipient
- Charles J. Loring Jr., Medal of Honor recipient
- Holman S. Melcher, mayor, Civil War veteran
- Edward Preble, naval officer
- Jedidiah Preble, militia officer
- Herbert E. Schonland, Medal of Honor recipient
- Ronald Speirs, Army officer with the Easy Company, 506 Parachute Infantry Regiment
- Peleg Wadsworth, Revolutionary War general

== Politics ==
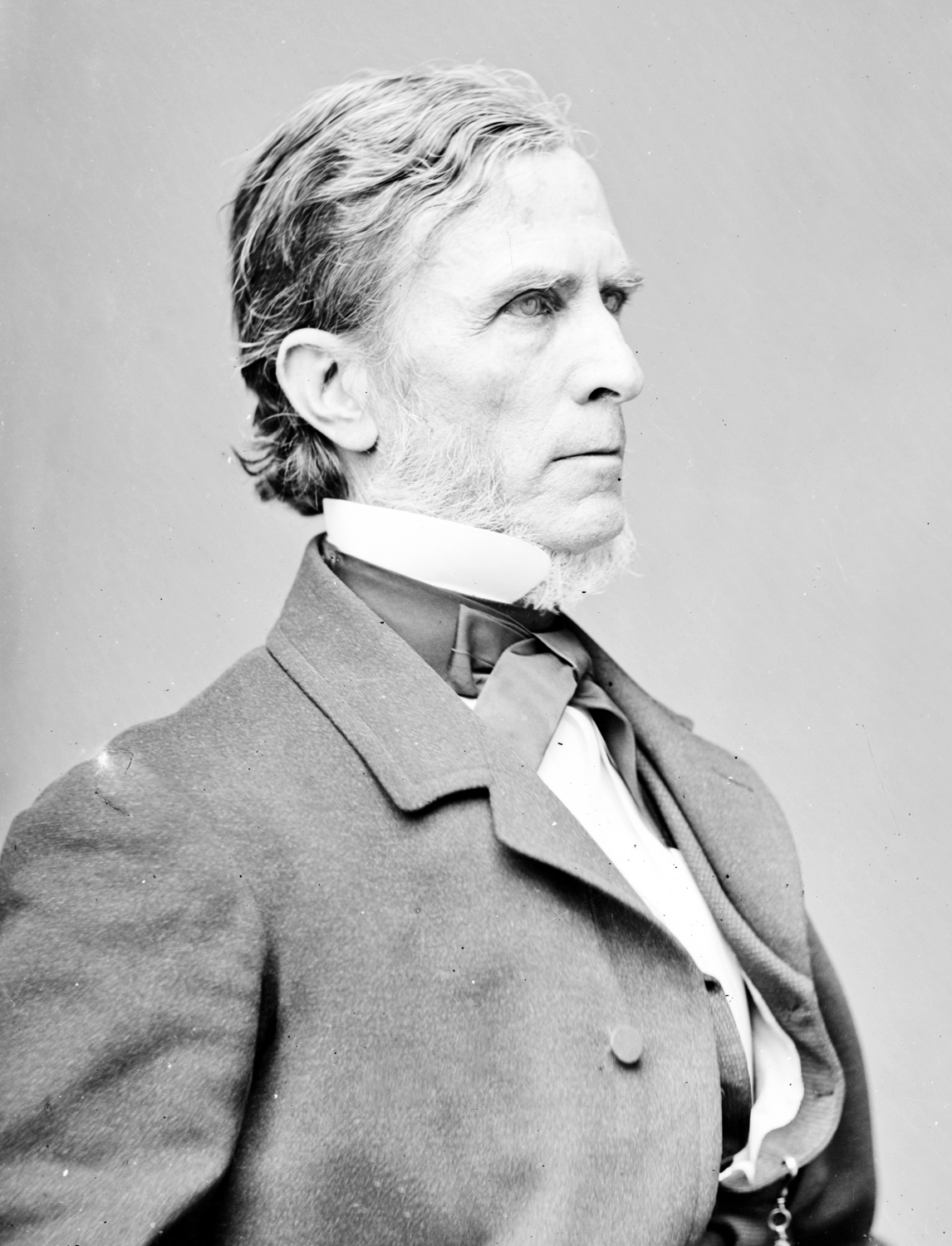
William P. Fessenden, Secretary of the Treasury for Abraham Lincoln

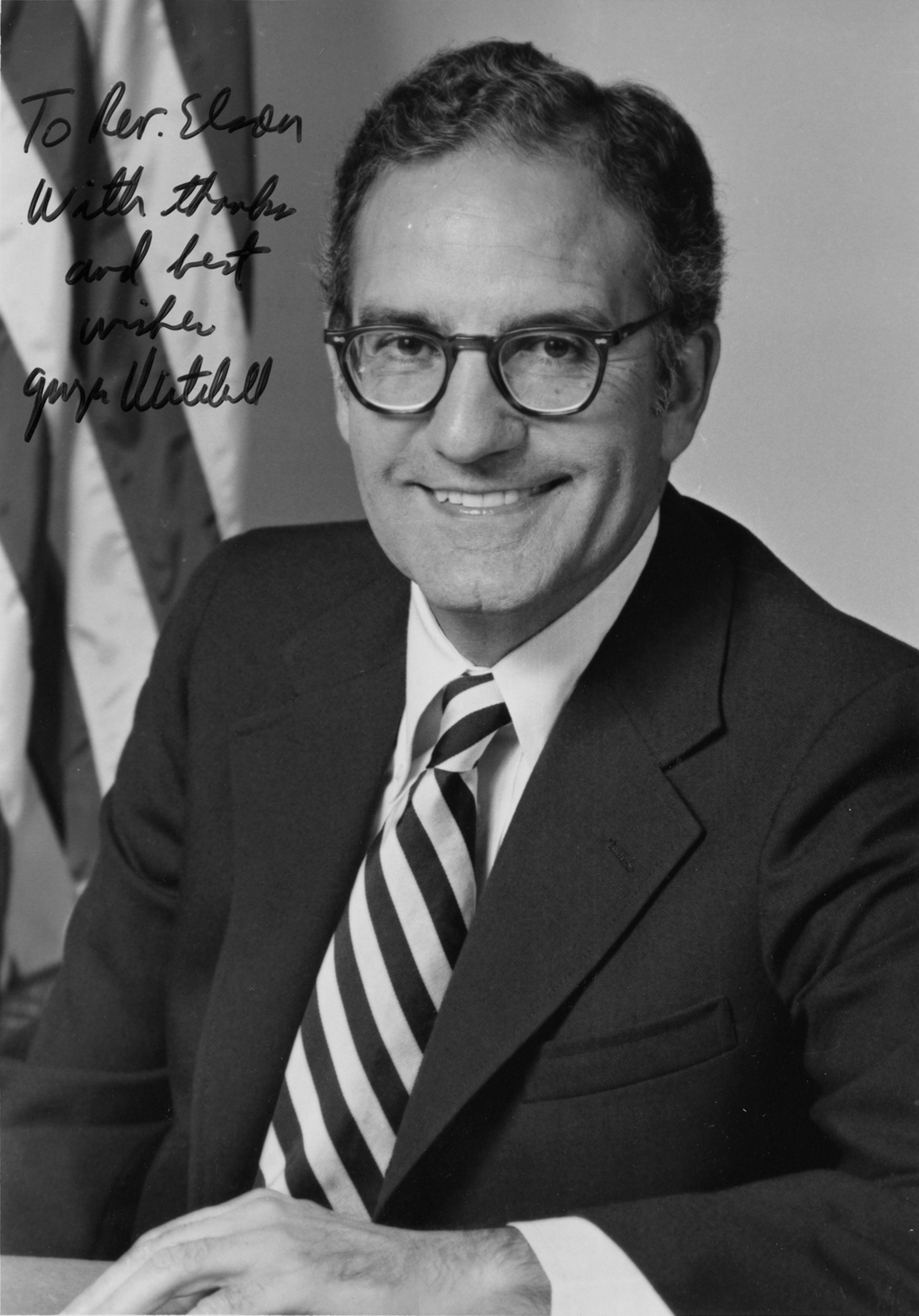
Senator and diplomat George Mitchell

- Joseph Adams, state legislator
- Justin Alfond, president of the Maine Senate
- George H. Allan, state legislator and women's suffrage proponent
- Daniel W. Ames, Civil War veteran and state legislator
- James Appleton, state legislator and activist
- Joseph E. Brennan, 70th governor of Maine
- Michael F. Brennan, mayor and state legislator
- Joshua Chamberlain, Civil War veteran, governor, surveyor of the Portland Port
- W. Edward Crockett, state legislator
- Winfred Thaxter Denison, United States assistant attorney general and secretary of the Interior for the Philippines; born in Portland
- Santo DiPietro, Maine state legislator and businessman; born in Portland
- Neal Dow, mayor of Portland; Civil War general; temperance movement leader
- John Eder, state legislator and Maine Green Independent Party organizer
- William P. Fessenden, U.S. senator
- Fletcher Hale, U.S. congressman from New Hampshire
- Charles Harlow, mayor of Portland; state legislator
- Anne Haskell, state legislator
- Jon Hinck, state legislator and attorney
- John Lynch, U.S. congressman
- George Mitchell, U.S. Senate majority leader (1989 to 1995); chairman of Walt Disney Company; U.S. special envoy to the Middle East
- Merle Nelson, state legislator
- William Pitt Preble, justice of the Maine Supreme Court; U.S. minister to the Netherlands; president of the St. Lawrence and Atlantic Railroad
- Anne Rand, state legislator
- Thomas Brackett Reed, U.S. congressman; speaker of the U.S. House of Representatives
- George Ruby, Black Republican legislator in Reconstruction-era Texas; raised in Portland
- Heather Sanborn, attorney, businesswoman, Maine Public Advocate, and Maine State Senator
- James E. Thorne, state legislator
- William Tyng, Cumberland County sheriff and legislator prior to the American revolution
- Charles W. Walton, U.S. congressman
- Herman W. Waterman, politician from Wisconsin

== Professionals ==
- Edville Gerhardt Abbott, surgeon
- Oscar Cox, lawyer
- Walter M. Fleming, physician, founder of the Shriners
- Alexander Wadsworth Longfellow Jr., architect
- Robert E. McAfee, physician
- Alexander Parris, architect
- Lois Rice, College Board executive and education scholar
- Thomas J. Sparrow, architect
- Henry Aiken Worcester, 19th-century minister and vegetarian

== Sports ==
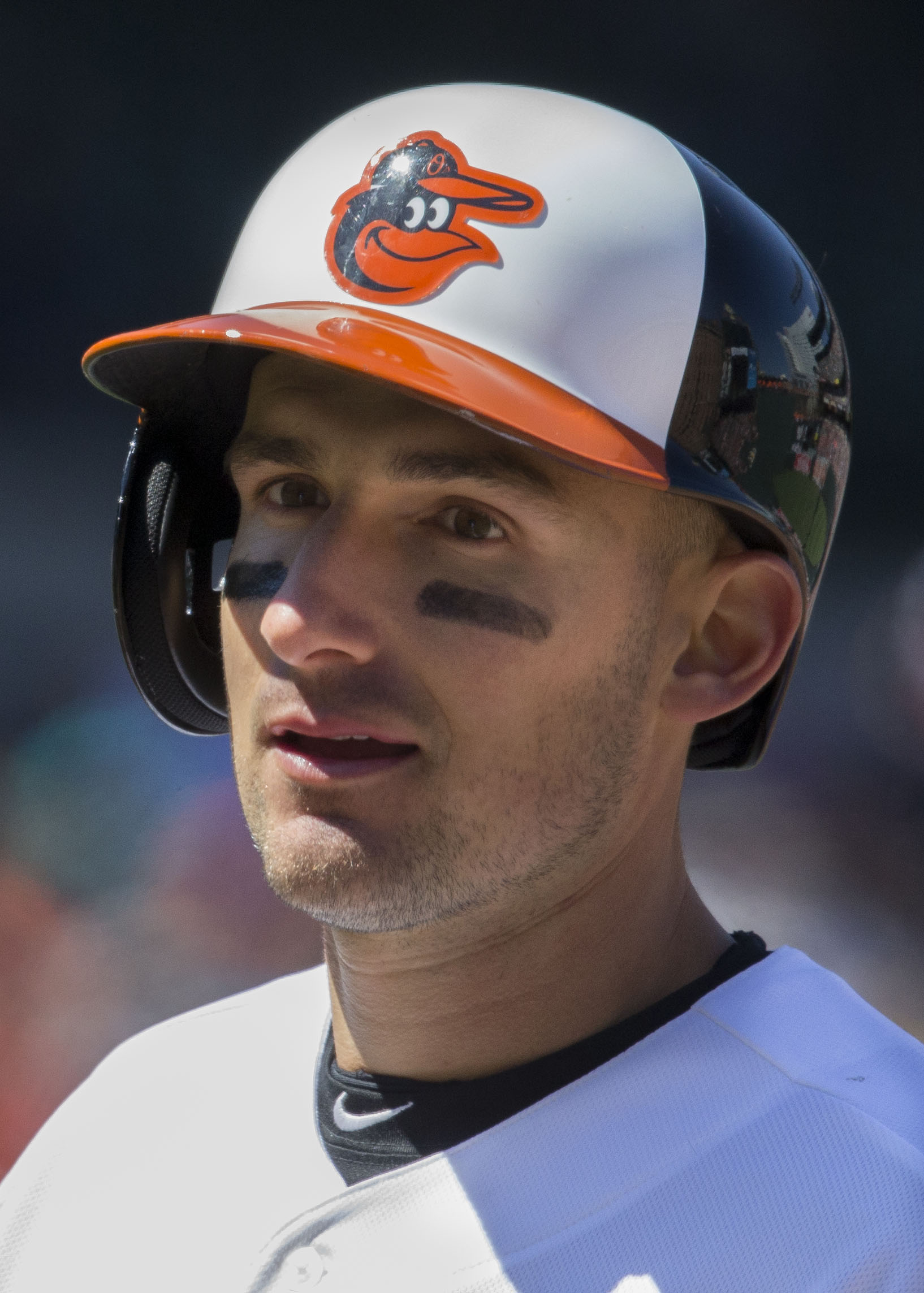
Major League Baseball player Ryan Flaherty

- Joan Benoit Samuelson (born 1957), Olympic gold medalist in the marathon and founder of the Beach to Beacon 10K
- Mike Brown (born 1975), mixed martial arts fighter
- Nik Caner-Medley (born 1983), basketball forward
- Dick Capp (born 1942), football tight end and linebacker
- Ian Crocker (born 1982), Olympic swimmer
- Emily Durgin (born 1994), distance runner
- Rob Elowitch (born 1943), wrestler
- Terry Farnsworth (born 1942), Canadian Olympic judoka
- Ryan Flaherty (born 1986), baseball second baseman
- Charlie Furbush (born 1986), baseball pitcher
- Will Geoghegan (born 1992), distance runner
- Gabe Hoffman-Johnson (born 1991), soccer player and founder of the Portland Hearts of Pine
- Rip Jordan (1889–1960), baseball pitcher
- Julia Kirtland (born 1965), distance runner
- Pete Ladd (born 1956), baseball pitcher
- Michelle Lilienthal (born 1982), distance runner
- Gary McAdam (born 1955), ice hockey forward
- Quinton Porter (born 1982), football quarterback
- Matt Rand (born 1991), distance runner
- Remilia (1995–2019), professional gamer
- Bob Stanley (born 1954), baseball pitcher
- Coley Welch (1919–2000), middleweight boxer

== Other ==
- Cornelia Dow (1842–1905), philanthropist, temperance activist; born and died in Portland
- Sarah E. Fuller (1838–1913), national president, Woman's Relief Corps; born in Portland
- Nathaniel Gordon, only American slave trader to be tried, convicted, and executed under the Piracy Law of 1820 "for being engaged in the Slave Trade"
- L. Isabel Heald (1842–1932), social leader and philanthropic worker
- Ellen Martin Henrotin, social reformer; born in Portland
- Augusta Merrill Hunt (1842–1932), philanthropist, suffragist, temperance leader; lived in Portland her entire life
- Lois Galgay Reckitt (born 1944), executive director of Family Crisis Services, Portland
- Frederick L. Small (1866–1918), stockbroker; convicted and hanged by the state of New Hampshire for the murder of his wife
