= Charles Kimball =

Charles Kimball may refer to:

- Charles D. Kimball (1859–1930), American politician and Governor of Rhode Island
- Charles F. Kimball (1831–1903), American pastoral landscape and marine painter
- Charles L. Kimball, American film editor and writer
- Charles T. Kimball, Republican member of the Michigan House of Representatives
- Charles Kimball, American Baptist minister and professor, author of When Religion Becomes Evil
- Charlie Kimball (born 1985), American racecar driver
- Charles H. Kimball (1852–1887), American architect
