= George Tate =

George Tate may refer to:

- George Tate (sports executive), American sports executive who owned the Cleveland Tate Stars baseball franchise
- George Tate (topographer) (1805–1871), English topographer, antiquarian and naturalist
- George Henry Hamilton Tate (1894–1953), English-born American zoologist and botanist
- George Tate, founder of Ashton-Tate, a US-based software company
- George Passman Tate (1856–?), authority on the history of Afghanistan
- George Tate (Royal Navy officer) (1700–1794)
- George Tate (Russian Navy officer) (1745–1821), English admiral in the Russian Navy, son of the above

== See also ==
- George Tait (disambiguation)
