= Mid Winter Classic =

American race

- Date: First Sunday in February
- Location: Cape Elizabeth, Maine
- Event type: Road Race
- Distance: 10 miles
- Established: 1982 (44 years ago)
- Participants: 1,000 (2025)

The Mid Winter Classic is an annual 10-mile road race held in Cape Elizabeth, Maine on the first Sunday in February. It began in 1982 with only 17 runners, growing to 1,000 registrants in 2025. The event is organized by the Maine Track Club and is regarded as the most competitive winter road race in Maine. It has also served as the host of the Road Runners Club of America Eastern Region Championship. Olympic medalists Joan Benoit and Lynn Jennings are among the winners of the Mid Winter Classic, along with nine runners who have competed in the U.S. Olympic Trials.

== Course ==
The start and finish lines are at Cape Elizabeth High School. The course is mostly rolling hills with some significant climbs, and the event often occurs in extremely cold conditions. The 2011 and 2022 races were cancelled due to severe winter weather, while the 2021 edition was cancelled due to the COVID-19 pandemic. The course loops through the western half of the town of Cape Elizabeth with a small segment through marshland in neighboring Scarborough. Approximately two miles of the course overlap with the Beach to Beacon 10K route along Ocean House Road.

== Awards ==
In addition to prizes for the top overall men, women, and non-binary finishers, the race offers awards for the youngest and oldest finishers, as well as top performers by weight class. $100 cash is awarded if the course record is broken in the open or masters (40+) divisions.

== Winners ==
1990-Present

Edition	Year	Men's winner	Time (m:s)	Women's winner	Time (m:s)
9th	1990	Todd Coffin	52:11	Joan Benoit	1:00:53
10th	1991	Chip Pierce	52:56	Veronica Knight	1:02:43
11th	1992	Pete Bottomley	56:58	Veronica Knight	1:02:47
12th	1993	Gilles Gautreau	56:26	Kathy Tracy	1:02:17
13th	1994	Bob Winn	52:34	Christine Reaser	1:00:38
14th	1995	Paul Johnson	57:51	Marty Shue	1:01:14
15th	1996	Rob Pierce	51:10	Lynn Jennings	59:56
16th	1997	Byrne Decker	52:00	Kristin Barry	1:01:41
17th	1998	Todd Coffin	52:55	Lynn Jennings	57:32
22nd	2003	Mike Caiazzo	54:55	Julia Kirtland	1:02:46
23rd	2004	Ethan Hemphill	53:31	Susannah Beck	58:07
24th	2005	Kevin Gray	53:01	Emily Levan	1:01:16
25th	2006	Andy Spaulding	53:23	Sheri Piers	1:04:04
26th	2007	Ethan Hemphill	52:45	Sheri Piers	1:02:39
27th	2008	Rick Roundtree	52:03	Sheri Piers	58:25
28th	2009	Peter Cameron	54:09	Sheri Piers	59:45
29th	2010	Judson Cake	50:57	Sheri Piers	1:00:45
30th	2012	Nick Wheeler	52:21	Erica Jesseman	58:01
31st	2013	Rob Gomez	51:50	Sheri Piers	57:25
32nd	2014	Dan Vassallo	51:43	Erica Jesseman	1:00:32
33rd	2015	Adam Goode	53:21	Gabrielle Wheeler	1:06:21
34th	2016	Chris Harmon	53:45	Kristin Barry	1:02:22
35th	2017	Chris Harmon	52:54	Erica Jesseman	1:01:24
36th	2018	Chris Harmon	53:14	Gabrielle Wheeler	1:02:38
37th	2019	Michael Gordon	54:00	Amanda Nurse	59:25
38th	2020	Matt Rand	52:32	Gretchen Speed	1:04:02
39th	2023	Aaron Willingham	50:58	Kali Mcgown	1:02:49
40th	2024	Adam Quinn	52:20	Veronica Graziano	59:54
41st	2025	Dan Vassallo	51:29	Courtney Hawkins	1:01:35
42nd	2026	Alec Troxell	48:42	Karley Piers	1:00:02
