= Maine Sports Hall of Fame =

The Maine Sports Hall of Fame is sports hall of fame in the U.S. state of Maine. According to the hall, it was founded in 1972 to serve two main purposes:

1. "Appointing and bestowing recognition awards and scholarships to outstanding Maine high school scholar-athletes"
2. "To formally honor and memorialize Maine athletes and sports figures who have brought distinction to the state of Maine"

To be eligible for induction into the hall, nominees must:

1. be a Maine sports figure whose achievements have brought distinction and honor to the state of Maine in any field of sport
2. be a Maine sports figure or one who has made a major contribution to the development and advancement of sports in the state of Maine
3. be a Maine sports figure having five (5) years of retirement from their last competitive event in their sports field of expertise (in extraordinary circumstances this can be waived)

The 2017 class of inductees included Bob Bahre, former owner of New Hampshire Motor Speedway and Oxford Plains Speedway; Angela Bancroft, an Ironman Triathlon competitor and coach; Brett Brown, National Basketball Association head coach for the Philadelphia 76ers; Dan Burke, founder of the Portland Sea Dogs of Minor League Baseball; Dick Capp, former tight end in the National Football League; Ian Crocker, five-time Olympic gold medalist in swimming; Norm Gagne, high school hockey coach; soccer players Glenn, Kyle, and Jay Hutchins; Leslie Krichko, Olympic skier; Sarah Marshall Ryan, standout high school and college basketball player; Tom Reynolds, college alpine skiing coach; and Anna Willard, Olympic track and field athlete.

Inducted in the 2016 class were Jack Kelley, Kristin Barry, Sheri Piers, Kirsten Clark, the Cross family, Pennie Page Cummings, Doug Friedman, Dan Hamblett, Ralph Payne, Ed Phillips, Travis Roy, and Amy Vachon. The 2015 class comprised William Alfond, Peter Carlisle, Glenn Dumont, Anna Goodale, Roger Levesque, Rob Pendergist, Marcie Lane Schulenberg, Eric Weinrich, and Amy Winchester. Sandy Thomas, a Maine native and basketball player for the Indiana University of Pennsylvania, was the first female inducted into the Maine Sports Hall of Fame.
