= Stroudwater Historic District =

Historic district in Maine, United States

- U.S. National Register of Historic Places
- U.S. Historic district
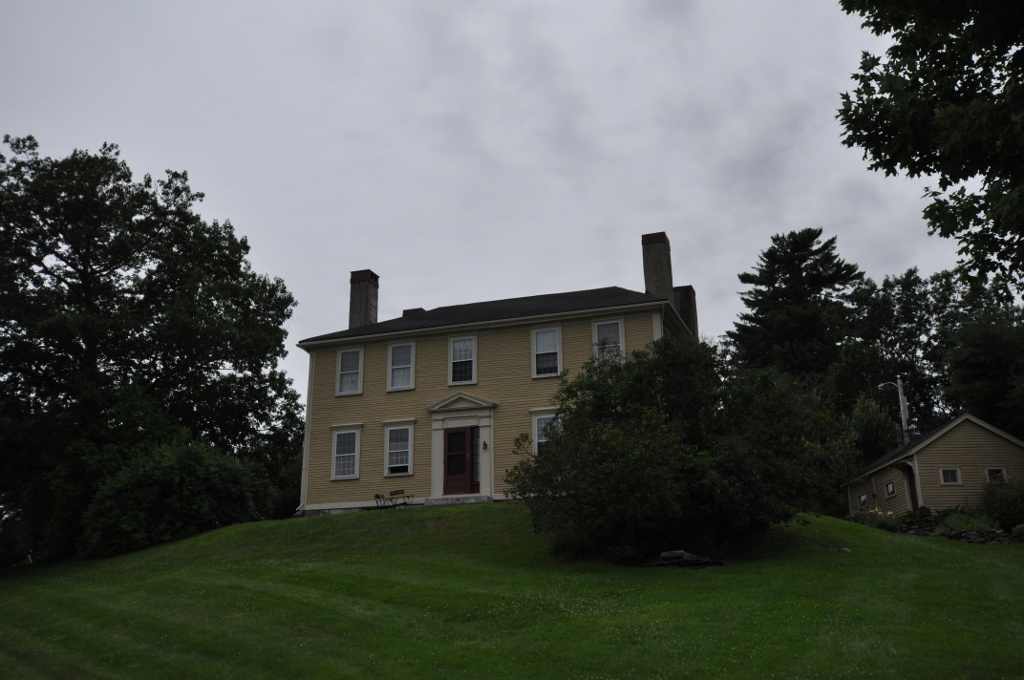
- The Means House, which stands opposite the Tate House

- Location within Maine Location within the United States
- Location: Confluence of Stroudwater and Fore Rivers, Portland, Maine
- Coordinates: 43°39′24″N 70°18′52″W
- Area: 115 acres (47 ha)
- Built: 1727
- Architectural style: Greek Revival, Mixed
- NRHP reference No.: 73000126
- Added to NRHP: February 16, 1973

Stroudwater Historic District is a historic district in the Stroudwater neighborhood of Portland, Maine. The district encompasses an important early village in the Portland area, significant as a shipbuilding and mill site established by Thomas Westbrook in 1727. The district was added to the National Register of Historic Places in 1973.

== Description and history ==
The historic center of the Stroudwater neighborhood of Portland is located on both sides of the Stroudwater River, at its mouth where it empties into the Fore River. The historic district encompasses a roughly triangular area, bounded on the northwest by a line extending along Penrith Road, the northeast by the Fore River, and the south by Garrison Street, although it extends a short way beyond Garrison on Westbrook Street. This area contains a significant concentration of houses built in the late 18th and early 19th centuries houses. It also has Stroudwater Burying Ground, one of the city's early cemeteries (the oldest marked burial dating to 1739), and the Tate House, a National Historic Landmark house built in 1755 by George Tate, a mast agent for the king. The area also has a number of mid-19th century houses, a remnant section of the Cumberland and Oxford Canal, and the archaeological remains of its early industrial past.

The Stroudwater area was first settled by Europeans in the 17th century, with a sawmill near the Stroudwater falls. This settlement was abandoned in the 1680s due to conflict with local Native Americans. In 1727 the area was resettled by Colonel Thomas Westbrook, who was hired as the mast agent for the government of King George II. He built some of the early roads through the area, in part to facilitate the hauling of masts to a ship landing on the river. He built an early dam and bridge across the river, as well as sawmills and gristmills, in effect establishing an early industrial village. Business flourished in the area until trade was halted by the Embargo Act of 1807 and the War of 1812, but saw a revival with the construction of the Cumberland and Oxford Canal. The canal was eventually overtaken in economic importance by railroads, and it was a railroad bridge which cut the area's wharves and shipbuilding facilities from the harbor. It has since become a predominantly residential part of the city.

== See also ==
- Spring Street Historic District
- Western Promenade Historic District
- National Register of Historic Places listings in Portland, Maine
