= Bob Winn =

American distance runner

Robert "Bob" Winn JR
Personal information
- Born: 14 November 1958 (age 67) Wells, Maine, United States

Sport
- Country: United States
- Event(s): Marathon, half marathon, 10 km, 5km
- College team: Central Connecticut State University

Achievements and titles
- Personal best: Marathon: 2:21:36

Bob Winn is an American distance runner, coach, teacher and local politician. He was inducted into the Maine Running Hall of Fame in 1997, as well as Central Connecticut State University in 2006 and Wells High School Hall of Fame. He was a Maine educator for 36 years and coach for over 40. He also served on the town of Ogunquit Select Board for over a decade.

== Early life ==
Winn grew up in Wells, Maine, and attended Wells High School, where he was a standout athlete in cross country and track. He enrolled at Central Connecticut State University (CCSU), where he broke the school record in the 10,000 meters and was a two-time All-New England cross country runner. He graduated in 1982 and was inducted into the CCSU Hall of Fame in 2006.

== Career ==
Winn returned to Wells and became a teacher and cross country coach for Wells High School. He continued running competitively, winning road races from Southern Maine to the South Shore of Massachusetts.

Winn won the Maine Marathon in 1982 and 1992, and the Mid Winter Classic in 1994.

He was the winner at the 1998 USA Masters Cross Country Championship at age 40. Winn also won the Maine Men’s division of the Beach to Beacon 10K in 1998, the race’s inaugural year. He repeated as Maine Champion in 1999.

Winn and Sam Mills are the only two men to win both the Maine Marathon and the Maine division of the Beach to Beacon 10K.

Winn coached track through 2017. Wells High School administrators announced in 2021 that a $1,000 scholarship would be awarded to two Wells High School seniors each year in honor of Winn’s several-decade service to the school.

In 2009, Winn was elected to the town of Ogunquit Select Board, on which he served until 2020.
