= Kristin Barry =

American distance runner (born 1973)

Personal information
- Born: 9 October 1973 (age 52) South Portland, Maine, United States

Sport
- Country: United States
- Event(s): Marathon, half marathon
- College team: Dartmouth College
- Team: Dirigo RC

Achievements and titles
- Personal best(s): Marathon: 2:40:38; Half Marathon: 1:15:50; 10 km: 34:35

Kristin Barry (born 1973) is an American distance runner and coach. She competed in the 2008 and 2012 U.S. Olympic Trials marathon.

== Early life ==
Barry grew up in South Portland, Maine and graduated from South Portland High School in 1992. She attended Dartmouth College where she ran cross country and track, graduating in 1996.

== Career ==
Barry won the 1996 Maine Marathon only a few months after finishing college. Her first notable performance at a major marathon came in the 2003 Boston Marathon, where she placed 22nd. Barry won the Mid Winter Classic in 1997 and 2016.

In 2007, she set a new personal best of 2:45:37 at the Philadelphia Marathon, which qualified her for the 2008 U.S. Olympic Trials Marathon. At the Olympic Trials in Boston, Barry recorded a time of 2:46:58 to place 73rd of 148 women.

As a resident of Scarborough, Maine, Barry won the Maine Women's division of the 2008 Beach to Beacon 10K. Her time of 34:38 broke the record for Maine women, which had stood since 1998.

The following summer, Barry's friend and training partner, Sheri Piers, lowered the record to 34:17. Barry reclaimed the Maine Women's title in 2010.

In the fall of 2010, Barry finished 27th at the New York City Marathon in a time of 2:42:01, which qualified her for the 2012 U.S. Olympic Trials Marathon in Houston.

Barry had knee surgery in early 2011, but returned to form in the fall by winning the Maine Half Marathon. At the 2012 Olympic Trials Marathon, Barry placed 83rd of 185 women.

After battling injuries in 2013 and 2014, Barry at age 41 placed 5th among Masters women at the 2015 Boston Marathon.

Barry is one of only three Maine women to win both the Maine Marathon and the Maine title at the Beach to Beacon 10K, along with Emily Levan and Erica Jesseman.

== Personal ==
Barry works as a lawyer and has two children. She has previously been a cross country and track coach at Cheverus High School in Portland, Maine.
