= Emily Levan =

American distance runner (born 1973)

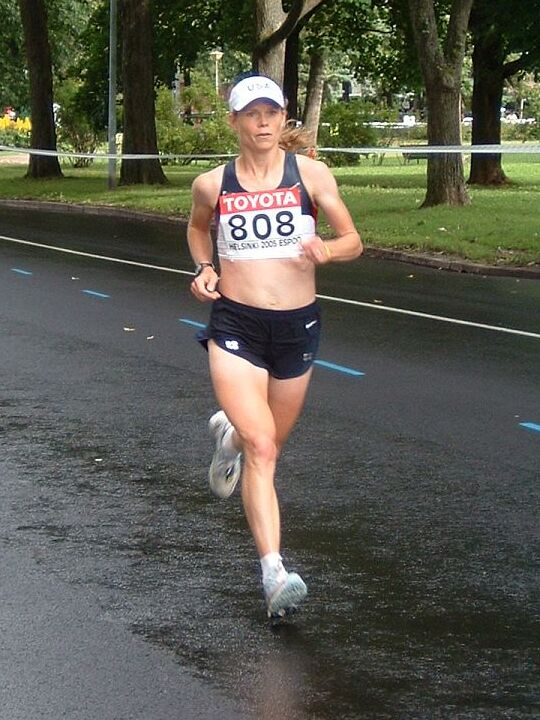
- Levan in 2005

Personal information
- Born: 15 January 1973 (age 53) Oklahoma City, Oklahoma, United States

Sport
- Country: United States
- Event: Marathon
- College team: Bowdoin College

Achievements and titles
- Personal best(s): Marathon: 2:37:01; 10 km: 35:02

Emily Levan (born 15 January 1973) is a retired American distance runner who specialized in the marathon. She was the top American finisher in the 2005 and 2006 Boston Marathon. She also competed in the 2005 IAAF World Championships and the 2008 U.S. Olympic Trials marathon.

== Early life ==
Levan grew up in Oklahoma City. Her primary sport was field hockey, but she also played soccer and ran track. After graduating from the Casady School in 1991, she attended Bowdoin College, where she became an All-New England field hockey player. As of 2020, she ranked among the top 10 in school history in goals and assists.

== Career ==
Levan ran her first marathon in 1998, but didn't break 3 hours until the 2002 Maine Marathon, which she won in 2:47:38. The following spring, she lowered her time to 2:41:37 at the Boston Marathon. This result qualified her for the 2004 U.S. Olympic Trials Marathon.

Due to the birth of her daughter, Levan did not compete in the 2004 Olympic Trials. She returned to marathoning in the fall of 2004 at the New York City Marathon, where she placed 17th.

In the winter of 2005, Levan won the Mid Winter Classic. In the spring, she was the top American woman at the Boston Marathon in a time of 2:43:14. Over the summer, she represented Team USA at the 2005 IAAF World Championships in Finland, placing 35th in the marathon.

Levan repeated as top American woman at the 2006 Boston Marathon. She followed that up with a 24th-place finish at the USA 20K Championship and a seventh place result at the Twin Cities Marathon.

During the peak of her running career, Levan resided in Wiscasset, Maine. She was a dominant force in the Maine road racing circuit, winning the Maine Women's division of the Beach to Beacon 10K in 2005, 2006, and 2007.

Levan is one of only three Maine women to win both the Maine Marathon and the Maine division of the Beach to Beacon 10K, along with Kristin Barry and Erica Jesseman.

In 2008, Levan returned to Boston to compete in the U.S. Olympic Trials Marathon, where she placed 67th of 148 women.

== Personal ==
Levan is a registered nurse and lives in Randolph, Vermont with her husband and daughter. In 2021, Levan and her husband ran 210 miles along route 110 in Vermont to raise money for Diabetes research. In 2008, Levan raised over $75,000 for the Children's Cancer Program in support of her daughter Maddie, who is a survivor of leukemia.
