= Verrill =

Verrill is an English surname. Notable people with the surname include:

- Addison Emery Verrill (1839–1926), American zoologist, museum curator, and professor
- Alpheus Hyatt Verrill (1871–1954), American archaeologist, explorer, inventor, illustrator, and author
- Lindsey Verrill (born 1982), American musician
- Louise Brown Verrill (1870–1948), American composer
- Virginia Verrill (1916–1999), American singer

== Organizations ==
- Verrill, LLP, American Law Firm

== Fictional characters ==
- Jordy Verrill, in the short story "Weeds" by Stephen King
