= Stroudwater Burying Ground =

Cemetery in Portland, Maine

- Interactive map of Stroudwater Burying Ground

Details
- Established: 1727 (299 years ago)
- Location: Westbrook Street, Portland, Maine,
- Country: United States
- Coordinates: 43.65807°N 70.31469°W
- Find a Grave: Stroudwater Burying Ground

Stroudwater Burying Ground is a historic cemetery in Portland, Maine, United States. Established in 1727 and located on Westbrook Street, it is now a contributing property to the Stroudwater Historic District, listed on the National Register of Historic Places. It is the burial place of many of the town's early settlers, with the earliest legible headstone dating to 1739.

Notable burials include George Tate, Royal Navy captain, whose former home stands nearby, and temperance worker Lillian M. N. Stevens.
