= Erica Jesseman =

American distance runner (born 1989)

Personal information
- Born: 21 January 1989 (age 37) Scarborough, Maine, United States

Sport
- Country: United States
- Event(s): Marathon, half marathon
- College team: University of New Hampshire
- Team: Dirigo RC

Achievements and titles
- Personal best(s): Marathon: 2:38:13; Half Marathon: 1:14:43; 10 km: 34:18

Erica Jesseman is an American distance runner who specializes in the marathon. She is a four-time winner of the Hartford Marathon, and she also competed in the 2012 and 2016 U.S. Olympic Trials Marathon.

== Early life ==
Jesseman grew up in Scarborough, Maine and attended Scarborough High School. She won the 2006 Maine Class A Cross Country Championship and earned a full scholarship to the University of New Hampshire. At UNH, Jesseman recorded personal-best times of 16:24.09 in the 5,000 meters and 34:30.30 in the 10,000 meters.

== Career ==
After graduating from college in 2011, Jesseman quickly moved up to longer distances. She won the 2011 Hartford Marathon in a time of 2:45:00, which qualified her for the 2012 U.S. Olympic Trials Marathon.

At the Olympic Trials in Houston, Jesseman claimed 88th place out of 185 women.

Her first major marathon came at the 2013 Boston Marathon, where she placed 25th in a time of 2:44:35. Later that year, she won the Maine Women's division of the Beach to Beacon 10K in her home state of Maine.

In the fall, she won the Hartford Marathon for the second time, clocking a new personal-best of 2:38:13.

She notched another top-30 finish at the Boston Marathon in 2014, taking 27th in a time of 2:42:32. Later that year in Harford, she earned her third marathon win in a time of 2:40:58.

In the summer of 2015, Jesseman reclaimed the Maine Women's title at the Beach to Beacon 10K, after losing to Michelle Lilienthal in 2014. She won the Mid Winter Classic in 2012 and 2014. In the fall of 2015, Jesseman won her fourth overall, and third consecutive, Hartford Marathon.

In the 2016 U.S. Olympic Trials Marathon in Los Angeles, Jesseman finished 99th of 205 women in hot, sunny conditions.

Jesseman won the 2019 Maine Marathon in a time of 2:59:33.

Jesseman is one of only three Maine women to win both the Maine Marathon and the Maine title of the Beach to Beacon 10K, along with Emily Levan and Kristin Barry.

== Personal ==
Jesseman lives in Scarborough, Maine and works in special education. She has also served as an assistant cross country and track coach at Saint Joseph's College of Maine.
