= Dan Vassallo =

American distance runner (born 1985)

Personal information
- Born: 28 April 1985 (age 41) Wilmington, Massachusetts, United States

Sport
- Country: United States
- Events: Marathon, half marathon
- College team: Colby College
- Team: Central Mass Striders

Achievements and titles
- Personal best: Marathon: 2:17:28

Dan Vassallo is an American distance runner who specializes in the marathon. He competed collegiately for Colby College before shifting to marathon racing. Vassallo is a two-time winner of the Philadelphia Marathon (2010 and 2014), and he competed in the U.S. Olympic Trials Marathon in 2016, 2020, and 2024.

== Early life ==
Vassallo grew up in Wilmington, Massachusetts in a family of soccer players. His father was an All-American player at Westfield State University. A soccer coach of Vassallo’s encouraged him to start running competitively, which he did in his sophomore year at Wilmington High School. He went on to run cross country and track at Colby College, where he set a school record in the 10,000 meters by running 30:52.79.

== Career ==
Vassallo began marathoning immediately after graduating from Colby in 2007, representing the Central Mass Striders. He won the 2007 Maine Marathon in 2:26:54, which broke the previous course record. He was victorious again in 2012, lowering his course record to 2:21:12.

In 2010, he won the Philadelphia Marathon. Vassallo returned four years later to win the 2014 edition in a time of 2:17:28, which qualified him for the 2016 Olympic Trials Marathon in Los Angeles. On a hot and sunny day in Southern California, Vassallo finished the Trials in 41st place.

At the 2018 Boston Marathon, Vassallo finished 10th in cold, wet, and windy conditions. Later that year, he ran a time of 2:17:27 at the California International Marathon, which qualified him for the 2020 United States Olympic Trials (marathon) in Atlanta.

Vassallo placed 100th of 235 men at the 2020 Olympic Trials Marathon on a hilly course through downtown Atlanta.

Following the COVID-19 pandemic, he returned to marathoning at the 2022 Baystate Marathon in Lowell, MA, where he set a new course record time of 2:19:45.

In the fall of 2023, Vassallo qualified for the 2024 United States Olympic Trials (marathon) with a 2:17:39 performance at the McKirdy Micro Marathon in Valley Cottage, NY. Despite dealing with an injury in the lead up to the Olympic Trials in Orlando, FL, Vassallo was able to complete the Trials in sunny, hot conditions, placing 129th of 200 men.

Vassallo is one of 13 American men who finished the three U.S. Olympic Trials marathons from 2016 to 2024.

Vassallo won the Mid Winter Classic in 2014 and 2025.

==== Masters ====
Vassallo was the top Masters finisher (age 40+) at the 2025 Grandma's Marathon with a time of 2:29:35. He was the ninth Masters finisher and 73rd overall at the 2025 New York City Marathon.

In November 2026, Vassallo won the Masters division of the Indianapolis Monumental Marathon in a time of 2:18:41.

== Personal ==
As of 2024, Vassallo lives in Peabody, Massachusetts, with his partner and works as a corporate controller.
