= George Tait =

George Tait is the name of:

- George Tait (footballer) (1859–1882), English footballer
- George Tait (inventor) (1912–1993), Canadian inventor
- George Edward Tait (1943–2017), American poet

== See also ==
- George Tate (disambiguation)
