= Tate House (Portland, Maine) =

Historic house in Maine, United States

- U.S. National Register of Historic Places
- U.S. National Historic Landmark
- U.S. Historic district – Contributing property
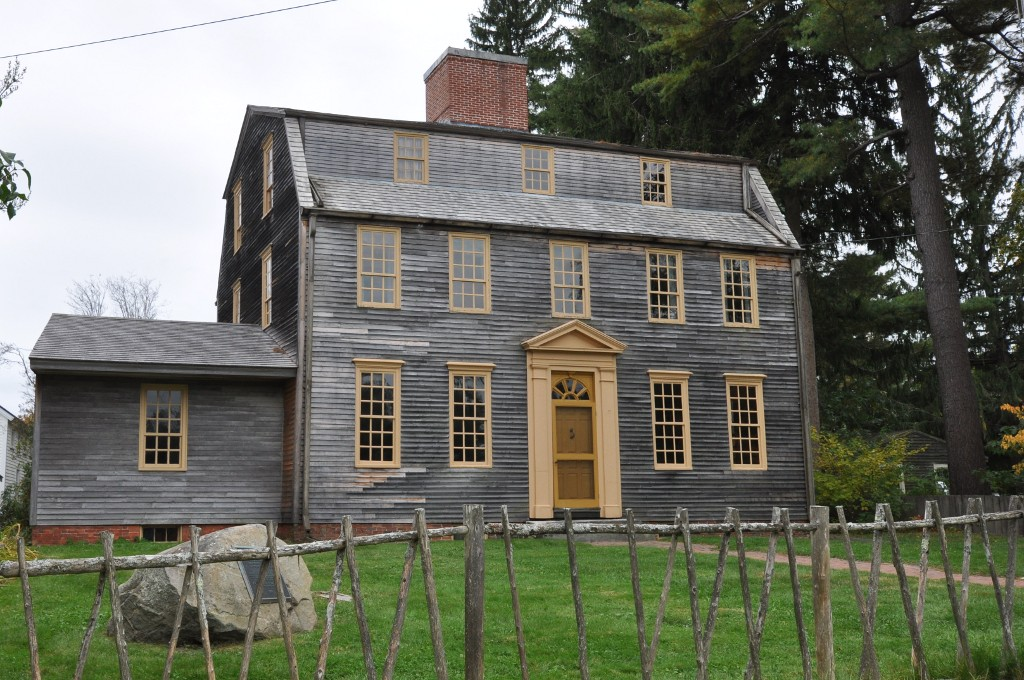
- Pictured in 2013
- Location: 1270 Westbrook St; Stroudwater, Portland, Maine
- Coordinates: 43°39′27″N 70°18′44″W
- Built: 1755
- Architect: George Tate
- Architectural style: Georgian
- Part of: Stroudwater Historic District (ID73000126)
- NRHP reference No.: 70000072

Significant dates
- Added to NRHP: January 12, 1970
- Designated NHL: November 11, 1971
- Designated CP: February 16, 1973

The Tate House is a historic house museum at 1270 Westbrook Street, near the Fore River in the Stroudwater neighborhood of Portland, Maine, United States. The house, one of the oldest in Portland, was built in 1755 for George Tate, a former Royal Navy captain who was sent by a contractor to the Navy to oversee the felling and shipment of trees for use as masts. Because of the house's comparatively remote location relative to downtown Portland, it (along with a number of other homes that make up the Stroudwater Historic District) survived Portland's numerous fires intact. The house was designated a National Historic Landmark as a rare surviving example of a once-common colonial housing form, the clerestory gambrel roof. Since 1935, it has been a museum operated by the National Society of the Colonial Dames.

== Description and history ==
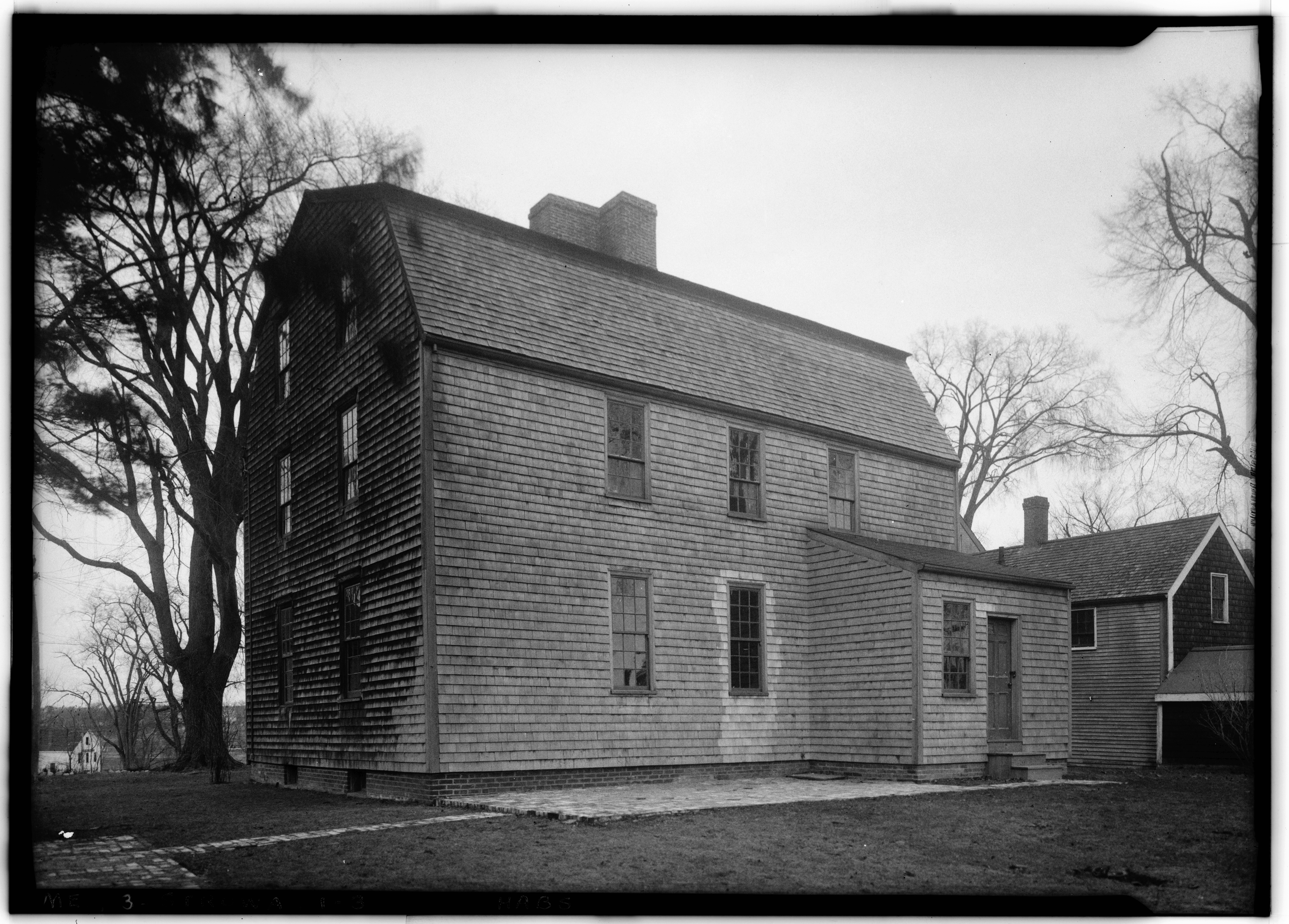
The rear of the building, pictured in 1936

The Tate House is set on a rise above the north bank of the Stroudwater River, shortly before it empties into the Fore River on the west side of Portland. It is a 2 1/2-story wood-frame structure, five bays wide, with a large central chimney. Its unusual roof line has a basic two-stage gambrel form, except the steeper-pitched lower section is separated from the upper section by a bank of clerestory windows. This form, once common in northern New England, is only known to survive in one other building in Maine, the Burnham Tavern. The house is clad in unfinished clapboards. The interior has a typical center-chimney plan, with a narrow vestibule and winding stair at the front. The first floor is otherwise divided into three rooms: living room/parlor to the right, dining room to the left, and a large kitchen extending across the back. The second floor has three bedrooms, and the third has two more. The public rooms of the house feature high-quality Georgian carved paneling, which is believed to have been brought over from England.

In 2014, an archaeological dig at the Tate House found significant wares from the 1750s to 1780s. Pieces of 1750s salt-glazed stoneware, 1760s creamware and 1780s pearlware were discovered. Also found was a white piece of porcelain with tiny brass fears. The dig occurred prior to work beginning on repairing the drainage system. The drainage problem, which funnels water into the basement, creates a significant amount of moisture and poses a threat to the rest of the house. The drainage repair issue will cost $10,000 to $12,000.

== See also ==
- List of National Historic Landmarks in Maine
- National Register of Historic Places listings in Portland, Maine
