= Will Geoghegan =

American distance runner (born 1992)

Personal information
- Born: July 15, 1992 (age 34) Brunswick, Maine, United States

Sport
- Country: United States
- Events: 1,500 meters, Mile, 3,000 meters, 5,000 meters
- College team: Dartmouth College University of Oregon

Achievements and titles
- Personal bests: 1,500 meters: 3:40.05; Mile: 3:56.24; 3,000 meters: 7:45.71; 5,000 meters: 13:17.85

William Geoghegan (born 15 July 1992) is an American former professional long-distance runner. He had a decorated high school career in Maine before earning multiple NCAA All-American honors at Dartmouth College and the University of Oregon. Geoghegan competed professionally for Nike for five years. He won the 2015 Manchester Road Race.

== High School ==
Geoghegan grew up in Brunswick, Maine and attended Brunswick High School. He was a talented baseball pitcher before deciding to focus solely on running in high school. Geoghegan won multiple individual Maine Class A state championships in cross country, the 800 meters, mile, and two mile events. He also won the 2010 New England Championship in the mile. After his senior year, Geoghegan was named the Maine Gatorade Player of the Year for cross country and outdoor track. The Maine Sunday Telegram awarded Geoghegan the All-Sports Athlete of the Year for Maine high schoolers.

== Dartmouth ==
Geoghegan enrolled at Dartmouth College in 2010 and continued his running career with the Big Green. Geoghegan became a national-class collegiate runner, beginning with the fall 2013 cross country season when he placed 10th at the NCAA Championship. On the indoor track, Geoghegan recorded a mile time of 3:58.04, which broke the Ivy League record. Later in the season, he earned an All-American award when he placed fifth in the mile final at the 2014 NCAA Championship.

Over the summer, Geoghegan won the Maine Men's division of the 2014 Beach to Beacon 10K in his home state of Maine.

== Oregon ==
For his final year of NCAA track eligibility, Geoghegan transferred to the University of Oregon. Competing for the Ducks, Geoghegan placed second in the 3,000 meters at the 2015 Millrose Games. The next month at the NCAA Indoor Championship, Geoghegan finished third in the 3,000 meters and seventh in the 5,000 meters. Outdoors, he took fourth in the 5,000 meters at the NCAA Championship.

== Professional ==
Geoghegan signed a professional contract with Nike in June 2015. He continued racing after the NCAA season ended, dropping down to the 1,500 meters at the USA Championships, where he placed eighth.

On the roads in the fall of 2015, Geoghegan won the national-class Manchester Road Race in Connecticut by outkicking Olympian Donn Cabral. In 2016, Geoghegan was unable to replicate his success on the track and fell short of qualifying for the 2016 United States Olympic Trials (track and field).

In 2017, Geoghegan ran 3:40.97 in the 1,500 meters to qualify for the USA Championship in Sacramento, where he placed 10th in the final.

Geoghegan was a member of Team USA in the mixed 4x1km relay at the 2018 Great Edinburgh International Cross Country event in Scotland.

In 2025 as a resident of Portland, Maine, Geoghegan placed second in the Maine Half Marathon with a time of 1:06:00.
