= Susannah Beck =

American distance runner (born 1968)

Personal information
- Born: 1 May 1968 (age 58) Yarmouth, Maine, United States

Sport
- Country: United States
- Event(s): Marathon, half marathon
- College team: Yale University

Achievements and titles
- Personal best(s): Marathon: 2:34:44; Half Marathon: 1:13:03; 10 km: 33:46

Susannah Beck (born 1 May 1968) is a retired American distance runner who specialized in marathons and ultra trail running. She placed fourth at the 2000 U.S. Olympic Trials marathon and eighth in 2004. Beck shifted to long-distance trail racing in her later career.

== Early life ==
Beck grew up in Yarmouth, Maine and attended the Waynflete School in Portland, Maine for high school. At Waynflete, she was coached by Andy Palmer and became a national-class cross country runner. Beck won the 1985 Maine Class B State Cross Country Championship and placed as high as fifth at the U.S.A National Championship. Beck enrolled at Yale University with the intent to run competitively, but a combination of injuries and stress from school led to her quitting the sport in 1989.

== Career ==
After college, Beck moved to Eugene, Oregon for work. There she had access to some of the best fitness terrain in the country and numerous running friends with whom she could train. Beck regained her old form and became a national-class runner once again. Her breakthrough performance came in 1998 when she won the USA 12 km Championship.

In 1999, Beck clocked a time of 2:38:50 at Grandma's Marathon in Duluth, MN, which qualified her for the 2000 U.S. Olympic Trials Marathon. At the Olympic Trials in South Carolina, Beck placed fourth of 170 women, narrowly missing an Olympic berth. Later in 2000, she placed third at the USA 25 km Championship and sixth at the USA Half Marathon Championship.

In 2001, Beck finished 15th at the Boston Marathon, third at the USA Half Marathon Championship, and 43rd at the IAAF World Half Marathon Championship in England.

Beck ran 2:36:34 at the 2002 Twin Cities Marathon, which qualified her for the 2004 U.S. Olympic Trials Marathon. In the summer of 2002, Beck placed seventh in a world-class field at the Beach to Beacon 10K with a time of 33:46.

She ran her personal-best half marathon time of 1:13:03 at the 2003 Duluth Half Marathon.

At the 2004 U.S. Olympic Trials Marathon in St. Louis, Beck placed eighth of 121 women in a time of 2:34:44. Later that year, Beck relocated to her home state of Maine and won the Maine Women's division of the Beach to Beacon 10K. She also won the 2004 Mid Winter Classic.

After 2004, Beck shifted her focus to ultra-marathons and trail races. She won the 2008 USA National Championship at 50 miles and finished second at the North Face 50-Miler in San Francisco. USATF named Beck the female Ultra Runner of the Year for 2008.

Other notable trail results include her victory at the Xterra Trail Half Marathon Championship in 2008 and her runner-up finish in the same event in 2009.

Beck was inducted into the Maine Running Hall of Fame in 2014.

== Personal ==
Since 2012, Beck has managed her family business, the Maine Environmental Laboratory, in Yarmouth, Maine.
