= Charles F. Kimball =

American painter (1831–1903)

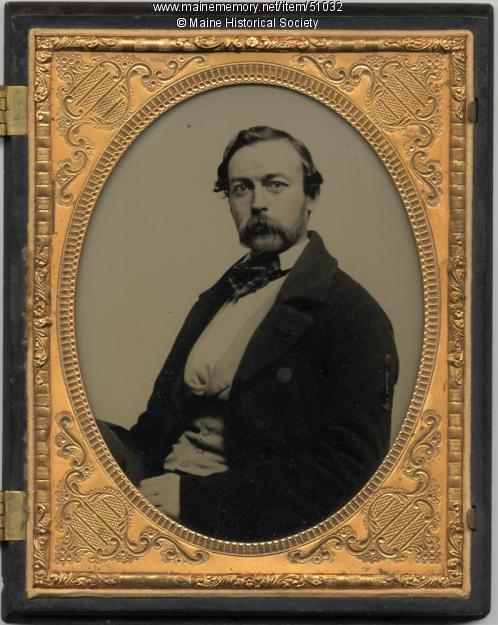
Charles Frederick Kimball

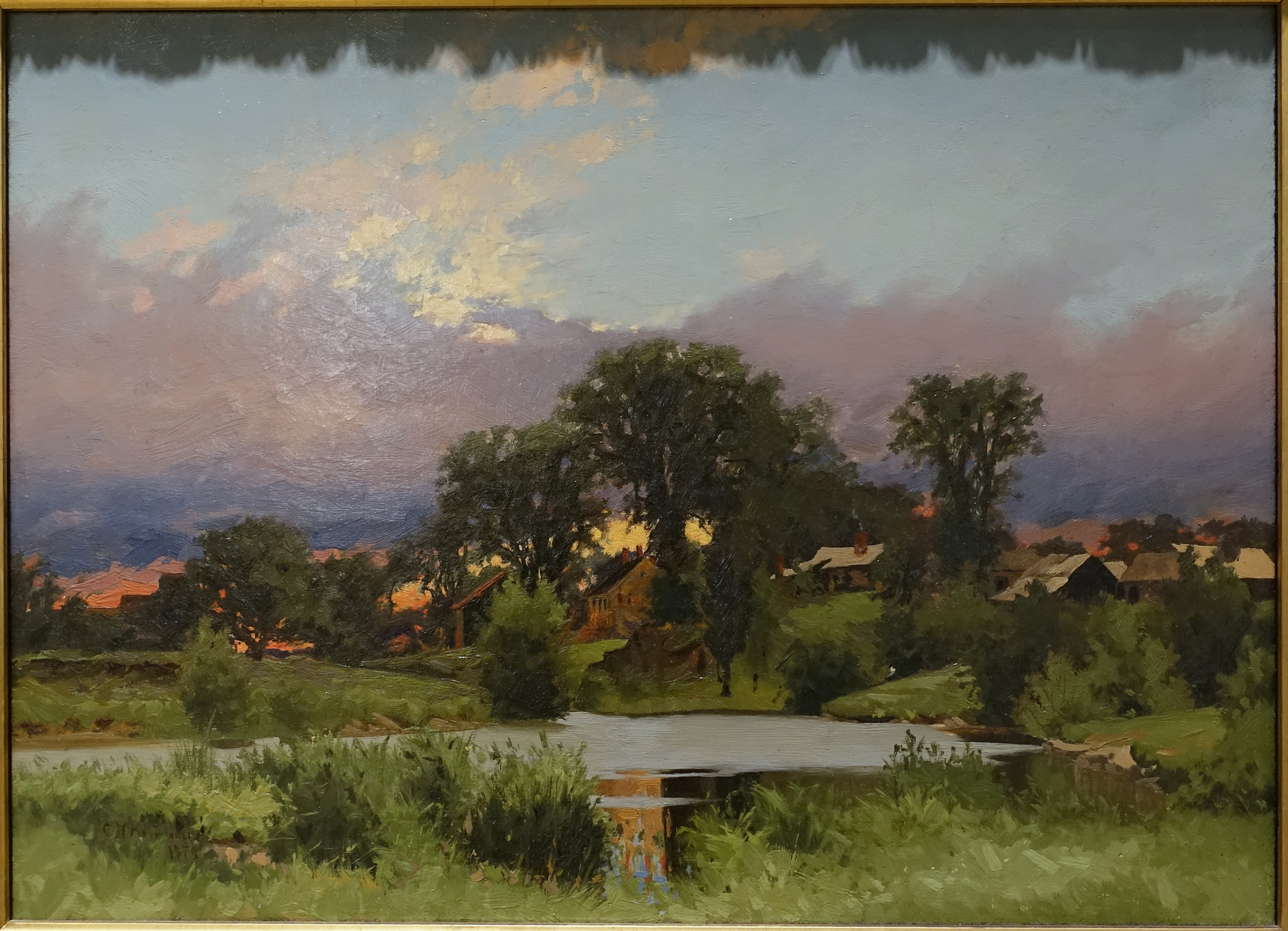
Twilight at Stroudwater, by Charles F. Kimball, 1879

Charles Frederick Kimball (1831–1903) was a 19th-century American painter who focused on pastoral landscapes and marine art. He was also an etcher and a master cabinet maker. He was active in Portland, Maine.

== Early life ==
A native of Maine, Charles Frederick Kimball was born in Monmouth, Maine on October 31, 1831, the youngest of thirteen children, into a family of architects and builders.

== Career ==
He was largely self-taught. He showed local scenery paintings as early as 1853. He along with fellow landscape artist, John Bradley Hudson, Jr., shared a passion for painting en plein air, traveling around Casco Bay and Portland with their easels and brushes painting local scenery. It was these works that brought him notice. It showed his appreciation for the gentle shifts in the evening light. At this point in this career he was influenced by the Hudson River School.

He studied with Portland artist, Charles Octavius Cole and John Greenleaf Cloudman. He was a member of the Brush'uns, a group of artists who went on sketching trips together.

After gaining recognition as a gifted artist, Kimball quit painting professionally in 1863 to work as a stair builder and cabinet maker. He continued to paint as a hobby and his work found a wide regional audience. Despite his growing popularity, he did not want to commercialize his work. When he did sell a piece, it was through a small gallery or frame shop.

After quitting the "professional scene", his style evolved under the influence of the French Barbizon school.

== Marriage ==
In 1863, he married Annie Cloudman, daughter of John Greenleaf Cloudman, his mentor. Kimball died in 1903.

== Legacy ==
He was an active artist his whole life and a "champion of the arts" in the Portland area. He was dedicated to maintaining the local art scene. In 1882 he played a major role in the founding of the Portland Society of Arts now the Portland Museum of Art. He served as its president from 1899 until his death in 1903.

It was he and John Calvin Stevens who influenced Margaret Jane Mussey Sweat to leave the McLellan House, Portland, Maine to the Portland Art Society. The building has since become the society’s permanent home.

== Works ==
=== Paintings ===
- 1859 - Marine Hospital
- 1860 - Presumpscot River Looking Toward Blackstrap
- 1875 - The Lock
- 1875 - Down from the Hills
- 1878 - Poplars
- 1879 - Twilight at Stroudwater
- 1882 - Coal Sheds, Topsham and Brunswick
- 1899 - Midsummer Great Diamond Island, Portland Harbor
- Portland Harbor
- Country Fence and Path
- Pine Grove
- Approaching a Cove in Casco Bay
- Woodland Lane

=== Etchings ===
- 1880 - Old Houses at Stroudwater
- 1889 - Coal Sheds at Topsham

=== Collections ===
Portland Museum of Art

=== Books ===
- Charles F. Kimball: Etchings, Colby College Art Museum 1965
