= Charles L. Fox =

American painter (1854–1927)

Charles Lewis Fox
- Born: September 20, 1854; Portland, Maine
- Died: March 20, 1927 (aged 72)
- Occupations: Artist, Philanthropist, and Labor Activist

Charles Lewis Fox (September 20, 1854 – March 20, 1927) was an American artist, philanthropist and labor activist from Maine. Prominent in the Portland, Maine artist community, Fox was a proponent of socialism and twice ran for Governor of Maine on the Socialist Party of Maine ticket. He was secretary of the Brotherhood of Painters, Decorators and Paperhangers of America, Local 237.

== Early life ==
Fox was born to Archelaus Lewis Fox and Dorcas Eaton of Portland, Maine in 1854. He was a boy during the American Civil War, which ended in 1865. His family was wealthy and Fox attended Portland Public Schools before attempting to become an architect at the Massachusetts Institute of Technology. He left MIT and instead traveled to Paris, France to study art, he was also exposed to socialist ideas. In France, he studied under the guidance of Léon Bonnat and Alexandre Cabanel at the École des Beaux-Arts. He also spent time at the Gobelins Manufactory as an apprentice weaver.

== Art ==
As an artist, Fox received acclaim for his summer art school in North Bridgton, Maine as well as his oil paintings, mostly of Native Americans. His collection of paintings is housed at the Farnsworth Art Museum in Rockland. Fox operated The Fox Art School in Portland, which was a prominent regional art studio primarily for Maine residents unable to travel to New York City. The studio was cooperatively run; its motto was "to work and to paint for the brotherhood of mankind".

== Politics ==
Fox served on the national committee of the Socialist Party of America as the representative of the Socialist Party of Maine three times (1904, 1905 and 1907). He twice ran for governor. During his first campaign in 1902, Fox challenged incumbent Republican John Fremont Hill. He received 1,979 votes (1.83%) and finished in 4th place. This was a significant improvement over the 653 votes gathered by Norman Wallace Lermond in 1900. It qualified the party for official recognition. In his second campaign in 1906, Fox challenged Republican William T. Cobb. Fox received 1,551 (1.37%) vote (3 of 4).
