= McLellan House =

Historic house in Maine, United States

- U.S. National Register of Historic Places
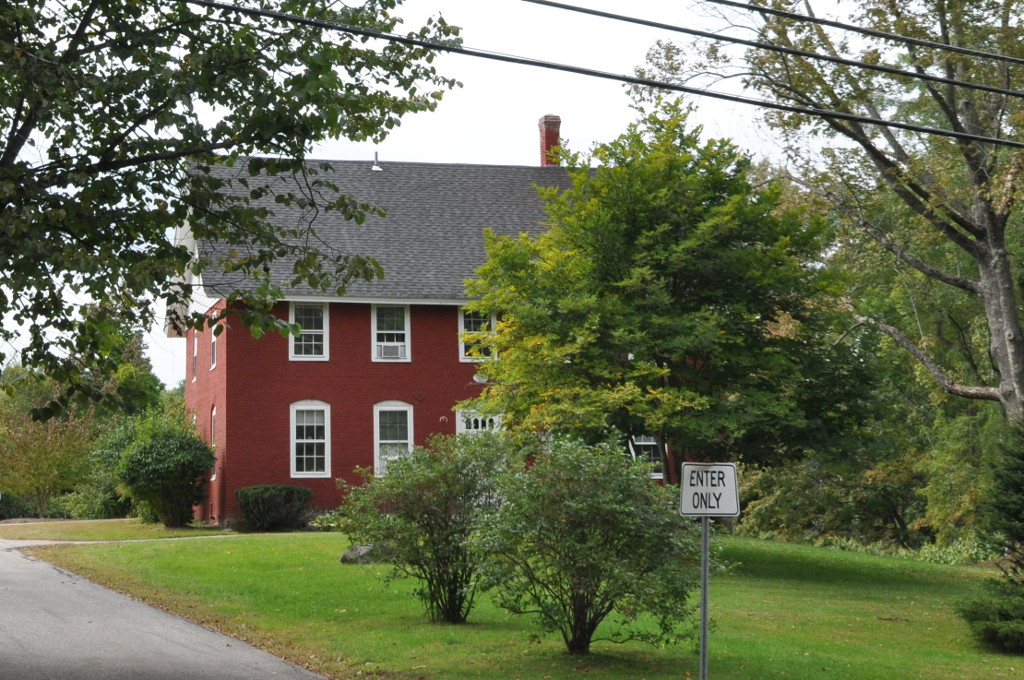

- Location within Maine Location within the United States
- Location: 140 School St., Gorham, Maine
- Coordinates: 43°41′6″N 70°26′49″W
- Area: less than one acre
- Built: 1773
- Architectural style: American colonial
- NRHP reference No.: 72000073
- Added to NRHP: December 5, 1972

The McLellan House is an historic house at 140 School Street in Gorham, Maine, USA. Built in 1773, it is the oldest known brick house in Cumberland County, and possibly the entire state. It is now part of the Gorham campus of the University of Southern Maine (USM), housing the Center for Education Policy, Applied Research, and Evaluation (CEPARE). It was listed on the National Register of Historic Places in 1972.

== Description and history ==
The McLellan House stands north of Gorham center, on the west side of School Street. It is set back on a rise overlooking the street, at the northern edge of the USM campus. It is a 2 1/2-story brick structure, five bays wide, with a side gable roof and a granite foundation. The front and right walls of the building are laid in Flemish bond, while the left and rear are laid in common bond. The gable ends are framed in wood and finished with clapboards. First-floor windows and the center entrance are set in segmented-arch openings, while second-floor windows are set in rectangular openings. The interior has been repeatedly altered, especially due to different uses by the university, but retains a few elements of original trim and styling.

The house was built in 1773 for Hugh and Elizabeth McLellan, who arrived in the area in 1740, and are counted among Gorham's earliest settlers. It is believed to be the first brick house built in Cumberland County, and is among the oldest surviving brick buildings in the state. It was acquired by Gorham State College (now the University of Southern Maine) in 1966 and converted to a dormitory. It has since been adapted for use as office space.

== See also ==
- National Register of Historic Places listings in Cumberland County, Maine
