= John Greenleaf Cloudman =

American painter

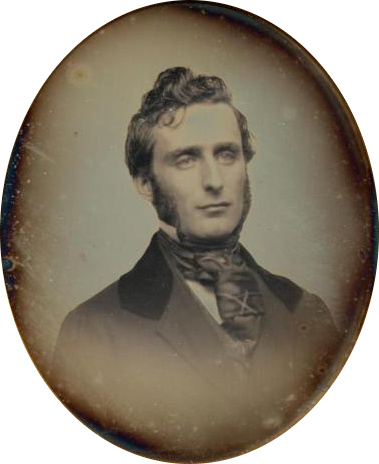
Daguerreotype of John Greenleaf Cloudman c. 1850

John Greenleaf Cloudman (sometimes referred to as Cloutman) was born in Newburyport, Massachusetts, one of seven children, on December 17, 1813 to David P. Cloudman and Susan D. Cloudman (1792–1858). He died in Bethel, Maine on October 11, 1892. He was a landscape and portrait painter.

== Background ==
Cloudman began his career as a carpenter and sign painter. He decided to become a fine artist. In 1847 he sailed to Paris, France, to study art there for one year. After Paris he went to northern California during the years 1852–53. He was known for having painted the Pomo Indians of California.

== Influenced By and Influence On ==
Cloudman was a protegee of landscape artist Charles Codman. He was the only one of Codman's students to achieve lasting fame as a painter.

Charles F. Kimball, (1831–1903) studied with Cloudman and became his son-in-law when he married Cloudman's daughter Annie in 1863.

== Works ==
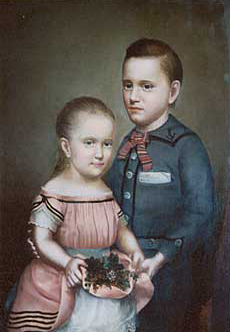
Portrait of Two Children by John Greenleaf Cloudman

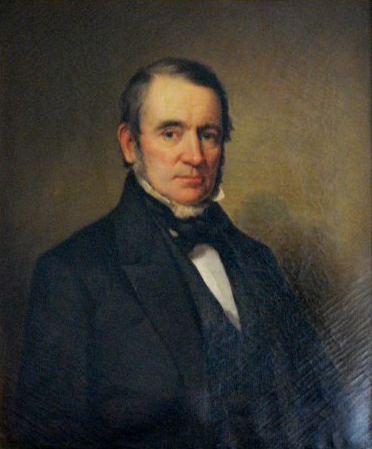
Portrait of St. John Smith by John Greenleaf Cloudman

Paintings by Cloudman are held in the core collection of the Portland Museum of Art in Maine, Maine Historical Society, Maine State Museum and the Bangor Public Library collection.
