= Stroudwater Falls =

Coordinates: 43.656348°N 70.310696°W

Stroudwater Falls is a man-made dam in Portland, Maine, dating to the 1850s. The dam is fed by the Stroudwater River, which runs from Duck Pond, in Buxton, Maine, to the Fore River in Portland. The dam, located near the Westbrook Street bridge, prevents tidal waters from the Fore River from flowing up the Stroudwater River channel.

The dam was built in the 1850s for floating logs down the Stroudwater River to the Fore River, and was expanded in the 1900s for ice harvesting. The dam can store a maximum of 221,940 cubic meters of water, and its normal reservoir storage is 187,416 cubic meters, according to city records. The dam was damaged prior to 2012 when heavy rains washed debris down the river and it struck the dam.
