= Socialist Party of Maine =

- Ideology: Socialism; Socialist feminism
- National affiliation: SPA; SPUSA
- Colors: Red

The Socialist Party of Maine was a multi-tendency socialist political party in the U.S. state of Maine. During its first incarnation in the early 20th century, prominent members included naturalist Norman Wallace Lermond of Warren, artist Charles L. Fox of Portland, and writer George Allan England of Woodstock, each of whom ran for governor as Socialist Party nominees.

== 1900-1916 ==
=== 1916 ===
At its 1916 convention in Portland, the Socialist Party nominated James F. Carey of Surry for United States Senate, Frank H. Maxfield of Portland for governor, and Melville A. Floyd also of Portland for state auditor. Carey had previously served in the Massachusetts House of Representatives from 1899 to 1903. The party's platform included equal suffrage, public insurance, pensions for mothers and elders, a minimum wage, abolition of the U.S. Senate, equalization of funding for schools, and conservation of water power. In the September election, Carey finished in third place with 1,520 votes (1%). The party's presidential nominee, Allan L. Benson, received 2,177 votes (1.6%).

== 2016-18 ==
In January 2016, former Green Independent Party candidates Seth Baker and Tom MacMillan announced their intention to break with the Greens and to form a chapter of the Socialist Party. In August of that year, Socialist Party USA members established a local in Southern Maine. In April 2017, SPUSA established a second local in Maine, this one based in Eastern Maine. In July 2017, the two locals held a convention in Augusta and formed a statewide party.

In the 2018 elections, the party nominated Maia Dendinger for Maine Senate in the fifth district. Dendinger drew 1,124 votes, or 7.5%. The winner of the race was incumbent Democrat Jim Dill. As of 2019, the party was no longer listed on the Socialist Party's directory of local organizations and its website had gone inactive.

== Presidential nominee results ==
In 1956, Darlington Hoopes ran as the final nominee of the Socialist Party of America but was not on the Maine ballot. In 1976, following a split in the Socialist Party, Socialist Party USA began running independent candidates with the Socialist Party label. However, no SPUSA presidential nominee appeared on the ballot in Maine between 1976 and 2016.

Year	Nominee	Total votes	Percent	Notes
1900	Eugene V. Debs	878	0.83%	Social Democratic Party of America nominee
1904	Eugene V. Debs	2,102	2.17%	
1908	Eugene V. Debs	1,758	1.65%	
1912	Eugene V. Debs	2,514	1.96%	
1916	Allan L. Benson	2,177	1.60%	
1920	Eugene V. Debs	2,214	1.14%	
1924	Robert M. La Follette	11,382	5.92%	Dual endorsed Progressive Party nominee
1928	Norman Thomas	1,068	0.40%	
1932	Norman Thomas	2,489	0.83%	
1936	Norman Thomas	783	0.26%	
1940	Norman Thomas			Not on ballot
1944	Norman Thomas			Not on ballot
1948	Norman Thomas	548	0.21%	
1952	Darlington Hoopes	138	0.03%	
2020	Howie Hawkins	8,230	1.00%	Also nominated by Green Party of the United States

== Other reading ==
- Lermond, Norman W., and Scott M. Martin. Autobiography of Norman Wallace Lermond, Maine's Naturalist-Socialist. Humboldt Field Research Institute, Steuben, Me, 2004.
- Scontras, Charles A., and University of Maine. Bureau of Labor Education. The Socialist Alternative: Utopian Experiments and the Socialist Party of Maine, 1895-1914. The Bureau of Labor Education, University of Maine, Orono, Me, 1985.
- Special Collections, Raymond H. Fogler Library, University of Maine. Wight (Clement P.) Socialist Party of Maine Papers, 1896–1915. DigitalCommons@UMaine, 2015.
