= George Tate (Russian Navy officer) =

English naval officer in the Russian service (1745–1821)

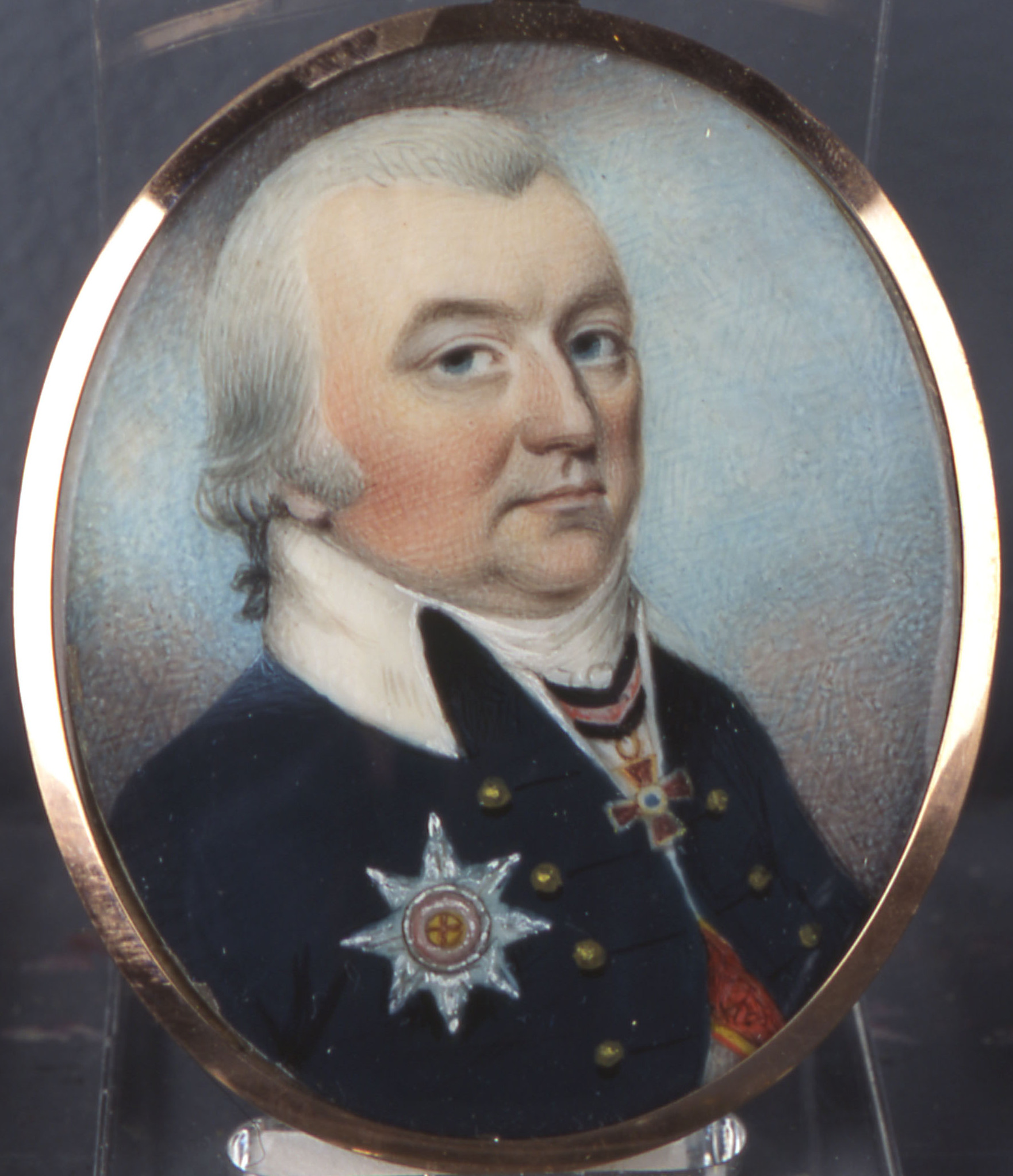
- Portrait miniature (c. 1795)
- Born: 14 June 1746; London, England
- Died: 17 February 1821 (aged 74); St. Petersburg, Russia
- Relatives: George Tate (father)
- Military career
- Allegiance: Russian Empire
- Branch: Imperial Navy
- Rank: Admiral
- Conflicts: Russo-Turkish War; Siege of Ismail
- Awards: Order of St. Waldemar; Order of St. Alexander Nevsky; Order of St. John

George Tate (1745–1821) was an English admiral in the Russian Navy.

== Family origins ==
George Tate was born near London on 14 June 1746, although some sources give the earlier date of 19 June 1745. He was the third son of George Tate (1700–1794) by his wife, Mary (died 1770). He belonged to a Northamptonshire family, three members of which had been lord mayors of London—in 1473, 1488, 1496 and 1513. His father, George Tate, who served for some time in the Russian Navy, and was afterwards settled in London as an agent for the Russian Admiralty, emigrated to North America about 1754, and settled at Falmouth, in the Province of Massachusetts Bay, where he kept up a trade connection with Russia, and where he died at the age of ninety-four in 1794. His sons seem to have been all brought up to the sea.

== Naval career ==
George, the third son, entered the Russian Navy, and in 1770 was made a lieutenant, probably in the fleet under John Elphinstone. He is said to have distinguished himself in several engagements against the Turks and the Swedes. At the capture of Ismail in December 1790 he was wounded. He was promoted to be rear-admiral and presented with a miniature of the empress Catharine II, set in diamonds. In 1795 he had a command in the squadron of twelve ships of the line sent, under Vice-admiral Hanikoff, to co-operate with the English; though they are said to have been in such a bad state that the English "derived no other advantage from them than the honour of repairing them and supplying their wants". After a short experience of them, they were sent home as worse than useless. In 1796 and again in 1799 as vice-admiral, Tate commanded a squadron in the North Sea. He was made admiral and senator by Alexander I, and received the orders of St. Waldemar, Alexander Nevsky, and St. John.

== Death and personal ==
He died suddenly, unmarried, at St. Petersburg on 17 February 1821. To the last he kept up a correspondence with his family in the United States, and occasionally visited them. He is described as of middle height, stout build, dark complexion. His portrait and letters, with others of his papers, later came into the possession of his grand-niece, Eliza Ingraham, and her family of Portland, Maine.

== Sources ==
- Brenton, Edward Pelham (1823). The Naval History of Great Britain, from the Year MDCCLXXXIII to MDCCCXXII. Vol. 2. London: C. Rice. pp. 98–99.
- Camperdown, 3rd Earl of (1898). Admiral Duncan. London: Longmans, Green, and Co. pp. 43, 66; at Yarmouth, 312; at the Texel, 319, 320.
- Warner, Richard H. (2004). "Tate, George (1746–1821), naval officer in the Russian service". Oxford Dictionary of National Biography. Oxford University Press. Retrieved 12 September 2022.
- Willis, William (1865). The History of Portland, from 1632 to 1864. 2nd ed. Portland, ME: Bailey & Noyes. pp. 840–842.
- The Gentleman's Magazine. Vol. 91, Part 1. London: John Nichols and Son. January–June 1821. p. 378.

Attribution:

- This article incorporates text from a publication now in the public domain: Laughton, John Knox (1898). "Tate, George (1745-1821)". In Lee, Sidney (ed.). Dictionary of National Biography. Vol. 55. London: Smith, Elder & Co. p. 377.
