= When Religion Becomes Evil =

Book by Charles Kimball

- Author: Kimball, Charles
- Language: English
- Subject: Religion
- Genre: Science
- Publisher: HarperCollins Canada
- Publication date: 2002
- Publication place: United Kingdom
- Media type: Hardcover
- ISBN: 0-06-055610-2
- OCLC: 49977272

When Religion Becomes Evil is a book by Baptist minister Charles Kimball, published in 2002. Kimball is a professor in the Department of Religion at Wake Forest University and also an adjunct professor in the Wake Forest Divinity School. In 2008, he became director of Religious Studies at the University of Oklahoma. Kimball specialises in Islamic Studies.

When Religion Becomes Evil examines the role of religion in the world and when it defects from its original purpose. While he claims that religion is basically necessary and positive, he ascribes several warning signs for when religions can become dangerous.

Kimball lists five warning signs of a religion becoming evil. These are also his main chapter titles and appear on the back cover of the book.

- Absolute Truth Claims
- Blind Obedience
- Establishing the "Ideal" Time
- The End Justifies Any Means
- Declaring Holy War

Using his five warning signs, Kimball analyzes what religion is, why he believes we need it, and how we can fix something when it goes wrong.

== Reviews ==
- Stephen Duffy (2003). "Review of When Religion Becomes Evil by Charles Kimball". Ecumenical Trends. 32: 77–79.
