= Norman Wallace Lermond =

American naturalist and socialist activist

Norman Wallace Lermond (July 27, 1861 – Spring 1944) was an American naturalist and socialist activist. Lermond helped found the People's Party (the so-called "Populists") in Maine. and in 1892, Lermond ran for the U.S. Congress from Maine's 2nd congressional district for the Populists, finishing in third place with 3.63% of the vote. In 1900, Lermond ran for Governor of Maine, becoming the first socialist candidate for governor in Maine history. He lost to Republican John Fremont Hill.

== Biography ==
Lermond was born on July 27, 1861, in Warren, Maine, to Omar W. and Rebecca (Todd) Lermond. His family moved to Boston, Massachusetts, in 1872 and he was sent to a religious boarding school in Hartford, Connecticut. He later attended Dudley Grammar School in Roxbury and English High School of Boston. After his schooling he worked in the Bartlett book store and then worked a year for a trade journal The Boston Telegram in New York. He worked for the New York and New England Railroad for several years as an accountant.

He was noted to be a farmer and helped found the Thomaston Farmers' Exchange in 1880 and helped organize the New England Milk Association.

Lermond started to write an autobiography but died before it was completed. His papers were found with the Department of Mollusks of Harvard University's Museum of Comparative Zoology and was published with annotations.

Lermond was buried, at his request, in a pine box under a large pine tree in an unmarked grave at the entrance to his arboretum in Maine.

== Socialist ==
Lermond was notable as a founder of the Socialist Party of Maine in the 1890s. He envisioned "local unions" (communities) establishing the first one at what became the Knox Arboretum. He helped create the Brotherhood of the Co-operative Commonwealth and the Equality Colony in the state of Washington with the intent of socialism taking over the state and then the country. According to the Maine Historical Society he called his local union Utopia Park. He was inspired by Edward Bellamy's Equality and in the five months he spent in Edison, Washington helping establish the Equality Colony, he helped found the socialist newspaper Equality.

== Naturalist ==
Lermond remained an amateur naturalist but was noted as being the "...foremost naturalist in New England and labored tirelessly to interest and organize both professionals and amateurs alike to study the natural history of Maine." In addition to his observations around Boston and Maine, "He studied flora and fauna of the Pacific Coast, and in the states of Arkansas and Tennessee, and dredged for shells off the coast of Florida. He studied nature in the Bahamas and Cuba, and camped in the Everglades for a period of three weeks with a party of eminent scientists doing research work. For several months at two different times, he was assistant in the Department of Mollusks at Harvard College."

=== The Knox Arboretum, Knox Academy of Arts and Sciences, and Maine Naturalist ===
Lermond organized and directed the Knox Academy of Arts and Sciences, established in 1913, and established the Knox Arboretum which was roughly sixty acres of land with approximately 3500' of tidal frontage and a large brick house at the junction the St. George and Oyster Rivers in Warren, Maine. The arboretum also housed a library and herbarium. Also a Charles Creighten's collection of birds, local Indian relics, butterflies, minnows, and tourmaline. The property was offered to the State of Maine and was accepted at first and funded but in 1937 the eighty-eighth state legislature declined acceptance of the deed to the Knox Arboretum writing that the arboretum "...is one of the outstanding attractions in the state..." but would cause expenses at a time the citizens demanded no unnecessary expenses and there was a question about the quality of the title.

The Knox Academy has such members as John Harvey Lovell, and Marie Curie became an honorary Life Member on June 18, 1921.

Lermond founded and edited the Knox Academy's journal, The Maine Naturalist. Upon his death in 1944 the arboretum and Knox Academy ended.

=== American Malacological Union ===
Lermond was the founder of the American Malacological Union in 1931. Lermond initially called the group the American Association of Conchologists but that name had been used previously by a group started by John Campbell of Philadelphia in 1890. The name was changed at the first meeting April 1931 in Philadelphia. Today the group is the American Malacological Society.

In his study of mollusks, Lermond collect enough shells to fill "100 cases" and was estimated by the Smithsonian Institution in 1940s to be valued at $50,000. One type was a new discovery and was named in honor of him, Caecum lermondi but was found to have been previously identified as Meioceras nitidum. The Lermond shell collection was acquired by Colby College in Waterville, Maine to be put on display, but then went to the Museum of Comparative Zoology (Harvard University) and the Delaware Museum of Natural History.

== Publications ==
- Editor, Shells of Maine: a catalogue of the land, fresh-water and marine Mollusca of Maine. Report Commissioner of Agriculture, Augusta, Maine. 1908. 46 pp.
- Additions to the list of Maine Mollusca. Nautilus 28(2), 1914. 18-20.
