= Louise Brown Verrill =

American composer and pianist

Louise Shurtleff Brown Verrill (23 March 1870 – 17 February 1948) was an American composer and pianist. Verrill was born in Portland, Maine to Lewis F. and Mary Alice Abbott Brown. She studied piano and composition in Berlin and Dresden, then married Harry Mighels Verrill in 1895. They had five children. In 1897 she was elected to the National Society of the Colonial Dames of America.

Verrill's music was published by Louis H. Ross & Co. Her works include:

== Piano ==
- Alone
- Birch Tree
- Chaconne
- Du bist wie eine Blume
- Exultation
- Four Moods of a Gnome
- Ghosts on Parade
- It Happened in Spain
- It is Spring
- Jennie Kissed Me
- Lonely Pine
- March of the Patriot
- Reverie
- Rumpelstiltskin
- Slumber Song
- Tenderness
- Tone Pictures
- Tone Poem
- Walhalla
- Waltz
- When Shadows Fall
- Yellow Moon

== Vocal ==
- "Pleasant Dreams"
- Winter Joy (solo and chorus)
- "You Came Like the Dawn" (music by Ivan McScod; text by Louise Brown Verrill)
