= George Tate (Royal Navy officer) =

British sea captain (1700–1794)

Captain George Tate
- Born: 20 April 1700; England
- Died: 20 August 1794 (aged 94); Falmouth, District of Maine, U.S.
- Resting place: Stroudwater Burying Ground, Portland, Maine, U.S.

George Tate (20 April 1700 – 20 August 1794) was an 18th-century British sea captain. He came to prominence after emigrating to Falmouth, Province of Massachusetts Bay (today's Portland, Maine). He was senior mast agent for George II in the province of Massachusetts Bay between 1751 and 1755. His former home in Portland, now known as the Tate House, is a National Historic Landmark.

== Life and career ==
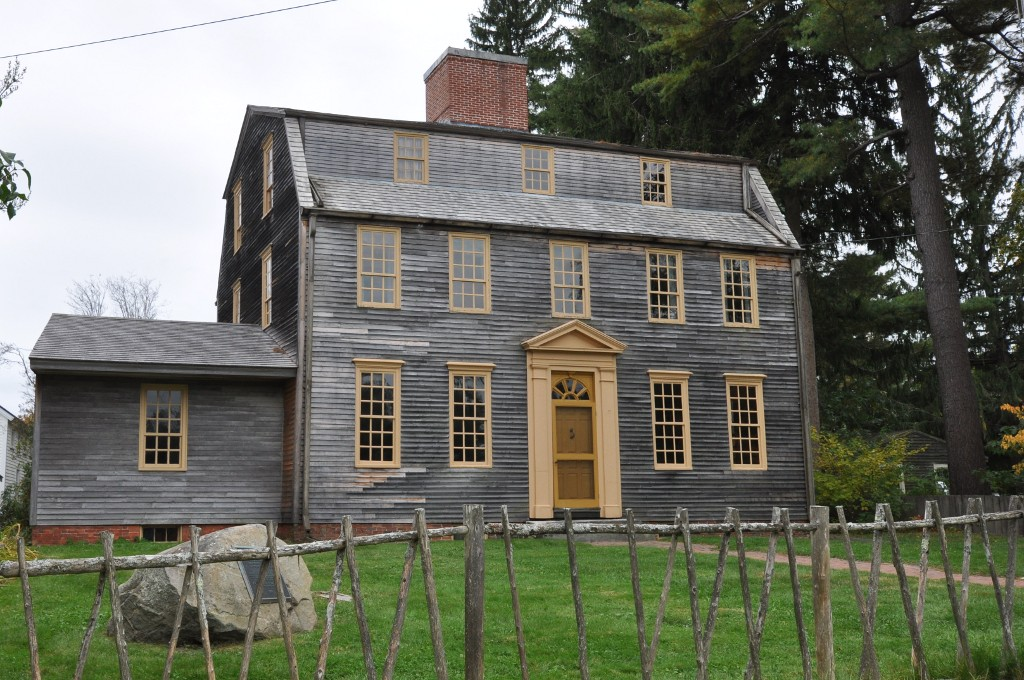
The Tate House, pictured in 2013, 258 years after it was built

Tate was born in 1700. His early career was spent captaining masted vessels carrying timber from the Baltic Sea to the River Thames in London. He was a seaman on the first frigate built in Russia, during the reign of Peter the Great.

He married Mary Tate, with whom he had five children—Samuel, William, George Jr, Mary and Robert—before emigrating to colonial America from their home in Rotherhithe, south-east London. Samuel became a ship captain in the Royal Navy, George Jr served in the Russian Navy, while the younger Mary died in 1749, before their departure, around the age of 1. After arriving in Falmouth, Province of Massachusetts Bay, he built a wharf and a warehouse, where the family lived until their home, today's Tate House, was completed in the Stroudwater neighborhood of Portland in 1755.

Tate lost his authority at the outbreak of the American Revolutionary War in 1775.

== Death ==
Tate died in 1794, aged 94. He had survived his wife by 24 years, and was interred beside her and three of their children at Stroudwater Burying Ground. George Jr and William were interred in Portland's Evergreen Cemetery after their deaths in 1821 and 1833, respectively.
