= Stroudwater River =

Coordinates: 43°39′23″N 70°18′32″W

Location
- Country: United States

Physical characteristics
- Source
  - elevation: 200 ft (61 m)
- Mouth
  - elevation: 0 ft (0 m)
- Length: 15 mi (24 km)

The Stroudwater River is a 15.2-mile-long (24.5 km) river located mostly in Cumberland County, Maine. The river begins as a small stream at Duck Pond in Buxton and grows as it flows through Buxton, Gorham, Westbrook, and finally Portland before emptying into the Fore River at Stroudwater falls in Portland's Stroudwater neighborhood. Several smaller streams flow into the river in Buxton and Gorham, including Deering Brook, Gully Brook, Fogg Brook and Silver Brook.

The Fore River Sanctuary, a nature preserve with footpaths and wooden bridges over wetlands, is located near the confluence of the Stroudwater and Fore rivers.
