= Michelle Lilienthal =

American distance runner (born 1982)

Personal information
- Born: April 15, 1982 (age 44) Iowa City, Iowa, U.S.

Sport
- Country: United States
- Events: Marathon, half marathon, 10km
- College team: University of Wisconsin
- Team: Dirigo RC

Achievements and titles
- Personal bests: Marathon: 2:34:50; Half Marathon: 1:11:45; 10 km: 33:39

Michelle Lilienthal (born 15 April 1982) is an American distance runner who specializes in the marathon. She competed collegiately in cross country and track for the University of Wisconsin. After graduating, she qualified for four consecutive U.S. Olympic Trials marathons (2008, 2012, 2016, and 2020).

== Early life ==
Lilienthal grew up in Iowa City, Iowa, and graduated from Iowa City High School in 2000. She did not start running until her sophomore year but achieved immediate success, winning seven Iowa state championships in cross country and track over her high school career. She also qualified for the 1999 Foot Locker National Cross Country Championship and finished 6th overall.

At the University of Wisconsin, Lilienthal was an All-Big 10 honoree and competed for the Badgers at multiple NCAA Championships. She graduated in 2004 with a double major in Communications and Spanish.

== Career ==
=== 2005 - 2013 ===
After graduating from college, Lilienthal moved to Philadelphia and placed third in the 2005 Philadelphia Marathon. The following spring, she clocked a 2:40:23 time at the 2006 Boston Marathon, which placed her second among American women and 16th overall.

At the 2006 Twin Cities Marathon, Lilienthal dropped her time even further to 2:35:51, which qualified her for the 2008 U.S. Olympic Trials Marathon.

In 2007 while living in Minneapolis and representing Minnesota Distance Elite, Lilienthal placed third at the US Half Marathon Championships in Houston with a time of 1:12:46.

At the 2008 US Olympic Trials in Boston, Lilienthal placed 85th of 148 women at 2:48:46.

She finished 22nd at the 2012 Olympic Trials, in 2:37:03.

She finished 3rd at the US Half Marathon Championships in 1:11:45 which qualified her to represent the US at the 2012 World Half Marathon Championships in Bulgaria.

Lilienthal returned to action at the 2013 Twin Cities Marathon, placing fourth at 2:34:50, her personal best. The performance also qualified her for the 2016 U.S. Olympic Trials Marathon in Los Angeles.

=== 2014–present ===
She relocated to Portland, Maine, in 2014 and won the Maine Women's division of the Beach to Beacon 10K. Her time of 33:39 is the fastest a Maine woman has ever run in the race. She repeated as Maine Champion in 2016 and 2018.

In the 2016 U.S. Olympic Trials Marathon, Lilienthal was unable to finish on a hot and sunny day in Los Angeles. Over 25% of the women's field dropped out.

Lilienthal placed 29th at the 2017 Chicago Marathon in a time of 2:44:05, which qualified her for the 2020 United States Olympic Trials (marathon) in Atlanta.

In the fall of 2019, Lilienthal gave birth to a son. She ran 65 to 75 miles per week into her third trimester of pregnancy.

Lilienthal resumed training after her son was born, but did not have enough time to regain her usual fitness. She competed in the 2020 US Olympic Trials Marathon in February 2020, but dropped out near halfway.

== Personal life ==
Lilienthal lives in Portland, Maine, with her husband and two sons, and works as a consultant at Apple Inc. She was previously married to Minnesota politician Jacob Frey.
