= Sheri Piers =

American distance runner (born 1971)

Personal information
- Born: 15 May 1971 (age 55) Westbrook, Maine, U.S.

Sport
- Country: United States
- Event(s): Marathon, half marathon
- College team: Saint Joseph's College of Maine
- Team: Dirigo RC

Achievements and titles
- Personal best(s): Marathon: 2:36:59; Half Marathon: 1:14:27; 10 km: 34:17

Sheri Piers is an American distance runner who specializes in the marathon. She won multiple USA Masters Marathon Championships in her 40s, and placed in the top 25 in the U.S. Olympic Trials marathon in 2008 and 2012.

== Early life ==
Piers grew up in Westbrook, Maine and attended Westbrook High School. She was the Maine state champion in cross country her junior year, while also playing basketball for Westbrook. After high school, she opted to play basketball rather than run competitively at nearby Saint Joseph’s College of Maine in Standish.

== Career ==
=== 2005 - 2012 ===
Piers graduated from college in 1993, but didn’t begin running competitively until 2005 at age 34, after the birth of her third daughter. In 2007, she ran 2:45:37 at the Philadelphia Marathon, which qualified her for the 2008 U.S. Olympic Trials Marathon.

At the Olympic Trials in Boston, Piers ran a time of 2:38:46 to place 16th of 148 women. In 2009, she returned to the same course and placed 10th in the Boston Marathon with a time of 2:37:04. In the fall of 2009, she placed 10th of 10,171 runners in the New York City Half Marathon.

Piers placed 8th at the 2011 Twin Cities Marathon with a time of 2:37:42, which was the first of her Masters National Championship wins at Twin Cities. In Houston at the 2012 US Olympic Trials Marathon, Piers clocked a time of 2:37:09 to place 24th of 185 women. Only three months later, Piers was the top American and 10th overall at the 2012 Boston Marathon.

Piers was a dominant force in road races in her home state of Maine from 2009 to 2012. She won the Maine Women’s division of the Beach to Beacon 10K in 2009, 2011, and 2012. Piers also won the Mid Winter Classic six times and holds the course record of 57:25, set in 2013. The previous record of 57:32 had stood for 15 years and was set by U.S. Olympian Lynn Jennings.

=== 2013 - Present ===
Piers notched 2016 Olympic Trials qualifying times in consecutive years at the Twin Cities Marathon in 2013 and 2014, winning American Masters titles in the process. She was inducted into the Maine Running Hall of Fame in 2014.

In the 2016 U.S. Olympic Trials Marathon in Los Angeles, Piers placed 116th of 205 women in hot, sunny weather. She consistently ran between 90 and 130 miles per week over a decade, with only a few days off from running each year. In a 2020 interview, Piers said that she eats whatever she wants during training, including daily sweets including Skittles, gummy bears, and Starburst. She prefers diet soda in the mornings over coffee.

== Personal ==
Piers lives in Falmouth, Maine with her husband, Wayne, and works as the medical director for her alma mater, Saint Joseph's College of Maine. They have three children and their youngest daughter, Karley, runs collegiately for Florida Gulf Coast University in Fort Myers.
