= Julia Kirtland =

American distance runner (born 1965)

Personal information
- Born: 15 March 1965 (age 61) Auburn, New York, United States

Sport
- Country: United States
- Event: Marathon
- College team: Macalester College

Achievements and titles
- Personal best(s): Marathon: 2:37:46; 10 km: 34:56

Julia Kirtland (born 15 March 1965) is a former American distance runner who specialized in the marathon. She won the 1997 USA Marathon Championship, and also placed in the top 25 at the 1996 and 2000 U.S. Olympic Trials marathon.

== Early life ==
Kirtland grew up in Auburn, New York before relocating to Northfield, Massachusetts. There she attended high school at Northfield Mount Hermon, competing in field hockey and cross country.

Kirtland continued her running career at Macalester College in Saint Paul, Minnesota. She became one of the most decorated runners in the history of NCAA Division III, winning eight individual NCAA Championships and earning 16 NCAA All-American awards. She graduated in 1987 and was inducted into the Macalester Athletics Hall of Fame in 1997.

== Career ==
Kirtland made the jump up to the marathon distance in 1994, running an Olympic Trials qualifying time at the Twin Cities Marathon. In the 1996 U.S. Olympic Trials Marathon in South Carolina, Kirtland placed 14th of 160 women in a time of 2:37:53. She finished one spot behind 1984 Olympic Champion and fellow Maine resident, Joan Benoit.

The following year, Kirtland returned to the Twin Cities and won the 1997 USA Marathon Championship in a time of 2:37:46. Kirtland represented the United States at the 1997 World Championships in Athens, Greece, placing 36th in the marathon.

A resident of Maine since the early 1990s, Kirtland was a dominant force in Maine road races. She won the Maine Women's division of the Beach to Beacon 10K in 1998, 1999, and 2000, the first three years of the event's existence.

At the 1999 Boston Marathon, Kirtland placed 13th in a time of 2:39:45, which qualified her for the 2000 U.S. Olympic Trials Marathon. At the Trials, Kirtland finished 23rd of 170 women in a time of 2:45:28.

Kirtland was inducted into the Maine Running Hall of Fame in 2008.

In 2013, Kirtland was inducted into the NCAA Division III Track and Field Hall of Fame.

== Personal ==
Kirtland lives in Portland, Maine and owns a sports massage clinic.
