= Beach to Beacon 10K =

American race

- Date: First Saturday in August
- Location: Cape Elizabeth, Maine
- Event type: Road
- Distance: 10 km 6.2 miles (10.0 km)
- Primary sponsor: TD Bank
- Established: 1998 (28 years ago)
- Course records: 27:26 (men); 30:41 (women)
- Participants: 7,080 finishers (2026)

The TD Beach to Beacon 10K is a 10-kilometer (6.2 mi) road running event that takes place along the coastline of Cape Elizabeth, Maine. It begins at Crescent Beach State Park and ends at the Portland Head Light in Fort Williams Park. One of the most competitive 10K road races in the United States, it was founded in 1998 by U.S. women's marathon runner Joan Benoit Samuelson, who in 1984, won the first ever women's Olympic marathon. The race is managed by DMSE, Inc. whose president, Dave McGillivray, directs the Boston Marathon and more than 30 other races each year. The current President of the race is healthcare executive, Laurie Mitchell.

== History ==
Starting out as mainly a local race, world-class international athletes now participate in the annual event, including Catherine Ndereba, Meb Keflezighi, Robert Kipkoech Cheruiyot, Hellen Obiri, and Edna Kiplagat. Top American runners to compete in recent years include Conner Mantz, Clayton Young, Ryan Hall, Joe Klecker, Ben True, Sara Hall, Deena Kastor, Fiona O'Keeffe, Elise Cranny and Keira D'Amato. In 1998, the first year the event was held, over 3000 runners participated in the race. The 2009 race event registration filled in just 1 hour 45 minutes.

A then-record 5,668 runners participated in the event in 2010, which saw Lineth Chepkurui break the women's course record by almost half a minute. This mark was again improved in 2017 by Mary Keitany, as she clocked a time of 30:41, which remains the women's record as of 2025. Conner Mantz ran 27:26 in the 2025 event to break the previous record of 27:27 set by Gilbert Okari in 2003. Mantz is one of only two Americans to ever win the race, the other being Maine native Ben True (2016).

The 2020 edition of the race was cancelled due to the coronavirus pandemic, with all registrants automatically receiving full refunds and the option to register early for the 2021 edition. Ultimately the 2021 event was also cancelled and a virtual competition was held instead. The race returned in 2022 with a COVID vaccination requirement. This requirement was subsequently dropped in 2023, as participation returned to pre-pandemic levels. (Note: The 2020 edition of the race sold out in 17 minutes.)

== Prize Money ==
Awarding over $90,000 in prize money, the TD Beach to Beacon 10K is one of the most lucrative road races in the U.S. shorter than the marathon distance. Overall male and female winners earn $10,000, while the top American finisher wins $5,000. Top Master (40+) and Senior (50+) runners also win prize money. Additionally, the race features a Maine resident division. The male and female winners receive $1,000 and are regarded as the Maine road racing champions for the year.

== Beneficiary ==
Each year, a Maine non-profit organization serving youths is awarded the designation of race beneficiary. Title sponsor TD Bank donates $30,000 to the beneficiary, while additional fundraising opportunities are available during runner registration or through other event sponsors. Publicity generated from the non-profit's association with the Beach to Beacon 10K often results in total fundraising surpassing $100,000.

== Overall winners ==
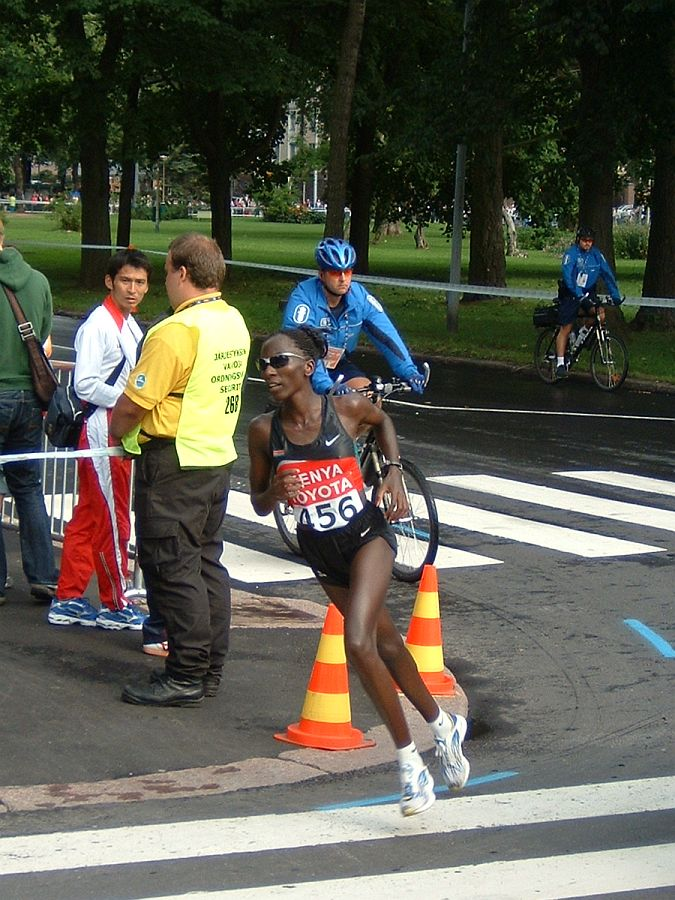
Catherine Ndereba has won the women's race on five occasions.

Key: Course record

Edition	Year	Men's winner	Time (m:s)	Women's winner	Time (m:s)
1st	1998	Johannes Mabitle (RSA)	28:18	Catherine Ndereba (KEN)	32:15
2nd	1999	Khalid Khannouchi (MAR)	27:48	Catherine Ndereba (KEN)	32:05
3rd	2000	Joseph Kimani (KEN)	28:07	Catherine Ndereba (KEN)	32:19
4th	2001	Evans Rutto (KEN)	28:30	Catherine Ndereba (KEN)	31:34
5th	2002	James Koskei (KEN)	28:11	Adriana Fernández (MEX)	31:56
6th	2003	Gilbert Okari (KEN)	27:27.5	Catherine Ndereba (KEN)	31:52.5
7th	2004	Gilbert Okari (KEN)	27:35.0	Susan Chepkemei (KEN)	31:35.1
8th	2005	Gilbert Okari (KEN)	27:38.7	Lornah Kiplagat (NED)	31:35.0
9th	2006	Thomas Nyariki (KEN)	27:47.5	Alevtina Ivanova (RUS)	31:25.7
10th	2007	Duncan Kibet (KEN)	27:51.7	Luminița Talpoș (ROM)	32:20.3
11th	2008	Edward Muge Kiprotich (KEN)	27:52.4	Edith Masai (KEN)	31:55.6
12th	2009	Edward Muge Kiprotich (KEN)	28:04.5	Irene Limika (KEN)	32:05.8
13th	2010	Gebregziabher Gebremariam (ETH)	27:40.4	Lineth Chepkurui (KEN)	30:59.4
14th	2011	Micah Kogo (KEN)	27:48	Aheza Kiros (ETH)	32:09
15th	2012	Stanley Biwott (KEN)	28:00	Margaret Wangari Muriuki (KEN)	31:52
16th	2013	Micah Kogo (KEN)	28:04	Joyce Chepkirui (KEN)	31:24
17th	2014	Bedan Karoki (KEN)	27:37.0	Gemma Steel (UK)	31:26.7
18th	2015	Stephen Kosgei Kibet (KEN)	28:28.2	Wude Ayalew (ETH)	31:55.5
19th	2016	Ben True (USA)	28:16.3	Mary Keitany (KEN)	30:44
20th	2017	Stephen Kosgei Kibet (KEN)	27:55	Mary Keitany (KEN)	30:41
21st	2018	Jake Robertson (NZL)	27:37	Sandrafelis Chebet Tuei (KEN)	31:21
22nd	2019	Alex Korio (KEN)	27:34	Joyciline Jepkosgei (KEN)	31:05
	2020	cancelled due to coronavirus pandemic			
	2021	cancelled due to coronavirus pandemic			
24th	2022	Mathew Kimeli (KEN)	28:39	Fantaye Belayneh (ETH)	32:07
25th	2023	Addisu Yihune (ETH)	27:56	Hellen Obiri (KEN)	31:37
26th	2024	Tadese Worku (ETH)	28:12	Edna Kiplagat (KEN)	32:17
27th	2025	Conner Mantz (USA)	27:26	Isobel Batt-Doyle (AUS)	31:25
28th	2026	Habtom Samuel (ERI)	27:40	Pamela Kosgei (KEN)	31:50

== Maine winners ==
Edition	Year	Men's winner	Time (m:s)	Women's winner	Time (m:s)
1st	1998	Bob Winn	30:52	Julia Kirtland	34:56
2nd	1999	Bob Winn	31:11	Julia Kirtland	35:07
3rd	2000	Todd Coffin	31:36	Julia Kirtland	35:35
4th	2001	Andy Spaulding	31:29	Christine Snow-Reaser	36:13
5th	2002	Andy Spaulding	31:26	Christine Snow-Reaser	36:30
6th	2003	Eric Giddings	31:18	Maggie Hanson	35:47
7th	2004	Ethan Hemphill	31:35	Susannah Beck	35:22
8th	2005	Eric Giddings	30:34	Emily Levan	35:52
9th	2006	Donny Drake	31:16	Emily Levan	35:40
10th	2007	Ayalew Taye	30:47	Emily Levan	35:01
11th	2008	Ben True	31:02	Kristin Barry	34:37
12th	2009	Ben True	**29:10**	Sheri Piers	34:17
13th	2010	Pat Tarpy	29:28	Kristin Barry	34:35
14th	2011	Louis Luchini	30:36	Sheri Piers	35:11
15th	2012	Ethan Shaw	30:37	Sheri Piers	34:22
16th	2013	Riley Masters	30:19	Erica Jesseman	34:17
17th	2014	Will Geoghegan	29:53	Michelle Lilienthal	**33:39**
18th	2015	Ben Decker	32:49	Erica Jesseman	34:53
19th	2016	Jesse Orach	31:31	Michelle Lilienthal	34:53
20th	2017	Jesse Orach*	31:31	Emily Durgin	34:43
21st	2018	Ryan Smith	30:50	Michelle Lilienthal	36:16
22nd	2019	Dan Curts	29:26	Sofie Matson	36:01
24th	2022	Sam Mills	31:08	Aly Ursiny	36:17
25th	2023	Matt Rand	30:41	Ruth White	34:56
26th	2024	Luke Marsanskis	29:12	Veronica Graziano	35:51
27th	2025	Luke Marsanskis	29:27	Ruth White	34:51
28th	2026	Alec Troxell	29:15	Ruth White	34:05

- **Bold** denotes course record in the Maine division.
- Orach collapsed with 100 meters to go, but was helped to the finish line by fellow Mainer Rob Gomez.
