= Maine Marathon =

American race

- Date: First Sunday in October
- Location: Portland, Maine, United States
- Event type: Road
- Distance: Marathon
- Established: 1992
- Course records: 2:19:19 (M); 2:39:38 (F)
- Website: www.mainemarathon.com

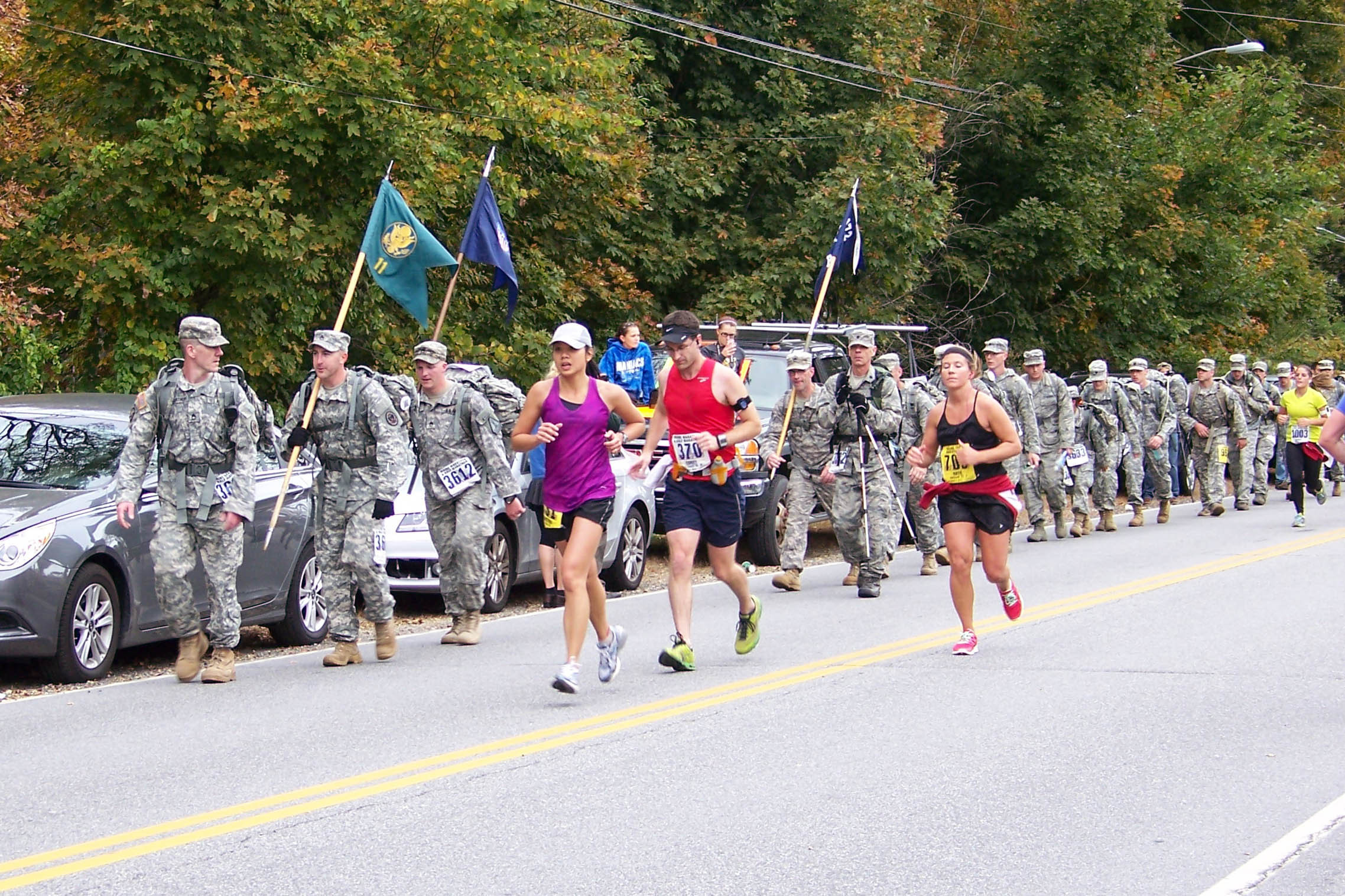
Runners and marchers in 2013

The Maine Community Bank Maine Marathon, formerly known as the Casco Bay Marathon, is a series of USATF-certified road running events held each October in Portland, Maine that includes a full marathon, a half marathon, and a marathon relay. The course is an out-and-back that starts and finishes along the Back Cove of Portland, going up the coast to Yarmouth and back. The terrain is mostly rolling hills and passes through the towns of Falmouth and Cumberland before the turnaround point in Yarmouth.

== History ==
From 1978 through 1987, the event was known as the Casco Bay Marathon.

The 2012 race was held on Sept. 30, and the 2013 event was held on Oct. 6.

The 2020 in-person edition of the race was cancelled due to the coronavirus pandemic, with all registrants given the option of running the race virtually (and obtaining a partial refund), transferring their entry to 2021, or obtaining a full refund.

Beginning in 2024, the Maine Marathon became one of the first road races to award to non-binary athletes the same prize money as the top male and female runners.

The 2025 event surpassed 5,000 registrations, making it the largest marathon in Maine, and the second largest road race of any distance in the state after the Beach to Beacon 10K.

== Winners ==
=== 2005-Present ===
Year	Male	City/State	Time	Female	City/State	Time
2005	Matt Frongillo	Bar Harbor, ME	2:41:34	Brennan Liming	Apex, NC	3:11:22
2006	Byrne Decker	Yarmouth, ME	2:30:25	Dana Parrot	Tampa, FL	2:53:54
2007	Dan Vassallo	Wilmington, MA	2:26:54	Stephanie Crawford	Framingham, MA	3:01:16
2008	Art Siemers	Golden, CO	2:28:24	Heather Pagano	Portland, ME	3:06:54
2009	Jeremy Adler	New York, NY	2:38:57	Heather Goodfellow	Halifax, Nova Scotia	2:59:16
2010	Jeremy Adler	New York, NY	2:36:35	Jennifer Jorgensen	Glastonbury, CT	3:00:55
2011	Evan Graves	Caribou, ME	2:36:53	Stephanie Crawford	Dover, NH	3:07:08
2012	Dan Vassallo	Wilmington, MA	2:21:12	Eliza Tibbets	Old Town, ME	3:03:50
2013	Rob Gomez	Saco, ME	2:24:22	Leah Frost	Round Pond, ME	3:00:52
2014	Moninda Marube	Auburn, ME	2:29:56	Leah Frost	Glover, VT	2:51:53
2015	Evan Graves	Caribou, ME	2:34:59	Leah Frost	Glover, VT	2:47:34
2016	Spencer McElwain	Arundel, ME	2:31:36	Lauren Jackson	Augusta, NJ	3:06:11
2017	Andrew Van Hoogenstyn	New Haven, CT	2:28:58	Tracey Guerrette	St. Agatha, ME	2:43:47
2018	Moses Gitau	Mexico City, Mexico	2:27:37	Christine Hein	North Yarmouth, ME	2:54:49
2019	Abdulmenan Kasim	New York, NY	2:23:08	Erica Jesseman	Scarborough, ME	2:59:33
2020	cancelled due to coronavirus pandemic					
2021	Jacob Terry	Scarborough, ME	2:25:27	Abby Hamilton	Yarmouth, ME	2:39:38
2022	Ryan Eiler	Boston, MA	2:19:19	Lila Gaudrault	Cape Elizabeth, ME	2:52:17
2023	Brandon Talisesky	New York, NY	2:34:52	Emma Howe	Cambridge, MA	2:48:54
2024	Ryan Jara	Gorham, ME	2:21:09	Jenise Madden	Osterville, MA	2:53:32
2025	Sammy Mills	Portland, ME	2:25:52	Emma Howe	Cambridge, MA	2:45:24
