= Moses Porter =

US Army general (1756–1822)

Moses Porter (20 March 1756 – 14 April 1822) was a general in the United States Army during the War of 1812. His career lasted for over 40 years and he is one of the few officers who served in both the American Revolution and the War of 1812.

== Biography ==
Moses Porter was born on 20 March 1756 in Danvers, Massachusetts. He was the son of Benjamin Porter and Sarah Brown Porter. He joined the artillery during the Battle of Bunker Hill and went on to spend his entire career in the regular U.S. Army. Over the years, he served at several military posts, including Fort Detroit, Fort Mackinac, Fort Niagara, and New Orleans. During the War of 1812, he returned to Fort Niagara as a brevet brigadier general before later taking command at Fort Norfolk, Virginia.

=== Revolutionary War ===
On 1 January 1777 Porter was commissioned an ensign in the 6th Massachusetts Regiment (a.k.a. Nixon's Regiment) of the Continental Army, shortly before his 21st birthday. The regiment mostly served in the Hudson Highlands area of New York and participated in the Battles of Saratoga in 1777. He served in the 6th Massachusetts until he was deranged (i.e. involuntarily discharged due to reorganization) from the regiment on 1 March 1779. He was promoted to 2nd Lieutenant in the 3rd Continental Artillery Regiment, commanded by Colonel John Crane on 21 April 1779. He served with the 3rd Artillery, mostly in the Hudson Highlands area of New York, until it was consolidated with other artillery units on 17 June 1783 to form the Corps of Artillery. Porter was discharged from the Continental Army at the end of the Revolution on 3 November 1783.

Although he was eligible, for unknown reasons, Porter did not become an Original Member of the Society of the Cincinnati.

=== 1786 to 1812 ===
Porter was commissioned as a lieutenant in the newly formed United States Artillery Battalion on 20 October 1786. He served in the Northwest Indian War against the Miami Indians in the Northwest Territory (modern day Ohio) from 1790 to 1794. He was promoted to captain in command of a company of artillery on 4 November 1791 when a vacancy was created by the promotion of Captain Henry Burbeck to major following the death of Major William Ferguson in St. Clair's Defeat. (Note that companies of artillery were not called batteries until the American Civil War.) Porter's artillery company was originally formed in 1786 and was one of only four artillery companies in the U.S. Army prior to 1794. (The modern day 4th Battalion, 1st Field Artillery Regiment is credited with having Porter's company as its lineal ancestor.)

Porter's company was transferred to the 3rd Sublegion when that unit was formed in 1792, and saw service which culminated in the Battle of Fallen Timbers in 1794.

Porter and his company were transferred to the Corps of Artillerists and Engineers when that unit was formed on 1 May 1794. The Corps of Artillerists and Engineers was redesignated as the 1st Regiment of Artillerists and Engineers in 1799. He became a major in command of a battalion of four companies on 26 May 1800. He was retained as a major on 1 April 1802 when the Army was reduced and reorganized in accordance with the Military Peace Establishment Act.

=== War of 1812 ===
On 12 March 1812, shortly before the outbreak of the War of 1812, Porter was promoted to colonel and placed in command of the Light Artillery Regiment. In this capacity he served with distinction in the campaign in Upper Canada (modern day Ontario) and was brevetted (i.e. given an honorary promotion) to brigadier general on 10 September 1813 for "distinguished service in the campaign of 1813".

In 1814 Porter was sent to Norfolk, Virginia to take command of the defenses of that critical seaport. His headquarters was at Fort Norfolk. He served there until the conclusion of the war early in 1815.

=== Post war ===
After the war, most units of the Light Artillery Regiment were transferred to garrison coastal forts in New England. As he was one of the senior officers in the Army, Porter was appointed as a department commander. He commanded the 3rd Military Department (Southern New York and Northern New Jersey) from 31 July to 31 October 1816, he then commanded Army troops in Western New York from December 31, 1816, to March 1817. He then commanded the 4th Military Department (New Hampshire, Massachusetts, Rhode Island and Connecticut) from 30 April 1817 to 30 April 1818. His next assignment was as commander of the 4th Department (Pennsylvania, Delaware, Maryland, and Southern New Jersey) from May 31, 1818, to May 31, 1821.

On 1 June 1821, the Artillery units of the U.S. Army were reorganized into four artillery regiments and Porter was given command of the 1st Regiment of Artillery.

=== Death and burial ===
General Moses Porter died on 14 April 1822 at Cambridge, Massachusetts. He was 66 years old and had served over 42 years in uniform. He is buried in the Walnut Grove Cemetery in Danvers, Massachusetts.

General Porter's gravestone inscription reads as follows -

BRIG. GEN. MOSES PORTER, OF THE ARMY OF THE U.S.A.

An ardent and inflexible patriot, a brave and honorable soldier, an unassuming and virtuous citizen, a generous and faithful friend.

He served his country with distinguished ability and reputation, from the commencement of the Revolutionary war till he expired, full of years and honors, on the 14th of April, A.D., 1822 AE. 66.

== Battles ==
Although a definitive listing of the battles General Porter fought in has not been found, he probably participated in most or all of the following battles -

=== Revolution ===
- Battles of Saratoga (1777)
- Battle of Springfield (1780)

=== Northwest Indian War ===
- Harmar campaign (1790)
- St. Clair's Defeat (1791)
- Battle of Fallen Timbers (1794)

=== War of 1812 ===
- Battle of Queenston Heights, Oct. 13, 1812
- Capture of York (now Toronto), April 27, 1813
- Siege of Fort Meigs, Ohio, May 5, 1813
- Battle of Fort George, May 27, 1813
- Battle of Stony Creek, June 6, 1813
- Battle of Chrystler's Fields, Nov. 11, 1813
- Defense of Fort Oswego, New York, May 5 and 6, 1814
- Battle of Plattsburgh, New York, Sept. 11, 1814

== Dates of rank ==
- Ensign, 6th Massachusetts - 1 January 1777
- 2nd Lieutenant, 3rd Continental Artillery - 21 April 1779
- Discharged from Continental Army - 3 November 1783
- Lieutenant, US Artillery Battalion - 20 October 1786
- Captain, Artillery - 4 November 1791
- Major, Artillerists and Engineers - 26 May 1800
- Colonel, Light Artillery - 12 March 1812
- Brevet Brigadier General - 10 September 1813
