= Fort Preble =

Deactivated military fort in South Portland, Maine

- Part of Harbor Defenses of Portland
- South Portland, Maine
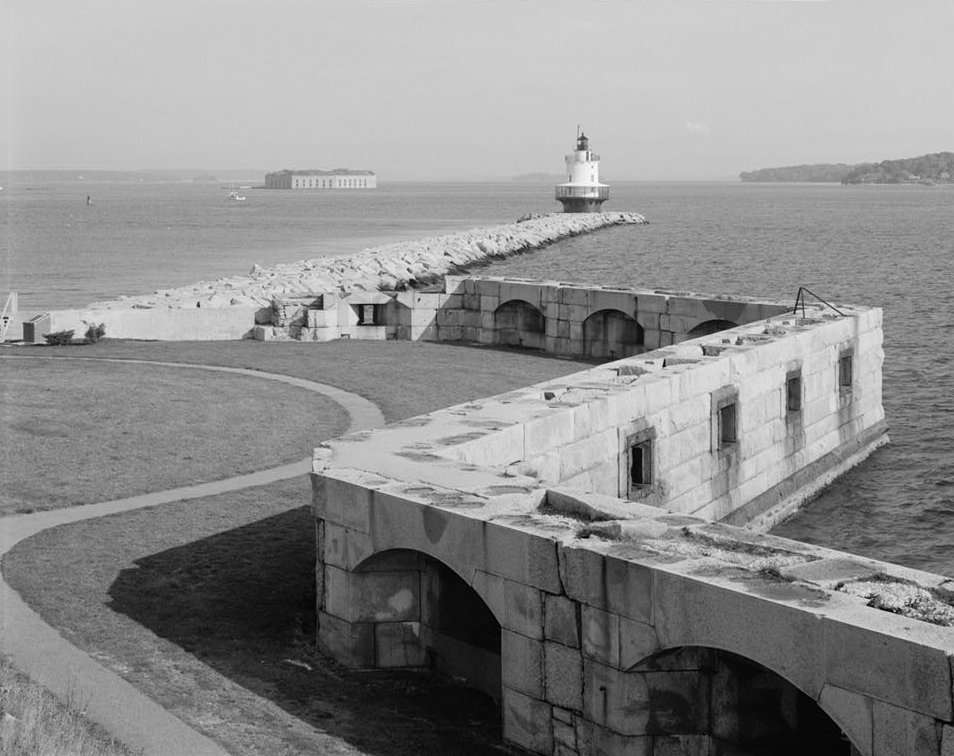
- Fort Preble, showing some of the incomplete Third System casemates built during the Civil War. Spring Point Ledge Light and Fort Gorges are in the background.

Site information
- Type: Coastal Defense
- Owner: Southern Maine Community College
- Open to the public: yes

Location
- Location in Maine
- Coordinates: 43°38′55″N 70°13′35″W

Site history
- Built: 1808
- Built by: United States Army
- In use: 1808–1950
- Battles/wars: War of 1812; American Civil War; World War I World War II

Fort Preble was a military fort in South Portland, Maine, United States, built in 1808 and progressively added to through 1906. The fort was active during all major wars from the War of 1812 through World War II. The fort was deactivated in 1950. It is now on the campus of Southern Maine Community College.

== Construction ==
Secretary of War Henry Dearborn authorized construction of Fort Preble in 1808 with his son, Massachusetts Militia officer and future general Henry A. S. Dearborn, supervising the construction. The fort was named in honor of Commodore Edward Preble, who led a squadron of American warships during the Barbary Wars. Preble died in Portland in 1807 and is buried there.

The initial construction at Fort Preble was part of the Second System of US fortifications. It was a star fort made of stone, brick, and sod, with 14 heavy guns including two 50-pounder (7.25-inch, 184 mm) Columbiads. The fort is described in the Secretary of War's report for December 1811 as "an enclosed star fort of masonry, with a circular battery with flanks; mounting 14 heavy guns (with) barracks for one company".

Along with Fort Scammell on nearby House Island, Fort Preble was built to deter attack by a hostile power in the event the United States was considered a belligerent in the ongoing conflict between Great Britain and Napoleonic France. In October 1808, Dearborn ordered a company of the Regiment of Light Artillery under Captain Joseph Chandler to occupy the fort and instructed them to do whatever was necessary to enforce the Embargo Act against embargo-breaking ships. The embargo was an attempt to punish Britain and France for actions against US shipping by prohibiting exports to them; it cut off much of New England's income and was highly unpopular. The embargo was finally lifted in March 1809 when President James Madison took office, but the situation eventually led to the War of 1812.

== War of 1812 ==
Various units manned Fort Preble during the War of 1812. Among them were elements of the Regiment of Light Artillery, the 21st, 33rd, and 34th Regiments of Infantry, as well as US Volunteers, and in times of crisis local militia. When Winfield Scott and other American soldiers returned from British imprisonment in Quebec, they were landed at Fort Preble. Many of them were emaciated and ill, and some died at the post's hospital.

From 1848–1849 and from 1851–1853, Fort Preble was commanded by Captain Robert Anderson who would become famous for his heroic defense of Fort Sumter at the start of the Civil War.

Fort Preble received new batteries circa 1845, a 12-gun North Battery and a 10-gun South Battery.

== Civil War ==
During the American Civil War, Fort Preble became the headquarters and recruiting depot of the 17th US Infantry Regiment and was also mobilization site for volunteer regiments recruited in Maine.

Soldiers from the fort saw action when Confederate Army raiders entered Portland Harbor on June 26, 1863, aboard a captured ship named Archer. The Confederates captured the United States Revenue Cutter Caleb Cushing the next day, and attempted an escape in an action known as the Battle of Portland Harbor. They were pursued by two steamers carrying soldiers and artillery pieces from Fort Preble, as well as about 100 civilian volunteers. Light wind made escape impossible and the Confederates abandoned the Caleb Cushing in boats after setting the ship on fire. The fire detonated the ship's magazines and the Cushing was destroyed by the explosion. Twenty-three Confederate prisoners were captured and taken to Fort Preble. They remained at Fort Preble until they were transferred to prisoner of war camps.

During this action, Fort Preble was commanded by Major George Lippitt Andrews. (Not to be confused with Brevet Major General George Leonard Andrews.) Andrews was a native of Rhode Island who was appointed lieutenant colonel of the 1st Missouri Infantry at the start of the war. He was mustered out of volunteer service in September 1861 and was commissioned in the Regular Army as the major of the 17th Infantry. He was promoted to lieutenant colonel in 1864. In January 1871 he was promoted to colonel and assigned as commander of the 25th Infantry, one of the Regular Army's four African-American regiments at the time. He commanded the 25th Infantry for 21 years until he retired from the Army in 1892.

On 15 July 1863, Billy Laird, a private in the 17th Maine Regiment, was executed by firing squad at Fort Preble after being charged with desertion. President Abraham Lincoln pardoned Laird but the telegraph message never got through due to the fact the telegraph wires in New York City which relayed the message from Washington, D.C. to Maine were cut during the July 1863 draft riots. Laird was the only Maine soldier in the Civil War to be executed for desertion.

Construction on a major expansion of Fort Preble was undertaken during the Civil War. The old star fort remained to cover the land approach, and new granite casemates typical of the Third System were to be built on the three water sides of the fort. Only a single tier of guns was projected. This project was abandoned incomplete, with some of the casemates remaining to the present.

== Post Civil War ==
In the 1870s Fort Preble was modernized under the supervision of Army engineer Thomas Lincoln Casey, who is best known for overseeing the completion of the Washington Monument. These improvements included added emplacements for large caliber guns (typically 8-inch converted rifles) behind earthen parapets, as masonry walls were found to be ineffective against rifled artillery shells.

== Twentieth century ==
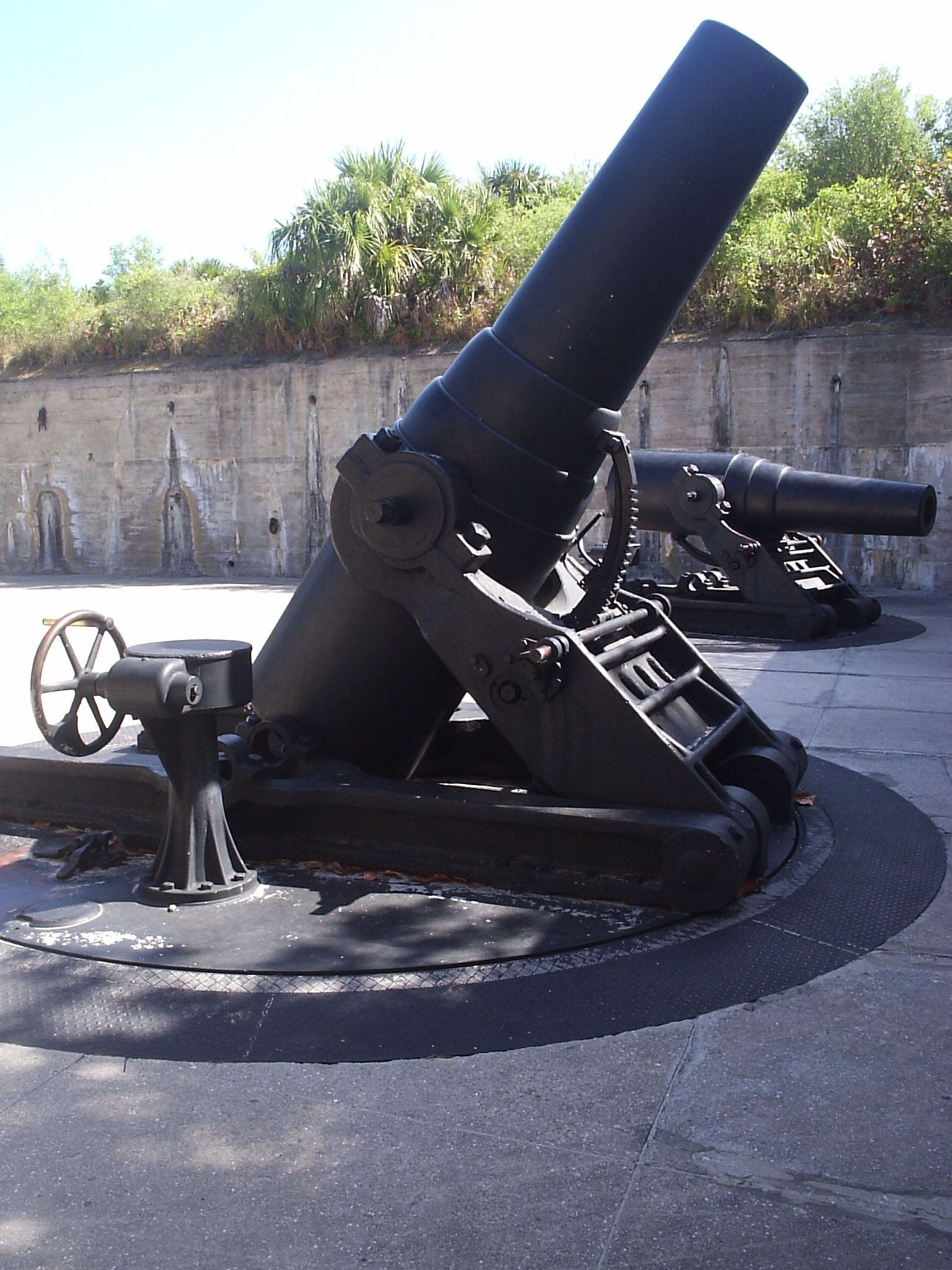
Two M1890MI 12-inch mortars at Fort DeSoto, FL, similar to those at Fort Preble.

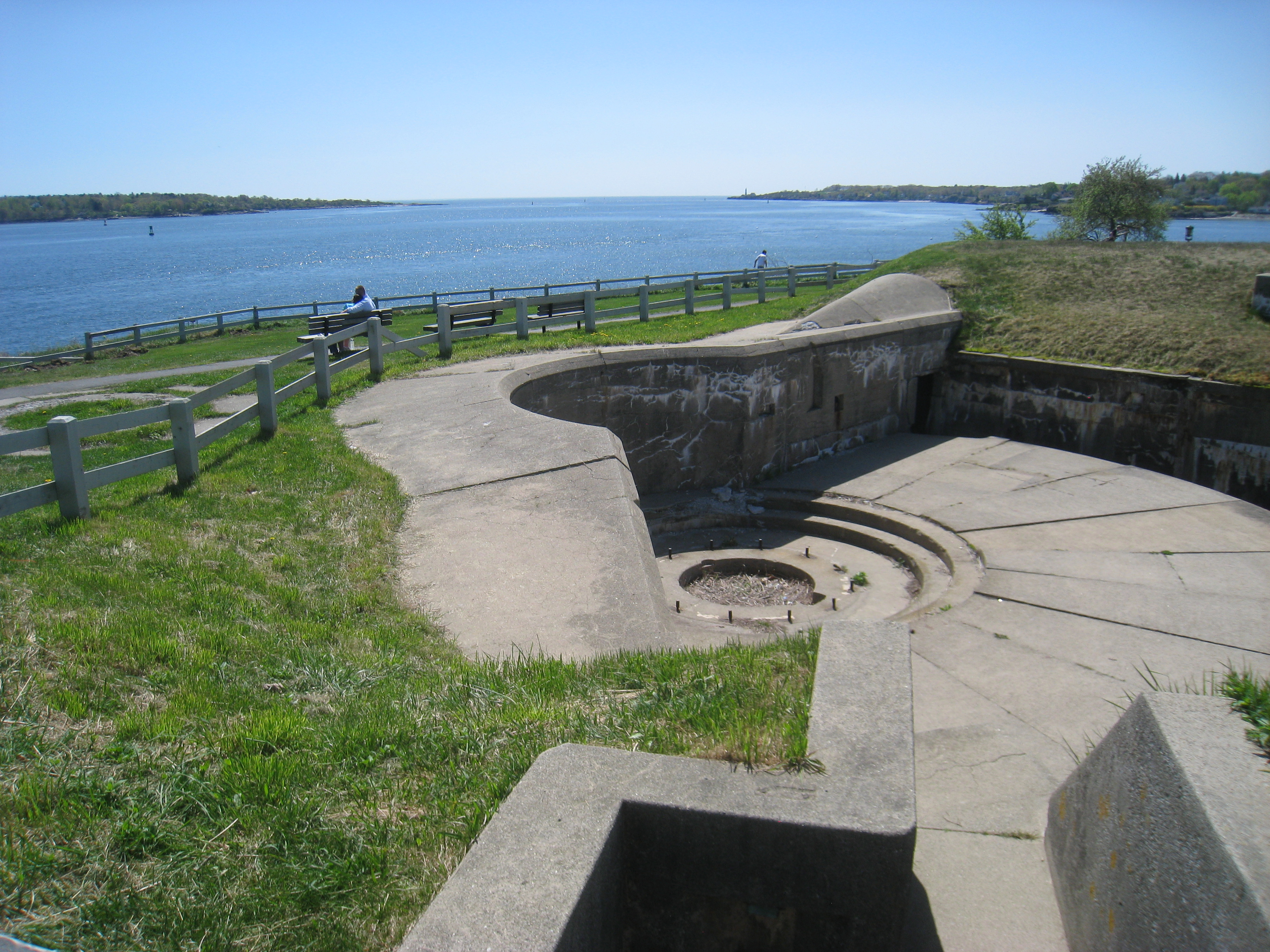
One of the six-inch disappearing gun emplacements of Battery Rivardi

In 1896–1906 several modern Endicott era coast defense batteries were installed at the fort as part of the Coast Defenses of Portland, which also included Fort Williams, Fort McKinley, and Fort Levett. The star fort was demolished to make room for these batteries. Batteries Kearny and Chase totaled sixteen 12-inch mortars (305 mm) and were completed in 1901. These were named for Brigadier General Stephen W. Kearny of the Mexican–American War and Lt. Colonel Constantine Chase of the Civil War. Originally all sixteen mortars were Battery Kearny, but Battery Chase was named in 1906, with each battery comprising eight mortars. They were followed in 1906 by Battery Rivardi with two "disappearing" 6-inch (152 mm) guns and Battery Mason with one 3-inch (76 mm) gun. Battery Rivardi was named for John J. U. Rivardi of the 1st US Artillerists and Engineers, who served 1795–1802 and worked on the First System forts. Battery Mason was named for Philip D. Mason, an artillery officer killed in the Civil War. Two mortars from Battery Kearny-Chase were moved to West Point in 1911, probably to instruct cadets in their use.

The fort remained active through World War I, but was partially disarmed as part of a program to send heavy artillery and railway artillery to the Western Front. Battery Rivardi's two 6-inch guns were shipped to France for use as field guns in 1917 and were not returned to the fort. Six mortars from Batteries Kearny and Chase were removed in 1918–19 for use as railway mortars; this was part of a general halving of mortars to alleviate overcrowding of their emplacements during reloading. This left Fort Preble with eight mortars and one 3-inch gun. Two gun platforms in front of Battery Rivardi were for 3-inch antiaircraft guns installed at many coast defense installations in the World War I era.

In 1924, the Coast Artillery adopted a regimental organization, and the Regular Army's 8th Coast Artillery Regiment was formed at Fort Preble. A reserve regiment to supplement the regular forces in wartime was also formed, the 240th Coast Artillery of the Maine National Guard. Both of these regiments garrisoned the Harbor Defenses of Portland during early World War II, in which Fort Preble was a naval net depot for net laying ships and a control station for the Casco Bay degaussing range. All remaining mortars were scrapped in 1942; Fort Preble was superseded by new defenses centered on Battery Steele on Peaks Island. Only one 3-inch gun remained, which was removed in 1946.

After World War II it was determined that coast defense forts were obsolete and Fort Preble, along with most forts of its kind, was inactivated in 1950.

== Educational institution ==
In 1952 the fort was sold to the State of Maine and became the campus of the Southern Maine Vocational Technical Institute (SMVTI) which was renamed In 1989 as Southern Maine Technical College (SMTC) and later to Southern Maine Community College (SMCC).

Some of Fort Preble's original early 20th Century brick buildings (including officers' quarters, barracks and a fire station) remain and are in a good state of preservation.

Spring Point Ledge Light was built near the site in 1897. A 900-foot (270 m) granite breakwater that extends from the fort and surrounds the lighthouse was later added in 1951.

== See also ==
- Seacoast defense in the United States
- United States Army Coast Artillery Corps
- List of coastal fortifications of the United States
- Harbor Defenses of Portland
