= Stewart Brown (disambiguation) =

Stewart Brown is a poet. Stewart Brown may also refer to:

- Stewart B. Brown, American politician from Maine
- Stewart J. Brown, ecclesiastical historian
