= List of mayors of South Portland, Maine =

The following is a list of mayors of the city of South Portland, Maine, United States.

- Edward C. Reynolds, 1899-1900
- Charles N. Trefethen, 1901-1902
- George T. Spear, 1903-1904
- Geo. H. Weeks, 1905-1907
- Fred G. Hamilton, 1908-1909
- John A. S. Dyer, 1910-1913
- Charles E. West, 1914-1918
- Frederick W. Hinckley, 1919
- William R. McDonald, 1920-1925
- George H. Minott, 1926-1928
- Edward Perley Bullock, ca.1929-1930
- Josiah F. Cobb, ca.1931-1932
- Simon M. Hamlin, 1933-1934
- Philip G. Willard, ca.1950 (council chair)
- Stewart B. Brown, 1957
- Harold M. Macomber, 1975, 1978
- Santo DiPietro, 1986–1987
- Maxine R. Beecher, ca.2005
- Rosemarie De Angelis, ca.2010
- Tom Blake, ca.2014
- Katherine W. Lewis, ca.2020
- Deqa Dhalac, 2022
- Kate Lewis, 2023
- Misha C. Pride, ca.2024
- Richard J. Matthews, 2025
- Elyse C. Tipton, 2026

== See also ==
- South Portland history
