= Burbeck =

Burbeck may refer to:

- Burbeck, California
- Henry Burbeck
