= Harold M. Macomber =

American politician

George H. Minott

Mayor of South Portland, Maine
- In office 1975–1975

Mayor of South Portland, Maine
- In office 1978–1978

Member of the Maine House of Representatives
- In office January 1981 – December 1992

Personal details
- Born: 1914
- Died: June 12, 2002 (aged 87–88)

Harold M. Macomber (1914 – June 12, 2002) was an American politician from Maine. Macomber, a Democratic, served as mayor of South Portland in 1975 and 1978. He also served two terms (1981–1992) in the Maine House of Representatives. During part of his time in the Legislature, Macomber served as chair of the Transportation Committee.

== See also ==
- List of mayors of South Portland, Maine
