= Willard Beach =

Neighborhood in South Portland, Maine, United States

Coordinates: 43°38′39.2″N 70°13′39.3″W

Willard Beach is a beach and neighborhood in South Portland, Maine. The beach, which covers 4 acres (1.6 ha), used for swimming as well as commercial and recreational boating. Southern Maine Community College abuts the beach. Willard Beach is known for its views of Spring Point Ledge Light as well as island forts including Fort Gorges.

WillardFest is an annual one day neighborhood festival which began in 2012.

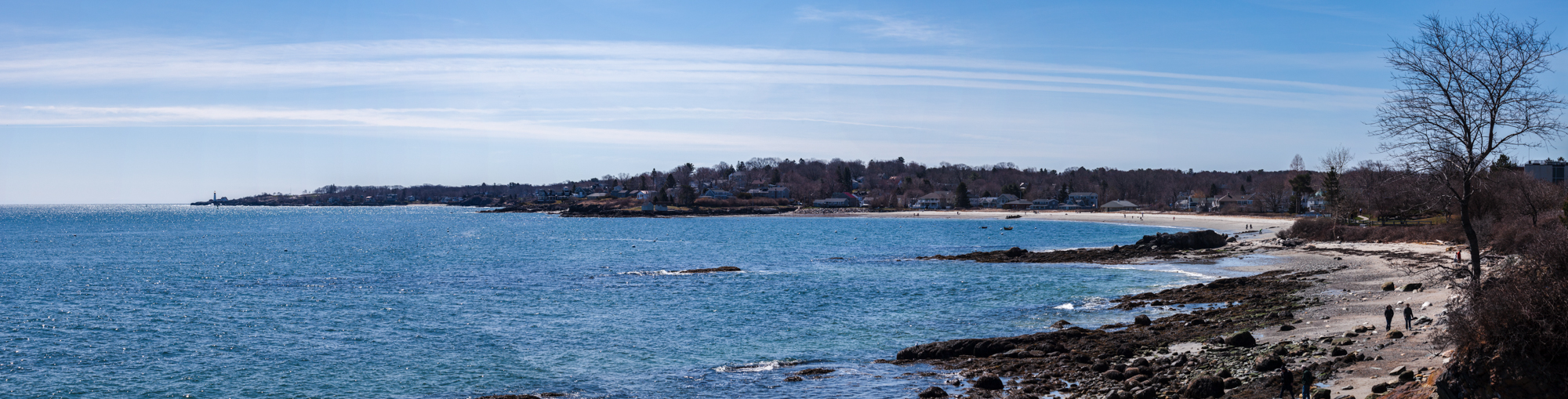
Panoramic view of Willard Beach in 2016
