= Louis Lebègue Duportail =

French general (1743–1802)

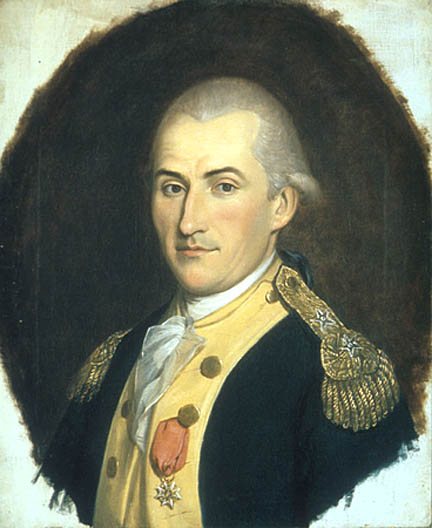
- Portrait by Charles Willson Peale (Independence National Historical Park)

Minister of War
- In office 25 May 1791 – 7 December 1791
- Monarch: Louis XVI
- Preceded by: Office established
- Succeeded by: Louis de Narbonne-Lara

Secretary of State for War
- In office 16 November 1790 – 25 May 1791
- Monarch: Louis XVI
- Preceded by: Jean-Frédéric de la Tour du Pin-Gouvernet
- Succeeded by: Office abolished

Chief Engineer of the Continental Army
- In office 22 July 1777 – 10 October 1783
- Preceded by: Col. Rufus Putnam
- Succeeded by: Lieut. Col. Stephen Rochefontaine (as Commandant of the Corps of Artillerists and Engineers)

Personal details
- Born: 14 May 1743 Pithiviers, France
- Died: 12 August 1802 (aged 59)
- Occupation: Military engineer; politician

Military service
- Allegiance: Kingdom of France; United States
- Branch: French Army; Continental Army
- Years of service: 1765–1790
- Rank: Major-General
- Wars: American Revolutionary War

Louis Antoine Jean Le Bègue de Presle Duportail (Note: Some sources spell his name as Louis Le Bèque de Presle du Portail, with a mistaken ⟨q⟩ instead of a ⟨g⟩.) (French: [lwi ləbɛɡ dəpʁɛl dypɔʁtaj]; 14 May 1743 – 12 August 1802) was a French military leader who served as a volunteer and the Chief Engineer of the Continental Army during the American Revolutionary War. He also served as the last Secretary of State for War and first Minister of War during the beginning of the French Revolution.

== Early life and education ==
Louis Lebègue Duportail was born in 1743 at Pithiviers, France. He graduated from the royal engineer school at Mézières in 1765.

== Military career ==
Promoted to lieutenant colonel in the Royal Corps of Engineers, Duportail was secretly sent to America in March 1777 to serve in Washington's Continental Army under an agreement between Benjamin Franklin and the government of King Louis XVI of France. He was appointed colonel and chief engineer of the Continental Army, July 1777; brigadier general, November 17, 1777; commander, Corps of Engineers, May 1779; and major general, November 16, 1781.

Duportail helped Washington evolve the primarily defensive military strategy that wore down the British Army, and participated in fortifications planning from Boston, Massachusetts to Charleston, South Carolina, where he was captured following the surrender of the city in May 1780. Subsequently exchanged, he also directed the construction of siege works at the Battle of Yorktown, site of the decisive Franco-American victory of the Revolutionary War. During the encampment at Valley Forge in late 1777 and early 1778, his headquarters was at Cressbrook Farm.

Returning to France in October 1783, Duportail became an infantry officer and in 1788 a Maréchal-de-Camp (brigadier general). He served as France's minister of war from November 16, 1790, through December 7, 1791, during the beginning of the French Revolution and promoted military reforms. Forced into hiding by radical Jacobins, he escaped to America and bought a farm near Valley Forge, Pennsylvania. He lived there until 1802, when he died at sea while attempting to return to France.

== Notes ==
This article contains public domain text from "Major General Louis Lebègue Duportail". Portraits and Profiles Chief Engineer - 1775 to Present.

== Footnotes ==
Political offices
New office	Minister of War; May – December 1791	Succeeded by Louis, Comte de Narbonne-Lara
Military offices
Preceded by Colonel Rufus Putnam	Chief Engineer of the Continental Army; 1777 – 1783	Succeeded by Lieutenant Colonel Stephen Rochefontaine as Commandant of the Corps of Artillerists and Engineers
