= Deqa Dhalac =

American politician

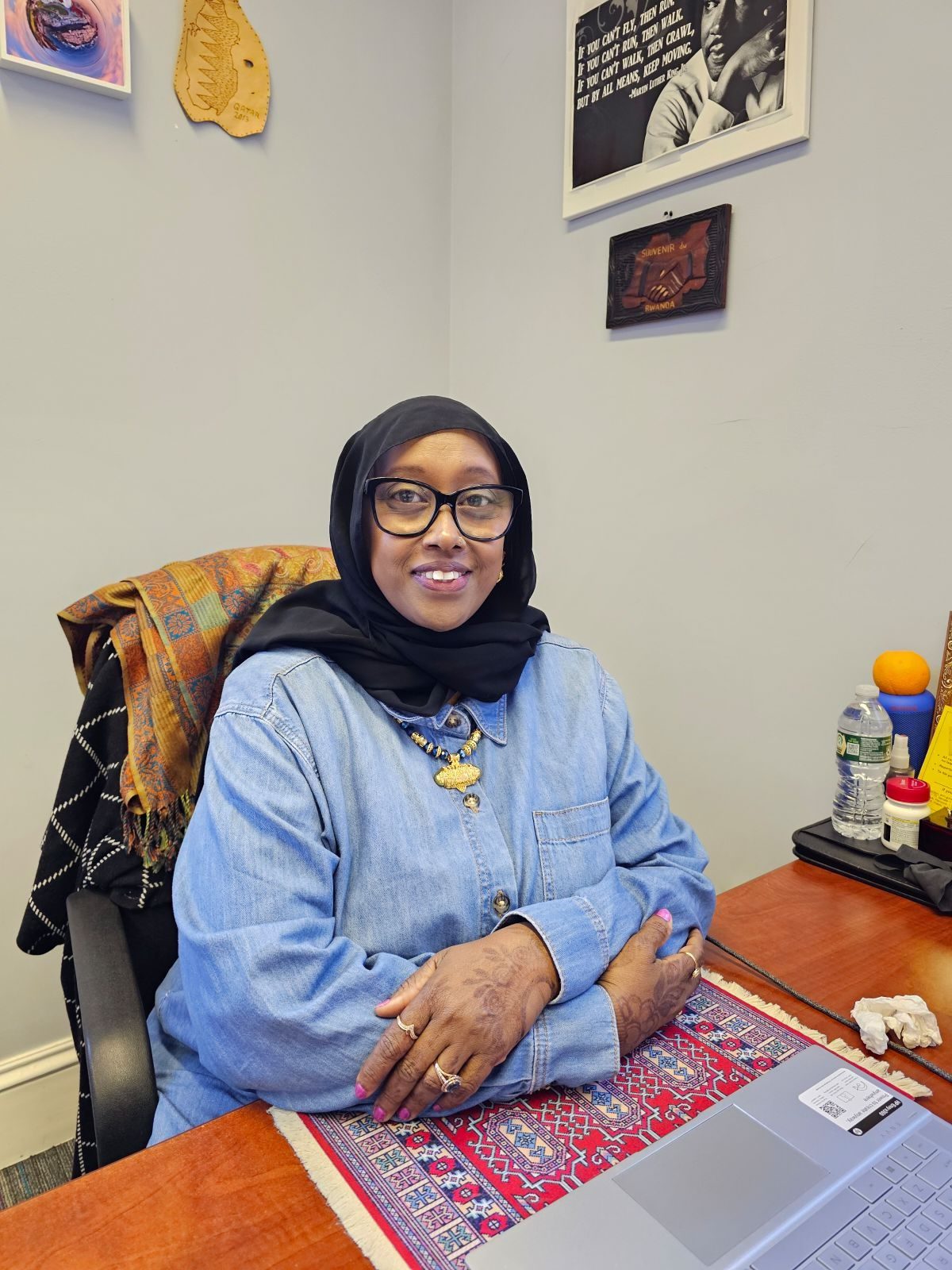

Member of the Maine House of Representatives from the 120th district
- Incumbent
- Assumed office December 7, 2022
- Preceded by: Richard Evans

Mayor of South Portland, Maine
- In office December 7, 2021 – December 7, 2022
- Preceded by: Misha Pride
- Succeeded by: Kate Lewis (designate)

Personal details
- Born: Deqa Dhalac; 1968 (age 57–58) Mogadishu, Somalia
- Party: Democratic
- Children: 3
- Education: University of New Hampshire; University of New England

Deqa Dhalac (born c. 1968 or 1969) is a member of the Maine House of Representatives for the 120th District. A Somali emigrant, she served as the mayor of South Portland, Maine from 2021 to 2022, becoming the first African-born female mayor in the United States. Alongside Mana Abdi, she is the first Somali-American to serve as a Maine legislator.

== Early life ==
Dhalac was born in the capital city of Mogadishu, the middle child with two brothers. Her father, a petroleum engineer, was very politically outspoken. Dhalac described her father as a feminist because he believed in the importance of girls' education and their important role in the family unit. He died in 1989. She learned English as a child as part of her education.

== Time period as a refugee ==
Due to the precipitating events leading to the Somali Civil War, Dhalac fled in 1990, to Rome on a flight intended to head to Libya. Because there were no more embassy services available on the precipice of war, she planned to apply for asylum. Seventeen other people had the same idea and were held at the airport for over a month. She was released to the care of her cousin who lived in Italy. Dhalac then moved to England, and to Toronto in 1991.

== Life in America ==
In 1992, she married Abdi Farah, a Somali businessman from Atlanta, whose family had been close with her own, and began activism to get immigrants to become citizens and register to vote. She worked as a cashier in a parking garage. With her accounting degree, she received an accounts receivable job in a hotel a few months later. Because she had known English as a second language, it was easier for her to excel in her career in the United States.

In 2005, she moved to Lewiston, Maine, with her family but without her husband, who stayed to take care of his business in Atlanta but visits them frequently. She has lived in South Portland, Maine since 2008, where she raised her three children.

Dhalac became an interpreter for Catholic Charities Maine before opening her own interpreting service, and earned two masters' degrees in policy and social work from the University of New Hampshire and the University of New England.

She co-founded co-founder at Cross Cultural Community Services (CCCS). She was assistant executive director at Gateway Community Services.

== Political career ==
In 2018, Dhalac became the first Somali-American and the first Muslim elected to the South Portland city council. She then ran unopposed in 2020.

Dhalac made national headlines as the first Somali-American mayor in the United States when she was elected unanimously by the City Council as the mayor of South Portland.

In 2022, after State Representative Victoria Morales withdrew from the race for Maine's 120th State House District, Dhalac was nominated to take her place on the ballot. She won election to the Maine House of Representatives on November 8, 2022.

In early 2026, Dhalac announced she would not seek reelection, saying that during her time serving in the Maine Legislature, the climate has become "increasingly hostile and unsafe." Dhalac previously served as the co-executive director of Gateway Community Services, which has been under scrutiny after documents show the organization was overpaid by the state $1.7 million for Medicaid services. State Republican leaders last month requested she be removed from the appropriations committee following Gateway's referral by DHHS to the Office of the Attorney General for investigation.

== See also ==
- List of mayors of South Portland, Maine
