= George H. Minott =

American politician

George Henry Minott

Mayor of South Portland, Maine
- In office December 1944 – December 1948

Member of the Maine Senate
- In office December 1928 – December 1930

Personal details
- Born: December 15, 1893 Cape Elizabeth, Maine
- Died: June 22, 1957 (aged 63) South Portland, Maine

George Henry Minott (December 15, 1893 - June 22, 1957) was an American politician from Maine.

== Biography ==
He was born on December 15, 1893.

Minott, a Republican, served three terms as the Mayor of South Portland, Maine from 1926 to 1928. He also served a single term in the Maine Senate from 1929 to 1930.

He died on June 22, 1957.

== See also ==
- List of mayors of South Portland, Maine
