= Stewart B. Brown =

American politician

Mayor of South Portland, Maine
- In office 1957–1957

Member of the Maine House of Representatives
- In office January 1961 – December 1964

Personal details
- Died: December 22, 1973

Stewart B. Brown (died December 22, 1973) was an American politician from Maine. Brown, a Republican, served as Mayor of South Portland in 1957. He also served two terms (1961-1964) in the Maine House of Representatives.

== See also ==
- List of mayors of South Portland, Maine
