= South Portland Armory =

Coordinates: 43.63367°N 70.25631°W

The South Portland Armory is an historic armory building in South Portland, Maine, United States. The structure was built in 1941 to support nearby U.S. war production for World War II, including the building of liberty ships. It was built in the Art Deco style and was used by the Maine National Guard until 1996. In 2012, it was listed on Greater Portland Landmarks' Places in Peril list.
