= Santo DiPietro =

American businessperson and politician

Mayor of South Portland, Maine
- In office 1986–1987

Member of the Maine House of Representatives
- In office 1989–1996

Personal details
- Born: November 11, 1934 Portland, Maine
- Died: October 9, 2016 (aged 81) South Portland, Maine
- Party: Democratic
- Education: Northeast Business College
- Occupation: Businessman
- Nickname: Sam

Santo "Sam" DiPietro (November 11, 1934 – October 9, 2016) was an American businessperson and politician from Maine. DiPietro, a Democrat, served on the South Portland City Council for nine years, two of which were as mayor (1986–1987). He also served four terms (8 years) in the Maine House of Representatives (1989–1996). In 1988, DiPietro defeated Republican incumbent Earl G. Nicholson to win his seat in the Legislature.

Born in Portland, Maine, DiPietro graduated from Portland High School and Northeast Business College. He owned and operated a grocery store, DiPietro's Market, in South Portland.

DiPietro died in South Portland, Maine on October 9, 2016.

== See also ==
- List of mayors of South Portland, Maine
