= Victoria Morales =

American politician

Member of the Maine House of Representatives from the 33rd district
- In office December 5, 2018 – December 7, 2022
- Preceded by: Kevin Battle
- Succeeded by: Deqa Dhalac

Personal details
- Party: Democratic
- Spouse: Alberto Morales
- Children: 3
- Education: University of Maine (JD)

Victoria E. Morales is an American attorney and politician from Maine. She is the representative for Maine House District 33. She is on the Ethics committee and the Criminal Justice and Public Safety committee. She ran uncontested in the 2020 House election.
