= Stephen Rochefontaine =

French-born American military engineer

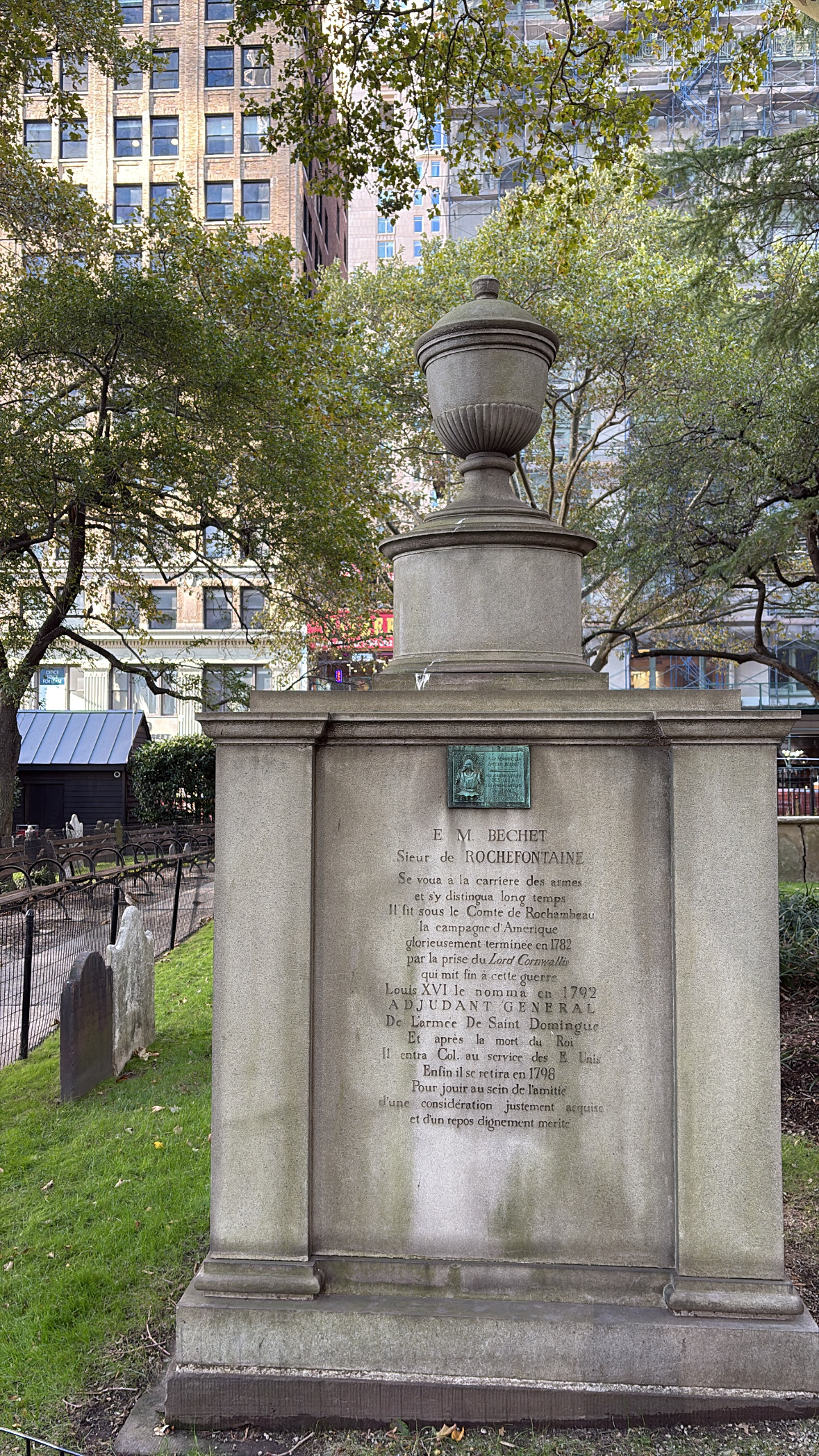
- Rochefontaine's grave at St. Paul's Chapel

Commandant of the Corps of Artillerists and Engineers
- In office 1795–1798
- Preceded by: Louis Lebègue Duportail (as Chief Engineer of the Continental Army)
- Succeeded by: Henry Burbeck

Personal details
- Born: Étienne Nicolas Marie Béchet; February 20, 1755 Aÿ, France
- Died: January 30, 1814 (aged 58) New York City, U.S.
- Occupation: engineer military officer

Military service
- Allegiance: United States
- Branch/service: United States Army
- Years of service: 1778–1798
- Rank: Lieutenant Colonel
- Commands: Corps of Artillerists and Engineers

Stephen Rochefontaine (born Étienne Nicolas Marie Béchet, Sieur de Rochefontaine; February 20, 1755 – January 30, 1814) was a French aristocrat and American military engineer who served as the Commandant of the Corps of Artillerists and Engineers from 1795 to 1798.

== Military career ==
Born in Aÿ, France, Rochefontaine came to America in 1778 after failing to gain a position in the French Royal Corps of Engineers. He volunteered in General Washington's Continental Army on May 15, 1778 and was appointed captain in the Corps of Engineers on September 18, 1778. For his distinguished services at the siege of Yorktown, Rochefontaine was given the brevet rank of major by the United States Congress on November 16, 1781.

He returned to France in 1783 and served as an infantry officer, reaching the rank of colonel in the French Army. He came back to the United States in 1792 and anglicized his first name to Stephen and adopted his title, Rochefontaine, as his surname. President Washington appointed him a civilian engineer to fortify the New England coast, in 1794.

After the new Corps of Artillerists and Engineers was organized, Washington made Rochefontaine a lieutenant colonel and commandant of the new Corps on February 26, 1795. Rochefontaine started a military school at West Point in 1795, but the building and all his equipment were burned the following year. He left the United States Army on May 7, 1798, and lived in New York City, where he died January 30, 1814. He is buried in the churchyard of St. Paul's Chapel in New York.

Military offices
Preceded by Major-General Louis Duportail as Chief Engineer of the Continental Army	Commandant of the Corps of Artillerists and Engineers; 1795 – 1798	Succeeded by Lieutenant Colonel Henry Burbeck
