= Frederick W. Hinckley =

American politician

Mayor of South Portland, Maine
- In office 1919–1919

Member of the Maine House of Representatives
- In office January 1919 – December 1922

Member of the Maine Senate
- In office January 1923 – December 1926

Personal details
- Born: May 26, 1878 Calais, Maine
- Died: May 11, 1933 (aged 54) South Portland, Maine
- Occupation: Politician, lawyer, and real estate developer

Frederick Wheeler Hinckley (May 26, 1878 – May 11, 1933) was an American politician, lawyer, and real estate developer from Maine. He served as mayor of South Portland, Maine and four terms in the Maine Legislature (1919-1926). He also owned more than 100 acres of land in South Portland, which he developed into a unique housing subdivision called the Sylvan Site.

== Politics ==
Hinckley, a Republican, served from 1919 to 1926 in the Maine Legislature; from 1919 to 1922, he served in the Maine House of Representatives and from 1923 to 1926 in the Maine Senate. On the municipal level, Hinckley served as Mayor of South Portland in 1919.

During the fall of 1926, Hinckley served as an attorney for lumber magnate and Republican nominee for U.S. Senate Arthur R. Gould. Gould faced Democrat Fulton J. Redman in a special election to replace the recently deceased Bert M. Fernald. The election was viewed as key to maintaining control of the Senate by conservative Republicans. During the campaign, opponents of Gould, including the leadership of the Ku Klux Klan in Maine, revealed that the candidate had paid a $100,000 bribe to former New Brunswick premier James Kidd Flemming fourteen years prior. Though Gould did not deny the charges, he was elected by a significant majority on November 29 nonetheless. On January 4, 1927, Hinckley testified before a U.S. Senate subcommittee that because Gould had not committed any crimes related to his election and that the Senate had no right to expel his client and therefore he should continue to be the duly elected Senator from Maine. After several days of testimony by Hinckley and fielding questions on constitutional law from the subcommittee, Gould was not expelled by the Senate.

In 1928, Hinckley unsuccessfully sought the Republican nomination for Governor, which he lost to William Tudor Gardiner.

== Real estate development ==
In 1907, Hinckley built his personal residence at 925 Sawyer Street on 21 acres of land. After the completion of the Million Dollar Bridge between Portland and South Portland in 1916, Hinckley purchased an additional adjacent 85 acres. In 1921, as the demand for suburban housing spiked in the aftermath of the First World War, he began building a planned residential subdivision which he called the Sylvan Site. Originally scheduled to include over 200 single-family homes, only 37 were built before the onset of the Great Depression. The neighborhood is known for its custom architecture; Hinckley designed each home himself in a variety of architectural styles that were popular at the time.

Hinckley Park, formerly part of his land holdings, is now one of the city's largest public parks.

== Personal ==
Hinckley was born in 1878 in Calais, Maine. He was a lawyer by profession. His brother, George W. Hinckley, was a judge.

== See also ==
- List of mayors of South Portland, Maine
