= South Portland High School =

Location
- 637 Highland Avenue; South Portland, (Cumberland County), Maine 04106; United States
- Coordinates: 43°37′19″N 70°16′06″W

Information
- Type: Public
- Motto: Riot Pride
- Established: 1874
- School district: South Portland School Department
- CEEB code: 200960
- Principal: Sarah Glenn
- Teaching staff: 80.70 (FTE)
- Grades: 9–12
- Enrollment: 995 (2023-2024)
- Student to teacher ratio: 12.33
- Colors: Red and White
- Mascot: Red Riot
- Newspaper: Riot Reader
- Website: www.spsdme.org/o/sphs

South Portland High School is a public high school located in South Portland, Maine, United States.

The first high school in what is now South Portland was built in 1874 while the city was part of Cape Elizabeth, Maine. The school was on the 2nd floor of a new municipal building built in 1874 until that building burnt down in 1921. The current building on Highland Avenue was erected in 1952, with a gymnasium added in 1958, an annex in 1962, and an auditorium and cafeteria in 1997. It was originally built for middle (then “junior high”) school students until the high school and middle school switched building in 1960.

== Renovations ==
The current high school building has been renovated and expanded. Renovation was approved in a 2010 referendum, and groundbreaking took place in May 2012. Over 100,000 square feet was added to the school. The first stage of expansion to the school was complete in early January 2014. On January 3, 2015, the final phase of the renovations were completed and staff moved into the building to set up for class on January 5. In total, the project lasted 33 months and cost a total of $47.3 million. At the time, it was among the highest-price high school projects in state history and was paid for entirely without state funds.

== Notable alumni ==
- Kristin Barry, distance runner, 2-time Olympic Trials Marathon qualifier
- Jim Beattie, Major League Baseball player
- Brett Brown, former head coach of the Philadelphia 76ers
- Charlie Furbush, Major League Baseball pitcher
- Chris Markwood, basketball coach
- Edward C. Reynolds, judge, state legislator (Class of 1877)
- Leigh Saufley, first woman Chief Justice of the Maine Supreme Judicial Court 2001–2020; dean of the University of Maine School of Law 2020-
- Bill Swift, Major League Baseball pitcher
