= South Portland Public Library =

Coordinates: 43.634°N 70.2500°W

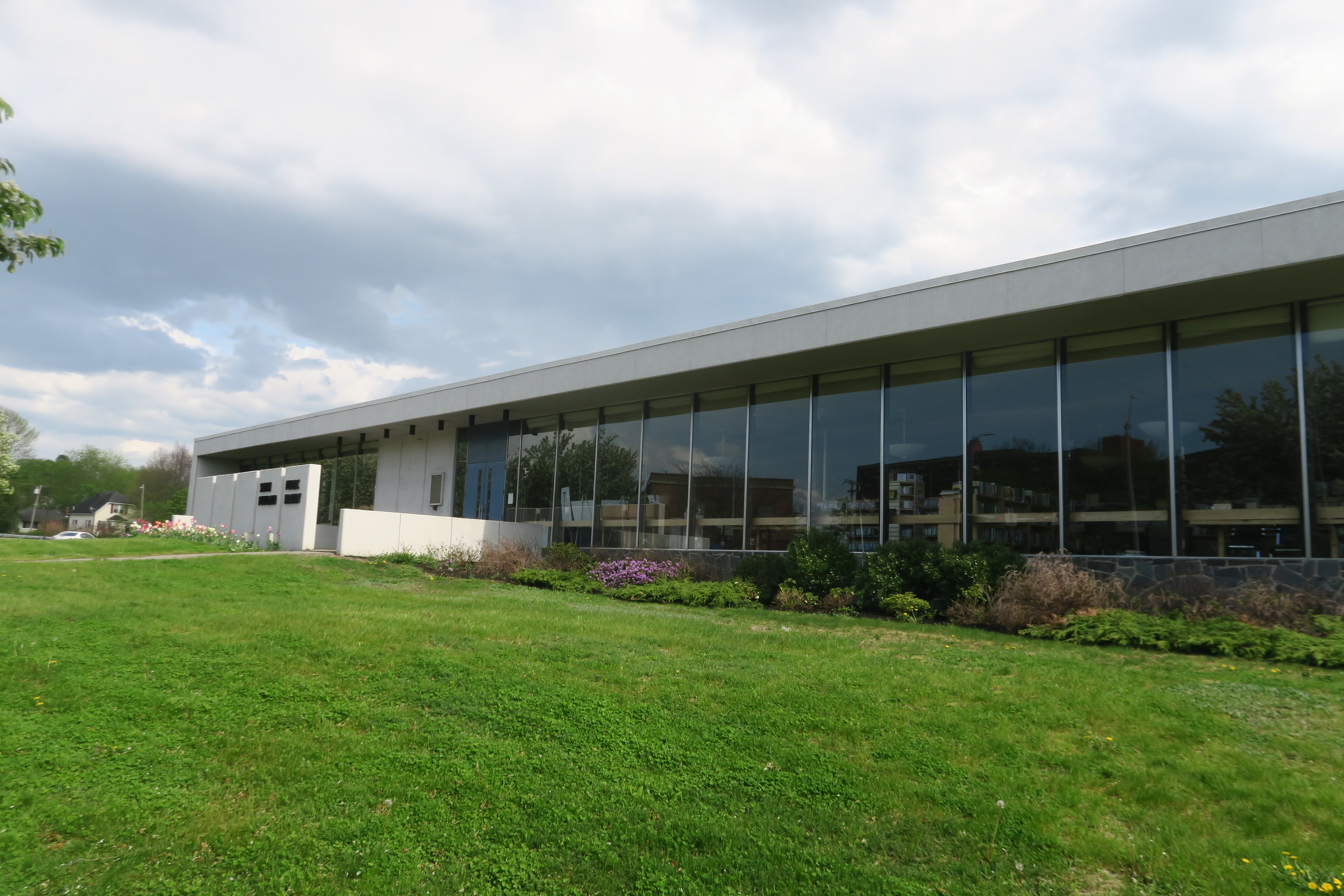
- Location: South Portland, Maine, United States
- Type: Public
- Established: 1966
- Branches: Memorial Branch Library

Collection
- Size: 84,000

Access and use
- Circulation: 293,000
- Population served: 25,002

Other information
- Budget: $669,291
- Director: Kevin Davis
- Employees: 17
- Website: southportlandlibrary.com

The South Portland Public Library is the public library serving South Portland, Maine.

In 1965, ground was broken for the $300,579 library building. The doors were opened for service to the public in 1966.

The Memorial Branch Library was opened on Wescott Road in 1976.
