= Edward Reynolds (American politician) =

American politician

Edward Clayton Reynolds (1856–1938) was an American lawyer and politician from Maine.

Reynolds was born in Braintree, Massachusetts and grew up in portion of Cape Elizabeth, Maine that is now South Portland. He was one of the first 4 graduates of what is now South Portland High School in 1877. He earned a Master of Laws degree from Georgetown University Law School in 1886. A Republican, Reynolds served from 1889 to 1897 as Register of Probate for Cumberland County, Maine. Elected in 1896 to the Maine Senate for Cumberland County, Reynolds served two terms before leaving the Senate in 1900. In 1899–1900, Reynolds also served as South Portland's first mayor after separating from Cape Elizabeth.

== See also ==
- List of mayors of South Portland, Maine
