= Light Artillery (United States) =

- Active: 1808 - 1821
- Country: United States
- Branch: Army
- Type: Field artillery
- Engagements: War of 1812

Commanders
- Commanders: John Saunders (1809-1810); Abram Eustis (1810-1811); John Roger Fenwick (1811-1812); Moses Porter (1812-1821)

The Regiment of Light Artillery was an artillery regiment which served in the United States Army from 1808 to 1821.

== History ==
It was formed in 1808 and consisted of 10 companies. It served in the War of 1812 and fought in the following battles -

- Battle of Queenston Heights, Oct. 13, 1812
- Capture of York (now Toronto), April 27, 1813
- Siege of Fort Meigs, Ohio, May 5, 1813
- Battle of Fort George, May 27, 1813
- Battle of Stony Creek, June 6, 1813
- Battle of Chrystler's Fields, Nov. 11, 1813
- Defense of Fort Oswego, New York, May 5 and 6, 1814
- Battle of Plattsburgh, New York, Sept. 11, 1814

After the War of 1812, the companies of the Light Artillery Regiment served mostly at coastal fortifications.

In 1821 the Light Artillery Regiment was consolidated with the Corps of Artillery to form four artillery regiments with 9 companies each. Of the regiments 10 companies, five (A, B, C, D and E) were assigned to the 1st Artillery, two (F and I) were assigned to the 3rd Artillery, two (E and K) were assigned to the 4th Artillery and one (H) was disbanded in April 1821.

The Light Artillery Regiment was commanded by Colonel Moses Porter from 12 March 1812 to 1 June 1821.

The national and regimental colors are viewable at https://www.jstor.org/stable/2937578?seq=2

== See also ==
- Early U.S. Artillery formations
