= Henry Burbeck =

United States Army general

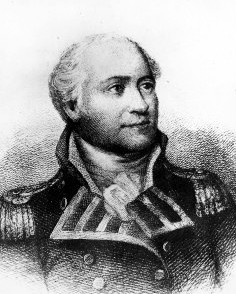
- Born: June 10, 1754; Boston, Massachusetts
- Died: October 2, 1848 (aged 94) New London, Connecticut
- Branch: United States Army
- Service years: 1775-1784; 1786-1815
- Rank: Brevet Brigadier-General
- Commands: Corps of Artillerists and Engineers; Connecticut Militia
- Conflicts: American Revolutionary War: Battle of Bunker Hill; Battle of Brandywine; Battle of Germantown; Battle of Monmouth; War of 1812

Henry Burbeck (June 10, 1754 – October 2, 1848) was a senior officer of the United States Army who served as the Commandant of the Corps of Artillerists and Engineers from 1798 to 1802.

== Early life ==
Henry Burbeck was born in Boston on June 10, 1754, the son of William Burbeck and his wife Jerusha Glover of Boston. His father was an ordnance storekeeper at Castle William, in Boston Harbor. When the British took over the castle in 1770 he stayed on, but left the service in 1774. With the help of Dr. Joseph Warren he received an appointment as superintendent of the provincial artillery laboratory, joining the Patriot cause.

Burbeck's education consisted of a public writing school in the North End of Boston under John Tileston (1735–1826). He would later credit his father with the remainder of his education. Prior to his military service, Henry worked at the copper-smith's forge with Paul Revere. He married his first wife, Abigail Webb, on April 12, 1775, in Boston.

== Revolutionary War service ==
At the outbreak of the Battle of Lexington, Burbeck's father escaped to Cambridge and reported to the Committee on Public Safety and its leader, General Joseph Warren, to join the patriot cause which resulted in a price being placed on his head by the British. Burbeck joined his father in Cambridge where they made ammunition used at the Battle of Bunker Hill and also participated in the battle. Henry served as a lieutenant in the Battle of Bunker Hill and his commission was signed by General Joseph Warren on May 19, 1775. Following the Battle of Bunker Hill, Burbeck married Abigail Webb on August 12, 1775, in Boston.

He was assigned as a lieutenant of artillery to the Massachusetts line commanded by Colonel Richard Gridley, the Continental Army's first Chief Engineer and artillery commander, in 1775.

=== Washington's campaigns ===
In 1777, he briefly joined the army at Saratoga until he was assigned to Pennsylvania to join Gen. George Washington's army. He fought in the battles of Brandywine and Germantown. He remained in the Artillery Corps under General Henry Knox and, in 1777, assumed command of a company of the 3rd Continental Artillery Regiment commanded by Colonel John Crane. He marched with General Washington and the Continental Army from Valley Forge to New Jersey in 1778. Following the march, he fought in the Battle of Monmouth.

His unit was sent North and he remained in White Plains, New York, to defend the Hudson Highlands from 1779 to 1783. He marched into New York City when the British army evacuated it at the close of the Revolutionary War.

Burbeck became an original member of the Society of the Cincinnati upon its founding in 1783. He served as president of the Massachusetts Society of the Cincinnati from 1846 until his death in 1848.

Burbeck knew General George Washington personally from his service and it was from Burbeck's associations with foreign officers serving in the American Revolution that he recognized the need to educate and train the army in artillery and engineering. Burbeck recommended the establishment of West Point Military Academy.

== Career in the Early Republic ==
Burbeck was honorably discharged from the Continental Army in January 1784. In October 1786 he was re-commissioned as captain of a company of artillery, one of four in a battalion commanded by Major John Doughty, and commanded the post at West Point, New York, from 1787 to 1789. In 1787, he was ordered by General Knox to Springfield, Massachusetts, to protect the arsenal there is the aftermath of Shays' Rebellion. His wife Abigail died in June 1790 in Bath, Maine.

=== Creek Treaty attempt ===
Burbeck was promoted to Major Commandant of the Artillery Battalion on March 16, 1792. He commanded the Army's Battalion of Artillery and served as General Anthony Wayne's Chief of Artillery in the Northwest Indian War in 1792–1794. He was ordered, on August 29, 1789, to Georgia to serve as a guard to Major General Benjamin Lincoln and Colonel Humphries during the unsuccessful treaty negotiation with the Creek people. He returned to Georgia in 1790 and built a fort on the St. Mary's River.

=== Fort Recovery ===
Burbeck established Fort Recovery in Ohio in 1794 which was named after the lost cannons that were recovered at the site of in the aftermath of St. Clair's defeat by the Indians in 1791. Burbeck buried 200 skulls and numerous bones from Arthur St. Clair's defeat and interred them. Two brass cannons from the 1791 action, recovered by Burbeck in the Wabash, were discharged in honor of the deceased.

=== Fort Mackinac ===
Burbeck oversaw the transfer of power from British to American control of Fort Mackinac in 1796, 13 years after the Treaty of Paris was signed. He served at the fort through 1799.

From 1798 to 1802, Burbeck was the senior regimental commander of artillerists and engineers. He also commanded the Eastern Department of the Army in 1800 and in that year endorsed the creation of a corps of engineers separate from the artillerists. He was Chief of the new Regiment of Artillerists from 1802 to 1815, first as a colonel and then during the War of 1812 as a brevet brigadier general. During the Jefferson administration (1801–1809), Burbeck successfully developed and tested domestically produced cast-iron artillery pieces.

=== Court Martial of Gen. James Wilkinson ===
In 1808, he served on the Court of Inquiry, ordered by President Madison, held at Morin's Tavern in Philadelphia, investigating General James Wilkinson for receiving a pension from the Spanish government while serving in the United States military. Previously, Wilkinson had been a member of the Conway Cabal against Washington and resigned from the army. He received the governorship of Louisiana by Thomas Jefferson in 1805. Wilkinson's close relationship with the Spanish government led to a confrontation with Aaron Burr which ultimately resulted in accusations that Wilkinson was tied to the Spanish government. Other members of the Court of Inquiry included Colonel Thomas Humphrey Cushing of the Infantry and Colonel Jonathan Williams of the Engineers. In September 1811, during the court martial, Wilkinson took exception to the presence of Burbeck and two other members of the court and they were all replaced. Wilkinson was found not guilty on December 25, 1811.

== War of 1812 service ==
At the beginning of the War of 1812, Burbeck was summoned to New London, Connecticut, to relieve Jirah Isham of the command of the state militia. At the same time he was placed in command of Military District No. 2 comprising the states of Connecticut and Rhode Island. While stationed in New London, he received orders to march to Boston to take command there during the blockade by a British squadron commanded by Commodore Sir Thomas Hardy. The winter march resulted in the suffering of many of the men under his command who were frostbitten from exposure to the winter elements. During the march, Burbeck refused any favors offered to him that were not also given to his men.

After returning to New London, in July 1813, he received a letter from Gen. Armstrong which enclosed a copy of a letter written by the Governor of Virginia stating that information from British deserters indicated that British transports, under Admiral George Cockburn, sailed from Chesapeake Bay to New London, Connecticut. Burbeck responded by organizing the state militia to respond while Hardy's fleet lay off New London harbor. Burbeck continued in command of New London to the end of the war.

General Burbeck retired from the Army in June 1815, when the Army was reduced following the signing of the Treaty of Ghent, which ended the war. At the time of Burbeck's retirement, he had served a total of 37 years in the Continental Army and the United States Army. He was one of the relatively few officers who had served in both the American Revolution and the War of 1812.

== Later life ==
Burbeck married Lucy Elizabeth Rudd Caldwell on December 13, 1813, in New London, Connecticut. She was the daughter of Corp. Daniel Rudd Jr. and Abigail Allen. She was first married to Capt. Henry Caldwell of the Marines who died March 12, 1812, at Charlestown, Massachusetts. Caldwell was on board the USS President during the Little Belt affair, an event that is regarded as one of the causes of the War of 1812, and he testified during the Court of Inquiry on the Little Belt Affair which convened in New York in September 1811. Lucy was a descendant of Mayflower passenger and Plymouth Colony Governor William Bradford (1590-1657) and Jonathan Rudd who was married, in a legendary ceremony, at Bride Brook in what is now East Lyme, Connecticut in December 1646. Burbeck was the same exact age as Lucy's father Daniel Rudd Jr., both being born on June 10, 1754. At the time of his marriage to Lucy, Burbeck was 29 years her senior.

General Burbeck purchased a home at 114 Main St., in New London, Connecticut, in 1815. The house was built in 1735 and was one of the few houses in New London that remained after the city was burned by the British in 1781. Gen. Burbeck and his wife lived in the house until he died in 1848.

In 1846, being one of the very few surviving officers who had served in the Revolution, Burbeck was elected president of the Massachusetts Society of the Cincinnati and served in that position until his death two years later.

=== Children ===
Burbeck and his second wife had six children, all born in New London: Susan Henrietta (b. September 23, 1815), Charlotte Augusta (b. March 8, 1818 in New London, Conn., d. July 13, 1897 in New London, Conn.), Henry William (b. May 31, 1819 in New London, Conn., d. February 19, 1840 at sea), Mary Elizabeth (b. March 7, 1821 in New London, Conn., d. July 13, 1897), William Henry (b. October 8, 1823 in New London, Conn., d. February 28, 1905 in New London, Conn.) and John Cathcart (b. February 9, 1825 in New London, Conn., d. April 28, 1904 in New London, Conn.).

Burbeck hoped that his son Henry would follow in his military footsteps, but Henry died when he tried to test his strength by lifting a keg of silver dollars which fell on his foot and severed his toe while at sea on a revenue cutter. By the time the cutter reached New York and a physician was summoned, it was too late and he died. Thereafter, Gen. Burbeck was so overcome by grief that he would not have his son's name spoken in his house.

In his later years, he enjoyed the company of Capt. Bulkeley who also retired to New London. They maintained a close relationship despite the fact that Burbeck was a Whig and Bulkeley was a Democrat.

== Death ==
Henry Burbeck Memorial, Cedar Grove Cemetery, New London, Connecticut

Burbeck died at the age of 94 at his home on Main Street in New London on October 2, 1848, just months after his friend Captain Bulkeley died. The Massachusetts Society of Cincinnati, of which Burbeck was the president, erected a monument to him in Cedar Grove Cemetery (Sec. 4, Lot 1), New London, Connecticut. The inscription on the monument states:

The Massachusetts Society of the Cincinnati Dedicate This Monument to the Memory of Their Late Honored President. He Was An Officer of the Army From the Commencement of the Revolutionary War Until The Close of His Life By a Patriotic and Faithful Discharge of the High and Responsible Duties of a Gallant Soldier And An Exemplary Citizen He Has Been Justly And Eminently Distinguished As He Was Rightfully and Universally Respected.

His wife Lucy died February 22, 1880, in New London and, at the time of her death, was one of the last in the nation to receive a Revolutionary War pension which was $130 a quarter in 1875. Burbeck's daughter Charlotte was made an honorary member of the Lucretia Shaw chapter of the Daughters of the American Revolution. His archive of military papers were sold at auction by Heritage for $107,550.00 on September 13, 2011. In 2014 the bulk of his papers were then acquired by the William L. Clements Library of the University of Michigan.

== Induction Into the Connecticut Hall of Fame ==
Gen. Henry Burbeck was nominated into the Connecticut Hall of Fame on February 24, 2016. It was Wyatt Kopp, a cousin of Lucy Rudd Burbeck, who nominated him back in 2013. He was finally accepted into the Hall of Fame in 2016. The Connecticut Hall of Fame is located at the Legislative Office Building in Hartford, Connecticut which is directly linked to the state capital building. The ceremony for his induction into the Connecticut Hall of Fame was held on March 7, 2016, at the Legislative Office Building.

== Dates of rank ==
=== Continental Army ===
- First Lieutenant, Gridley's Artillery Regiment - 19 May 1775
- First Lieutenant, Knox's Artillery Regiment - 17 November 1775
- Captain Lieutenant, 3rd Continental Artillery Regiment - 1 January 1777
- Captain, 3rd Continental Artillery Regiment - 12 September 1777
- Captain, Corps of Artillery - 17 June 1783
- Brevet Major, Continental Army - 30 September 1783
- Discharged - 3 November 1783

=== United States Army ===
- Captain, 3rd Company of Artillery - 20 October 1786
- Major, Battalion of Artillery - 4 November 1791
- Major, Corps of Artillerists and Engineers - 9 May 1794
- Lieutenant Colonel, Corps of Artillerists and Engineers - 7 May 1798
- Colonel, Regiment of Artillerists - 1 April 1802
- Brevet Brigadier General - 10 July 1812
- Retired - 15 June 1815

Military offices
Preceded by Lieutenant Colonel Stephen Rochefontaine	Commandant of the Corps of Artillerists and Engineers; 1798 – 1802	Office abolished
