= Spring Point Ledge Light =

Lighthouse in Maine, US

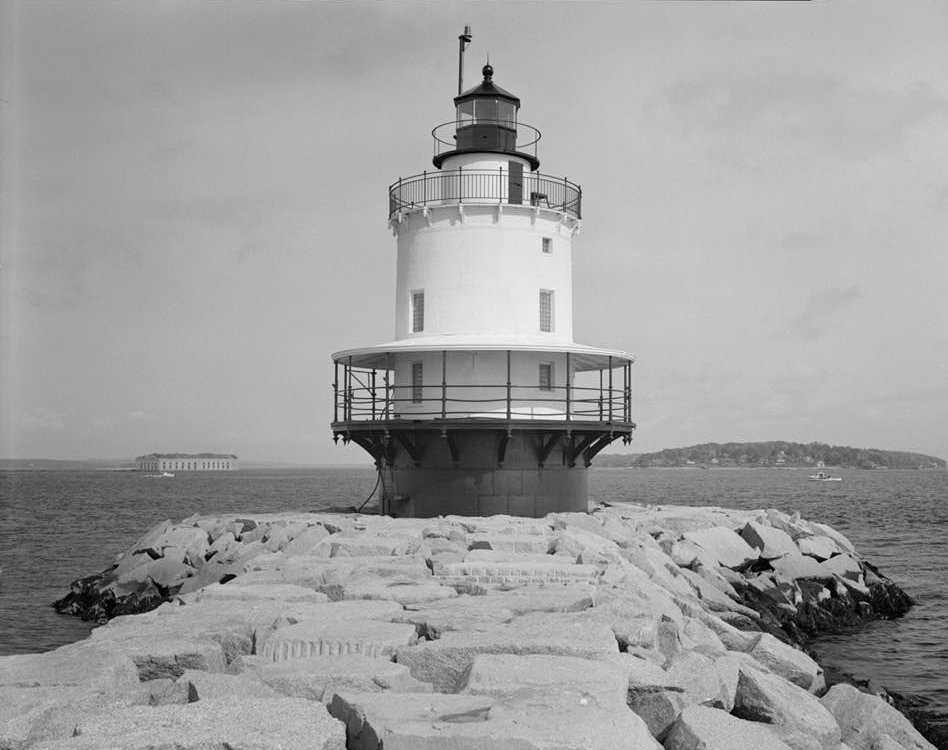
- Location: Spring Point Ledge, Portland Harbor, South Portland, Maine
- Coordinates: 43°39′07.61″N 70°13′26.06″W

Tower
- Constructed: 1897 (129 years ago)
- Foundation: Brick/Iron caisson
- Construction: Cast iron with brick
- Automated: 1960
- Shape: Conical "Spark Plug"
- Markings: White on black pier with black lantern
- Heritage: National Register of Historic Places listed place
- Fog signal: HORN: 1 every 10s

Light
- First lit: 1897
- Focal height: 54 feet (16 m)
- Lens: Fifth order Fresnel lens
- Range: White 12 nautical miles (22 km; 14 mi), Red 10 nautical miles (19 km; 12 mi)
- Characteristic: Flashing white 6s with two red sectors.
- Spring Point Ledge Light Station
- U.S. National Register of Historic Places
- Architect: US Army Corps of Engineers
- MPS: Light Stations of Maine MPS
- NRHP reference No.: 87002279
- Added to NRHP: January 21, 1988

Spring Point Ledge Light is a sparkplug lighthouse in South Portland, Maine, which marks a dangerous obstruction on the west side of the main shipping channel into Portland Harbor. It is now adjacent to the campus of Southern Maine Community College. It was constructed in 1897 and automated in 1960.

== History ==
The lighthouse was constructed in 1897 by the government after seven steamship companies stated that many of their vessels ran aground on Spring Point Ledge. Congress initially allocated $20,000 to its construction, although the total cost of the tower ended up being $45,000 due to problems with storms and poor-quality cement. The lighthouse featured a fog bell that sounded twice every twelve seconds, and a lantern fitted with a fifth-order Fresnel lens first lit by keeper William A. Lane on May 24, 1897.

Improvements were made to the lighthouse throughout the 20th century. It was electrified in 1934, and in 1951, a 900-foot breakwater, made from 50,000 short tons (45,000 t) of granite, was constructed in order to connect the lighthouse to the mainland. The lighthouse was originally owned and operated by the United States Coast Guard (USCG); however, on April 28, 1998, the Maine Lights Selection Committee approved a transfer of ownership of the tower to the Spring Point Ledge Light Trust, with the USCG retaining only the light and fog signal. On May 22, 1999, Spring Point Ledge Light was opened to the public for the first time in its history. Adjacent to the lighthouse is Fort Preble, the Southern Maine Community College Campus, and a small gift shop.

It was added to the National Register of Historic Places as Spring Point Ledge Light Station on January 21, 1988.

== Gallery ==
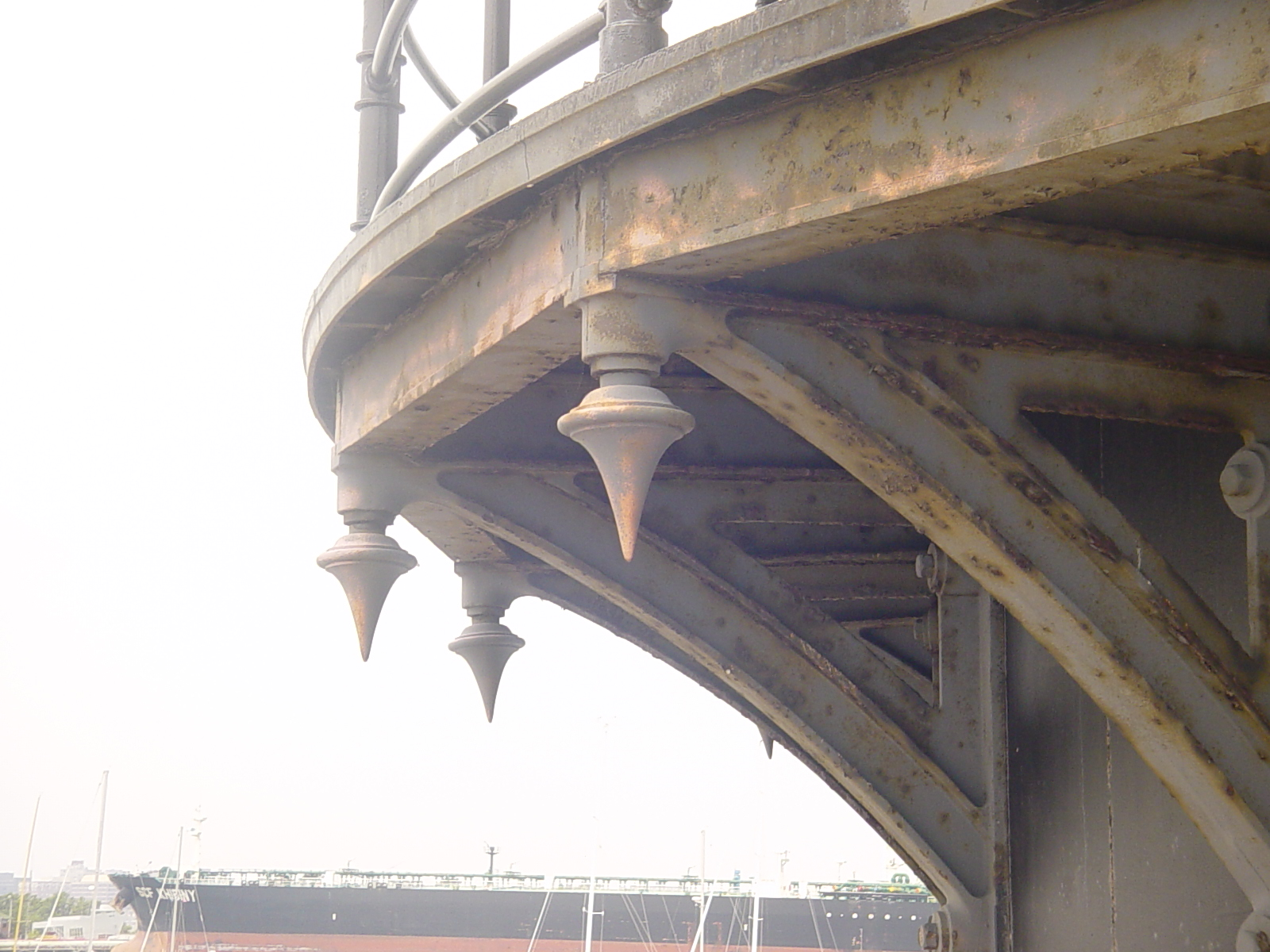
Spring Point Ledge Light ironwork detail

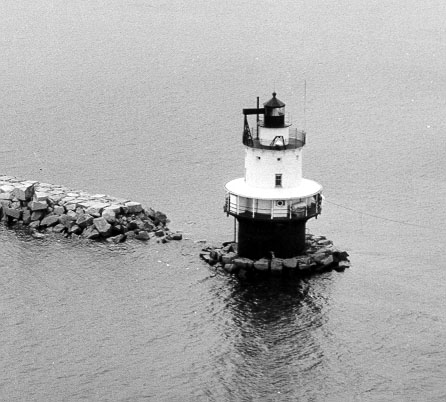
An aerial view from the USCG

== See also ==
- National Register of Historic Places listings in Cumberland County, Maine
