= Early U.S. Artillery formations =

- Active: September 29, 1789–May 12, 1814
- Country: United States
- Branch: United States Army
- Type: Artillery
- Size: Various

In the early years of the Republic, the United States Army experimented with a number of different artillery formations. For a time, the Artillery Branch and Engineer Branch were combined. Unit designations did not yet contain the terms "Field Artillery" or "Coast Artillery," although units so designated, as well those of the air defense artillery, would eventually trace their lineage and honors to some of the early formations.

== Battalion of Artillery (1784-1792) ==
The Battalion of Artillery consisted of four companies. The first company of the battalion was retained from the Continental Army. A second company, commanded by Captain Thomas Douglass, had been raised in Pennsylvania in 1784. Two other companies, commanded by captains Henry Burbeck and Joseph Savage, were raised as a result of congressional action in 1786 to deal with Shays's Rebellion. The battalion was organized on September 29, 1789; the commander of the first company, Captain John Doughty, was promoted to major and assigned as the commandant of the battalion; the companies were identified by the names of their commanders: Captains James Bradford, Henry Burbeck, William Ferguson, and Joseph Savage. Doughty served as commandant from September 29, 1789 to March 4, 1791 and the battalion was recognized as a part of the United States Army. William Ferguson succeeded Doughty as commandant (serving from March 4, 1791 to November 4, 1791, when he was killed in action) and was himself succeeded by Henry Burbeck (serving from November 4, 1791 to May 9, 1794).

== Legion of the United States (1792-1794) ==
In 1792, during Henry Burbeck's tenure as commandant, the Army was organized into the Legion of the United States. One artillery company was assigned to each of the four sublegions of the Legion of the United States. The Artillery Battalion no longer existed. (Burbeck is listed as a member of the Legion's artillery, but without any indication of his duty position.) Captains of the Legion's artillery companies were Mahlon Ford (1st Sublegion), John Pierce (2nd Sublegion), Moses Porter (3rd Sublegion), and Daniel McLane (4th Sublegion).

== Artillerists and Engineers (1794-1802) ==
=== Corps of Artillerists and Engineers ===
On May 9, 1794, the companies that had been the Battalion of Artillery was merged into the Corps of Artillerists and Engineers. In January 1794, Congress appointed a committee to investigate the needs for coastal defenses. The act of May 9, 1794 recognized the need to defend the coast lines of the United States. The Corps of Artillerists and Engineers was established by including the existing Battalion of Artillery into a larger organization of four battalions, each having four companies. The original act established the Corps for three years; an act of March 3, 1795 continued the Corps indefinitely. The resulting organization of forts and units is known as the First System. Leadership of the Corps was placed upon two lieutenant colonels—commandant: Stephen Rochefontaine (serving from February 26, 1795 to May 7, 1798) and Henry Burbeck (serving from May 7, 1798 to April 1, 1802). On March 3, 1799 the Corps was designated as the First Regiment of Artillerists and Engineers. On April 1, 1802, the First Regiment was combined with the Second Regiment to form the Regiment of Artillerists

=== Regiment of Artillerists and Engineers ===
Because of increased tensions with France, an additional unit, the Regiment of Artillerists and Engineers, was formed on April 27, 1798. When the regiment was first organized, it had three battalions, each of four companies. An additional artillery battalion was authorized on March 3, 1799. Concurrent with the increase in strength, the regiment was designated as the Second Regiment of Artillerists and Engineers and the Corps of Artillerists and Engineers was redesignated as the First Regiment of Artillerists and Engineers. The regiment had two lieutenant colonels—commandant: John Doughty (serving from June 1, 1798 to May 26, 1800) and Louis Toussard (serving from May 26, 1800 to April 1, 1802). On April 1, 1802, the Second Regiment was combined with the First Regiment to form the Regiment of Artillerists

== Regiment of Artillerists (1802-1814) ==
The assets of the First and Second Regiments of Artillerists and Engineers were combined to form the Regiment of Artillerists, without reference to engineers; it consisted of five battalions of four companies each. Colonel Henry Burbeck was the only commander of the regiment from its activation on April 1, 1802 until inactivation on May 12, 1814. On January 11, 1812, two additional artillery regiments, the Second and Third, were created and the Regiment of Artillerists was re-designated as the First Regiment of Artillery. Each of the three artillery regiments had a total of 20 artillery companies for a total of 60 companies. On May 12, 1814 the three artillery regiments were consolidated into the Corps of Artillery with the total number of artillery companies reduced to 48.

== Regiment of Light Artillery (1808-1821) ==
The act of April 12, 1808 provided for a Regiment of Light Artillery consisting of ten companies. Moses Porter served as the only colonel of the regiment from March 12, 1812 to June 1, 1821. Prior to the war of 1812, only one company was equipped as field artillery. It was mounted as such in 1808 and dis-mounted in 1809. During the war of 1812, other companies were equipped as horse artillery or as field artillery. On May 17, 1815, under the act of March 3, 1815, the 15th, 26th, 30th, 31st, 34th, and 45th regiments of infantry were consolidated with the Regiment of Light Artillery. On June 1, 1821, as provided by the act of March 2, 1821, this organization, along with the Corps of Artillery, was inactivated and its components distributed to the 1st, 2nd, 3rd, and 4th Regiments of artillery.

== Corps of Artillery (1814-1821) ==
The Corps of Artillery was formed on May 12, 1814 (under the act of March 30, 1814) by consolidating the 1st, 2nd, and 3rd Regiments of Artillery. Its structure was defined as 12 battalions, each with four companies. On May 17, 1815 (under the act of March 3, 1815) under the military peace establishment, the Regiment of Dragoons and the 41st, 42nd, and 43rd Regiments of Infantry were consolidated with the Corps of Artillery, giving it a strength of eight battalions, each with four companies for a total of 32 artillery companies. On June 1, 1821 (under the act of March 2, 1821) the Corps of Artillery ceased to exist. Assets of the Corps of Artillery and the Regiment of Light Artillery formed the 1st, 2nd, 3rd, and 4th Regiments of Artillery.

== Legacy ==
- The 4th Battalion, 1st Field Artillery Regiment traces it lineage to Captain Moses Porter’s Company of Artillery of the 3d Sublegion, Legion of the United States.
- The 5th Battalion, 1st Field Artillery Regiment traces its lineage to Benjamin Ogden’s Company, 3d Regiment of Artillery.
- The 1st Battalion, 3rd Field Artillery Regiment traces its lineage to the 2d Company, 2d Battalion, Corps of Artillerists and Engineers.
- The 2nd Battalion, 3rd Field Artillery Regiment traces its lineage to the Captain Sanders Donoho’s Company, 2nd Regiment of Artillery.
- The 5th Battalion, 3rd Field Artillery Regiment traces its lineage to Captain William McRea’s Company, 2d Regiment of Artillerists and Engineers.
- The 1st Battalion, 5th Field Artillery Regiment traces its lineage to the 1st (Captain Savage's) Company, Battalion of Artillery.
- The 1st Battalion, 6th Field Artillery Regiment traces its lineage to Captain James Stille’s Company, 3d Battalion, 2d Regiment of Artillerists and Engineers.
- The 1st Battalion, 4th Air Defense Artillery Regiment traces its lineage to Captain Burbeck's Company, Battalion of Artillery.
- The 1st Battalion, 2nd Air Defense Artillery Regiment traces its lineage to Captain John Henry's Company, 2nd Regiment of Artillerists and Engineers.
- The 2nd Battalion, 2nd Air Defense Artillery Regiment traces its lineage to Captain Peter's Company, Regiment of Light Artillery.

== External ==
- Papers of the War Department
- The Origins of the Legion of the United States
