= John Crane (soldier) =

John Crane (December 7, 1744 – August 21, 1805) was a participant in the Boston Tea Party and a soldier during the American Revolutionary War.

== Biography ==
=== Early life ===
Crane, son of Abijah & Sarah (Beverly) Crane, was born December 7, 1744, in Braintree, Massachusetts. He served in the French and Indian War as a substitute for his father, who had been drafted. After the war he became a housewright. He married Mehitable Wheeler on December 16, 1766.

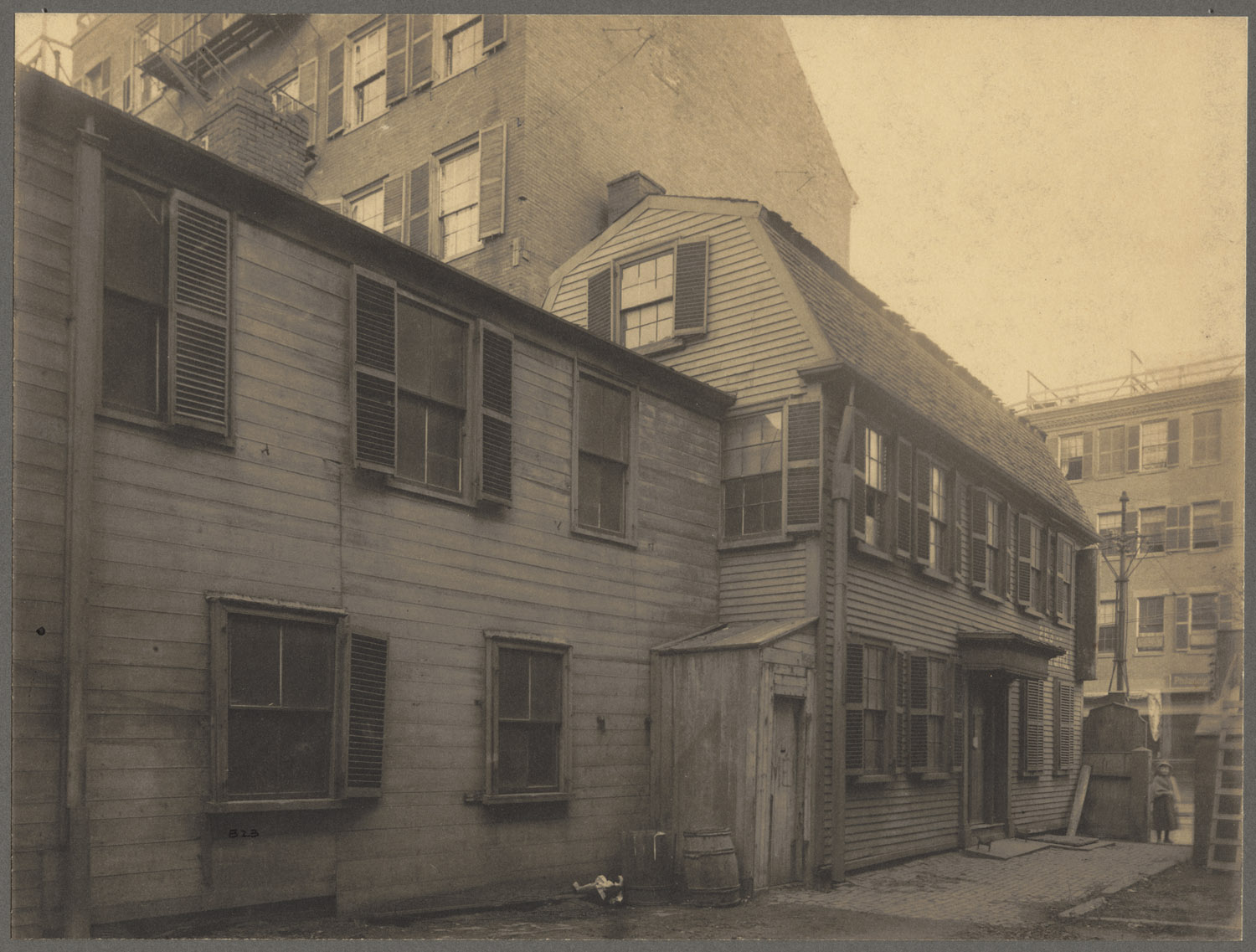
Crane House, Tremont Street, Boston. ca.1898

=== Revolutionary War service ===
Early in the American Revolutionary movement Crane became active in the Sons of Liberty. Before the Boston Tea Party, Crane and the other participants met at his shop to disguise themselves as American Indians. At the harbor, Crane was in the hold of a ship when he was knocked unconscious by a crate of tea that fell on him. Taking him for dead, his companions hid him under a pile of wood shavings in a carpenter's shop near the wharf, but upon their return later that day, they found he was very much alive. He recovered, though allegedly, he never remembered the events of that infamous night.

Crane moved to Providence, Rhode Island, in 1774 because the Boston Port Bill harmed his business. Soon after, he was commissioned as a major in the United Train of Artillery (UTA) of the Rhode Island Militia.

After war began at the battles of Lexington and Concord in April 1775, he joined the siege of Boston as captain of the artillery company from Rhode Island, which was part of Gridley's Regiment of Massachusetts Artillery and saw action at the Battle of Bunker Hill in June 1775.

On December 10, 1775, he was commissioned in the Continental Army as the major of the artillery regiment commanded by Colonel Henry Knox. On September 14, 1776, he was wounded in action at Corlaer's Hook. On January 1, 1777, Crane was promoted to colonel and given command of the 3rd Continental Artillery Regiment. He served in that position for the duration of the war, and his regiment saw much action.

In June 1783 Crane was appointed commander of the newly formed Corps of Artillery, succeeding Knox as the head of American artillery forces. He received a brevet promotion to brigadier general in September 1783, but he resigned from the army less than two months later.

Shortly thereafter, Crane was admitted as an Original Member of the Society of the Cincinnati in the state of Massachusetts.

=== Later life ===
After the war, Crane moved to Whiting, Maine, to settle on land granted to him by Massachusetts for his wartime service. In 1790 he was appointed a judge of the court of common pleas by Massachusetts governor John Hancock, and he served in this position for the rest of his life.

General Crane died on August 21, 1805, and was buried in the Whiting Village Cemetery in Whiting.

== Legacy ==
The Revolutionary War re-enactment unit of the Artillery Company of Newport is named Crane's Battery.
