= South Portland, Maine =

City in Maine, United States

- City
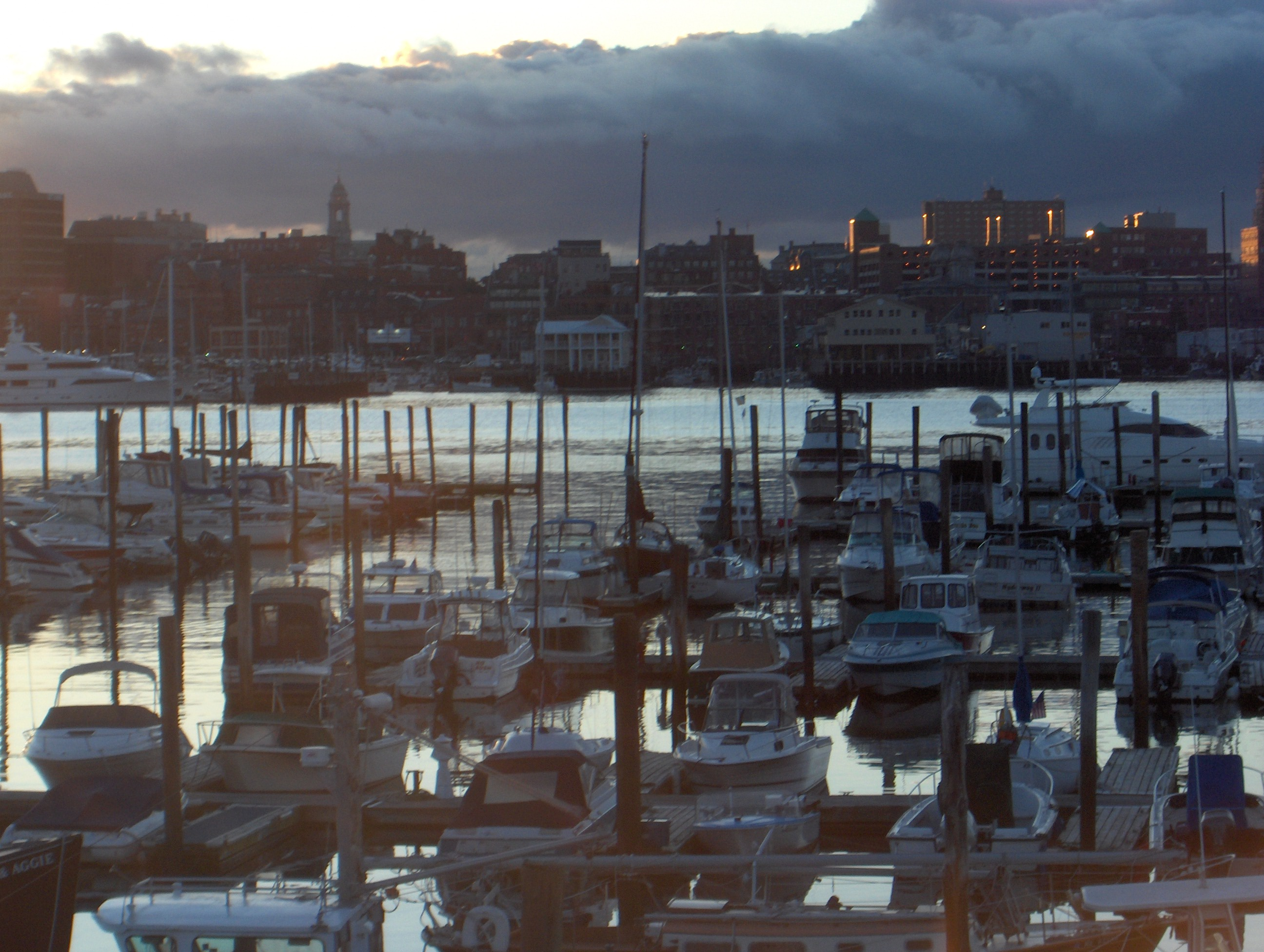
- A South Portland marina overlooking the city of Portland

- Seal Logo
- Nicknames: The Park City, SoPo
- Motto: Forward
- Location in Cumberland County and the state of Maine
- Coordinates: 43°37′44″N 70°16′12″W
- Country: United States
- State: Maine
- County: Cumberland
- Incorporated (town): March 15, 1895
- Incorporated (city): March 22, 1898

Government
  - Type: City Council and City Manager
  - City Manager: Scott Morelli
  - Mayor: Elyse Tipton

Area
  - Total: 14.01 sq mi (36.29 km^{2})
  - Land: 12.04 sq mi (31.19 km^{2})
  - Water: 1.97 sq mi (5.10 km^{2})
- Elevation: 59 ft (18 m)

Population (2020)
  - Total: 26,498
  - Density: 2,200.2/sq mi (849.49/km^{2})
- Time zone: UTC-5 (Eastern (EST))
  - Summer (DST): UTC-4 (EDT)
- ZIP Codes: 04106, 04116
- Area code: 207
- FIPS code: 23-76750
- GNIS feature ID: 582738
- Website: https://www.southportland.gov/

South Portland is a city in Cumberland County, Maine, United States, and is the fourth-most populous city in the state, incorporated in 1898. At the 2020 census, the city population was 26,498. Known for its working waterfront, South Portland is situated on Portland Harbor and overlooks the skyline of Portland and the islands of Casco Bay. Due to South Portland's close proximity to air, marine, rail, and highway transportation options, the city has become a center for retail and industry in the region. The Maine Mall, the largest shopping mall in the state, is located in South Portland. It is also a designated Tree City USA community.

Despite the name, South Portland was never part of the city of Portland, but rather part of Cape Elizabeth, separating in 1895. However, both Cape Elizabeth and Portland were once part of Falmouth. Cape Elizabeth, then including what later became South Portland, broke away from Falmouth in 1765. South Portland is a principal city of the Portland–South Portland–Biddeford metropolitan area.

== History ==
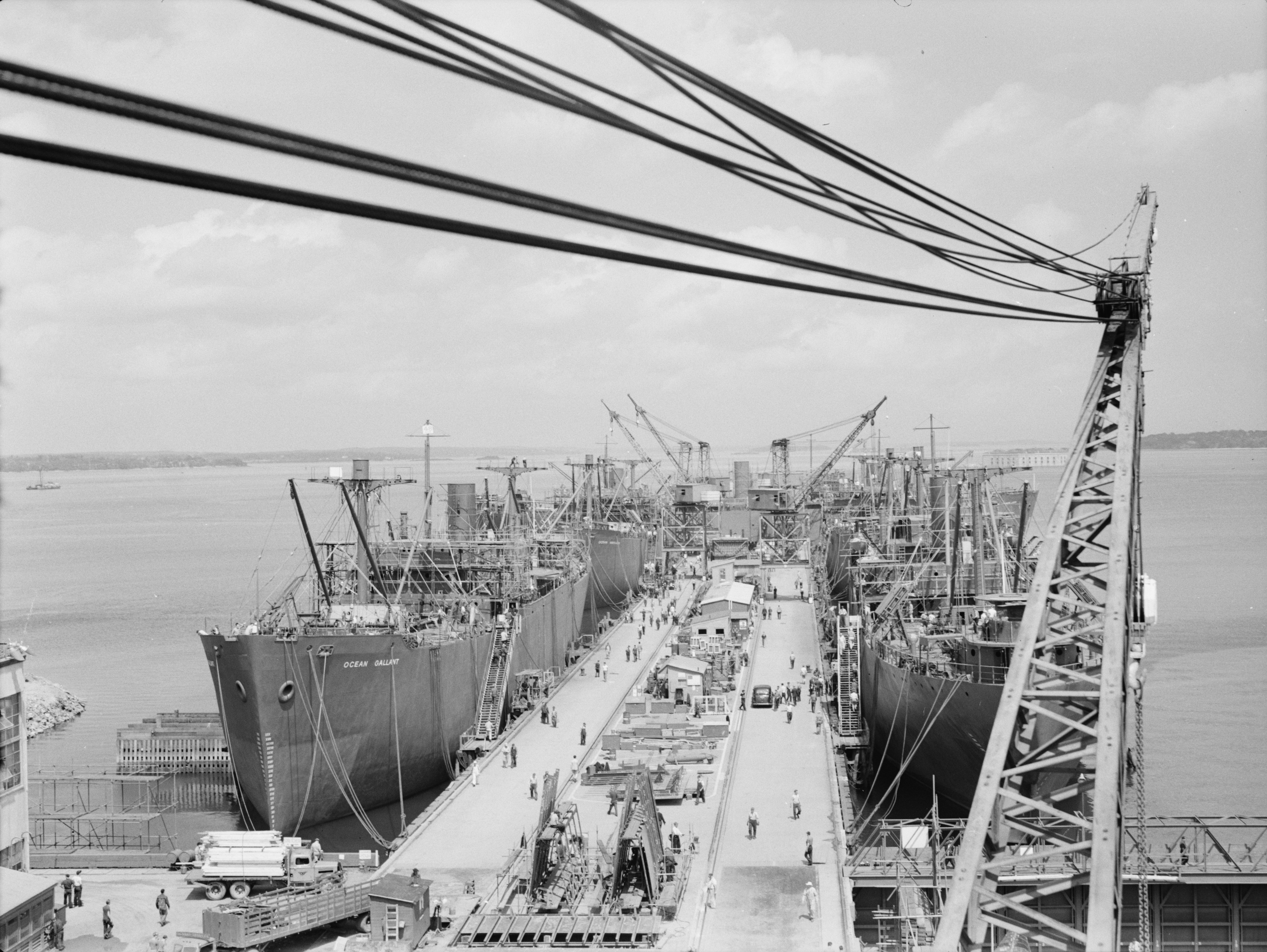
Liberty ships being built along the waterfront (August 1942)

South Portland was first colonized in 1630, and it grew to become a small residential community with many farms. The village was raided by natives in Father Rale's War (1724). In 1858, the City of Portland purchased land near the Fore River for the Forest City Cemetery. On March 15, 1895, it was incorporated as a town after it broke away from Cape Elizabeth, based on a disagreement on a future source of public drinking water. Three years later South Portland became a city, destined to receive its drinking water, like Portland, from Sebago Lake, while Cape Elizabeth used wells or other local sources.

On South Portland's waterfront is Fort Preble, which is a military fort established in 1808 to protect Portland Harbor. It was in operation during several American conflicts, including the United States Civil War, World War I, and World War II. Near Fort Preble is Spring Point Ledge Light, which was constructed by the federal government in 1897 to mark a dangerous rock ledge.

In December 1844, Portland resident Ellen G. White, who became a founder of the Seventh-day Adventist church, is said to have experienced her first vision during a prayer meeting at the home of Mrs. Haines at 60 Ocean Street, which later became the Griffin Club. The building was torn down in 2018.

In 1940, the Todd-Bath Iron Shipbuilding Corp (later called the "East Yard") was established to build cargo ships for Britain. When the United States became involved with World War II, the shipyard expanded to include the South Portland Shipbuilding Corp. (aka the "West Yard"), that later combined with the Todd-Bath yard to become the New England Shipbuilding Corporation. These shipyards built 236 of the 440 foot (134 m) long Liberty ships, more than 10 percent of all the Liberty ships constructed during the war years. At its peak, the shipyard employed some 30,000 people, including thousands of women, who took over the jobs vacated by men going into the service. The shipyard gradually ceased operations after the war ended in 1945. Remnants of the shipyards are visible, and there is a memorial to the shipyard and the workers at Bug Light Park. The park is also home to Portland Breakwater Lighthouse, commonly referred to as "Bug Light".

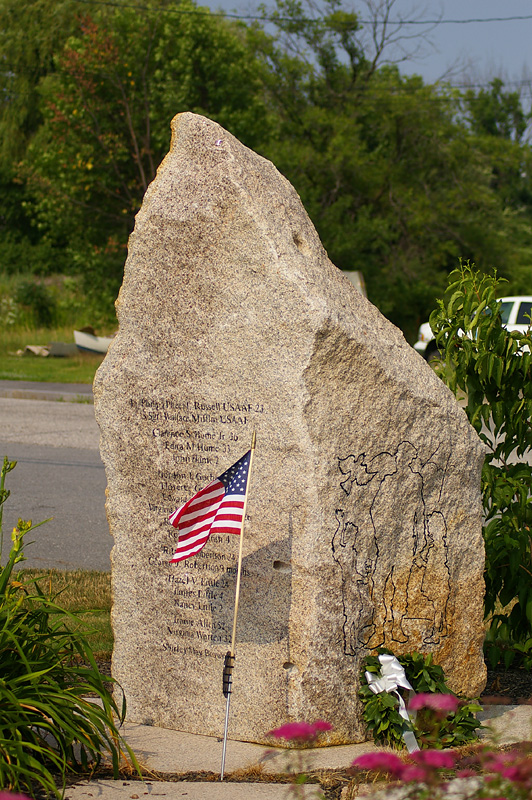
Long Creek Air Tragedy Memorial.

On July 11, 1944, at 4:45 p.m., U.S. Army Lt. Phillip "Phee" Russell was attempting to land his Douglas A-26 Invader at the Portland-Westbrook Municipal Airport. For reasons that were never fully determined, Russell lost control of the plane and crashed into a trailer park in South Portland's Brick Hill neighborhood. Nineteen people were killed and 20 people were injured—mostly the families of South Portland shipyard workers—making it the worst aviation accident in Maine history. A Long Creek Air Tragedy Memorial was eventually erected to commemorate the crash and honor the victims, but not until 66 years later.

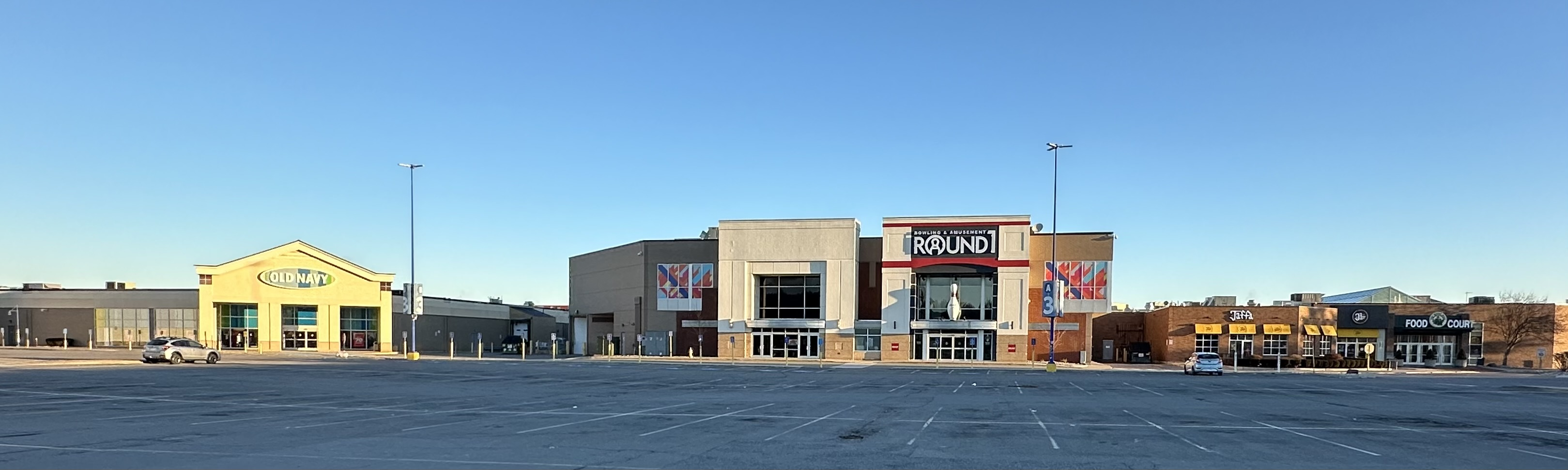
The Maine Mall circa 2023.

Over the last few decades, South Portland has become the retail capital of Maine. The Mill Creek shopping center, built in the 1950s, was the first such "strip mall" built in Maine: a line of stores under one long roof and a covered walkway. Mill Creek has changed and grown significantly since, but the original layout still forms the core of the stores. The area in Mill Creek known as the Waterfront Market sits at the base of the Casco Bay Bridge and attracts shoppers from Scarborough, Cape Elizabeth and Portland.

The need for a large mall in Maine emerged in the 1960s, as Portland's downtown district could not accommodate the growing retail market. A former pig farm in South Portland was chosen as the site for the project because it was close to I-95 and convenient from Portland. Beginning construction of the Maine Mall in the late 1960s marked the start of a major transition in the western part of South Portland: from a rural, agrarian landscape to the large retail center that exists today.

The oldest neighborhood in South Portland, and its former "retail corridor", is Ferry Village. Prior to the Casco Bay Bridge (or the one it replaced, the Million Dollar Bridge), ferries transported people and goods back and forth across the harbor to Portland. The landscape and the makeup of residents in Ferry Village were forever changed upon the close of the WWII shipyards. The Village has slowly bounced back and is now one of the more popular places in the city to live.

Ferry Village also has one of the most active and involved neighborhood associations in Southern Maine. The Ferry Village Neighborhood Conservation Association (FVNCA) was formed in August 1985 to address the development boom in the 1980s which was quickly altering the character of the waterfront and many Greater Portland neighborhoods. FVNCA was instrumental in the formation of the South Portland Land Trust as well as the City-managed Land Bank which provides seed money for the acquisition of available open space.

After decades of neglect, the westernmost neighborhoods of South Portland, including Redbank and Brick Hill, experienced new growth and revitalization in 2006 with the redevelopment of land formerly belonging to Long Creek Youth Development Center as a mixed-use neighborhood featuring affordable housing, market rate housing, professional offices and outdoor recreational spaces. The redevelopment of the Brick Hill site spurred additional private development nearby in the form of market rate housing, retail and light industry. The city's 2017 West End Master Plan aims to further encourage such development in that area of the city.

South Portland was voted one of the best places to live in Maine in 2018.

== Government and politics ==
South Portland has a council-manager form of government.

The city council is made up of seven members elected by the citizens: one member from each of the five districts in the city, and two at-large members. Voters are allowed to vote for council candidates in all five districts, not just the district where they are registered to vote.

Every December, the members of the council elect one of themselves as mayor, which is primarily a ceremonial title. The mayor serves as chairman of the council.

The city council is responsible for establishing policy, passing local ordinances, voting appropriations, and developing an overall vision for the city.

The council appoints a city manager to oversee the daily operations of the government and implement the policies established by the council. The manager is an employee of the city and has a contract that specifies his or her duties and responsibilities. Ideally, the manager is considered apolitical.

=== Elections ===
Voter registration

Voter Registration and Party Enrollment as of March 2024
Party	Total Voters	Percentage
Democratic	10,063	53.29%
Unenrolled	4,960	26.27%
Republican	2,852	15.10%
Green Independent	709	3.75%
No Labels	227	1.20%
Libertarian	71	0.38%
Total	18,882	100.00%

=== Mayoral controversy ===
In December 2007, then-mayor James Soule made headlines in Maine and across the country when he proposed in his inaugural address that South Portland, along with parts of southern Maine, secede from the state of Maine and form a new state. Soule referred to the state government of Maine as an "oppressive enemy" and said that South Portland, along with other southern Maine cities and towns, contributes much more to the state in tax revenue than it receives in education funding. "The state of Maine needs South Portland more than South Portland needs the state of Maine," Soule claimed.

Soule's proposal was panned by the congressional delegation and by Governor Baldacci, whose spokesman called it "silly" and "counterproductive."

The proposal did not gain any traction, and Soule did not continue to pursue it. Soule nominated himself for reelection as mayor in November 2008, but was defeated by Thomas Blake in a 6–1 vote. Soule voted for himself.

== Geography ==
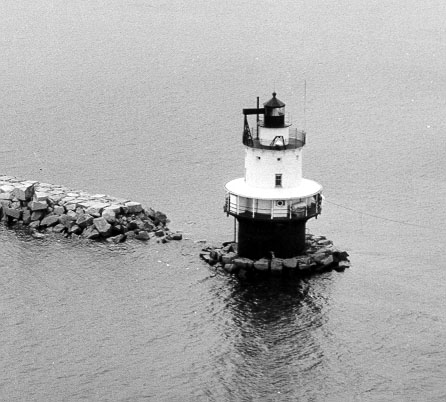
Spring Point Ledge Light breakwater under construction (1951)

South Portland is bordered by Portland to the north, Cape Elizabeth and Scarborough to the south, and Westbrook to the west. According to the United States Census Bureau, the city has a total area of 14.02 square miles (36.31 km^{2}), of which 11.99 square miles (31.05 km^{2}) is land and 2.03 square miles (5.26 km^{2}) is water.

=== Villages and neighborhoods ===
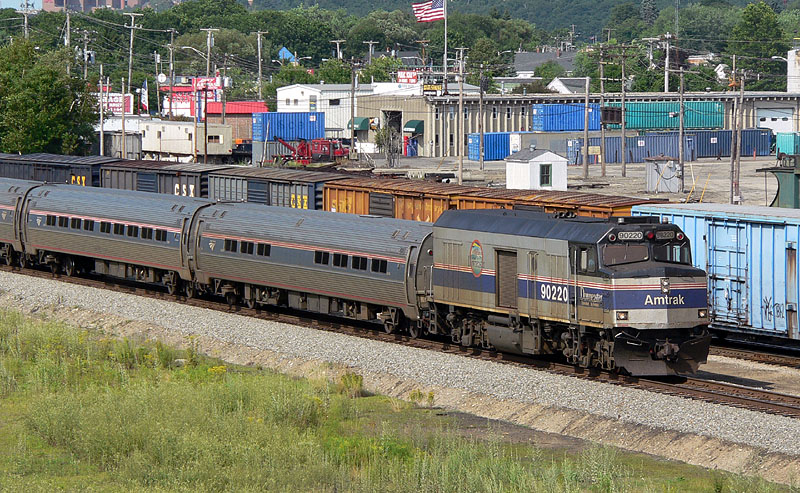
A Downeaster passenger train and a Pan Am Railways freight train at Rigby Yard in South Portland, 2005.

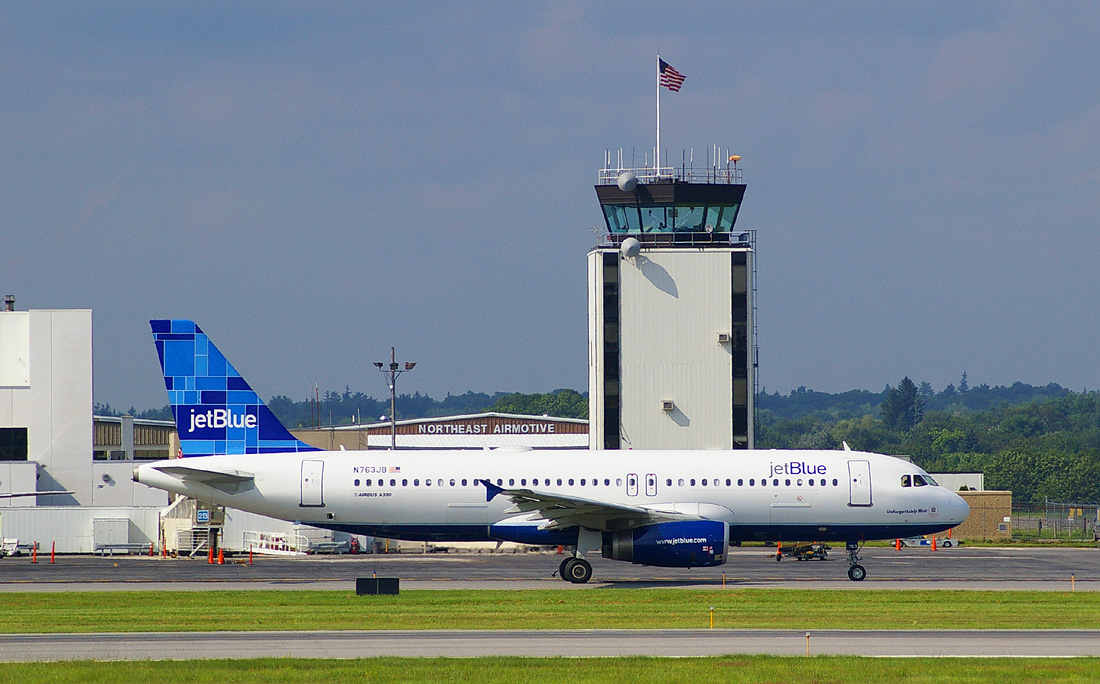
jetBlue airliner at PWM, viewed from the South Portland side of the runway, 2009.

As defined by the city's Planning Department in a 2018 neighborhood map, South Portland comprises the following districts that could be described in some cases as urban or suburban villages, listed below in bold; historic neighborhoods are in italics.

- **Ferry Village**
  - Cushing's Point
- **Knightville**
  - Mill Creek
- **Ligonia**
- **Pleasantdale**
  - Highland Avenue / Stanwood Park
- **Skunk Hill**
  - Brick Hill
  - Cash Corner
  - Country Gardens
  - The Maine Mall
  - Meadowbrook
  - Redbank
  - Sunset Park
  - Thornton Heights
- **Town House Corner**
  - South Portland Heights
- **Willard**
  - Loveitt's Field
  - Meetinghouse Hill
  - Willard Beach

== Education ==
South Portland's public school system has five neighborhood elementary schools: Brown School, Dyer School, Kaler School, Skillin School and Dora L. Small Elementary School. The city has one middle school, South Portland Middle School, which has grades 5–8. The city has one high school, South Portland High School, which has an enrollment of about 900 students.

South Portland has two private schools: Holy Cross School, which is a Roman Catholic K–8 school, and Greater Portland Christian School, which is a non-denominational Christian K–12 school.

South Portland also boasts three institutions of higher learning: Kaplan University, New England Bible College, and Southern Maine Community College.

== Places of worship ==
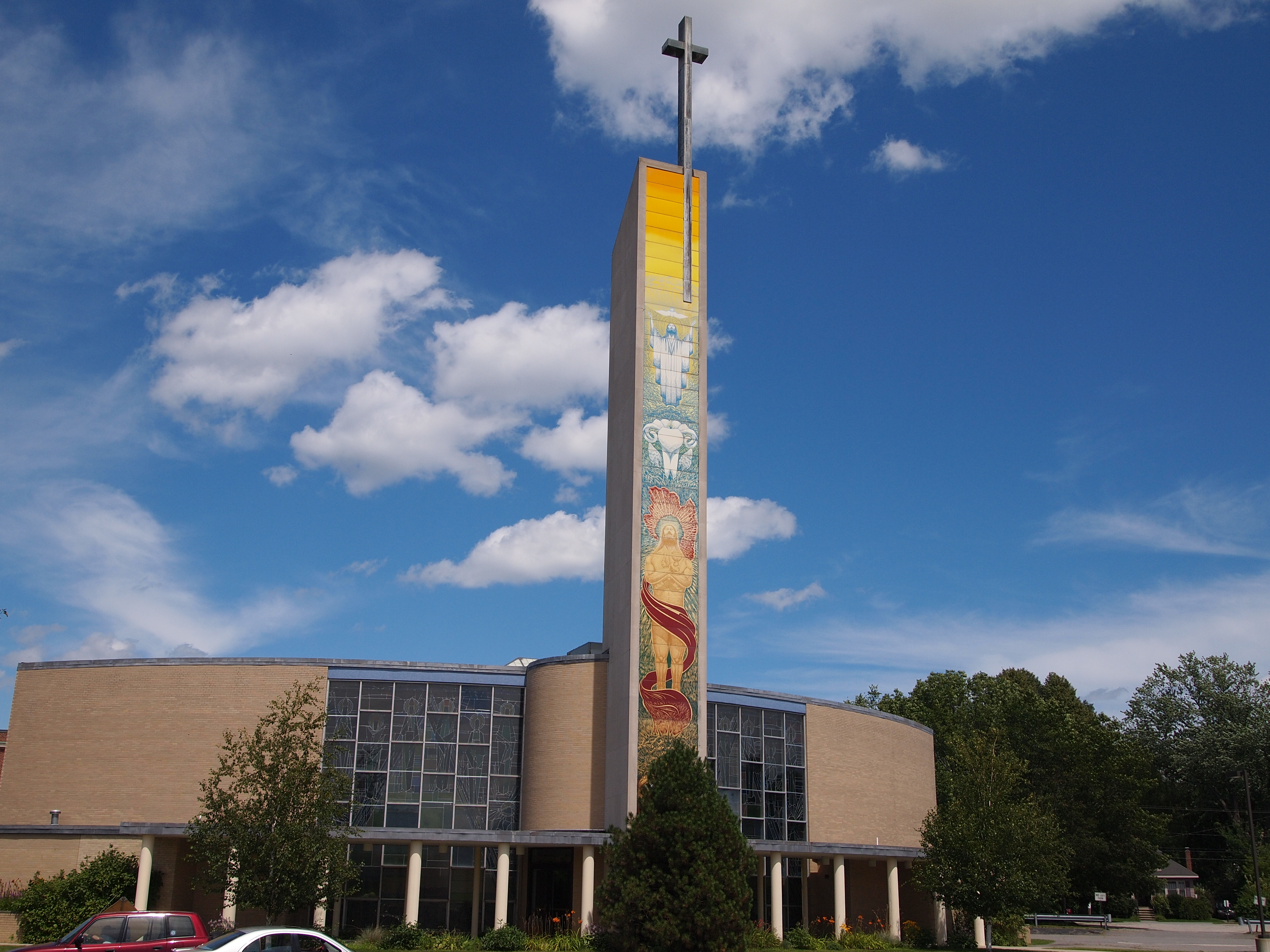
Holy Cross Church

Christian churches in the area include the First Baptist Church of South Portland (Baptist), Holy Cross Church (Roman Catholic), Peoples United Methodist Church and Thornton Heights United Methodist Church (Methodist), South Portland Church of the Nazarene (Nazarene), First Congregational Church of South Portland (United Church of Christ), Christ Fellowship Church, Eastpoint Christian Church and Greater Portland Church of Christ (Christian, nondenominational).

There is also a Buddhist Peace Center, and a Reform Judaism congregation locally.

== Media ==
There are several local media groups that report on the news of the city. The South Portland Sentry offers a free newspaper that covers the city's events and news. It has a circulation of 17,000 and is distributed to residents free of charge. Regional newspapers such as The Current and The Forecaster cover South Portland issues and events, while also serving the communities of Cape Elizabeth and Scarborough. The city also has a local Public-access television cable TV television station, SPC-TV which is sponsored by the city and is broadcast on Time Warner Cable's channel 2 and 3.

Media coverage for South Portland is also provided by Portland's television stations, radio stations, and periodicals.

== Economy ==
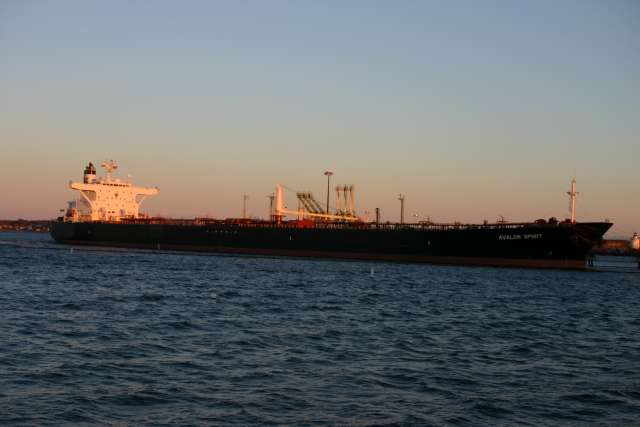
An oil tanker delivering oil to the Portland Pipeline.

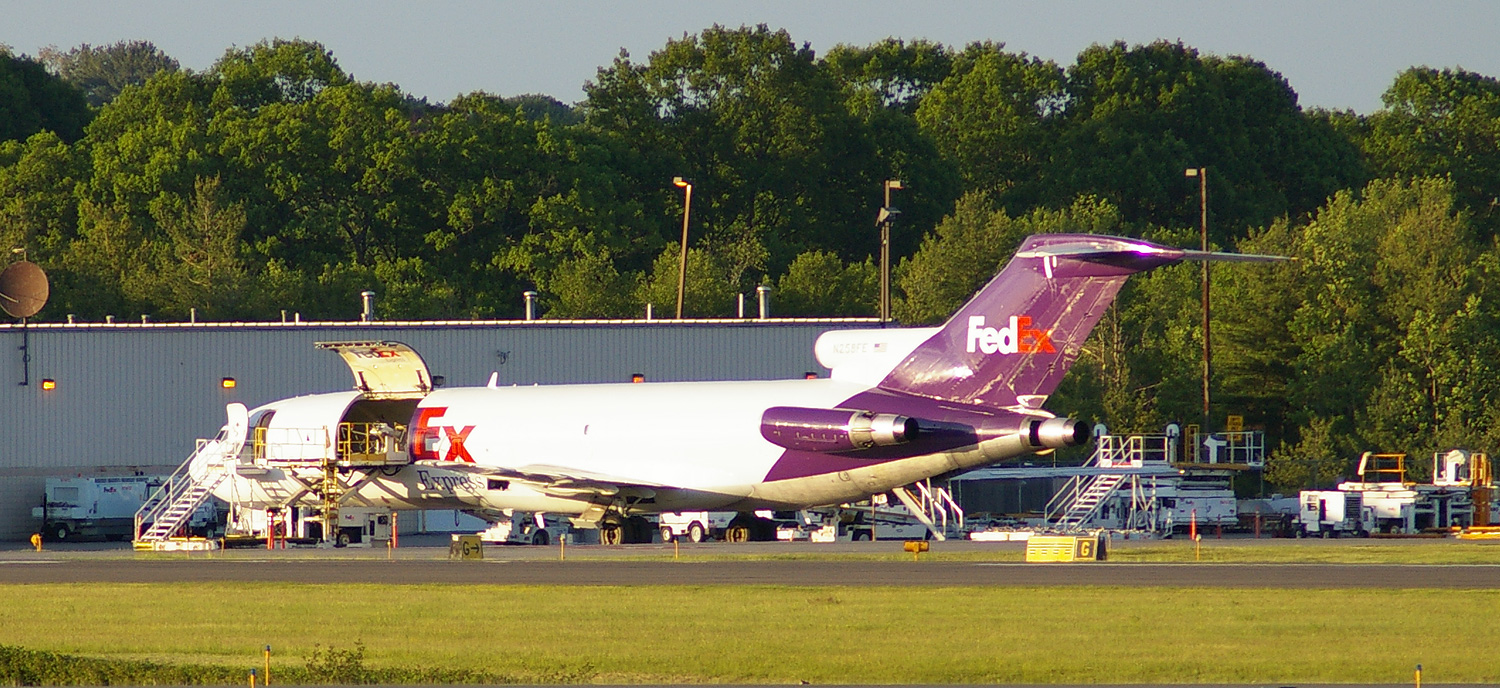
A FedEx Express cargo jet at PWM, viewed from the South Portland side of the runway, 2009.

While the city is considered suburban, it also has a diverse economy, as evidenced by its working waterfront and large retail center.

Home to the Portland-Montreal Pipe Line, millions of barrels of oil are shipped to South Portland each year, which is a major portion of the inbound tonnage entering the Port of Portland. It is the northernmost oil port in the United States, and has over 120 oil storage tanks. Tank farm emissions such as benzene and Naphthalene have been a concern, and sea level rise projections show a 27% chance that the South Portland Terminal will flood by 2050.

Rigby Yard, the largest railroad yard in New England, built by Portland Terminal Company in 1922, is still in operation today and is part of the Pan Am Railways system.

The city is also home to manufacturing facilities for the technology companies Diodes Incorporated (formerly onsemi/Fairchild Semiconductor),and Texas Instruments (formerly National Semiconductor).

The Maine Mall is the largest and busiest mall in the state and attracts thousands of shoppers each year.

The main runway of Maine's busiest airport, the Portland International Jetport, is located within the city of South Portland. The passenger terminal is located within the city of Portland.

== Transportation ==
The city-owned South Portland Bus Service provides public transportation throughout the city.

== Points of interest ==
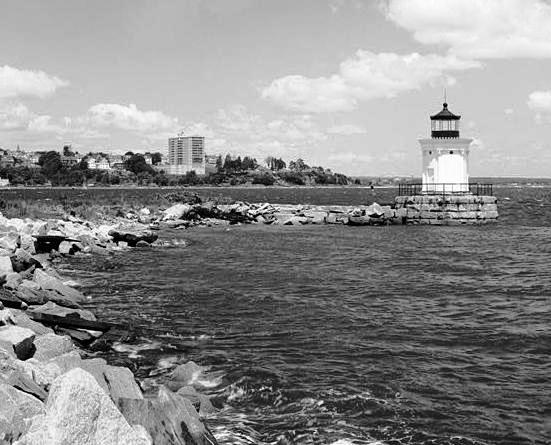
"Bug Light" with Portland's Eastern Promenade in the background.

South Portland has a number of parks and open spaces. One of the main features of South Portland is the historic Greenbelt walkway, which is a three-mile (5 km) paved trail that crosses through several neighborhoods and provides views of the harbor. Mill Creek Park is located in South Portland's downtown area and has landscaped pond area and rose garden. The park hosts several local events, including summer concerts, Art in the Park, holiday tree lighting and ice skating in the winter. Other local parks include Wainwright Farm, which is a recreational facility and Hinckley Park which is a 40-acre (160,000 m^{2}) wooded area that has two ponds. The city's waterfront has several recreational marinas and is home to the last free beach in the area, Willard Beach.

Other attractions:

- Calvary Cemetery
- Fort Preble
- The Maine Mall
- Portland Breakwater Light (known locally as Bug Light)
- Shoreway Arboretum
- South Portland Armory
- South Portland Historical Society
- South Portland Municipal Golf Course
- South Portland Public Library
- Southern Maine Community College
- Spring Point Ledge Light

== Demographics ==
Historical population
Census	Pop.	Note	%±
1900	6,287		—
1910	7,471		18.8%
1920	9,254		23.9%
1930	13,840		49.6%
1940	15,781		14.0%
1950	21,866		38.6%
1960	22,788		4.2%
1970	23,267		2.1%
1980	22,712		−2.4%
1990	23,163		2.0%
2000	23,324		0.7%
2010	25,002		7.2%
2020	26,498		6.0%
2022 (est.)	27,026		2.0%

=== 2020 census ===
As of the 2020 census, South Portland had a population of 26,498. The median age was 40.6 years. 17.6% of residents were under the age of 18 and 18.7% of residents were 65 years of age or older. For every 100 females there were 90.2 males, and for every 100 females age 18 and over there were 86.7 males age 18 and over.

100.0% of residents lived in urban areas, while 0.0% lived in rural areas.

There were 11,793 households in South Portland, of which 23.5% had children under the age of 18 living in them. Of all households, 39.3% were married-couple households, 18.7% were households with a male householder and no spouse or partner present, and 32.7% were households with a female householder and no spouse or partner present. About 33.7% of all households were made up of individuals and 14.7% had someone living alone who was 65 years of age or older.

There were 12,415 housing units, of which 5.0% were vacant. The homeowner vacancy rate was 0.6% and the rental vacancy rate was 4.5%.

Racial composition as of the 2020 census
Race	Number	Percent
White	22,219	83.9%
Black or African American	1,559	5.9%
American Indian and Alaska Native	103	0.4%
Asian	906	3.4%
Native Hawaiian and Other Pacific Islander	16	0.1%
Some other race	373	1.4%
Two or more races	1,322	5.0%
Hispanic or Latino (of any race)	908	3.4%

=== 2010 census ===
As of the census of 2010, there were 25,002 people, 10,877 households, and 6,197 families residing in the city. The population density was 2,085.2 inhabitants per square mile (805.1/km^{2}). There were 11,484 housing units at an average density of 957.8 per square mile (369.8/km^{2}). The racial makeup of the city was 91.1% White, 2.1% African American, 0.3% Native American, 3.8% Asian, 0.8% from other races, and 2.0% from two or more races. Hispanic or Latino of any race were 2.2% of the population.

There were 10,877 households, of which 27.6% had children under the age of 18 living with them, 40.6% were married couples living together, 12.0% had a female householder with no husband present, 4.4% had a male householder with no wife present, and 43.0% were non-families. Of all households, 31.9% were made up of individuals, and 11.1% had someone living alone who was 65 years of age or older. The average household size was 2.24 and the average family size was 2.84.

The median age in the city was 39.4 years. 20.4% of residents were under the age of 18; 9.7% were between the ages of 18 and 24; 28.4% were from 25 to 44; 27.8% were from 45 to 64; and 13.6% were 65 years of age or older. The gender makeup of the city was 47.7% male and 52.3% female.

=== 2000 census ===
As of the census of 2000, there were 23,324 people, 10,047 households, and 6,038 families residing in the city. The population density was 1,944.7 inhabitants per square mile (750.9/km^{2}). There were 10,349 housing units at an average density of 862.9 per square mile (333.2/km^{2}). The racial makeup of the city was 95.80% White, 0.63% African American, 0.33% Native American, 1.59% Asian, 0.03% Pacific Islander, 0.31% from other races, and 1.31% from two or more races. Hispanic or Latino of any race were 1.13% of the population.

There were 10,047 households, out of which 27.6% had children under the age of 18 living with them, 45.1% were married couples living together, 11.4% had a female householder with no husband present, and 39.9% were non-families. Of all households, 30.7% were made up of individuals, and 12.4% had someone living alone who was 65 years of age or older. The average household size was 2.27 and the average family size was 2.85.

In the city, the population was spread out, with 22.3% under the age of 18, 7.7% from 18 to 24, 32.2% from 25 to 44, 23.1% from 45 to 64, and 14.6% who were 65 years of age or older. The median age was 38 years. For every 100 females, there were 89.5 males. For every 100 females age 18 and over, there were 84.3 males.

The median income for a household in the city was $42,770, and the median income for a family was $52,833. Males had a median income of $32,256 versus $28,630 for females. The per capita income for the city was $22,781. About 4.9% of families and 6.7% of the population were below the poverty line, including 7.5% of those under age 18 and 7.2% of those age 65 or over.

== Notable people ==
- Robert G. Albion, author, historian, college professor
- Kristin Barry, distance runner
- Jim Beattie, baseball pitcher
- Larry Bliss, state senator
- Lynn Bromley, state senator and Small Business Administration official
- Brett Brown, basketball coach
- Peter Buck, co-founder of Subway restaurant chain
- Clarke Canfield, journalist, author
- Frank M. Coffin, judge, U.S. congressman
- Chris Coyne, co-founder of OkCupid
- Bob Crowley, winner of Survivor: Gabon
- Santo DiPietro, businessperson, city councilor and state legislator
- Jane Eberle, state legislator
- Charlie Furbush, baseball pitcher
- Jon Gillies, hockey goaltender
- John W. Gulick, U.S. Army major general
- Simon M. Hamlin, U.S. congressman
- Frederick Hinckley, land developer, mayor and state legislator
- Ed McAleney, football player
- Wes McCauley, hockey player and referee
- Standish Meacham, historian
- Terry Morrison, state legislator
- Judd Nelson, actor
- James C. Oliver, U.S. congressman
- Edward Reynolds, first Mayor of South Portland (1899–1900), state senator
- Bill Swift, baseball pitcher
