= Apoquindo Waterfall =

Coordinates: 33°26′29″S 70°27′37″W

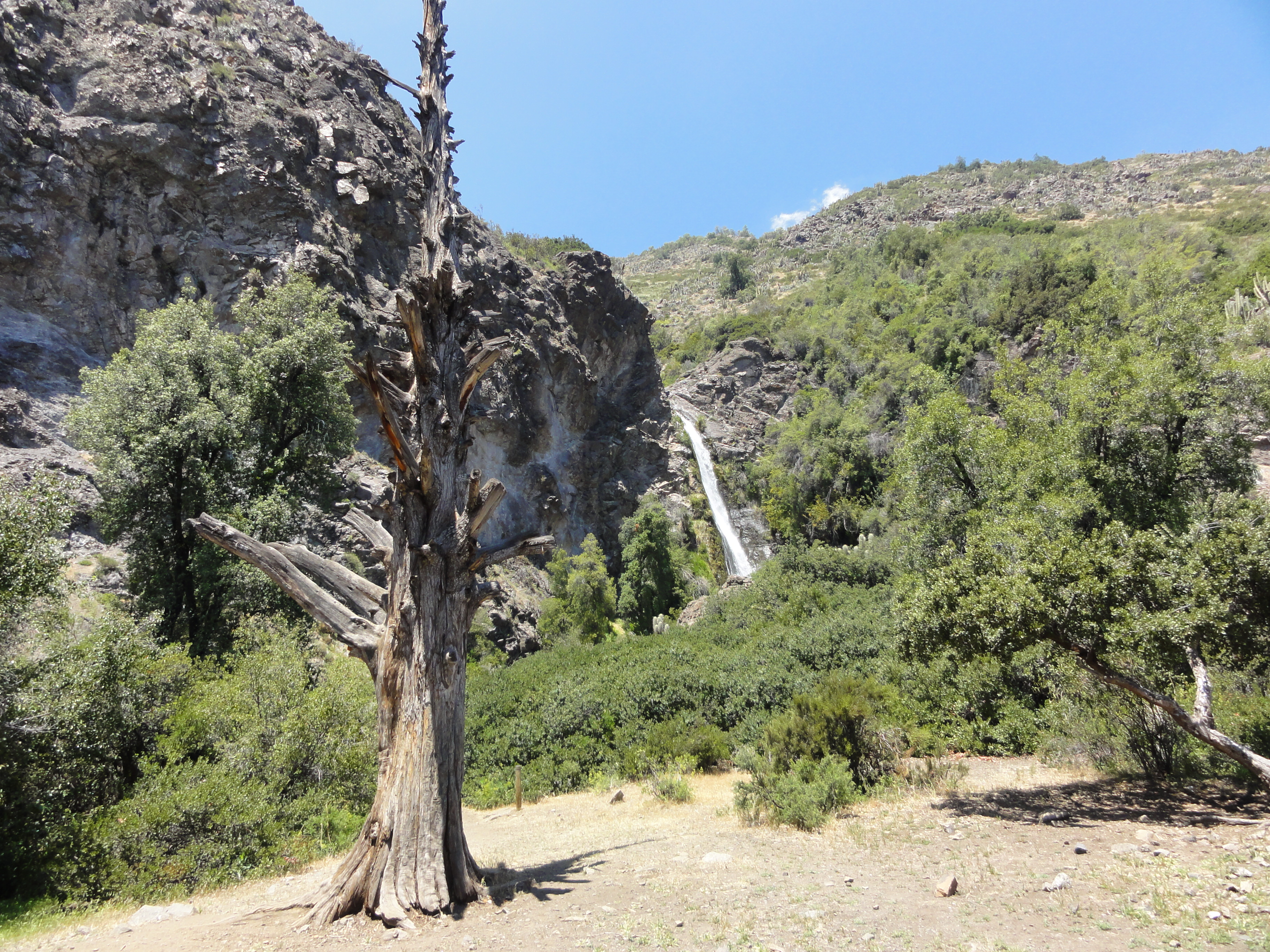
Apoquindo Waterfall

The Apoquindo Waterfall is a waterfall in Waters of Ramon Natural Park (Spanish: Parque Natural Aguas de Ramón) on the east side of Santiago, Chile, near Apoquindo. It is fed by melting snow from Cerro San Ramón and Cerro Provincia. The waterfall has a main drop of about 25 meters (82 ft).
