= Dihininet Demsew Jara =

Ethiopian long-distance runner

Dihininet Demsew Jara (born 15 September 1994) is an Ethiopian female long-distance runner who competes in road running events, including the marathon. She represented her country at the 2016 IAAF World Half Marathon Championships and shared in the team silver medal with Netsanet Gudeta and Genet Yalew after finishing eighth individually.

She made her debut in the marathon at the 2009 Košice Peace Marathon, where she finished fifth in a time of 2:48:03 hours. The following year she had top five finishes at the Nagpur and Rabat Half Marathons, achieving a best of 72:02 minutes. At the 2011 Xiamen Marathon she fell mid-race but, despite limping to the finish, set a personal best of 2:37:18 hours in eighth place. She ran two further marathons that season, placing third at the Omsk Marathon and Marrakesh Marathon.

Dihininet was highly active in the 2012 season. Highlights included a win at the Suresnes Foulees 10K in a personal best of 34:28 minutes and a top three finish at the Caen Marathon. She missed much of 2013, but returned in November with a 10K win in Marseille. She travelled to the United States in 2014 and had her first marathon wins at the Cowtown Marathon, The Woodlands Marathon and Vermont City Marathon, as well as a runner-up finish at the Cleveland Marathon (a place she repeated in 2015). A new 10K best of 33:28 came in a win in Abu Dhabi in 2015, then a new marathon best of 2:35:33 hours followed when she was fourth at the Changsha Marathon. Third place at the 2016 Ethiopian Half Marathon Championships brought her earned her an international debut at the IAAF World Half Marathon Championships. She spent 2017 in Canada and had half marathon wins at low level races in Edmonton, Quebec City and Montreal.

== International competitions ==
Year	Competition	Venue	Position	Event	Notes
2016	World Half Marathon Championships	Cardiff, United Kingdom	8th	Half marathon	1:10:13
2016	World Half Marathon Championships	Cardiff, United Kingdom	2nd	Team	3:26:29
