= Paycor Stadium =

Stadium in Cincinnati, Ohio

- "The Jungle"

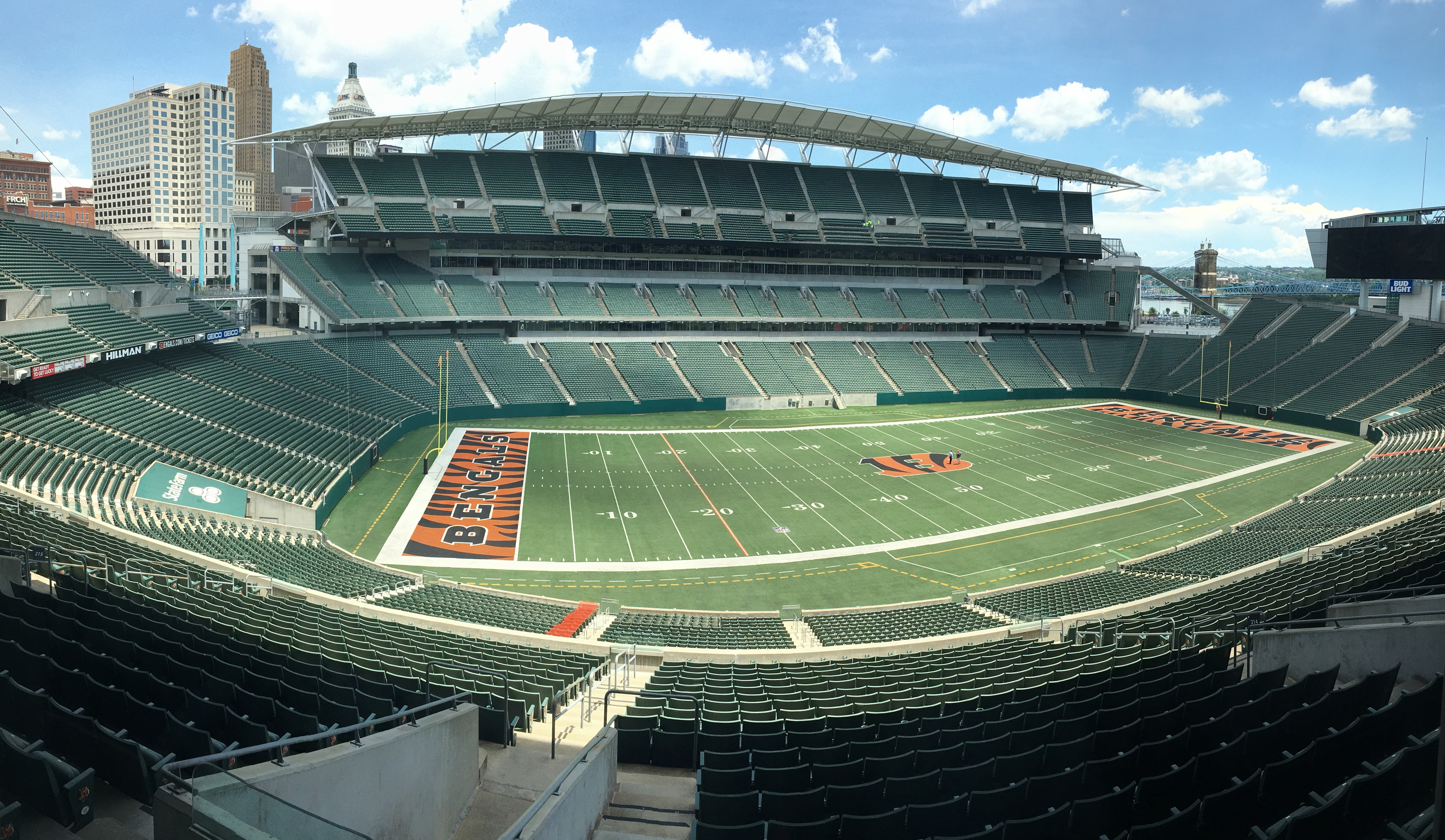
- The stadium in 2017

- Location in Ohio Location in the United States
- Former names: Paul Brown Stadium (2000–2021)
- Address: 1 Paycor Stadium; USA
- Location: Cincinnati, Ohio, U.S.
- Coordinates: 39.095°N 84.516°W
- Owner: Hamilton County
- Operator: Cincinnati Bengals
- Capacity: 65,515
- Executive suites: 114
- Surface: Kentucky Bluegrass (2000–2003); FieldTurf (2004–2011); Act Global synthetic turf (2012–2017); Shaw Sports Momentum Pro (2018–2023); FieldTurf CORE (2024-Present)
- Record attendance: 67,260 (Bengals vs. Dolphins, Thursday, September 29, 2022)
- Public transit: Connector at The Banks

Construction
- Groundbreaking: April 25, 1998
- Opened: August 19, 2000; 26 years ago
- Cost: $455 million ($851 million in 2025 dollars)
- Architects: NBBJ; Glaser Associates Inc. Moody Nolan; Stallworth Architecture Inc.
- Project manager: Getz Ventures
- Structural engineers: Ove Arup & Partners/Graham, Obermeyer
- Services engineer: Flack & Kurtz
- General contractor: TBMD Joint Venture (Turner/Barton Malow/D.A.G.)

Tenants
- Cincinnati Bengals (NFL) 2000–present Cincinnati Bearcats (NCAA) 2014

Paycor Stadium, previously known as Paul Brown Stadium, is an outdoor football stadium in Cincinnati, Ohio. It is the home venue of the Cincinnati Bengals of the National Football League (NFL) and opened on August 19, 2000.

Originally named after the Bengals' founder, Paul Brown, the stadium is currently sponsored by Paycor, is located on approximately 22 acres (8.9 ha) of land, and has a listed seating capacity of 65,515. The stadium is nicknamed "The Jungle"; the Guns N' Roses song "Welcome to the Jungle", is the team's unofficial anthem due in part to the nickname.

The construction of the stadium included $555 million of public funding, the largest public subsidy for an NFL stadium at the time. The Bengals had threatened to leave Cincinnati unless the city agreed to subsidize the stadium. In 2011, The Wall Street Journal described the stadium deal as "unusually lopsided in favor of the team and risky for taxpayers." Since then, additional costs have been imposed on taxpayers related to the stadium. By one estimate, taxpayers will have paid $1.1 billion by 2026, the year in which the 26-year deal expires.

== History ==
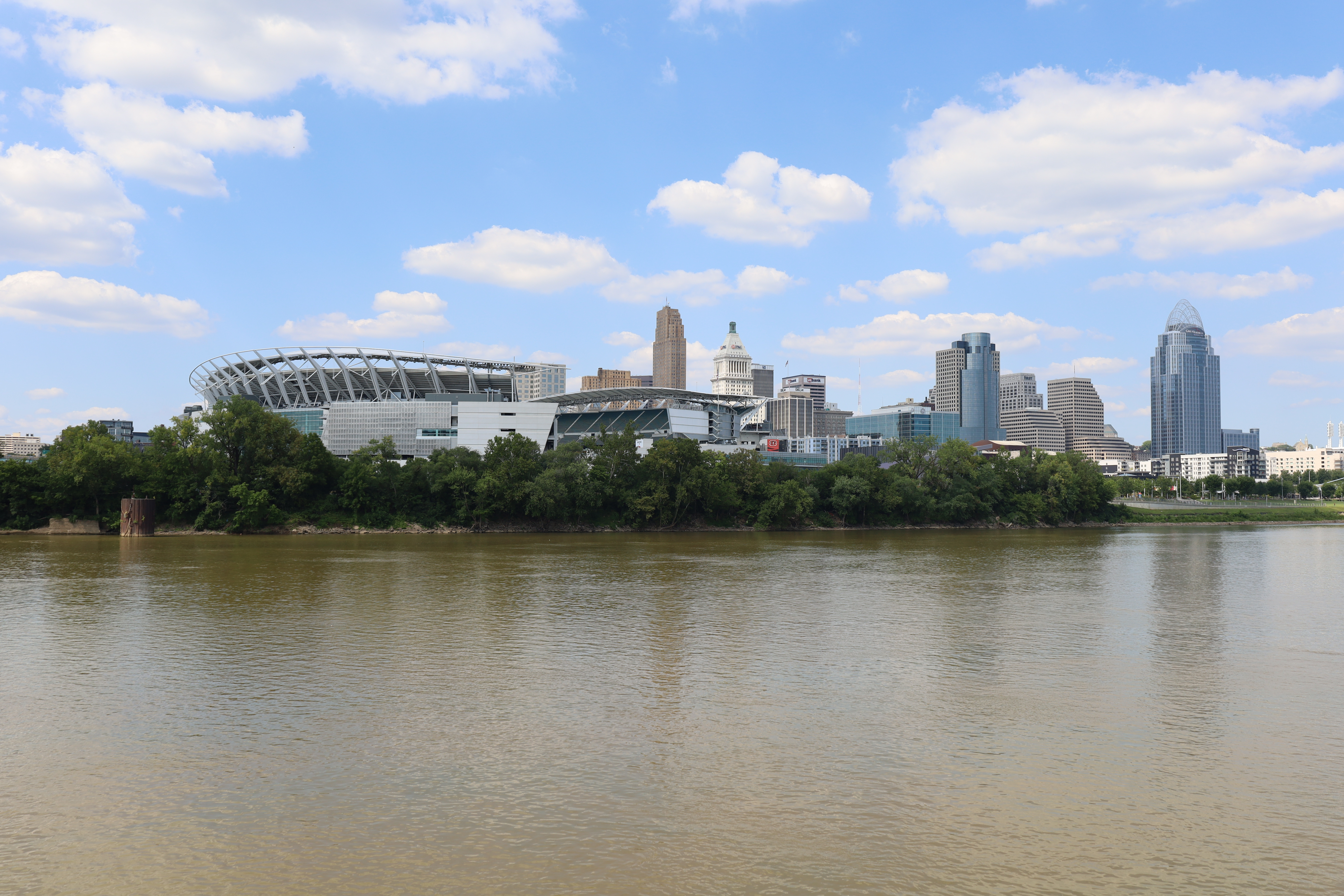
The stadium viewed from the river in 2022

In 1996, Hamilton County voters passed a one-half percent sales tax increase to fund the building of two new home venues for both the Bengals and MLB's Cincinnati Reds. The Bengals and the Reds previously shared tenancy of Riverfront Stadium, later known as Cinergy Field, but both teams complained that the aging multipurpose facility lacked modern amenities and other things necessary for small-market teams to thrive and survive. Construction of the replacements for Cinergy Field began with the groundbreaking for the then-Paul Brown Stadium in 1998; the stadium was completed in time for the 2000 NFL season and opened in August of that year. Cinergy Field would then spend two seasons as a partially-demolished, baseball-only facility (the construction of Great American Ball Park necessitating this) before what was left of it was imploded in December 2002.

For its first four years, the field was natural Kentucky Bluegrass, but maintenance problems arose, and at one point it was rated as the third worst field in the league. Hamilton County explored other options and chose the synthetic FieldTurf system. The infilled artificial turf looks and feels like real grass and, since the field markings are sewn into the fabric, repainting between games is unnecessary. The reduced maintenance saved the county approximately US$100,000 annually. Additionally, it opens Paycor Stadium to other uses without worry of damage to the turf. The FieldTurf was installed for the 2004 season. The field is one of only two stadiums in the NFL to have "five miles of piping" running under the field to keep the rubber inlays heated. In April 2012, the stadium chose to update the playing surface with an installation of Act Global synthetic turf. In 2018, the stadium was equipped with a new top-of-the-line synthetic turf system. Manufactured by Shaw Sports Turf, the product includes Strenexe XD slit-film fibers that are supported by synthetic turf backing, UltraLoc. In response to player safety concerns, the Cincinnati Bengals announced in February 2024 that the stadium would be returning to the FieldTurf system, but upgrading to the newer FieldTurf CORE version, becoming the 8th NFL franchise to do so.

Two LED video displays at either end zone, installed in 2000, provide a good view of the on-field action for every spectator. Over 200 feet (61 m) of ribbon display were installed along the fascia of the stadium. The scoreboards and ribbons were later upgraded after the 2014 off-season to larger HD models.

On August 9, 2022, the stadium entered a naming rights agreement with Paycor HCM Inc., a Cincinnati-based company founded by Robert J. Coughlin, expanding the company's sponsorship deal with the Bengals that saw the stadium renamed Paycor Stadium, with the company paying an undisclosed sum for 16 years of naming rights. This made Lambeau Field the only stadium named after a person in the league, and made it, along with Chicago's Soldier Field, the only two stadiums without a naming rights partner in the NFL.

In 2026, a series of upgrades in several phases were announced for the stadium as the lease was extended to 2036. First phase upgrades include renovated restrooms, upgraded concessions, transformed club lounges, reimagined suites, a redesigned Bengals Pro Shop, modernised scoreboard control room, improved wayfinding, and core infrastructure improvements. Further improvements set to begin in 2027 will include adding escalators, replacing stadium seats, and a new and larger videoboard featuring enhanced technology.

== Notable events ==
=== College football ===
The University of Cincinnati Bearcats and the Ohio State Buckeyes played the first college football game at the stadium on September 21, 2002, before a sold-out crowd of 66,319. On September 5, 2009, the Kentucky Wildcats and the Miami Redhawks played their opening games there. The University of Cincinnati also played Oklahoma in 2010 at the stadium. The Sooners won the game 31–29 with 58,253 fans in attendance. In 2011 the Bearcats played Big East Conference opponents Louisville Cardinals and West Virginia Mountaineers at the stadium. The Bearcats returned to the stadium for the 2014 football season due to renovations of Nippert Stadium, with the largest attendance being Miami (OH) at 41,926. The average attendance was 28,840 for the year. On September 8, 2018, Miami (OH) hosted the Bearcats at the stadium for their annual Victory Bell rivalry, which will also feature games at Paycor Stadium in 2022 and 2026.

List of college football games at the stadium
Date	Home team	Opponent	Score	Attendance
September 21, 2002	Cincinnati	Ohio State	19–23	66,319
September 5, 2009	Miami (OH)	Kentucky	0–42	41,037
September 25, 2010	Cincinnati	Oklahoma	29–31	58,253
October 15, 2011	Cincinnati	Louisville	25–16	40,971
November 12, 2011	Cincinnati	West Virginia	21–24	48,152
September 12, 2014	Cincinnati	Toledo	58–34	31,912
September 20, 2014	Cincinnati	Miami (OH)	31–24	41,926
October 4, 2014	Cincinnati	Memphis	14–41	25,456
October 24, 2014	Cincinnati	South Florida	34–17	30,024
November 13, 2014	Cincinnati	East Carolina	54–46	19,113
December 6, 2014	Cincinnati	Houston	38–31	24,606
September 8, 2018	Miami (OH)	Cincinnati	0–21	16,062
September 17, 2022	Miami (OH)	Cincinnati	17–38	30,109
September 19, 2026	Cincinnati	Miami (OH)		

=== Concerts ===
The Cincinnati Music Festival (formerly the Cincinnati Jazz Festival) is held there every year.

Date	Artist	Opening act(s)	Tour / Concert name	Attendance	Revenue	Notes
July 1, 2012	Kenny Chesney; Tim McGraw	Grace Potter and the Nocturnals; Jake Owen	Brothers of the Sun Tour	42,716 / 45,764	$3,495,146	The first major concert at the stadium.
July 27, 2013	Fantasia	–	Side Effects of You Tour	–	–	This concert was a part of the Macy's Music Festival.
July 25, 2014	Robin Thicke	–	Blurred Lines Tour	–	–	This concert was a part of the Macy's Music Festival.
July 11, 2015	Demi Lovato	Rixton	Demi World Tour	–	–	This concert was part of the MLB All-Star Game Concert.
July 18, 2015	Luke Bryan	Florida Georgia Line; Randy Houser; Thomas Rhett; Dustin Lynch; DJ Rock	Kick the Dust Up Tour	52,019 / 52,019	$3,103,468	
July 6, 2016	Guns N' Roses	Tyler Bryant & The Shakedown	Not in This Lifetime... Tour	32,516 / 33,845	$2,857,336	Former GNR drummer Steven Adler was the special guest.
May 13, 2022	Garth Brooks	Mitch Rossell	Stadium Tour	80,000 / 80,000	—	The concert on May 14, 2022, was originally scheduled to take place on September 18, 2021, but was postponed due to the COVID-19 pandemic.
May 14, 2022	Garth Brooks	Ghost Hounds	Stadium Tour	80,000 / 80,000	—	The concert on May 14, 2022, was originally scheduled to take place on September 18, 2021, but was postponed due to the COVID-19 pandemic.
June 30, 2023	Taylor Swift	Muna; Gracie Abrams	The Eras Tour	-	-	Swift's first Cincinnati show since 2010's Fearless Tour. First female act in stadium history to sell out a show and first female act in history to sell out two shows on a single tour.
July 1, 2023	Taylor Swift	Muna; Gracie Abrams	The Eras Tour	-	-	Swift's first Cincinnati show since 2010's Fearless Tour. First female act in stadium history to sell out a show and first female act in history to sell out two shows on a single tour.
August 2, 2024	Luke Combs		Growin’ Up And Gettin’ Old Tour			
August 3, 2024	Luke Combs		Growin’ Up And Gettin’ Old Tour			

=== Other events ===
Unusual for a venue of its size, Paycor Stadium hosts the annual Queen City Classic Chess Tournament in the spring.

== Features ==
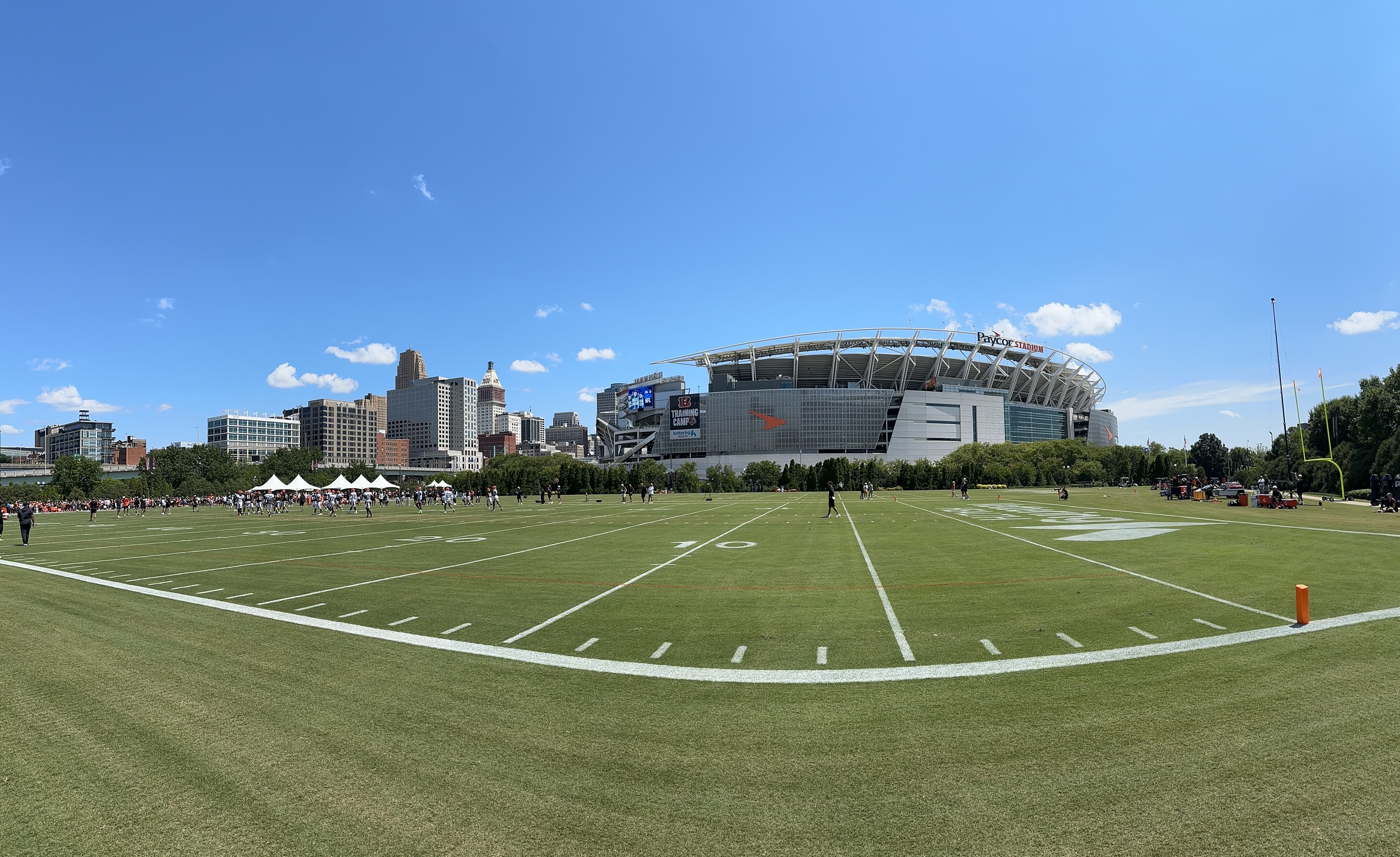
Kettering Health Bengals Practice Fields, where the Cincinnati Bengals practice, with Paycor Stadium in the background

Paycor Stadium also houses the Bengals' administrative offices and training and practice facilities. The game field at Paycor Stadium is Momentum Pro, manufactured by Show Sports Turf. There are three smaller practice fields nearby. Two are sodded with natural grass, while the third is equipped with AstroTurf.

Several local busing companies offer round trip transportation to Paycor Stadium from designated locations throughout the Cincinnati and Northern Kentucky area. One such example is the Cincinnati Metro's Jungle-to-Jungle Express, which originates at Jungle Jim's International Market in Fairfield, a suburb of Cincinnati.

Premium seating options are available in 114 private suites and 7,600 club seats. Amenities include in-seat food and beverage service and access to the club lounges for fine dining options.

On-site retail merchandise sales are available in the Bengals pro shop, located on the plaza level on the north end of the stadium. There are 56 concession stands and eight stores.

== Architecture ==
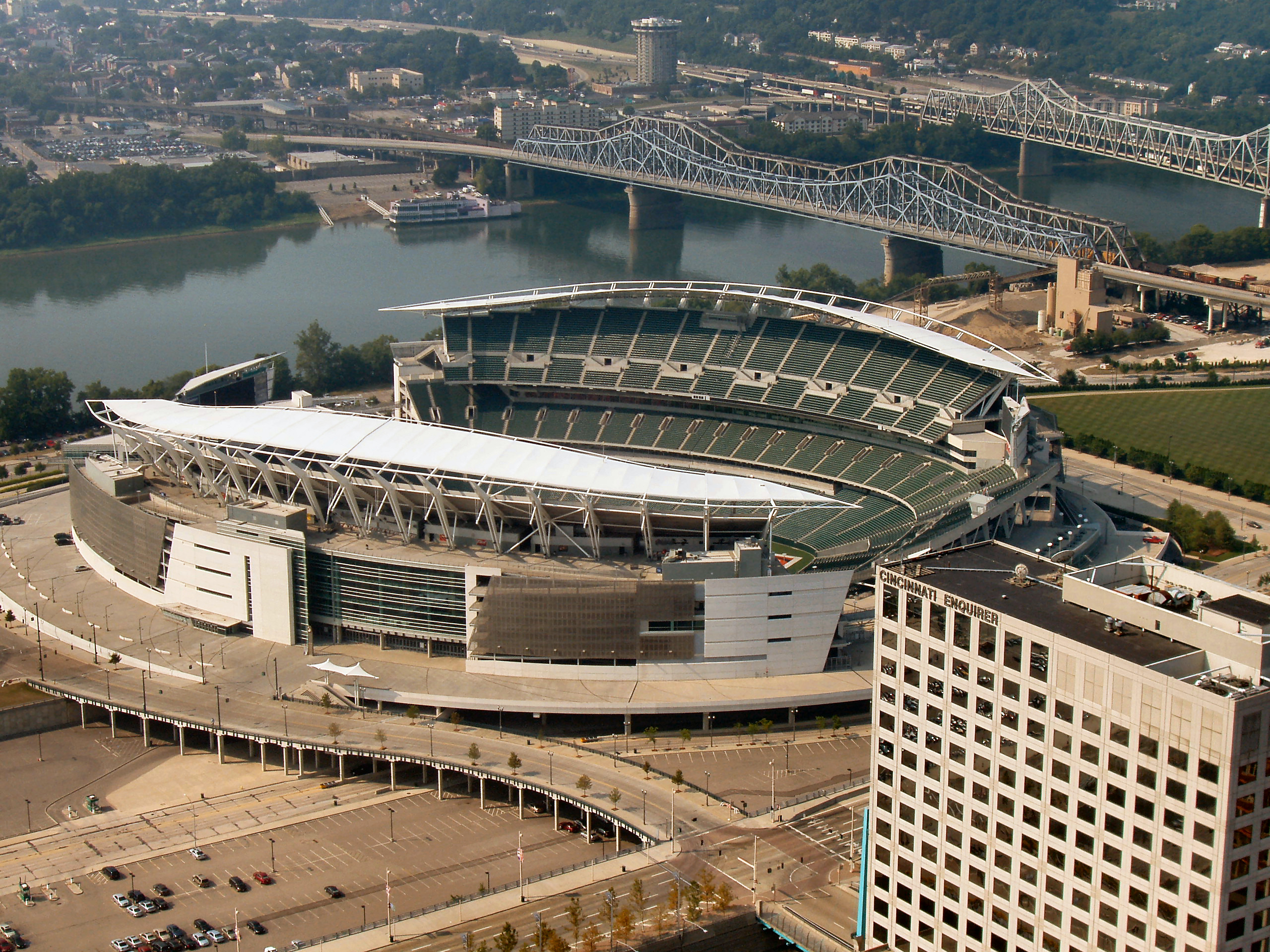
Paycor Stadium in 2005

The stadium was designed by architectural firm NBBJ, led by Dan Meis. It was the first NFL facility to win an AIA design award, and one of only two sports venues to be honored. The open corners allow for views into the stadium, while stadium fans can view the downtown skyline and bridges crossing the Ohio River.

Paycor Stadium is the only football stadium to make a list of "America's favorite 150 buildings and structures", according to a Harris Interactive survey. It ranked 101st on the list, whose range included all manner of major structures — skyscrapers, museums, churches, hotels, bridges, national memorials and more. No other football stadium was voted among the top 150, and among all sports venues, only Wrigley Field (31) and Yankee Stadium (84) ranked higher.

Preceded by Riverfront Stadium	Home of the Cincinnati Bengals; 2000–present	Succeeded by None
