= Vermont City Marathon =

American annual athletics race

- Date: Sunday before Memorial Day
- Location: Burlington, Vermont, U.S.
- Event type: Road
- Distance: Marathon and Marathon Relay
- Primary sponsor: M&T Bank
- Established: 1989 (37 years ago)
- Course records: Men: 2:15:52 (2026) (United States) Ryan Smith; Women: 2:33:40 (2023) (United States) Maegan Krifchin
- Website: https://www.runvermont.org
- Participants: 1473 finishers (2026)

The M&T Bank Vermont City Marathon (VCM) is an annual marathon in the city of Burlington, Vermont, in the United States, first held on May 28, 1989. The race is held on the Sunday of Memorial Day weekend. It is produced by RunVermont, a not-for-profit organization, and sponsored by M&T Bank.

== History ==
The race was first held in 1989.

The race record for men, set by Ryan Smith in 2026, is 2:15:52. The women's record is held by 2023 champion Maegan Krifchin, who ran 2:33:40.

The VCM was the first marathon to incorporate relay race teams consisting of between 2 and 5 members.

The 2020 race was cancelled due to the COVID-19 pandemic, with registrants given the option of running the race virtually or transferring their entry to 2021 or 2022. (Note: It had initially been postponed to October 25 before being cancelled.)

In 2024, a new prize pool was introduced for the nonbinary division.

=== Hall of Fame ===
In 2008 the race's Hall of Fame was renamed the RunVermont Hall of Fame and membership was expanded to include individuals who have been instrumental in the success of the race over the years such as the original Race Director, Gordon MacFarland, long-standing volunteers such as Don and Betty Lacharite, and runners of distinction throughout Vermont's athletics history. The RunVermont Hall of Fame also includes the 13 runners who completed the full 42.195 kilometres (26.219 mi) for the first 19 editions of the Vermont City Marathon.

== Other races ==
Runners in the M&T Bank Vermont City Marathon can compete in the full marathon, on a two-person relay team running half marathons, or on a three-to-five person relay team running legs ranging from 3.1 to 6.8 miles. The Vermont City Marathon was the first marathon in the USA to have a relay in conjunction with a full marathon as a regular part of the event.

== Community impact ==
The race is produced by RunVermont, a not-for-profit organization committed to promoting running in Vermont. RunVermont also organizes several other races including the Half Marathon Unplugged and Island Vines 10k/5k, as well as adult training programs, and also offers youth running and health education programs including Mini Milers, Mini Marathon, and Junior Milers.

== Winners ==
=== Men's ===
Year	Winner	Country	Time	Notes
1989	Joe Kreutz	United States	2:29:11	Course record
1990	Felix Pinto	Colombia	2:27:09	Course record
1992	Bob Hodge	United States	2:22:11	Course record
1993	Brad Hawthorne	United States	2:18:04	Course record
1994	Ángel Moreno	Mexico	2:21:34	
1995	Michael Slinskey	United States	2:21:40	
1996	Dan Verrington	United States	2:21:10	
1997	Tim Schuler	United States	2:18:58	
1998	Jerod Neas	United States	2:21:22	
1999	Weldon Johnson	United States	2:24:45	
2000	Greg Hill	United States	2:22:56	
2001	Michael Khobotov	United States	2:17:03	Course record
2002	Chad Newton	United States	2:26:27	
2003	Greg Wenneborg	United States	2:24:02	
2004	Peter Fleming	United States	2:24:02	
2005	Chris Juarez	United States	2:25:27	
2006	Matt Pelletier	United States	2:24:27	
2007	Matt Pelletier	United States	2:19:00	Second victory
2008	Matt Pelletier	United States	2:20:44	Third victory
2009	John Crews	United States	2:19:31	
2010	John Crews	United States	2:17:51	Second victory
2011	Dan Vassallo	United States	2:24:09	
2012	Matt Pelletier	United States	2:21:30	Fourth victory
2013	Christopher Zablocki	United States	2:18:24	
2014	Tyler C. Andrews	United States	2:20:27	
2015	Matt Pelletier	United States	2:19:12	Fifth victory
2016	Matt Pelletier	United States	2:23:02	Sixth victory
2017	Tyler C. Andrews	United States	2:19:41	Second victory
2018	Tyler C. Andrews	United States	2:17:44	Third victory
2019	Sergio Reyes	United States	2:17:40	
2020	Cancelled due to COVID-19 pandemic			
2021	Virtual due to COVID-19 pandemic			
2022	Sergio Reyes	United States	2:19:50	Second victory
2023	Louis Serafini	United States	2:17:55	
2024	Kiplangat Terer	United States	2:23:13	
2025	Ryan Eiler	United States	2:17:04	
2026	Ryan Smith	United States	2:15:52	Course record

=== Women's ===
Year	Winner	Country	Time	Notes
1989	Lea Sikora	United States	2:48:22	Course record
1990	Shirley Silsby	United States	2:51:24	
1992	Carol Virga	United States	2:47:28	Course record
1993	Laura Konantz	Canada	2:49:28	
1994	Cindy New	Canada	2:43:52	Course record
1995	Gordon Bakoulis	United States	2:38:32	Course record
1996	Cindy New	Canada	2:48:16	Second victory
1997	Mary Lynn Carter	United States	2:42:20	
1998	Gordon Bakoulis	United States	2:42:51	Second victory
1999	Regina Ronan	United States	2:49:14	
2000	Charlene Lyford	United States	2:46:10	
2001	Charlene Lyford	United States	2:54:33	Second victory
2002	Véronique Vandersmissen	Canada	2:41:20	
2003	Heather Gardiner	United States	2:45:31	
2004	Caryn Heffernan	United States	2:46:52	
2005	Susan Loken	United States	2:51:09	
2006	Heidi Westerling	United States	2:44:02	
2007	Heidi Westerling	United States	2:48:56	Second victory
2008	Caroine Chemwolo	United States	2:47:38	
2009	Heidi Westerling	United States	2:35:02	Course record; third victory
2010	Heidi Westover	United States	2:40:04	Fourth victory
2011	Heidi Westover	United States	2:46:49	Fifth victory
2012	Kasie Enman	United States	2:43:13	Highest-finishing Vermonter
2013	Heidi Westover	United States	2:42:02	Sixth victory
2014	Dihininet Demsew Jara	Ethiopia	2:43:14	
2015	Kasie Enman	United States	2:49:03	Highest-finishing Vermonter; second victory
2016	Madeline Duhon	United States	2:50:07	
2017	Kasie Enman	United States	2:50:26	Highest-finishing Vermonter; third victory
2018	Bizuwork Kasaye	Ethiopia	2:42:24	
2019	Rachel Schilkowsky	United States	2:45:59	
2020	Cancelled due to COVID-19			
2021	Virtual due to COVID-19			
2022	Annmarie Tuxbury	United States	2:39:18	
2023	Maegan Krifchin	United States	2:33:40	Course record
2024	Hannah Rowe	United States	2:46:56	
2025	Margaret Vido	United States	2:41:12	
2026	Kellyn Taylor	United States	2:35:19	

=== By nationality ===
Country	Men's Open	Women's Open	Total
United States	29	25	52
Colombia	1	0	1
Mexico	1	0	1
Canada	0	4	4
Ethiopia	0	2	2
Kenya	1	0	1

=== Repeat Marathon Winners ===
Repeat Champions	No. of Wins	Years of the Wins
Heidi Westover (nee Westerling)	6	2006, 2007, 2009, 2010, 2011, 2013
Matt Pelletier	6	2006, 2007, 2008, 2012, 2015, 2016
Kasie Enman	3	2012, 2015, 2017
Tyler Andrews	3	2014, 2017, 2018
Sergio Reyes	2	2019, 2022
John Crews	2	2009, 2010
Cindy New	2	1994, 1996
Gordon Bakoulis	2	1995, 1998
Charlene Lyford	2	2000, 2001

Sources:
- "Archive of Results (1989+)". Vermont City Marathon.
- "Top Ten Results". 27th Peoples United Bank Vermont City Marathon & Marathon Relay Race Results. Cool Running. 25 May 2015.
