= Maegan =

Maegan is a female given name. Notable people with the name include:

- Maegan Chant (born 1997), Canadian artistic gymnast
- Maegan Cottone (born 1981), British-American songwriter
- Maegan Houang, Vietnamese-American writer and director
- Maegan Krifchin (born 1988), American long-distance runner
- Maegan Manasse (born 1995), American tennis player
- Maegan Rosa (born 1992), American-Canadian soccer player
