= Tyler C. Andrews =

American endurance athlete (born 1990)

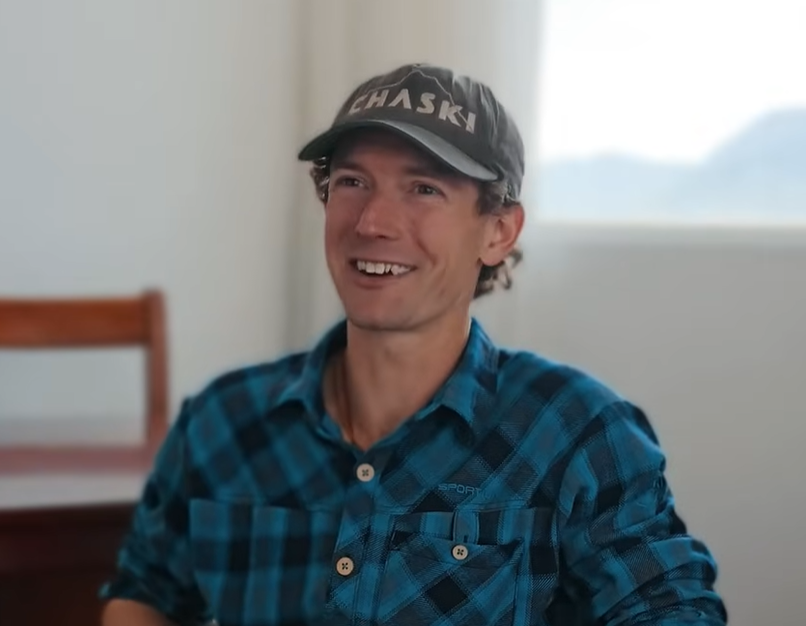

Personal information
- Born: 4 May 1990 (age 36) Concord, Massachusetts, United States
- Height: 1.73 m (5 ft 8 in)
- Weight: 55 kg (121 lb)
- Website: https://www.tylercandrews.com

Sport
- Country: United States
- Events: Marathon, ultramarathon, trail running, mountaineering
- College team: Tufts University
- Team: La Sportiva

Achievements and titles
- Personal bests: 5000m: 14:22.93; 10,000m: 29:06 ½-marathon: 1:03:38; Marathon: 2:15:52; 50km: 2:42:56; 50 miles: 5:43:26

Tyler C. Andrews (born May 4, 1990) is an American long-distance runner. A trail running, ultra-marathon, and mountaineering specialist, he owns multiple world records on big mountains including Everest, Manaslu, Kilimanjaro, and Aconcagua; he also earned a silver medal at the 2016 IAU 50 km World Championships and, in 2019, he won the USA Track and Field 50 Mile National Championship by winning Tussey Mountainback 50 Miler. As of 2025, Andrews competes for La Sportiva's professional team.

Andrews has set more than 100 Fastest known time running records, including the speed records for ascent and descent of Manaslu and Ama Dablam in 2024, Kilimanjaro and Aconcagua in 2023, the Mt. Everest Base Camp Trail in 2024, and Ojos del Salado in 2021.

In addition, Andrews qualified for and ran in the 2016 and 2020 United States Olympic Trials Marathon, qualifying with a 10th place, 2-hour, 16-minute, 59-second finish at the 2014 California International Marathon and a 2-hour, 17-minute, 44-second finish to win the 2018 Vermont City Marathon.

Andrews is also a survivor of Aplastic Anemia and an advocate for research and support via the Aplastic Anemia and MDS International Foundation.

== Career ==
=== Youth and Aplastic Anemia Treatment ===
Andrews grew up in Concord, Massachusetts and was diagnosed with Aplastic anemia, a rare and often fatal blood disease, at age 6 in January, 1997. He was treated successfully throughout 1997 at Massachusetts General Hospital in Boston, Massachusetts and has been in remission ever since.

=== High school ===
Andrews attended Concord Academy in Concord, Massachusetts. He ran cross country, but showed little promise as a national caliber runner, with a personal best of only 18:30 for 5 km.

=== College ===
Andrews attended Skidmore College for one year before transferring to Tufts University where he ran NCAA Division III Cross Country and Track and field and studied mechanical engineering. He qualified for the 10,000m race at the 2012 NCAA Division 3 Track & Field National Championship, where he placed 11th and the 2012 NCAA Division 3 Cross Country Championship, where he placed 104th. He graduated in 2013 with personal best times of 14:45.89 for 5,000m and 30:22.82 for 10,000m. While attending Tufts, Andrews was teammates and roommates with distance runner Matt Rand, with whom Andrews competed at the 2020 United States Olympic Trials (marathon).

=== Professional career ===
==== Road Running (2013-2018) ====
Following his collegiate career, Andrews began competing as a professional runner, beginning with his first marathon victory at the Vermont City Marathon, which he would go on to win three times (2014, 2017, 2018).

Andrews' road racing peaked in 2016 when he won the Mohawk Hudson River Marathon in a personal best time of 2:15:52, setting a course record. His record was broken by Joe Whelan in 2022. Andrews represented the United States at the 2016 IAU 50 km World Championships in Doha, Qatar, where he earned a silver medal with a time of 2:56:04.

==== Transition to Mountain and Trail Running (2019-2021) ====
In 2019, Andrews began shifting his focus toward trail and mountain running, setting his first world record on Peru's Salkantay Inca Trail, completing the 60 km route in 6:13:02. Later that year, he won the USATF 50 Mile National Championship at the Tussey Mountainback in Pennsylvania, setting a course record of 5:43:26.

During the COVID-19 pandemic of 2020, Andrews demonstrated his versatility by setting the world record for the 50 km on a treadmill (2:42:56) during the virtual Chaski Challenge. In the same year, he established his first Himalayan record by completing the Everest Base Camp Trail round trip in 23:42:13.

==== High-Altitude Mountaineering Records (2021-Present) ====
Andrews has pioneered a unique niche in the mountaineering world, focusing on speed ascents and descents of some of the world's most iconic peaks. In 2021, he set world records on Ojos del Salado, the highest volcano in the world (9:29:46), and Ecuador's Cotopaxi (1:36:35).

His mountaineering accomplishments expanded significantly in 2022-2024, with world records on Mount Fuji (sea to summit to sea in 9:50:38), Aconcagua (11:24:46), Kilimanjaro (6:37:57), and several technical Himalayan peaks including Manaslu (9:52:00), Mera Peak (15:52:00), and Ama Dablam (6:20:30).

By 2024, Andrews had established himself as one of the world’s premier mountain athletes, with over 100 world records on mountains and trails across five continents.

In March 2025, Andrews announced that he would be attempting the fastest ascent of Mount Everest without using supplemental oxygen. Andrews made three unsuccessful record attempts in May, before returning in late September for two more tries. He progressed as high as 26,400 feet, but turned around due to deep snow pack and an elevated risk for avalanches. On May 28, 2026 Andrews summited Mount Everest using supplemental oxygen in a new world record of 9:55:43, improving the previous record of 10:56:46, set by Lhakpa Gelu Sherpa in 2003, by over an hour.

== Achievements and records ==
| Year | Competition | Venue | Position | Event | Notes |
|---|---|---|---|---|---|
| 2013 | Boston's Run to Remember Half Marathon | Boston, Massachusetts, United States | 1st (Course Record) | Half-marathon | 1 h 7 min 3 s |
| 2014 | Vermont City Marathon | Burlington, Vermont, United States | 1st | Marathon | 2 h 20 min 26 s |
| 2015 | USA Track & Field 50 km Road Championships | Islip, New York, United States | 2nd | 50 km | 3 h 5 min 33 s |
| 2015 | STRIVE Treadmill 10K | Arlington, Virginia, United States | 1st | 10 km | 29 min 6 s |
| 2015 | Boston Marathon Expo Treadmill Half Marathon | Boston, Massachusetts, United States | 1st | Half-marathon | 1 h 3 min 38 |
| 2016 | US Olympic Team Trials Marathon | Los Angeles, California, United States | 83rd | Marathon | 2 h 33 min 30 s |
| 2016 | Mad City 50K | Madison, Wisconsin, United States | 1st (Course Record) | 50 km | 2 h 56 min 1 s |
| 2016 | Hudson Mohawk River Marathon | Albany, New York, United States | 1st (Course Record) | Marathon | 2 h 15 min 52 s |
| 2016 | IAU 50km World Championships | Doha, Qatar | 2nd | 50 km | 2 h 56 min 4 s |
| 2017 | Mainichi Biwako Marathon | Otsu, Japan | 22nd | Marathon | 2 h 16 min 7 s |
| 2017 | Vermont City Marathon | Burlington, Vermont, United States | 1st | Marathon | 2 h 19 min 41 s |
| 2018 | Vermont City Marathon | Burlington, Vermont, United States | 1st | Marathon | 2 h 17 min 44 s |
| 2019 | Valentine Invitational 5,000m | Boston, Massachusetts, United States | 12th | 5,000m | 14 min 22.93 s |
| 2019 | Salkantay Inca Trail | Soraypampa, Cusco, Peru | World Record | 60 km | 6 h 13 min 02 s |
| 2019 | Tussey Mountainback 50 Mile (USATF 50 Mile National Championship) | Boalsburg, Pennsylvania, United States | 1st (Course Record) | 50-mile | 5 h 43 min 26 s |
| 2020 | US Olympic Team Trials Marathon | Atlanta, Georgia, United States | 82nd | Marathon | 2 h 22 min 51 s |
| 2020 | Chaski Challenge Treadmill 50K | Concord, Massachusetts, United States | 1st | 50 km | 2 h 42 min 56 s |
| 2020 | Everest Base Camp Trail (Round Trip) | Lukla, Nepal | World Record | 110 km | 23 h 42 min 13 s |
| 2021 | Ojos del Salado (Ascent and Descent) | Copiapo, Chile | World Record | 54 km | 9 h 29 min 46 s |
| 2021 | Cotopaxi (Ascent and Descent) | Cotopaxi, Ecuador | World Record | 5 km | 1 h 36 min 35 s |
| 2021 | Javelina Jundred 100K | McDowell, Arizona, United States | 1st | 100 km | 8 h 49 min 9 s |
| 2022 | Leadville Trail Marathon | Leadville, Colorado, United States | 1st (Course Record) | Marathon | 3 h 22 min 24 s |
| 2022 | Mt Fuji (Sea to Summit to Sea) | Fuji, Shizuoka, Japan | World Record | 75 km | 9 h 50 min 38 s |
| 2023 | Aconcagua (Ascent and Descent) | Aconcagua, Mendoza Province, Argentina | World Record | 65 km | 11 h 24 min 46 s |
| 2023 | Kilimanjaro (Ascent and Descent) | Mweka, Moshi District, Tanzania | World Record | 43 km | 6 h 37 min 57 s |
| 2023 | Mount Washington Road Race | Gorham, New Hampshire, United States | 3rd | 12 km | 1 h 02 min 6 s |
| 2023 | Three Passes Loop | Namche, Khumbu, Nepal | World Record | 85 km | 19 h 50 min 55 s |
| 2024 | Cerro Provincia (Ascent and Descent) | Las Condes, Santiago, Chile | World Record | 24 km | 3 h 09 min 06 s |
| 2024 | Ojos del Salado (Ascent) | Copiapo, Chile | World Record | 7 km | 2 h 22 min 52 s |
| 2024 | Rucu Pichincha (Ascent) | Quito, Pichincha, Ecuador | World Record | 9 km | 1 h 42 min 45 s |
| 2024 | Polichaski Vertical Kilometer (Ascent) | Quito, Pichincha, Ecuador | World Record | 5 km | 49 min 41 sec |
| 2024 | Quito Trail Ecuador by UTMB, Oso 82K | Quito, Pichincha, Ecuador | 1st, Course Record | 82 km | 8 h 32 min 45 s |
| 2024 | Manaslu (Ascent) | Mansiri Himal, Nepal | World Record | 14 km | 9 h 52 min 0 s |
| 2024 | Mera Peak (Ascent) | Hinku Valley, Nepal | World Record | 82 km | 15 h 52 min 0 s |
| 2025 | Cotopaxi (Ascent and Descent from North Park Entrance) | Cotopaxi, Ecuador | World Record | 32 km | 4 h 30 min 4 s |
| 2026 | Mount Everest (Ascent) | Solokhumbu District, Nepal | World Record | 30 km | 9 h 55 min 43 s |
