= Flying Pig Marathon =

Marathon in Cincinnati, Ohio

- Date: Generally the first Sunday in May
- Location: Cincinnati, Ohio and Northern Kentucky
- Event type: Road
- Distance: Marathon - 26.2 mi
- Course records: 2:17:41 - Zach Kreft - 2026; 2:34:35 - Tatyana Pozdnyakova - 2002
- Website: flyingpigmarathon.com
- Participants: 36,000+

The Cincinnati Flying Pig Marathon is an annual 26.2 mi (42.2 km) race run the first Sunday of May in Cincinnati, Ohio. Founded by Robert J. Coughlin, it was first held in 1999, it is the 3rd-largest first-time marathon in the United States. The marathon had nearly 5000 finishers in 2008, and total participation for all weekend events exceeded 30,408 in 2011. The race starts and finishes downtown and also crosses into Northern Kentucky. It is a qualifying race for the Boston Marathon.

== History ==
=== Naming ===
For many years, Cincinnati was known as "Porkopolis"; this nickname came from the city's large pork interests. In 1988, the city built a park, Bicentennial Commons, to celebrate the 200th anniversary of the city's founding and commissioned British artist Andrew Leicester to create a sculpture for the entrance. Leicester came up with four steampipes, a nod to the city's riverboat history, each topped with a winged pig; the wings are a nod to General Electric Aviation, a major presence in the city. Initial reaction was derision, but the city soon embraced the "Flying Pigs", using it as a symbol and a brand. The marathon was named after them.

=== Running ===
The marathon was first held in 1999 when Elly Rono of Kenya and the University of Southern Indiana (and a future 2:10 marathoner), won in the men's division.

In 2002, overall female winner Tatyana Pozdnyakova of Ukraine set the course record with a finishing time of 2:34:35 (achieved at the age of 47).

In 2006, overall male winner Cecil Franke held the course record for twenty years with a finishing time of 2:20:25 until Notre Dame alum Zach Kreft cut the time down by almost three minutes in 2026.

In 2011, legally blind runner Amy McDonaugh won the race in the women's division without a guide and with a time of 2:58:14. (Note: McDonaugh was "completely blind in her right eye and her vision [was] 23/100 in her left eye with no peripheral sight".)

In 2020, the race was cancelled due to the coronavirus pandemic, with all registrants given the option of either running the race virtually or transferring their entry to a later year. The race was postponed and offered virtually in 2021 as well.

== Course ==
The race course starts in downtown Cincinnati and crosses the Taylor-Southgate Bridge over the Ohio River into Northern Kentucky, where it travels through Newport and crosses westward over the Licking River via the Fourth Street Bridge into Covington. From Covington, the route takes the Clay Wade Bailey Bridge back over the Ohio River into Cincinnati. After looping westward the first leg ends east of downtown in Eden Park, a distance of 6.84 miles (11.01 km). The race course then makes its way east through East Walnut Hills, O'Bryonville, and Hyde Park and ends after 5.16 miles (8.30 km) at Richards Industries on Wasson Road. The third leg goes east to the village of Mariemont before looping back to head towards the river; it ends in Linwood, having traversed 7.67 miles (12.34 km). The final leg is 6.55 miles (10.54 km) to the finish line downtown. The last 7 km (4.3 mi) of the fourth leg follow the Ohio River Scenic Byway (US 52) along the Ohio River, heading downtown toward the finish line.

== Other races ==
In recent years, the Flying Pig has included a 5K race, a 10K race, and a half marathon and a 2-mile "Flying Fur" event for dogs and humans. The 5K and 10K are held on the day before the marathon. The half marathon starts and finishes at the same locations as the full marathon, and is held on the same day as the full marathon.

== Recognition ==
In 2024 USA Today named the marathon the best in the US; the newspaper called out the scenic course and the race organizers' sense of fun with the pig theme as being attractive to runners.

== Winners ==
Key: Course record (in bold)

Winners by year
Year	Men's winner	Time	Women's winner	Time
1999	Elly Rono (KEN)	2:21:15	Sommer Settell (USA)	2:58:10
2000	Rudolf Jun (CZE)	2:23:02	Rebecca Gallaher (USA)	2:49:30
2001	Rudolf Jun (CZE)	2:27:59	Rebecca Gallaher (USA)	2:50:41
2002	Cornelio Velasco (MEX)	2:31:10	**Tatyana Pozdnyakova** (UKR)	**2:34:33**
2003	John Aerni (USA)	2:27:42	Lisa Veneziano (USA)	2:57:52
2004	Thomas Lentz (USA)	2:38:07	Pamilla "P.J." Ball (USA)	3:05:52
2005	Tim Rieger II (USA)	2:30:24	Alison Bedingfield (USA)	3:03:40
2006	Cecil Franke (USA)	2:20:26	Norah Shire (USA)	2:56:19
2007	Isaac Barnes (USA)	2:33:36	Leah Peelman (USA)	2:55:56
2008	Andy Martin (USA)	2:30:40	Michelle Didion (USA)	3:05:18
2009	Sergio Reyes (USA)	2:20:37	Autumn Ray (USA)	2:52:23
2010	Brian List (USA)	2:31:55	Cynthia Arnold (USA)	2:55:00
2011	Kieran O'Connor (USA)	2:28:02	Amy McDonaugh (USA)	2:58:10
2012	Sergio Reyes (USA)	2:22:04	Rachel Bea (USA)	2:54:38
2013	Sergio Reyes (USA)	2:21:49	Rebecca Walter (USA)	2:53:56
2014	Sergio Reyes (USA)	2:27:19	Amy Robillard (USA)	2:55:50
2015	Adam Goloyeske (USA)	2:32:53	Amy Robillard (USA)	2:53:07
2016	Sergio Reyes (USA)	2:26:03	Anne Flower (USA)	2:55:46
2017	Jack Randall (USA)	2:33:43	Kerry Lee (USA)	2:53:47
2018	Aaron Viets (USA)	2:29:36	Caitlin Keen (USA)	2:46:39
2019	Jack Randall (USA)	2:28:58	Anne Flower (USA)	2:49:17
2020	Race **canceled** due to the COVID-19 pandemic.			
2021	Alex Gold (USA)	2:26:28	Caitlin Keen (USA)	2:43:44
2022	Zac Holtkamp (USA)	2:27:18	Grace McCarron (USA)	2:50:00
2023	Jason Salyer (USA)	2:27:10	Caitlin Keen (USA)	2:45:34
2024	Jason Salyer (USA)	2:26:01	Olivia Anger (USA)	2:43:23
2025	Sean Ryan (USA)	2:22:41	Tori Parkinson (USA)	2:40:06
2026	**Zach Kreft** (USA)	**2:17:40**	Katherine Hallahan (USA)	2:48:43

== Repeat champions ==
Repeat winners	No. of wins	Years of the wins
Sergio Reyes	5	2009, 2012, 2013, 2014, 2016
Caitlin Keen	3	2018, 2021, 2023
Rudolf Jun	2	2000, 2001
Rebecca Gallaher	2	2000, 2001
Amy Robillard	2	2014, 2015
Anne Flower	2	2016, 2019
Jack Randall	2	2017, 2019
Jason Salyer	2	2023, 2024

== See also ==
- Big Pig Gig
- When pigs fly
