= Robert J. Coughlin =

Former CEO of Paycor

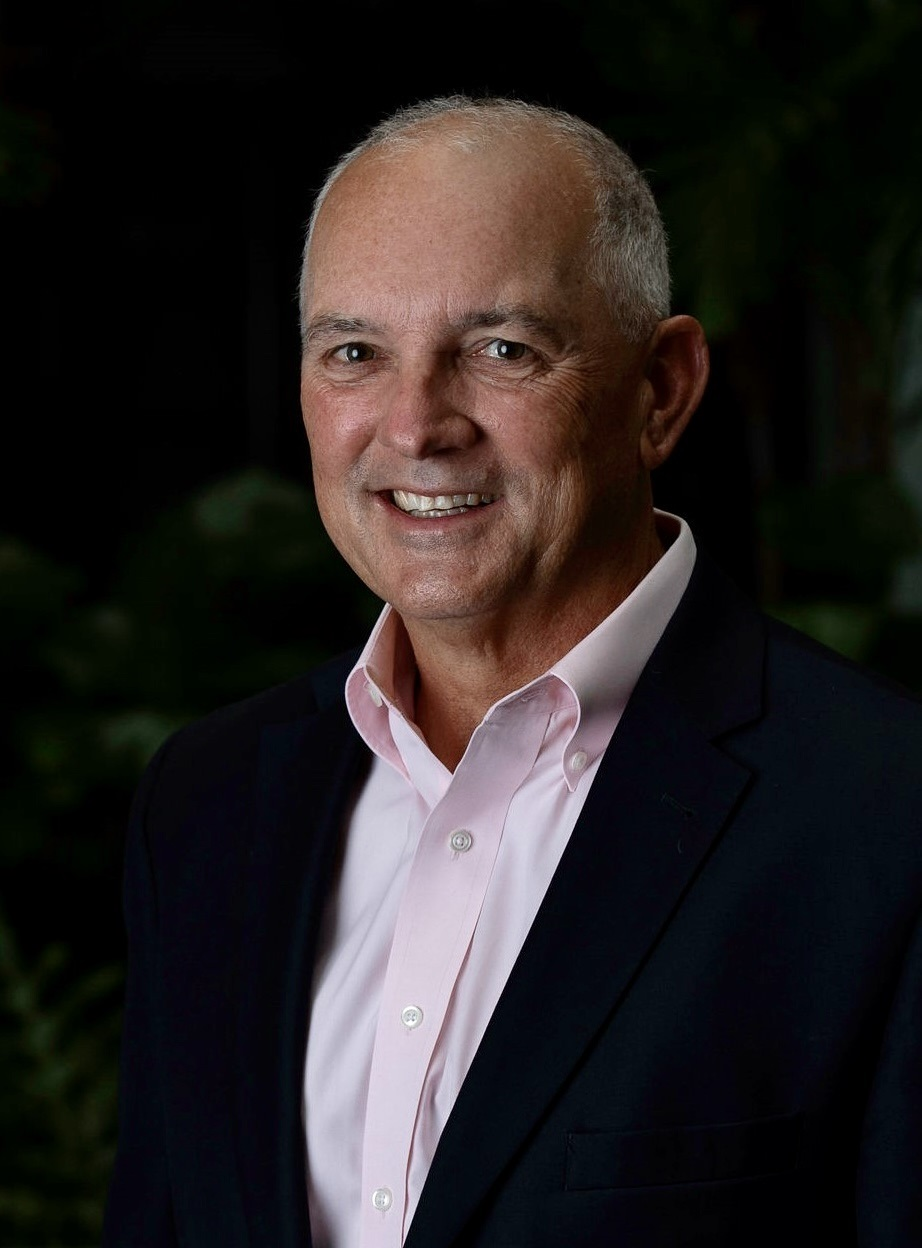
- Born: December 20, 1961 (age 64); Worcester, Massachusetts
- Education: Miami University
- Occupation: Entrepreneur
- Known for: Founder of Paycor
- Spouse: Jeanne

Robert "Bob" Coughlin (born December 20, 1961) is an American entrepreneur, best known for being the founder and prior Chairman/CEO of Paycor, a Human Capital Management (HCM) software and services company.

== Early life ==
Coughlin was born in Worcester, Massachusetts. He relocated to Ohio with his family at the age of 10. Coughlin graduated from Anderson High School in Cincinnati. Coughlin has two sisters who were disabled, one from birth and one from an infection as a child. Following graduation from Miami University in 1983, he worked at ADP and Computer Identics, in operations and sales roles.

== Paycor ==
In May 1990, at age 28, Coughlin founded Paycor, Inc. to provide payroll services to the Cincinnati market. Upon Coughlin's retirement in 2019, Paycor served 30,000 clients and had 1,700 employees. Coughlin remained as chairman until fully retiring in 2020. On January 7, 2025, Paychex, Inc. announced a deal to acquire Paycor for $4.1 billion.

== Cincinnati Flying Pig Marathon ==
Coughlin first competed in the New York City Marathon in 1994. Coughlin founded a marathon in Cincinnati to raise money for charity and function as a non-profit. Cincinnati Marathon, Inc. was formed, and the first Cincinnati Flying Pig Marathon was held in May 1999. 2023 marked its 25th running, Coughlin and his family also established The Flying Pig Scholars program with Skyline Chili and other contributors, which provides scholarships each year to twenty community focused high school cross-country or track and field athletes.

== Philanthropy ==
Since retirement, Bob and his wife Jeanne have been heavily involved in supporting their communities, via their family foundation, The Bob and Jeanne Coughlin Foundation, and direct giving. The focus areas for the Coughlin's community support include youth development, environmental sustainability, and people with disabilities. Their grants and donations reach non-profit organizations predominantly in Greater Cincinnati and The Bahamas. Bob has described helping others in his communities as his “mission”.

In Cincinnati, Bob and Jeanne have given to initiatives including Great Parks, Stepping Stones and the Findlay Market in Cincinnati - Ohio's oldest public market. The Flying Pig Marathon, which Bob founded in 1999, has grown to a nationally recognized event that has raised more than $18 million for 300 charities. Bob has also been a fund holder at the Greater Cincinnati Foundation for 25 years.

The Coughlin’s philanthropy in The Bahamas began in 2018 and has provided grants to organizations including The Bahamas National Trust, the Organization for Responsible Governance, the Harbour Island Green School in Eleuthera, St. Luke’s Clinic in Staniel Cay, St. Andrew’s School in Georgetown, Exuma, and many others. The Foundation has given more than $4 million dollars to causes throughout The Bahamas impacting environmental sustainability, community engagement, and youth development.

In 2024, the Coughlins were recognized by the Bahamas National Trust (BNT) as “Conservation Champions” for their contribution to the national environmental organizations. The Conservation Champion designation, according to the BNT, recognizes “environmental guardians who have demonstrated passion and a commitment to the protection of wildlife, ecosystems and research, while raising awareness of important present-day environmental issues.” The Coughlin’s latest commitment of $600,000, announced in April 2026, brings their total giving to the BNT, which manages 33 national parks, to $1.2 million since 2021.

Additionally, Bob serves as President of the Board of Directors, Friends of Exuma, a non-profit organization he co-founded in 2020. Friends of Exuma has supported over 15 organizations in Great Exuma since inception and has disbursed over $2.5 million in charitable donations. He also serves on the Board of Directors for the Cincinnati Zoo and Botanical Gardens.

== Recognition ==
- Paycor named an Inc. Magazine Inc. 500 company in 1996
- Greater Cincinnati Chamber of Commerce Community Service Award in 1998
- Association for Corporate Growth "Deal Maker of the Year" 2005
- Association for Corporate Growth "Lifetime Achievement Award" 2023
- Junior Achievement of OKI "Greater Cincinnati Business Hall of Fame" 2023
- Greater Cincinnati Foundation Jacob E. Davis Volunteer Leadership Award 2023
- Named Conservation Champion by The Bahamas National Trust
