= Big Pig Gig =

Public art exhibition in Cincinnati, Ohio

A Big Pig Gig statue outside Fifth Third Bank headquarters

The Big Pig Gig and Big Pig Gig: Do-Re-Wee were public art exhibits on display in Cincinnati, Ohio, United States, in the summers of 2000 and 2012, respectively. Local artists and schools decorated hundreds of full-sized fiberglass pig statues and installed them throughout the downtown area. The events were organized by ArtWorks, a community art employment program.

== Background ==
The Big Pig Gig had several origin sources. It’s theorized that it’s perhaps one of many projects inspired by CowParade, which had been featured in Chicago the previous year, but others argue that it was the work of an anonymous behind the scenes activist who had never heard of Cowparade. The public version of the story was noted by Laura Pulfer, a columnist at The Cincinnati Enquirer, who wrote about seven-year-old Alexander Longi's proposal to Mayor Roxanne Qualls for an event similar to the one in Chicago.

For many years, Cincinnati was known as "Porkopolis"; this nickname came from the city's large pork interests. The nickname dates from the mid–19th century, when the Cincinnati meat packing industry led the country. In 1988, the city built a park, Bicentennial Commons, to celebrate the 200th anniversary of the city's founding and commissioned British artist Andrew Leicester to create a sculpture for the entrance. Leicester came up with four steampipes, a nod to the city's riverboat history, each topped with a winged pig; the wings are a nod to General Electric Aviation, a major presence in the city. Initial reaction was derision, but the city soon embraced the "Flying Pigs"; the city's Flying Pig Marathon was named after them. The idea to build statues of pigs recalled the marathon, the original sculptures, and the "Porkopolis" nickname. The project's rhyming name was submitted by Joyce Monger and won a naming contest.

With the support of ArtWorks and various local businesses and media outlets, the project attracted 425 entries, many of which depicted "flying pigs". Hundreds of pigs were installed downtown, while others were stationed across the Ohio River in Newport and Covington, Kentucky. They stretched north to Findlay Market, east to Eden Park, south to the Covington Cathedral, and west to Union Terminal. Participants included over 50 schools. More than 500,000 visitors brought an estimated $170 million to the city. The exhibit officially began May 14 and ended October 31.

A number of these statues have been sold on eBay for charity since the event, and many others have come to decorate the Cincinnati airport, local hotels, and other buildings. The following year saw a similar though less publicized event in which large flower pots were decorated and placed throughout downtown.

== Big Pig Gig: Do-Re-Wee ==
ArtWorks organized a smaller exhibit, which went on display from June to September 2012, to coincide with the World Choir Games. One hundred fiberglass pigs – including a pair joined by a replica Roebling Suspension Bridge – were stationed downtown and in Over-the-Rhine.

== See also ==
- CowParade
- Flying Pig Marathon
- Pigs in the City, another public art exhibit featuring pigs
