= Apoquindo =

River and settlement in Santiago, Chile

Coordinates: 33°26′29.29″S 70°27′36.77″W

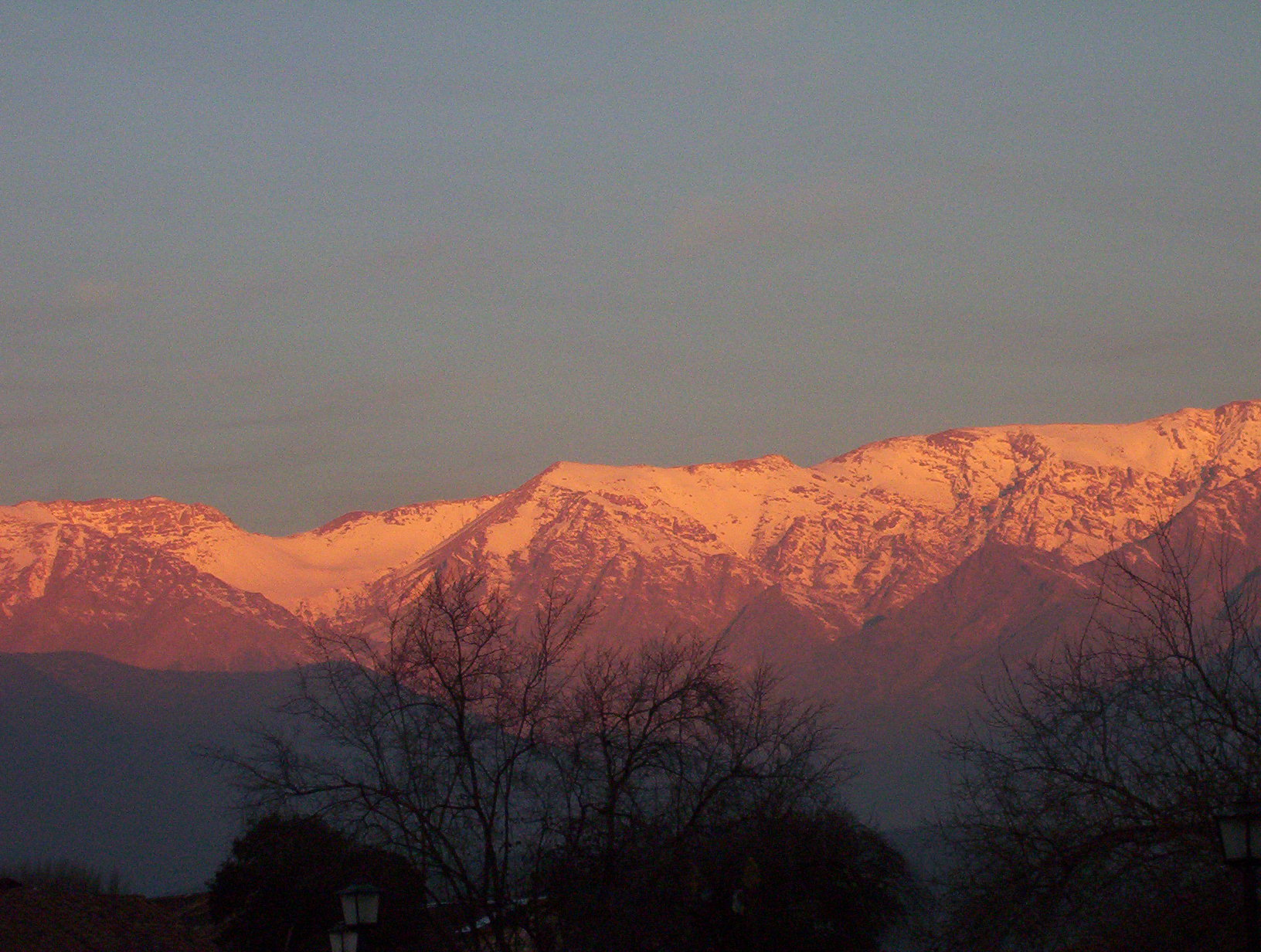
View of Sierra de Ramón from Las Condes, Santiago de Chile. At the left side is the Valle de los Quillayes, origin of Estero San Ramón and Quebrada de Ramón.

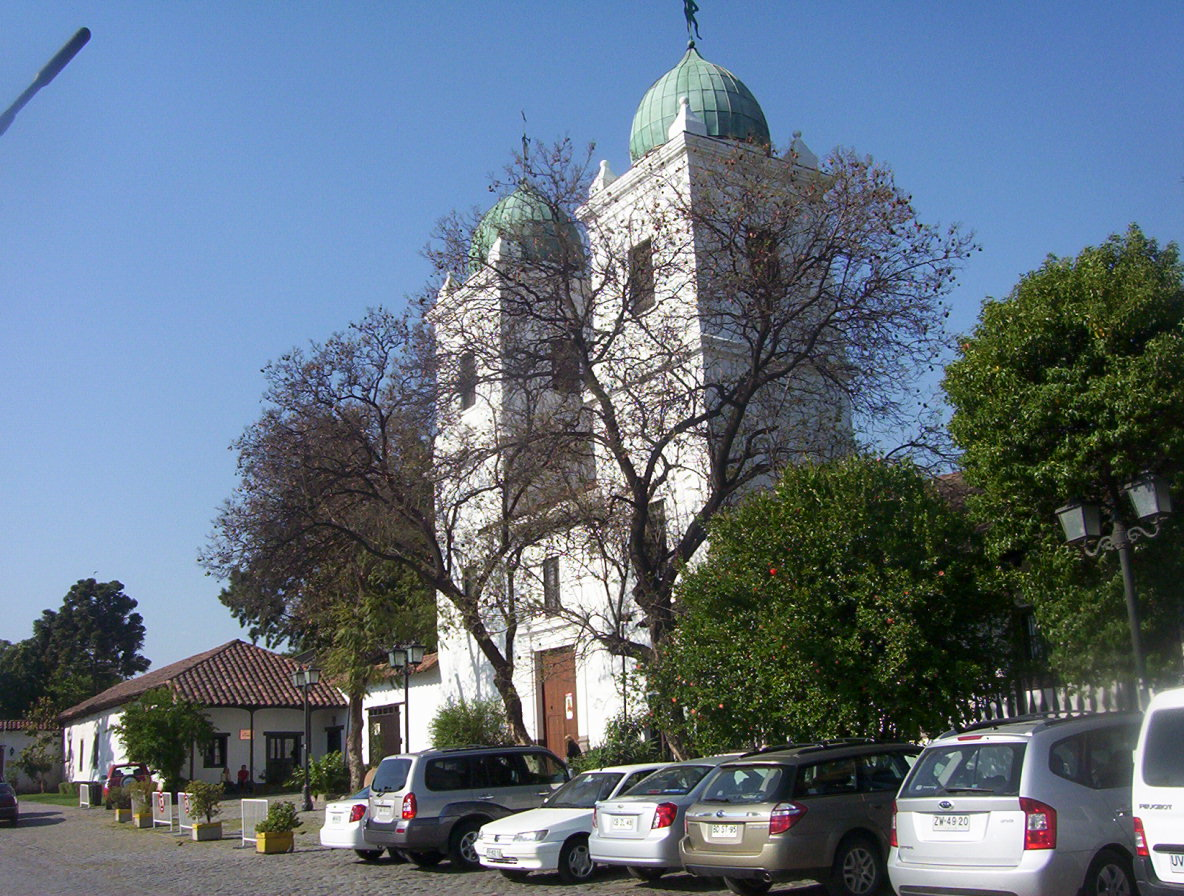
Dominican Church of San Vicente Ferrer in the Los Dominicos Square.

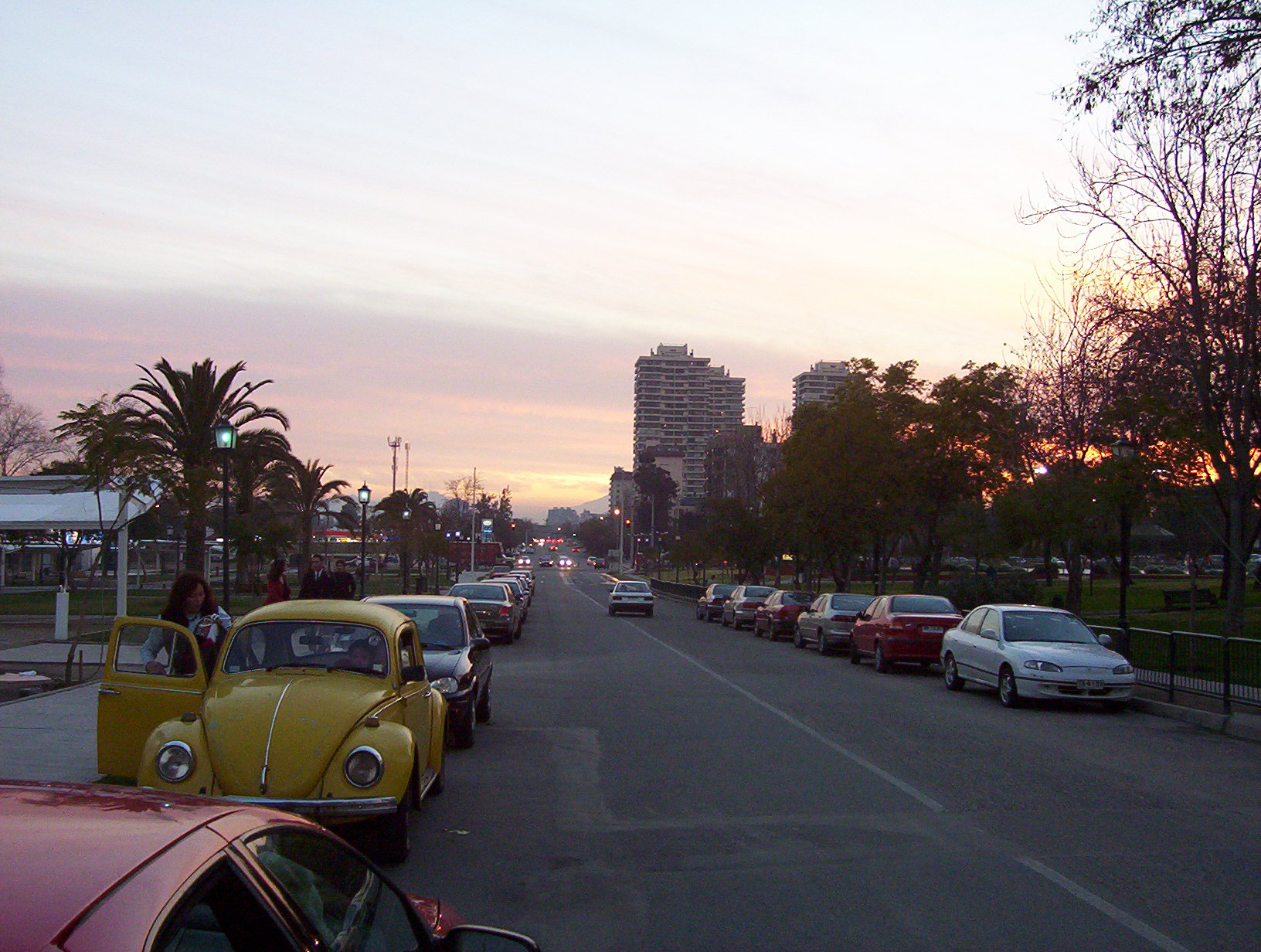
View of Apoquindo avenue from the Church of San Vicente Ferrer (Dominican Order). You can see the intersection with Avenida El Alba.

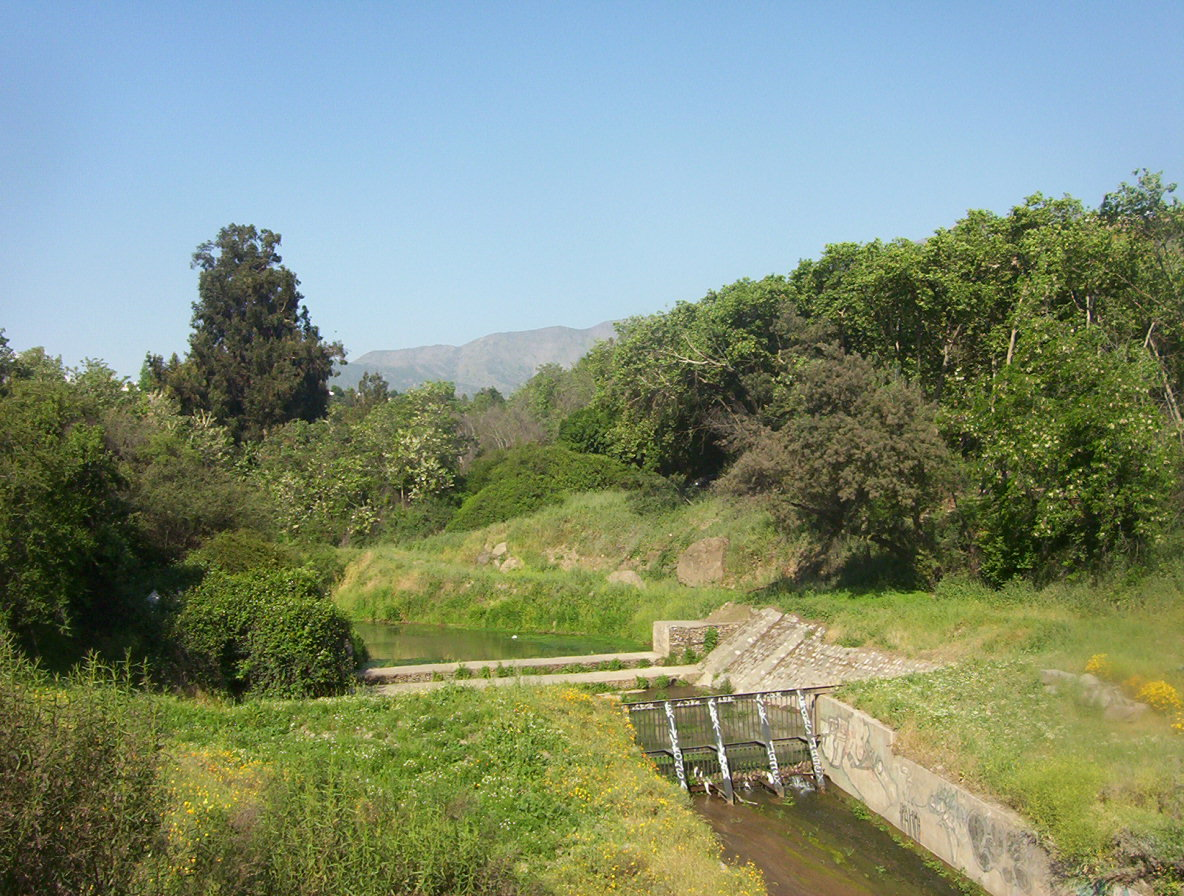
Estero Los Baños in Apoquindo, Santiago de Chile at the location where they were the ancient Apoquindo Baths.

Apoquindo (Runasimi Apuk-kintu flowers for the deity) is the name of a river and pre-Columbian settlement located east of the city of Santiago de Chile, at the foot of the foothills, in the present town of Las Condes. This settlement later became known as the Pueblo de Indios in place names Apoquindo and transferred to an estate, the Mount Apoquindo, the Apoquindo Waterfall, the Apoquindo Avenue, to the district San Carlos de Apoquindo, the Apoquindo College and other geographical landmarks and urban community.

The limits of Apoquindo are: on the north by Mapocho River in the east of Sierra de Ramon with Provincia Mount and La Cruz Mount, south of Quebrada de Ramon and the western Los Domínicos Square. At present, these limits are not as formal as the Avenida Apoquindo extends much further west (Canal San Carlos) to the border with the municipality of Providencia.

== Etymology ==
Its name comes from the Quechua language, meaning in Quechua apuk-kintu Flowers for deity ”. While its name is directly related to the worship that was made in the Inca civilization Apu of Mapocho Valley.

When the Incas conquered an area elected as Apu or the highest hill and this Apu a place of worship and sacrifice. Inca culture rendered the care and tutelage Apu the inhabitants of the valleys that were watered by their summits. This Apu was Cerro El Plomo and was harvested Apoquindo the best flowers for worship, as well from which caravans departed Apoquindo were bound to Cerro El Plomo for the qhapaq hucha.

== Bibliography ==
- Léon Echaiz, René, "Ñuñohue" Editorial Francisco de Aguirre, Santiago, 1972.
- Ossandón, Dominga and Carlos Ossandón, Guide to Santiago, 9th edition, Editorial Universitaria, Santiago, 1995
- Jaksic FM., Spatiotemporal variation patterns of plants and animals in San Carlos de Apoquindo, central Chile. Center for Advanced Research in Ecology & Biodiversity. School of Biological Sciences, Pontificia Universidad Católica de Chile. .
