= Sergio Reyes (runner) =

American athletics competitor

Sergio Reyes (b. 25 October 1981) is an American track and long-distance runner and the 2010 American National Champion in the marathon distance. He ran for Cedarville University in Ohio. He represented the United States in the 2009 World Half Marathon Championships and the 2011 World Marathon Championships. In 2009, he placed 8th in the Chicago Marathon. Reyes also won dozens of other races, including five Cincinnati Marathons, the 2010 Twin Cities Marathon and the Vermont City Marathon in 2019 and 2022. In 2009, he finished 17th at the Boston Marathon on a windy day as Ryan Hall took third behind Daniel Rono and winner Deriba Merga. He returned in 2012 on an 80-degree day to finish 12th in 2:22:06 as Geoffrey Mutai dropped out and Wesley Korir won.
