= Cerro Provincia =

Mountain in Chile

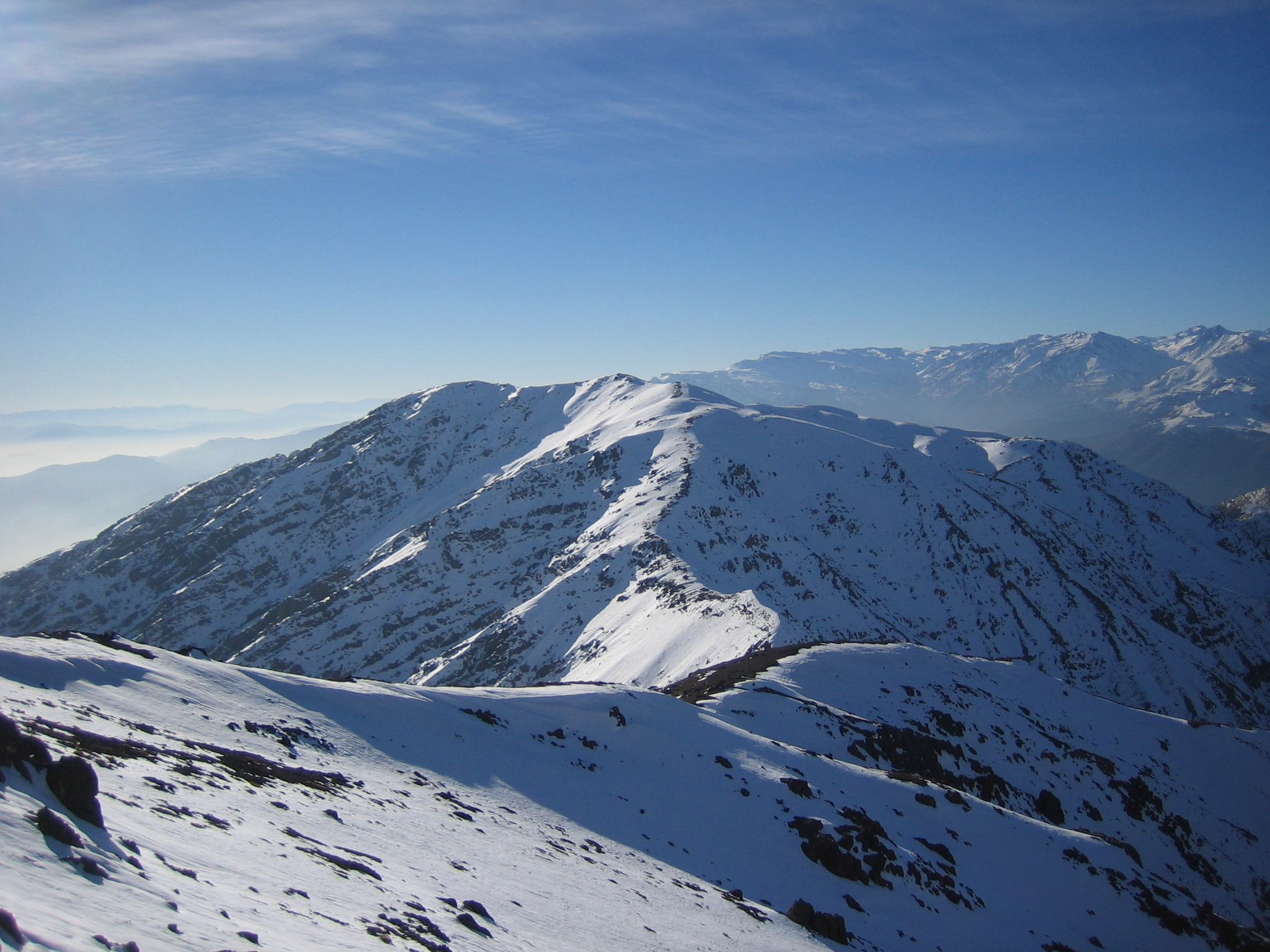
- A view from the summit of Cerro Provincia in winter

Highest point
- Elevation: 2,750 m (9,020 ft)
- Coordinates: 33°25′37″S 70°26′04″W

Geography
- Location within Chile
- Location: Chile
- Parent range: Principal Cordillera, Andes

Cerro Provincia is a mountain on the eastern side of Santiago, Chile. It is a popular climb due to its accessibility and low level of difficulty by mountaineering standards (an 'F' or 'easy' on the Alpine scale). The peak has an altitude of 2,750 metres (9,022 ft) and a climb requires an altitude gain of almost 2000 meters from the highest road-accessible point. There is a small dome-shaped refuge shelter at the summit. The peak offers views of Santiago to the west, the Andes to the east, and Cerro El Plomo to the north.

== Climbing ==
The mountain is commonly climbed from Santiago in a single day. The shortest marked and most commonly used trail to the summit starts in the valley on the north side that contains a stream feeding the Mapocho River. There are several camping sites on the lower part of the mountain, and a small refuge at the top.

The mountain is extremely hot, dry, and shadeless during the daytime in summer. However, nights at the summit can be near freezing even in the hottest days of the summer.

== Flora and fauna ==
Flora and fauna on the mountain include cacti, small shrubs, short trees, lizards, occasional viscachas, and birds, including hawks and condors. There are also feral horses, donkeys and cows.

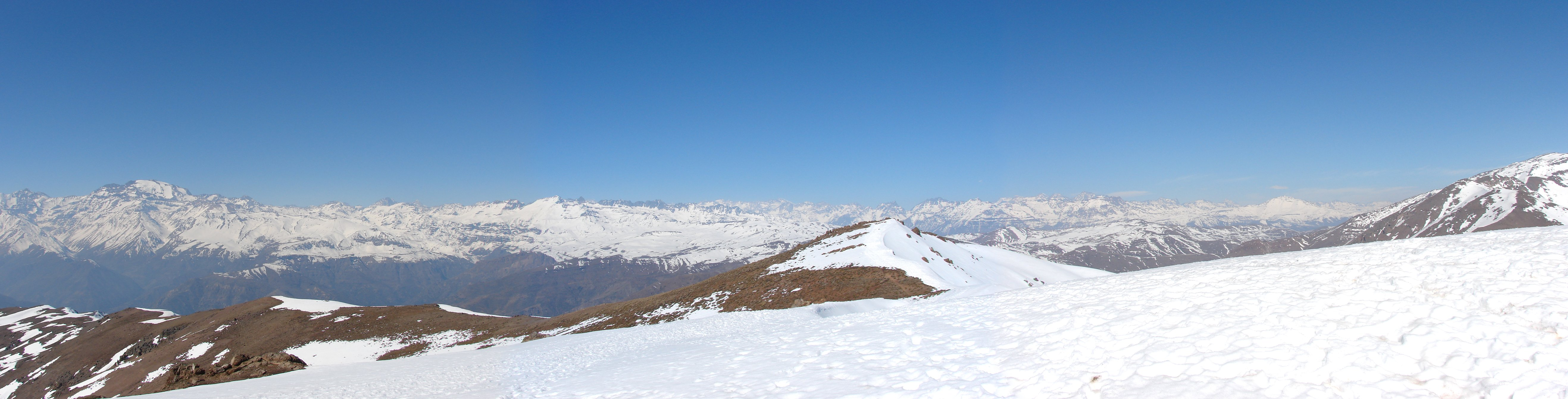
Panoramic view from near the summit of Cerro Provincia looking towards the east. Cerro El Plomo is on the left, and part of Cerro San Ramón is on the right.
