= Cerro El Plomo =

Mountain in Chile

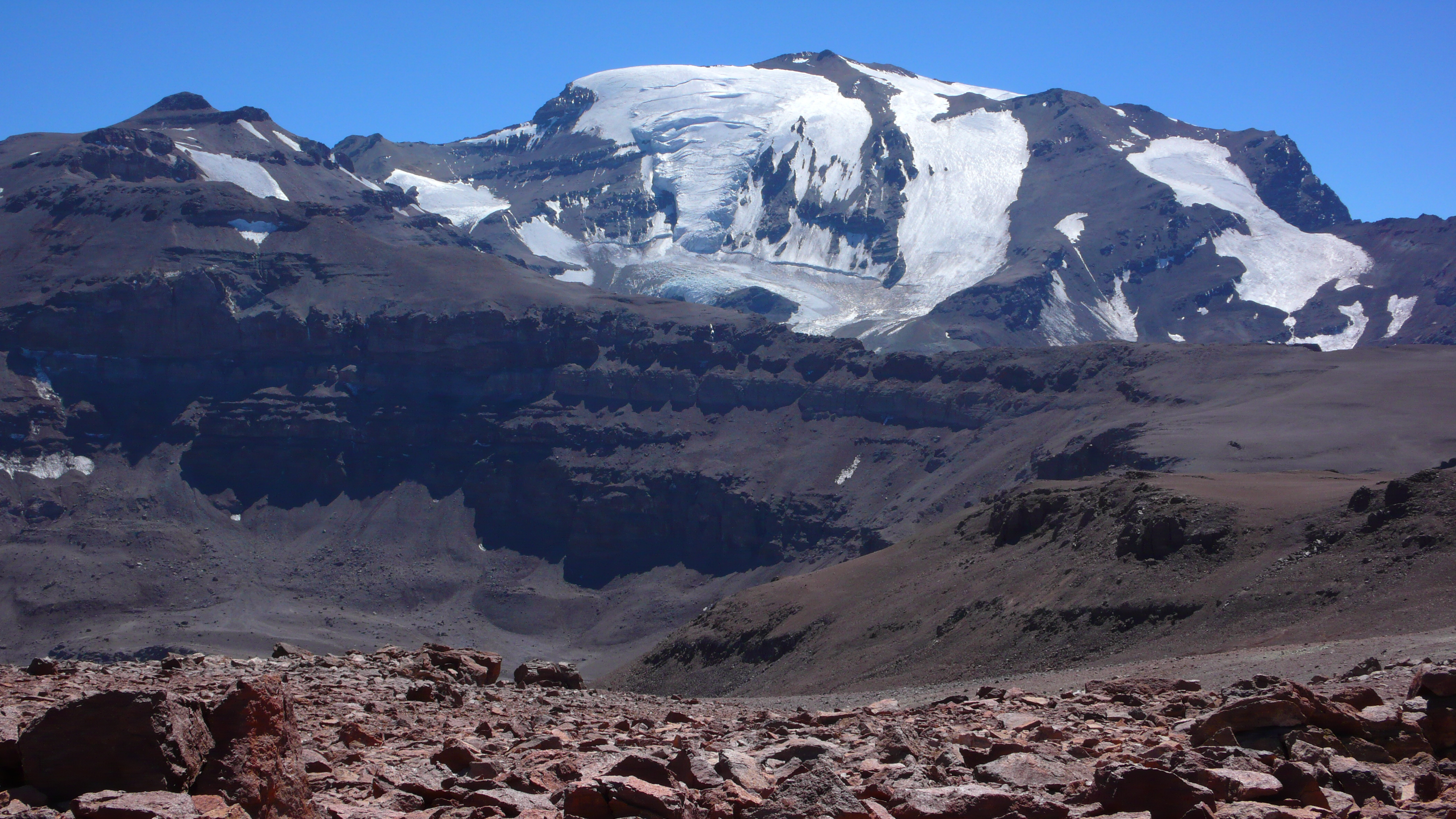
- The glaciated south-west face, visible from Santiago, with Cerro Leonera to the left

Highest point
- Elevation: 5,444 m (17,861 ft)
- Prominence: 936 m (3,071 ft)
- Coordinates: 33°13′58″S 70°12′44″W

Geography
- Location within Chile
- Location: Chile
- Parent range: Andes

Cerro El Plomo is a mountain in the Andes near Santiago, Chile. With an elevation of 5,444 metres (17,861 ft), it is the highest peak visible from Santiago on clear days. Climbing the mountain is popular during the local summer, between November and March. In spring (September to November), soil conditions have abundant snow on the approach. The most favorable season for climbing is typically from January to March, when the approach is largely snow-free and the climate is more stable. The Incas are known to have climbed to its summit periodically in the 15th century. The first European ascent of the mountain was by Gustav Brandt and Rudolph Lucke in 1896.

During a flight from Santiago, Chile, to Mendoza, Argentina, on 16 July 1932, the Pan American-Grace Airways (Panagra) Ford Trimotor San José crashed on Cerro El Plomo during a severe snowstorm, killing all nine people on board. Buried in ice and snow, its wreckage remained undiscovered until March 1934.

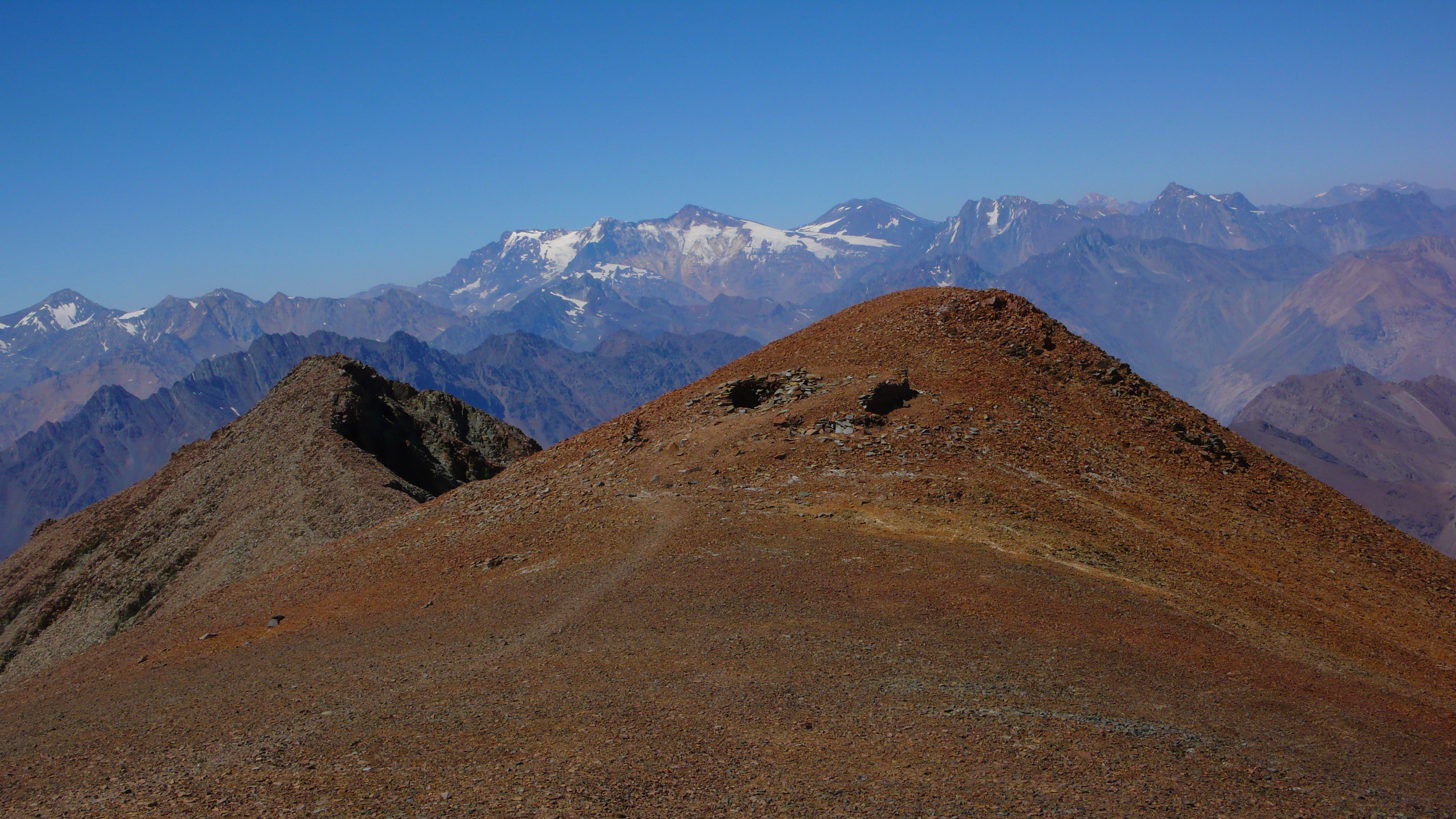
The site where the mummy was found

== Plomo Mummy ==
The mountain was used as a ceremonial site by the Incas. The mountain made headlines in 1954 when a mummy of an approximately nine-year-old child was found on the summit. The mummy resides in the Museo Nacional de Historia Natural in Santiago, Chile.

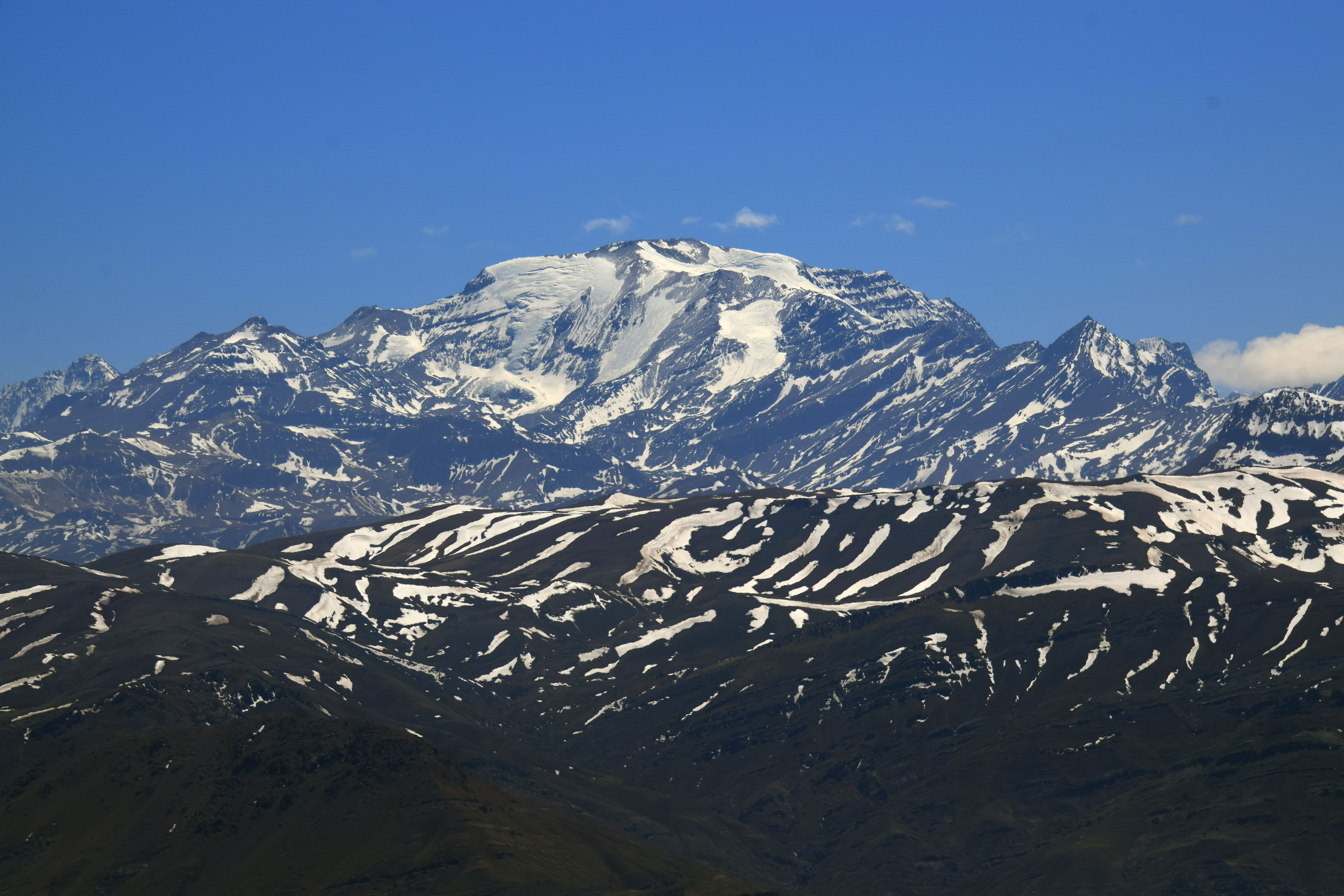
El Plomo mountain, in Central Chile, seen from the south

== Gallery ==
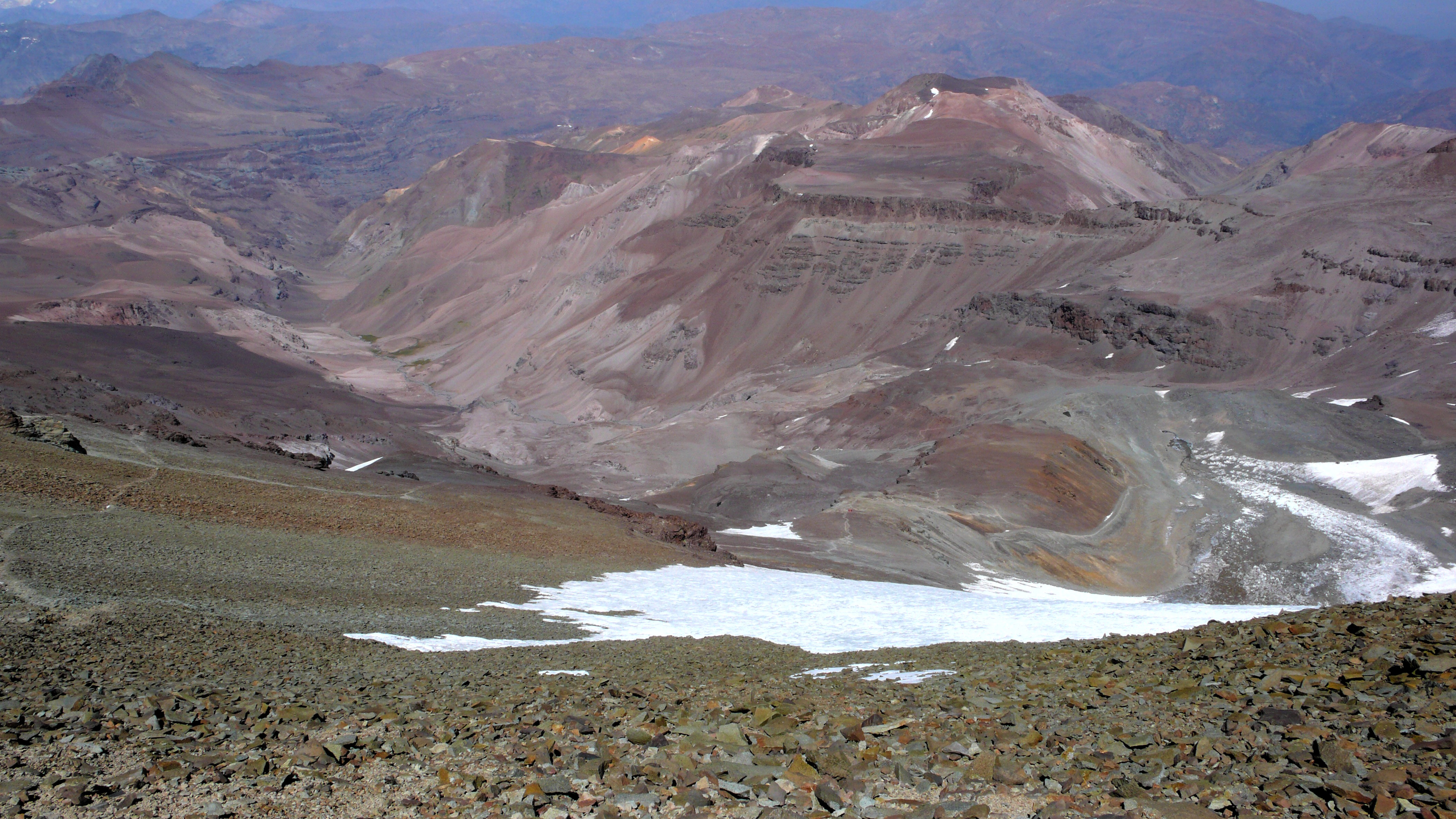
Normal route from the Piedra Numerada base camp.

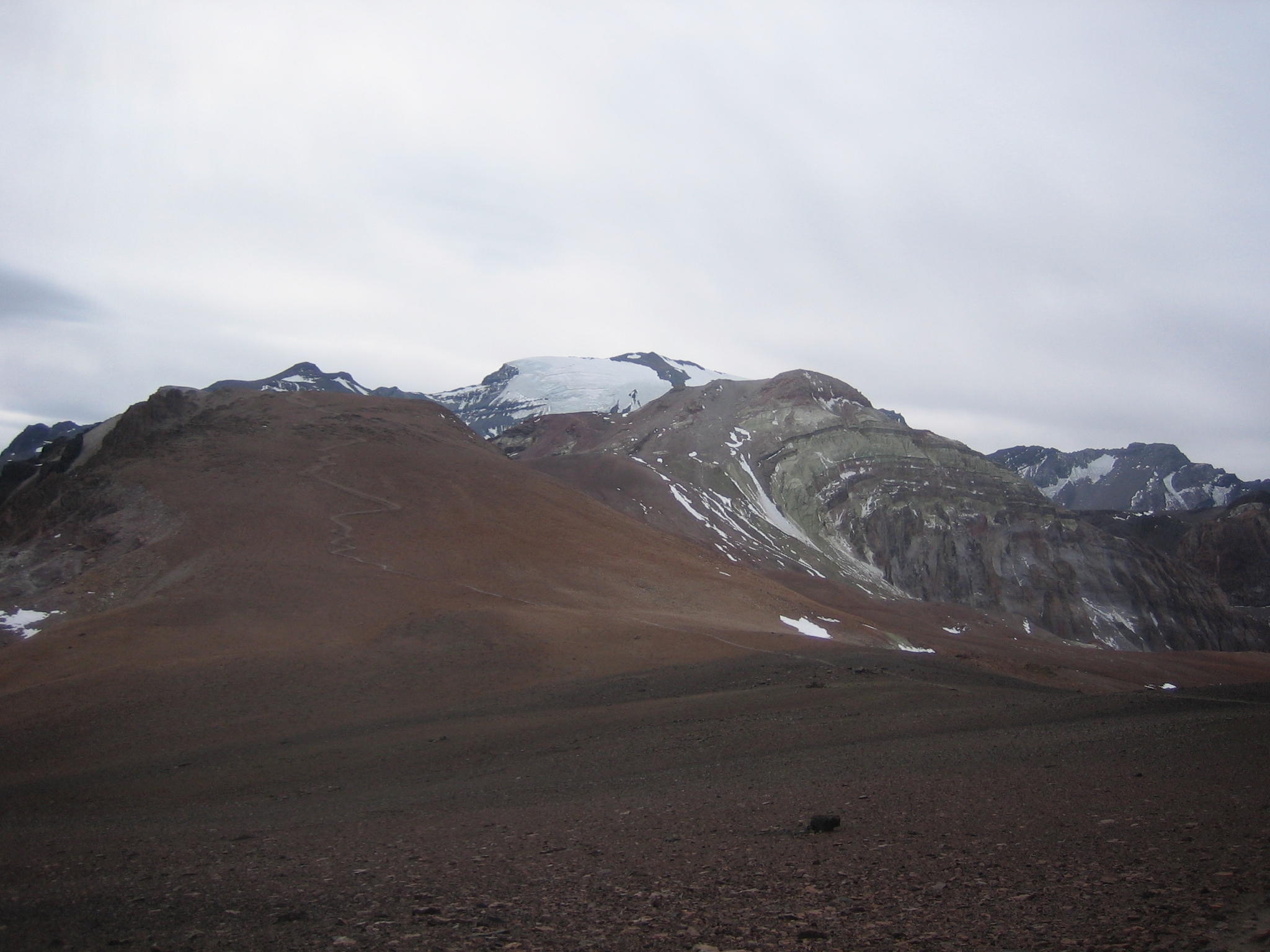

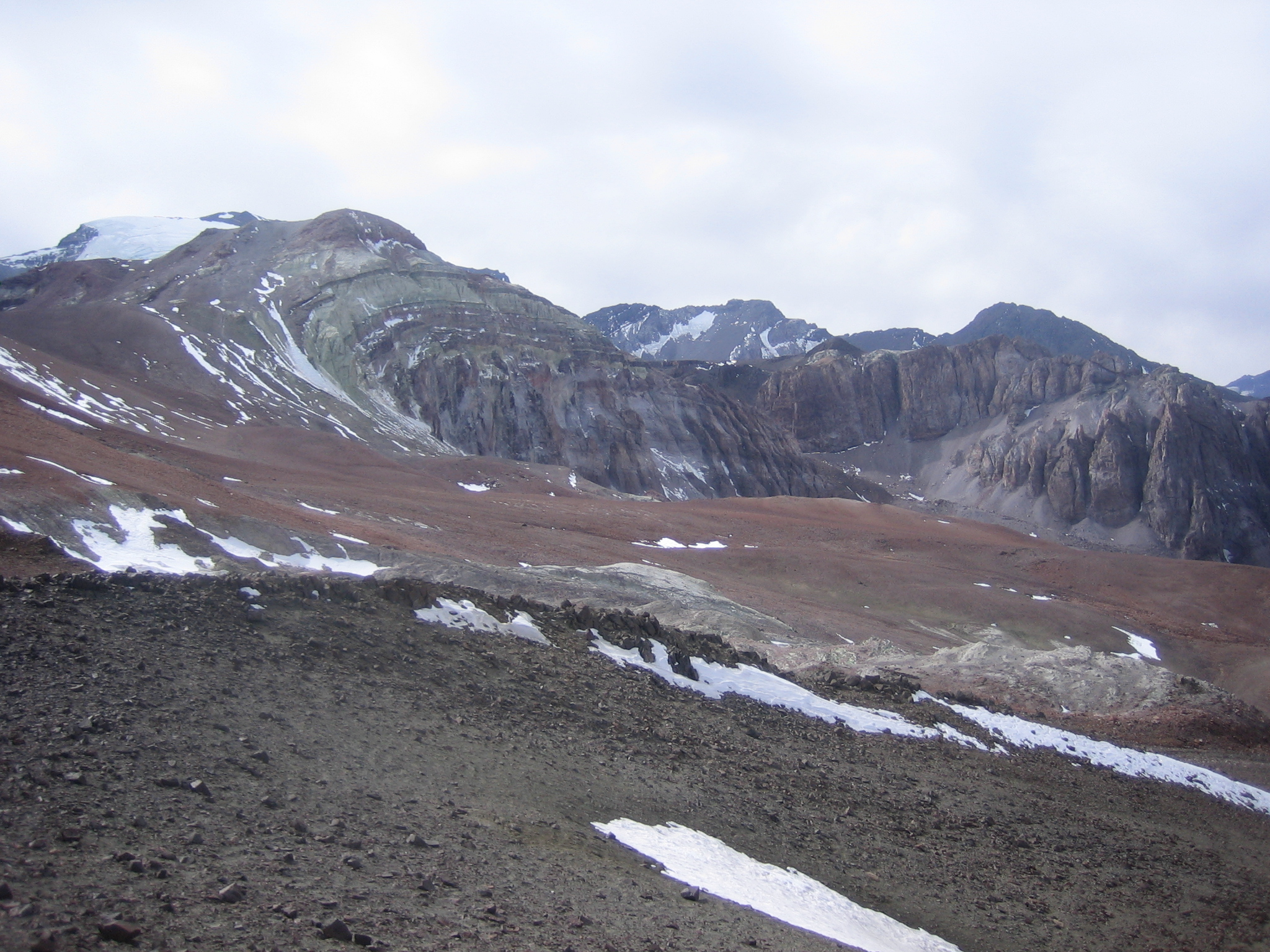

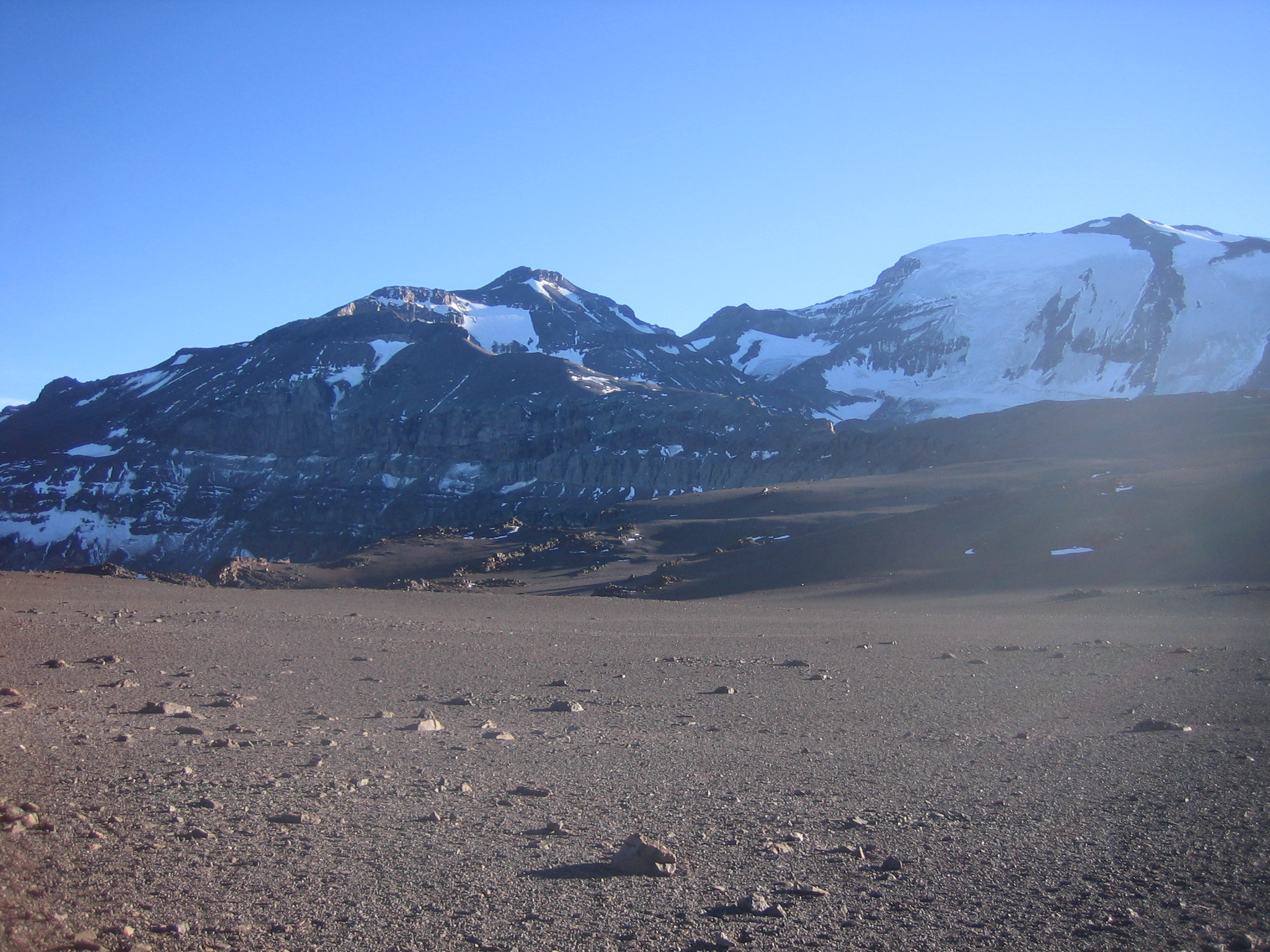

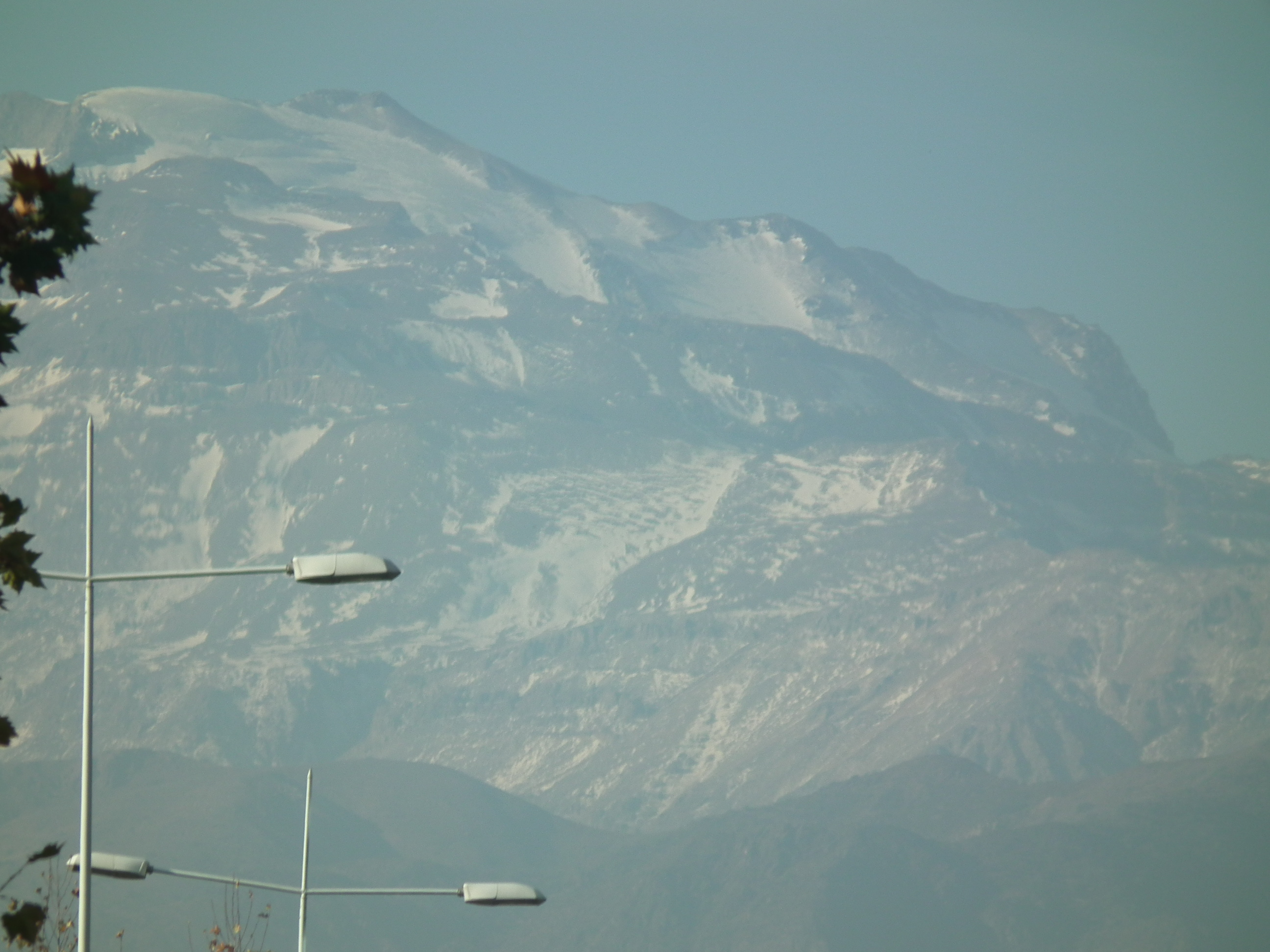
Cerro El Plomo from Apoquindo Ave., partially occluded by Cerro Leonera.
