= Association for Corporate Growth =

International Organization

The Association for Corporate Growth (ACG) is an organization providing a global "community" for mergers and acquisitions and corporate growth professionals. Founded in 1954, ACG has grown to more than 14,500 members from corporations, private equity, finance, and professional service firms representing Fortune 1000, FTSE 100, and mid-market companies. There are 57 chapters in North America and Europe. These chapters meet regularly, support events and provide a forum for senior-level M&A professionals to network, share best practices and source deals.

== ACG InterGrowth ==
ACG InterGrowth is ACG's "cornerstone" networking event. It is the world's largest dealmakers conference, attracting more than 2,000 middle market M&A professionals who attend to network, source deals and learn practices in M&A. Participants include private equity professionals, intermediaries, corporate development officers, lenders, lawyers and accountants.

== China International Private Equity Forum ==
ACG also annually co-hosts CIPEF, China International Private Equity Forum. CIPEF is geared towards educating business persons regarding investing in China. Over a thousand Chinese companies seeking foreign investment attend, including Chinese government officials and a variety of private equity professionals, intermediaries, corporate development executives, lawyers, consultants and others interested in investing in China.

== ACG Cup ==
Several ACG chapters also host ACG Cup Competitions. The ACG Cup is a case study competition designed to give students from leading MBA programs across the country real world experience and insights into mergers and acquisitions, investment banking, financial advisory and private equity. Each case study provides students with a unique opportunity to present valuation, capital markets and M&A strategic advice to a panel of M&A professionals from within the ACG community. The competition is carried out through a series of intra-school and regional competitions, with regional winners awarded the ACG Cup title and cash awards.

== ACG CapitalLink ==
ACG also offers members access to ACG CapitalLink, powered by PitchBook Lite. ACG CapitalLink is a proprietary database of thousands of capital resources, including private equity firms, hedge funds, mezzanine investors, small business investment companies, valuation firms and M&A advisory firms, offers information on a vast array of firms and individuals.

ACG CapitalLink offers information on a vast array of firms and individuals. Updated continuously, it currently features data on approximately:

- 1,400 North American and European private equity firms
- 23,300 portfolio companies
- 11,360 private equity senior executive biographies
- 6,600 hedge funds and 37,700 private funds
- 125 mezzanine investors
- 400 small business investment companies
- 300 valuation service providers
- 1,060 M&A advisory firms

== ACG Publications ==
Middle Market Growth is the official publication of the Association for Corporate Growth. It provides coverage and analysis of the middle market, focusing on growth stories and the leading trends of the M&A world. The magazine has won several awards including a first Place “Eddie” award by Folio magazine for best in Digital Magazine 2014, silver winner from Association Trends magazine for best Trade Association Magazine 2014, and was the Bronze winner from Association Trends magazine for best Monthly Professional Society Magazine in 2013.
