= The Woodlands Marathon =

Marathon in Texas

The Woodlands Marathon is a full-course marathon based in The Woodlands, Texas. The Woodlands Marathon course is USA Track and Field and IAAF certified, which makes it a qualifier for the Boston Marathon and is considered one of the top 25 fastest courses in the country.

== About ==
In 2017, the marathon was cut short due to the course to be incomplete and shortened. The marathon was cut short by 0.8 miles as the lead motorcyclist lead the runners in the wrong direction.

In 2021, the traffic impact made streets close down for the marathon course.

Fidelity Investments was the title sponsor of the race until 2022 when Legacy Capital signed a deal to sponsor the event from 2022–2026.

The Woodlands Marathon uses amateur radio operators to assist with communications throughout the race.

== Results ==
Results for the Marathon are as follows:

Results for the Woodlands Marathon
Year	Male Winner/Times	Female Winner/Times	Total number of runners
2012	Jeffery Eggleston/2:15:41	Camille Herron/2:37:18	Males - 588, Females - 421
2013	Tirop Rich Kessio/2:26:30	Mary Akor/2:41:16	Males - 586, Females - 324
2014	Lamech Mosti/2:19:30	Dehininet Jara/2:44:57	Males - 721, Females - 515
2015	Phillip Lagat/2:19:21	Frehiwot Goshu/2:43:52	Males - 539, Females - 355
2016	Hillary Too/2:18:44	Ayantu Dakebo/2:35:21	Males - 529, Females - 345
2017	Sphamandla Nyembe/2:21:26	Melissa Hopper/2:51:39	Males - 598, Females - 351
2018	Calum Neff/2:30:15	Camille Herron/2:52:38	Males - 526, Females - 288
2019	Ryan Parrish/2:29:08	Nicole Bitter/2:58:34	Males - 619, Females - 312
2020	Benjamin Zywicki/2:26:24	Emily Parker/2:44:32	Males - 603, Females - 311
2021	Fernando Cabada/2:21:17	Michelle Parks/2:38:39	Males - 634, Females - 310
2022	Edward Kandie/2:27:40	Hannah Miller/2:38:29	Males - 568, Females - 284
2023	Jonathan Hiley/2:19:44	Adriana Zuñiga/2:47:04	Males - 576, Females - 260
2024	Dillon Breen/2:25:36	Madeleine Rouse/2:56:41	Males - 570, Females - 286
