= Cerro San Ramón =

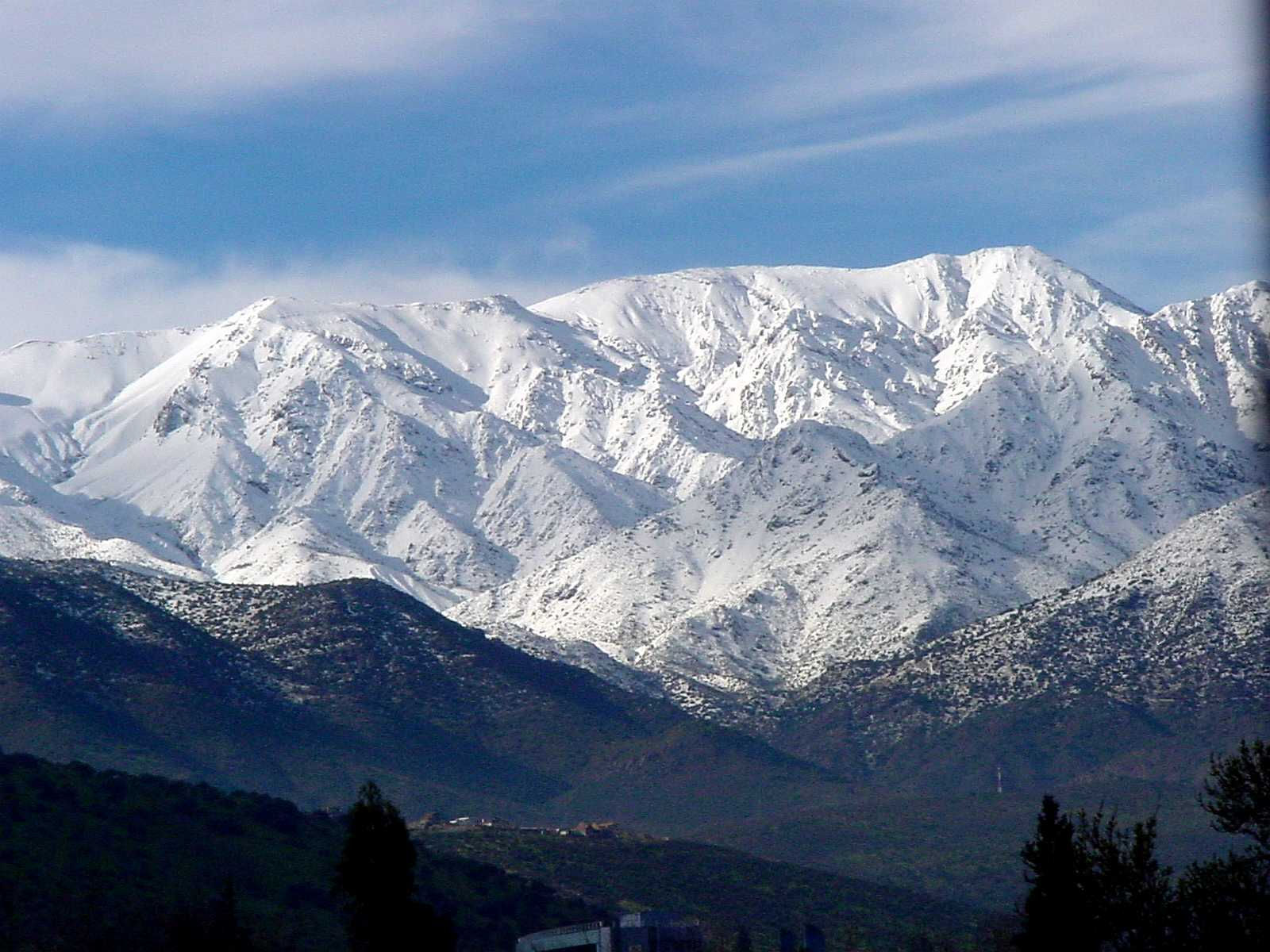
- West aspect

Highest point
- Elevation: 3,255 m (10,679 ft)
- Prominence: 923 m (3,028 ft)
- Isolation: 22.05 km (13.70 mi)
- Coordinates: 33°29′10″S 70°26′19″W

Geography
- Location within Chile Location within South America
- Interactive map of Cerro San Ramón
- Country: Chile
- Province: Santiago / Cordillera
- Protected area: Waters of Ramon Natural Park
- Parent range: Andes; Sierra de Ramón
- Topo map: IGM E-059 Hoja Farellones

Climbing
- Easiest route: Trail

Cerro San Ramón is a mountain on the boundary shared by Santiago Province and Cordillera Province in Chile.

== Description ==
Cerro San Ramón is a 3,255-meter-elevation (10,679-foot) summit in the Andes. The peak is located 18 kilometers (11.2 miles) east of the center of Santiago, and it is the highest point in the Sierra de Ramón as well as Parque Natural Aguas de Ramón (Waters of Ramón Natural Park). Precipitation runoff from the mountain's slopes drains into the Maipo River watershed. Topographic relief is significant as the summit rises 2,450 meters (8,038 ft) above the city of Peñalolén in six kilometers (3.7 miles), and 2,425 meters (7,956 ft) above the Maipo River in nine kilometers (5.6 miles). A popular 23.6 km (14.7 mi) round-trip trail climbs to the summit as it gains 2,527 meters (8,293 ft) of elevation. The nearest higher peak is Cerro Colorado, 22 kilometers (13.7 miles) to the northeast. There is no definitive explanation for who the namesake is, with one theory suggesting it could be Alonso García de Ramón (c. 1552–1610), who was the Royal Governor of Chile. In 2016, stone structures known as pircas and fragments of ceramic vessels of Inca origin were discovered near the top of Cerro San Ramón, in the sector called Portezuelo del Inca, suggesting that the mountain was part of the Inca's sacred geography.

== Gallery ==
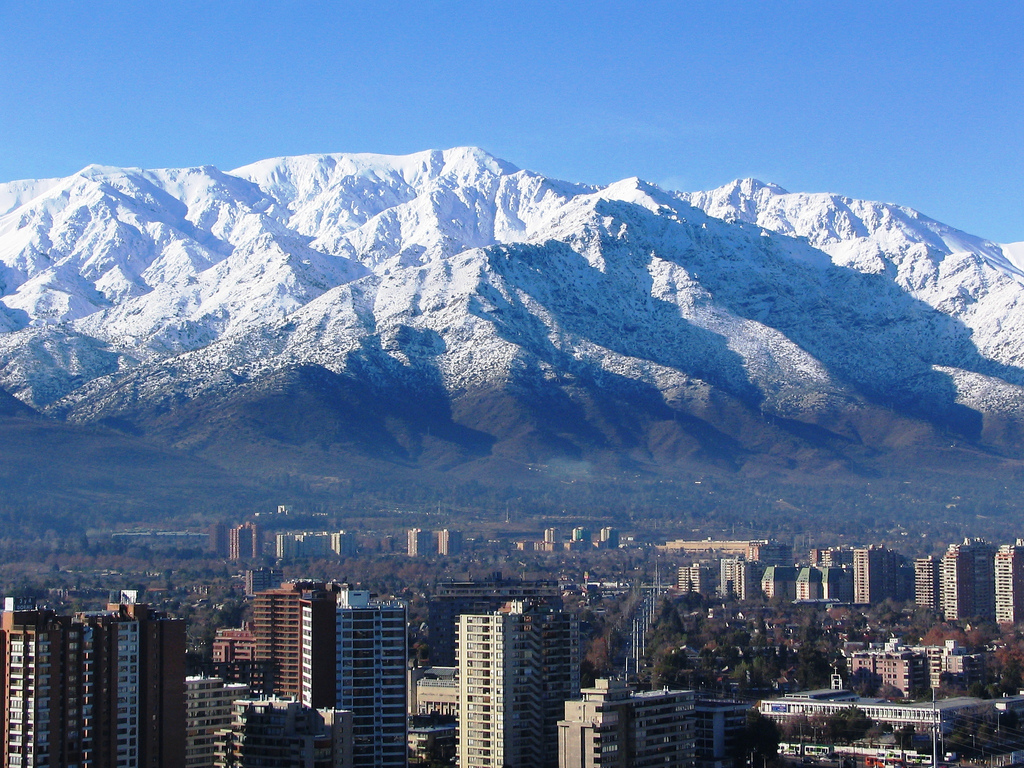
View of Cerro San Ramón from Las Condes

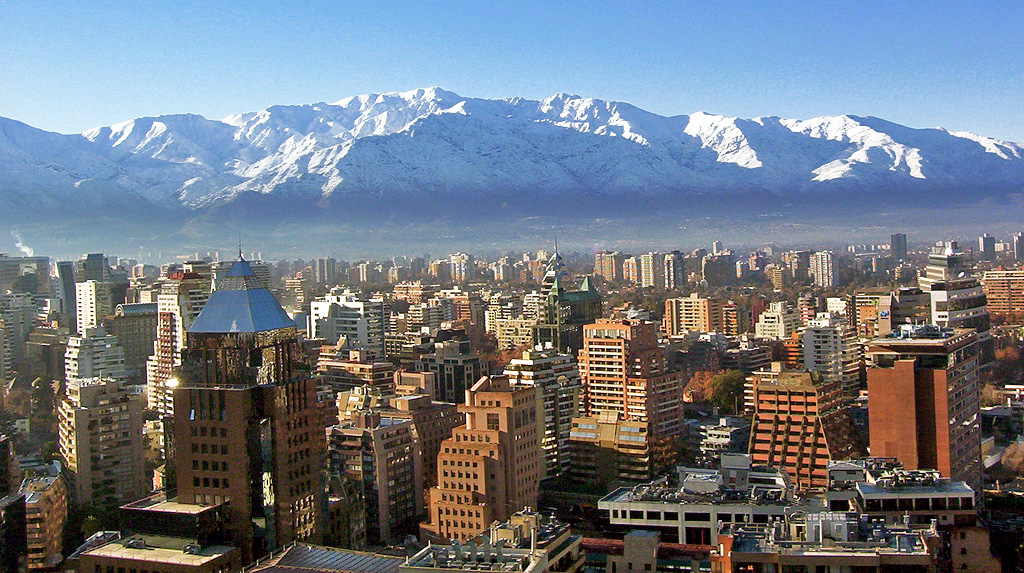
Cerro San Ramón on skyline, viewed from Santiago

== See also ==
- Principal Cordillera
