= Maegan Krifchin =

American long-distance runner

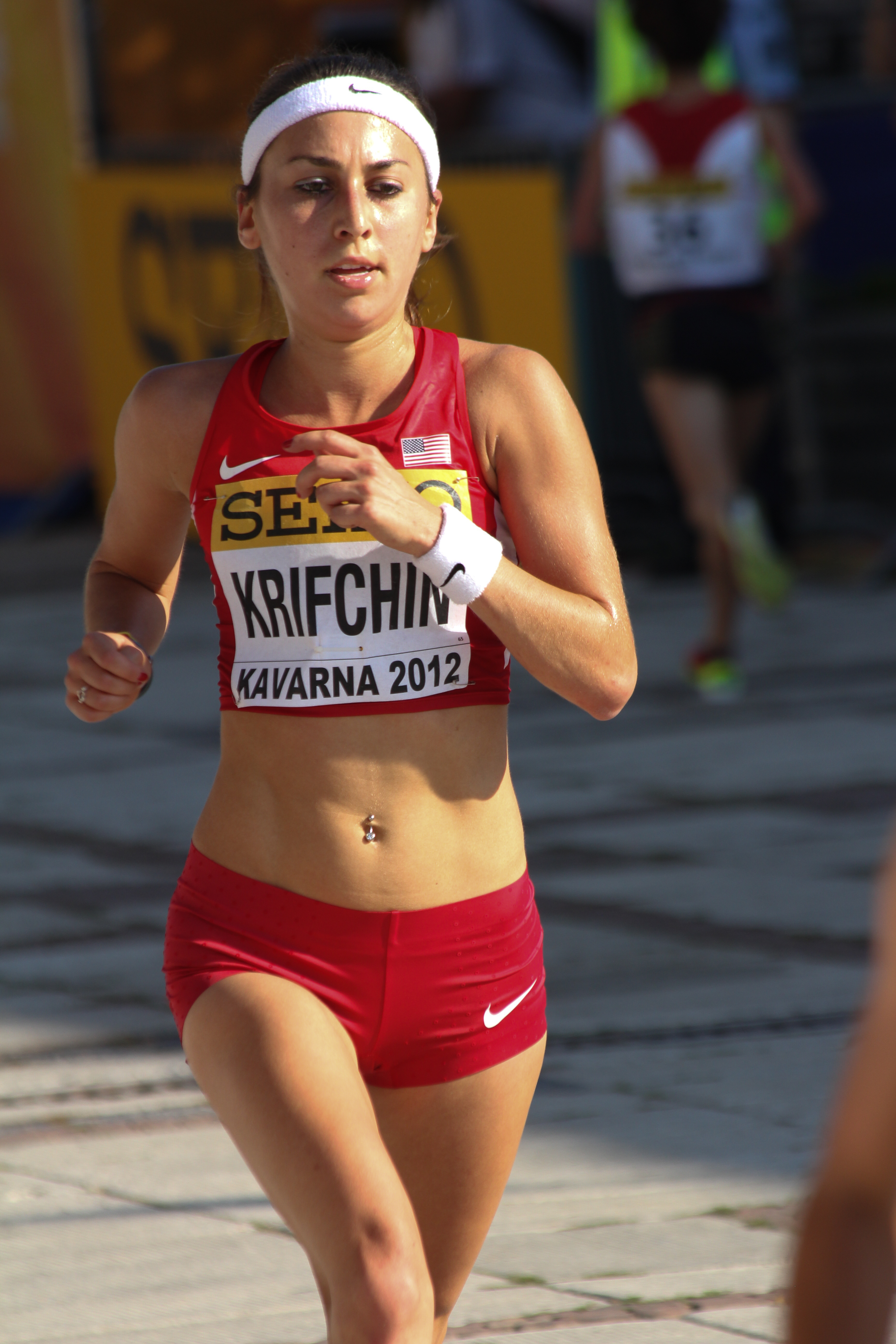
Maegan Krifchin of the USA at the 2012 World Half Marathon Championships in Kavarna, Bulgaria

Maegan Krifchin (born April 8, 1988) is an American long distance runner from Long Island, New York.

She was a high school All-American in the 800 meters. In college, she ran track and cross country for Syracuse University.

She finished 13th overall, and was the top finishing American, at the 2012 IAAF World Half Marathon Championships.

In 2015 she won the Rock 'n' Roll Philadelphia Half Marathon.

In 2016, she finished 7th at the U.S. Olympic Trials in the marathon.

Krifchin finished 7th at the 2017 Chicago Marathon.

In 2019, she won the Hotlanta Half Marathon.

She is married to elite distance runner and engineering professor, Matt McDonald.
