= 2024 United States Olympic trials (marathon) =

2024 United States Olympic Team Trials - Marathon
- Dates: February 3, 2024
- Host city: Orlando, Florida
- Level: Senior
- Type: Outdoor
- Events: 2 (men: 1; women: 1)

The 2024 U.S. Olympic Team Trials – Marathon was held on Saturday, February 3, 2024, in Orlando, Florida, to determine the American athletes who will compete in the marathon event at the 2024 Summer Olympics in Paris, France. The race was hosted by the City of Orlando in partnership with Orange County, Track Shack Events, the Greater Orlando Sports Commission, USA Track & Field, and the United States Olympic & Paralympic Committee.

== Qualification ==
Entry standards for acceptance in the race were as follows:

Men's Marathon: 2:18:00

Men's Half Marathon: 1:03:00

Women's Marathon 2:37:00

Women's Half Marathon: 1:12:00

Qualifying performances must have occurred between January 1, 2022 and December 5, 2023 on a USATF-certified course. In total, 220 men qualified via a marathon time, while only 7 gained entry with a half marathon time. For women, 158 achieved the marathon standard and only 15 hit the half marathon mark. The total number of female qualifiers dropped from 512 in the 2020 United States Olympic Trials (marathon) to 173 in 2024, due mainly to the marathon entry standard dropping 8 minutes. On the men's side, the 227 qualifiers was a decrease of only 33 relative to 2020.

== Schedule ==
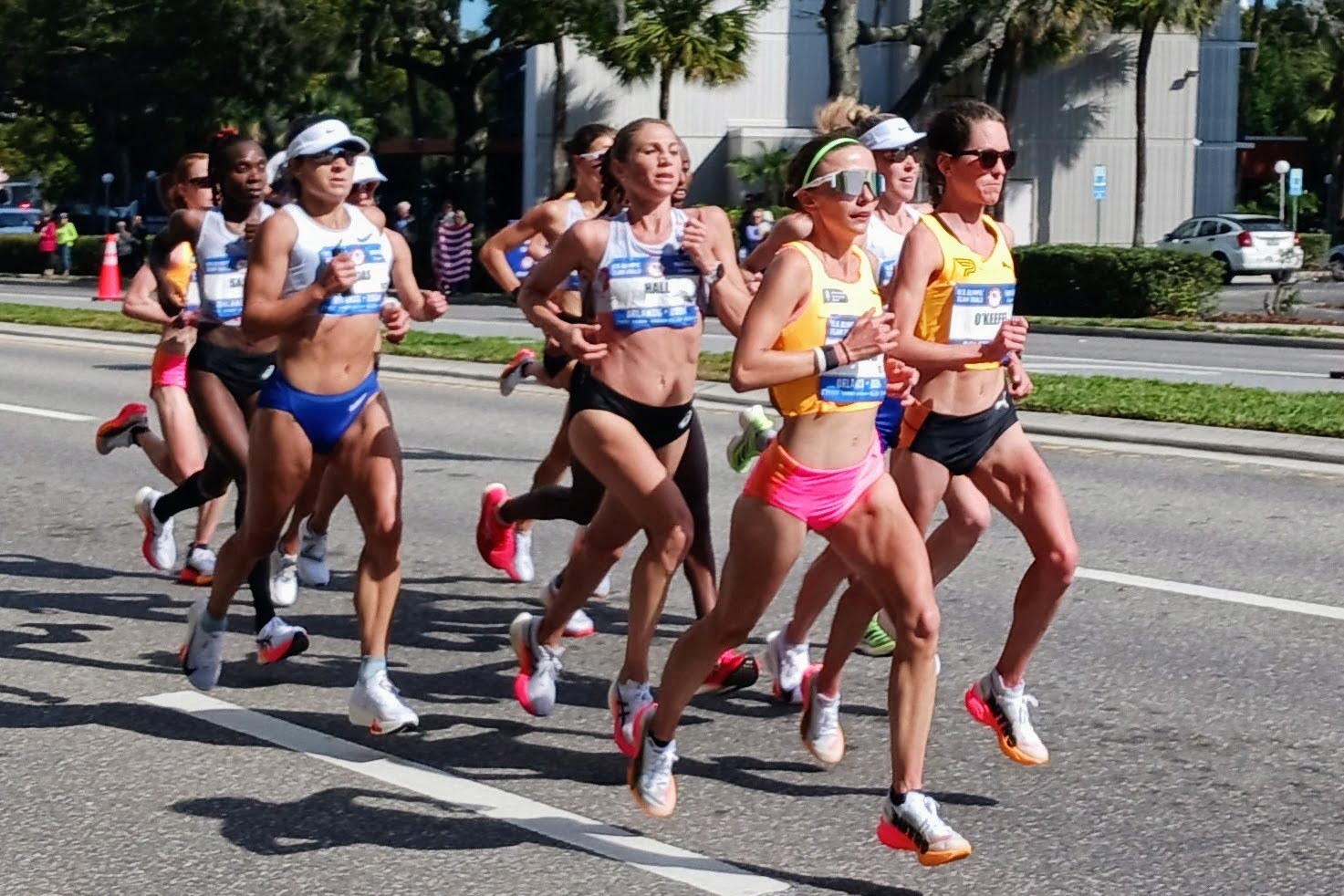
The lead group of female runners at mile 11.

Event schedule
SATURDAY, February 3, 2024
Television
Time (EST)	Event	Division	Round
10:10 a.m.	Marathon	Men	Final
10:20 a.m.	Marathon	Women	Final

== Spectators ==
Approximately 100,000 people watched the race from the streets of downtown Orlando. The race was broadcast live on NBC and Peacock and attracted 1.6 million viewers.

== Results ==
Men's Marathon
Place	Athlete	Time
1st place, gold medalist(s)	Conner Mantz	2:09:05
2nd place, silver medalist(s)	Clayton Young	2:09:06
3rd place, bronze medalist(s)	Leonard Korir	2:09:57
4	Elkanah Kibet	2:10:02
5	CJ Albertson	2:10:07
6	Zach Panning	2:10:50
7	Nathan Martin	2:11:00
8	Josh Izewski	2:11:09
9	Reed Fischer	2:11:34
10	Colin Bennie	2:12:17
11	Abbabiya Simbassa	2:12:21
12	Connor Winter	2:13:03
13	Connor Weaver	2:13:56
14	Futsum Zienasellassie	2:13:58
15	Daniel Mesfun	2:14:04
16	Galen Rupp	2:14:07
17	Josh Kalapos	2:14:26
18	Lyle O'Brien	2:14:29
19	Frank Lara	2:14:55
20	Colin Mickow	2:14:59
21	Jacob Heslington	2:15:12
22	Habtamu Cheney	2:15:43
23	Sydney Gidabuday	2:15:51
24	Nick Hauger	2:15:56
25	Nadir Yusuf	2:16:15
26	Jerod Broadbooks	2:16:20
27	Garret Lee	2:16:35
28	Joel Reichow	2:16:37
29	Turner Wiley	2:16:42
30	Julian Heninger	2:16:45
31	Wilkerson Given	2:16:51
32	Tai Smith	2:16:54
33	Alan Peterson	2:16:55
34	Ben Payne	2:17:05
35	Louis Serafini	2:17:09
36	Benjamin Robert Kendell	2:17:23
37	Jon Phillips	2:17:49
38	Jonathan Aziz	2:17:50
39	Zachary Holden	2:17:50
40	Clint McKelvey	2:17:54
41	Chase Weaverling	2:17:54
42	Spencer Bossi-Johnson	2:18:15
43	Alex Burks	2:18:28
44	Malcolm Richards	2:18:32
45	Ben Schneiderman	2:18:43
46	Jack Mastandrea	2:18:46
47	Wesley Robinson	2:18:50
48	Caleb Kerr	2:18:50
49	Nico Montanez	2:19:09
50	Roman Kirkov	2:19:15
51	John Dewitt	2:19:16
52	Jacob Shiohira	2:19:26
53	Awet Beraki	2:19:32
54	Benjamin Decker	2:19:35
55	Matt Gillette	2:19:42
56	Shadrack Kipchirchir	2:20:01
57	Michael Duggan	2:20:03
58	Kevin McDonnell	2:20:10
59	Martin Hehir	2:20:22
60	Aidan Reed	2:20:29
61	Kevin Koski	2:20:34
62	Afewerki Zeru	2:20:36
63	Will Norris	2:20:39
64	Danny Docherty	2:20:41
65	Matt McDonald	2:20:45
66	Michael Blaszczyk	2:20:49
67	Nick Wolk	2:20:53
68	Colin Martin	2:20:55
69	Matt Llano	2:20:58
70	Marcos Bailon	2:21:07
71	Prescott Leach	2:21:07
72	Dominic Hockenbury	2:21:15
73	Dylan Marx	2:21:34
74	David Fuentes	2:21:37
75	Jesse Joseph	2:21:42
76	Jackson Neff	2:21:47
77	Tyler Pence	2:21:49
78	Alberto Mena	2:21:50
79	Mitchell Klingler	2:21:55
80	Mason Jones	2:21:58
81	Alex Norstrom	2:21:59
82	William Loevner	2:22:10
83	Oscar Medina	2:22:13
84	Joost Plaetinck	2:22:19
85	Grayson Hough	2:22:23
86	Jordan Daniel	2:22:25
87	Ryder Searle	2:22:29
88	James Withers	2:22:32
89	Joe Whelan	2:22:37
90	Riley Cook	2:22:53
91	Sam Geha	2:22:55
92	Jake Ritter	2:22:58
93	Scott Nelson	2:23:05
94	Kevin Salvano	2:23:13
95	Charlie Sweeney	2:23:15
96	Jonathan Mott	2:23:19
97	Ryan Cutter	2:23:24
98	Johnny Rutford	2:23:37
99	Ryan Jara	2:23:37
100	Duriel Hardy	2:23:43
101	Andrew McCann	2:23:45
102	Brian Harvey	2:23:47
103	John McGowan	2:23:54
104	Tyler McCandless	2:23:57
105	Zachary Ornelas	2:24:08
106	Medhane Woldu	2:24:11
107	Austin Bogina	2:24:17
108	Jesse Davis	2:24:17
109	Marcus Graham	2:24:24
110	Ryan Root	2:24:33
111	Eddie Mulder	2:24:43
112	Erik Linden	2:24:59
113	Owen Ritz	2:25:24
114	Adam Wollant	2:25:26
115	Evan Landes	2:25:28
116	Donald Cowart	2:25:33
117	Paxton Smith	2:25:38
118	Phillip Reid	2:25:41
119	Spencer Friske	2:25:44
120	Mark Messmer	2:25:51
121	Dylan Belles	2:25:59
122	Tyler Jermann	2:26:01
123	Mitchell Ammons	2:26:03
124	Joseph Trojan	2:26:08
125	Henry Sterling	2:27:14
126	Tom Slattery	2:27:18
127	Connor Rocket	2:27:24
128	Brendan Martin	2:27:27
129	Dan Vassallo	2:27:31
130	Travis Morrison	2:28:06
131	Zac Hine	2:28:07
132	Daniel Schubert	2:28:10
133	Jarrod Ottman	2:28:31
134	Chad Beyer	2:28:59
135	Jason Weitzel	2:29:26
136	Carmeron Dickson	2:29:30
137	Matt Lenehan	2:30:23
138	Johnny Hogue	2:30:47
139	Kurt Roeser	2:30:55
140	Noah Steffen	2:31:00
141	Henry Williams	2:31:37
142	Swarnjit Boyal	2:32:31
143	Pardon Ndhlovu	2:33:26
144	Adam Sjolund	2:33:57
145	Kevin Lewis	2:36:34
146	Zachary Ripley	2:37:48
147	Tyler Sickler	2:38:46
148	Jakob Kintzele	2:41:57
149	Kevin Colon	2:45:10
150	Matt Rand	2:50:35
	Paul Chelimo	DNF
	Scott Fauble	DNF
	Andrew Colley	DNF
	Teshome Mekonen	DNF
	JP Flavin	DNF
	Jacob Thomson	DNF
	Shadrack Biwott	DNF
	John Raneri	DNF
	Tyler Pennel	DNF
	Abinet Adraro	DNF
	Abdi Abdirahman	DNF
	Mick Iacofano	DNF
	Sam Chelanga	DNF
	Brian Shrader	DNF
	Reid Buchanan	DNF
	Parker Stinson	DNF
	Jake Riley	DNF
	Noah Droddy	DNF
	Weston Strum	DNF
	Charlie Lawrence	DNF
	Jonas Hampton	DNF
	Emilio De La Torre	DNF
	James Quattlebaum	DNF
	Aaron Gruen	DNF
	Ian Butler	DNF
	Brendan Gregg	DNF
	Isaac Benz	DNF
	Will Cross	DNF
	T-Roy Brown	DNF
	Collin Buck	

Women's Marathon
Place	Athlete	Time
1st place, gold medalist(s)	Fiona O'Keeffe	2:22:10
2nd place, silver medalist(s)	Emily Sisson	2:22:42
3rd place, bronze medalist(s)	Dakotah Lindwurm	2:25:31
4	Jessica McClain	2:25:46
5	Sara Hall	2:26:06
6	Caroline Rotich	2:26:10
7	Makenna Myler	2:26:14
8	Lindsay Flanagan	2:26:25
9	Emily Durgin	2:27:56
10	Annie Frisbie	2:27:56
11	Desiree Linden	2:28:04
12	Savannah Berry	2:29:17
13	Molly Grabill	2:30:16
14	Sarah Sellers	2:30:17
15	Kellyn Taylor	2:30:28
16	Anne-Marie Blaney	2:30:43
17	Tristin Van Ord	2:30:46
18	Jessa Hanson	2:31:02
19	Gabriella Rooker	2:31:25
20	Maya Weigel	2:32:16
21	Amy Davis	2:33:09
22	Margaretha Montoya	2:33:12
23	Marybeth Chelanga	2:33:33
24	Roberta Groner	2:33:33
25	Jacqueline Gaughan	2:34:12
26	Katja Goldring	2:34:24
27	Andrea Pomaranski	2:34:35
28	Natosha Rogers	2:34:51
29	Brittney Feivor	2:34:53
30	Amber Zimmerman	2:34:58
31	English Tomlinson	2:35:13
32	Parley Hannan	2:35:13
33	Regan Rome	2:35:31
34	Veronica Eder	2:35:46
35	Jane Bareikis	2:35:53
36	Bria Wetsch	2:36:00
37	Katie Kellner	2:36:07
38	Grace Moore	2:36:23
39	Tori Parkinson	2:36:43
40	Kim Horner	2:36:47
41	Peyton Thomas	2:36:56
42	Allie Schaich	2:37:14
43	Abby McNulty	2:37:19
44	Sakiko Minagawa	2:37:25
45	Amanda Phillips	2:37:33
46	Sydney Devore	2:37:59
47	Peighton Meske	2:38:05
48	Rachel Hyland	2:38:12
49	Bridget Lyons	2:38:16
50	Kathryn Fluehr	2:38:20
51	Dorothy McMahan	2:38:34
52	Elizabeth Bigelow	2:38:34
53	Mackenzie Caldwell	2:38:37
54	Jessica Watychowicz	2:38:51
55	Kelsey Bruce	2:39:06
56	Carrie Verdon	2:39:25
57	Olivia Pratt	2:39:29
58	Taylor Dare	2:39:40
59	Christina Welsh	2:39:44
60	Meriah Earle	2:39:46
61	Annmarie Tuxbury	2:39:53
62	Holly Clarke	2:39:55
63	Stephanie Sherman	2:39:58
64	Elvin Kibet	2:40:03
65	Mimi Smith	2:40:09
66	Stephanie Rouse	2:40:21
67	Kathy Vandehy	2:40:29
68	Amelia Keyser-Gibson	2:40:35
69	Tammy Hsieh	2:40:36
70	Rosa Moriello	2:40:45
71	Sara Lopez	2:40:55
72	Ava Nuttall	2:41:02
73	Heather Kampf	2:41:04
74	Flannery Davis	2:41:09
75	Jeralyn Poe	2:41:15
76	Adrian Walsh	2:41:22
77	Molly Culver	2:41:52
78	Kaylee Bogina	2:42:02
79	Sarah Reiter	2:42:36
80	Megan O'Neil	2:42:51
81	Ann Pierce	2:43:04
82	Breanna Sieracki	2:43:17
83	Elizabeth Chikotas	2:43:26
84	Erin Gregoire	2:43:28
85	Kayla Lampe	2:43:32
86	Kidan Kidane	2:43:37
87	Caroline Williams	2:43:51
88	Jennifer Pope	2:43:55
89	Caroline Cole	2:44:15
90	Hailey Bowes	2:44:56
91	Lucy Dobbs	2:45:29
92	Claire Benjamin	2:45:34
93	Elaine Estes	2:45:42
94	Laura Paulsen	2:46:51
95	Sara Passani	2:46:52
96	Madison Offstein	2:46:58
97	Julia Vasquez	2:46:59
98	Hannah Becker	2:46:59
99	Kaitlyn Peale	2:47:14
100	Madeline Duhon	2:47:37
101	Stephanie Bruce	2:47:42
102	Lillian Anderson	2:48:42
103	Alexandra Greitzer	2:48:50
104	Emma Huston	2:48:55
105	Annie Heffernan	2:49:51
106	Katie Florio	2:49:52
107	Kaitlin Donner	2:50:01
108	Britney Romero	2:52:51
109	Natalie Callister	2:53:10
110	Ashlee Powers	2:54:00
111	Joanna Reyes	2:55:37
112	Kir Selert	2:58:23
113	Ariane Hendrix-Roach	2:58:30
114	Johanna Butler	3:01:31
115	Tara Welling	3:12:37
116	Sofie Schunk	3:22:26
	Keira D'Amato	DNF
	Betsy Saina	DNF
	Jenny Simpson	DNF
	Aliphine Tuliamuk	DNF
	Laura Thweatt	DNF
	Erika Kemp	DNF
	Nell Rojas	DNF
	Elena Hayday	DNF
	Sara Vaughn	DNF
	Sarah Pagano Buchanan	DNF
	Jessie Cardin	DNF
	Lauren Hagans	DNF
	Molly Huddle	DNF
	Katrina Spratford	DNF
	Molly Bookmyer	DNF
	Jaci Smith	DNF
	Regan Rome	DNF
	Mary Denholm	DNF
	Kelsey Pontius	DNF
	Isabel Hebner	DNF
	Monica Hebner	DNF
	Maegan Krifchin	DNF

== Men's Race ==
On the men's side pre-race favorites to make the team included two-time defending champion Rupp, Mantz, Young, Korir, Panning, Fauble, and Chelanga. Paul Chelimo, a two-time olympic medalist in the 5000m would be making his marathon debut and hoping to get on the team. Many considered Conner Mantz to be the favorite to win the trials, given his consistency in the distance over the last few years and being the top American in a deep Chicago marathon race in 2023.

It was a warm and sunny day in Orlando, with a temperature of 63 degrees at the start and 70 at the finish. Of the 200 men who started the race, 150 finished and 50 dropped out. At the front, Panning took the lead after 5 miles and pushed the pace. By 20 miles, he had whittled the leaders down to himself, Mantz, and Young. After running many miles in the 4:40s and 4:50s range, Panning would fade badly over the final 5K. Training partners Mantz and Young went 1-2 to secure their olympic spots. Leonard Korir would run down Elkanah Kibet over the last mile to take third. Since the US only had two spots unlocked by Mantz and Young achieving the olympic standard in Chicago 2023, Korir would have to wait to see if his ranking held up for him to go to the olympics. In June, Korir was confirmed to have earned the olympic spot.
