= Roberta Groner =

American long-distance runner

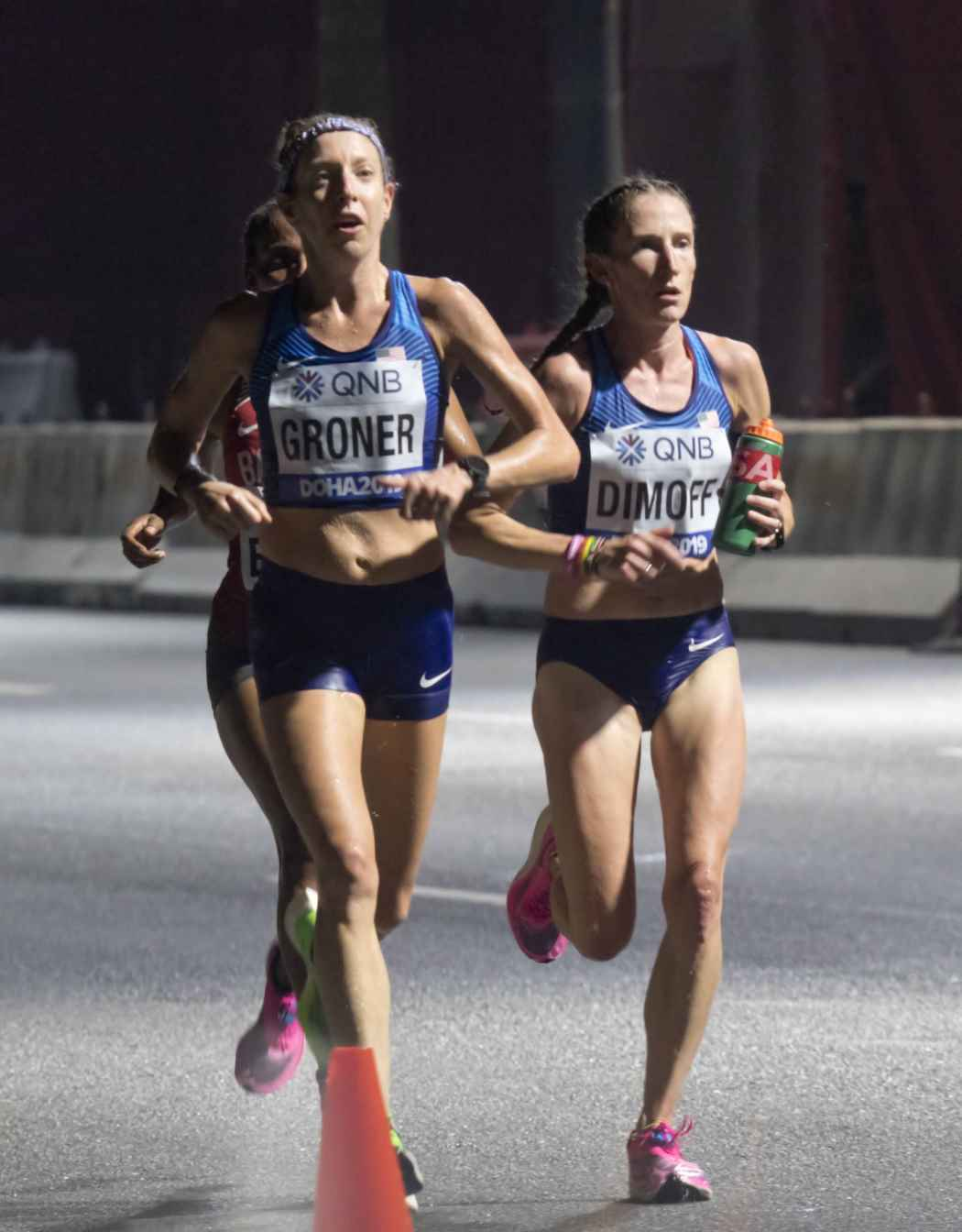
- Groner and Dimoff at the 2019 World Athletics Championships

Personal information
- Nationality: American
- Born: January 4, 1978 (age 48) Pittsburgh, Pennsylvania

Sport
- Sport: Athletics
- Events: Marathon, half marathon
- Club: Central Park Track Club

Achievements and titles
- Personal bests: Marathon: 2:29:09; Half Marathon: 1:11:34; 10 km: 33:31

Roberta Groner (born January 4, 1978) is an American athlete competing in long-distance events.

== Early life ==
Born and raised in Pittsburgh, Pennsylvania, Groner competed in running during her four years at Saint Francis University. She stopped running after she graduated, as she found she no longer enjoyed it, got married and had three children.

== Career ==
Groner began running again when she was thirty years old, and she completed her first marathon in 2011. She won the Mohawk Hudson River Marathon in 2016 with a time of 2:37:54. At this time she was coached by Hector Matos. Since 2019, her coach has been Steve Magness. Her personal best on marathon is 2:29:09, from Rotterdam Marathon in April 2019. Representing the United States at the 2019 World Athletics Championships in Doha, she placed sixth in the women's marathon.

USATF New York named Groner the Long Distance Runner of the Year in three consecutive years (2017, 2018, and 2019).

Groner placed 24th at the 2024 United States Olympic Trials (marathon) in Orlando. She also competed in the 2020 United States Olympic Trials (marathon) in Atlanta, but did not finish.

Between her two appearances at the Olympic Trials, Groner broke the American women's record for the 45-49 age group in the half marathon, clocking a time of 1:11:27 at the 2023 Project 13.1 event in New York.

In December 2024, Groner set another American record for the 45-49 age group, as she recorded a 2:29:32 time in the Valencia Marathon.

Groner finished second at the 2026 Brooklyn Half Marathon.

Groner at age 48 ran 2:35:55 at the 2026 New York City Marathon, which qualified her for the 2028 U.S. Olympic Trials. She was the 11th American finisher and 22nd overall.

She has been a resident of Roxbury, New Jersey. As of 2023, Groner is a coach for Central Park Track Club - Tracksmith.
