= Matt Rand =

American distance runner (born 1991)

Personal information
- Born: 4 August 1991 (age 35) Cape Elizabeth, Maine, United States

Sport
- Country: United States
- Events: Marathon, half marathon
- College team: Tufts University
- Team: Valor TC Portland

Achievements and titles
- Personal best: Marathon: 2:15:34

Matt Rand (born August 4, 1991) is an American distance runner who specializes in the marathon. He competed in track and cross country for Tufts University, earning NCAA All-American honors, before transitioning to marathoning. Rand competed in the U.S. Olympic Trials in 2020 and 2024, and he serves on the board of directors for the Beach to Beacon 10K.

== Early life ==
Rand grew up in Cape Elizabeth, Maine and graduated from Cape Elizabeth High School in 2009. He played baseball and basketball while also running cross country. He attended Tufts University, where he earned NCAA All-American awards in cross country, the 10,000 meters, and the distance medley relay. While at Tufts, he was teammates and roommates with ultra-marathoner and mountaineer Tyler C. Andrews.

== Career ==
In 2017 while residing in Ozone Park, New York and competing for Central Park Track Club, Rand won the Mohawk Hudson River Marathon in Albany, NY.

Rand placed in the top 50 at the Chicago Marathon in 2016 and 2018.

He finished 25th at the 2019 Houston Marathon. In the fall at the 2019 Indianapolis Monumental Marathon, Rand placed sixth in a time of 2:18:42, which qualified him for the 2020 United States Olympic Trials (marathon).

USATF New York named Rand the 2019 Long Distance Running Athlete of the Year, following multiple wins by Meb Keflezighi and Brendan Martin.

In February 2020 while residing in Portland, Maine, Rand competed in the 2020 Olympic Trials Marathon, placing 108th of 235 men on a hilly course through downtown Atlanta.

In 2023, Rand finished eighth of over 25,000 runners in the Brooklyn Half Marathon. Over the summer, he won the Maine Men’s division at the Beach to Beacon 10K. In October, he ran the 2023 McKirdy Micro Marathon in a time of 2:17:11 to qualify for the 2024 United States Olympic Trials (marathon).

At the 2024 Olympic Trials in Orlando, Rand struggled in hot, sunny conditions. He was the last of 150 men to cross the finish line (50 of the 200 male starters dropped out). His effort was featured in an article written by Dennis Young and published by Defector.

In November 2026, Rand qualified for the 2028 U.S. Olympic Trials by running 2:15:34 at the Indianapolis Monumental Marathon.

Rand is one of four men from Maine who have competed in at least two U.S. Olympic Trials and won the Maine title at the Beach to Beacon 10K, along with Ben True, Riley Masters, and Louis Luchini. Rand serves on the Board of Directors for the Beach to Beacon 10K, which is managed by Dave McGillivray and chaired by Joan Benoit Samuelson.

== Personal ==
As of 2024, Rand lives with his wife and son in Portland, Maine and operates a stone business.
