= Alex Taylor (runner) =

American distance runner (born 1980)

Personal information
- Born: January 4, 1980 (age 46) Woodbridge, Virginia, United States

Sport
- Country: United States
- Events: Marathon, half marathon
- College team: Virginia Tech
- Team: Tracksmith Boston

Achievements and titles
- Personal best: Marathon: 2:17:08

Alex Taylor (born January 4, 1980) is an American distance runner who specializes in the marathon. He was the second Masters finisher at the 2021 Boston Marathon, and he also competed at the U.S. Olympic Trials marathon in 2020 and 2024.

== Early life ==
Taylor grew up in Woodbridge, Virginia and attended Woodbridge Senior High School. He quit running cross country his sophomore year, and never ran competitively during his college years at Virginia Tech. He returned to the sport during graduate school.

== Career ==
After graduate school, Taylor moved to Lincoln, Massachusetts and was inspired to run competitively after spectating the Boston Marathon. His first marathon was the 2007 Chicago Marathon, which he completed in 3:09.

Taylor improved quickly once he started training with the BAA. He clocked a time of 2:22:19 at the 2011 Boston Marathon, which was only 19 seconds slower than the Olympic Trials qualifying standard at the time.

After a period of injuries, Taylor notched his first sub-2:20 marathon at age 37, recording a time of 2:19:34 at the 2017 California International Marathon. He lowered that time by 23 seconds the following year, but was still 11 seconds off the Olympic Trials qualifying standard.

Taylor's breakthrough race came at the 2019 Grandma's Marathon in Duluth, MN, where he finished in 2:17:08. This result qualified him for the 2020 United States Olympic Trials (marathon).

At the Olympic Trials, Taylor placed 105th of 235 men on a hilly course through downtown Atlanta. He was one of only four Masters runners (age 40+) to compete in the race.

In 2021, he ran 2:22:35 at the Boston Marathon, which was good enough for 30th. At age 41, Taylor was the second Masters finisher behind five-time Olympian Abdi Abdirahman.

Taylor placed 6th at the 2021 USA Masters Cross Country Championship.

In 2023, Taylor returned to the Grandma's Marathon and clocked a time of 2:17:32, which qualified him for the 2024 United States Olympic Trials (marathon).

At the Olympic Trials Marathon in Orlando, Taylor was unable to finish in hot, sunny conditions. 50 of the 200 male competitors dropped out.

== Personal ==
As of 2024, Taylor lives in Lincoln, Massachusetts with his wife and two sons. He works as a software engineer.
