= Molly Grabill =

American distance runner (born 1992)

Personal information
- Born: 31 August 1992 (age 34) Poway, California, U.S.

Sport
- Country: United States
- Events: Marathon, half marathon
- College team: University of Oregon

Achievements and titles
- Personal bests: Marathon: 2:26:46; Half marathon: 1:09:53

Molly Grabill (born 31 August 1992) is an American marathon runner. She was an NCAA All-American at the University of Oregon before shifting to long-distance road races after college. Grabill competed at the U.S. Olympic Trials marathon in 2020 and 2024.

== Early life ==
Grabill grew up in Poway, California and attended Rancho Bernardo High School. She won the California state cross country championship as a junior in 2009. She also qualified for the Footlocker National Championships where she placed ninth as a senior and 12th as a junior. On the track, Grabill won a state title at 3,200 meters in 2010.

== College ==
At the University of Oregon, Grabill placed 30th at the 2015 NCAA Cross Country Championships, earning All-American honors. She was a four-time All-American in track. Her highest finish at the national level was a fourth-place result in the 10,000 meters at the 2015 NCAA Outdoor Track Championships.

Grabill achieved these national class results despite being seriously injured in a car accident in November 2012. She was driving on the highway when a man threw a rock off an overpass. The rock shattered Grabill's windshield, hit her in the head, and knocked her unconscious. She lost control of the vehicle, and it overturned on the side of the highway. Grabill suffered a traumatic brain injury, a broken jaw, and she lost some teeth. Aside from occasional dizzy spells, Grabill was mostly recovered from the brain injury after eight months.

== Professional ==
After college, Grabill quickly moved up to the half marathon distance. She placed second at the 2018 Indianapolis Monumental Half Marathon in a time of 1:13:21, which qualified her for the 2020 United States Olympic Trials (marathon).

In 2019, she finished sixth at Grandma's Marathon with a time of 2:35:11. In the fall, she won the Indianapolis Monumental Half Marathon in 1:12:20. At the 2020 Olympic Trials Marathon in Atlanta, Grabill placed 25th of nearly 400 women in a time of 2:37:57.

Grabill had a strong fall season in 2021, as she finished third at the USA 25K Championships, won her second Indianapolis Monumental Half Marathon, and took second at the California International Marathon.

In 2022, Grabill placed seventh at the USA 10 Mile Championship and 22nd at the New York City Marathon. The following year she recorded a top five finish at the Cherry Blossom Ten Mile Run and she ran 2:29:45 at the 2023 Toronto Waterfront Marathon.

Grabill won the Citizens division of the Bolder Boulder 10K in 2023 and 2024 while training under coach, Nell Rojas.

At the 2024 United States Olympic Trials (marathon) in Orlando, Grabill placed 13th of 137 women in a time of 2:30:16. In December 2024, she logged her fastest marathon in Valencia with a time of 2:26:46.

Grabill was the runner-up at the 2025 Marathon Project event in Arizona with a 2:28:56 time. Racing the Elite Professional division of the Bolder Boulder 10K in 2026, Grabill placed 13th in 35:36.

== Personal ==
As of 2024, Grabill lives in Boulder, Colorado and works as a project manager for Connect for Health Colorado. She also serves as a coach for several distance runners.
