= Louis Serafini =

American distance runner (born 1991)

Personal information
- Born: 20 September 1991 (age 35) Niskayuna, New York, United States

Sport
- Country: United States
- Events: Marathon, Half Marathon
- College team: Boston College
- Team: Tracksmith

Achievements and titles
- Personal bests: Marathon: 2:14:59; Half Marathon: 1:03:49; 10 miles: 47:35

Louis Serafini (born 20 September 1991) is an American distance runner. He competed in the 2016, 2020, and 2024 U.S. Olympic Trials marathon. He has also run under four minutes in the mile.

== Early life ==
Serafini grew up in Niskayuna, New York, and attended Niskayuna High School. He played baseball in his youth but focused on running after breaking five minutes in the mile as a high school freshman. In a 2024 interview, Serafini said he often raced in three events at track meets - the 1,600 meters, 1,000 meters, and 600 meters. He lowered his mile time to 4:13 by his senior year, and chose to attend Boston College. Competing for BC, he achieved a 4:08 mile and 14:39 in the 5,000 meters, but never qualified for an NCAA Championship.

== Career ==
Serafini moved up in distance after college and achieved two notable results in the fall of 2015. He won the Mohawk Hudson River Half Marathon in October, and then three weeks later recorded a 1:04:32 time at the Philadelphia Rock n Roll Half, which qualified him for the 2016 U.S. Olympic Trials Marathon.

At the Olympic Trials in Los Angeles, Serafini was unable to finish in sunny, hot conditions. He bounced back in the spring by placing 10th at the US Half Marathon Championship with a time of 1:04:17.

Serafini returned to the track in 2017, clocking a 13:54 time in the 5,000 meters at Boston University. In 2018, he broke 4 minutes in the indoor mile with a 3:59.33 mark, also at Boston University.

In 2019, Serafini was in top form in road races. He broke the course record at the Brooklyn Half Marathon, one of the largest half marathons in the United States, by clocking a time of 1:03:14. In the fall, he placed 20th at the New York City Marathon in a time of 2:16:34.

At the 2020 United States Olympic Trials (marathon) in Atlanta, Serafini placed 60th out of 235 men in a time of 2:20:27.

Following the COVID-19 pandemic, Serafini returned to track racing in the spring of 2021, notching a personal-best 10,000 meter time of 28:54 in California.

Serafini hit two Olympic Trials qualifying performances in the marathon in 2022, running 2:15:55 at Grandma's Marathon in May and 2:14:59 at the California International Marathon in December.

He won the 2023 Vermont City Marathon with a time of 2:17:55.

At the 2024 United States Olympic Trials (marathon) in Orlando, Serafini placed 35th of 200 men in sunny, hot conditions.

In 2024, Serafini was inducted into the Greater Capital Region Track Field and Cross Country Hall of Fame.

Serafini finished in the top 50 at the 2026 Boston Marathon. His time qualified him for the 2028 U.S. Olympic Trials.

== Personal ==
As of 2024, Serafini lives in Cambridge, Massachusetts with his wife and two dogs. He works as the Director of Community for running brand, Tracksmith.
