= Bijan Mazaheri =

American distance runner (born 1994)

Personal information
- Born: June 28, 1994 (age 32) Madison, Wisconsin, United States

Sport
- Country: United States
- Events: Marathon, half marathon
- College team: Williams College
- Team: Rabbit Elite

Achievements and titles
- Personal bests: 50km: 3:01:01; Marathon: 2:15:26; Half marathon: 1:04:08; 10,000 meters: 29:15

Bijan Mazaheri (born June 28, 1994) is an American distance runner who specializes in marathons and ultra-marathons. He earned multiple All-American honors in cross country and track at Williams College, before shifting to long-distance road and trail running after graduating. He qualified for the U.S. Olympic Trials Marathon in 2020 and 2024, and was the USA 50 km Champion in 2022. He is also a professor at Dartmouth's Thayer School of Engineering, where he works on the mathematics of causality.

== Early life ==
Mazaheri grew up in Wellesley, Massachusetts and attended Wellesley High School. He initially preferred swimming and didn't start running competitively until his junior year of high school. Despite the late start, Mazaheri qualified for the Massachusetts State Track and Field Championships in the 1,000 meters, 1-mile, and 2-mile events. He chose to attend NCAA Division III Williams College and continue his running career.

At Williams, Mazaheri placed as high as third in the NCAA Cross Country Championship (2015), and he was the 2015 NCAA runner-up in the 10,000 meters on the track. Mazaheri also notched multiple All-American awards in the 5,000 meters both indoors and outdoors.

== Career ==
After graduating in 2016, Mazaheri moved to England as a Herchel Smith Fellow at the University of Cambridge. He continued racing in both cross country and track, finishing 7th at the 2017 British University Cross Country Championships.

After beginning his PhD at the California Institute of Technology, he moved up to the half-marathon distance. His time of 1:04:08 at the San Jose Rock n Roll Half was only eight seconds slower than the qualifying standard for the 2020 United States Olympic Trials (marathon).

In 2019, Mazaheri progressed to the marathon and placed in the top 10 at the Ottawa Marathon (2:22:11). In the fall, he lowered that mark to 2:15:26 at the Chicago Marathon. This result qualified him for the 2020 Olympic Trials.

At the Olympic Trials in Atlanta, Mazaheri clocked a time of 2:21:54 to place 73rd of 235 men. His next marathon came in 2021 at the Los Angeles Marathon where he placed fourth in a time of 2:21:43.

2022 was another productive year for Mazaheri, as he recorded a time of 2:17:07 at the Florence Marathon, which qualified him for the 2024 United States Olympic Trials (marathon). He also became a US National Champion at 50K, as he clocked a time of 3:01:01 to run away from the field at Heckscher State Park on Long Island, New York.

In November 2023, Mazaheri placed 20th of 46 men at the IAU World 50K Championship in India. Due to injury, Mazaheri was unable to compete at the 2024 Olympic Trials Marathon in Orlando.

He placed seventh at the 2024 USA Mountain Running Championship at Loon Mountain in New Hampshire.

== Personal ==
As of 2024, Mazaheri is married and living in Lebanon, New Hampshire. He earned his PhD from Caltech and completed a postdoc at The Broad Institute of MIT and Harvard. He is now a professor of engineering at Dartmouth College.
