= Noah Droddy =

American distance runner (born 1990)

Personal information
- Born: September 22, 1990 (age 36) Indianapolis, Indiana, United States

Sport
- Country: United States
- Events: Marathon, half marathon
- College team: Depauw University
- Team: Roots Running

Achievements and titles
- Personal bests: Marathon: 2:09:09; Half Marathon: 1:01:48; 10,000 meters: 28:07

Noah Droddy is an American distance runner who specializes in the marathon. He competed collegiately at Depauw University, earning All-American honors, before focusing on longer distance races after college. Droddy qualified for the U.S. Olympic Trials in 2016, 2020, and 2024.

== Early life ==
Droddy grew up in the Irvington neighborhood of Indianapolis, Indiana and attended the International School of Indiana. He showed little promise as a national-caliber distance runner, clocking a personal-best 5K time of 16:37. Without any scholarship offers, Droddy attended Depauw University and walked on to the cross country and track teams. There he lowered his best times to 14:36 for 5,000 meters and 29:41 for 10,000 meters. Droddy’s best result in college was his eighth-place finish at the 2012 NCAA Division III Cross Country Championship.

== Career ==
=== 2013 - 2017 ===
Droddy initially stopped running competitively after graduating from Depauw in 2013. Instead, he worked as a gardener in Indianapolis. The full days of manual labor left little time for training, so he only ran 40–50 miles per week. He began working at a running store in late 2014, which reinvigorated his training. In November 2015, Droddy moved to Boulder, Colorado to focus more on his running.

His first notable result came in late 2015 at the Indianapolis Monumental Half Marathon, where placed 11th in a time of 1:06:20. Droddy improved at that distance in 2016, logging three results in the 1:04 range. He also recorded a time of 28:22 in the 10,000 meters, which qualified him for the 2016 United States Olympic trials (track and field).

During this time, Droddy didn't have a professional contract, so he worked at a running store and at the front desk of a gym to make ends meet. He estimated he made only $5,000 to $10,000 per year through his running career.

At the 2016 Olympic Trials, Droddy placed last in the 10,000 meters, but received a flurry of attention in the press and on social media for his unusual look - he raced in a backwards hat and sunglasses while sporting a mustache and long hair. Runner’s World referred to him as "the mustached beer drinking hero".

Droddy bounced back from a bad performance at the Trials by placing second at the 2016 USA 10 Mile Championship in a time of 47:28. He continued his upward trajectory in 2017, clocking a time of 1:01:48 at the New York City Half Marathon to place seventh. In the fall, Droddy made his marathon debut at the Chicago Marathon, placing 19th in a time of 2:16:26. This result qualified him for the 2020 United States Olympic Trials (marathon).

=== 2018 - Present ===
In 2018, Droddy placed 21st at the Houston Half Marathon and notched a personal-best 10,000 meter time of 28:07. In 2019, he placed fifth at the New York City Half Marathon and 17th at the Chicago Marathon in a time of 2:11:42. Due to injury, Droddy was unable to compete in the 2020 Olympic Trials Marathon in Atlanta.

He returned to top form in December 2020 when he clocked a time of 2:09:09 at the Marathon Project event in Arizona. This was the 10th-fastest marathon ever recorded by an American at the time, and the fastest marathon ever by an Indiana native.

In 2022, Droddy placed sixth at the USA Half Marathon Championship and fourth at the Brooklyn Half Marathon. Over the summer, he claimed ninth at the Beach to Beacon 10K, his second top-10 finish in the event.

Droddy returned to the marathon in 2023 with a 2:16:56 mark at the California International Marathon, which qualified him for the 2024 United States Olympic Trials (marathon). At the Trials in Orlando, Droddy was unable to finish in hot, sunny conditions.

He planned to compete in the 2024 New York City Marathon, but instead announced his retirement from competitive racing in October.

Droddy is the co-founder and co-host of the D3 Glory Days podcast, which covers notable distance runners who competed at the NCAA Division III level.
