= Savannah Berry (runner) =

American distance runner (born 1996)

Personal information
- Born: 28 January 1996 (age 30) Bakersfield, California, U.S.

Sport
- Country: United States
- Events: Marathon, half marathon
- College team: Utah Valley University
- Team: Asics

Achievements and titles
- Personal bests: Marathon: 2:29:13; Half marathon: 1:12:52

Savannah Berry (born 28 January 1996) is an American marathon runner. She competed in the U.S. Olympic Trials in 2020 and 2024. Berry placed third overall and was the top American finisher at the 2025 Los Angeles Marathon.

== Early life ==
Berry grew up in Bakersfield, California and attended Highland High School, where she was a standout cross-country runner while also playing soccer. Berry continued her running career at Utah Valley University. She achieved personal best times of 16:46 for 5,000 meters and 34:42 for 10,000 meters, but she never qualified for an NCAA Championship.

== Career ==
Berry moved up to marathon distance shortly after college. She ran a time of 2:44:13 at the 2019 California International Marathon, which qualified her for the 2020 United States Olympic Trials (marathon). At the Olympic Trials, Berry placed 233rd of nearly 400 women in a time of 2:50:36.

In 2022, Berry ran 2:38:03 at Grandma's Marathon for 21st place. In the fall she dropped that time to 2:33:42 at the California International Marathon, which qualified her for the 2024 United States Olympic Trials (marathon).

Berry placed in the top 30 at the 2023 Boston Marathon. Her best marathon time came later in 2023 when she ran a 2:29:13 at the McKirdy Micro Marathon in Valley Cottage, New York.

At the 2024 Olympic Trials in Orlando, Berry placed 12th of 137 women in a time of 2:29:17. After that performance she signed a professional contract with Asics.

Later in 2024 she finished third at the USA 20K Championship and 16th at the New York City Marathon.

In 2025, Berry took third at the Los Angeles Marathon and was the top American finisher. She placed in the top 10 in both the USA 25K and 20K Championships.

In 2026, Berry placed eighth in the Los Angeles Marathon in a time of 2:34:27, which qualified her for the 2028 United States Olympics Trials (marathon). In the fall she placed 28th at the Berlin Marathon with a time of 2:31:31.

== Personal ==
As of 2024, Berry lives in Orem, Utah and works as the Director of Operations at an elementary school.
