= Erika Kemp =

American distance runner (born 1995)

Personal information
- Born: January 26, 1995 (age 31) Mount Holly, New Jersey, U.S.

Sport
- Country: United States
- Events: Marathon, half marathon
- College team: North Carolina State University
- Team: Brooks

Achievements and titles
- Personal bests: Marathon: 2:22:56; Half marathon: 1:08:42

Erika Kemp (born January 26, 1995) is an American professional distance runner. She was an NCAA All-American at North Carolina State University before continuing as a professional for Brooks. Kemp is a two-time USA Champion, and she competed in the U.S. Olympic Trials in 2021 and 2024.

== Early life ==
Kemp grew up in Mount Holly, New Jersey, and attended Rancocas Valley Regional High School. There she won numerous county and sectional championships in track. Her highest finish at the state level was fourth in the 3200 meters. For college, she attended North Carolina State University where she earned five All-American awards in track and one in cross-country. She graduated in 2018 with career best times of 15:41 for 5,000 meters and 33:13 for 10,000 meters.

== Career ==
As a professional, Kemp won the 2019 USA 15K Championship on the roads in a time of 50:54. At the end of 2020, Kemp ran 31:35 in the 10,000 meters on the track to qualify for the 2020 United States Olympic Trials. In the spring of 2021, Kemp ran 15:10 in the 5,000 meters to qualify for the trials in a second event.

At the 2021 Olympic Trials, Kemp placed 15th in the final of the 5,000 meters, and she did not finish the 10,000 meters. In September 2021, Kemp won the USA 20K Championship with a time of 1:06:20. At the end of the year, she finished sixth in the USA Half Marathon Championship.

In 2022, Kemp won the Boston 10K for Women and placed seventh at the BAA Half Marathon. She began 2023 by placing seventh at the Houston Half Marathon (1:10:14).

At the 2023 Boston Marathon, Kemp finished 27th in a time of 2:33:57. This was the fastest marathon time ever recorded for an American-born black woman. Kemp lowered this record to 2:22:56 at the 2025 Houston Marathon, which at the time was the 12th fastest by an American woman. She was paced in Houston by Jonas Hampton.

Kemp competed in the 2024 United States Olympic Trials (marathon) in Orlando, but was unable to finish. In the summer of 2024, Kemp placed eighth at the U.S. Olympic Trials (track and field) in the 10,000 meters with a time of 32:21.

In 2025, following her 2:22 marathon in Houston, Kemp represented the United States at the 2025 World Athletics Championships in the marathon, placing 52nd of 73 women.

In 2026, Kemp placed 11th at the Houston Half Marathon and seventh at the USA Half Marathon Championship.

== Personal life ==
Kemp lives in Providence, Rhode Island. Her boyfriend is in the military and lives in Germany. Her father served in the U.S. Air Force.
