= Kevin Lewis (runner) =

American distance runner (born 1993)

Personal information
- Born: 10 July 1993 (age 32) Ottumwa, Iowa, U.S.

Sport
- Country: United States
- Events: Marathon, half marathon, 10,000 meters
- College team: University of Iowa
- Team: Minnesota Distance Elite

Achievements and titles
- Personal bests: Marathon: 2:12:02; Half marathon: 1:02:48; 10,000 meters: 28:32

Kevin Lewis is an American distance runner. He ran track and cross country at the University of Iowa before joining Minnesota Distance Elite to continue his career. Lewis competed at the U.S. Olympic Trials marathon in 2020 and 2024.

== Early life ==
Lewis grew up in Ottumwa, Iowa and attended Ottumwa High School. There he won Iowa state titles in cross country, the 1,600 meters, and 3,200 meters. His best time of 9:05.58 in the 3,200 meters broke the state record which had stood for 38 years. He was named the Iowa Gatorade Player of the Year for Track and Field in 2011. Lewis also excelled academically as he was named the valedictorian of his graduating class.

Lewis continued his running career at the University of Iowa. He earned All-Big 10 honors in cross country and was a second team All-American in the 5,000 meters indoors. Lewis's best time of 13:43.70 in the 5,000 meters broke the Iowa Hawkeyes record for the event. At Iowa, Lewis earned an engineering degree and was roommates with mid-distance runner Eric Sowinski.

== Career ==
After graduating in 2015, Lewis initially ran between 50 and 80 miles per week while working in software development. He joined the Minnesota Distance Elite team in 2016 and increased his weekly mileage to 90–100, which led to national-class results. Lewis ran 28:56 for 10,000 meters in June 2017, which qualified him for the USA Championships where he placed 20th.

In 2018, Lewis dropped his 10,000 meter time to 28:32 and finished 13th at the USA Championship. Shortly thereafter he won the Ames Midnight Madness 10k on the roads in a time of 30:33.

Lewis moved up in distance in 2019, clocking a 1:03:55 half marathon in Houston, which qualified him for the 2020 United States Olympic Trials (marathon). On the track, Lewis again made it to the USA Championship for 10,000 meters and placed 19th. In the fall he finished fifth at the Indianapolis Monumental Half Marathon.

In his debut marathon at the 2020 Olympic Trials in Atlanta, Lewis took 39th of 235 men in a time of 2:17:36. At the end of 2020, Lewis recorded his best marathon time of 2:12:02 at the Marathon Project event in Arizona.

In 2021, Lewis placed 21st at the New York City Marathon in a time of 2:22:39. The following spring he placed in the top 10 at Grandma's Marathon in Duluth, Minnesota with a time of 2:13:48. This result qualified Lewis for the 2024 United States Olympic trials (marathon). He also recorded a sixth place finish at the 2022 Los Angeles Marathon, ahead of notable competitors such as Fernando Cabada and Chad Beyer.

Lewis placed in the top 25 at the 2024 Houston Half Marathon with a time of 1:03:48. At the 2024 Olympic Trials Marathon in Orlando, Lewis finished 144th of 200 men in a time of 2:36:34.

Lewis qualified for his third U.S. Olympic Trials by running 2:15:06 at the 2025 California International Marathon.

== Personal ==
As of 2024, Lewis lives in Richfield, Minnesota and works in software development.
