= Tristin Colley =

American distance runner (born 1996)

Personal information
- Born: 3 October 1994 (age 32)

Sport
- Country: United States
- Events: Marathon, half marathon
- College team: Appalachian State University

Achievements and titles
- Personal bests: Marathon: 2:25:58; Half marathon: 1:11:21

Tristin Colley (née Van Ord) (born October 3, 1994) is an American distance runner. She competed collegiately for Appalachian State University before running professionally for ZAP Endurance. Colley competed at the U.S. Olympic Trials in 2020 and 2024.

== High school and college ==
Colley grew up in Chapel Hill, North Carolina and attended Chapel Hill High School. There she was a four-time All-State cross country runner and a two-time state runner-up in the 3200 meters. Colley continued running at Appalachian State University, where she won nine Sun Belt Conference titles on the track.

== Career ==
Colley debuted in the marathon at the 2019 Grandma's Marathon in Duluth, Minnesota. She ran 2:40:04 to place 14th and qualify for the 2020 United States Olympic Trials (marathon).

At the 2020 Olympic Trials in Atlanta, Colley placed 52nd of over 400 women in a time of 2:41:14. Following the COVID-19 pandemic, Colley improved her marathon best to 2:32:56 at the 2021 Grandma's Marathon, where she finished third. In the fall of 2021, she placed 17th at the Chicago Marathon.

Colley finished 11th at both the USA Half Marathon Championship and the USA 20K Championship in 2021.

In the spring of 2022, Colley placed in the top five at the Rotterdam Marathon with a time of 2:29:32. In the fall, she placed in the top 10 at the USA 10-Mile and USA 20K Championships.

In 2023, Colley took fourth at the Houston Marathon and the USA 20K Championships. Her fastest marathon came at the 2023 Chicago Marathon where she ran 2:25:58 for 14th place.

Colley won the 2023 Freihofer's Run for Women 5K, a national-class road race in Albany, New York. She also placed in the top five at the USA 6K Championship in Ohio.

At the 2024 United States Olympic Trials (marathon) in Orlando, Colley placed 17th of 137 women in a time of 2:30:46. In the fall of 2024, Colley finished 13th at the New York City Marathon.

Colley took 19th at the 2025 Boston Marathon in a time of 2:26:39.

In November 2026, Colley won the Philadelphia Half Marathon in a time of 1:13:59, ahead of USA Olympian Dakotah Popehn.

== Personal ==
As of 2024, Colley lives in Blowing Rock, North Carolina with her husband, Andrew Colley, who is also an elite marathoner. She is an assistant track and field coach for Appalachian State University. In 2026 the USATF Foundation awarded Colley a Maternity Grant to help her continue training during and after her pregnancy.
