= Brendan Martin =

American distance runner (born 1989)

Personal information
- Born: 21 March 1989 (age 37) Smithtown, New York, United States

Sport
- Country: United States
- Events: Marathon, half marathon
- College team: Columbia University
- Team: Empire Elite TC

Achievements and titles
- Personal bests: Marathon: 2:14:36; Half Marathon: 1:04:34; 10,000 meters: 29:40

Brendan Martin is an American distance runner who specializes in the marathon. He ran collegiately for Columbia University before becoming a marathoner. Martin competed U.S. Olympic Trials Marathon in 2016, 2020, and 2024.

== Early life ==
Martin grew up in Smithtown, New York and attended Smithtown West High School. He played lacrosse until his sophomore year of high school, and then decided to focus on running. He led his cross country team to three consecutive Suffolk County Championships. After graduating in 2007, Martin attended Columbia University where he ran cross country and track, registering a career-best time of 14:09 for 5,000 meters.

== Career ==
=== 2012 to 2016 ===
After college, Martin quickly made a jump to the marathon distance, placing 13th overall at the 2012 Boston Marathon. He followed that up with a 2:18:28 performance at the 2013 Fukuoka Marathon in Japan.

In 2014, he lowered his marathon best to 2:16:28 at the California International Marathon, which qualified him for the 2016 Olympic Trials Marathon.

The following year he placed 4th of 26,436 runners at the 2015 Brooklyn Half Marathon, one of the largest half marathons in the United States. He also improved his marathon time to 2:15:30 at the 2015 Grandma's Marathon in June.

At the 2016 Olympic Trials Marathon in Los Angeles, Martin endured sunny, hot conditions to place 20th in a time of 2:20:41. In the fall, he took 14th place at the New York City Marathon in a time of 2:19:34.

=== 2017 to Present ===
Martin placed 15th at the 2017 New York City Marathon. His next major came in the fall of 2018, when he clocked a 2:16:26 time at the Berlin Marathon, which qualified him for the 2020 United States Olympic Trials (marathon) in Atlanta.

USATF New York named Martin the Long Distance Runner of the Year in 2016 and 2018. Olympic medalist Meb Keflezighi won the award in 2014, 2015, and 2017.

At the 2020 Olympic Trials, Martin finished in 135th place out of 235 men on a hilly course. Later that year, he notched his second-best marathon time of 2:15:34 at the Marathon Project event in Arizona.

His best half marathon came the next year at the 2021 Project 13.1 event in New York, where Martin clocked a time of 1:04:34 to place 9th.

In 2022, Martin returned to the Berlin Marathon and placed 34th in a time of 2:16:02, which qualified him for the 2024 United States Olympic Trials (marathon) in Orlando.

At the 2024 Olympic Trials in February, Martin placed 127th of 200 men in sunny, hot conditions. In December, he recorded his third sub 2:16 marathon, with a 2:15:59 performance at the 2024 Valencia Marathon.

Martin is one of only 13 American men who have finished the last three U.S. Olympic Trials marathons (2016, 2020, 2024).

Martin qualified for his fourth U.S. Olympic Trials by running 2:14:36 at the 2026 Berlin Marathon.

== Personal ==
As of 2024, Martin lives in Brooklyn, New York with his wife. He operates a physical therapy clinic where he specializes in endurance athletes and gait mechanics.
