= Turner Wiley =

American distance runner (born 1993)

Personal information
- Born: April 17, 1993 (age 33) Issaquah, Washington, U.S.

Sport
- Country: United States
- Events: Marathon, half marathon
- College team: Seattle Pacific University
- Team: Brooks

Achievements and titles
- Personal bests: Marathon: 2:09:27; Half Marathon: 1:02:43

Turner Wiley (born 17 April 1993) is an American marathon runner. He represented the United States at the 2023 Pan American Games, and he competed in the U.S. Olympic Trials in 2020 and 2024.

== Early life ==
Wiley grew up in Issaquah, Washington and attended Issaquah High School, where he ran cross country and track. Wiley competed in the Washington state cross country meet three times, and his fastest 3200-meter time on the track was 9:36. He enrolled at Division II Seattle Pacific University, where he broke the school record for 10,000 meters (30:53) and 5,000 meters (14:56). Wiley never qualified for an NCAA Championship.

== Career ==
After graduating in 2014, Wiley continued competing in track for several years without achieving any national-class results. In 2019, he debuted in the marathon in Paris with a time of 2:30:31. Later in the year, he improved by 13 minutes to 2:17:00 at the Chicago Marathon. This result qualified him for the 2020 United States Olympic Trials (marathon).

At the 2020 Olympic Trials in Atlanta, Wiley ran 2:24:54 to place 99th of 235 men. In 2021, Wiley finished 14th at the Chicago Marathon in a time of 2:16:51. He ran faster in the 2022 Chicago Marathon, placing 19th at 2:11:59. This qualified him for the 2024 United States Olympic Trials (marathon) and the 2023 Pan American Games.

In the spring of 2023, Wiley took 18th at the Boston Marathon. In the fall, he placed ninth of 14 competitors at the Pan American Games in Chile.

At the 2024 Olympic Trials in Orlando, Wiley finished 29th of 200 men in a time of 2:16:42. A few months later he placed third at the Vancouver Sun Run 10K.

In summer 2025, Wiley placed 12th in the 10,000 meters at the USA Track & Field Championships. In December, he finished second at the Marathon Project event in Arizona with a personal best time of 2:09:27.

Wiley finished in the top 30 at the 2026 Boston Marathon

Wiley finished 25th at the 2026 New York City Marathon in a time of 2:12:24. He was the 11th American finisher.

Wiley has a professional contract with Brooks. He has previously competed for Club Northwest based in Seattle. He runs up to 140 miles per week in preparation for marathons.

== Personal ==
As of 2026, Wiley lives in the Seattle area with his wife, infant son, and dog. He works full-time in healthcare administration for Seattle Children's Hospital.
