= Riley Masters =

American distance runner (born 1990)

Personal information
- Born: 5 April 1990 (age 36) Bangor, Maine, United States

Sport
- Country: United States
- Events: 1,500 meters, Mile, 5,000 meters
- College team: University of Maine, University of Oklahoma

Achievements and titles
- Personal bests: 1,500 meters: 3:36.49; Mile: 3:56.15; 5,000 meters: 13:16.97

Riley Masters is a retired American mid-distance runner who specialized in the mile and 1,500 meters events. After a decorated career at Bangor High School in Bangor, Maine, Masters competed at the NCAA level for the University of Maine and then the University of Oklahoma, where he earned multiple All-American honors. He competed in the 2012 and 2016 U.S. Olympic Trials.

== Career ==
=== Maine ===
Masters was raised in the small town of Veazie, Maine and attended Bangor High School, where he won state championships at the mile, 1600 meters, and 3200 meters. After graduating in 2008, he enrolled at the University of Maine, where he was a two-time NCAA All-American in the mile. He ran a sub-4 mile for the first time in 2010, clocking 3:58.17 at an indoor meet at Boston University.

=== Oklahoma ===
In 2011, Masters transferred to the University of Oklahoma. He won the 2012 Big 12 Conference title in the 1,500 meters in a time of 3:43.48. Indoors, he was a member of Oklahoma's All-American distance medley relay team.

Masters competed at the 2012 United States Olympic Trials (track and field). He clocked a time of 3:42.71 in the 1,500 meters prelim, but did not advance to the semifinal.

He returned to Oklahoma for his senior year and lowered his mile best to 3:56.25 at the 2013 Tyson Invitational. Outdoors, he qualified for the NCAA Championship in the 1,500 meters and placed 11th.

== Professional ==
After graduating from Oklahoma in 2013, Masters signed with Brooks and embarked on a professional career. He competed in European track meets in the summer of 2013, before returning to his home state of Maine, where he won the Maine Men's division of the 2013 Beach to Beacon 10K.

In 2015, Masters notched a top-5 finish at the USA Indoor Championships in Boston, clocking a 4:03.82 mile.

Moving up in distance to the 5,000 meters, Masters competed in the 2016 United States Olympic Trials (track and field). He advanced out of the prelim heats by recording a time of 13:49.75, before placing 16th in the final.

Masters signed a contract with Nike in 2017. He became a US Champion in 2018 when he won the USATF 1-Mile Road Championship in Des Moines, Iowa. Two months later in Des Moines, Masters placed 4th in the USA Outdoor Track Championship in the 5,000 meters.

When the 2020 United States Olympic Trials (track and field) were delayed to 2021 due to the COVID-19 pandemic, Masters opted to retire and have surgery rather than continue his running career.

Masters is one of only four men from Maine who have competed in at least two U.S. Olympic Trials and won the Maine title at the Beach to Beacon 10K, along with Ben True, Louis Luchini, and Matt Rand.

In 2021, Masters was inducted into the University of Maine Sports Hall of Fame.

== Personal ==
Masters lives in Boulder, Colorado with his wife and works in sales. He is also a volunteer assistant coach for the University of Colorado track and field team.
