= Myler =

Myler is a surname. Notable people with the surname include:

- Andrew Myler (born 1975), Irish footballer
- Cammy Myler (born 1968), American luger
- Colin Myler, British journalist
- Frank Myler (1938–2020), English rugby league footballer
- Makenna Myler, American track and field athlete
- Mel Myler, American politician
- Richie Myler (born 1990), English rugby league footballer
- Stephen Myler (born 1984), English rugby footballer
- Tadeusz Myler (1949–2022), Polish entrepreneur and politician
- Tony Myler (born 1960), English rugby league footballer and coach

== See also ==
- Mylar, type of plastic
- Myler House, historic house in Arkansas
