= Tom Slattery =

American distance runner

Personal information
- Born: March 15, 1996 (age 30) Garden City, New York, United States

Sport
- Country: United States
- Event(s): Marathon, half marathon
- College team: Fordham University
- Team: GRC Tracksmith

Achievements and titles
- Personal best(s): Marathon: 2:15:34; Half Marathon: 1:07:34; 10 miles: 50:43

Tom Slattery (born 15 March 1996) is an American distance runner who specializes in the marathon. He competed in the 2020 and 2024 United States Olympic Trials. Slattery is also a Lieutenant Junior Grade in the United States Coast Guard.

== Early life ==
Slattery grew up in Garden City, New York and attended Chaminade High School. He was part of the National Champion 4x800 meter relay team and was also a three-year team captain. In cross country, Slattery was First-Team All-Long Island two times. He continued running at Fordham University, where achieved personal-best times of 14:00 for 5,000 meters and 30:55 for 10,000 meters. Slattery also won the Atlantic 10 conference championship in the 3,000 meters.

== Career ==
After graduating in 2018, Slattery initially pursued a career in the finance sector, while continuing to train competitively. He finished 29th at the 2019 New York City Half Marathon, one of the largest half marathons in the United States.

In the fall of 2019, Slattery competed in his first marathon, clocking a time of 2:19:10 at the California International Marathon (CIM). With this mark, Slattery was only 10 seconds slower than the qualifying standard for the 2020 United States Olympic Trials (marathon).

He came back less than two months later and logged a 2:18:35 at the Houston Marathon, which qualified him for the Trials. On February 29, 2020, Slattery placed 152nd of 235 men at the Olympic Trials in Atlanta.

While working from home during the COVID-19 pandemic, Slattery realized that he missed being part of a team and became determined to make a career change. He decided to join the Coast Guard, and was sworn in as a reserve officer in June 2021. In the fall of 2021 while training for the New York City Marathon, Slattery was sent by the Coast Guard to New Orleans to aid in the relief effort following Hurricane Ida. He was working 14-hour days and could no longer train effectively, and he ultimately withdrew from the NYC Marathon.

Slattery returned to marathoning in 2022, running a new personal-best 2:15:34 at CIM, which qualified him for the 2024 United States Olympic Trials (marathon). In the fall of 2023, Slattery placed 20th at the New York City Marathon in a time of 2:20:45.

Eight weeks prior to the Trials, Slattery’s wife gave birth to their daughter, which impacted his training for the race. He was still able to finish 125th of 200 men on a hot, sunny day in Orlando.

In March 2025, Slattery was named the U.S. Coast Guard Elite Athlete of the Year for 2024.

== Personal ==
As of 2024, Slattery lives in Alexandria, Virginia with his wife and daughter. He works in the National Command Center for the United States Coast Guard.
