= Colin Mickow =

American distance runner (born 1990)

Personal information
- Born: March 15, 1990 (age 36) Princeton, Illinois, U.S.

Sport
- Country: United States
- Events: Marathon, half marathon
- College team: University of Illinois
- Team: Second City Track Club

Achievements and titles
- Personal bests: Marathon: 2:11:22; Half Marathon: 1:01:41

Colin Mickow (born 15 March 1990) is an American marathon runner. He competed in the U.S. Olympic Trials in 2020 and 2024, and he represented the United States at the 2022 World Athletics Championships.

== Early life ==
Mickow grew up in Princeton, Illinois and attended Princeton High School. He was an All-State runner in cross country and track, and he finished as high as fourth in the Illinois State 2A Cross Country Championships. Mickow continued his running career at the University of Illinois. He recorded personal-best times of 29:10 for 10,000 meters and 14:08 for 5,000 meters, but he never qualified for an NCAA Championship.

== Career ==
After graduating from college in 2012, Mickow took six years off from competitive running. Instead, he worked as an accountant and then a financial analyst. During this time, he focused more on lifting weights rather than running. In 2018, he decided to run the Naperville Half Marathon because it started less than a mile from his home. He won that race and began training more seriously for marathons. Mickow now logs 140 to 150 miles per week, often waking up at 4:30am to run 12 miles before work.

In 2019, he ran 2:14:55 at the Chicago Marathon, his debut at the distance. This result qualified him for the 2020 United States Olympic Trials (marathon). In January 2020, Mickow placed 20th at the Houston Half Marathon in a time of 1:01:47.

At the 2020 Olympic Trials in Atlanta, Mickow ran 2:13:45 to place 15th of 235 men in only his second attempt at the marathon distance. In December 2020, he lowered his marathon best to 2:11:22 at the Marathon Project event in Arizona.

The following year, Mickow logged his highest finish at a World Marathon Major, placing sixth overall at the 2021 Chicago Marathon. He was the second American finisher behind Galen Rupp. This performance ultimately qualified Mickow to represent the United States at the 2022 World Athletics Championships Marathon.

At the World Championship in Eugene, Oregon, Mickow tripped and fell at a bottle station near 10K, which resulted in a torn meniscus, strained hamstring, and extreme cramping. He still was able to finish the race in 46th place of 63 men, but his knee required surgery later in the year.

In 2023, Mickow placed 21st at the Boston Marathon in 2:14:27. At the 2024 United States Olympic Trials (marathon) in Orlando, he finished 20th of 200 men in a time of 2:14:59.

In 2025, Mickow placed in the top 25 at the Boston Marathon and Chicago Marathon.

== Personal ==
Mickow lives in Oswego, Illinois with his wife and son. He is a financial analyst at KeHE. His identical twin brother, Hunter Mickow, was an All-American runner at the University of Illinois.
