= Matt McDonald (runner) =

American distance runner (born 1993)

Personal information
- Born: May 10, 1993 (age 33) Annandale, New Jersey, United States

Sport
- Country: United States
- Events: Marathon, half marathon
- College team: Princeton University
- Team: BAA

Achievements and titles
- Personal bests: Marathon: 2:09:49; Half Marathon: 1:03:43; 10,000 meters: 29:38

Matt McDonald (born May 10, 1993) is an American distance runner who specializes in the marathon. He has placed in the top 25 in seven World Marathon Majors, and finished 10th in the 2020 U.S. Olympic Trials marathon. He also competed in the 2024 U.S. Olympic Trials marathon.

== Early life ==
McDonald grew up in the Annandale section of Clinton Township, New Jersey and attended North Hunterdon High School, graduating in 2011. He was the New Jersey state champion at 3200 meters indoors, and also qualified for Footlocker Nationals in cross country. McDonald stayed close to home and attended Princeton University. There he competed in two NCAA Cross Country Championships for the Tigers, and he qualified for the NCAA Regionals as a senior in the 10,000 meters.

== Career ==
=== 2017–2020 ===
Two years after graduating from Princeton, McDonald registered notable results in long-distance road races. He placed 5th in the 2017 Indianapolis Half Marathon with a time of 1:05:10, and then made his marathon debut one month later at the California International Marathon (CIM). His time of 2:18:34 qualified him for the 2020 United States Olympic Trials (marathon).

In 2018, McDonald returned to CIM and dropped his time substantially to 2:14:06, which was good enough for 11th in a national-class field. His improvement continued in 2019, as he placed 21st at the Boston Marathon and 14th in the Chicago Marathon. His time of 2:11:10 in Chicago elevated McDonald to the top tier of American marathoning.

In the months leading up to the 2020 Olympic Trials, McDonald logged up to 135 miles per week while also completing research and lab work for his PhD in chemical engineering. His coursework was at Georgia Tech, so McDonald had ample opportunity to familiarize himself with the Trials course in Atlanta. Despite his demanding academic schedule, McDonald set a goal of finishing in the top 10 or better at the Olympic Trials.

In February 2020, McDonald achieved his goal of a top-10 finish by placing 10th of 235 men at the Olympic Trials Marathon in his home city. Following the completion of his PhD program, McDonald relocated to Boston and joined the high performance team at BAA.

=== 2021–present ===
In his new hometown, McDonald took 20th at the 2021 Boston Marathon in a time of 2:15:47. He came back in 2022 and did even better, placing 14th in 2:10:35. In the fall of 2022, McDonald notched his career-best marathon time in Chicago with a 2:09:49, good enough for 12th place.

2023 was another successful year for McDonald. He won the New Bedford Half Marathon in March, while his wife, Maegan Krifchin, won the women's race. He followed that with a 10th-place finish at the Boston Marathon and a 13th-place performance at the Chicago Marathon.

At the 2024 United States Olympic Trials (marathon) in Orlando, McDonald was unable to replicate his success from 2020, as he placed 63rd of 200 men in sunny, hot conditions. His wife, Maegan Krifchin, competed in the race despite being seven months pregnant.

== Personal ==
As of 2025, McDonald lives with his wife and child in Philadelphia. He works as an assistant professor of chemical and biological engineering at Drexel University. His research on autonomous synthetic chemistry has been published in Science Magazine.
