= Jacob Thomson =

American distance runner (born 1994)

Personal information
- Born: November 29, 1994 (age 31) Louisville, Kentucky, U.S.

Sport
- Country: United States
- Events: Marathon, half marathon
- College team: North Carolina State University, University of Kentucky
- Team: Under Armour Dark Sky Distance

Achievements and titles
- Personal bests: Marathon: 2:10:56; Half Marathon: 1:02:26

Jacob Thomson (born 29 November 1994) is an American professional distance runner. He was an NCAA All-American at the University of Kentucky. Thomson won the 2023 USA Half Marathon Championship. He also competed at the U.S. Olympic Trials in 2020 and 2024.

== Early life ==
Thomson grew up in Louisville, Kentucky and attended Holy Cross High School in Covington, Kentucky. There he won 12 state titles, was a two-time Kentucky Gatorade Cross Country Runner of the Year, and he finished fifth at the 2013 Footlocker National Cross Country Championships. On the track, Thomson was the runner-up at New Balance Outdoor Nationals in the 5,000 meters. He committed to run at NC State over an offer from the University of Oregon.

After two years at NC State, he transferred to the University of Kentucky. There he earned three NCAA All-American awards, two in the outdoor 10,000 meters and one for the indoor 5,000 meters.

== Career ==
After graduating in 2018, Thomson moved to Boston and trained with the BAA. He competed at the 2019 USA Track & Field Championships, placing 11th in the 5000 meters and 14th in the 10,000 meters.

In 2021, Thomson raced the 10,000 meters at the postponed 2020 United States Olympic Trials (track and field). He placed 17th in a time of 28:42. Later that year he moved to Flagstaff, Arizona and transitioned to road racing.

In the fall of 2021, Thomson finished eighth at the USA 20K Championship, 12th at the Chicago Marathon, and ninth at the USA 25K Championship.

The following year he placed third at the 2022 USA Half Marathon Championship and eighth at the USA 10K Championship. At the end of 2022, Thomson debuted in the marathon with a time of 2:11:52 at the California International Marathon, finishing second to Futsum Zienasellassie.

In February 2023, Thomson won the USA Half Marathon Championship in Fort Worth, Texas. Later in the year he took fifth place in the USA 15K Championship and second in the USA 25K Championship.

Thomson represented the United States at the 2023 World Half Marathon Championship in Riga, Latvia. He finished 36th of 97 competitors.

At the 2024 United States Olympic Trials (marathon) in Orlando, Thomson was unable to finish. He placed sixth at the 2025 USA Marathon Championship in California, which qualified him for the 2028 U.S. Olympic Trials.

Thomson finished in the top 30 at the 2026 Boston Marathon in a personal-best time of 2:09:51.

== Personal ==
Thomson lives and trains in Flagstaff, Arizona and competes for Under Armour Dark Sky Distance. In the summers he returns to Kentucky and operates Bluegrass Running Camp, a training camp for high school distance runners.
