= Brendan Gregg (runner) =

American distance runner (born 1989)

Personal information
- Born: May 15, 1989 (age 37)

Sport
- Country: United States
- Events: Marathon, half marathon, 10,000 meters, 5000 meters
- College team: Stanford University
- Team: Hansons-Brooks

Achievements and titles
- Personal bests: Marathon: 2:11:21; Half Marathon: 1:02:55; 10,000 meters: 28:03; 5,000 meters: 13:43

Brendan Gregg is an American distance runner. He competed at Stanford University before running professionally. Gregg competed in the U.S. Olympic Trials in 2016, 2020, and 2024, and he won the 2021 California International Marathon.

== High school and college ==
Gregg grew up in Davis, California and attended Davis High School, where his father was the cross country and track coach. Gregg won the Stanford Invitational cross country meet in 2006, and he was also a medalist at the California state championships in track and cross country.

He attended Stanford University for college, where he competed in NCAA Championships for the Cardinal in cross country, indoor, and outdoor track. Gregg ran best times of 13:46 for 5,000 meters and 28:54 for 10,000 meters. He placed in the top 10 at the 2011 Pac-12 XC Championship. His best finish at a national meet was his 13th place result in the 5,000 meters at the 2012 NCAA Outdoor Championships.

== Career ==
In 2014, Gregg represented the United States at the Great Edinburgh International Cross Country event in Scotland. He placed 13th in the 8K distance. Gregg placed seventh at the 2014 USA Track Championships in the 10,000 meters. In the fall of 2014, he ran his first marathon in 2:18:30, placing 28th at the Chicago Marathon.

Gregg continued racing track through 2016. He placed eighth in the final for 10,000 meters at the 2016 United States Olympic Trials (track and field). Gregg also competed at the 2016 US Olympic Trials in the marathon alongside his sister, Kaitlin Gregg Goodman. They were the first brother-sister duo to compete at the same US Olympic Trials marathon since 1984.

Gregg did not finish several marathons in 2016 and 2017 but began having more success starting in 2018. He finished fifth at the 2018 California International Marathon in a time of 2:13:27, which qualified him for the 2020 United States Olympic Trials (marathon). He also placed in the top 10 at the 2018 USA 20K Championships.

In 2019, Gregg placed in the top 20 at both the Boston Marathon and Chicago Marathon. At the 2020 Olympic Trials Marathon in Atlanta, Gregg finished 14th of 235 men with a time of 2:13:27.

In December 2021, Gregg won the California International Marathon in a time of 2:11:21, defeating runner-up Rory Linkletter by over one minute.

In 2023, Gregg took ninth at the USA 25K Championships in Michigan. Gregg competed in the 2024 United States Olympic Trials (marathon) in Orlando but was unable to finish.

As of 2026, Gregg is the Course Director for the California International Marathon.
