= Brian Harvey (American runner) =

American distance runner (born 1987)

Personal information
- Born: June 8, 1987 (age 39) Ellicott City, Maryland, United States

Sport
- Country: United States
- Event(s): Marathon, half marathon
- College team: Carnegie Mellon University
- Team: BAA

Achievements and titles
- Personal best(s): Marathon: 2:17:05; Half Marathon: 1:04:44; 10,000 meters: 29:39

Brian Harvey is an American distance runner who specializes in the marathon. He was an NCAA All-American at Carnegie Mellon University, before achieving national-class results in the marathon post-collegiately. Harvey competed in the 2016, 2020, and 2024 U.S. Olympic Trials Marathon.

== Early life ==
Harvey grew up in Ellicott City, Maryland. He began focusing on running after being cut from the soccer team at Centennial High School. After graduating in 2005, Harvey enrolled at Carnegie Mellon University, where he earned five All-American honors in cross country and track, while also leading his team to the NCAA Cross Country Championships.

== Career ==
Upon graduating from college in 2009, Harvey moved to Boston and joined BAA. He notched his personal best 10,000 meters at the 2011 Penn Relays, clocking 29:39.78.

In the 2012 U.S. Indoor Championships, Harvey placed 8th in the 3,000 meters.

Moving up in distance to the marathon, Harvey had a breakthrough in 2014 when he ran 2:17:05 at the Twin Cities Marathon. This result qualified him for the 2016 U.S. Olympic Trials Marathon in Los Angeles.

Harvey has competed in several editions of the Beach to Beacon 10K in Cape Elizabeth, Maine, placing as high as 10th in 2014 with a time of 29:51.

In 2015, Harvey placed 22nd at the USA 15 km Championship in Jacksonville, Florida. Later that year, he placed 17th at Grandma's Marathon with a time of 2:17:17.

At the 2016 Olympic Trials Marathon in sunny, hot conditions, Harvey placed 31st in a time of 2:23:18. In the fall, Harvey won the 2016 Hartford Marathon. He won it again in 2018.

In 2017, Harvey placed 20th in the Boston Marathon with a time of 2:20:18. At the 2018 California International Marathon, Harvey qualified for the 2020 United States Olympic Trials (marathon) with a time of 2:17:49. At the Olympic Trials in Atlanta, Harvey placed 116th out of 235 men.

Following the COVID-19 pandemic, Harvey returned to marathoning at the 2021 Boston Marathon where he placed 29th. At the 2022 Grandma's Marathon, Harvey qualified for his third Olympic Trials with another 2:17 performance.

Harvey was inducted into the Carnegie Mellon Sports Hall of Fame in 2022.

At the 2024 United States Olympic Trials (marathon) in Orlando, Harvey clocked a time of 2:23:47 to place 101st of 200 men.

Harvey is one of 13 American men who finished the three U.S. Olympic Trials marathons from 2016-2024.

== Personal ==
As of 2024, Harvey lives in Belmont, Massachusetts with his wife and daughter, and works as a biomedical engineer.
