= Katie Kellner =

American distance runner (born 1991)

Personal information
- Born: August 4, 1991 (age 35) West Windsor, New Jersey, United States

Sport
- Country: United States
- Events: Marathon, half marathon
- College team: Cornell University
- Team: Craftsbury Green Racing Project

Achievements and titles
- Personal bests: Marathon: 2:32:48; Half Marathon: 1:12:58; 10 km: 32:58

Katie Kellner (born August 4, 1991) is an American distance runner and coach who specializes in the marathon. She was an NCAA All-American at Cornell University before transitioning to long-distance road races after college. Kellner competed in the U.S. Olympic Trials marathon in 2016, 2020, and 2024.

== Early life ==
Kellner grew up in West Windsor, New Jersey, and attended West Windsor-Plainsboro High School South. She was a standout in cross country, placing 27th at the Footlocker National Cross Country Championship. She continued her running career at Cornell University, where she was a three-time All-American and clocked times of 32:58 for 10,000 meters and 16:01 for 5,000 meters.

== Career ==
After graduating in 2013, Kellner initially continued racing on the track, placing 8th at the 2014 USA Outdoor Championships in the 10,000 meters. In the fall of 2014, she moved up in distance to the half marathon, clocking a time of 1:14:41 in Philadelphia. This performance qualified her for the 2016 United States Olympic Trials Marathon.

At the Olympic Trials in Los Angeles, Kellner persevered through hot, sunny conditions to place 28th in a time of 2:43:47 in her debut marathon.

In 2017, Kellner placed 19th at the USA Half Marathon Championship and 21st at the USA 20km Championship. She closed the year in Sacramento at the California International Marathon (CIM), recording a time of 2:41:07, which qualified her for the 2020 United States Olympic Trials.

The following year, Kellner placed in the top 10 at the USA 10km Championship, the Indianapolis Half Marathon, and the Philadelphia Half Marathon.

In 2019, Kellner dealt with injuries, anxiety, and panic attacks, which resulted in her withdrawing from the Boston Marathon. She regained her form in time for the 2020 U.S. Olympic Trials Marathon, where she placed 57th of nearly 500 women on a hilly course through downtown Atlanta.

As of 2020, she was living in Boston and pursuing a Masters degree in public health at Boston University. When the COVID-19 pandemic negatively impacted her work as a biostatistician, she made the decision to pursue coaching as a full-time career.

Kellner had a strong 2022 season, winning the New Bedford Half Marathon and Hartford Half Marathon, while also placing 29th at the Boston Marathon. She closed the year at the California International Marathon, where she ran a time of 2:35:24 to qualify for the 2024 United States Olympic Trials.

In the fall of 2023, Kellner ran her personal-best at the Berlin Marathon, clocking a time of 2:32:48.

At the 2024 U.S. Olympic Trials Marathon, Kellner placed 37th of 137 women on a hot, sunny day in Orlando. She came back a few months later to place 22nd at the Boston Marathon in a time of 2:38:19.

== Personal ==
As of 2024, Kellner lives in Boston and works as a personal running coach. She made national headlines in 2019 when she saved a drowning man and a dog from the Chestnut Hill Reservoir in Boston. At the time, Kellner was 3 miles into an 8 mile easy run. She noticed the man in distress, removed her running shoes, entered the water, and pulled the man to safety. She completed the last 5 miles of her run later in the day.
