= Holly Clarke =

American distance runner (born 1991)

Personal information
- Born: February 3, 1991 (age 35) Lincoln, Massachusetts, United States

Sport
- Country: United States
- Events: Marathon, half marathon
- College team: Johns Hopkins University
- Team: Peninsula Distance Club

Achievements and titles
- Personal bests: Marathon: 2:34:54; 10 km: 34:01

Holly Clarke (born February 3, 1991) is an American distance runner and coach. She was an NCAA All-American in cross country at Johns Hopkins University before focusing on the marathon after college. Clarke competed in the U.S. Olympic Trials marathon in 2020 and 2024.

== Early life ==
Clarke grew up in Lincoln, Massachusetts, and began running in seventh grade. At Lincoln-Sudbury Regional High School, her cross country team won two state championships. She attended Johns Hopkins University, where she was a two-time All-American in cross country and led her team to two NCAA Championships in 2012 and 2013.

== Career ==
Clarke began running marathons in 2015 after moving to San Francisco and joining the Impala Racing Team. She competed in the Boston Marathon and New York City Marathon in 2016 and 2017, respectively, but did not run faster than 3:12.

She improved substantially in 2018, qualifying for the 2020 United States Olympic Trials (marathon) with a time of 2:43:04 at the California International Marathon in Sacramento.

At the Olympic Trials in Atlanta, Clarke placed 83rd of nearly 500 women in a time of 2:43:08.

In December 2021, Clarke returned to Sacramento and dropped her marathon best by over 6 minutes to 2:36:52 at the California International Marathon. The following year, she lowered her time further to 2:34:49 to qualify for the 2024 United States Olympic Trials (marathon) in Orlando.

At the Olympic Trials, Clarke placed 62nd of 137 women in a time of 2:39:55. She followed that up in the fall with a 24th-place finish at the 2024 New York City Marathon.

== Personal ==
As of 2024, Clarke lives in San Francisco and is studying for a master's degree in organizational development. She is also a personal running coach.
