= Annmarie Tuxbury =

American distance runner (born 1994)

Personal information
- Born: April 16, 1994 (age 32) New Hartford, Connecticut, United States

Sport
- Country: United States
- Events: Marathon, half marathon
- College team: Bryant University
- Team: ZAP Endurance

Achievements and titles
- Personal bests: Marathon: 2:30:04; Half Marathon: 1:12:00

Annmarie Tuxbury is an American distance runner who specializes in the marathon. She ran collegiately for Bryant University before shifting to longer distances after graduating. She competed in the U.S. Olympic Trials marathon in 2020 and 2024.

== Early life ==
Tuxbury grew up in New Hartford, Connecticut and attended Northwestern Regional High School, graduating in 2012. She was an All-State runner four times and won the 2011 Connecticut Class M Cross Country Championship. Tuxbury enrolled at Bryant University, where she ran times of 17:14 for 5,000 meters and 36:18 for 10,000 meters, but she never qualified for an NCAA Championship.

== Career ==
=== 2016 to 2021 ===
The summer after graduating from college, Tuxbury placed 20th at the 2016 USA 20 km Championship in New Haven, CT. She improved on that in 2017 with an 18th-place finish, and she cracked the top ten in 2018, placing 8th.

In 2019, Tuxbury placed 2nd at the Richmond Half Marathon in a time of 1:12.37, which qualified her for the 2020 United States Olympic Trials (marathon) in Atlanta.

New England Runner Magazine named Tuxbury the Runner of the Year in 2018 and 2019.

At the Olympic Trials, Tuxbury placed 35th out of nearly 500 women with a time of 2:39:05. In the fall of 2020, Tuxbury ran the #2 times in US history for 15k, 10 miles and one hour on the track.

In 2021, she notched another top-10 finish at the USA 20 km Championship. Later that year at the USA Half Marathon Championship, Tuxbury placed 20th in a time of 1:14:46.

=== 2022 to Present ===
She returned to marathoning at the 2022 Boston Marathon, where she placed 23rd. Less than two months later, Tuxbury won the Vermont City Marathon in a time of 2:39:19. That summer, she logged top-20 finishes at the Beach to Beacon 10K and Falmouth Road Race.

In the fall of 2022, Tuxbury won the Hartford Half Marathon, and two months later she clocked a time of 2:31:31 at the California International Marathon. This result qualified her for the 2024 United States Olympic Trials (marathon).

Tuxbury placed 30th in the 2023 Chicago Marathon. In February 2024, she claimed 61st of 163 women at the Olympic Trials Marathon in Orlando. Her personal-best half marathon (1:12:00) and marathon (2:30:04) came later in 2024 at the Garry Bjorklund Half and California International Marathon, respectively. She also won the 2024 Hartford Half Marathon.

Tuxbury placed sixth at the 2026 Grandma's Marathon in a time of 2:35:00, which qualified her for the 2028 U.S. Olympic Trials.

As of December, 2022, she joined the elite racing team, ZAP Endurance, and is based in Blowing Rock, North Carolina.

== Personal ==
In addition to running, Tuxbury works as a statistical analyst for Warren Rogers Associates.
