= Christine Ramsey =

American distance runner (born 1982)

Personal information
- Born: November 13, 1982 (age 43) Royersford, Pennsylvania, United States

Sport
- Country: United States
- Event(s): Marathon, half marathon
- College team: Syracuse University

Achievements and titles
- Personal best(s): Marathon: 2:39:33; Half Marathon: 1:15:48; 10 miles: 56:53

Christine Ramsey is an American long-distance runner who specializes in the marathon. She ran track and cross country collegiately for Syracuse University before transitioning to longer distances. Ramsey competed in the U.S. Olympic Trials Marathon in 2012, 2016, and 2020.

== Early life ==
Ramsey grew up in Royersford, Pennsylvania and attended the Agnes Irwin School. She never ran competitively in high school; instead, she played soccer, volleyball, and lacrosse. Ramsey attended Syracuse University and walked on to the lacrosse team in her first year. However, when she realized she wouldn't get any playing time until her junior or senior year, she quit and joined the cross country team. Ramsey placed as high as 70th at the Big East Championship and 47th at the ECAC Championship.

== Career ==
Ramsey found more success at longer distances after college. She placed 12th at the 2009 New York City Marathon in a time of 2:44:37, which qualified her for the 2012 U.S. Olympic Trials Marathon.

In 2011, she logged top-10 finishes at the Broad Street Run and the Philadelphia Half Marathon. Ramsey competed at the 2012 U.S. Olympic Trials Marathon in Houston but was unable to finish.

She placed seventh in a national-class field at the 2014 Twin Cities Marathon with a time of 2:39:33, which qualified her for the 2016 U.S. Olympic Trials Marathon. Ramsey notched victories at the Washington Rock n' Roll Half and Pike's Peak 10K in 2014.

At the 2016 Olympic Trials Marathon in Los Angeles, Ramsey placed 145th in hot, sunny weather. In 2017 and 2018, Ramsey focused on shorter distances, as she logged top 20 finishes at the Broad Street Run in back-to-back years.

At the 2019 California International Marathon, Ramsey placed 14th in a time of 2:41:13, which qualified her for the 2020 United States Olympic Trials (marathon). At the Olympic Trials in Atlanta, Ramsey placed 123rd out of nearly 400 women.

Ramsey placed third in the 2023 Austin 3M Half Marathon.

== Personal ==
Ramsey lives in Austin, Texas with her husband, Duriel Hardy, who is also an accomplished marathon runner. Ramsey is a master's student in the Department of Nutritional Sciences at the University of Texas.
