= Ben Brewster (soccer, born 1992) =

American professional soccer player (born 1992)

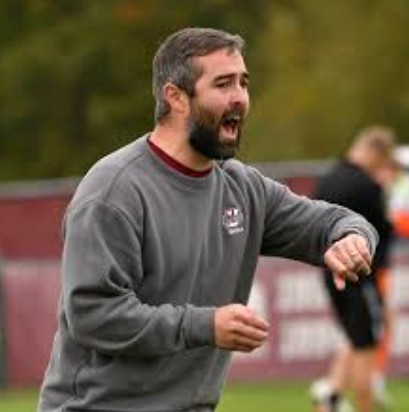

Personal information
- Full name: Benjamin Brewster
- Date of birth: March 29, 1992 (age 34)
- Place of birth: Cape Elizabeth, Maine, United States
- Height: 1.86 m (6 ft 1 in)
- Position: Defender

Team information
- Current team: San Francisco City FC
- Number: 5

College career
Years	Team	Apps	(Gls)
2011–2014	Bowdoin Polar Bears		

Senior career*
Years	Team	Apps	(Gls)
2013–2014	Seacoast United Phantoms	23	(1)
2015	Tulsa Roughnecks	23	(0)
2016	San Francisco City FC	0	(0)

Managerial career
- 2017–2018: UMass Minutemen (assistant)
- 2019–2023: UMass Minutemen (associate head coach)
- 2024 -: Bates College (head coach)
- * Club domestic league appearances and goals as of November 5, 2023

Ben Brewster (born March 29, 1992) is an American professional soccer player and coach who most recently played as a defender for San Francisco City FC. Brewster is currently the Head Coach for the Bates College men's soccer team. Brewster graduated from Cape Elizabeth High School in 2010, where he was also a standout lacrosse player, and from Bowdoin College in 2015.

== Career ==
=== Early career ===
Brewster played college soccer at Bowdoin College between 2011 and 2014, where he was named the NESCAC Rookie of the Year following his freshman season, earned second team All-Conference honors after his sophomore year and first team All-Conference honors after each of his final two seasons. Brewster was also named First Team All-New England following his junior and senior seasons. Brewster was named a First Team All-American his senior year by the National Soccer Coaches Association of America. He also played lacrosse at Bowdoin, earning honorable mention All-American honors his senior year.

Brewster also appeared for USL PDL club Seacoast United Phantoms in 2013 and 2014.

=== Professional ===
Brewster signed with United Soccer League club Tulsa Roughnecks in February 2015. For the 2016 season, he was the captain of San Francisco City FC in the United Soccer League Premier Development League.

=== Coaching ===
Brewster joined the UMass Minutemen coaching staff prior to the 2017 season as an assistant coach. In 2019, he was promoted to Associate Head Coach. On February 19, 2024, it was announced that Brewster would become the head coach of the Bates College men's soccer team starting with the Fall 2024 season.
