= International School of Indiana =

Coordinates: 39°50′00″N 86°11′10″W

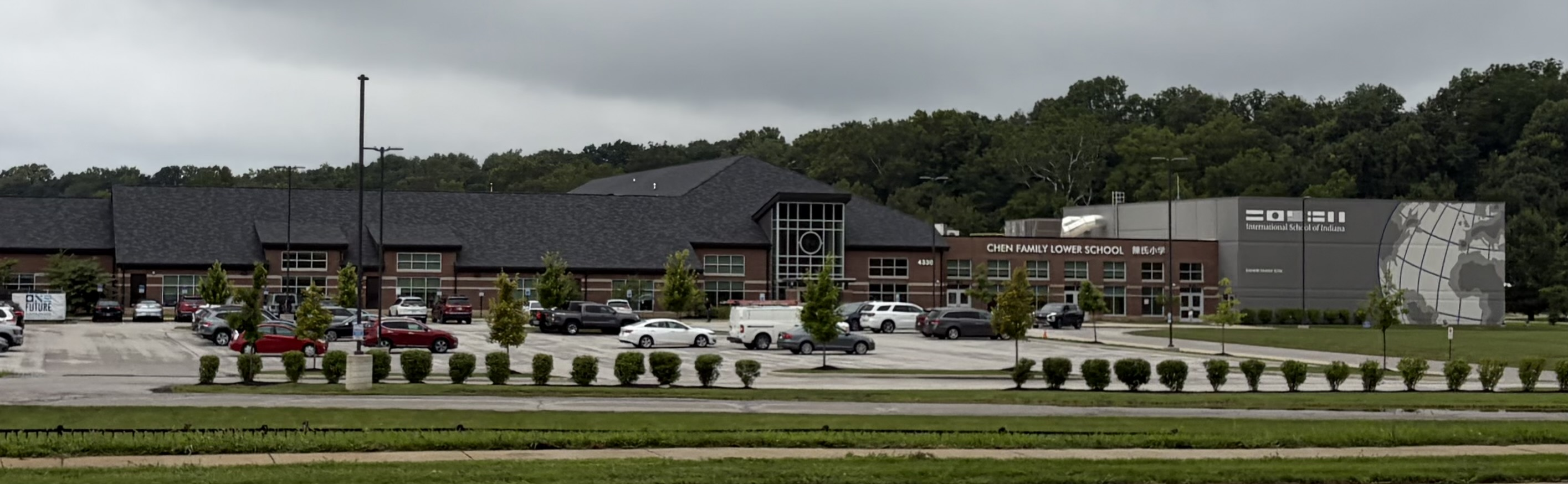
- ISI in 2026

Location
- 4330 North Michigan Road; Indianapolis, Indiana 46208; United States

Information
- School type: International
- Motto: Ready for the World Stage
- Established: 1994
- Head of school: Elizabeth Head
- Grades: 3YOP-12
- Enrollment: 600+
- Average class size: 14
- Language: English, French, Spanish, Mandarin
- Hours in school day: 8
- Campus size: 65 Acres (3 Buildings)
- Colours: Blue & Orange
- Athletics: Golf, Tennis, Cross Country, Soccer, Volleyball, Basketball, Swimming, Lacrosse, Track and Field
- Athletics conference: Pioneer
- Mascot: Gryphon
- Yearbook: ISI Yearbook
- Website: www.isind.org

The International School of Indiana (ISI) is an independent private school in Indianapolis, Indiana. The school was founded in 1994. ISI offers classes from pre-kindergarten to 12th grade with more than 600 students. ISI is recognized as an IB (International Baccalaureate) World School, offering immersion programs for its students in the languages of Spanish, French, and Mandarin Chinese. Students can also begin learning a third language in Grade 6.

The school was formerly affiliated with the Agency for French Education Abroad (AEFE).

== History ==
In 1991, the Indiana Humanities Council Task Force was established to address Indiana's position in an international world. The task force report, entitled Indiana in a Changing World – A Strategy for Action, emphasized the need for Indiana to:

- Participate in the world community and world economy
- Attract foreign companies and specialist employees
- Make Indiana students more internationally competitive

One of the report's major recommendations led to the creation of the International School of Indiana in 1994.

In July 2002, ISI was authorized to enroll Juniors and Seniors into the IB Diploma Programme (DP), officially making the institution an IB School. In 2004, the school saw its first graduating class, made up of 8 students.

In 2009, the IB Primary Years Programme (PYP) and Middle Years Programme (MYP) began to be incorporated into the curriculum, providing for grades 1–5 and 6–10 respectively. ISI received certification for both programs in 2011, giving them the distinction as the only school in the midwestern United States to offer IB, MYP and PYP diplomas to its students. In addition, ISI announced the launch of its Mandarin Chinese immersion program for students in the same year.

In 2014, ISI was recognized by The Washington Post as one of the most challenging high schools in the country, due to their longstanding IB Diploma Programme and because all students are required to take the college-level exams at the end of their senior year.

One of six international schools in the United States, ISI offers an integrated International Baccalaureate curriculum that is transferable to schools around the world.

== Campus ==
The school campus is located in Indianapolis' Butler-Tarkington neighborhood, on 60 wooded acres north of the Indianapolis Museum of Art. Prior to 2023, Grades 6 through 12 were located at 4330 Michigan Road, and pre-kindergarten through Grade 5 classes were held at the school's 49th Street building.

In 2019, the campaign "ONE ISI" was established in the interest of unifying the lower and upper school campuses by the 2021–22 academic year.

On December 13, 2020, the school broke ground on the $13.5 million Chen Family Lower School building. The building, serving students age 3 to grade 5, opened in August 2022 and marked the official unification of the school's campus.

=== Replica Eiffel Tower ===
In April 2025, the school announced that it was selected as the permanent home of a 66-foot-tall, 14,000-pound replica Eiffel Tower. The art piece was originally constructed by Indiana Sports Corp, F.A. Wilhelm Construction, and the Latinas Welding Guild as a set piece for the 2024 United States Olympic trials (swimming).

== Curriculum ==
The school has an accredited IB Diploma Programme, Middle Years Programme, and the Primary Years Programme.

== Extracurricular activities ==
Student groups and activities include the Aid to Congo Project, Habitat for Humanity, Literary Arts Society, Model United Nations, an Oxfam banquet, student government, the Timmy Foundation, the Gryphon Voices choir, art club, yearbook and various sports.

== Diversity ==
ISI is one of the most diverse private high schools in the state of Indiana, with the Indiana Department of Education reporting the following ethnic breakdown for the 2019–2020 school year: 44.5% White, 27.4% Asian, 9.1% Hispanic, 9.1% Black, 8.5% Multiracial, 0.6% Pacific Islander, and 0.6% Native American.

In addition to hosting a variety of different cultures across campus, ISI has always pursued an economically diverse student body, with 40% of students receiving financial aid of some kind in 2019.

== Heads of School ==
- Alain Weber: 1994–2007
- David Garner: 2007–2018
- Craig P. Anderson (interim): 2018
- Elizabeth Head: 2019–present

== Notable alumni ==
- Noah Droddy, distance runner
- Chase Infiniti, actress

== See also ==
- List of schools in Indianapolis
