= Cape Elizabeth High School =

Location
- 345 Ocean House Road; Cape Elizabeth, Maine 04107; United States; 43°35′31″N 70°13′44″W

Information
- School type: Public, high school
- School board: Cape Elizabeth School Board
- NCES District ID: 2303930
- Superintendent: Christopher Record
- CEEB code: 200955
- NCES School ID: 230393000108
- Principal: John Springer
- Staff: 77
- Teaching staff: 45.00 (FTE)
- Grades: 9–12
- Enrollment: 471 (2024-2025)
- Average class size: 16.7
- Student to teacher ratio: 10.47
- Language: English
- Hours in school day: 6 5/12
- Classrooms: 43
- Rival: Mountain Valley High School
- Accreditation: NEASC
- National ranking: No. 5,251
- Publication: Bartleby
- Alumni: Joan Benoit, Clare Egan, Role Model, Matt Rand
- Website: cehs.cape.k12.me.us
- Last updated: 8 April 2022

Cape Elizabeth High School (CEHS) is a public high school in Cape Elizabeth, Maine, United States. It is one of six schools in Maine to have been named a National Blue Ribbon School multiple times by the U.S. Department of Education.

== Academics ==
The graduation rate for the Cape Elizabeth High School class of 2019 was 99 percent.

The school offers high-level education through courses like CP Chemical Science and CP Biological Sciences (which may have been renamed to just CP Biological Science in 2021).

== Extracurricular activities ==
About 90 percent of students were active in an extracurricular activity during the 2018–19 academic year.

=== Athletics ===
There are 36 teams at CEHS, 23 of which are varsity. Sports include soccer, football, field hockey, volleyball, golf, cross country, basketball, swimming and diving, indoor track, outdoor track, ice hockey, Nordic skiing, alpine skiing, baseball, softball, lacrosse, outdoor track, tennis, and sailing.

About 80 percent of students were active on an athletic team during the 2018–19 academic year.

=== Clubs and activities ===
Extracurricular activities include the National Honor Society, Boys'/Girls' State, Robotics Team, Math Team, Yearbook Committee, Prom Committee, Graduation Committee, Student Rescue, Amnesty International, Siddartha School Project, Gay/Straight Alliance, Ultimate Frisbee, and the BBQ Team.

== Budget and funding ==
The budget of Cape Elizabeth High School is part of the $29,857,097 annual budget of the Cape Elizabeth School Department.

The Cape Elizabeth Educational Foundation (CEEF) is a private not-for-profit charitable corporation that lends additional support to programming in all of the Cape Elizabeth Schools. Their mission statement reads (in part): "CEEF is committed to fostering innovation and excellence in the Cape Elizabeth school district by 1. Funding initiatives that fall outside the school budget; 2. Partnering with the school district to help achieve its vision; and 3. Building community-wide support for the benefit of our schools."

== Controversy ==
In September 2019, a Cape Elizabeth High School student named Aela Mansmann left a sticky note reading "There's a rapist in our school and you know who it is" in one of the school's bathrooms, sparking panic among students. The school suspended her for bullying shortly after, provoking controversy among the community.

== Notable alumni ==
- Joan Benoit – American distance runner (born 1957)
- Ben Brewster – American professional soccer player (born 1992)
- Clare Egan – American biathlete (born 1987)
- Erik Messerschmidt - cinematographer (born 1980, graduated 1999)
- Matt Rand – American distance runner (born 1991)
- Role Model – American singer-songwriter (born 1997)

== Notable teachers ==
- Heather Sanborn – attorney, businesswoman, Maine Public Advocate, member of the Maine Senate
