= Pardon Ndhlovu =

Zimbabwean marathon runner

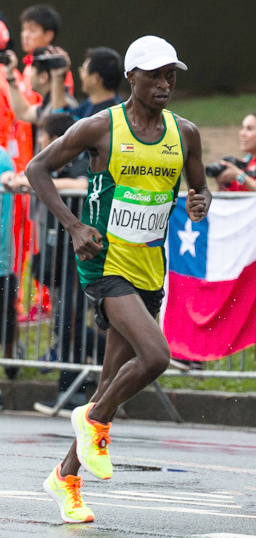
- Ndhlovu at the 2016 Olympics

Personal information
- Born: August 23, 1987 (age 38)
- Education: UNC Pembroke, Augusta University
- Height: 167.6 cm (5 ft 6 in)
- Weight: 54 kg (119 lb)

Sport
- Sport: Athletics
- Event: Marathon
- Coached by: Gary Aycock, Adam Ward

Achievements and titles
- Personal best: 2:15:04 (2022)

Pardon Ndhlovu (pronounced end-low-voo, born August 23, 1987) is a marathon runner from Zimbabwe. He competed at the 2016 Summer Olympics and placed 41st. Ndhlovu was a four-time All-American cross country and track & field performer at UNC Pembroke where he earned his bachelor's degree in 2013.

Ndhlovu earned his MBA degree in December 2015 at Augusta University and worked there as an assistant coach. He is an ambassador for a social enterprise that distributes clean water worldwide. He is also vice president of SEFAYE (Sports and Education for African Youth Empowerment).

On 13 March 2023, Ndhlovu became eligible to represent the United States internationally. In 2024, Ndhlovu competed at the 2024 United States Olympic trials in the marathon, finishing 143rd.
