= Aaron Gruen =

American-Austrian distance runner

Personal information
- Born: 28 January 1999 (age 27) Munich, Germany

Sport
- Country: Austria
- Events: Marathon, half marathon
- College team: Brown University
- Team: Puma

Achievements and titles
- Personal bests: Marathon: 2:09:53; Half Marathon: 1:01:14

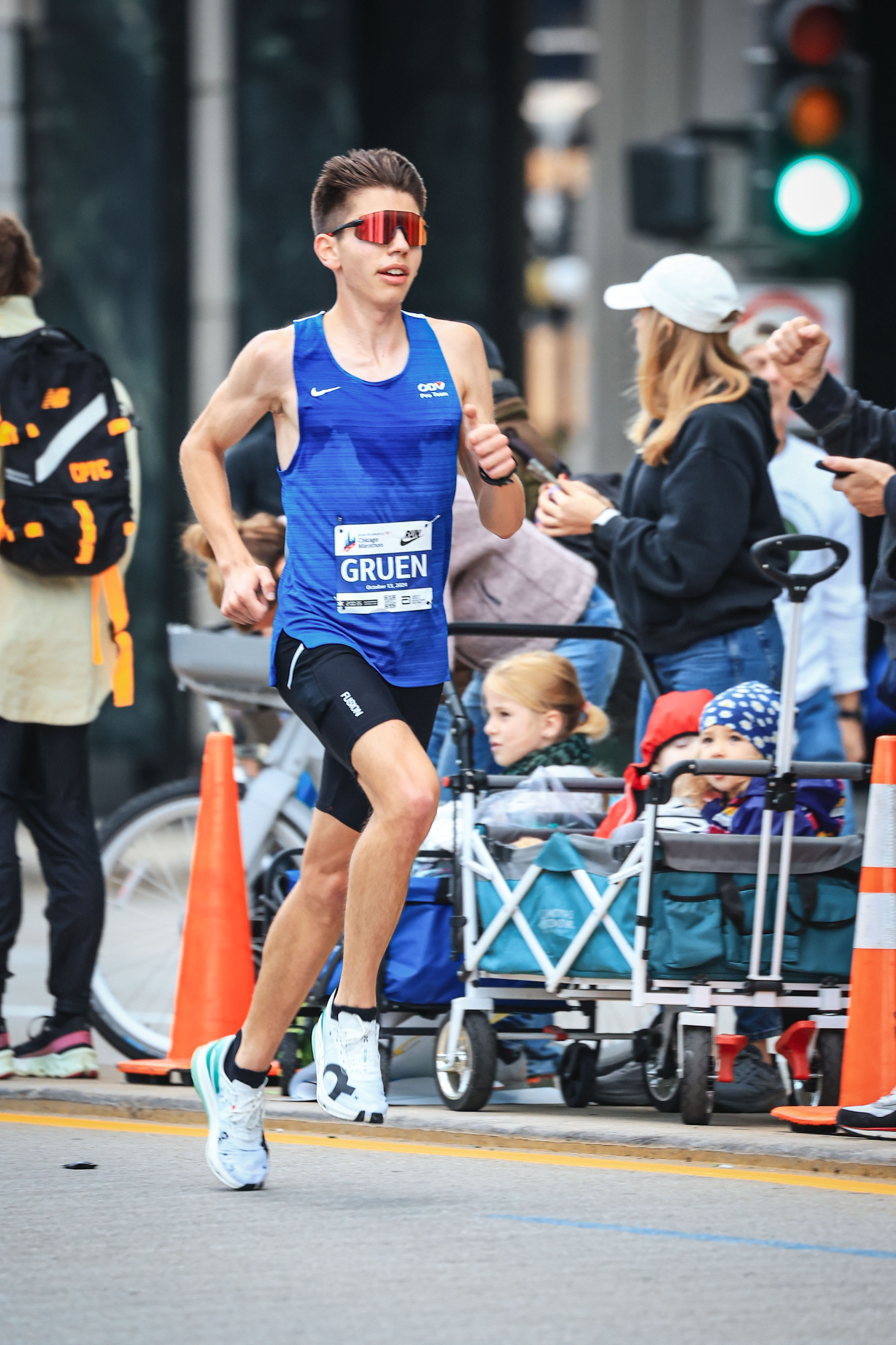
Aaron Gruen at the Chicago Marathon 2024

Aaron Gruen is an Austrian long-distance runner. He has held the Austrian record for the marathon distance since March 30, 2025 with a time of 2:09:53. He has held the Austrian record for the half marathon distance since January 11, 2026 with a time of 1:01:14. Gruen also competed in the 2024 United States Olympic Trials Marathon.

== Early life ==
Gruen was born and raised in Munich, Germany, before relocating to England for secondary school, where he attended St. Edward's High School in Oxford. Gruen then enrolled at Brown University, where he majored in Music and Chemistry. He did not run competitively in high school or college.

== Career ==
Gruen began his running career in 2021. He finished third in the Providence Marathon with a time of 2:34. A month later, he finished fourth at the San Francisco Marathon. In his final year at Brown University, he developed a training relationship with Bob Rothenberg, the university's former coach. In April 2022, he ran the Boston Marathon in 2:21. He is currently part of the Rhode Island Track Club in Providence, Rhode Island, where he is coached by Canadian Kurt Benninger.

Gruen started recording national-class results in 2023. He placed ninth at the McKirdy Micro Marathon in a time of 2:15:56, which qualified him for the 2024 United States Olympic Trials (marathon). In addition to running over 100 miles per week in preparation for marathon racing, Gruen is an accomplished musician. He practices the cello three to eight hours per day.

At the 2024 Olympic Trials in Orlando, Gruen was unable to finish in hot, sunny weather. He bounced back with a 1:04:35 half marathon in Hamburg, Germany over the summer. He also won the 2024 NYCRUNS Brooklyn Half Marathon. In the fall, he placed 24th at the Chicago Marathon in a time of 2:14:21.

Gruen's best performance came in March 2025 when he clocked a time of 2:09:53 at the McKirdy Micro Marathon in New York. This mark broke the previous Austrian national record.

Gruen broke Günther Weidlinger's long-standing record in the half marathon at the Houston Half Marathon on January 11, 2026, in a time of 1:01:14, beating the previous 18-year-old record by 28 seconds.

Gruen represented Austria at the 2025 World Championship Marathon in Tokyo, placing 52nd of 88 men with a time of 2:22:07.

== Personal ==
Gruen, who lives in the US, was granted Austrian citizenship in 2022. His grandfather had fled Vienna as a Jewish refugee at the beginning of the Second World War. Gruen therefore received Austrian citizenship as a descendant of someone persecuted by the Nazis. His father is Keith Gruen (American) and his mother is Regine Mund (German). In 2025, Gruen will begin studying medicine at Harvard University, which he has so far postponed in favor of his sporting career.

He is currently in a relationship with runner Katie Goldenberg.

== Personal Records ==
- Half marathon: 1:01:14 h, January 11, 2026, in Houston, Texas (Austrian record)
- Half marathon (downhill): 1:02:47 h, February 8, 2025, in Mesa, Arizona
- Marathon: 2:09:53 h, March 30, 2025, in Congers, New York (Austrian record)
