= Track Shack =

Retail running store in Orlando, Florida

- Company type: Private
- Industry: Sporting goods retail
- Founded: 1977
- Founders: Local runners and investors
- Headquarters: Orlando, Florida, U.S.
- Area served: Central Florida
- Key people: Jon Hughes (co-owner); Betsy Hughes (co-owner)
- Products: Running footwear, apparel, accessories
- Services: Gait analysis, training programs

Track Shack is a specialty running store in Orlando, Florida. Founded in 1977, the store caters to runners and walkers with footwear, apparel, and training resources. It has been co-owned since 1983 by Jon Hughes and Betsy Hughes, who expanded it into a community hub for running and fitness.

Track Shack also helps organize local road races through its sister company, Track Shack Events.

== History ==
Track Shack opened in September 1977 in Orlando, founded by a group of local running enthusiasts. Jon Hughes, a competitive runner and 1977 Seminole State College graduate, became the store’s manager in 1978 and soon hired Betsy Mackenzie (now Betsy Hughes).

In 1983, the couple married and purchased Track Shack from its original partners. Under the Hughes’ leadership, the store became a centerpiece of Orlando’s running community, hosting group runs, training programs, and local races.

In 1994, the Hughes founded the Track Shack Youth Foundation, a nonprofit aimed at promoting youth fitness. Supported by race proceeds, the foundation has donated over $2 million to schools and community fitness programs.

== Operations ==
Track Shack remains headquartered on North Mills Avenue in Orlando. The single-location, family-run business is known for personalized fitting and community engagement. It specializes in running shoes, apparel, and accessories, and offers gait analysis and training advice to runners of all levels.

The Hughes remain active in day-to-day operations; their son Chris Hughes has joined management.

== Events and community impact ==
Track Shack is closely tied to Event Marketing & Management International (EMMI), which operates as Track Shack Events, founded in 1991 to produce road races. In 1994, the Hughes partnered with Walt Disney World to create the Walt Disney World Marathon, now part of the runDisney series.

Locally, Track Shack Events organizes the annual Orlando Corporate 5K, founded in 1995 and now the region’s largest road race.

Track Shack also hosts an annual Running Series (formerly Grand Prix Series) including the Winter Park Road Race 10K and the OUC Orlando Half Marathon.

== Reception and recognition ==
Track Shack and its owners have received multiple honors for contributions to running retail and community health. In 2015, Jon and Betsy Hughes were named Florida’s Retailers of the Year by the Florida Retail Federation. Runner’s World and other outlets have profiled the store as a model for community-driven specialty retail.

Track Shack has been listed among the Best Running Stores in America, and the Hughes were inducted into the Running Specialty Hall of Fame (2008) and Running USA Hall of Champions (2009).

== See also ==
- runDisney – Walt Disney World running events co-founded by Track Shack
- Orlando, Florida
