= Nathan Martin =

American long-distance runner

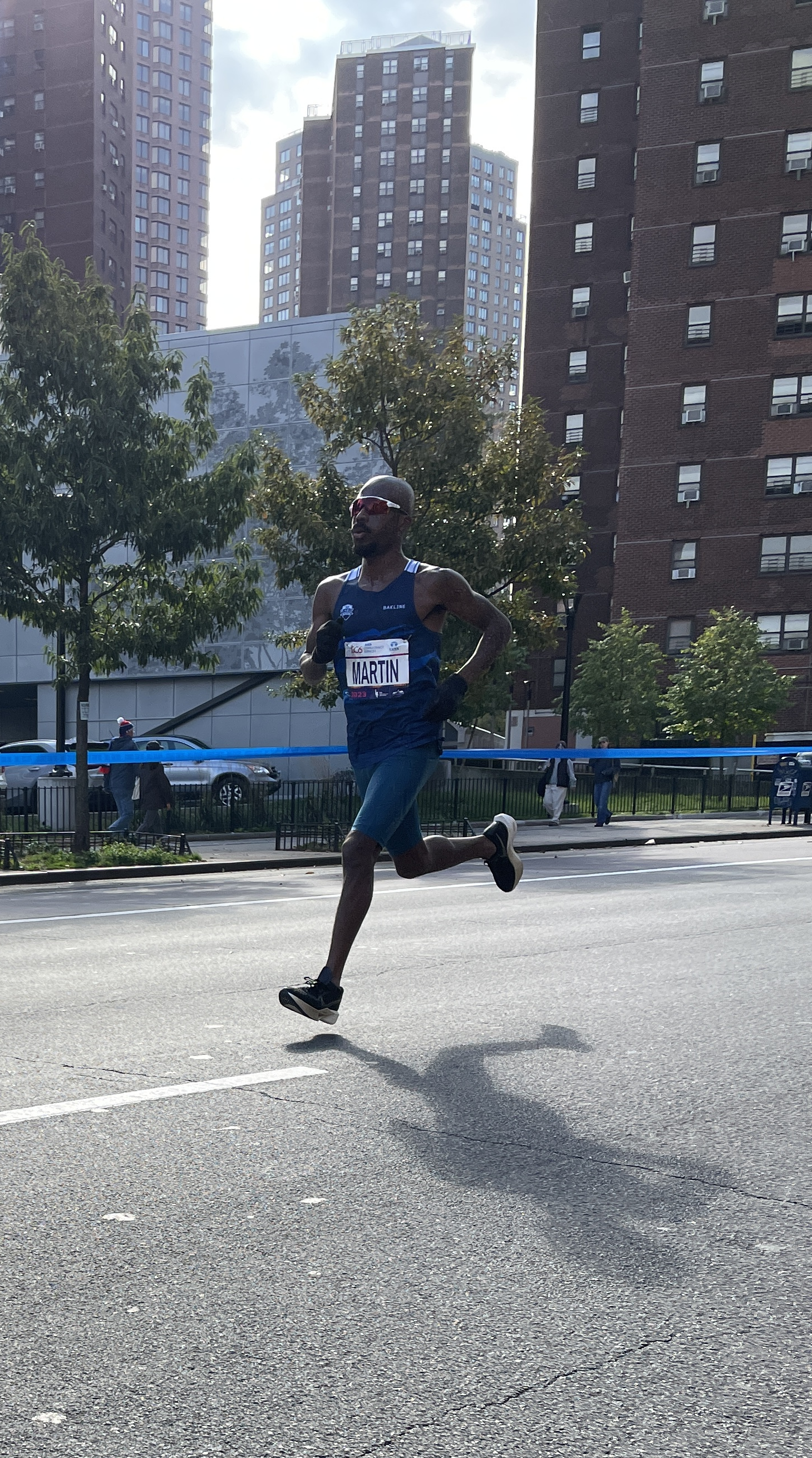
Nathan Martin at the 2023 New York City Marathon.

Nathan Martin (born December 18, 1989) is an American long distance runner, who specializes in the marathon. He was the winner of the 2026 Los Angeles Marathon. His personal best is 2:10:45, set at the 2023 Grandma's Marathon in Duluth, Minnesota, the record for the fastest American-born black marathoner.

== Running career ==
As an amateur, Martin competed for Spring Arbor University where he was an NAIA champion. In 2016, he finished 23rd in the 2016 United States Olympic Trials in the marathon.

In 2020, he competed in the 2020 United States Olympic Trials. The same year, Martin ran the fastest marathon time by a black man born in the United States at the Marathon Project with a time of 2:11:05, besting Herman Atkins 1979 time of 2:11:52.

Martin finished 8th at the 2021 New York City Marathon, while also being the third American finisher. His personal best is 2:10:45, set at the 2023 Grandma's Marathon in Duluth, Minnesota, setting the record as the fastest American-born black marathoner.

In 2026, Martin narrowly won the Los Angeles Marathon in 2:11:17, winning by 0.01 seconds over Kenyan runner, Michael Kimani Kamau.

== Coaching career ==
Martin is the cross country coach at Jackson High School in Jackson, Michigan.
