= Eddie Mulder =

Off-road Motorcycle Racer

Eddie Mulder (born 1943) is an American former motorcycle racer and stuntman, known for his success in off-road, steeplechase (TT), dirt track, and vintage motorcycle racing. He gained national recognition in 1960 when, at the age of 16, he won the Big Bear Run, one of the most demanding off-road motorcycle races in the United States.

== Early life ==
Eddie Mulder was born in 1943 in California, United States. He began riding motorcycles at the age of eight and entered organized competition by the age of 11. Growing up in Southern California, he was immersed in a strong motorcycle racing culture that influenced his early development as a rider and competitor.

== Big Bear Run ==
In 1960, Mulder won the 39th Big Bear Run, a 150-mile off-road motorcycle race held in the Southern California desert. Riding a Royal Enfield, he competed against several hundred riders under extreme conditions of heat and terrain. Only a small percentage of entrants completed the race, and Mulder's victory at the age of 16 made him the youngest winner in the event's history. The win is widely regarded as a landmark moment in American off-road motorcycle racing.

== Professional racing career ==
Following his Big Bear Run victory, Mulder turned professional in the early 1960s and began competing in American Motorcyclist Association (AMA) events. He achieved success across multiple disciplines, including dirt track and steeplechase (TT) racing, and won several AMA District 37 championships.

In 1965, Mulder won the Peoria TT, one of the most prestigious AMA Grand National events. In 1966, he achieved a rare distinction by winning all three major AMA steeplechase national races in a single season. Throughout his professional career, he was closely associated with Triumph motorcycles and became known for his aggressive yet precise riding style.

In later interviews, Mulder reflected on the physical demands of TT racing, his competition with other leading AMA riders of the era, and his eventual decision to step away from full-time professional racing.

== Later career and vintage racing ==
After retiring from full-time professional competition in the mid-1970s, Mulder remained active in motorcycle racing through vintage events. He achieved multiple class victories at the Pikes Peak International Hill Climb and continued competing well into later decades, demonstrating long-term adaptability and skill.

Mulder later founded the West Coast Vintage Dirt Track Series, an organization established to preserve historic racing motorcycles and promote traditional dirt track competition in the United States.

== Stunt work ==
In addition to his racing career, Mulder worked as a professional motorcycle stuntman. He performed motorcycle stunts for film and television productions and served as a riding double for actors, including Clint Eastwood. His stunt work extended his influence beyond motorsports into popular culture and entertainment.

== Royal Enfield Bear 650 ==
Mulder's 1960 Big Bear Run victory later inspired the launch of the Royal Enfield Bear 650, a production motorcycle introduced as a tribute to the historic desert race and Mulder's achievement. The model draws on styling and design cues associated with classic off-road racing and explicitly references Mulder's win as part of its heritage narrative.

== Honors and legacy ==
Mulder was inducted into the AMA Motorcycle Hall of Fame in recognition of his achievements and contributions to motorcycle racing. His Big Bear Run victory remains one of the most frequently cited accomplishments in American off-road racing history, and his career is regularly referenced in motorcycle journalism and manufacturer heritage narratives.
