= Makenna Myler =

American athlete

Makenna Myler is an American track and field athlete from the state of Utah who competed in the 2020 United States Olympic Trials, where she placed 14th, approximately 7 months after giving birth to her daughter. She ran one mile in 5 minutes 25 seconds approximately 1 week prior to giving birth. Myler ran for the BYU Cougars in college.
