= Kelsey Bruce =

American long-distance runner

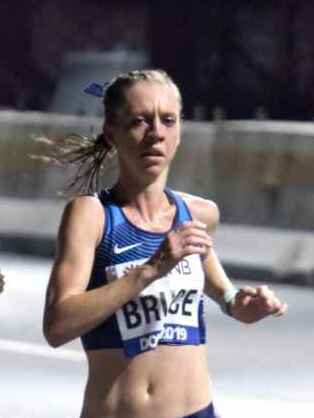

Personal information
- Born: October 27, 1992 (age 34)

Sport
- Country: United States
- Sport: Long-distance running

Kelsey Bruce (born October 27, 1992) is an American long-distance runner. In 2019, she competed in the women's marathon at the 2019 World Athletics Championships held in Doha, Qatar. She finished in 38th place.

In 2018, she competed in the 2018 New York City Marathon.
