= Abdihakem Abdirahman =

American long-distance runner

Abdi Abdirahman
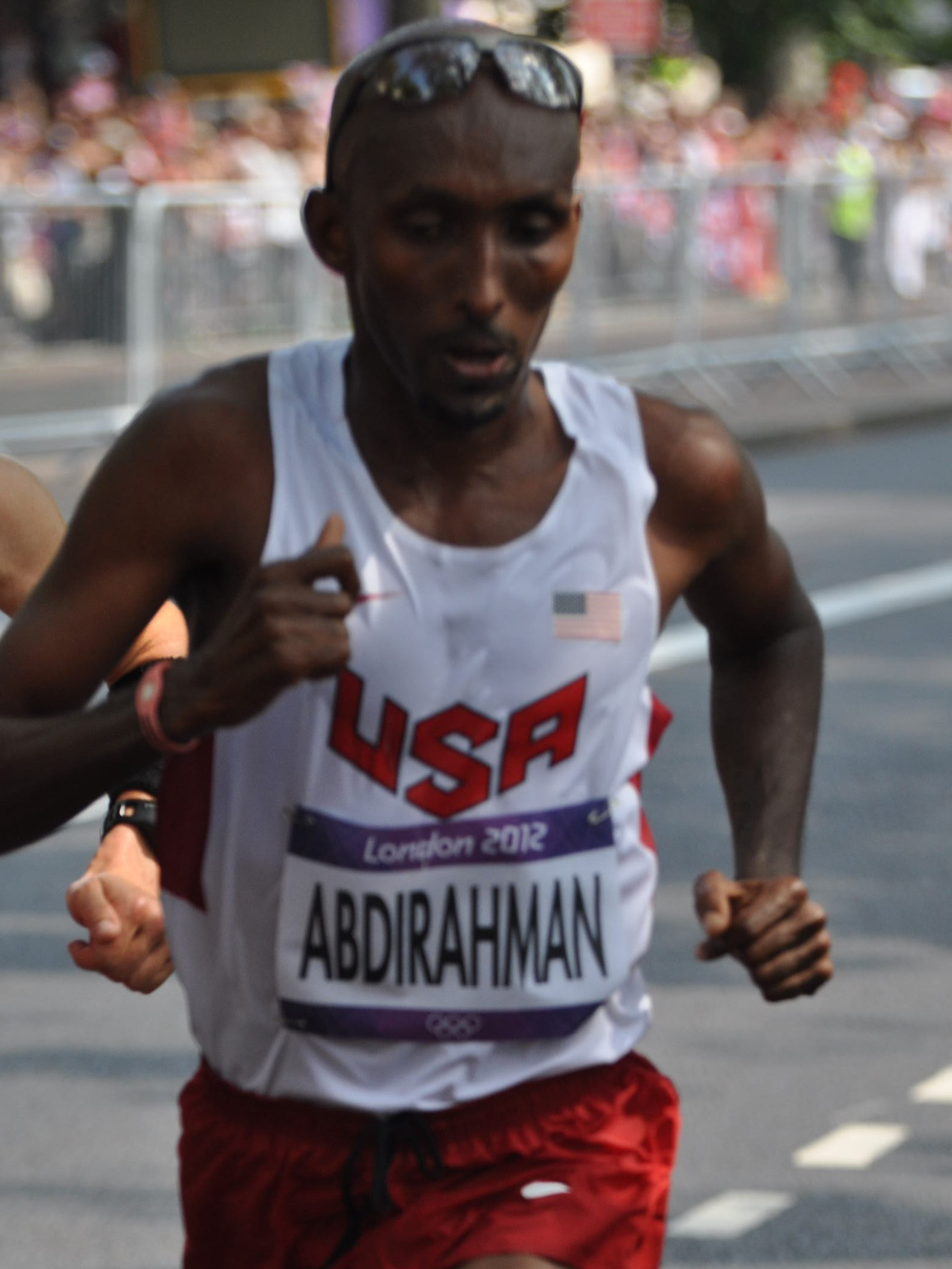
- Abdirahman at the 2012 Olympics

Personal information
- Full name: Abdihakim Abdirahman
- Nationality: American
- Born: January 1, 1977 (age 49) Mogadishu, Somalia
- Height: 5 ft 10 in (1.78 m)
- Weight: 134 lb (61 kg)

Sport
- Sport: Track, Long-distance running
- Events: 10,000 meters, Marathon

Achievements and titles
- Personal bests: 3000 meters: 7:47.63; 2-mile: 8:29.26; 5000 meters: 13:13.32; 10,000 meters: 27:16.99; Marathon: 2:08:56
Medal record
Representing United States
World Cross Country Championships
Bronze medal – third place	2001 Ostend	Team
World Marathon Majors
Bronze medal – third place	2016 New York City	Marathon

Abdihakim "Abdi" Abdirahman (Somali: Cabdihakiim Cabdiraxmaan, Arabic: عبد الحكيم عبد الرحمن; born January 1, 1977) is an American long-distance runner. He is a five-time Olympian competing for the United States in the 10,000 meters and the marathon.

== Running career ==
Born in Mogadishu, Somalia, Abdirahman graduated from Tucson High School in 1995 and attended Pima Community College before transferring to the University of Arizona for his junior and senior years. He was inducted into the Pima County Sports Hall of Fame located in Tucson in 2019. He became a U.S. citizen in 2000.

At Arizona, Abdirahman was named the 1998 Pacific-10 Conference Cross Country Male Athlete of the Year. He finished second at the 1998 NCAA Cross Country Championships.

Abdirahman competed in five straight IAAF World Cross Country Championships between 2000 and 2004, with a best finishing place of 11th in 2002.

He competed in the 10,000 meters at the 2000 and 2004 Summer Olympics, finishing tenth and fifteenth, respectively. He also finished seventh in the 10,000 meters at the 2007 World Championships in Osaka, his best finish after placing 19th in 2003 and 13th in 2005.

In 2008, Abdirahman won the 10,000 meters at the US Olympic Trials. He also was the men's division champion of the Monument Avenue 10K in Richmond, VA.

His personal best time in the 10,000 meters is 27:16.99 minutes, achieved in June 2008 at Hayward Field during the Prefontaine Classic.

On January 14, 2012, Abdirahman qualified for the 2012 Olympics by finishing third in the U.S. Olympic Marathon Trial in Houston. At the 2012 Olympics he dropped out of the marathon before the halfway mark with a knee injury.

Abdirahman finished 3rd in the 2016 TCS New York City Marathon in a time of 2:11:23.

At the 2020 United States Olympic Trials (marathon) in Atlanta, Abdirahman finished 3rd with a time of 2:10:03, one second behind Jake Riley securing his place on a fifth Olympic team, and, at 43, becoming the oldest American runner ever to make the Olympic team. In the men's marathon at the 2020 Summer Olympics he finished 41st.
