= 2020 United States Olympic Trials (marathon) =

2020 United States Olympic Team Trials - Marathon
- Dates: February 29, 2020
- Host city: Atlanta, Georgia
- Level: Senior
- Type: Outdoor
- Events: 2 (men: 1; women: 1)

The 2020 U.S. Olympic Team Trials – Marathon was held on Saturday, February 29, 2020, in Atlanta, Georgia, to determine the American athletes who would compete in the marathon event at the 2020 Summer Olympics in Tokyo, Japan. The race was hosted by the city of Atlanta, in partnership with Atlanta Track Club, USA Track & Field, and the United States Olympic & Paralympic Committee. Field sizes were historically large for the event, with 260 men and 512 women qualifying to compete. On the women's side, the top three finishers were Aliphine Tuliamuk, Molly Seidel, and Sally Kipyego. For the men, Galen Rupp defended his victory from the 2016 Trials, while Jake Riley and Abdi Abdirahman finished second and third, respectively. Despite the 2020 Olympics being postponed to 2021 due to the COVID-19 pandemic, all six qualified athletes from the Trials competed in the Olympic Marathon, which took place in Sapporo, Japan, in August 2021.

== Qualification ==
Entry standards for acceptance in the race were as follows:

Men's Marathon: 2:19:00

Men's Half Marathon: 1:04:00

Women's Marathon 2:45:00

Women's Half Marathon: 1:13:00

Qualifying performances must have occurred between September 1, 2017 and January 19, 2020 on a USATF-certified course. In total 233 men qualified via a marathon time, while 27 gained entry with a half marathon time. For women, 500 achieved the marathon standard and only 12 hit the half marathon mark. Large field sizes, particularly for the women, prompted USATF to tighten entry standards for the 2024 United States Olympic trials (marathon).

== Course ==
Runners started at Centennial Olympic Park and completed three 8-mile loops through downtown Atlanta, followed by a 2.2 mile loop to the south of downtown. The final 800 meters took runners by State Farm Arena and Mercedes-Benz Stadium before the finishing stretch at Centennial Olympic Park. The terrain was hilly, with 1,389 feet of elevation gain. Weather in Atlanta at race time was cool, sunny, and windy, with temperatures in the upper 40s and wind gusts up to 30 mph. The combination of hills and wind contributed to one quarter of the men's field dropping out of the race (175 of 235 finished). Women fared slightly better, with 390 finishers out of 475 starters.

== Spectators ==
Due in part to the large field sizes, nearly 200,000 spectators supported the athletes on the streets of Atlanta. Additionally, the race was broadcast live on NBC and attracted 3.8 million viewers. This figure was over three times higher than viewership for the 2016 Trials in Los Angeles.

== Results ==
Men's Marathon
Place	Athlete	Time
1st place, gold medalist(s)	Galen Rupp	2:09:20
2nd place, silver medalist(s)	Jake Riley	2:10:02
3rd place, bronze medalist(s)	Abdi Abdirahman	2:10:03
4	Leonard Korir	2:10:06
5	Augustus Maiyo	2:10:47
6	Martin Hehir	2:11:29
7	CJ Albertson	2:11:49
8	Jonas Hampton	2:12:10
9	Colin Bennie	2:12:14
10	Matt McDonald	2:12:19
11	Tyler Pennel	2:12:34
12	Scott Fauble	2:12:39
13	Haron Lagat	2:13:04
14	Brendan Gregg	2:13:27
15	Colin Mickow	2:13:45
16	Elkanah Kibet	2:13:52
17	Josh Izewski	2:14:15
18	Bernard Lagat	2:14:23
19	Scott Smith	2:14:49
20	Nico Montanez	2:15:02
21	Sam Chelanga	2:15:04
22	Jim Walmsley	2:15:05
23	Ahmed Osman	2:15:26
24	Enoch Nadler	2:15:30
25	Grant Fischer	2:15:32
26	Connor McMillan	2:15:55
27	Jared Ward	2:15:55
28	Daniel Kremske	2:16:18
29	Ian Butler	2:16:26
30	Timothy Young	2:16:31
31	Ben Payne	2:16:42
32	Mike Sayenko	2:16:47
33	Chris Melgares	2:16:59
34	Andrew Epperson	2:17:00
35	Dylan Marx	2:17:09
36	Malcolm Richards	2:17:13
37	Gregory Billington	2:17:21
38	Matt Llano	2:17:22
39	Kevin Lewis	2:17:36
40	Jon Phillips	2:17:51
41	Craig Leon	2:17:54
42	Will Norris	2:17:57
43	Patrick Campbell	2:18:01
44	Sergio Reyes	2:18:14
45	Craig Hunt	2:18:18
46	Dylan Belles	2:18:18
47	Kyle King	2:18:20
48	Brogan Austin	2:18:36
49	Eric Finan	2:18:54
50	Evan Landes	2:19:08
51	Oscar Medina	2:19:28
52	JJ Santana	2:19:30
53	Tim Ritchie	2:19:34
54	Jonathan Aziz	2:19:35
55	Julian Heninger	2:19:39
56	Joel Reichow	2:20:05
57	Steven Martinez	2:20:10
58	Stephen Vangampleare	2:20:16
59	Caleb Kerr	2:20:21
60	Louis Serafini	2:20:27
61	Charlie Lawrence	2:20:40
62	Jackson Neff	2:20:50
63	Rajpaul Pannu	2:20:55
64	Chase Weaverling	2:20:58
65	Jason Lynch	2:21:03
66	James Atkins	2:21:13
67	Garret Lee	2:21:14
68	Will Cross	2:21:16
69	Nathan Martin	2:21:26
70	Swarnjit Boyal	2:21:29
71	Nathan Kwan	2:21:38
72	Evan Gaynor	2:21:46
73	Bijan Mazaheri	2:21:54
74	Austin Bogina	2:21:57
75	Jacob Law	2:22:11
76	Charlie Hurt	2:22:17
77	Daniel Carney	2:22:22
78	Alan Peterson	2:22:30
79	Stewart Harwell	2:22:30
80	Josh Baden	2:22:36
81	Nick Golebiowski	2:22:47
82	Tyler Andrews	2:22:51
83	Jon Mott	2:22:54
84	Nick Caprario	2:22:59
85	Tim Chichester	2:23:19
86	Kieran O' Connor	2:23:57
87	Tyler McCandless	2:24:04
88	Daniel Docherty	2:24:07
89	Kurt Roeser	2:24:08
90	John Dewitt	2:24:09
91	Stan Linton	2:24:10
92	Anthony Costales	2:24:21
93	Travis Morrison	2:24:24
94	Ryan Root	2:24:24
95	Henry Sterling	2:24:40
96	Daniel Meteer	2:24:45
97	Reed Fischer	2:24:48
98	Zach Beavin	2:24:52
99	Turner Wiley	2:24:54
100	Dan Vassallo	2:24:59
101	Kyle Wyatt	2:25:04
102	Anthony Tomsich	2:25:14
103	Ben Fletcher	2:25:17
104	James Quattlebaum	2:25:18
105	Alex Taylor	2:25:19
106	Kevin Colon	2:25:21
107	Joe Stilin	2:25:24
108	Matt Rand	2:25:42
109	Chris Boyle	2:25:49
110	Mark Messmer	2:25:53
111	Alex Monroe	2:25:57
112	Brandon Mull	2:25:57
113	Jordan Kyle	2:25:59
114	Nate Orndorf	2:26:09
115	Ryan Smith	2:26:14
116	Brian Harvey	2:26:37
117	Matt Blume	2:26:38
118	Jeff Seelaus	2:26:40
119	Duriel Hardy	2:26:41
120	Matt Lenehan	2:26:47
121	Andrew Williams	2:26:56
122	Gregory Leak	2:27:35
123	Joe Niemiec	2:27:50
124	Alec Baldwin	2:28:03
125	Dan Harper	2:28:10
126	Brett Lustgarten	2:28:21
127	Tyson Miehe	2:28:24
128	Rory Tunningley	2:28:29
129	Steven Underwood	2:28:34
130	Matt Herzig	2:28:48
131	Jason Simpson	2:28:51
132	Max Storms	2:28:57
133	Jacob Andrews	2:29:13
134	Matt Welch	2:29:18
135	Brendan Martin	2:29:34
136	Clayton Young	2:29:46
137	Dave Marks	2:30:03
138	Nick Edinger	2:30:08
139	David Fuentes	2:30:11
140	Patrick Reaves	2:30:25
141	Charles Remillard	2:30:27
142	Quinlan Moll	2:30:29
143	Chris Burnett	2:30:54
144	Robert Murphy	2:30:58
145	Adam Dalton	2:31:18
146	Chris May	2:31:34
147	Everett Hackett	2:30:36
148	Aaron Dinzeo	2:31:55
149	Johnny Rutford	2:31:57
150	Patrick Geoghegan	2:32:00

Women's Marathon
Place	Athlete	Time
1st place, gold medalist(s)	Aliphine Tuliamuk	2:27:23
2nd place, silver medalist(s)	Molly Seidel	2:27:31
3rd place, bronze medalist(s)	Sally Kipyego	2:28:52
4	Des Linden	2:29:03
5	Laura Thweatt	2:29:08
6	Stephanie Bruce	2:29:11
7	Emma Bates	2:29:35
8	Kellyn Taylor	2:29:55
9	Nell Rojas	2:30:26
10	Julia Kohnen	2:30:43
11	Sarah Sellers	2:31:48
12	Lindsay Flanagan	2:32:05
13	Brittany Charboneau	2:33:14
14	Kate Landau	2:34:07
15	Keira D'Amato	2:34:24
16	Rebecca Wade	2:35:12
17	Jennifer Bergman	2:36:11
18	Bethany Sachtleben	2:36:34
19	Jaci Smith	2:36:34
20	Carrie Dimoff	2:36:41
21	Kelsey Bruce	2:36:51
22	Kaitlyn Peale	2:37:12
23	Christina Vergara Aleshire	2:37:20
24	Lauren Weaver	2:37:48
25	Molly Grabill	2:37:57
26	Jordan Hasay	2:37:57
27	Bria Wetsch	2:37:58
28	Georgia Porter	2:38:07
29	Taylor Ward	2:38:11
30	McKale Montgomery	2:38:20
31	Gina Rouse	2:38:41
32	Kristen Findley	2:38:59
33	Samantha Bluske	2:38:59
34	Autumn Ray	2:39:05
35	Annmarie Tuxbury	2:39:05
36	Dakotah Lindwurm	2:39:08
37	Missy Rock	2:39:12
38	Lindsey Anderson	2:39:17
39	Stephanie Pezzullo	2:39:19
40	Whitney Macon	2:39:40
41	Heather Lieberg	2:39:47
42	Emma Huston	2:39:57
43	Danna Herrick	2:39:59
44	Ashley Paulson	2:40:07
45	Amanda Marino	2:40:09
46	Tara Welling	2:40:10
47	Mara Olson	2:40:16
48	Sharon Thompson	2:40:24
49	Cristina McKnight	2:40:29
50	Meghan Bishop	2:40:43
51	Mary Schneider	2:41:08
52	Tristin Van Ord	2:41:14
53	Rena Elmer	2:41:22
54	Courtney Olsen	2:41:36
55	Marit Sonnesyn	2:41:37
56	Emma Spencer	2:41:40
57	Katie Kellner	2:41:42
58	Mackenzie Caldwell	2:41:54
59	Rachel Drake	2:41:58
60	Laurie Knowles	2:41:58
61	Hannah Cocchiaro	2:42:02
62	Kimi Reed	2:42:04
63	Veronica Graziano	2:42:06
64	Jessie Vickers	2:42:09
65	Natalie Severy	2:42:09
66	Bailey Drewes	2:42:11
67	Sarah Reiter	2:42:12
68	Caitlin Phillips	2:42:16
69	Allie Schaich	2:42:22
70	Mia Behm	2:42:26
71	Sophie Seward	2:42:26
72	Carrie Mack	2:42:27
73	Elizabeth Northern	2:42:32
74	Alyssa Schneider	2:42:41
75	Jennifer Masamitzu	2:42:44
76	Tierney Wolfgram	2:42:47
77	Theresa Hailey	2:42:49
78	Peyton Thomas	2:42:54
79	Kristen Heckert	2:42:55
80	Annie Dear	2:42:55
81	Lindsay Nelson	2:42:56
82	Bonnie Keating	2:43:01
83	Holly Clarke	2:43:08
84	Jessa Victor	2:43:12
85	Elizabeth Gregory	2:43:15
86	Liza Reichert	2:43:18
87	Hannah Christensen	2:43:19
88	Alexandra Bernardi	2:43:22
89	Heidi Caldwell	2:43:23
90	Andrea Masterson	2:43:24
91	Sara Mostatabi	2:43:28
92	Christina Murphy	2:43:31
93	Michelle Parks	2:43:31
94	Amanda Nurse	2:43:35
95	Gracie Griffith	2:43:36
96	Dot McMahan	2:43:39
97	Harriott Kelly	2:43:40
98	Obsie Birru	2:43:44
99	Amy Schnittger	2:43:47
100	Fionna Fallon	2:43:50
101	Margaret Vido	2:43:50
102	Joanna Reyes	2:43:51
103	Olivia Ballew	2:43:53
104	Gabi Anzelone	2:43:59
105	Tavyn Lovitt	2:44:02
106	Meghan Curran	2:44:02
107	Kim Maloney	2:44:04
108	Maura Linde	2:44:13
109	Sarah Cummings	2:44:14
110	Kate Sanborn	2:44:18
111	Lindsay Carrick	2:44:22
112	Phebe Ko	2:44:23
113	Anne Flower	2:44:24
114	Paula Pridgen	2:44:25
115	Ashlee Powers	2:44:29
116	Cindy Anderson	2:44:33
117	Camille Matonis	2:44:34
118	Caroline Austin	2:44:45
119	Natalie Gingerich Mackenzie	2:44:54
120	Ann Kirkpatrick	2:44:59
121	Ellie Pell	2:44:59
122	Alexis Zeis	2:45:04
123	Christine Ramsey	2:45:04
124	Maria Scavuzzo	2:45:10
125	Michelle Langan	2:45:12
126	Jenelle Deatherage	2:45:15
127	Andrea Imhof	2:45:18
128	Caitlin Chrisman	2:45:18
129	Alyssa Bloomquist	2:45:20
130	Teal Burrell	2:45:27
131	Madeline Duhon	2:45:27
132	Kelly Griffin	2:45:33
133	Meagan Boucher	2:45:35
134	Elizabeth Bigelow	2:45:39
135	Stephanie Knast	2:45:42
136	Meriah Earle	2:45:46
137	Brittney Feivor	2:45:46
138	Jessica Chichester	2:45:49
139	Ashley Brasovan	2:46:00
140	Moira O'Connor Lenth	2:46:08
141	Ladia Albertson-Junkins	2:46:08
142	Sakiko Minagawa	2:46:15
143	Andrea Pomaranski	2:46:15
144	Erin Heenan	2:46:28
145	Eva Vail	2:46:28
146	Megan Gentes	2:46:29
147	Ann Alyanak	2:46:32
148	Caitlin Standifer	2:46:36
149	Siobhan O' Connor	2:46:38
150	Susanna Sullivan	2:46:39

The above charts display only the top 150 finishers. For full results and profiles on all participants, see the external links at the bottom of this article.
