= Nell Rojas =

American triathlete and long-distance runner (born 1987)

Personal information
- Nationality: American
- Born: November 27, 1987 (age 38) Boulder, Colorado, U.S.
- Height: 5 ft 6 in (168 cm)

Sport
- Country: United States
- Sport: Athletics; Track and field
- Event: Marathon
- College team: Northern Arizona University
- Team: Nike
- Turned pro: 2010
- Coached by: Ric Rojas
Medal record
Women's athletics
Representing the United States

Nell Rojas (born Nov 27, 1987) is an American triathlete, long-distance runner, coach, business owner, and winner of the 2019 Grandma's Marathon. She also competed at the 2020 USA Olympic Marathon Trials and finished in 9th place.

== Running career ==
Rojas ran collegiately for Northern Arizona University, where she graduated with a bachelor's degree in exercise science. As a senior, she won the Big Sky Conference championship in the 3000-meter steeplechase three times and once for the 5000 meters. Rojas represented her school at the 2009 NCAA Division I Women's Outdoor Track and Field Championships. She also ran in the 2007 and 2008 NCAA Women's Division I Cross Country Championship.

The first road race she ran out of college was the California International Marathon, where she finished in seventh place with a time of 2:31:23. Following in her father Ric Rojas' footsteps, she raced in the competitive Bolder Boulder 10K race in 2019. She said she competed to make her father, who was also her coach, proud and carry on the family tradition (Ric had won 40 years prior). Halfway in to Nell Rojas' race, a win looked dim. She began falling behind, but then in a sprint to the finish, she beat her competitor and won the race with a time of 34:32. Next she worked her way up to running Grandma's Marathon. She ran an average 5:40 mile, finishing in first with a time of 2:28:06. Her time was three minutes less than her past best and met the US Olympic marathon trials standard.

In Atlanta, Georgia, at the U.S. Woman's Olympic Trials Marathon on February 29, 2020, Rojas went out with the lead pack, which stayed together for most of the race. Rojas finished in the top 10, crossing the line at 2:30:29.

Rojas raced her fastest half marathon January at the Houston Half Marathon, three months before the COVID-19 pandemic paused all competitive marathons. Her time of 1:10:45 placed her as the 27th woman, and the 13th US woman.

Rojas was the first American woman of the 2022 Boston Marathon.

== Personal life ==
Nell Rojas's father, Ric Rojas, was a professional runner and taught Rojas how to run. After playing basketball in high school, Rojas started cross country and track after realizing she was more successful at running than shooting hoops. Nell Rojas owns a gym and does personal training through Rojas Running.

== Achievements ==
2022 New York City Marathon 10th place, 2:28:32

2022 Boston Marathon 10th place, 2:25:57

2021 Boston Marathon 5th place, 2:27:12

2021 USATF 10-Mile Championship 1st place, 52:13

2020 U.S. Woman's Olympic Trials Marathon 9th place, 2:30:29

2019 Grandma's Marathon 1st place, 2:28:06

2019 USA Half Marathon Championships 8th place, 1:14:17

2019 Bolder Boulder 10k race 1st place, 34:32

2018 California International Marathon 7th place, 2:31:23

== See also ==
- Nell Rojas at World Athletics
