= Brooklyn Half Marathon =

American race

- Date: Usually the 3rd Saturday in May
- Location: New York City
- Event type: Road
- Distance: Half marathon 13.109 miles (21.097 km)
- Primary sponsor: RBC
- Established: 1983 (43 years ago)
- Course records: 1:03:05 (men); 1:11:24 (women)
- Participants: 30,341 finishers (2026)

The Brooklyn Half Marathon, currently branded as the RBC Brooklyn Half Marathon, is an annual half marathon run through New York City’s borough of Brooklyn. Since 2023, it has been the largest half marathon in the United States by participation, with over 30,000 runners. The race was founded in 1983 and is organized by New York Road Runners, which also administers the New York City Marathon.

== Course ==
The race begins southbound on Washington Avenue adjacent to the Brooklyn Botanic Garden, before turning northwest on Flatbush Avenue. Runners do a full circle of Grand Army Plaza before returning southeast on Flatbush Avenue and running along the border of Prospect Park. The course enters the park at Machate Circle on the southwest corner. Runners complete a full loop of Prospect Park in a counterclockwise direction. On the east side of the park (miles 4-5), the terrain is mostly uphill, while the west side of the park (miles 6-7) is mostly downhill. The 10 km marker is located near Bartel-Pritchard Square.

Runners exit the park at Machate Circle and proceed southbound on Ocean Parkway for approximately 5.5 miles. This stretch is predominantly flat. With less than a mile to go, runners turn west onto Surf Avenue, before joining the Coney Island Boardwalk at W 10th St. The final 200 meters of the race is on the wood surface of the boardwalk.

Due to the hills and warm, humid conditions, the Brooklyn Half can be a dangerous race for inexperienced runners. A competitor died in both the 2022 and 2025 events as a result of heat and exertion related symptoms.

== Prize Money ==
The top male, female, and non-binary finishers receive $2,000. There is also a category for Brooklyn residents, with male, female, and non-binary winners earning $500.
