= United States Olympic trials =

The United States Olympic trials are competitions held in certain sports to select the United States' participants in those sports at the Olympic Games. These events include:

- United States Olympic trials (curling)
- United States Olympic trials (diving)
- United States Olympic trials (gymnastics)
- United States Olympic trials (marathon)
- United States Olympic trials (swimming)
- United States Olympic trials (track and field)
- United States Olympic trials (wrestling)
