= Minnesota Distance Elite =

American distance running team

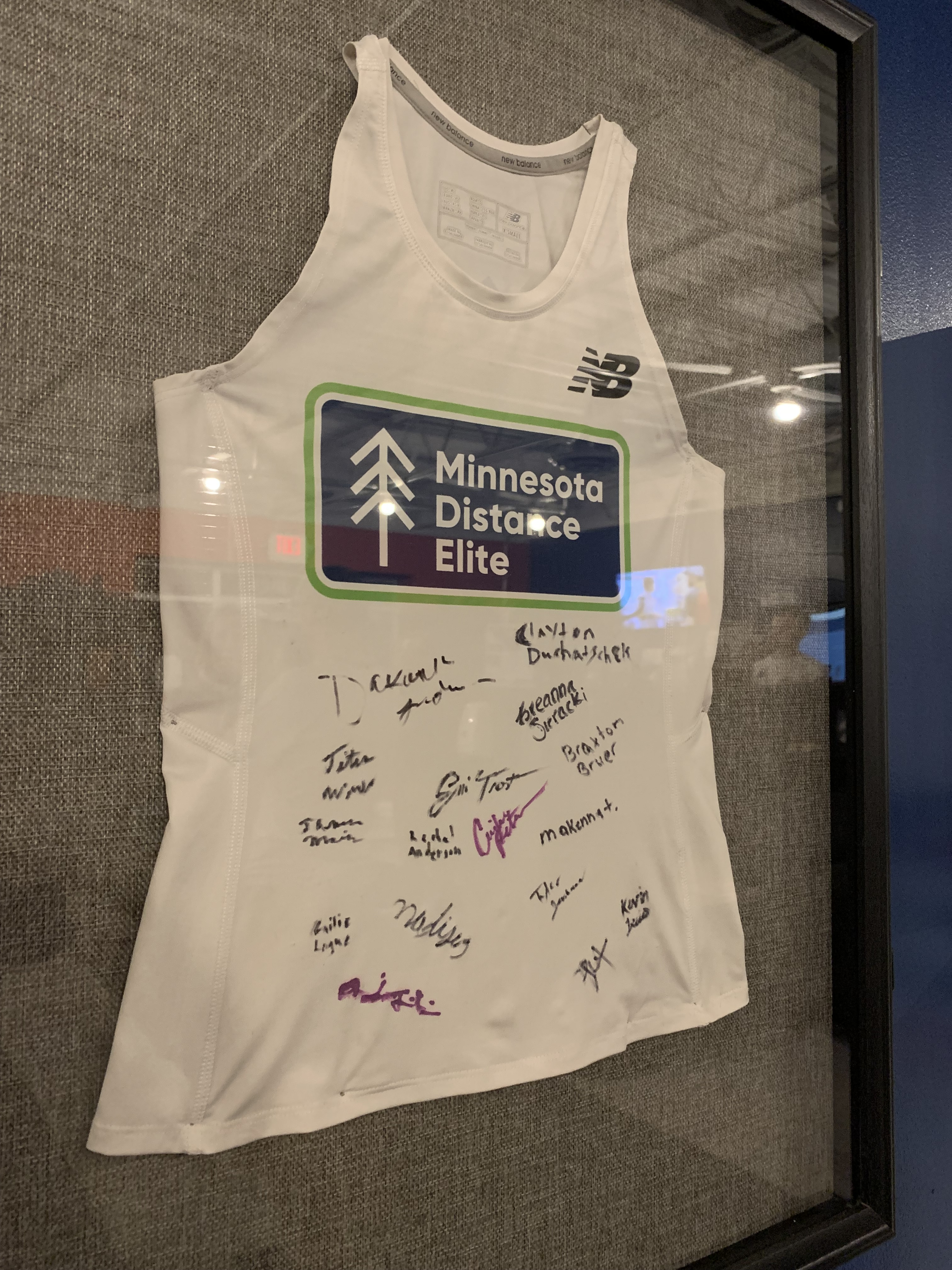
- Minnesota Distance Elite logo and signatures of team members
- Sport: long-distance running
- Founded: 2001
- Team history: previously known as Team USA Minnesota; Women's Team Records; 800 m: 2:00.04 (Heather Kampf, 2013); 1500 m: 4:01.48 (Gabriele Anderson, 2013); 1 mile (track): 4:27.23 (Heather Kampf, 2016); 3000 m: 8:42.64 (Gabriele Anderson, 2013); 3000 m steeplechase: 9:29.13 (Jamie Cheever, 2013); 5 km: 15:04.07 (Carrie Tollefson, 2004); 8 km: 25:56 (Katie McGregor, 2008); 10 km: 31:21.20 (Katie McGregor, 2005); 15 km: 49:20 (Dakotah Lindwurm, 2021); 10 Mile: 52:01 (Annie Frisbie, 2024); 20 km: 1:06:02 (Dakotah Lindwurm, 2021); Half marathon: 1:07:33 (Annie Frisbie, 2024); 25 km: 1:22:36 (Annie Frisbie, 2024); Marathon: 2:22:00 (Annie Frisbie, 2026) Men's Team Records; 800 m: 1:47.05 (Toby Henkels, 2003); 1500 m: 3:39.04 (Tanner Maier, 2024); 1 mile: 3:58.59 (Luke Watson, 2005); 3000 m: 7:46.19 (Josh Yeager, 2022); 3000 m steeplechase: 8:35.75 (Lyle Weese, 2008); 5 km: 13:29.51 (Biya Simbassa, 2016); 8 km: 22:42 (Andrew Carlson, 2008); 10 km: 28:23.93 (Joel Reichow, 2021); 15 km: 43:56 (Antonio Vega, 2010); 10 Mile: 46:38 (Josh Moen, 2009); 20 km: 59:04 (Jason Lehmkuhle, 2009); Half marathon: 1:01:54 (Antonio Vega, 2010); 25 km: 1:15:00.13 (Joel Reichow, 2025); Marathon: 2:10:37 (Joel Reichow, 2023)
- Location: Minneapolis–Saint Paul, Minnesota
- Head coach: Chris Lundstrom
- Manager: Cody Mikl

Minnesota Distance Elite, previously known as Team USA Minnesota, is a long-distance running team based in the U.S. state of Minnesota. The team is designed to support the running careers of post-collegiate athletes, supporting athletes from middle distance to the marathon. Minnesota Distance Elite is recognized as one of the top American running teams.

Runners apply to join the team, who have to be approved by the board of directors after reviewing the athlete's training history. The most important criteria for joining as of 2007 was steady improvement in performance.

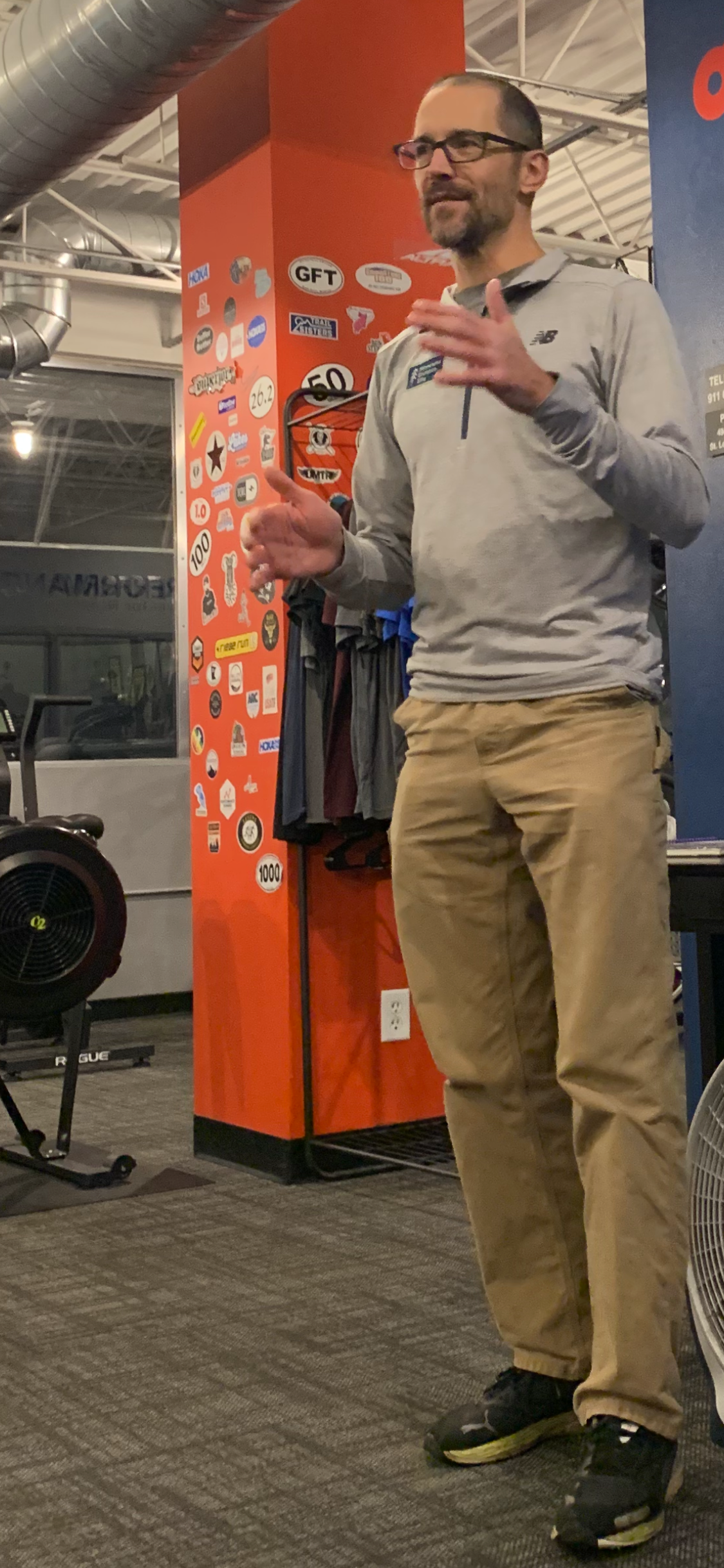
Minnesota Distance Elite coach Chris Lundstrom in December 2024

Chris Lundstrom has been the coach of Minnesota Distance Elite since 2017. Lundstrom heard the previous coach, Dennis Barker, was retiring and applied for the position.

Various marathons have sponsored Minnesota Distance Elite. Twin Cities in Motion, the organization that produces the Twin Cities Marathon, sponsored Team USA Minnesota at least between 2013 and 2017. This support provided a salary for the coach. As of 2015, the Pittsburgh Marathon was a sponsor of Team USA Minnesota allowing each athlete to earn a minimum of a $500 monthly stipend. As of 2002, the stipends varied from $450 to $850 per month. In 2014, the Houston Marathon Foundation announced it was donating $40,000 for elite athlete development, part of which was used by Team USA Minnesota. In general, participating runners generally need to supplement their income given the modest stipends earned from being part of the team. For example, in 2002 Carrie Tollefson and Katie McGregor worked at Run N Fun running store in Saint Paul, Minnesota. Gabriele Grunewald cited this financial support as being critical to keep going in the sport.

As of 2002, participating athletes could use athletic facilities at the University of Minnesota and Augsburg College.

== History ==
=== 2001 ===
Patricia Goodwin founded Team USA Minnesota in 2001 and hired the team's first coaching staff. From the start, Team USA Minnesota was half-women and half-men making it unique from other professional development running teams. She was inspired to start the team because the performance of U.S. distance runners was perceived as being poor at the 2000 Summer Olympics.

Running USA and USA Track & Field announced the founding of Team USA Minnesota in 2001. The first women's coach was Dennis Barker, the cross country and track coach at Augsburg University. The first men's coach was Steve Plasencia, the distance running coach at the University of Minnesota. Ditlev Larson served as an assistant men's coach. The team was started with a roster of nine runners including Carrie Tollefson who had been training in Florida until the creation of the team. At the time of its creation, Team USA Minnesota had a budget of $90,000 to $100,000 for athlete stipends and race travel funding. Team USA Minnesota also arranged for each athlete to have a health club membership, as well as housing; some women were given arranged housing in Edina, Minnesota while some men were given arranged housing in Saint Paul, Minnesota. As of 2002, participating athletes could get housing for $350 if they needed it. The team was originally supposed to have ten members, but Kelly Keeler dropped out after learning being on the team would require too much time away from her job.

The other Team USA training centers established at the same time include Hansons Running Shop Team USA Michigan, Team BrownStone USA New York, and Team USA California (now Mammoth Track Club).

Carrie Tollefson ran the first race as a Team USA Minnesota athlete at the Prefontaine Classic in 2001. Kim Kauls, Kurt Keiser and Kelly Mortenson were training for the New York City Marathon at the time and hoping to qualify for the US Olympic marathon trials. Chris Lundstrom ran the 2001 Grandma's Marathon where he was the first American finisher.

Turena Johnson-Lane joined Team USA Minnesota in 2001 to train for a year to prepare for the Olympic Trials in 2004, leaving an assistant coaching job at Luther College (Iowa) to do so.

The Twin Cities Marathon and Minnesota Distance Running Association held a fundraiser for Team USA Minnesota near Bde Maka Ska in July 2001 at which former Olympic runner Steve Holman spoke.

Kurt Keiser, Kelly Mortenson, Matt Gabrielson, Katie McGregor, Kristin Nicolini, and Turena Johnson-Lane competed at the Minnesota Distance Classic track meet in July 2001.

Katie McGregor competed at the Athletes Foot Mile in Lincoln, Nebraska in July 2001. She sought to qualify for the US Olympic trials in 2004 competing in the 10,000 metres.

Katie McGregor, Carrie Tollefson, Kim Kauls, Kelly Mortenson, and Matt Gabrielson competed in the Perfect 10k in Minneapolis, Minnesota, an event in which women started four minutes before the men and $25,000 of cash prizes were distributed to the first five finishers. Katie McGregor finished in fourth place with a time of 34:43.7 and won $2000 in prize money. McGregor and Tollefson ran together for the first three miles before Tollefson fell off the pace, however John Korir passed McGregor with a mile to go in the race.

Katie McGregor won the Twin Cities 10 Mile in 2001 with a time of 57:21.

Chris Lundstrom finished in 16th place at the 2001 New York City Marathon despite gastrointestinal issues with a time of 2:18:08, fast enough to qualify for the 2004 US Olympic marathon trials.

Matt Gabrielson and Turena Johnson-Lane competed in the USA Track and Field national cross country championships in Mobile, Alabama in December 2001. They both finished in 11th place in their respective 10,000 meter and 6,000 meter races respectively.

Katie McGregor won the Western Hemisphere Half Marathon in Culver City, California in December 2001 with at time of 1:18:09.

Matt Gabrielson was struck by a vehicle in December 2001 while running in Knoxville, Tennessee. He was released from a local hospital five hours later with seven staples in his head but didn't have any broken bones. He had to miss training in Albuquerque, New Mexico in January and February with the other nine members of Team USA Minnesota.

=== 2002 ===
Dennis Barker took over coaching the men's team while continuing to coach the women's team, becoming the sole coach of Team USA Minnesota until his retirement following the 2016 U.S. Olympic Track & Field Trials.

Carrie Tollefson, Katie McGregor and Kristen Nicolini qualified for the USATF Indoor Track & Field Championships in the 3,000 meters, with Tollefson finishing 3rd in 9:01.49, McGregor finishing 6th in 9:18.15 and Nicolini finishing 7th in 9:23.19.

Carrie Tollefson and Katie McGregor qualified for the USATF Outdoor Track & Field Championships. Tollefson finished 3rd in the 5,000 meters in 15:21.37, McGregor finished 3rd in the 10,000 meters in 32:17.49.

In February 2002, Carrie Tollefson set a fieldhouse record at the Minnesota Open track meet, running a mile in 4:37.44. Kristen Nicolini won the 3000 m race at the Penn State Invitational with a time of 9:25, and Turena Johnson won the 3000 meter race at the North Carolina State indoor meet in Chapel Hill, North Carolina with a time of 9:30.

Male runners from Team USA Minnesota also competed in the 12 km USATF cross country championships in Vancouver, Washington finishing in 4th place. Carrie Tollefson also finished 2nd in the USATF 4k championship race.

Kelly Mortensen ran in the Los Angeles Marathon, his first marathon since he finished 12th at the 2000 US Olympic marathon trials. He finished in 11th place with a time of 2:27:50, having faded in the second half of the race since he covered the first 13.1 miles (21.1 km) in 1:10:53. Turena Johnson Lane finished in 15th place at the Gate River Run 15 kilometres (9.3 mi) championship with a time of 52:59. Chris Lundstrom and Jason Lehmkuhle also competed in the 15 km championship race, finishing in 17th and 26th place among the men. Carrie Tollefson ran the world cross country championships in Dublin, Ireland in March 2002. She finished in 11th place in the 4.2 kilometres (2.6 mi) race. Katie McGregor ran the Shamrock Shuffle in Chicago, Illinois with a time of 26:49 in the 8 kilometres (5.0 mi) race, finishing third overall.

Training under Team USA Minnesota coach Dennis Barker, Tollefson was running consistently about 90 miles (140 km) per week, and sought to qualify for the 2004 Olympics in the 5000 or 10,000 meter races. She also hoped to break the US record of 14:45:35 set by Regina Jacobs. Likewise, Katie McGregor hoped to qualify for the 2004 Olympics in the 10,000 meters and was running 75 miles (121 km) to 85 miles (137 km) per week in 2002.

In April 2002, Chris Lundstrom set a new personal best running the 10,000 meter race at the Stanford Invitational track meet with a time of 29:05.9. Turena Johnson-Lane finished in sixth place at the Drake Relays 5,000 meter race with a time of 17:05.03. Katie McGregor finished sixth at the Drake Relays 3000 meter race with a time of 9:29.79. Katie McGregor and Chris Lundstrom competed in the Mt SAC Relays at San Antonio College. McGregor set a new personal best in the 5,000 running a 15:30 and finished in fourth place. Lundstrom also set a new personal best in the 5,000 with a time of 14:10. Matt Gabrielson won the 1500 race at the Jim Duncan Invitational at Drake University with a time of 3:51.2.

In May 2002, Carrie Tollefson won the 1500 meter race at the Minnesota Open women's track meet with a time of 4:17.70. She also ran the 3000 meters with a time of 9:07.79, finishing in second place. Katie McGregor placed second at the Lifetime Fitness 10k (formerly the Perfect 10k) in Minneapolis, Minnesota with a time of 33:36.4, just 0.2 seconds behind the winner. Chris Lundstrom also competed in that race.

=== 2003 ===
Five Team USA Minnesota athletes competed at the USATF Cross-Country Championships in Houston, Texas. Katie McGregor and Sara Wells ran the women's 8 km race, Matt Gabrielson ran the men's 4 km race, and Chris Lundstrom and Mike Wisniewski ran the 12 km race. McGregor and Wells finished fourth and sixth respectively and qualified for the USA national team competing at the IAAF World Cross Country Championships in Lausanne, Switzerland. Gabrielson finished 10th, Wisniewski finished 16th, and Lundstrom finished 19th.

Katie McGregor finished 15th and Sara Wells finished 39th in the IAAF World Cross Country Championships.

Katie McGregor qualified for the USATF Indoor Track & Field Championships in the 3,000 meters, finishing 5th in 8:59.64.

Katie McGregor ran the 3000 meters at the IAAF World Indoor Track & Field Championships in Birmingham, England., finishing 8th in her heat.

Sara Wells was selected to compete on the USA team competing at the World Athletics Half Marathon Championships in Vilamoura, Portugal. She finished 52nd in 1:18:03.

Four Team USA Minnesota runners qualified for the USATF Outdoor Track & Field Championships. Katie McGregor finished 3rd in the 10,000 meters in 31:54.78. Carrie Tollefson finished 7th in the 5,000 meters in 15:36.87. Matt Gabrielson finished 15th in the 5,000 meters in 14:57.79. Toby Henkels finished 5th in his 800 meter semifinal in 1:48.97.

Matt Gabrielson competed in the USATF 8 km championships in New York City.

Sara Wells won the 2003 US Women's Marathon Championship race in Saint Louis, Missouri with a time of 2:35:37. Colleen De Reuck led the race until 25 miles (40 km), when Wells took the lead.

Matt Gabrielson competed in the mile at the Drake Relays and was running with the lead pack when he tripped and fell with about 500 m to go.

Kristen Nicolini and Matt Gabrielson competed in the Capitol Mile in Madison, Wisconsin, finishing in 4:44.51 and 4:13.68 respectively.

Kristen Nicolini and Matt Gabrielson won the State Capitol 5 km, an event in conjunction with the Twin Cities Marathon, finishing with times of 16:49 and 14:25 respectively.

Matt Gabrielson competed in the USATF 10 km Championships in Mobile, Alabama and finished in third place with a time of 28:44.

=== 2004 ===
Eight Team USA Minnesota runners qualified for the 2004 U.S. Olympic Track & Field Trials. Carrie Tollefson won the 1500 meters in 4:08.32. Jenelle Deatherage finished 4th in the 1500 meters in 4:08.71. Tollefson also finished 6th in the 5,000 meters in 15:25.55. Kristen Nicolini finished 12th in the 5,000 meters in 15:53.47. Katie McGregor finished 4th in the 10,000 meters in 32:33.87. Toby Henkels finished 7th in the 800 meter semifinal after posting a 1:47.60 in the prelims. Lyle Weese finished 11th in his heat of the 3,000 meter steeplechase in 8:52.71. Matt Gabrielson finished 9th in his heat of the 5,000 meters in 13:55.43. Jason Lehmkuhle started the 10,000 meters but did not finish due to injury.

Carrie Tollefson competed in the Athens Olympics in the 1500 meters, where she made it to the semifinals.

Jason Lehmkuhle finished 10th in the U.S. Olympic Marathon Trials earlier in the year in 2:16:27. Sara Wells finished 7th in the U.S. Olympic Trials Marathon in 2:33:15.

Katie McGregor finished 5th in the USATF Cross Country Championships 8k, qualifying for the IAAF World Cross Country Championships in Brussels, Belgium, where she finished 27th. Dana Coons finished 18th in the USATF Cross Country Championships 8k. Jenelle Deatherage finished 17th in the USATF Cross Country Championships 4k.

Jason Lehmkuhle finished 5th and Matt Gabrielson finished 8th in the USATF Cross Country Championships.

Five Team USA Minnesota runners qualified for the USATF Indoor Track & Field Championships. Carrie Tollefson finished 2nd in the 3,000 meters in 9:00.93. Katie McGregor finished 4th in the 3,000 meters in 9:11.97. Kristen Nicolini finished 6th in the 3,000 meters in 9:26.02. Nicolini also finished 9th in the 1500 meters in 4:20.96. Jenelle Deatherage finished 4th in the 1500 meters in 4:14.84. Lyle Weese finished 6th in the 3,000 meters in 8:04.92.

Carrie Tollefson & Jenelle Deatherage qualified for the World Athletics Indoor Track & Field Championships in Budapest, Hungary. Tollefson finished 8th in her heat of the 3,000 meters in 9:08.64. Deatherage finished 8th in her heat of the 1500 meters in 4:20.21.

=== 2005 ===
Five Team USA Minnesota runners qualified for the USATF Indoor Track & Field Championships. Jenelle Deatherage finished 4th in the 1500 meters in 4:14.76. Ryan Kleimenhagen finished 4th in the 1500 meters in 3:46.55. Brad Lowery finished 8th in the 1500 meters in 3:47.98. Luke Watson finished 3rd in the 3,000 meters in 7:57.23. Matt Gabrielson finished 4th in the 3,000 meters in 7:58.04.

Six Team USA Minnesota runners qualified for the USATF Outdoor Track & Field Championships. Katie McGregor finished 1st in the 10,000 meters in 31:33.82. Carrie Tollefson finished 5th in the 5,000 meters in 15:24.13. Jenelle Deatherage finished 8th in the 1500 meters in 4:11.02. Andrew Carlson finished 15th in the 5,000 meters in 13:54.83. Luke Watson qualified in the 1500 meters but didn't advance to the final. Ryan Kleimenhagen qualified in the 800 meters but didn't advance to the final.

Katie McGregor qualified for the USA team competing in the World Athletics Championships in Helsinki, Finland. She finished 14th in the 10,000 meters in 31:21.20.

Katie McGregor & Carrie Tollefson finished 1st & 3rd in the USATF Women's 10k Championships, with times of 32:25 & 33:00 respectively.

Jason Lehmkuhle finished 5th and Matt Gabrielson finished 8th in the USATF cross country championships 12k race. Gabrielson came back to finish 9th on the 4k race, with Luke Watson finishing 10th. Katie McGregor finished 5th in the 8k race.

Katie McGregor, Matt Gabrielson and Jason Lehmkuhle qualified for the USA team competing in the World Athletics Cross Country Championships in Saint-Galmier, France. McGregor finished 29th in the women's 8k. Gabrielson finished 79th and Lehmkuhle finished 80th in the men's 12k.

Jason Lehmkuhle was selected for the USA team competing in the World Athletics Half Marathon Championships in Edmonton, Canada. He finished 33rd in 1:04:58.

Chad Johnson finished 5th in the Rock 'n' Roll Arizona Marathon in 2:16:57.

=== 2006 ===
Ten Team USA Minnesota runners qualified for the USATF Outdoor Track & Field Championships. Carrie Tollefson finished 4th in the 5,000 meters in 15:12.23 and 4th in the 1500 meters in 4:12.23. Katie McGregor finished 4th in the 10,000 meters in 32:49.62. Jason Lehmkuhle finished 5th in the 10,000 meters in 28:44.14. Andrew Carlson finished 7th in the 5,000 meters in 13:40.06. Luke Watson finished 7th in the 3,000 meter steeplechase in 8:36.12. Jenelle Deatherage finished 8th in the 1500 meters in 4:13.71. Kristen Nicolini finished 11th in the 5,000 meters in 15:57.20. Matt Gabrielson finished 14th in the 5,000 meters in 13:55.19. Annie Bersagel finished 12th in the 10,000 meters in 34:35.28. Ryan Kleimenhagen finished 8th in his prelim of the 1500 meters in 3:48.24.

Carrie Tollefson, Jenelle Deatherage & Ryan Kleimenhagen qualified for the USATF Indoor Track & Field Championships. Tollefson finished first in the 3,000 meters in 9:05.80, Deatherage finished 3rd in the 1500 in 4:11.75 & Kleimnhagen finished 6th in the 1500 in 4:46.44.

Carrie Tollefson qualified for the U.S.A. team competing in the World Athletics Indoor Track & Field Championships in Moscow, Russia. She finished 7th in the 3,000 meters in 8:59.13.

Carrie Tollefson finished 1st in the USATF Cross Country Championships 4k, Katie McGregor finished 5th & Annie Bersagel finished 10th in the 8k. In the men's 12k Matt Gabrielson finished 6th, Andrew Carlson finished 12th. Luke Watson finished 6th in the 4k.

Four Team USA Minnesota runners qualified for the U.S.A. Team competing in the World Athletics Cross Country Championships in Fukuoka, Japan. Katie McGregor finished 21st in the women's 8k. After a fall early in the race, Carrie Tollefson finished 34th in the 4k. Luke Watson finished 57th in the men's 4k, Matt Gabrielson was a dnf in the 12k due to injury.

Carrie Tollefson ran the Norwich Union London Grand Prix and finished in seventh place with a time of 8:44. This was a new personal best for Tollefson.

Katie McGregor was fifth in the GE Money Grand Prix in Helsinki, Finland with a time of 31:32.17.

Carrie Tollefson defended her title at the Falmouth Mile, run in conjunction with the Falmouth Road Race, with a time of 4:27.95 which was a new personal record for Tollefson and the fastest mile run by a woman in 2006. After the race, Tollefson said she was concerned after running the first lap in 63 seconds but used her strength from longer races to power through the last 600 metres (660 yd).

Katie McGregor, Jason Lehmkuhle, Andrew Carlson, Chris Lundstrom, and Brad Lowery competed in the Guidant Heart of Summer 10K race held at Lake Nokomis in Minneapolis, Minnesota. McGregor defended her title with a time of 32:37. Lehmkuhle finished second with at time of 29:02, Carlson was third in 29:38, Lundstrom was fourth in 30:07, and Lowery was seventh in 30:38. Lemkuhle's time was the best 10 km time run by a resident of Minnesota.

Ryan Kleimenhagen and Carrie Tollefson won the Victory 5 kilometres (3.1 mi) race in Minneapolis, Minnesota, finishing with times of 15:36 and 16:04 respectively. Matt Gabrielson won the 10 kilometres (6.2 mi) race with a time of 29:50.

Kristen Nicolini won the Great Cow Harbor 10 km race in Long Island, New York with a time of 34:43. Jason Lehmkuhle finished second in the men's race with a time of 29:05.

Carrie Tollefson, Jenelle Deatherage, and Andrew Carlson competed in the USATF 5 km championships in Providence, Rhode Island. Tollefson finished third with a time of 15:51, Deatherage finished fifth with a time of 16:25, and Carlson finished seventh with a time of 14:11.

Jason Lehmkuhle finished in fifth place at the USATF national 20 kilometres (12 mi) championships in New Haven, Connecticut with a time of 59:55. Andrew Carlson finished third and won $2,500 in prize money.

Jason Lehmkuhle and Chris Lundstrom ran the 2006 Twin Cities Marathon. Lundstrom ran a negative split and finished in fourth place with a time of 2:17:34, and won $9,500 in prize money. Lehmkuhle finished in seventh place with a time of 2:19:03. He led the race starting on Hennepin Avenue in Minneapolis, but faded on Summit Avenue in Saint Paul. Before the race, Lehmkuhle was regarded as one of the top three runners in the race.

Katie McGregor and Matt Gabrielson won the Twin Cities 10 Mile with times of 53:51 and 48:54 respectively. McGregor broke her own course record she set in 2003.

Katie McGregor defended her women's 10 kilometres (6.2 mi) title at the Boston's Tufts Health Plan 10K for Women championship race. She finished with a time of 32:38, and held off Kara Goucher and Amy Rudolph.

Andrew Carlson competed on the USA national team in the IAAF World Road Running Championships in Debrecen, Hungary, finishing the 20 kilometres (12 mi) race in 1:00:12. He finished in 30th place and was the second American finisher.

Katie McGregor ran her marathon debut at the 2006 New York City Marathon and was mentioned as being a potential winner before the race. She finished in 10th place with a time of 2:31:14.

As of 2006, four Team USA Minnesota runners were coaching high school athletes. Matt Gabrielson, Jason Lehmkuhle, and Kristen Nicolini were assistant cross country and track coaches at Edina High School. Chris Lundstrom was the head coach of the Como Park High School cross country and Nordic ski teams.

=== 2007 ===
Six Team USA Minnesota runners qualified for the USATF Outdoor Track & Field Championships. Katie McGregor finished 3rd in the 10,000 meters in 32:44.69. Mandi Zemba finished 8th in the 5,000 meters in 16:06.02. Jenelle Deatherage finished 8th in the 1500 meters in 4:12.49. Matt Gabrielson finished 13th in the 5,000 meters in 13:53.17. Andrew Carlson finished 16th in the 5,000 meters in 13:55.22. Luke Watson ran 8:55.89 in the 3,000 meter Steeplechase but didn't make the final.

Katie McGregor qualified for the USA team competing in the World Athletics Championships in Osaka, Japan. She finished 12th in the 10,000 meters in 32:44.76.

Luke Watson and Ryan Kleimenhagen qualified for the USATF indoor Track & Field Championships. Watson finished 5th in the 3,000 meters in 7:58.33, Kleimenhagen finished 8th in the Nike in 4:13.56.

Katie McGregor finished 7th in the USATF Cross Country Championships 8k in Boulder, Colorado. Jason Lehmkuhle finished 9th, Andrew Carlson finished 11th & Matt Gabrielson finished 12th in the 12k. Gabrielson was the only Team USA Minnesota runner to accept a spot on the USA team competing in the World Athletics Cross Country Championships in Mombasa, Kenya, where he finished 88th out of 165 starters.

Katie McGregor was selected to compete on the USA team competing in the World Athletics Half Marathon Championships in Udine, Italy. She finished 27th in 1:12:01

Kristen Nicolini Lehmkuhle and Jason Lehmkuhle both won the Great Cow Harbor 10 km Run in Northport, New York. Nicolini Lehmkuhle's time was 34:00, while Lehmkuhle's time was 29:06. Both won $3000 in prize money.

Kristen Nicolini Lehmkuhle won the Twin Cities 10 Mile with a time of 56:26, while her husband Jason Lehmkuhle was second in the men's race.

=== 2008 ===
Seven Team USA Minnesota runners qualified for the U.S. Olympic Track & Field Trials. Katie McGregor finished 4th in the 10,000 meters in 32:29.82. Matt Gabrielson finished 8th in the 5,000 meters in 13:38.06. Carrie Tollefson ran the 1500 meters, Emily Brown and Mandi Zemba ran the 5,000 meters, Andrew Carlson ran the 5,000 meters and Luke Watson ran the 3,000 meter steeplechase.

Jason Lehmkuhle finished 5th in the U.S. Olympic Trials Marathon in 2:12:54.

Jenelle Deatherage finished 2nd in the USATF Indoor Track & Field Championships 1500 in 4:17.38. Katie McGregor finished 4th in the USATF Indoor Track & Field Championships 3,000 meters in 9:03.34. Deatherage qualified for the USA team competing in the World Athletics Indoor Championships Valencia, Spain, where she finished 5th in her prelim in 4:14.27.

Andrew Carlson won the USATF 15k Championships at the Gate River Run in 44:12. Matt Gabrielson was 10th in 45:46. Katie McGregor finished 2nd in the women's race in 50:53 & Mandi Zemba was 4th in 52:33.

Emily Brown finished 3rd and Katie McGregor finished 4th in the USATF Cross Country Championships, both qualifying for the USA team competing in the World Athletics Cross Country Championships in Edinburgh, Scotland, where they were the top USA finishers. Brown finished 18th & McGregor finished 22nd out of 100 starters, leading the USA team to a 4th place finish.

Andrew Carlson finished a very close 2nd place to Jorge Torrres in the USATF 8k Championships, with both timed in 22:42.

Katie McGregor ran the women's 8 kilometres (5.0 mi) championships in Central Park, finishing in second place behind Shalane Flanagan with a time of 25:56. Flanagan had stomach cramps from eating a turkey sandwich, but "looked like she was out there for a jog" according to McGregor.

Jason Lehmkuhle was the top USA finisher in the World Athletics Half Marathon Championships in Rio De Janeiro, Brazil finishing 21st in 1:05:17. Kristen Nicolini was also selected for the USA team. She finished 25th in the women's race in 1:15:15.

Matt Gabrielson finished 2nd in the USATF Marathon Championship race at the Twin Cities Marathon in 2:17:38.

Katie McGregor ran the Twin Cities Ten Mile, finishing second behind Kara Goucher with a time of 55:04. McGregor hoped to keep Goucher in sight, but slowed the pace when she was running alone.

=== 2009 ===
Seven Team USA Minnesota runners qualified for the USATF Track & Field Championships. Katie McGregor finished 3rd in the 10,000 meters in 32:08.04. Emily Brown finished 13th in the 5,000 meters in 16:07.84. Meghan Armstrong finished 16th in the 5,000 meters in 16:42.76. Carrie Tollefson didn't finish the 5,000 meters. Patrick Smyth finished 7th on the 10,000 meters in 28:35.70. Josh Moen finished 13th in the 10,000 meters in 28:58.31. Luke Watson finished 14th in the 3,000 meter Steeplechase in 8:57.98.

Katie McGregor and Matt Gabrielson qualified for the USA team competing in the World Athletics Championships in Berlin, Germany. McGregor was 15th in the 10,000 meters in 32:18.49. Gabrielson finished 36th in the marathon in 2:18:41.

Emily Brown finished first in the USATF Cross Country Championships 8k in 26:58.

Meghan Armstrong, Michelle Lilienthal, Josh Moen, Kristen Nicolini Lehmkuhle, and Antonio Vega competed in the US 7 Mile Championships, run at the Bix 7 in Davenport, Iowa. NIcolini Lehmkuhle finished eighth with a time of 38:54, Armstrong was ninth in 39:06, and Lilienthal was 13th in 39:41. Vega was fifth with a time of 33:35, while Moen was sixth with a time of 33:36.

Michelle Lilienthal was the top-seeded woman in the 2009 Twin Cities Marathon.

Joshua Moen finished second in the USA 10 Mile Championships in 47:38, run at the Twin Cities 10 Mile, in a race he described as a "boxing match." Kristen Nicolini finished 5th in the women's division in 55:50.

Patrick Smyth finished second in the Manchester Road Race, having been outkicked in the last 100 metres (110 yd) by Haron Lagat.

=== 2010 ===
Team USA Minnesota took four of the top nine spots in the men's USA Half Marathon Championships. Antonio Vega finished 1st in 1:01:54. Patrick Smyth finished 2nd in 1:02.01, Josh Moen finished 6th in 1:02:53 and Matt Gabrielson finished 9th in 1:03.44, run at the Houston Marathon. Vega said afterward he was surprised to win, saying his strategy was to just hang on to the lead pack and found himself in the lead at 9 miles (14 km).

Antonio Vega & Andrew Carlson were selected for the USA team competing in the World Athletics Half Marathon Championships in Nanning, China. Vega finished 23rd in 1:03:37. Carlson finished 39th in 1:05:38.

Patrick Smyth competed at the New Mexico Track and Field Invitational in the 3,000 m race. He finished second, having been passed in the last 60 metres (66 yd) by Rory Fraser.

Emily Brown, Matthew Gabrielson, Katie McGregor, Patrick Smyth, and Antonio Vega competed at the USA Cross Country Championships in Spokane Valley, Washington. Smyth was second with a time of 34:52, Vega was eighth with a time of 35:41, and Gabrielson was tenth with a time of 35:47 over a 12 km distance. Brown finished in seventh place in 26:55, while McGregor finished in ninth place in 27:08 over an 8 km distance.

Patrick Smyth competed at the IAAF World Cross Country Championships in Bydgoszcz, Poland. He finished in 36th place with a time of 34:51.

Heather Dorniden & Gabriele Anderson qualified for the USATF Indoor Track & Field Championships. Dorniden finished 3rd in the 800 meters in 2:02.33. Anderson finished 10th in the 1500 in 4:36.28.

Michelle Frey, Jason Lehmkuhle, and Antonio Vega competed in the 2010 Boston Marathon. Frey finished in 23rd place with a time of 2:42:38. Lehmkuhle was ninth with a time of 2:12:24, while Vega was 12th with a time of 2:13:47. Lehmkuhle said after the race he wished he had started the race a bit slower.

Katie McGregor won the USA 25 km Championships, run at the River Bank Run in Grand Rapids, Michigan, with a time of 1:26:24.

Five Team USA Minnesota runners qualified for the USATF Outdoor Track & Field Championships. Patrick Smyth finished 3rd in the 10,000 meters in 29:18.13. Josh Moen finished 14th in the 10,000 meters in 29:52.56. Katie McGregor finished 7th in the 10,000 meters in 32:58.62. Meghan Armstrong finished 11th in the 10,000 meters in 33:54.05. Heather Dorniden ran the 800 but didn't make the final.

Heather Dorniden and Gabriele Anderson competed in the Minnesota Mile in Duluth, Minnesota. Dorniden finished in third place with a time of 4:39.40, winning $1000 in prize money. Anderson finished in fourth place with a time of 4:42.20.

Katie McGregor won the USA 10 Mile Championships run at the Twin Cities 10 Mile with a time of 54:21.

Katie McGregor won the USATF 15k Championships at the Gate River Run in 49:51.

Katie McGregor finished 2nd in the USATF Marathon Championships held at the New York City Marathon on a cold, windy day. Her time was 2:31:01. Shalane Flanagan won in 2:28:40.

=== 2011 ===
Katie McGregor competed in the USA Half Marathon Championships in Houston, Texas. She finished in fourth place with a time of 1:12:13.

Gabriele Anderson competed at the Iowa State University Classic track meet in Ames, Iowa. She won the mile with a time of 4:35.17.

Heather Kampf and Gabriele Anderson competed at the US Indoor Track and Field Championships in Albuquerque, New Mexico. Kampf was third in the 800 m race with a time of 2:04.30, while Anderson was third in the mile with a time of 4:36.64.

Andrew Carlson finished 8th in USATF Cross Country Championships, qualifying for the USA team competing in the 2011 World Cross Country Championships in Punta Umbria, Spain. Carlson finished in 65th place with a time of 36:52.

Gabriele Anderson and Heather Kampf competed in the Grand Blue Mile in Des Moines, Iowa. Anderson finished in third place with a time of 4:49, while Kampf finished in fifth place with a time of 4:50.

Gabriele Anderson and Heather Kampf competed in the 1500 m race at the Drake Relays in Des Moines, Iowa. Anderson finished in third place with a time of 4:12.35, while Kampf finished in sixth place with a time of 4:17.68.

Team USA Minnesota men took three of the top five spots in the USA 25 km Championships at the River Bank Run in Grand Rapids, Michigan. Josh Moen finished in second place with a time of 1:16:09.28, while Andrew Carlson finished in third place with a time of 1:16:35.46. Matt Gabrielson finished in fifth place with a time of 1:17:50.11.

Jon Grey won the USATF Club Cross Country Championships 10k in 29:38.

Andrew Carlson was considered a favorite to win the USA 8 km Championships in Carmel, Indiana, however he had to withdraw from the race due to an ankle injury.

Matt Gabrielson and Katie McGregor won the Brian Kraft 5 km road race in Minneapolis, Minnesota. Gabrielson's time was 14:24, while McGregor's time was 16:23.

Katie McGregor won the Garry Bjorklund Half Marathon, run in conjunction with Grandma's Marathon, in Duluth, Minnesota. She won the race with a time of 1:13:18 despite not entering until the middle of race week. McGregor ran most of the race by herself.

Six Team USA Minnesota runners qualified for the USA Outdoor Track and Field Championships in Eugene, Oregon. Gabriele Anderson finished in 11th place in the 1500 meters with a time of 4:17.17. Emily Brown finished 11th in the 10,000 meters in 33:00.74. Megan Hogan was a dnf in the 10,000 meters. Meghan Armstrong finished 15th in the 5,000 meters in 16:12.79. Heather Kampf made the semifinals of the 800 meters in 2:03.54. Jaime Cheever ran the 3,000 meter Steeplechase but didn't make the final.

Gabriele Anderson and Heather Kampf competed in a track meet in Kortrijk, Belgium. Anderson ran the 1500 m and finished in third place with a time of 4:14.54, while Kampf won the 800 m race with a time of 2:03.49.

Katie McGregor won the Heart of Summer 10 km race in Minneapolis, Minnesota.

Katie McGregor won the Minneapolis Half Marathon with a time of 1:15:00.

Andrew Carlson, Jason Lehmkuhle, Katie McGregor, and Meghan Peyton competed in the 20 km championships in New Haven, Connecticut. Lehmkuhle finished in second place with a time of 1:00:36, Carlson was sixth place with a time of 1:02:03. McGregor was third with a time of 1:09:56, while Peyton was seventh with a time of 1:10:28.

Heather Kampf, Gabriele Anderson, and Emily Brown competed in the Minnesota Mile in Duluth, Minnesota. Kampf finished in third place with a time of 4:46.1. Anderson finished in fifth place with a time of 4:49.3, and Brown finished in sixth place with a time of 4:52.6.

Katie McGregor finished in second place at the USA 10 km championships at the Tufts Health Plan 10K for Women with a time of 33:17.

Meghan Armstrong, Andrew Carlson, Matt Gabrielson, and Matt Llano competed in the Manchester Road Race. Armstrong was second with a time of 25:03. Carlson finished in third place with a time of 21:41, Gabrielson was fourth with a time of 21:43, and Llano was 12th with a time of 22:29.

=== 2012 ===
Four Team USA Minnesota runners qualified for the U.S. Olympic Track & Field Trials. Gabriele Anderson finished 4th in the 1500 meters in 4:07.38, Heather Kampf finished 7th in the 800 meters in 2:02.86, Jamie Cheever finished 12th in the 3,000 meter steeplechase in 9:56.51, Katie McGregor finished 18th in the 10,000 meters in 33:11.92.

Andrew Carlson finished 6th in the U.S. Olympic Trials Marathon in 2:11:24. Jason Lehmkuhle finished 18th in 2:14:35.

Katie McGregor finished 11th in the U.S. Olympic Trials Marathon in 2:34.01.

Chris Rombough finished 4th in the USATF Cross Country Championships 12k. Jaime Cheever finished 6th in the women's 8k Championship race.

Heather Kampf won the USATF Road Mile Championship in 4:36.9.

Gabriele Anderson ran the fastest 1,500 m ever run by someone from Minnesota in Lignano, Italy in a time of 4:04.84. Anderson broke a record set by Kara Goucher of 4:05.14.

Heather Kampf and Gabriele Anderson competed in the Minnesota Mile in Duluth, Minnesota. Kampf won with a time of 4:36.5, while Anderson was second with a time of 4:37.5.

Andrew Carlson was slated to run the 2012 New York City Marathon. Carlson was seeded 20th going into the race. However the New York Road Runners canceled the 2012 race as a result of Hurricane Sandy.

=== 2013 ===
Five Team USA Minnesota runners qualified for the USATF Outdoor Track & Field Championships. Jaime Cheever finished 4th in the 3,000 meter steeplechase in 9:53.01. Heather Kampf finished 6th in the 800 meters in 2:00.68. Meghan Peyton finished 17th in the 10,000 meters in 34:51.49. Jonathan Peterson finished 21st in the 10,000 meters in 30:19.74. Gabriele Anderson finished 11th in the 1500 meter semifinal in 4:32.93.

Meghan Peyton finished 7th in the USATF Cross Country Championships.

Gabriele Anderson won the Fools Five road race in Lewiston, Minnesota with a time of 30:25.

Heather Kampf and Gabriele Anderson competed in the USA 1 Mile Road Championships in Des Moines, Iowa. Kampf finished in third place with a time of 4:43.69, while Anderson finished in fifth place with a time of 4:44.80.

Gabriele Anderson competed in 1500 m race at the NYC Grand Prix track meet in New York City. She finished in ninth place with a time of 4:09.02.

Gabriele Anderson competed in the 800 m race at the Prefontaine Classic in Eugene, Oregon. She finished in fifth place with a time of 2:01.38.

Gabriele Anderson competed in the Meeting de Paris track meet in Paris in the 5,000 m race. However, she did not finish.

Gabriele Anderson competed in the Herculis track meet in Fontvieille, Monaco. She was fifth in the 1500 m race with a time of 4:01.48.

Gabriele Anderson competed in the Anniversary Games in London. She finished in second place.

Gabriele Anderson won the Minnesota Mile in Duluth, Minnesota with a course record time of 4:21.3. Heather Kampf finished in second place with a time of 4:27.1.

=== 2014 ===
Gabriele Grunewald ran the 3000 m at the USA Indoor Track & Field Championships and finished first with a time of 9:23:15. Hours after the race, Grunewald was disqualified after Nike coach Alberto Salazar filed a challenge and was found to have made contact with Jordan Hasay during the last lap, which Grunewald said was inadvertent. Hasay dropped the challenge and Grunewald was reinstated as the 3000 m indoor champion. This qualified Grunewald to run at the world indoor championships in Sopot, Poland, where she finished in ninth place with a time of 9:11.76.

Heather Kampf competed at the 2014 IAAF World Indoor Championships in the 1500 m, however she was disqualified for having crossed the inner lane border. Kampf was an alternate, having finished in third place at USA Indoor Track & Field Championships. Mary Cain was unable to compete due to an injured calf muscle.

Heather Kampf won the USA 1 Mile Road Championships in Des Moines, Iowa with a time of 4:43.62. Gabriele Grunewald finished in 12th place with a time of 4:54.91.

Jon Grey finished 10th in the USATF Cross Country Championships, Eric Finan finished 24th & Jon Peterson finished 30th.

Five Team USA Minnesota runners qualified for the USATF Track & Field Championships. Gabriele Grunewald finished 5th in the 1500 meters in 4:09.68. Heather Kampf finished 6th in the 1500 meters in 4:10.60. Jon Peterson finished 8th in the 5,000 meters in 13:39.51. Eric Finan finished 10th in the 5,000 meters in 13:41.33. Meghan Peyton finished 11th in the 10,000 meters in 33:11.63.

=== 2015 ===
Four Team USA Minnesota runners qualified for the USATF Outdoor Track & Field Championships. Heather Kampf finished 7th in the 1500 meters in 4:16.25. Gabriele Grunewald finished 13th in the 1500 meters in 4:29.72. Jonathan Peterson finished 16th in the 5,000 meters in 14:08.78. Meghan Peyton finished 16th in both the 5,000 & 10,000 meter races, running 15:56.75 & 34:21.44 respectively.

Heather Kampf won the USATF Road Mile Championship in 4:45.4.

=== 2016 ===
Three Team USA Minnesota runners qualified for the U.S. Olympic Track & Field Trials. Gabriele Grunewald finished 12th in the 1500 meters in 4:18.73. Heather Kampf finished 5th in her heat of the 1500 meters in 4:14.12. Biya Simbassa finished 11th in his heat of the 5,000 meters in 13:53.56.

Biya Simbassa finished 4th in the Mt. SAC 5,000 meters in 13:37.86, in a tight race in which he was only a second out of first.

Heather Kampf finished 4th in the USATF Indoor Track & Field Championships 1500 meters in 4:11.56. Travis Burkstrand finished 10th in the men's 1500 meters in 3:49.17.

Heather Kampf finished 1st & Gabriele Grunewald finished 3rd in the USATF Road Mile Championship. Their times were 4:34.2 & 4:39.0 respectively. Travis Burkstrand finished 3rd in the men's race in 4:01.4 & Biya Simbassa finished 9th in 4:05.5.

Heather Kampf finished 3rd in the New Balance 5th Avenue Mile in New York in a PR 4:19.8.

Dennis Barker retired as Team USA Minnesota coach at the end of 2016. During his 15 year tenure, he coached an Olympian, 24 U.S. National Champions on the track, road & in cross country, 2 USATF Running Circuit Champions, 30 runners who qualified for U.S. national teams competing in World Athletics Championships & 73 top 3 podium finishers in U.S. National Championships.

=== 2017 ===
Heather Kampf ran the two mile at the USATF Indoor Championships in Albuquerque, New Mexico and finished second with a time of 10:21.80. She also ran the mile and finished in third place with a time of 4:46.06.

Daniel Docherty won the Park Point Five Miler race in Duluth, Minnesota with a time of 24:24, the second fastest time at the event. He chose the race because it was on the Minnesota Distance Running Association's Grand Prix race series.

=== 2018 ===
Breanna Sieracki won the 3000 m race at the Black and Gold Premier in Iowa with a time of 9:35.65.

Breanna Sieracki competed in the Medtronic TC 1 Mile in Minneapolis, Minnesota. She finished in tenth place with a time of 4:57.7.

=== 2019 ===
Breanna Sieracki won the 3000 m steeple chase at the Drake Relays in Des Moines, Iowa with a time of 9:59.33.

Katy Jermann won the Garry Bjorklund Half Marathon, run in conjunction with Grandma's Marathon, in Duluth, Minnesota with a time of 1:10:37.

Heather Kampf, Kevin Lewis, and Joel Reichow competed at the USA Track and Field championships in Des Moines, Iowa. Kampf finished 26th in the 1500 m with a time of 4:25:45, who had been dealing with calf injuries. Kevin Lewis finished in 19th place in the 10,000 m race with a time of 29:42.98. Joel Reichow also competed in the 10,000 m race, but did not finish.

Danny Docherty and Dakotah Lindwurm competed in the Twin Cities Marathon, and finished in third place and second place respectively. Docherty's time was 2:15:55, while Lindwurm's was 2:32:49. Lindwurm led the race from 12 miles (19 km) to 22 miles (35 km) before getting passed by Julia Kohnen Griffey.

=== 2020 ===
On January 1, 2020, Team USA Minnesota changed its name to Minnesota Distance Elite. The change was made at the request of the US Olympic Committee which said the team could no longer use the term "Team USA" as part of its name.

In July 2020, the men's and women's Minnesota Distance Elite teams won the Quad-Cities Times Bix 7 elite team challenge. Katy Jermann won the women's race with a time of 37:48, while Breanna Sieracki finished second with a time of 38:38. Joel Reichow won the men's race with a time of 33:08, while Kevin Lewis finished second with a time of 33:35.

In August 2020, Minnesota Distance Elite placed third in a marathon-distance ekiden relay race with a time of 2:12:51 held in Michigan.

In December 2020, five Minnesota Distance Elite athletes competed in the Marathon Project in Chandler, Arizona. Participating runners included Dakotah Lindwurm, Danny Docherty, Tyler Jermann, Kevin Lewis, and Joel Reichow. Lindwurm's time was 2:30:38.

=== 2021 ===
Heather Kampf competed in the 1500 meters at the 2020 US Olympic track and field trials. She ran a time of 4:13.76 and finished in fourth place in her heat, however she did not manage to advance beyond the semifinals.

Dakotah Lindwurm won the 2021 Grandma's Marathon in Duluth, Minnesota with a time of 2:29:04.

Dakotah Lindwurm was the third American finisher at the 2021 Boston Marathon, finishing with a time of 2:31:04.

=== 2022 ===
Dakotah Lindwurm won the 2022 Grandma's Marathon in Duluth, Minnesota with a time of 2:25:01. Joel Reichow ran the Garry Bjorklund Half Marathon and finished in 10th place with a time of 1:04:39.

Annie Frisbie competed in the USATF 10 km Championships, run at the Great Cow Harbor Race in Northport, New York. She finished in third place with a time of 31:58.

Annie Frisbie competed in the USA 10 Mile Championships, run at the Twin Cities 10 Mile (in conjunction with the Twin Cities Marathon). She finished in second place with a time of 52:10 behind Fiona O'Keeffe.

=== 2023 ===
Annie Frisbie and Dakotah Lindwurm competed at the 2023 Boston Marathon, where they finished in 20th and 27th place respectively.

Dakotah Lindwurm and Breanna Sieracki competed at Grandma's Marathon in Duluth, Minnesota. Lindwurm finished in second place behind Lauren Hagans with a time of 2:26:56, while Sieracki finished in tenth place with a time of 2:33:26.

Emi Trost competed at the Ryan Shay Mile in Charlevoix, Michigan.

Annie Frisbie competed at the USATF National 8 km Championships, where she finished in 5th place with a time of 26:24.

Annie Frisbie ran the 2023 Berlin Marathon and was the top American finisher with a time of 2:27:02.

Men from Minnesota Distance Elite competed at the USATF National Club Cross Country Club Championships in Tallahassee, Florida, finishing in second place with a total of 103 points.

=== 2024 ===
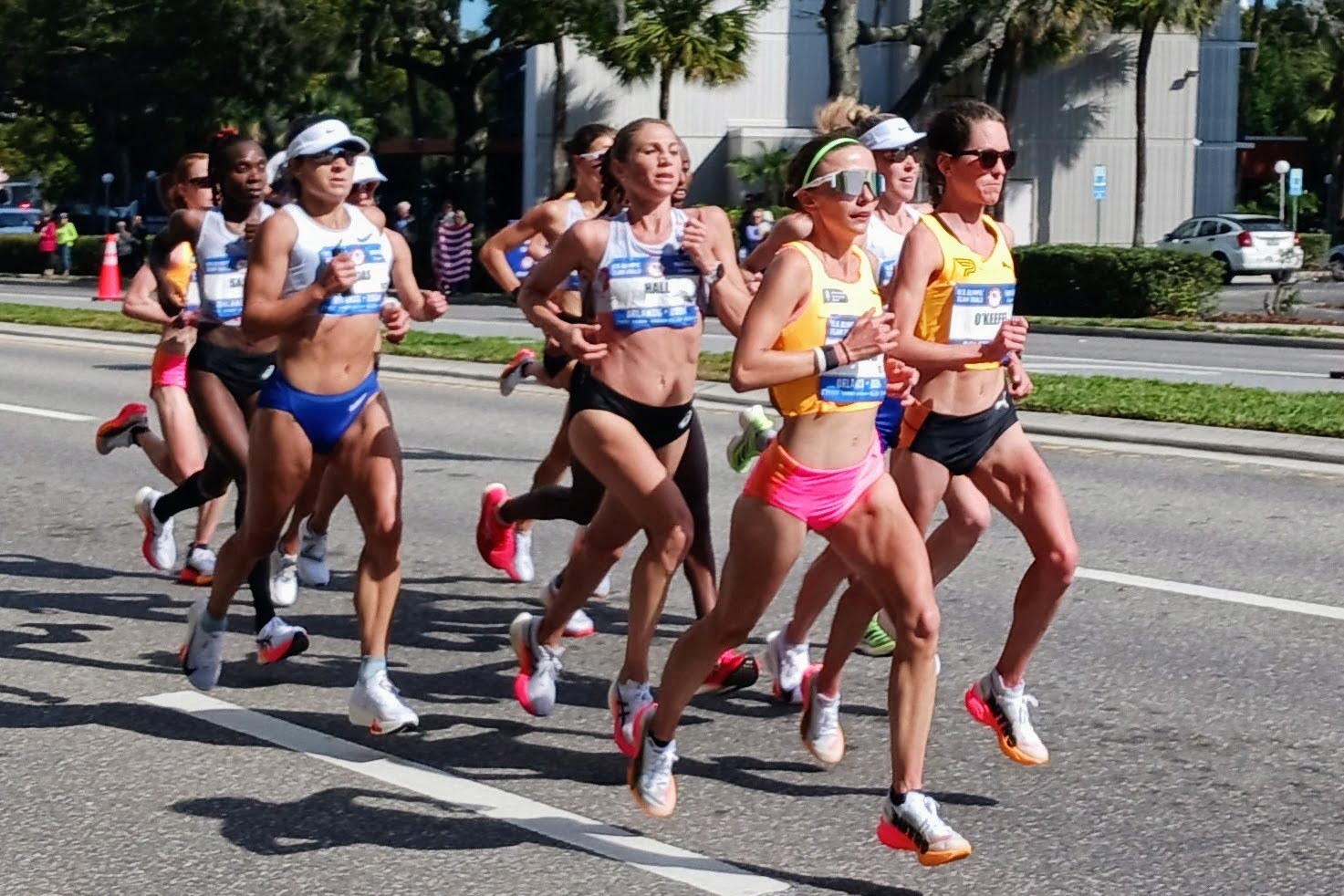
Minnesota Distance Elite runners Dakotah Lindwurm and Annie Frisbie at the US Olympic marathon trials in Orlando, Florida

Dakotah Lindwurm, Annie Frisbie, Breanna Sieracki, Joel Reichow, Kevin Lewis, Tyler Jermann, and JP Trojan competed in the 2024 US Olympic marathon trials. Lindwurm finished in third place with a time of 2:25:31, qualifying her to compete at the 2024 Summer Olympics.

Men from Minnesota Distance Elite took part in the Shamrock Shuffle in Chicago, Illinois and finished in second place as a team with a combined time of 1:34:32 over the 8 kilometres (5.0 mi) course.

Annie Frisbie and Dakotah Lindwurm competed in the Garry Bjorklund Half Marathon in Duluth, Minnesota where they finished in first and second place respectively. Frisbie set a new course record with a time of 1:07:33.

Cailee Peterson, Joshua Yeager, and Emi Trost ran the Ryan Shay Mile in Charlevoix, Michigan. Peterson finished in second place with a time of 4:26.5, only 0.2 seconds behind the winner.

Dakotah Lindwurm competed in the 2024 women's Olympic marathon. She finished in 12th place with a time of 2:26:44 on a hilly course.

Annie Frisbie, Joel Reichow, and Nadir Yusuf competed in the USA 20 km Championships at the Faxon Law New Haven Road Race. Frisbie finished in fourth place with a time of 1:07:19. Yusuf finished in 22nd place with a time of 1:02:43, while Reichow finished in 23rd place with a time of 1:02:54.

The 2024 Twin Cities Marathon had a Best of the Midwest Invitational as a race-within-a-race. Kevin Lewis of Minnesota Distance Elite was one of the invited athletes. Lewis finished with a time of 2:24:55, placing eighth in the invitational and 16th overall.

=== 2025 ===
Clayton Duchatschek, Dana Feyen, Cailie Logue, Joel Reichow, and Titus Winders competed at the 2025 USA Cross Country Championships in Lubbock, Texas. Logue finished in second place with a time of 34:45, while Feyen finished in eighth place with a time of 36:52. Duchatschek finished in sixth place with a time of 30:54, Reichow finished in eighth place with a time of 30:55, and Winders finished in ninth place with a time of 31:17.

Minnesota Distance Elite athletes swept the women's podium at the Garry Bjorklund Half Marathon. Annie Frisbie defended her women's title with a time of 1:09:05, Dakotah Popehn finished in second with a time of 1:09:13, and Elena Hayday placed third with a time of 1:12:22. In addition, Joel Reichow won Grandma's Marathon with a time of 2:11:58.

=== 2026 ===
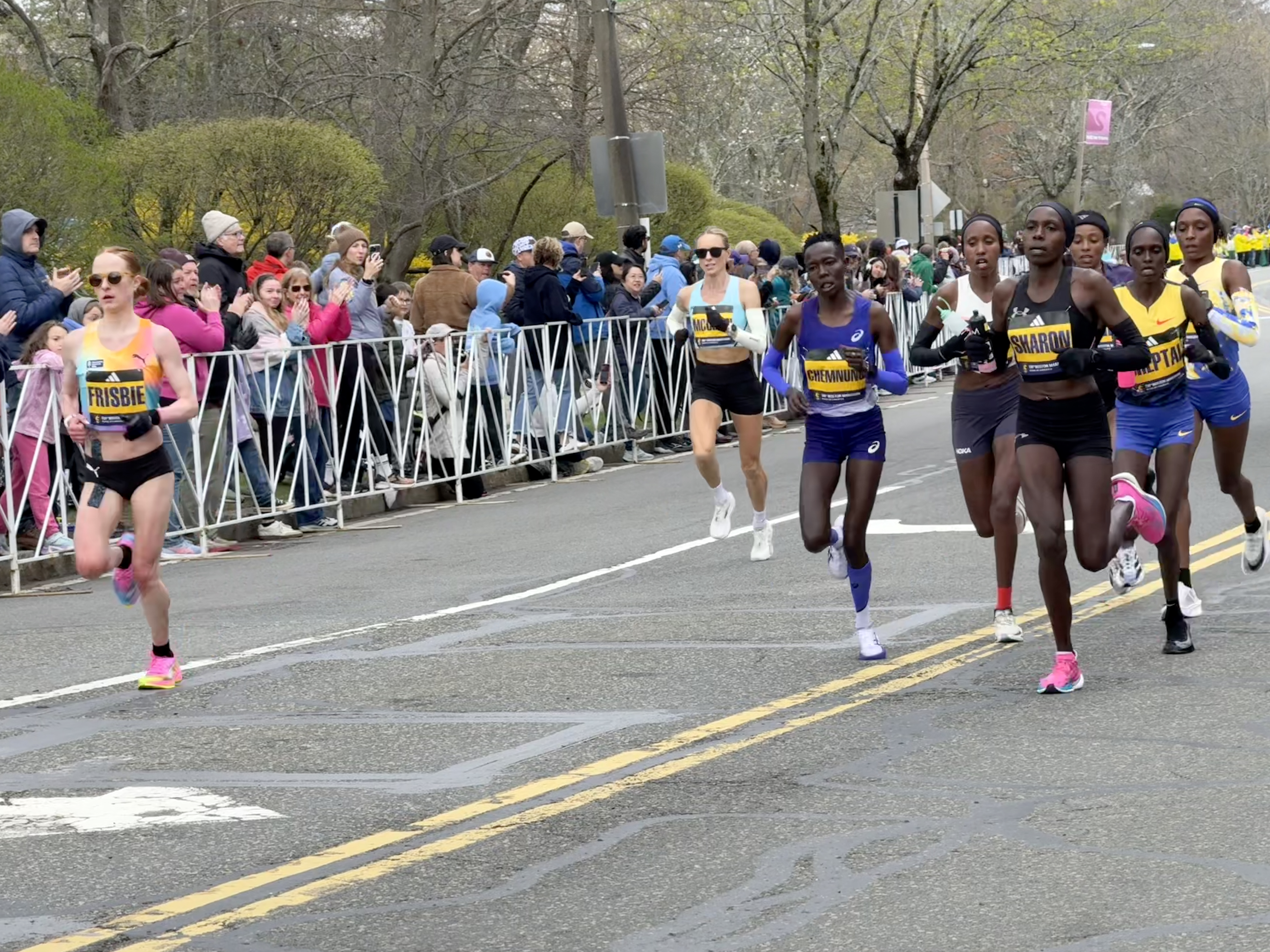
Minnesota Distance Elite runner Annie Frisbie (far left) running the Boston Marathon in 2026

Annie Frisbie, Dakotah Popehn, and Elena Hayday competed in the 130th Boston Marathon. Frisbie set a new Minnesota Distance Elite marathon team record by running the race in 2:22:00, and she finished in 8th place and second American.

== Personnel ==
=== Current athletes ===
As of 18 December 2024

name	joined team	gender
Rachel Anderson	2024	women
Braxton Bruer	2024	men
Clayton Duchatschek	2023	men
Dana Feyen	2024	women
Annie Frisbie	2019	women
Merga Gemeda	2023	men
Elena Hayday	2024	women
Cailie Hughes (nee Logue)	2024	women
Tyler Jermann	2017	men
Kevin Lewis	2017	men
Tanner Maier	2024	men
Joseph Minor	2023	men
Cailee Peterson	2023	women
Dakotah Popehn	2018	women
Joel Reichow	2018	men
Breanna Sieracki	2017	women
Adam Swanson	2024	men
MaKenna Thurston	2024	women
JP Trojan	2023	men
Titus Winders	2023	men
Nadir Yusuf	2024	men

=== Previous athletes ===
name	joined team	left team	gender
Colin Albert	2019	fill in	men
Meghan Windschill (nee Armstrong, previously Peyton)	2008	2021	women
Annie Bersagel	2006	2007	women
Emily Brown	fill in	fill in	women
Andrew Carlson	2005; 2010	2008; 2012	men
Jenelle Deatheridge	2004	fill in	women
Dan Docherty	2017	2021	men
Michelle Lilienthal	fill in	fill in	women
Matt Gabrielson	2001	fill in	men
Emily Gordon	2014	fill in	women
Jonathan Grey	2011	fill in	men
Gabriele Grunewald (nee Anderson)	2010	2019	women
Katy Jermann	fill in	fill in	women
Turena Johnson-Lane	2001	2002	women
Heather Kampf (nee Dorniden)	2009	fill in	women
Kim Kauls	2001	fill in	women
Kurt Keiser	2001	fill in	men
Ryan Kleimenhagen	fill in	fill in	men
Jason Lehmkuhle	2001	fill in	men
Matt Llano	2011	fill in	men
Brad Lowery	2006	fill in	men
Chris Lundstrom	2001	2008	men
Katie McGregor	2001	2012	women
Josh Moen	fill in	fill in	men
Rob Molke	fill in	fill in	men
Kelly Mortenson	2001	fill in	men
Kristen Nicolini Lehmkuhle	2001	fill in	women
Alec Olson	fill in	fill in	men
Dhru Patel	2020	fill in	men
Jonathan Peterson	2012	2018	men
Chris Rombough	2010	fill in	men
Abbabiya Simbassa	fill in	fill in	men
Patrick Smyth	2009	2010	men
Carrie Tollefson	2001	2009	women
Emi Trost	2018	2024	women
Gina Valgoi	2014	fill in	women
Antonio Vega	2007	fill in	men
Luke Watson	2004	2006	men
Lyle Weese	fill in	fill in	men
Sara Wells	2002	fill in	women
Mark Wisniewski	fill in	fill in	men
Joshua Yeager	2021	2024	men

=== Previous coaches and staff ===
name	role	joined team	left team			
Steve Plasencia	men's coach	2001	2002			
Dennis Barker	women's coach	2001	2016	men's coach	2002	2016
Ditlev Larson	assistant men's coach	2001	2001			
Dr. Bill Roberts	team doctor	fill in	fill in			

== Significant achievements ==
Olympians

- Dakotah Popehn, marathon (2024)
- Carrie Tollefson, 1500 m (2004)

National Champions

- Annie Bersagel, half marathon (2006)
- Andrew Carlson, 15 km (2008), 25 km (2010)
- Gabriele Grunewald, 3000 m indoor (2014)
- Heather Kampf, 1 mile road (2012), (2014), (2015), (2016)
- Katie McGregor, 10 km track (2005), 10 km road (2005), (2006), 15 km (2010), 10 mile (2010), 25 km, (2007), (2010)
- Carrie Tollefson, 1500 m (2004), 4 km cross country (2006), 3000 m indoor (2006)
- Antonio Vega, half marathon (2010)
- Sara Wells, marathon (2003)
- Emily Brown, 8 km cross country (2009)
- Meghan Peyton, 20 km (2013)
- Jon Grey, club cross country (2011)
