= Joel Reichow =

American distance runner (born 1993)

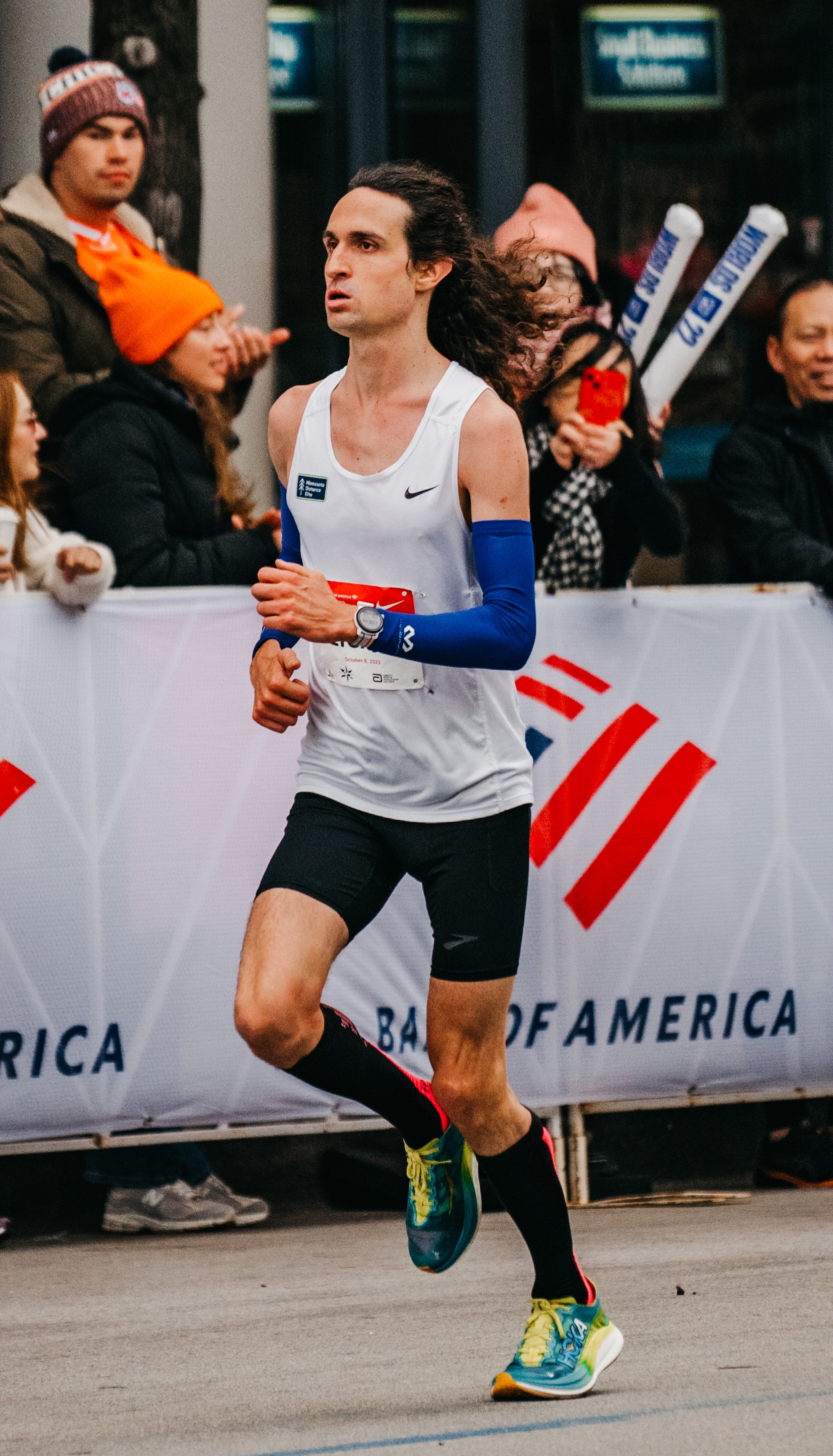

Personal information
- Born: 24 July 1993 (age 33) White Bear Lake, Minnesota, United States

Sport
- Country: United States
- Events: Marathon, half marathon
- College team: South Dakota State University
- Team: Minnesota Distance Elite, Puma

Achievements and titles
- Personal bests: Marathon: 2:09:56; Half Marathon: 1:02:30; 10 miles: 47:22

Joel Reichow is an American distance runner who specializes in the marathon. He was an NCAA All-American at South Dakota State University before progressing to longer road races after college. Reichow competed in the U.S. Olympic Trials marathon in 2020 and 2024, and he was the top American finisher at the 2025 New York City Marathon.

== Early life ==
Reichow grew up in White Bear Lake, Minnesota and attended White Bear Lake High School. He was the state sectionals champion at 1,600 meters on the track and placed as high as fifth in the state for cross country. Reichow enrolled at South Dakota State University where he was coached by former professional runner Rod DeHaven. He was a two-time NCAA All-American in cross country and broke numerous school records, with personal-best times of 13:53 for 5,000 meters and 28:55 for 10,000 meters. Reichow graduated in 2016 with a degree in biology.

== Career ==
=== 2016-2022 ===
After college, Reichow initially focused on track racing. He also represented Team USA at the 2019 NACAC Cross Country Championships, where he placed eighth. Reichow did not achieve national-class results on the roads until moving up in distance to the half marathon in the fall of 2019. His 1:03:24 performance at the Indianapolis Monumental Half Marathon qualified him for the 2020 United States Olympic trials (marathon). Reichow lowered his half marathon best to 1:02:38 at the 2020 Houston Half Marathon.

At the 2020 Olympic Trials Marathon in Atlanta, Reichow placed 56th of 235 men in a time of 2:20:05. It was his first attempt at the marathon distance, and he claimed he was still learning how to fuel properly during the race, which resulted in him choking on his gel pack.

Later in 2020, Reichow lowered his marathon best to 2:15:45 at the Marathon Project event in Arizona. In 2021, he placed 19th at the USA 15 km Championship and eighth at the Cherry Blossom Ten Mile Run.

In the fall of 2022, Reichow recorded two notable results. In September he placed 15th at the USA 20 km Championship. At the California International Marathon in December, Reichow took third in a time of 2:12:11, which qualified him for the 2024 United States Olympic trials (marathon).

=== 2023-Present ===
Reichow placed in the top five at the 2023 USA 25 km Championship. The next month he won the Garry Bjorklund Half Marathon in his home state of Minnesota with a personal-best time of 1:02:30. Later in the year, Reichow lowered his marathon best to 2:10:37 at the Chicago Marathon.

At the 2024 Olympic Trials Marathon in Orlando, Reichow placed 28th of 200 men in a time of 2:16:37. He took 18th place at the New York City Marathon later that year.

In 2025 as a member of the Minnesota Distance Elite team, Reichow won Grandma's Marathon in a time of 2:11:58. In doing so he became the first person to ever win both the marathon and half marathon events at the Grandma's Marathon weekend in Duluth, Minnesota.

His best performance came later in the year when he earned fifth place at the 2025 New York City Marathon in a time of 2:09:56. He was the top American finisher ahead of notable competitors such as Charles Hicks, Joe Klecker, and Hillary Bor.

Reichow placed sixth at the 2026 USA 20K Championship in New Haven, CT.

As of 2024, Reichow lives and trains in St. Paul, Minnesota. He works as a sales associate at Fleet Feet Minneapolis. In January 2026, he signed with Puma.

Reichow finished 16th at the 2026 New York City Marathon in a time of 2:09:43. He was the seventh American finisher.
