= Loice Chemnung =

Kenyan long-distance runner

- Chemnung at the 2026 Boston Marathon

Personal information
- Nationality: Kenyan
- Born: Loice Chemnung; 22 February 1997 (age 29) Kenya
- Occupation: Long-distance runner
- Years active: 2014–present

Sport
- Sport: Athletics
- Events: Marathon, Half marathon, 10 km, 10,000 metres

Achievements and titles
- Personal bests: 10,000 m (track): 30:44.86 (Nairobi 2024); 10 km (road): 29:57 (Paderborn 2024); Half marathon: 1:04:01 (Barcelona 2026); Marathon: 2:18:23 (Chicago 2025)
Medal record
Athletics
Representing Kenya
World Marathon Majors
Silver medal – second place	2026 Boston	Marathon
African Games
Bronze medal – third place	2015 Brazzaville	10,000 metres

Loice Chemnung (born 22 February 1997) is a Kenyan long-distance runner who competes in both road and track events. She is the 2025 Kenyan 10,000 m national champion and a former African Games bronze medallist. She has recorded world-class times across the 10 km, half marathon, and marathon distances.

== Career ==
In 2014, Chemnung finished fifth in the 5000 m at the World U20 Championships in Eugene, Oregon. The following year, she won a bronze medal in the 10,000 m at the African Games in Brazzaville.

After transitioning to road racing, she became one of Kenya's emerging distance specialists. In 2024, she ran 29:57 at the Paderborn 10 km and later that year claimed victory at the tRUNsylvania 10K in Brașov. In March 2025, she won the Málaga Half Marathon in 1:05:46, one of the fastest half marathon times by a Kenyan woman that season.

At the national level, Chemnung captured the 10,000 m title at the 2025 Athletics Kenya Championships, winning in rainy conditions in 31:39.09. Earlier that year, she expressed her goal of representing Kenya at the World Championships in Tokyo.

Chemnung made her marathon debut at the 2025 Chicago Marathon, a World Athletics Platinum Label event, finishing fourth in 2:18:23 — the fastest debut by a Kenyan woman that year.

== Achievements ==
Year	Race	Place	Position	Time
2014	World U20 Championships	Eugene	5th (5000 m)	15:47.33
2015	African Games	Brazzaville	3rd (10,000 m)	32:52.51
2024	tRUNsylvania 10K	Brașov	1st (10 km)	30:13
2025	Athletics Kenya National Championships	Nairobi	1st (10,000 m)	31:39.09
2025	Málaga Half Marathon	Málaga	1st (Half marathon)	1:05:46
2025	Chicago Marathon	Chicago	4th (Marathon)	2:18:23
2026	Boston Marathon	Boston	2nd (Marathon)	2:19:35
