= Tyler Jermann =

American distance runner (born 1992)

Personal information
- Born: August 19, 1992 (age 33) Naperville, Illinois, U.S.

Sport
- Country: United States
- Event(s): Marathon, half marathon
- College team: Iowa State University
- Team: Minnesota Distance Elite

Achievements and titles
- Personal best(s): Marathon: 2:12:40; Half Marathon: 1:02:52

Tyler Jermann is an American distance runner who specializes in the marathon. He competed collegiately for Iowa State University before joining Minnesota Distance Elite to continue his career. Jermann competed in the U.S. Olympic Trials marathon in 2016, 2020, and 2024.

== Early life ==
Jermann grew up in Naperville, Illinois, and attended Naperville Central High School. He placed in the top 10 in the 3,200 meters at the Illinois state track meet as a junior and senior. In college, Jermann ran cross country and track for the Iowa State Cyclones, but he never qualified for an NCAA Championship. His best result was a 24th-place finish at the 2013 Big 12 Cross Country Championship.

== Career ==
Jermann began marathoning immediately after graduating from Iowa State in 2015. He placed 27th at the 2015 Chicago Marathon in a time of 2:22:26. Three months later he lowered his time to 2:18:35 at the 2016 Houston Marathon, which qualified Jermann for the 2016 United States Olympic Trials.

At the Olympic Trials, Jermann placed 35th on a hot and sunny day in Los Angeles. He placed in the top 10 at the Grandma's Marathon in Duluth, Minnesota in 2016 and 2017.

Jermann won the 2017 USA 50K Championship in East Islip, New York.

In 2018, Jermann finished seventh at the Houston Marathon in a time of 2:16:39, which qualified him for the 2020 United States Olympic Trials (marathon). He ran even faster at the 2019 Houston Marathon, clocking a time of 2:13:29 for ninth.

Jermann placed fourth at the Grandma's Half Marathon in 2019 in a time of 1:03:31, while his wife, Katy Jermann, won the women's race. In the fall, he took 16th place at the USA 20K Championship and 18th at the New York City Marathon.

In February 2020, Jermann competed in the U.S. Olympic Trials marathon in Atlanta, but he was unable to finish the race. At the end of 2020, Jermann logged his best marathon time of 2:12:40 at the Marathon Project event in Arizona.

Jermann ran 2:14:58 at the 2022 Houston Marathon, which qualified him for the 2024 United States Olympic Trials (marathon). In May he finished sixth at the USA 25km Championship in Grand Rapids, Michigan. Jermann placed in the top 25 at the 2023 Chicago Marathon.

At the 2024 Olympic Trials in Orlando, Jermann ran 2:26:01 to place 121st of 200 men in sunny, hot conditions.

Jermann qualified for his fourth U.S. Olympic Trials by running 2:15:04 at the 2025 California International Marathon.

== Personal life ==
As of 2024, Jermann works as a data scientist and lives in St. Paul, Minnesota, with his wife, Katy Jermann, who is also an elite marathoner.
