= Elena Hayday =

American distance runner (born 1999)

Personal information
- Born: November 1, 1999 (age 26) Bloomington, Minnesota

Sport
- Country: United States
- Events: Marathon, half marathon
- College team: University of Minnesota

Achievements and titles
- Personal bests: Marathon: 2:24:45; Half marathon: 1:10:56

Elena Hayday (born 1999) is an American distance runner, who specializes in the marathon. She competed in the 2024 US Olympic Trials and was the third American finisher at the 2026 Chicago Marathon.

== High school and college ==
Hayday grew up in Bloomington, Minnesota and attended Jefferson High School. There she placed as high as 34th at the Minnesota state cross country meet. She also won multiple state titles on the track as a member of relay teams. Hayday continued running for the University of Minnesota as a walk-on. She ran personal-best times of 17:10 for 5000 meters and 5:21 for the mile, but she never qualified for an NCAA Championship.

== Career ==
Hayday quickly moved up in distance after graduating from college in 2021, placing 26th at the 2021 USA Half Marathon Championship. In 2022, she placed tenth at the Cherry Blossom Ten Mile Run and 20th at the USA 10-Mile Championships.

In 2023, Hayday placed 16th at the Houston Half Marathon (1:11:38) and seventh at the Grandma's Marathon (2:30:51). Both of these results qualified her for the 2024 United States Olympic Trials (marathon). She was unable to finish the 2024 Olympic Trials race. Later in the year, she finished sixth at Grandma's Marathon and tenth at the Twin Cities 10-Mile.

In 2025, Hayday took 12th at both the USA 20K Championship and the New York City Marathon. She began 2026 by winning the Terrier Invitational 5000 meters at Boston University in a time of 15:30.

Hayday improved her marathon best to 2:24:45 at the 2026 Boston Marathon, which placed 13th overall and sixth among Americans.

In September, she was the runner-up at the 2026 USA 20K Championship behind Rachael Rudel. Hayday was regarded as one of the top American contenders at the 2026 Chicago Marathon. She ran 2:24:57 to finish 13th overall and third for Americans behind Emma Grace Hurley and Dakotah Popehn.

== Personal ==
Hayday lives in Minnesota. In addition to running, she is a graduate student in neuroscience and a researcher for the National Institutes of Health.
