= Carlos and Mia Sanchez =

Boston Marathon Grandparent-Grandchild Duo

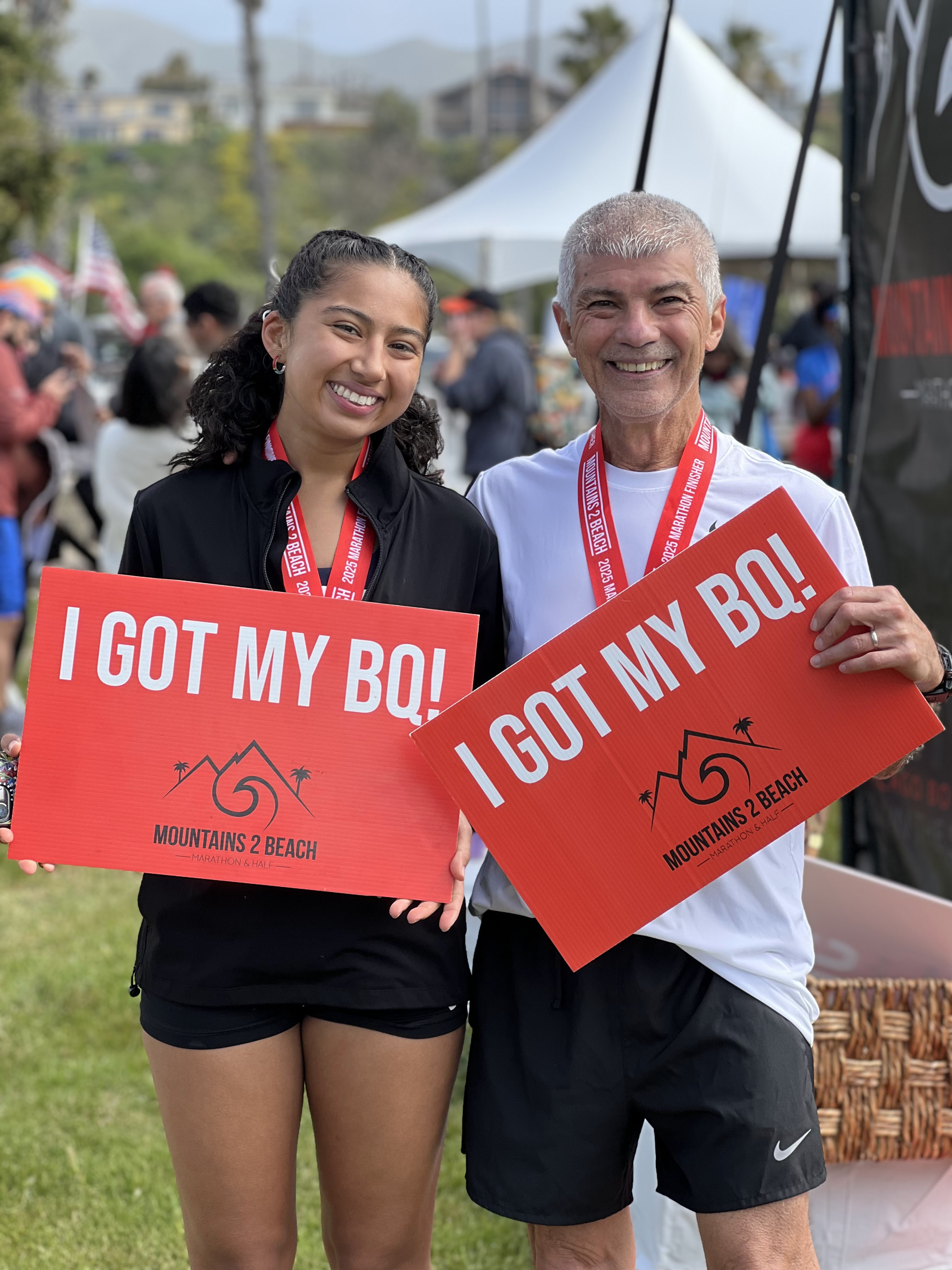
- Mia and Carlos Sanchez after qualifying for the Boston Marathon
- Born: Mia: May 3, 2002; Carlos: October 18, 1958
- Education: Mia: Harvard T.H. Chan School of Public Health; Mia: St. Edward's University
- Known for: First documented grandfather-granddaughter duo to time-qualify for and complete the Boston Marathon in the same year.

Notes
- Marathon Personal Records; Mia: 2025 M2B Marathon 3:14:26; Carlos: 2025 Juneau Marathon 3:50:19

Carlos Sanchez (born October 18, 1958) and Mia Sanchez (born May 3, 2002) are American amateur marathon runners. In April 2026, they became the first documented grandparent-grandchild duo to individually qualify by time for and complete the Boston Marathon in the same year, participating in the 130th running of the event.

Carlos spent 17 years attempting to qualify for Boston, completing 37 marathons before meeting his qualifying standard and gaining entry to the race after the cutoff time adjustment. Mia qualified for Boston on her marathon debut.

Both runners met the Boston Marathon Qualifying Standards on the same day at the 2025 Mountains 2 Beach Marathon in Ventura, California. Their 2026 Boston Marathon finishing times also qualified them for the 2027 race, where they are scheduled to return together for the 131st Boston Marathon.

Media outlets, including WBUR, noted that while the Boston Athletic Association (BAA) did not officially track familial relationships among runners, Carlos and Mia were the first documented grandfather-granddaughter pair to both time-qualify and complete the race.

== Early life and career ==
Carlos Sanchez is a resident of Round Rock, Texas. Professionally, he worked as a computer programmer and system administrator in Central Texas. He began running seriously in 2008 at age 50. Over the next 17 years, he completed 37 marathons, attempting to meet the Boston Athletic Association's qualifying time standards for his age group. During this period, Carlos met the qualifying standard at the 2023 Chevron Houston Marathon, but missed the BAA's adjusted acceptance cutoff time to officially enter the race. He then spent 18 months recovering from injuries sustained in a bicycle crash during the 2023 National Multiple Sclerosis Society MS150 charity ride.

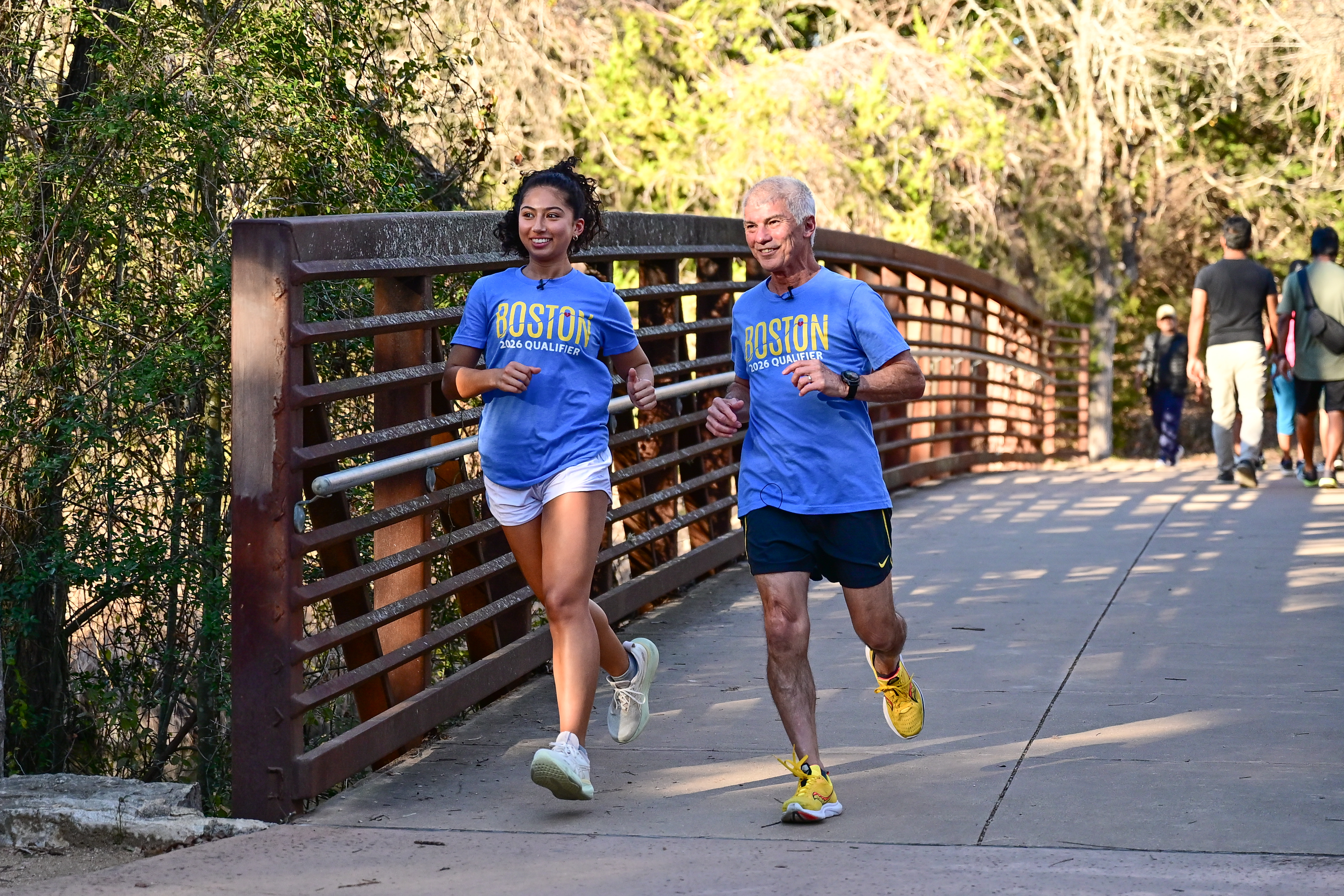
Mia and Carlos Sanchez preparing for the 2026 Boston Marathon

During his recovery, he resolved to "crawl the Boston Marathon" if he was accepted after the adjusted cutoff time. He had achieved a Boston qualifying time in Houston, but his finish time was not enough to get accepted for the 2024 race.

Mia Sanchez grew up in the Austin area and began running in seventh grade, competing in cross-country and track at age 11, inspired by watching Carlos run. She then attended Round Rock High School, where she competed in cross-country and track. A first-generation college student, she went on to compete as an NCAA Division II athlete at St. Edward's University in Austin. She later pursued a Master of Science in environmental health at the Harvard T.H. Chan School of Public Health, focusing her research on climate change and sustainability.

== Boston Marathon ==
=== Qualification ===
The initiative to run the marathon together began in 2025 when Carlos asked Mia to attempt her first marathon at the Mountains 2 Beach Marathon in Ventura, California. Mia completed her debut marathon in a time of 3:14:26, securing a Boston Marathon qualifying (BQ) time on her first attempt. Carlos placed 3rd in his age group and completed the course in 3:50:49, officially meeting his age-group qualifying standard and gaining entry to the race for the first time after 17 years of attempts. Their qualifying performances allowed them to enter the 2026 Boston Marathon as time-qualified runners rather than through charity entries.

=== The 130th Boston Marathon ===
On April 20, 2026, Carlos and Mia Sanchez competed together in the 130th Boston Marathon in Boston, Massachusetts. Mia finished with an official time of 3:14:42, while Carlos finished in 3:54:53.

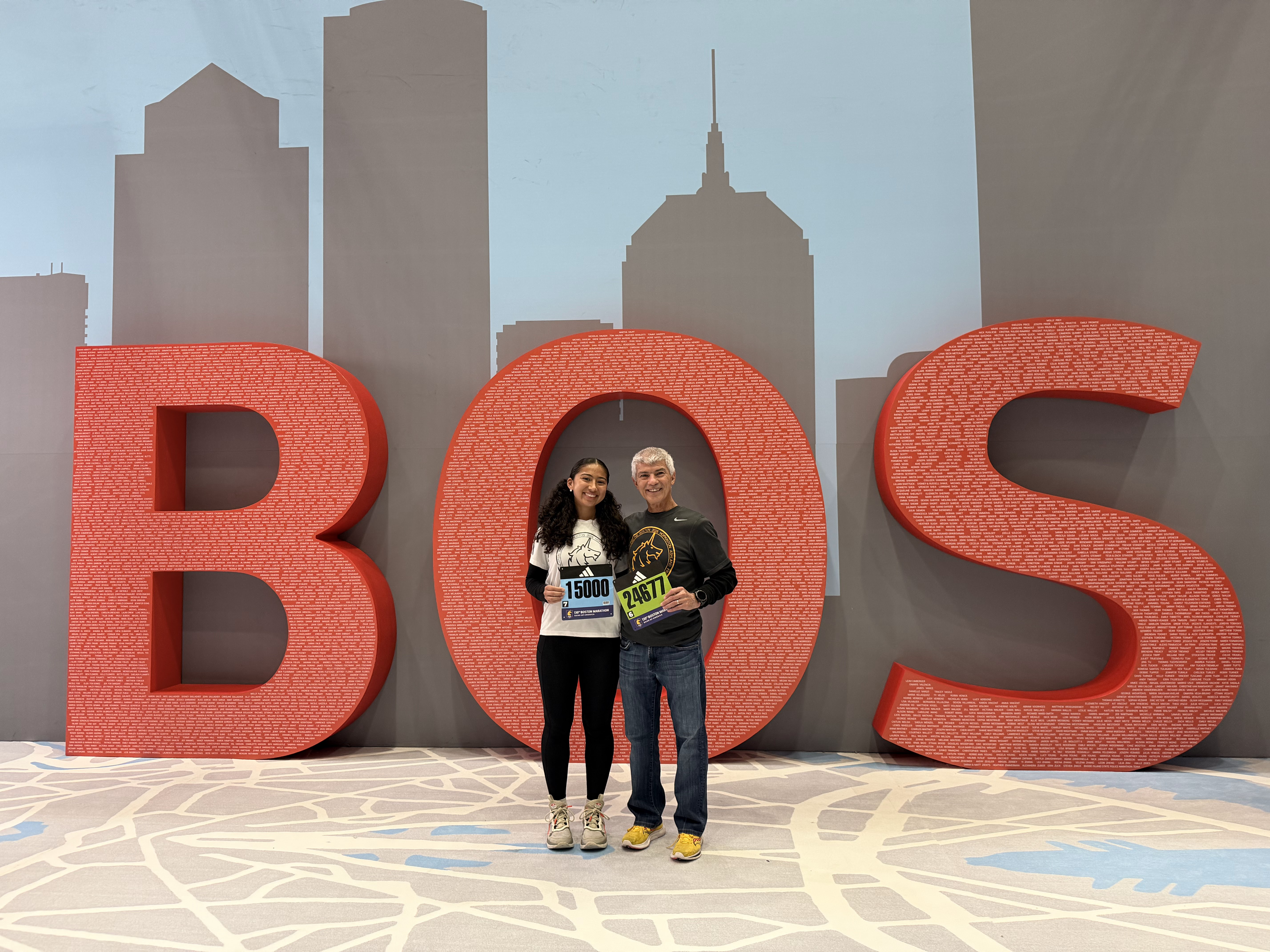
Mia and Carlos at the 2026 Boston Marathon expo

Prior to the race, WBUR reported that the Boston Athletic Association did not officially track familial relationships among runners. WBUR's research found evidence of previous grandparent-grandchild pairs who had run the Boston Marathon through charity programs, but no documented example of a grandfather and granddaughter who had both earned their entries by meeting the race's qualifying standards. The World Marathon Majors has also documented numerous family relationships among Boston Marathon participants, including multi-generational finishes.

Carlos and Mia also appeared on WBUR's Morning Edition to discuss their qualification and what it meant to run the race together. Following the race, WCVB reported Carlos and Mia had become the first grandfather-granddaughter duo to finish the Boston Marathon after qualifying by time. Their finishing times at the 130th Boston Marathon also qualified both runners for the 131st Boston Marathon in 2027, allowing them to return to Boston together for a second consecutive year.

The story received coverage from Texas outlets including KVUE and the Austin American-Statesman, as well as international publications including Canadian Running, Spain's Mundo Deportivo, and Vietnamese publication VnExpress.

== Post-race recognition ==
In May 2026, during the Harvard T.H. Chan School of Public Health Convocation ceremony for the Class of 2026, at Agganis Arena in Boston, former CDC Director Dr. Rochelle Walensky highlighted Mia Sanchez in her keynote address. Walensky described Mia as a first-generation student focused on climate change and sustainability and noted that she had found time during her studies to run the Boston Marathon with her grandfather Carlos.
