= Jessica McClain =

American runner (born 1992)

Jess McClain
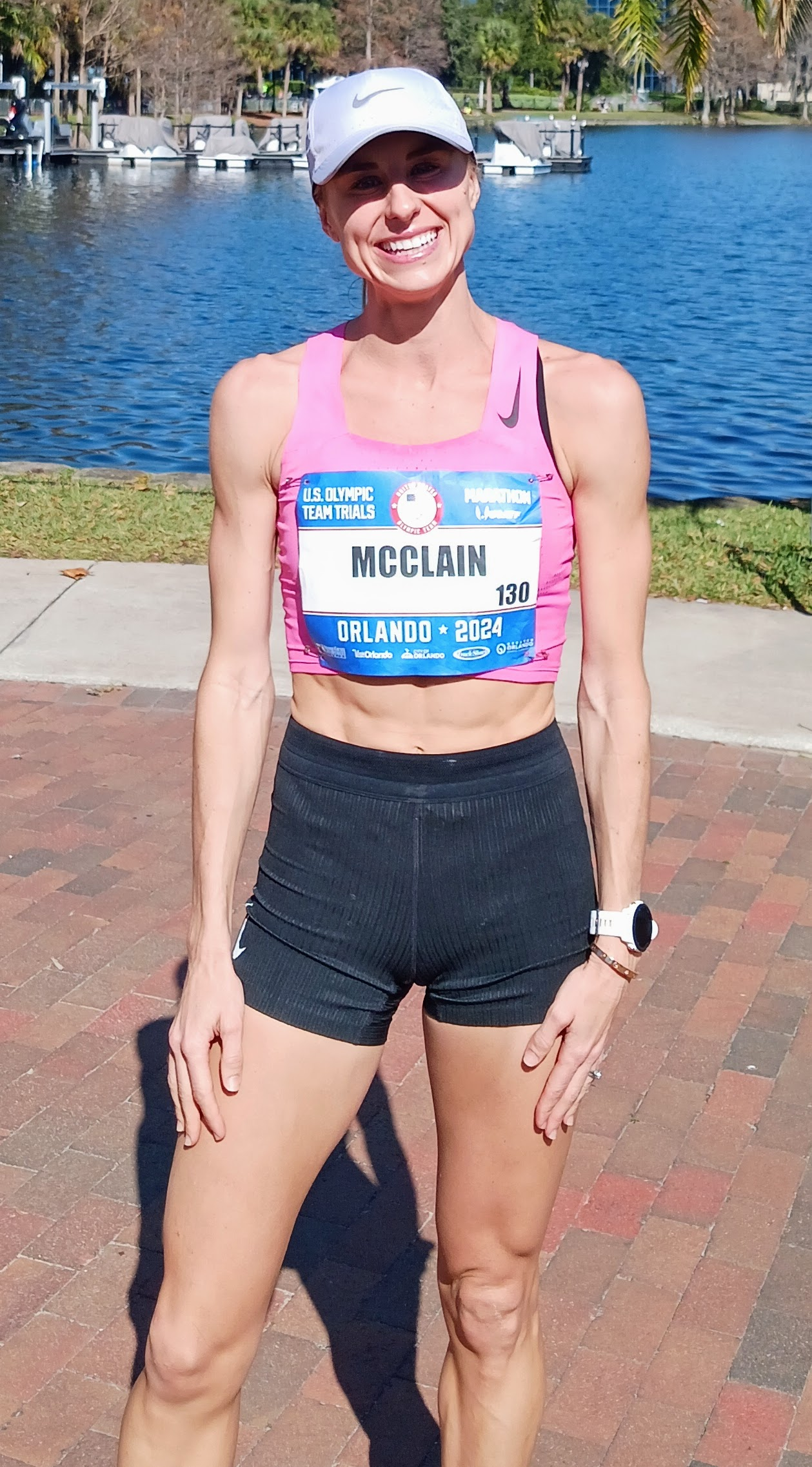
- McClain after placing fourth in the 2024 United States Olympic trials held in Orlando, Florida.

Personal information
- Full name: Jessica McClain
- Nationality: United States
- Born: Jessica Tonn; February 15, 1992 (age 34) Paradise Valley, Arizona, U.S.
- Height: 5 ft 6 in (1.68 m)

Sport
- Sport: Track, long-distance running
- Events: 1500 meters, mile, 5000 meters, 10,000 meters, Half marathon, Marathon
- College team: Stanford
- Club: Brooks
- Turned pro: 2015
- Coached by: David Roche (2025-)

Achievements and titles
- Personal bests: 1500 meters: 4:13.75 (2019); 5000 meters: 15:09.50 (2025); 10,000 meters: 30:59.71 (2025); Half marathon: 1:06:53 (2026); Marathon: 2:20:49 (2026)
Medal record
Women's athletics
Representing United States
World Road Running Championships
Gold medal – first place	2026 Copenhagen	Half marathon team

Jessica McClain (née Tonn born February 15, 1992) is an American middle-distance and long-distance runner. As a Stanford Cardinal, Jess was a seven-time NCAA Division I All-American cross country and Track and field runner.

== High school ==
McClain qualified for four years for Foot Locker Cross Country Championships for Xavier College Preparatory (Arizona). Jessica won 14 individual state titles, two in cross country and 12 in Track and field in Arizona Interscholastic Association.

== NCAA ==
McClain graduated BA and MA from Stanford. Tonn won the 2014 Pac-12 Conference 10,000 meters in 34:09.13 and the same 2015 event in 34:00.33. As a Stanford Cardinal, McClain was a seven-time NCAA Division I All-American.

== Professional ==
McClain signed with Brooks in November 2015. That contract ended in 2018 and she began competing unattached.

McClain ran a 1500m in 4:20.89 at Payton Jordan Invitational at Stanford (USA) 1 May 2016. On 20 May 2016, McClain ran a 5000m in 15:30.34 at Hoka One One held at Occidental College in Los Angeles (USA). She then set a new 1500m PR, 4:16 in Seattle at Brooks PR meet on June 18, 2016.

In May 2018, McClain won the 10,000m in 31:54.83 at Payton Jordan Invitational at Stanford (USA), the year's fastest American 10,000 at that point.

In January 2019, McClain left Seattle and Brooks Beast Track Club to coach Arizona State Sun Devils student-athletes. In November 2019, she placed second at the 2019 Abbott Dash to the Finish Line 5K / USATF 5K Championships in New York, finishing in 15:44, a mere second behind winner Shannon Rowbury.

In March 2024, she announced that she had signed a new contract with Brooks.

In September 2024, she won the USATF women's 10K championship at the Great Cow Harbor race in Northport, N.Y. with a course-record time of 31:40.

In August 2026, McClain was the runner-up to Pamela Kosgei at the ASICS Falmouth Road Race.

=== Marathon running ===
On June 17, 2023, McClain earned a qualifying position for the 2024 United States Olympic trials by running 2:29:25 at Grandma's Marathon in Duluth, Minnesota.

On February 3, 2024, McClain placed fourth in the Olympic Marathon Trials held in Orlando, Florida, with a 2:25:46, a personal best by nearly four minutes. She was the alternate for the Paris Olympics.

On April 21, 2025, McClain finished as the first American and seventh overall at the 2025 Boston Marathon, running a time of 2:22:43.

On March 1, 2026, McClain was leading the U.S. Half Marathon Championships in Atlanta until she followed an errant pace vehicle off course after mile 11. As a result, she finished ninth.

On April 20, 2026, McClain was the first United States finisher at the 2026 Boston Marathon, fifth overall, with a time of 2:20:49 setting a new American women's course record.

In November 2026, McClain ran 2:24:42 at the New York City Marathon to place second overall and first among Americans. Her top-three result was the first for an American woman since Shalane Flanagan in 2018.

Year	Competition	Venue	Position	Event	Notes
Representing the United States
2025	2025 World Athletics Championships	Tokyo, Japan	8th	Marathon	2:29:20
2019	NACAC Cross Country Championships	Port of Spain, Trinidad	3rd	10 km	36:40
Marathons
2026	2026 New York City Marathon	New York City, NY	2nd	Marathon	2:24:42
2026	2026 Boston Marathon	Boston, Massachusetts	5th	Marathon	2:20:49
2025	2025 World Athletics Championships	Tokyo, Japan	8th	Marathon	2:29:20
2025	2025 Boston Marathon	Boston, Massachusetts	7th	Marathon	2:22:43
2024	2024 New York City Marathon	New York City, NY	8th	Marathon	2:27:19
2024	2024 United States Olympic Marathon Trials	Orlando, Florida	4th	Marathon	2:25:46
2023	Grandma's Marathon	Duluth, Minnesota	4th	Marathon	2:29:24
2022	Mesa Marathon	Phoenix, Arizona	1st	Marathon	2:33:34
USA Championships
2025	2025 USA Outdoor Track and Field Championships	Eugene, Oregon	5th	10,000 m	32:03.84
2025	USA Half Marathon Championships	Atlanta, Georgia	4th	21.1 km	1:08:37
2024	2024 United States Olympic trials (track and field)	Eugene, Oregon	4th	10,000 m	32:04.57
2024	USATF Faxon Law New Haven Road Race	New Haven, Connecticut	2nd	20 km	1:06:50
2024	USATF The Great Cow Harbor 10 km Run	Northport, New York	1st	10 km	31:40
2024	2024 United States Olympic Marathon Trials	Orlando, Florida	4th	Marathon	2:25:46
2019	USATF National Cross Country Championships	Tallahassee, Florida	16th	10 km	34:24
2018	USA Outdoor Track and Field Championships	Des Moines, Iowa	11th	10,000 m	32:47.29
2017	USATF Faxon Law New Haven Road Race	New Haven, Connecticut	7th	20 km	68:55
2017	USATF Peachtree Road Race 10 km	Atlanta Georgia	4th	10 km	33:16
2017	USA Outdoor Track and Field Championships	Sacramento, California	12th	5000 m	15:32.34
2016	USA Olympic Trials & Outdoor Track and Field Championships	Eugene, Oregon	DNS	5000 m	
2015	USA Club Cross Country Championships	San Francisco, California	10th	6 km	20:14
2015	USA Outdoor Track and Field Championships	Eugene, Oregon	17th	5000 m	16:02.71
2014	USA Outdoor Track and Field Championships	Sacramento, California	9th	5000 m	15:48.31
