= Annie Frisbie =

American long-distance runner

Personal information
- Born: December 31, 1996 (age 29) River Falls, Wisconsin, United States
- Employer: Puma
- Height: 5 ft 5 in (165 cm)

Sport
- Sport: Long-distance running
- Event(s): Marathon; 5000 metres
- College team: Iowa State Cyclones
- Club: Minnesota Distance Elite
- Turned pro: 2019

Achievements and titles
- Personal best(s): 5000 meters: 15:53.41; Half-Marathon: 1:07:33 Marathon: 2:22:00
Medal record
Women's athletics
Representing the United States

Annie Frisbie is an American long-distance runner sponsored by Puma.

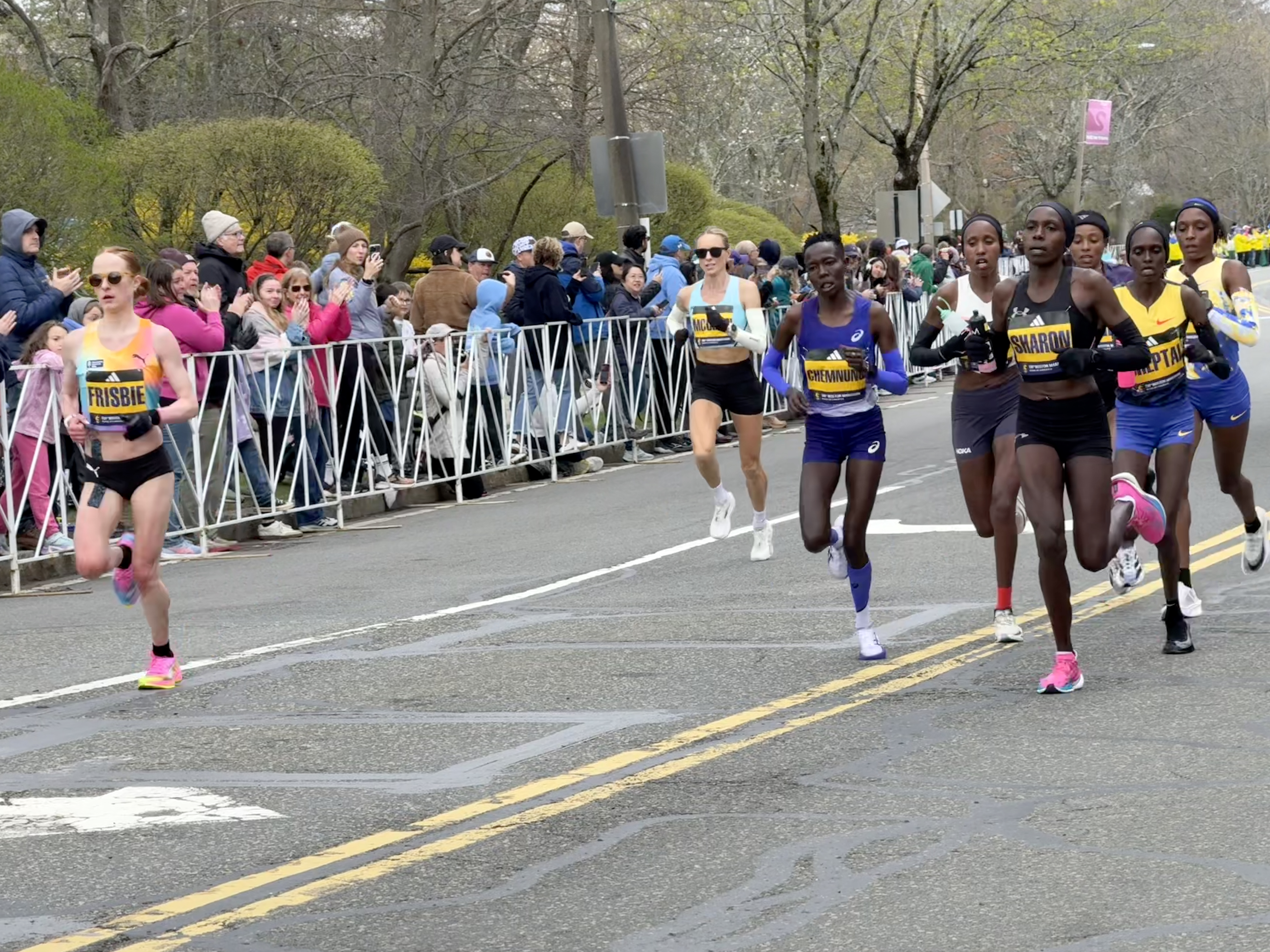
Annie Frisbie (far left) competing in the 2026 Boston Marathon

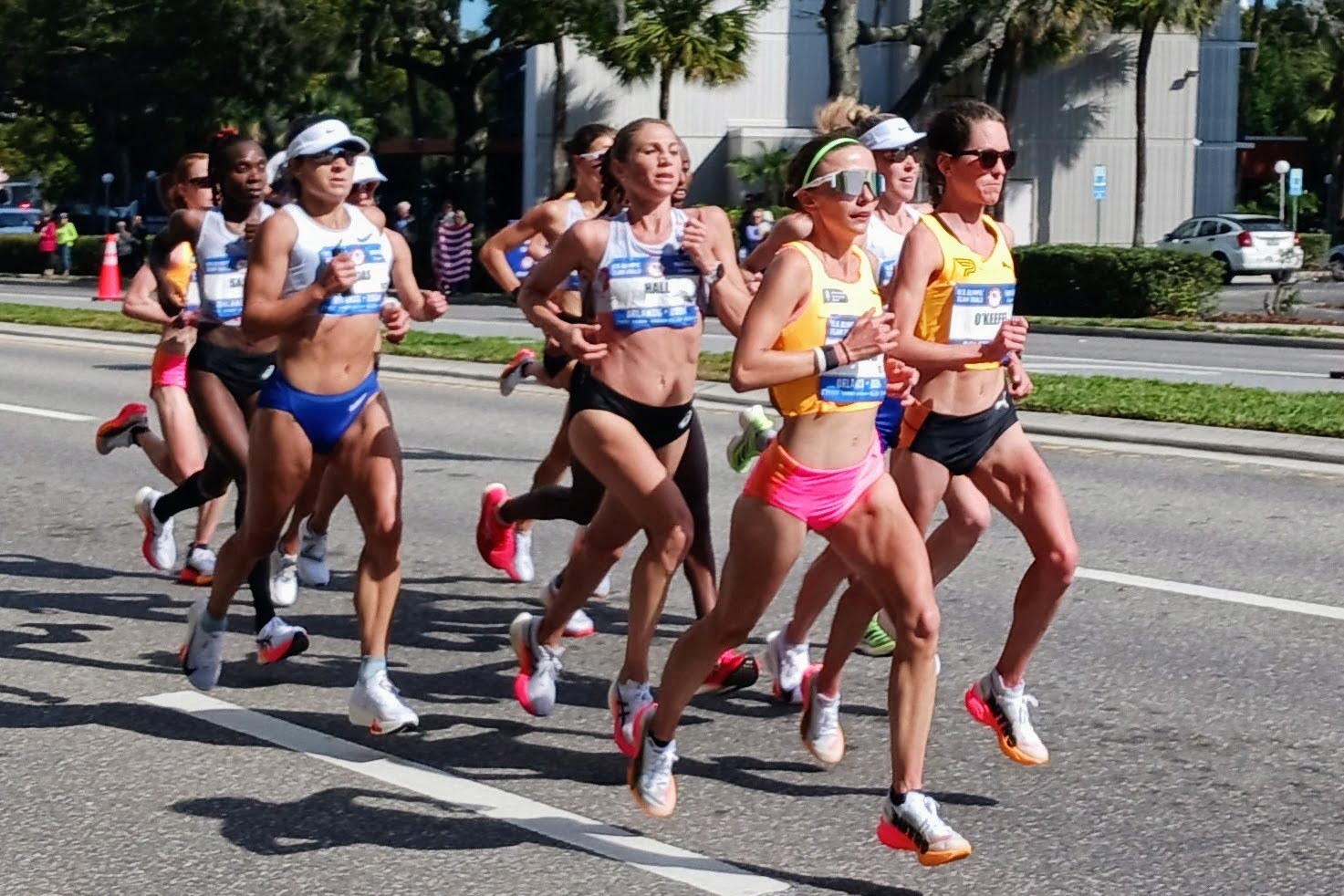
Annie Frisbie (far left) competing in the 2024 US Olympic Marathon Trials.

== High School ==
Frisbie was the Wisconsin large school Cross Country champion at River Falls High School. Frisbie won 2014 won the Wisconsin D1 (large schools) State Cross Country individual title in a time of 17:59.20.

Frisbie placed in the top 25 at the Foot Locker Cross Country Championships and Nike Cross Nationals.

Frisbie finished third at the 2015 Wisconsin D1 State Track & Field Championships in the 1600 meters with a time of 4:59.

== NCAA ==
She competed for the Iowa State Cyclones where she was an All-American in Cross Country.

== Professional career ==
She took bronze at the 2021 US 10k Championships, the Peachtree Road Race.

Frisbie finished 7th at the 2021 New York City Marathon. She led the marathon at the halfway point.

Frisbie joined Minnesota Distance Elite.

In fall 2021, Puma sponsored Frisbie.

Frisbie placed 17th at 2023 Berlin Marathon in 2:27:02. At the 2026 Boston Marathon Frisbie finished 8th place with a new personal record of 2:22:00.

== Achievements ==
Year	Competition	Venue	Position	Event	Notes
2026	Boston Marathon	Hopkinton, Massachusetts to Boston, Massachusetts	8th	Marathon	2:22:00
2025	New York City Marathon	New York, New York	5th	Marathon	2:24:12
2025	2025 USATF Women's 6K Championship	Canton, Ohio	2nd	6k	18:35.26
2025	Garry Bjorklund Half Marathon	Duluth, Minnesota	1st	Half-Marathon	1:09:05
2025	Boston Marathon	Hopkinton, Massachusetts to Boston, Massachusetts	8th	Marathon	2:23:21
2024	Chicago Marathon	Chicago, Illinois	14th	Marathon	2:27:52
2024	Garry Bjorklund Half Marathon	Duluth, Minnesota	1st	Half-Marathon	1:07:33
2024	US Olympic Trials Marathon	Orlando, Florida	10th	Marathon	2:27:56
2023	Berlin Marathon	Berlin, Germany	17th	Marathon	2:27:02
2023	Faxon Law New Haven Road Race	New Haven, Connecticut	5th	20 km	1:07:27
2023	Boston Marathon	Hopkinton, Massachusetts to Boston, Massachusetts	20th	Marathon	2:28:45
2022	Medtronic TC 10 Mile	Minneapolis, Minnesota to Saint Paul, Minnesota	2nd	10 miles	52:10
2022	Peachtree Road Race	Atlanta, Georgia	10th	10 km	32:22
2022	Aramco Houston Half Marathon	Houston, Texas	10th	Half-Marathon	1:10:27
2021	New York City Marathon	New York, New York	7th	Marathon	2:26:18
2021	Cooper River Bridge Run	Mount Pleasant, South Carolina to Charleston, South Carolina	3rd	10 km	31:56
2021	Peachtree Road Race	Atlanta, Georgia	3rd	10 km	32:06
