= 2026 Boston Marathon =

Footrace in Boston, Massachusetts

- Location: Boston, Massachusetts, U.S.
- Date: Monday, April 20, 2026
- Website: https://www.baa.org/races/boston-marathon

Champions
- Men: John Korir (2:01:52)
- Women: Sharon Lokedi (2:18:51)
- Wheelchair men: Marcel Hug (1:16:06)
- Wheelchair women: Eden Rainbow-Cooper (1:30:51)

The 2026 Boston Marathon was the 130th official edition of the annual marathon race in Boston, Massachusetts, held on Monday, April 20, 2026. It was a Platinum Label marathon and the second of seven World Marathon Majors scheduled for 2026 following the 2026 Tokyo Marathon on March 1.

For the 2026 edition, runners who ran 4 minutes and 34 seconds faster than the qualifying time for their gender and age group were accepted to the race, for a total of 24,362 runners. Organizers introduced a newly redesigned medal for race finishers—golden on a blue and gold ribbon—manufactured by the North Attleborough-based company Ashworth Awards.

John Korir ran a course record time of 2:01:52, besting Geoffrey Mutai's prior record of 2:03:02 from 2011. Alphonce Simbu and Benson Kipruto also broke the course record, with second and third place times of 2:02:47 and 2:02:50, respectively. Jess McClain set a new American women's course record with a time of 2:20:49.

== Entrants ==
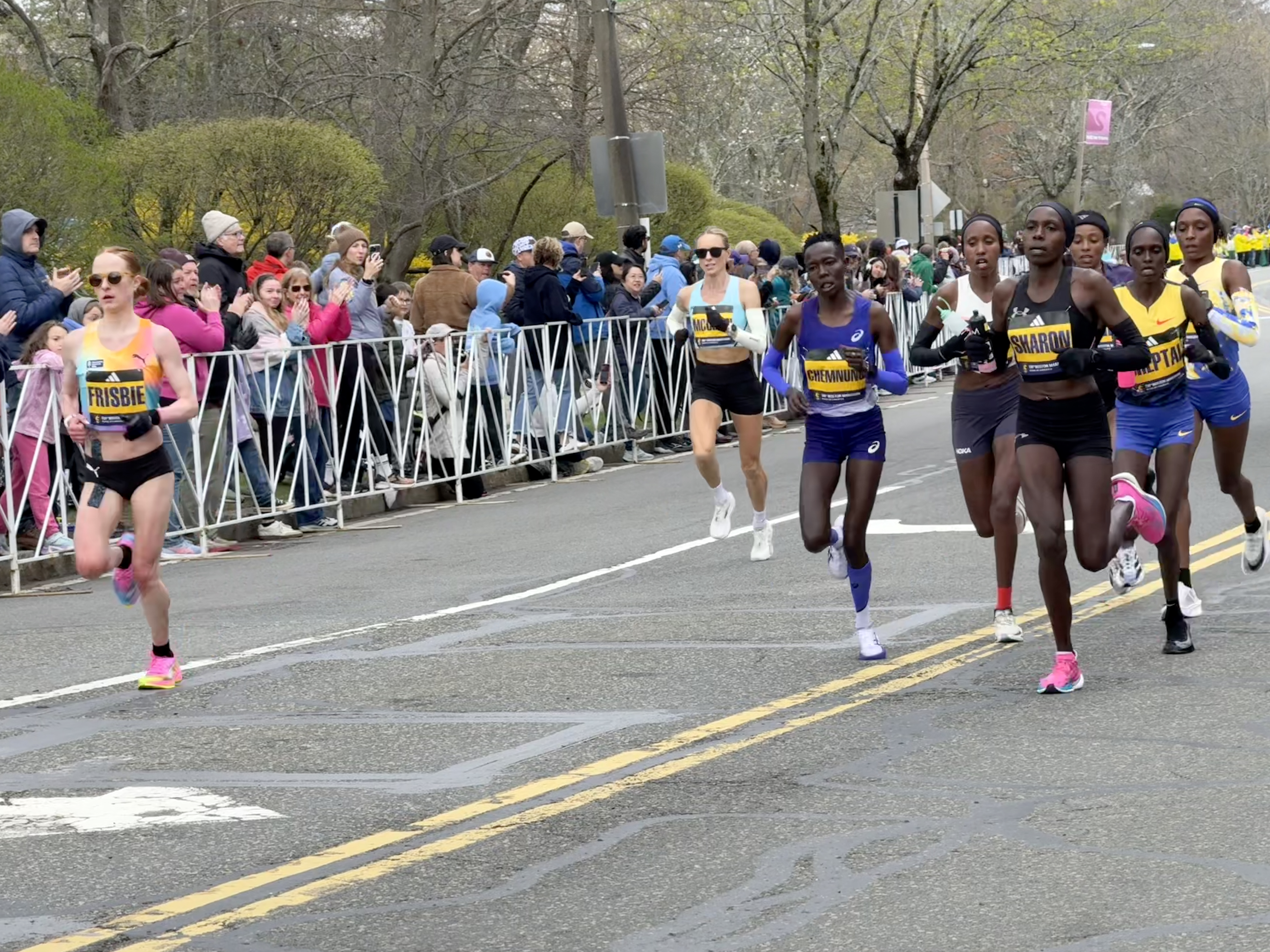
Sharon Lokedi and lead women in 2026 Boston Marathon

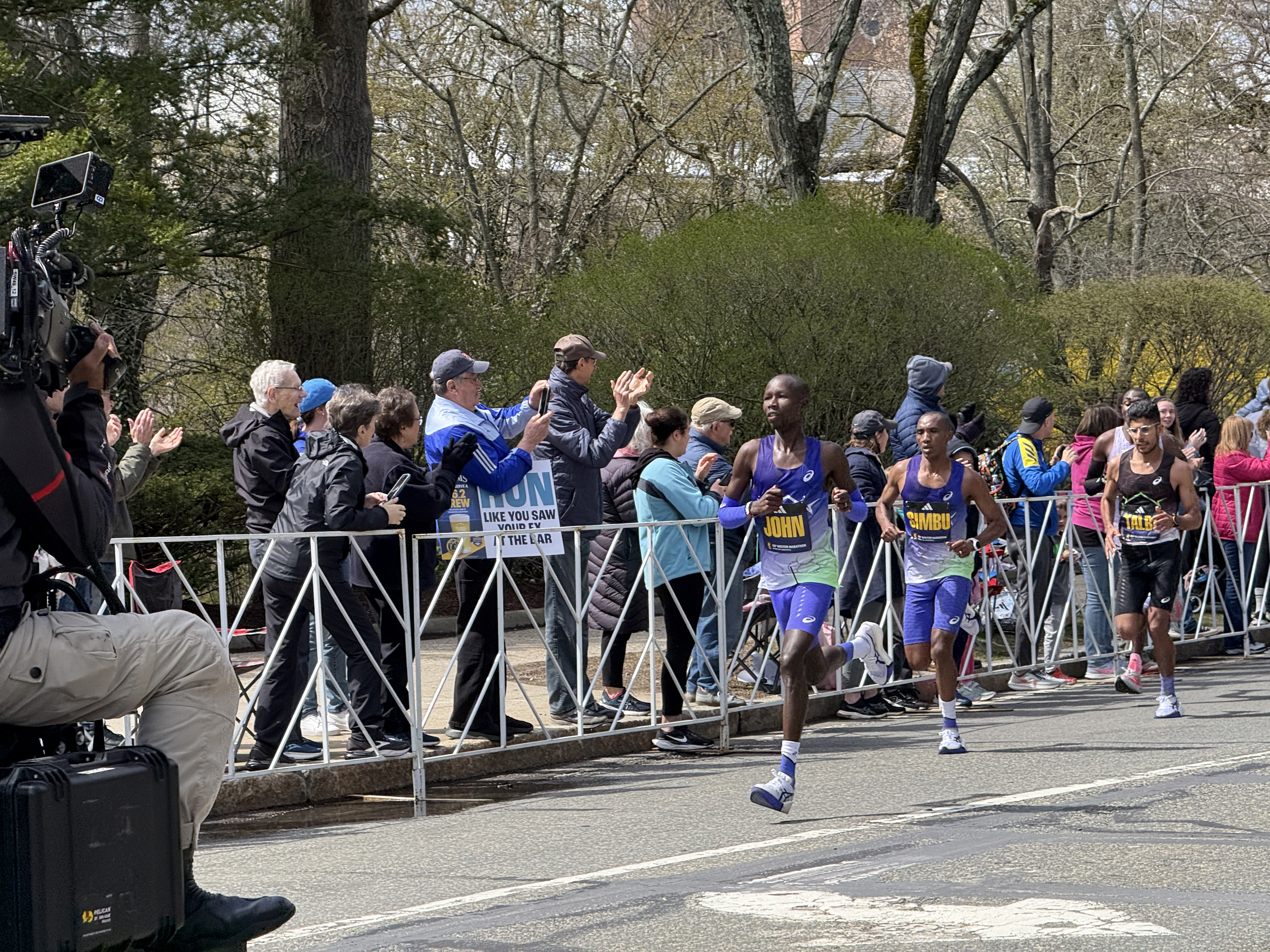
John Korir, Alphonce Simbu and Zouhair Talbi lead the men just past Mile 19

Elite male athletes included John Korir, the 2025 champion, Alphonce Simbu, and Cybrian Kotut. Conner Mantz withdrew in late March. Elite female athletes included Sharon Lokedi, the 2025 champion, Dakotah Popehn, and Emily Sisson. Fiona O'Keeffe withdrew the day before the race.

Other notable participants, as announced by event organizers, included Amby Burfoot (1968 men's champion), Zdeno Chara (former Boston Bruins captain), Chelsea Clinton (former first daughter), Jeff DaRosa (guitarist for the Dropkick Murphys), Chris Herren (former NBA player), Kristine Lilly (former player on the U.S. women's national soccer team), Desiree Linden (2018 women's champion), and Sunita Williams (former astronaut). Each of the aforementioned completed the race.

Carlos and Mia Sanchez became the first documented grandfather-granddaughter duo to qualify for and complete the Boston Marathon in the same year.

== Results ==
=== Open ===
Elite men top finishers
Place	Athlete	Nationality	Time
1st place, gold medalist(s)	John Korir	Kenya	2:01:52
2nd place, silver medalist(s)	Alphonce Simbu	Tanzania	2:02:47
3rd place, bronze medalist(s)	Benson Kipruto	Kenya	2:02:50
4	Hailemaryam Kiros	Ethiopia	2:03:42
5	Zouhair Talbi	United States	2:03:45
6	Tebello Ramakongoana	Lesotho	2:04:18
7	Charles Hicks	United States	2:04:35
8	Richard Ringer	Germany	2:04:47
9	Alex Masai	Kenya	2:05:32
10	Milkesa Mengesha	Ethiopia	2:05:35

John Korir repeated as champion and set a new course record.

Elite women top finishers
Place	Athlete	Nationality	Time
1st place, gold medalist(s)	Sharon Lokedi	Kenya	2:18:51
2nd place, silver medalist(s)	Loice Chemnung	Kenya	2:19:35
3rd place, bronze medalist(s)	Mary Ngugi-Cooper	Kenya	2:20:07
4	Mercy Chelangat	Kenya	2:20:30
5	Jessica McClain	United States	2:20:49
6	Irine Cheptai	Kenya	2:20:54
7	Workenesh Edesa	Ethiopia	2:21:52
8	Annie Frisbie	United States	2:22:00
9	Emily Sisson	United States	2:22:39
10	Carrie Ellwood	United States	2:22:53

Sharon Lokedi repeated as champion.

Jessica McClain set a new course record for American women.
