= Washingtonville Central School District =

School district in the U.S. state of New York

Address
- 52 West Main Street Washintgonville, Orange County, New York, 10992; United States

District information
- Type: Public
- Grades: Pre-K–12
- Established: 1931; 95 years ago
- Superintendent: Larry Washington
- School board: 7 members
- Governing agency: NYSED
- Schools: Washingtonville High School; Washingtonville Middle School; Little Britain Elementary School; Taft Elementary School; Round Hill Elementary School
- NCES District ID: 3630030
- District ID: NY-440102060000

Students and staff
- Students: 3,974
- Teachers: 313.85
- Student–teacher ratio: 12.66
- Athletic conference: NYSPHSAA Section IX
- District mascot: Wizards

Other information
- Website: www.wcsdk12.org

Washingtonville Central School District is a public school district in New York.

== Schools ==
- Washingtonville High School
- Washingtonville Middle School
- Little Britain Elementary School
- Taft Elementary School
- Round Hill Elementary School
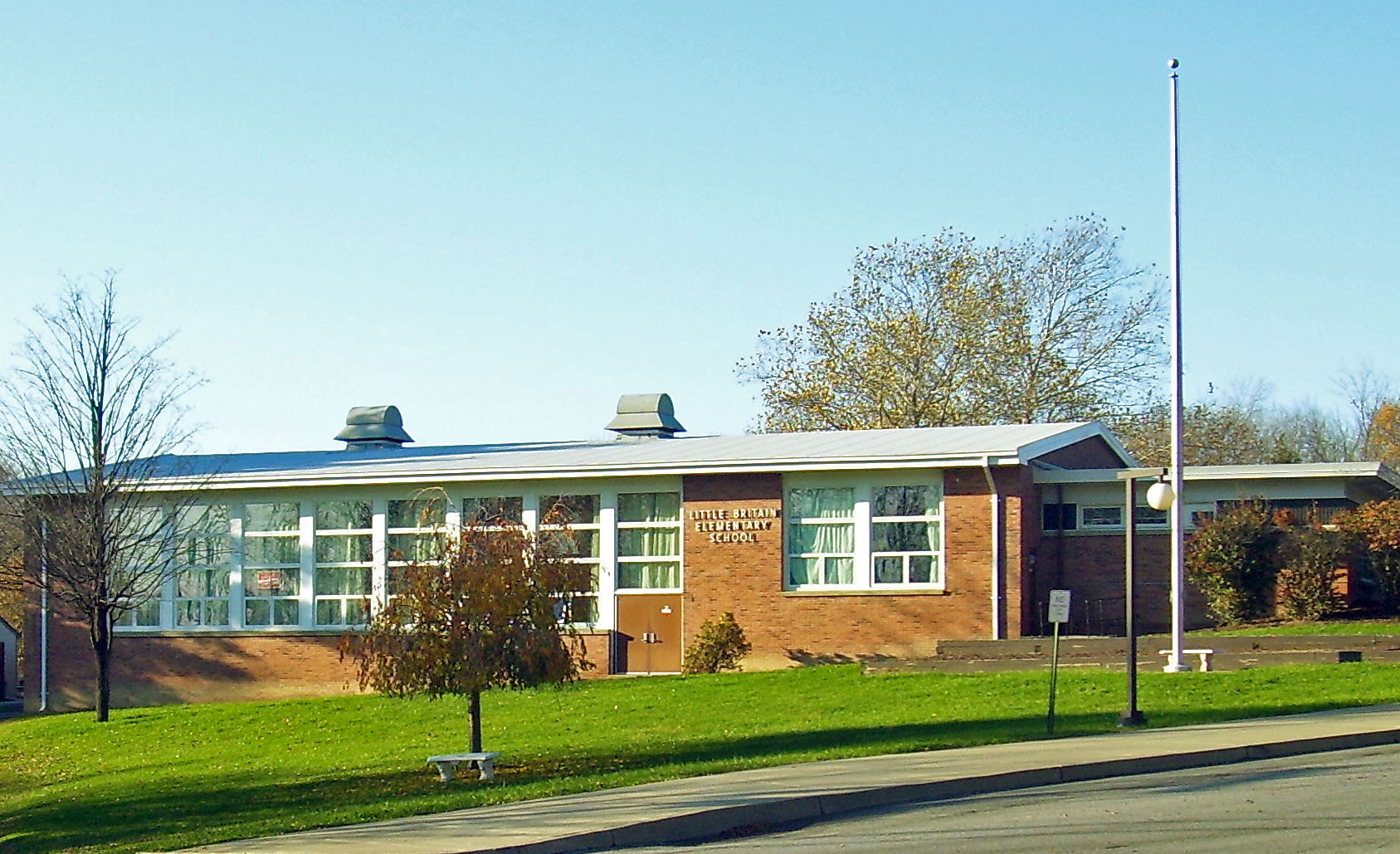
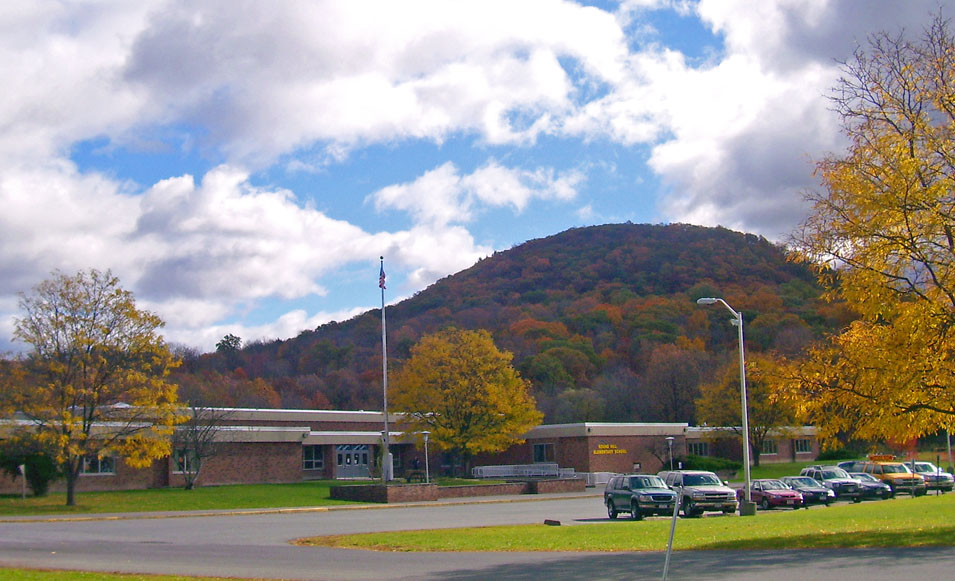
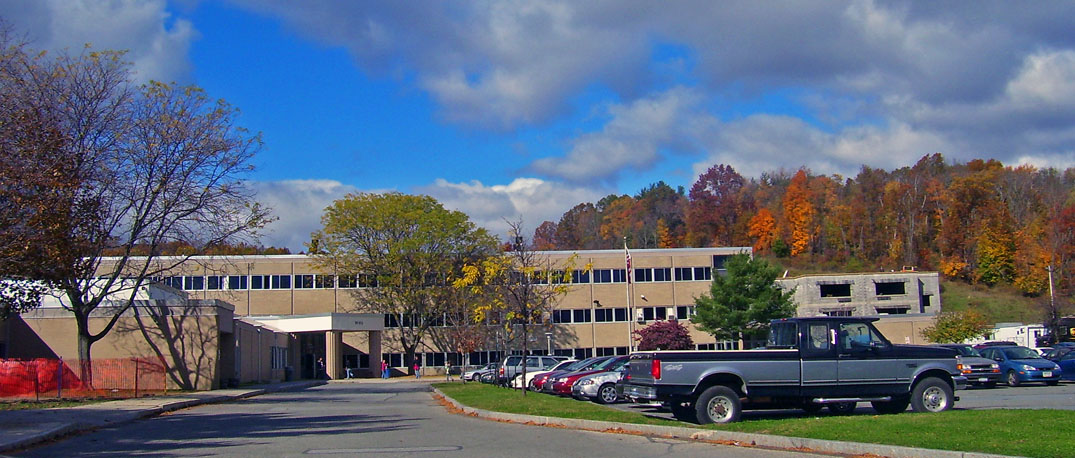
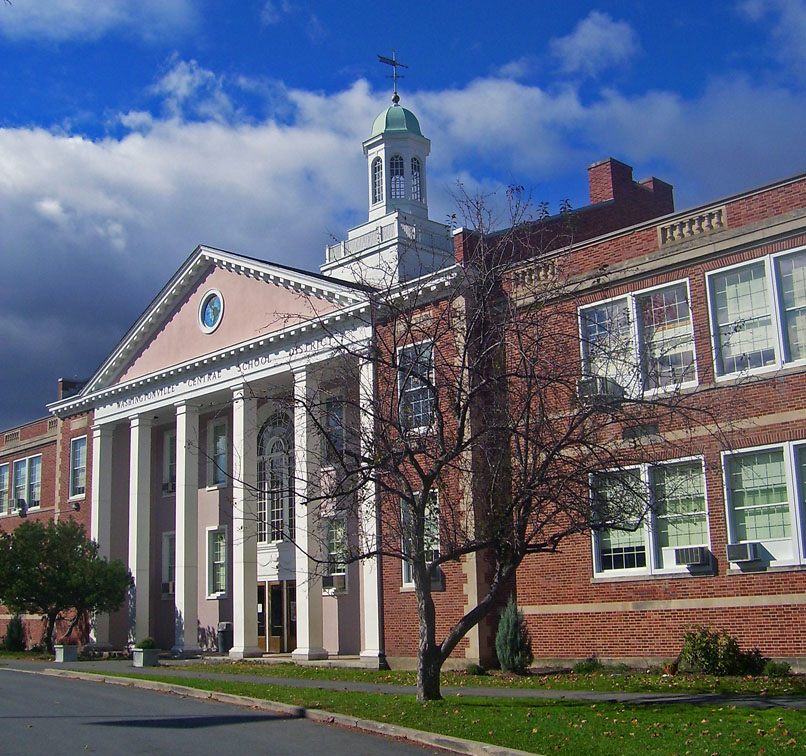
Clockwise from upper left: Little Britain Elementary School, Round Hill Elementary School, Washingtonville Middle School and Washingtonville High School, all pictured in 2006

== History ==
In 1931, Washingtonville became the second school district in Orange County, New York to centralize. Washingtonville Middle School was built on West Main Street between 1931 and 1933 and was originally called the "Washingtonville Central School." The Central School assembled children who had been attending one-room schoolhouses in Hamptonburgh, Blooming Grove and New Windsor under one roof.

In August 1957, the school board announced plans to build a new school and, upon its construction, send all of the district's elementary students there and to the school in Little Britain, allowing the Washingtonville Central School to be converted to a junior-senior high school. The board paid $500 for the option to buy a 15-acre farm on Toleman Road for $22,000 upon approval by the School District's voters. At the time, the district was renting classroom space from the local Presbyterian church. Voters approved the plan in April 1958 along with a five-classroom addition to the Central School and an expansion of the bus garage. The budget allotted for the construction of the school was $1,698,557 (equivalent to $18,954,486 in 2025), including a federal grant of $244,377 (equivalent to $2,727,044 in 2025) which was given due to the construction of Stewart Air Force Base within the district.

Up until the mid-1960s, the district operated a school in Salisbury Mills before abandoning it when it fell into disrepair. The district maintained possession of the property until 1974 when residents voted to transfer it to the Salisbury Mills Fire District. In the mid-1960s, prior to the construction of Round Hill Elementary School, the district rented space from the local Presbyterian and Congregational churches and sought to rent further space at the Crestview Lake beach club in New Windsor.

In 1962, voters overwhelmingly approved the $75,000 (equivalent to $798,000 in 2025) purchase of 108 acres of farmland adjacent to the central school building which stretched from the Otter Kill, across the Erie Railroad and New York State Route 94 to the Moodna Creek. School District voters approved construction of the current Washingtonville High School building on the Gruner farm site in a 1,169–640 vote on December 2, 1964. The original farmhouse was maintained by the School District as its administrative headquarters. It was largely unimproved until extensive renovations were approved in 1987.

Round Hill Elementary School opened in 1968 with a population of 581 students. The current high school building opened in the same year. To date, they are the most recent schools in the district to open. In February 1969, School District voters voted 1,125–343 against the construction of a new elementary school which would have been adjacent to the high school and would have cost an estimated $1.91 million to build (equivalent to $16.77 million in 2025).

In November 2003, School District voters agreed to a $39.8 million construction plan (equivalent to $69.7 million in 2025) which included an addition to the high school, modifications to the existing middle school and the construction of a new school building for seventh- and eighth-graders. Of that money, $27 million was earmarked for the new school. When estimates for that building came in well over budget, it was shelved and ultimately abandoned. In early 2007, a $9 million addition to and renovation of the high school was completed.

By 2018, Washingtonville was one of only five of the 726 school districts in the state which still did not provide full-day kindergarten. Full-day kindergarten was instituted at the start of the 2019–20 school year.

The Washingtonville Central School building later became the high school building and, until the 1990s, served as Washingtonville Junior High School. Little Britain Elementary School used to belong to Stewart Air Force Base and was only for children of parents in the military. The base is still active today. The high school has undergone several renovations, the last completed in January 2007 and in addition to adding on classrooms, added on three computer labs including a Mac lab.
