= Eddie Hawkins =

American soccer player

Personal information
- Position: Midfielder

College career
Years	Team	Apps	(Gls)
1980–1983	Hartwick Hawks	-	(30)

International career
1984	United States	1	(0)

Edward Lancen Hawkins is a former U.S. soccer midfielder. In 1984, he became the first native-born black player to appear with the U.S. national team.

== High school and college ==
Hawkins grew up in Washingtonville, New York where he attended Washingtonville High School. He was a three-sport athlete at Washingtonville, starring on the school's soccer, basketball and track teams. However, his talent lay with soccer and he was two-time All State, two-time National Coaches All-American and two time Parade high school All American. His talent attracted the attention of pro scouts and when he graduated in 1980, the Washington Diplomats of the North American Soccer League (NASL) selected him in the second round of the draft.

Hawkins chose to delay his entry into professional sports and entered Hartwick College. During his four seasons with the Hawks, he went to the 1980 NCAA Final Four. When he graduated in 1984, he had amassed 30 career goals and 10 career assists. He was inducted into the Hartwick College Athletic Hall of Fame in 1995.

Hawkins received his bachelor's degree in Economics and Management and received his master's degree in Information Technology at Pace University in 1990.

== Club career ==
By the time Hawkins graduated, the NASL had folded, but the Pittsburgh Spirit of Major Indoor Soccer League selected him in the first round of the draft in the spring of 1984. Hawkins remained at school to complete his degree. During those months, the Spirit traded his rights to the Minnesota Strikers who then sent him to the Dallas Sidekicks. Hawkins decided not to sign with the Sidekicks and remained in Westchester County playing for the Mt. Vernon Corsairs in the New York City Super League until he took a job as a computer programmer with IBM.

== National team ==
Hawkins was called up to the U.S. national team in 1984. When he entered the field for a December 2, 1984 game with Ecuador, he became the first native U.S. black soccer player to earn a cap. That game, part of the Miami Cup, ended in a 2–2 tie and Hawkins was subbed out for Dave Cayemitte in the second half.

== Post career ==
Since the conclusion of his playing career, Hawkins has launched ZenFooty Soccer Academy and the Zen United Club Soccer Programs. Zen United was launched in 2005, but was disbanded after five years. He continues with to be involved in private soccer training and has rebranded ZenFooty Soccer Academy to Zen Soccer School. Ed's site is www.ZenSoccerSchool.com and his company offers private and group training sessions for all age levels.

Many of the players he has coached have moved on to compete on NCAA Division I, II and III soccer teams across the nation including Georgia State, Hartwick, Loyola University Maryland, Marquette, UIC, UW-Parkside and Washington University in St. Louis.

== Personal life ==
Hawkins lives in the Chicago area with his wife, Eyleen, whom he met while in graduate school. They have three children: Eryka who played on the women's soccer team at Georgia State for five seasons, Elyssa who was a four-year member of the women's water polo team at Carthage College, and Edison. Elyssa has served as a water polo coach at Pomona-Pitzer Colleges and Biola University, both in California.
