= Washingtonville High School =

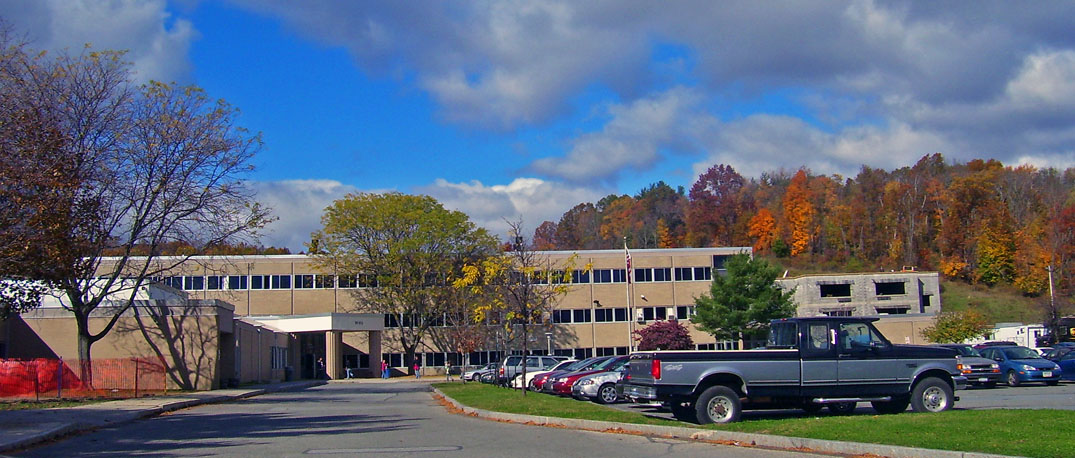
- The exterior of the school in 2006

Location
- 54 West Main St. Washingtonville, NY 10992; 41°25′28″N 74°10′25″W

Information
- School type: Public, High school
- School district: Washingtonville Central School District
- CEEB code: 335795
- NCES School ID: 363003004040
- Principal: Robyn Boardman
- Teaching staff: 99.85 (FTE)
- Grades: 9–12
- Enrollment: 1,308 (2024–2025)
- Average class size: 23 (2011–12)
- Student to teacher ratio: 13.1
- Language: English
- Colors: Blue and Gold
- Athletics conference: NYSPHSAA Section IX
- Team name: Wizards
- Accreditation: Middle States Association of Colleges and Schools
- Newspaper: 54 West
- Communities served: Washingtonville; Town of Blooming Grove; Town of New Windsor (part)
- Feeder schools: Washingtonville Middle School
- Website: https://hs.wcsdk12.org/

Washingtonville Senior High School is located on West Main Street (New York State Route 94) in the village of Washingtonville, New York. It is the high school for the Washingtonville Central School District.

== History ==
Prior to 1933, Washingtonville students were offered only three years of high school and had to go to nearby schools if interested in completing a fourth year. Washingtonville's schools centralized into the Washingtonville Central School District in 1931 and a central school building, which now serves as Washingtonville Middle School, was completed in 1933 for students of all ages in the district. Washingtonville High School graduated its first senior class in 1934, a total of five students.

"Rural High School" (1951)

In 1951, the United States Information Service released a propaganda short film about the high school entitled "Rural High School." According to the National Archives and Records Administration, it is an idealized portrayal of a typical "large rural high school" and "school and home life in America" and depicts "scenes of the school; classes; social activities; and students' homes."

References to Washingtonville sports teams wearing blue and gold date back to at least 1940. The use of the "Wizard" nickname for Washingtonville sports teams dates back to at least 1962 when the moniker was applied in local newspaper coverage.

The district's population continued to grow and, by 1962, the New York State Department of Education recommended that the district expand its facilities. That year, the school exercised an option to buy 108 acres of farmland belonging to Walter Gruner adjacent to the central school building, stretching from the Otter Kill, across the Erie Railroad and Route 94 to the Moodna Creek. On October 24, 1962, School District voters, by a margin of 555–241, approved the purchase of all 108 acres for $75,000 (equivalent to $798,000 in 2025). School District voters approved construction of the current school building on the Gruner farm site in a 1,169–640 vote on December 2, 1964. At the end of that school year, the district graduated its first senior class with more than 100 students. The building was completed at a cost of $2.7 million (equivalent to $25 million in 2025) and dedicated in a ceremony on March 31, 1968. In its first year, it held 1,050 students in grades 8–12. After the first year, it was attended by students in grades 9–12.

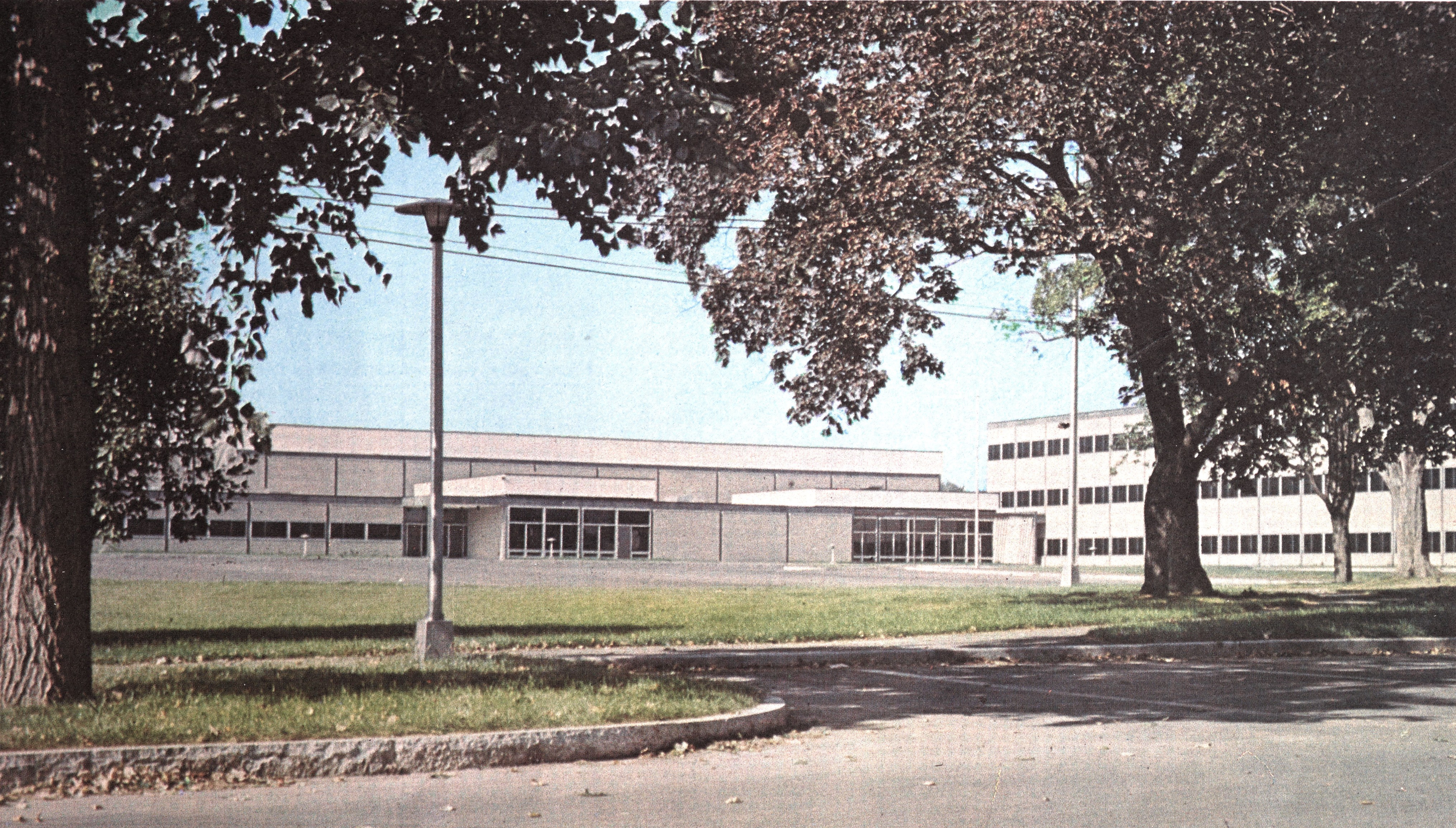
The school shortly before its opening in 1968

In April 1969, a 17-year-old Washingtonville student was charged with second degree manslaughter after a fight in the parking lot of the school. After the fight, 17-year-old Anthony Scibetta boarded a school bus and collapsed. He was pronounced dead on arrival at St. Luke's Hospital in Newburgh. Police said his death was caused by a concussion.

On June 1, 1972, Benn Fields won the school's first NYSPHSAA athletics championship when he cleared 6 ft 6 in (1.98 m) in the high jump.

The composition and enrollment of the school building varied in the first two decades of its existence. For at least one schoolyear, in 1978–79, the ninth grade students were split between the high school and middle school buildings. In the 1980s, ninth grade students continued to be educated in the middle school building.

Historical enrollment

Year	Pop.	±% p.a.
1986	927	—
1987	882	−4.85%
1988	839	−4.88%
1989	821	−2.15%
1990	847	+3.17%
1991	864	+2.01%
1992	1,141	+32.06%
1993	1,127	−1.23%
1994	1,137	+0.89%
1995	1,185	+4.22%
1996	1,274	+7.51%
1997	1,326	+4.08%
1998	1,368	+3.17%
1999	1,424	+4.09%
2000	1,454	+2.11%
2001	1,494	+2.75%
2002	1,586	+6.16%
2003	1,677	+5.74%
2004	1,667	−0.60%
2005	1,709	+2.52%

Year	Pop.	±% p.a.
2006	1,653	−3.28%
2007	1,692	+2.36%
2008	1,628	−3.78%
2009	1,573	−3.38%
2010	1,564	−0.57%
2011	1,512	−3.32%
2012	1,482	−1.98%
2013	1,445	−2.50%
2014	1,411	−2.35%
2015	1,381	−2.13%
2016	1,393	+0.87%
2017	1,395	+0.14%
2018	1,446	+3.66%
2019	1,337	−7.54%
2020	1,321	−1.20%
2021	1,325	+0.30%
2022	1,318	−0.53%
2023	1,319	+0.08%
2024	1,308	−0.83%

Years listed are the first years of the given fall–spring schoolyear.
Source: "NCES Elementary and Secondary Information System". National Center for Education Statistics.

In May 1989, due to "overcrowding that [wa]s starting to face the district as the result of residential home building in the area," residents voted 1,121–797 to approve a $16 million plan (equivalent to $41.6 million in 2025) to dramatically expand the school by adding more than 30 classrooms, a swimming pool and an elevator among other features. The addition was completed in time for the beginning of the 1992–93 school year and also included a courtyard and covered entryway. Upon the completion of the expansion, sixth grade students were shifted from the district's elementary schools to Washingtonville Junior High School, which became Washingtonville Middle School, and ninth grade students were moved into the high school, which ceased to be a senior high school and adopted a traditional four-year high school model.

By September 2003, the School District's population had grown to the point that approximately 70 classrooms had more than 30 students per teacher and the school was over-enrolled by more than 300 students. In November 2003, School District voters agreed to a $39.8 million plan which included an addition to the high school, which had last been expanded in 1992. In early 2007, a $9 million construction project (equivalent to $14 million in 2025) was completed. It added a new cafeteria and a 25,000-square-foot wing with 13 classrooms, three computer rooms and an art room.

In April 2005, four alleged gang members from Rockland County entered the school during classes and assaulted a 16-year-old student. All four teenagers were charged with felonies.

On the morning of June 9, 2006, amid final exams, seven people at the school were affected by noxious fumes, two of whom required treatment at a hospital. The gasses were believed to have been created deliberately by students mixing cleaning products in a boys' bathroom. Classes were cancelled and the school was evacuated for the day.

The school's principal was arrested in October 2010 and charged in New Windsor with endangering the welfare of a child and aggravated harassment and in Cornwall with third-degree sexual abuse, forcible touching and endangering the welfare of a child. He had been accused by a 16-year-old student of making inappropriate advances. The forcible touching charge was dismissed in July 2011. In January 2012, the principal agreed to plead guilty only to endangering the welfare of a child. He was sentenced to pay a $1,000 fine and forfeit his teaching license.

In 2014, Washingtonville Wizards placekicker Derek Deoul set a state record with 27 career field goals.

The school was subject to false bomb threats in April 2015 and January 2017. The first was caused by a misunderstanding of the slang use of "bomb" as an adjective but resulted in an evacuation nonetheless. The second was orchestrated as a ploy by a student to get out of class. The student and an accomplice in Brooklyn were ultimately arrested.

In May and August 2018, 18-year-old senior Brendan Vaughan made multiple threats to carry out a school shooting and began taking steps toward planning an attack. He was arrested in March 2019 and pleaded guilty in December of that year to three charges in the United States District Court for the Southern District of New York. He was sentenced to 60 months in prison. The United States Court of Appeals for the Second Circuit upheld his sentence on appeal in 2022.

== Notable alumni ==
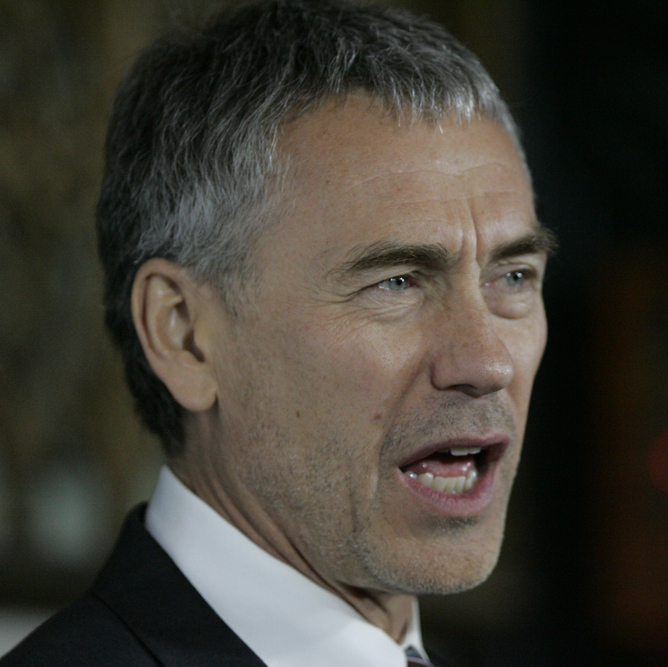
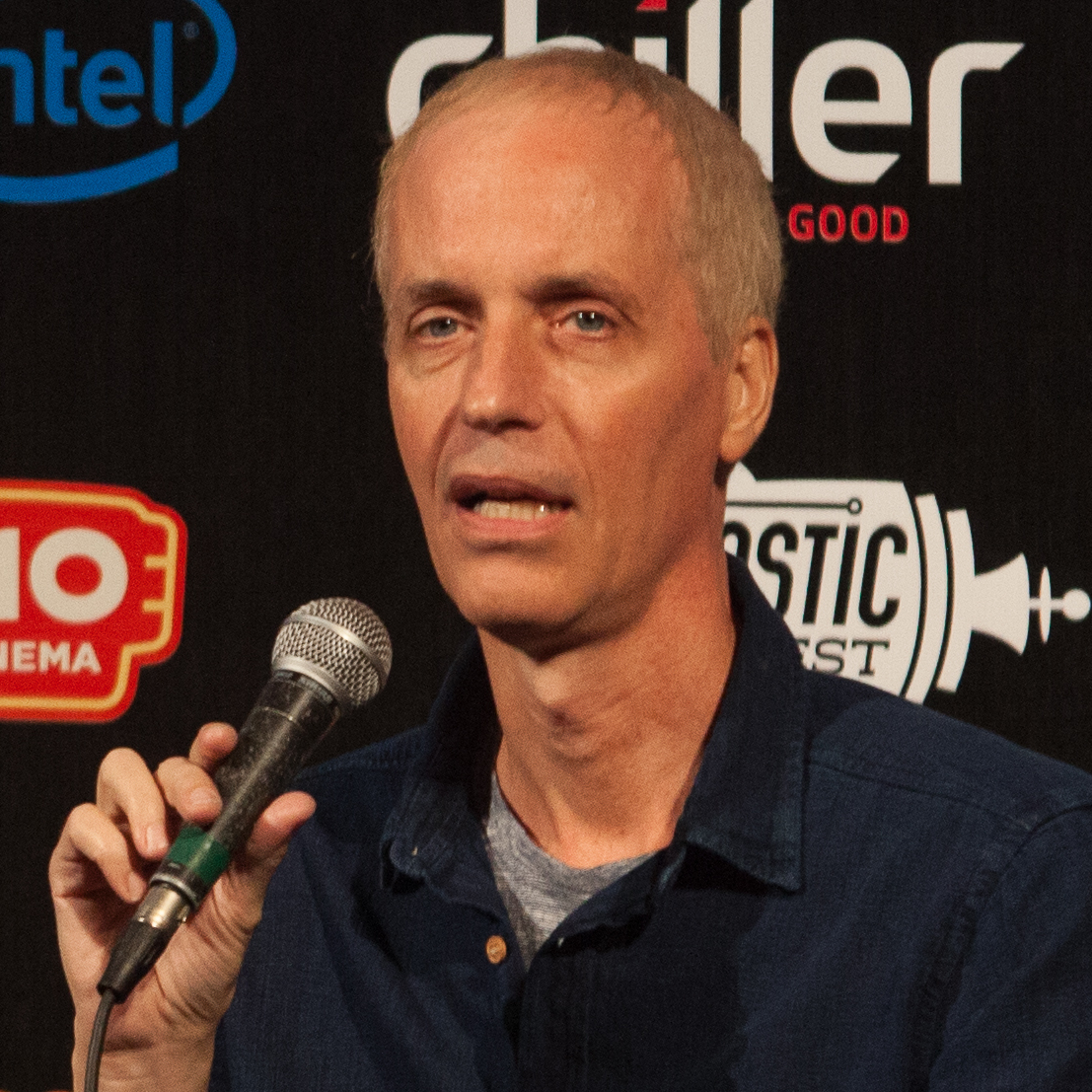
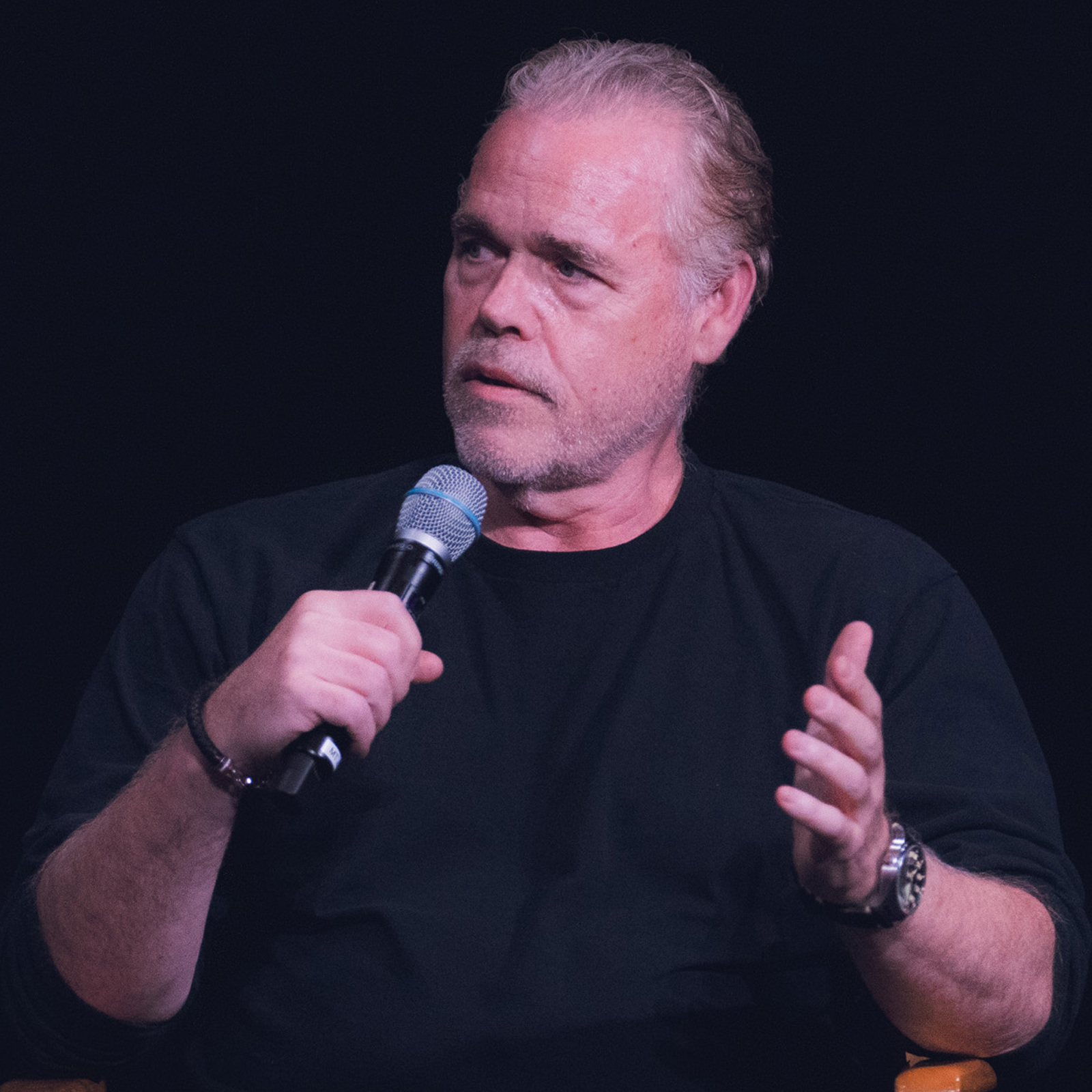
The Gilroy brothers, Tony, Dan and John (from left to right), all graduated from Washingtonville High School.
- Tony DeVito, Class of 1990, professional wrestler. Wrestled for the World Wrestling Federation, ECW and numerous smaller federations. Was in the tag team "The Baldies".
- Benn Fields, Class of 1972, American high jumper
- Dan Gilroy, Class of 1977, screenwriter and director best known for Nightcrawler
- John Gilroy, Class of 1977, film editor
- Tony Gilroy, Class of 1974, screenwriter, producer and director best known for The Bourne Ultimatum, The Bourne Supremacy, The Bourne Identity, Proof of Life, The Devil's Advocate and Michael Clayton.
- Eddie Hawkins, Class of 1980, American soccer player
- Martin Hehir, Class of 2011, distance runner
- Tom Judson, Class of 1978, actor, composer and adult film star
- Mychael Knight, Class of 1996, fashion designer. Knight was a finalist on Project Runway.
- Brittany Kolmel, Class of 2005, American soccer player
- Rich Lee, Class of 1996, director. Lee directed music videos for Eminem, The Black Eyed Peas, Norah Jones, Michael Bublé and The All-American Rejects.
- James Mangold, Class of 1981, screenwriter and director best known for Walk the Line, 3:10 to Yuma and Cop Land
- Luke Manley, Class of 2010, internet personality and actor
- Scott Pioli, Class of 1983, executive with several National Football League teams
- Naomi Sewell Richardson, Class of 1910, the first African-American graduate of the school and one of the founding members of the Delta Sigma Theta sorority
- Dennis Smith, American firefighter and author

== Notable faculty ==
- David Bernsley (born 1969), American-Israeli basketball player
- Nick Ryder (born 1941), American professional football player
