= Mohawk Hudson River Marathon =

American race

- Date: 2nd Sunday in October
- Location: Albany, New York
- Event type: Road
- Distance: Marathon; 26.2 miles (42.2 km)
- Established: 2005 (21 years ago)
- Course records: 2:14:14 (men); 2:34:21 (women)
- Participants: 513 finishers (2024)

The Mohawk Hudson River Marathon is an annual marathon and half marathon that takes place in the Capital District of the state of New York. Founded in 2005, the race is administered by the Hudson Mohawk Road Runners Club. In recent years, the marathon event has had approximately 500 finishers.

A point-to-point course, the marathon begins in the town of Schenectady, New York and proceeds eastbound on a paved bike bath along the Mohawk River. Runners exit the bike path in the town of Watervliet for a few miles, and then rejoin the path for the final 5 miles southbound along the Hudson River. The finish line is at the Corning Preserve Boat Launch near downtown Albany. The half marathon event is run on the second half of the marathon course. The race provides free shuttle buses for runners from the Hilton hotel in downtown Albany to the start line.

The male and female winners each receive $1,500, while second and third place earn $1,000 and $500, respectively. The top three Masters runners (age 40+) win $500, $250, and $125 respectively.

== Winners ==
=== 2014–present ===
Year	Men's winner	Time	Women's winner	Time
2014	Jared Burdick	2:26:35	Jodie Robertson	2:34:22
2015	Bryan Morseman	2:24:01	Megan Skeels	2:46:40
2016	Tyler Andrews	2:15:52	Roberta Groner	2:37:54
2017	Matt Rand	2:27:25	Alanna Poretta	2:59:46
2018	Nick Lemon	2:25:28	Joy Miller	2:51:48
2019	Joe Whelan	2:18:24	Christine Myers	2:48:35
2021	Dylan Gearinger	2:20:22	Jenny Goswami	2:44:55
2022	Joe Whelan	2:14:14	Samantha Roecker	2:52:20
2023	Alexander Grout	2:31:55	Christine Myers	3:00:09
2024	Paolo Fiore	2:30:45	Eliza Kerschner	2:51:56
2025	Dylan Gearinger	2:23:49	Kat Morrissey	2:53:25
2026	Dylan Gearinger	2:25:47	Eliza Parker	2:53:39
