= Joe Whelan (runner) =

American distance runner (born 1990)

- Whelan at the 2025 Berlin Marathon

Personal information
- Born: November 13, 1990 (age 36) Hamburg, New York, United States

Sport
- Country: United States
- Events: Marathon, half marathon
- College team: Syracuse University
- Team: Bergen Elite

Achievements and titles
- Personal bests: Marathon: 2:09:41; Half Marathon: 1:03:04

Joe Whelan is an American distance runner who specializes in the marathon. He competed collegiately for Syracuse University before transitioning to long-distance road races. Whelan qualified for the U.S. Olympic Trials Marathon in 2020 and 2024.

== Early life ==
Whelan grew up in Hamburg, New York and attended Hamburg High School. He was a standout cross country runner, winning the New York Class A state championship in 2008. He also qualified for the 2008 Footlocker National Cross Country Championship, where he placed 9th.

Whelan stayed close to home for college, attending Syracuse University. He was an All-Region cross country runner and placed 55th at the 2012 NCAA Championship. On the track, Whelan recorded personal-best times of 14:21 in the 5,000 meters and 8:53 in the 3,000 meter steeplechase. While at Syracuse, he was teammates with elite marathoners Martin Hehir and Colin Bennie.

== Career ==
After college, Whelan took a break from competitive running. He relocated to Texas where he worked as a ranch hand for his cousin’s rock milling company. He performed manual labor and operated heavy machinery for up to 10 hours per day in scorching heat. Whelan logged training runs after the work day to clear his head and get away from the other workers, all of whom lived on the ranch with Whelan.

During his time living in Texas, Whelan also was a volunteer assistant coach at the University of North Texas. He wasn’t paid as a volunteer, so he delivered pizzas at night to make ends meet. Despite the challenges, Whelan was able to win the 2018 Austin Marathon in a time of 2:21.

A few months later, Whelan clocked a time of 2:16:30 at Grandma’s Marathon, which qualified him for the 2020 United States Olympic Trials (marathon).

In 2019, he moved back to Upstate New York and took on part-time work as a house painter, which afforded him more time to train for marathons. Whelan improved his marathon best to 2:13:39 at the 2019 Grandma’s Marathon. Despite having a goal of making the 2020 Olympic team, a hip injury prevented Whelan from competing at the 2020 Olympic Trials in Atlanta.

He returned to marathon racing in 2022, notching a time of 2:15:36 at Grandma’s Marathon and 2:14:41 at the California International Marathon. Whelan also won the Mohawk Hudson River Marathon in a course record time of 2:14:14. He had previously won the event in 2019. All three results were fast enough to qualify Whelan for the 2024 United States Olympic Trials (marathon).

On February 19, 2023, Whelan placed 2nd at the Austin Marathon. Shortly after completing the race, he proposed to his girlfriend at the finish line. In the fall, Whelan won the Wineglass Marathon and placed 16th at the New York City Marathon.

On February 3rd, 2024, Whelan placed 89th out of 200 men at the 2024 US Olympic Trials Marathon in Orlando, Florida.

On April 21, 2025, Whelan competed as part of the professional field at the Boston Marathon. He clocked a new personal-best time of 2:12:16 to place 20th. He was the 8th American finisher and the fastest member of the Puma Project3 event, which earned him $3,000.

On September 27, Whelan placed 26th overall at the Berlin Marathon. On November 8, Whelan won the Indianapolis Monumental Marathon in a time of 2:12:29, which broke the previous course record of 2:15:41. On December 7, Whelan placed second at the USATF Marathon Championship in Sacramento, CA with a career-best time of 2:09:41.

On February 15th, 2026 Whelan won the Austin Marathon with a time of 2:13:18. In April he finished 20th at the Hamburg Marathon in a time of 2:11:09.

On 24 May 2026 Whelan won the Buffalo Marathon in a course record time of 2:13:33.

== Personal ==
As of 2024, Whelan lives in Webster, New York and works as a service representative.
