= Nick Ryder =

American football player (born 1941)

No. 34
- Position: Fullback

Personal information
- Born: October 31, 1941 (age 85); Nyack, New York, U.S.
- Listed height: 5 ft 11 in (1.80 m)
- Listed weight: 210 lb (95 kg)

Career information
- High school: Haverstraw
- College: Miami
- NFL draft: 1963: 10th round, 139th overall pick
- AFL draft: 1963: 16th round, 123rd overall pick

Career history
- Detroit Lions (1963–1964)

Career NFL statistics
- Rushing yards: 34
- Rushing average: 1.6
- Receptions: 4
- Receiving yards: 30
- Total touchdowns: 2
- Stats at Pro Football Reference

Nicholas F. Ryder (born October 31, 1941) is an American former professional football player who was a fullback for the Detroit Lions of the National Football League (NFL). He played college football for the Miami Hurricanes.

== Early life ==
Ryder was born in Nyack, New York and attended Harverstraw High School.

== College career ==
Ryder played three seasons for the Miami Hurricanes as a running back and defensive back. As a senior, he led the team with 702 rushing yards and six rushing touchdowns and catching nine passes for 127 yards and one touchdown and tied for the team lead with three interceptions on defense. His 702 yards was the highest total by a Miami player during the 1960s and he left the school as the fifth leading rusher in school history with 1,320 rushing yards.

== Professional career ==
Ryder was selected by the Detroit Lions in the 10th round of the 1963 NFL draft and by the New York Jets in the 16th round of the 1963 AFL draft. He signed with the Lions and played two seasons with the team, rushing for 34 yards and one touchdown on 21 carries and catching four passes for 30 yards and one touchdown.

== Coaching career ==
After his football career ended, Ryder coached at North Rockland High School and Notre Dame High School in Utica, New York before joining the coaching staff at Cortland State. He earned a master's degree while serving as a graduate assistant at Cortland. He became the head coach at Maine-Endwell High School before leaving to join Bill Campbell's staff at Columbia University as and offensive backfield coach. In 1988, he became the athletic director at Washingtonville High School. He later became assistant principal at the same school.
