= Colin Bennie =

American distance runner (born 1995)

Personal information
- Born: June 3, 1995 (age 31) Princeton, Massachusetts, U.S.

Sport
- Country: United States
- Event(s): Marathon, half marathon
- College team: Syracuse University
- Team: Brooks

Achievements and titles
- Personal best(s): Marathon: 2:09:38; Half marathon: 1:02:46; 10 miles: 47:08

Colin Bennie is an American distance runner who specializes in the marathon. He was an All-American runner at Syracuse University before shifting to longer races after college. Bennie placed in the top 10 at the 2020 and 2024 U.S. Olympic Trials Marathon.

== Early life ==
Bennie grew up in Princeton, Massachusetts, and attended Wachusett Regional High School. He was the Massachusetts state runner-up in the 2-mile run with a time of 9:25. Bennie continued his career at Syracuse University, where he earned NCAA All-American honors in cross country. On the track, he registered times of 28:37 in the 10,000 meters and 13:38 for 5,000 meters. While competing for the Orange, Bennie was teammates with elite marathoners, Martin Hehir and Joe Whelan.

== Career ==
After graduating from Syracuse in 2018, Bennie made a successful transition to longer races. In a 2021 interview, Bennie stated that his two older brothers inspired him to train for marathons. He placed 19th at the 2019 Houston Half Marathon in a time of 1:02:46, which qualified him for the 2020 United States Olympic Trials (marathon).

Bennie took 6th place at the 2019 USA 15 km Championship in a time of 44:16. In the fall of 2019, he claimed 11th at the USA 20 km Championship.

His debut marathon came at the 2020 Olympic Trials in Atlanta, where Bennie placed 9th of 235 men in a time of 2:12:14. Later in 2020, Bennie improved his marathon time to 2:09:38 at the Marathon Project event in Arizona.

He continued to post strong performances in 2021, taking 6th at the USA 15 km Championship and 7th at the Boston Marathon. He was the top American finisher in Boston, beating the pre-race favorite CJ Albertson by 18 seconds.

In 2022, Bennie finished 5th at the USA 15 km Championship and 19th at the Boston Marathon. Over the summer, he placed 7th at the Beach to Beacon 10K, which was his third top-10 result in the event. In October, Bennie clocked a time of 47:08 at the USA 10 Mile Championship, good enough for 10th place.

His best performance in 2023 came at the Cherry Blossom Ten Mile Run, where he placed 10th in a world-class field.

Bennie competed in the 2024 United States Olympic Trials (marathon) in Orlando, where he achieved another top-10 finish, clocking a time of 2:12:17. In the fall, Bennie placed 12th at the 2024 New York City Marathon.

Bennie won the Bay to Breakers 12K road race in 2023 and 2024.

At the 2025 Boston Marathon, Bennie placed 18th in a time of 2:11:46. He was the 6th American finisher. In the fall of 2025, Bennie finished 15th at the New York City Marathon.
