= Scott Pioli =

American football executive (born 1965)

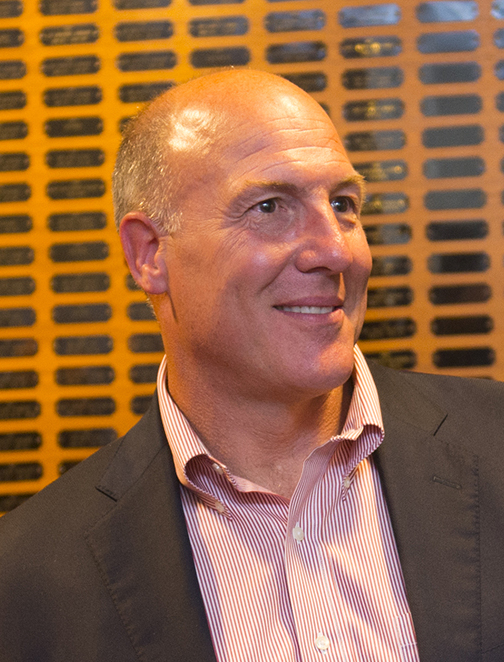
- Pioli in 2019

Iowa Hawkeyes
- Title: Consultant

Personal information
- Born: March 31, 1965 (age 61); Washingtonville, New York, U.S.

Career information
- High school: Washingtonville
- College: Central Connecticut; Syracuse

Career history

Coaching
- Syracuse (1988–1989) Graduate assistant; Murray State (1990) Offensive line coach; Murray State (1991) Defensive line coach

Operations
- Cleveland Browns (1992–1995) Pro personnel assistant; Baltimore Ravens (1996) Pro personnel coordinator; New York Jets (1997–1999) Director of pro personnel; New England Patriots (2000) Assistant director of player personnel; New England Patriots (2001) Director of player personnel; New England Patriots (2002–2008) Vice president of player personnel; Kansas City Chiefs (2009–2012) General manager; Atlanta Falcons (2014–2019) Assistant general manager; Iowa (2025–present) Consultant

Awards and highlights
- 3× Super Bowl champion (XXXVI, XXXVIII, XXXIX); 3× PFWA Executive of the Year (2003, 2007, 2010); 2× Sporting News NFL Executive of the Year Award (2003, 2004)
- Executive profile at Pro Football Reference

Scott Reno Pioli (born March 31, 1965) is an American professional football executive who currently serves as a consultant for the Iowa Hawkeyes. He was an NFL analyst for NBC Sports' Football Night in America, NBC Sports Network's Pro Football Talk, Sirius XM NFL Radio and the NFL Network. He previously served as a front office executive for the Cleveland Browns, Baltimore Ravens, New York Jets, New England Patriots, Kansas City Chiefs, and Atlanta Falcons. Pioli served as the director – and later vice president – of player personnel for the Patriots from 2001 to 2008 when the franchise won three Super Bowl championships.

== Early life ==
Pioli grew up in Washingtonville, New York and attended Washingtonville High School, where he played linebacker and defensive line before graduating in 1983. Between 1983 and 1988 he attended Central Connecticut State University, graduating in 1988 with a degree in communications. He was a three-time Division II All-New England selection as a defensive tackle. In 2005, Central Connecticut inducted Pioli into their hall of fame. In 1988, after graduating with a degree in communications, he accepted a two-year graduate assistant position at Syracuse University, where he also earned a master's degree from the S. I. Newhouse School of Public Communications.

Pioli served as a graduate assistant with the Syracuse football team from 1988 to 1989. In 1990, he began a two-year stint at Murray State University as an offensive line coach in his first year (1990) and as a defensive line coach in his second year (1991).

== Professional executive career ==
=== Cleveland Browns/Baltimore Ravens ===
In 1992, Pioli was hired as a pro personnel assistant by Bill Belichick, then the head coach of the Cleveland Browns. Pioli's relationship with Belichick dated back to the mid-1980s, when as a student at Central Connecticut, Pioli would drive 90 minutes to the New York Giants training camp. Through a mutual friend, Pioli was introduced to then-Giants defensive coordinator Belichick, who was impressed at Pioli's dedication to travel to each practice and offered him a place to stay.

In Cleveland, Pioli was responsible for the evaluation of both college prospects and veteran free agents, as well as negotiating various player contracts. When the Browns moved to Baltimore after the 1995 season, Pioli stayed with the team and was promoted to Pro Personnel Coordinator for the Ravens' 1996 season and was part of the personnel staff that drafted eventual HOFers Jonathan Ogden and Ray Lewis.

=== New York Jets ===
In 1997, Pioli rejoined Belichick and was hired by the New York Jets as the team's director of pro personnel. Pioli was credited with the signing of a number of veteran free agents, including Kevin Mawae, Vinny Testaverde and Bryan Cox, who played critical roles in the Jets' rebuilding process which helped the team rebound from a 1–15 record in 1996 to a 12–4 record in 1998. The 1998 Jets recorded a franchise-high 12 wins and their first division title since 1968.

=== New England Patriots ===
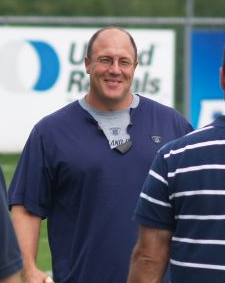
Pioli during 2007 Patriots training camp

When Belichick accepted the Patriots' head coaching position in 2000, Pioli became vice president of player personnel. The two eventually became the first personnel director/head coach tandem in league annals to win three Super Bowls during a four-year span (2001–2004). He and Belichick split the duties usually held by a general manager on most other NFL teams, though Belichick had the final say.

Pioli's skills as a talent evaluator helped create a consistent championship contender in New England. He was regularly recognized for his ability to build a team, not simply collecting individual talent, helping to make the Patriots a "model franchise". From 2000 to 2008, the Patriots had an NFL-best record of 102–42 (.708) and registered 14 playoff victories. Pioli worked in close coordination with Belichick, bringing players to the Patriots who fit into the framework of the club's team concept. Pioli and Belichick's teams were noted for the depth of talent at all the positions and used an effective combination of draft picks, free-agent signings, and trades to continually upgrade their roster. The most-notable selection in an NFL draft by Pioli and Belichick was quarterback Tom Brady, who was chosen 199th overall in the 2000 NFL draft.

In his tenure with the Patriots, Pioli earned promotions from assistant director of player personnel to director of player personnel in 2001, and to vice president of player personnel in 2002. Also, Pioli earned a contract extension in 2005 after being pursued by several NFL teams to become general manager.

In 2007, the Patriots finished their regular season with a 16–0 record, a first in NFL history. The team advanced to Super Bowl XLII but lost famously to the New York Giants 17–14 and failed to finish the season with a perfect 19–0 record. Prior to the season, Pioli executed trades to acquire wide receivers Wes Welker and Randy Moss, both of whom helped the Patriots set multiple NFL records on offense.

=== Kansas City Chiefs ===
==== 2009 ====
After the 2008 Patriots season, Pioli was interviewed by the Cleveland Browns to replace the recently fired Phil Savage as the team's general manager. Though initially seen as a long-shot, Pioli was also interviewed by the Kansas City Chiefs and was reportedly the number one candidate to succeed Carl Peterson as general manager. The Chiefs confirmed that Pioli was hired on January 13, 2009. Later that day, Belichick released the following statement to the press:

To sum up in words everything Scott Pioli has meant to this organization and to me personally would be difficult, if not impossible. From the day I met him, he has demonstrated a passion for football and respect for the game that is second to none. It has been extremely gratifying for me to follow Scott's career ascension from the bottom of the totem pole in Cleveland to his place as a pillar of championship teams in New England. Now with the opportunity to steer his own ship and a vision of building a winner, there is no more capable, hardworking, loyal, team-oriented person than Scott Pioli. On a personal level, the Belichick-Pioli bond runs far deeper than our workplace, as we and our families have shared countless memories away from football. Working side by side with one of my best friends for almost two decades is special enough in itself. But to help each other achieve success beyond our dreams is a blessing and something I will always remember and appreciate.

Pioli was introduced at a press conference in Kansas City the following day. On January 23, 2009, Pioli fired head coach Herman Edwards. To replace Edwards, Pioli hired Arizona Cardinals offensive coordinator Todd Haley as head coach on February 5, 2009.

==== 2010 ====
Following the season, Pioli hired former Notre Dame head coach Charlie Weis as offensive coordinator and former Cleveland Browns head coach Romeo Crennel as defensive coordinator; both held the same roles in New England for each of the three Super Bowl winning seasons during Pioli's tenure with the Patriots. In 2010, the Chiefs won their first AFC West division title since 2003 and completed the season 10–6. The move from worst to first in the AFC West earned him NFL Executive of the Year honors.

==== 2011 ====
The Chiefs were 7–9 in the 2011 season. Chiefs main passing receiver Tony Moeaki was injured in the last preseason game against Green Bay which the Chiefs lost 20–19. The Chiefs were 4–3 in Week 8 after a four-game winning streak. Matt Cassel broke his hand in Week 13 in a loss against Denver and was out for the remainder of the season. After a 37–10 loss to the New York Jets in Week 14, Pioli fired coach Haley and elevated defense coordinator Crennel to acting coach. In Week 15, the Chiefs stunned the defending Super Bowl champion Packers 19–14 in the Packers' only defeat of the regular season. The Chiefs remained mathematically eligible for the AFC West championship in a weak division clear to the next to the last week of the season and they defeated the eventual AFC West winner Denver Broncos in the final game of the season.

==== 2012 ====
Pioli's final year in Kansas City was fraught with controversy and fan unrest as the Chiefs floundered to franchise-worst 2–14 season in 2012, securing their first #1 pick in team history.

In January, Kansas City Star reporter Kent Babb published a piece that interviewed former Chiefs' head coach Todd Haley in which Haley indicated his belief that the team had bugged his personal cell phone. Other employees referenced team security walking the halls of the offices to ensure that office blinds were always drawn during practice to not avoid giving away information, and one fan referenced threats of having personal belongings, like cellular phones, confiscated. Such behaviors were attributed to Pioli's desire to maintain absolute secrecy about the facility.

Pioli's administrative practices were also the subject of an age-discrimination lawsuit, which is currently under review.

Early in the season, a group of disgruntled Kansas City fans organized a movement, which called itself "Save Our Chiefs." It engaged in several protests on Pioli's tenure, including a local pilot to fly over Arrowhead Stadium towing banners, urging for Pioli's ouster, during multiple home games.

Pioli was the first person to confront Jovan Belcher on December 1, 2012. He walked to the entrance of the team's practice area, adjoining Arrowhead, pointing to where Belcher had a gun pointed at his head. Belcher had killed his girlfriend a few minutes earlier. Pioli was joined by Chiefs coach Romeo Crennel. Belcher shot himself in the head and was reported to have told Pioli, "I came here to tell you thank you...Thank you for my chance. I love you, bro." Pioli had signed Belcher as an undrafted free agent in 2009 and gave a eulogy at Belcher's Kansas City funeral service.

The Chiefs won the game the following day against the Carolina Panthers, the only home game victory of the season. There were no protests on the day of the game, and both Crennel and Pioli received positive comments on how they had handled the situation.

Both Crennel and Pioli were fired at the end of the season; Pioli was formally fired on January 4, 2013.

The Chiefs had six players on the 2013 Pro Bowl team (Eric Berry, strong safety; Jamaal Charles, running back who set various NFL and franchise records during the season; Dustin Colquitt, punter; Tamba Hali, outside linebacker; Derrick Johnson, inside/middle linebacker; Justin Houston, outside linebacker). Berry and Hali were designated starters. However, only two of the six players were acquired by Pioli. Only three NFL teams had more Pro Bowl picks San Francisco (9), Houston (8), New England (7). The three teams made the playoffs.

=== Atlanta Falcons ===
Pioli was hired as the assistant general manager of the Atlanta Falcons on January 22, 2014. The team announced his resignation on May 16, 2019.

=== Iowa ===
On June 15, 2025, the University of Iowa hired Pioli as a consultant.

== Awards and honors ==
Pioli is the youngest and one of only three NFL executives to win the Sporting News NFL Executive of the Year Award in consecutive years, a feat he accomplished after winning the award for the second straight year following the 2004 season.

On June 24, 2009, ESPN.com announced its All-Decade Moments naming Scott Pioli Personnel Man of the Decade. "No one in the league does a better job of scouting their own team, and [at the Patriots] Pioli was orchestrating all of that."

=== 2001 season ===
- The Dallas Morning News – NFL Executive of the Year Award

=== 2003 season ===
- Pro Football Weekly – NFL Executive of the Year Award
- Sporting News – George Young NFL Executive of the Year Award
- Sports Illustrated – NFL Executive of the Year Award

=== 2004 season ===
- NFL Players Association – Executive Achievement Award
- San Francisco Chronicle – Executive of the Year Award
- Sporting News – George Young NFL Executive of the Year Award
- Sports Illustrated – NFL Executive of the Year Award
- USA Today – NFL Executive of the Year Award

=== 2007 season ===
- The Dallas Morning News – NFL Executive of the Year Award
- Pro Football Weekly – NFL Executive of the Year Award
- San Francisco Chronicle – Executive of the Year Award

=== 2010 season ===
- Pro Football Weekly – NFL Executive of the Year Award
- Sports Illustrated – NFL Executive of the Year Award

=== Decade (2000s) ===
- Sports Illustrated – #1 GM/Pro Sports Executive
- Sports Illustrated – NFL's Top Personnel Executive/Scout
- Sporting News – NFL Executive of the Decade
- ESPN.com – NFL Personnel Man of the Decade

== Personal life ==
Pioli and his wife Dallas have a daughter named Mia Costa. Mia was born in 2003 while Pioli was in New England. While he was with the Kansas City Chiefs, Pioli often brought his daughter on the field before games. Mia attended high school at The Lovett School in Atlanta, Georgia, and is now a student at Boston College. Dallas is the daughter of former NFL head coach Bill Parcells.

He currently serves on the board of directors for various non-profit foundations including The Alliance Theater in Atlanta and College for Every Student (CFES), a national non-profit organization that partners with public schools in high-need communities to raise student aspirations and performance. Pioli has also established and endowed scholarships at his alma mater, Central Connecticut State University for students that have been named CFES Scholars. While in Kansas City, he and his wife were very involved with The Children's Place and they served as Co-Chairs for their 2013 Gala.

In addition to the endowed scholarship at CCSU, Pioli has established an endowed arts scholarship at the National Italian American Foundation (NIAF) and another at WIN for KC (Women's Intersport Network), a program designed to develop the physical and emotional well-being of girls and women through involvement in sports and fitness while providing opportunities for participation and leadership development. While employed with the Chiefs, he also created a program that awarded two annual scholarships for children of Chiefs employees.

Pioli still serves as advisory council member of the NFL's Bill Walsh Minority Coaching Fellowship, helping to make the NFL a more diverse and inclusive league. He also served on the NFL's general managers' advisory committee, providing advice and counsel to the NFL Football Operations department on the integrity of the game and possible areas for improvement. He also was a member of the NFL's CEC Executive Working Group, a subcommittee of the Management Council Executive Committee.

Pioli was inducted into the National Italian American Sports Hall of Fame in 2014.
