= Blooming Grove United Church of Christ =

Historic church in New York, United States

- Blooming Grove Church
- U.S. National Register of Historic Places
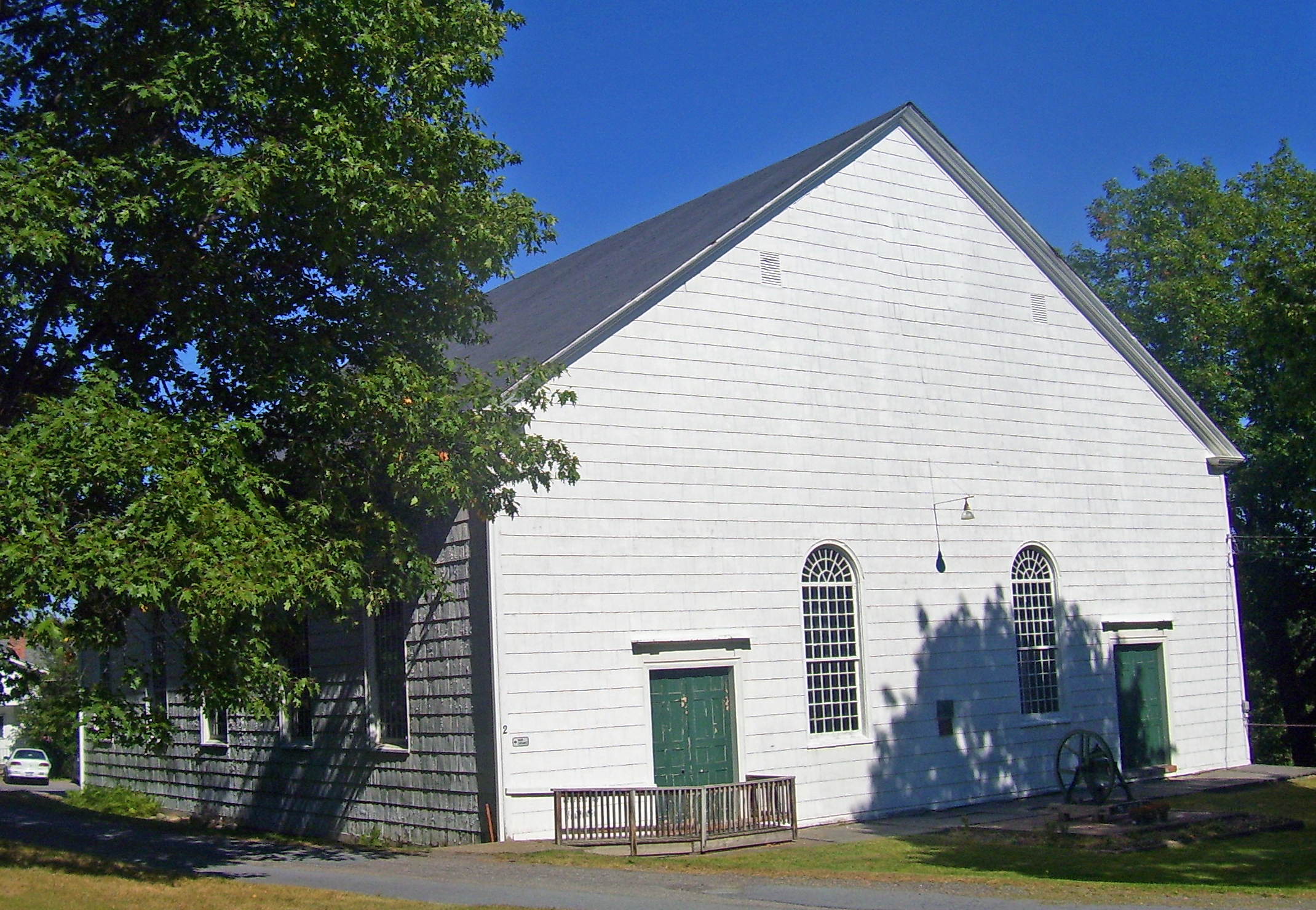
- Church in 2007

- Location within New York Location within the United States
- Location: W side of NY 94, jct. with Old Dominion Rd., Blooming Grove, New York
- Nearest city: Newburgh
- Coordinates: 41°24′12″N 74°11′55″W
- Built: 1824
- Architect: Joseph Cromwell
- Architectural style: Federal style
- NRHP reference No.: 96001434
- Added to NRHP: December 06, 1996

Blooming Grove United Church of Christ, also known just as Blooming Grove Church and formerly known as The Congregational Church of Blooming Grove, is located at the junction of Old Dominion Road and NY 94 in the town of Blooming Grove, between the villages of Chester and Washingtonville in Orange County, New York, United States. It is a plain white Federal style building, notable for lacking the steeple or cupola commonly found on churches.

== History ==
The church itself was formed in 1758 as a Presbyterian congregation. It had enough members that it was able to buy land for a meetinghouse the following year, the exact site of which is not known. Growth continued, and by 1823 it was necessary to expand.

The members decided that instead of expanding the existing structure they would sell it and buy new land for a new church with the proceeds. Shortly afterwards, the old building was razed. Only some of the interior woodwork has been preserved.

As was common at the time, construction also was financed by subscription: families would buy pews in their name, essentially making them partners in the church. The new building, designed by architect Joseph Cromwell, was 75 feet (23 m) by 63 feet (19 m). It had a sloping floor and box pews, with a gallery behind the pulpit. The builders used the king and queen post method of roof support, so that the sanctuary is completely open, with no interior pillars or columns obstructing anyone's view of the pulpit.

In another practice common at the time, pews were built along the side of the church for congregants' slaves. The walls were finished by a local plasterer who had perfected a putty-like look, the exact details of which he never revealed. It was finished and opened in 1824.

A decade later, the congregation broke with Presbyterianism after its then-pastor, James Arbuckle, was tried for heresy. It became a Congregational church, but did not rename itself as such until 1871.

The only major change to the interior of the church came in 1902, when locally raised industrialist David Moffat bought a pipe organ in memory of his father's service there as choirmaster. The addition caused considerable controversy within the congregation. One member went so far as to sue the church since his family's pew would have to be dismantled (the action was withdrawn).

In 1919, after World War I, the church dedicated a stained glass "Service Window" to honor Blooming Grove residents who had served in the military. Charles S. Whitman, then governor, came to the church to speak at the dedication ceremony.

The church arrived at its current denomination in 1957 when the Congregational Christian Churches merged with the Evangelical and Reformed Church and both became the United Church of Christ. In 1996 the building was added to the National Register of Historic Places, making it the first and so far only NRHP listing in the town.
