= Dave Cayemitte =

American soccer player and businessman

Personal information
- Place of birth: Haiti
- Position: Right-back

College career
Years	Team	Apps	(Gls)
1982–1985	Adelphi Panthers		

International career^{‡}
1984	United States	1	(0)
- ‡ National team caps and goals as of 25 April 2023

David Cayemitte is a former soccer player who is now the head of the Cayemitte Group, Inc, an insurance, surety bonding and risk management company. Born in Haiti, he represented the United States national team.

== Soccer ==
Cayemitte attended Adelphi University where he played on the men's soccer team from 1982 to 1985. He graduated with a bachelor's degree in finance. While still in college, Cayemitte earned one cap with the U.S. national team when he came on for Eddie Hawkins in a 2–2 tie with Ecuador on December 2, 1984.

== Business career ==
Cayemitte was hired by American International Group where he spent fourteen years. He rose through the company to become Vice President of National Union, a subsidiary of AIG. He then moved to St. Paul Travelers as a Regional Vice President. He then founded his own company, the Cayemitte Group which provides underwriting and management products to the insurance industry.
