= Indianapolis Monumental Marathon =

Annual marathon held in Indianapolis, Indiana, US

- Logo for the Indianapolis Monumental Marathon
- Date: November
- Location: Indianapolis, Indiana, United States
- Event type: Road
- Distance: Marathon, half marathon, 5K
- Primary sponsor: CNO Financial Group
- Established: 2008; 18 years ago
- Course records: Men: 2:12:28 (2025) (United States) Joe Whelan; Women: 2:35:36 (2023) (Canada) Rachel Hannah
- Website: monumentalmarathon.com
- Participants: 15,000 (2023)

The Indianapolis Monumental Marathon is an annual road marathon held in early November in Indianapolis, Indiana. The marathon was first held in 2008 and also includes a half marathon and 5K run. Since 2016, it has been the only full fall marathon run in Indianapolis. In 2025, there were 6,674 finishers and it is ranked one of the top 15 largest marathons in the U.S.

== History ==
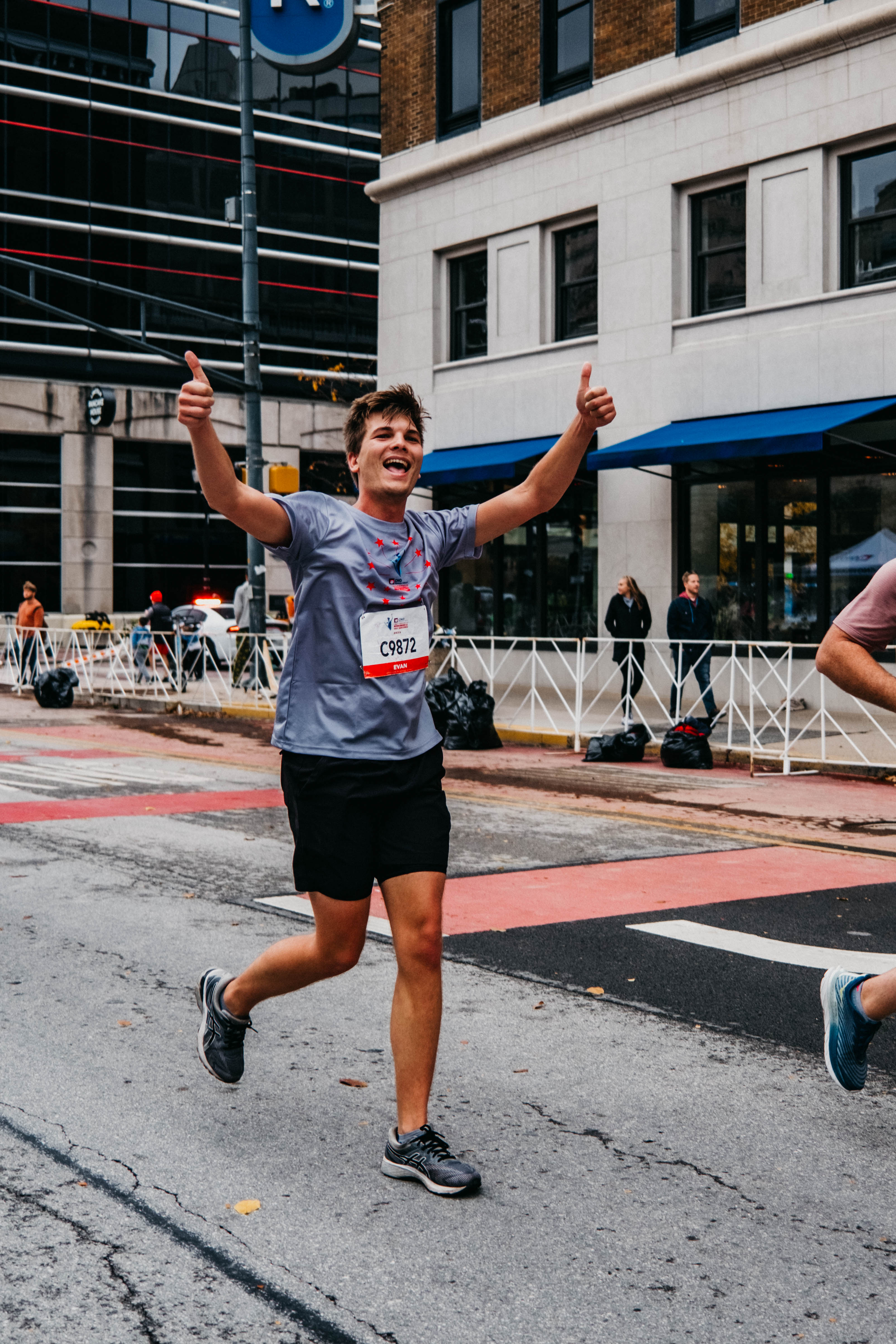
Runner nearing the finish of the Monumental Marathon

The Monumental Marathon was established by Carlton Ray in 2008. Just over 1,100 runners completed the race's inaugural running, while almost 2,000 completed the race the following year. Nearly 3,000 runners completed the half marathon in 2009. Beginning in 2010, a 5k race was offered as well. In 2014, Runners World named the race as one of the nine best, new U.S. marathons.

In 2015, the Monumental Marathon purchased the Indianapolis Marathon and converted it into a half marathon the following year, operating it as the Indy Half Marathon at Fort Ben. Prior to the purchase, the Monumental Marathon was reported to be in the top 25 marathons in the United States.

In 2016, the CNO Financial Group became the primary sponsor of the Monumental Marathon, which became known officially as the CNO Financial Group Indianapolis Monumental Marathon.

In 2017, Jed Cornforth was appointed as executive director of the event, replacing the prior director, Blake Boldon, who left the event to direct the Drake Relays.

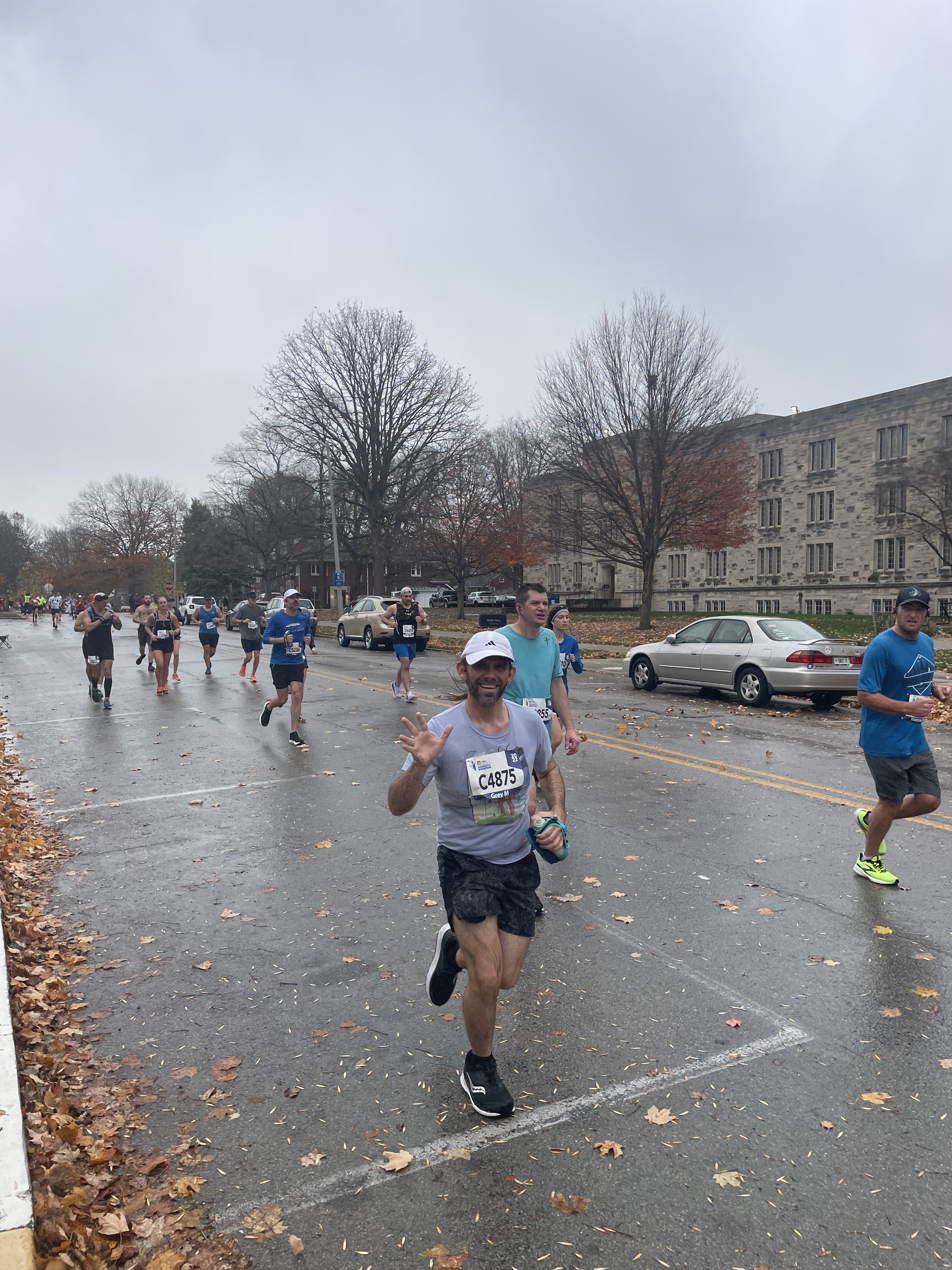
Runners on the Monumental Marathon course at Butler University.

The 2020 in-person edition of the race was cancelled due to the coronavirus pandemic, with all registrants given the option of running the race virtually or transferring their entry to 2021. An e-mail address was provided for registrants to request a refund, without any additional details regarding a refund policy.

== Course ==
The course for the Monumental Marathon begins and ends near the Indiana Statehouse in downtown Indianapolis. The Monumental Half Marathon is run concurrently with the full marathon. The two races follow identical routes for the first six or so miles, split, then re-converge for the last 3 mi (4.8 km) of the course.

The course is known to be relatively flat with good race day temperatures and strong crowd support, making the marathon a good PR and Boston Qualifier course.

== Winners ==
Key: Course record

Year	Male	Time	Female	Time	Rf.
2008	Richard Kandie	2:22:24	Zeddy Chepkoech	2:40:28	
2009	Mathew Chesang	2:21:00	Molly Brown-Boulay	3:07:28	
2010	Leornard Mucheru	2:17:58	Jackie Dikos	2:45:25	
2011	Hillary Cheruiyot	2:22:20	Mandy Grantz	2:42:36	
2012	Aleksey Alexandrova	2:18:44	Whitney Bevins-Lazzara	2:45:23	
2013	David Tuwei	2:16:40	Colleen Dereuck	2:39:22	
2014	Michael Eaton	2:19:38	Alana Hadley	2:38:34	
2015	Jesse Davis	2:17:59	Nicole Michmerhuizen	2:41:37	
2016	Japhet Kipkoech	2:18:30	Andie Cozzarelli	2:38:47	
2017	Japhet Kipkoech (2)	2:18:34	Laura Portis	2:41:35	
2018	Aaron Fletcher	2:17:23	Laurie Knowles	2:37:50	
2019	Nate Guthals	2:17:15	Dot McMahan	2:35:36	
2020	Event cancelled due to the COVID-19 pandemic				
2021	Ian Carter	2:16:24	Christina Murphy	2:37:57	
2022	Jacob Heslington	2:18:56	Jennifer Pope	2:37:22	
2023	Lyle O'Brien	2:15:39	Rachel Hannah	2:35:12	
2024	Austin Nolan	2:16:30	Lindsey Bradley	2:31:46	
2025	Joseph Whelan	2:12:28	Amanda Mosborg	2:32:00	
2026	Johnny Guy	2:11:45	Lindsey Bradley	2:29:43	

== See also ==
- Sports in Indianapolis
- List of attractions and events in Indianapolis
- List of marathon races in North America
