= Martin Hehir (runner) =

American distance runner (born 1992)

Personal information
- Born: December 19, 1992 (age 33)
- Home town: Washingtonville, New York, U.S.
- Education: Washingtonville High School; Syracuse University; Sidney Kimmel Medical College
- Occupation: Anesthesiologist

Sport
- Country: United States
- Event(s): Marathon, Half marathon
- College team: Syracuse Orange
- Team: Reebok

Achievements and titles
- Personal best(s): Marathon: 2:08:59; Half Marathon: 1:03:46; 10,000 meters: 27:57

Martin Robert Hehir (born December 19, 1992) is an American distance runner who specializes in the marathon. He placed 6th in the 2020 United States Olympic trials. Hehir also competed in the 2016 and 2024 U.S. Olympic trials. In addition to his running career, Hehir is a practicing physician specializing in anesthesiology.

== Early life ==
Hehir grew up in Washingtonville, New York, and attended Washingtonville High School. He starred in cross country, placing 14th at Nike Cross Nationals in 2010. Hehir stayed in New York for college and competed for Syracuse University, where he broke school records at the mile, 3,000 meters, and 10,000 meters. His personal-best time of 28:27 in the 10,000 meters qualified him for the NCAA Championship, where he earned second-team All-American honors. Hehir was also a leader of the 2015 NCAA Champion cross country team for the Orange. His 9th-place individual finish secured him All-American recognition. He was teammates with fellow marathoners Colin Bennie and Joe Whelan.

== Career ==
Hehir achieved notable results in 2016, his first full year as a professional, placing 6th in the USA 15 km Championship and 4th at the USA 10-mile Championship. In the 2016 United States Olympic trials, Hehir placed 7th in the 10,000 meters.

In 2018, he improved to 3rd place in the USA 15 km Championship. Hehir made his marathon debut in the fall of 2018 at the California International Marathon. His time of 2:13:49 was good enough for 9th in a national-class field, and it also qualified him for the 2020 United States Olympic trials in Atlanta.

Hehir returned to the USA 10-mile Championship in 2019, placing 4th in a time of 46:59. He followed that with one of the best performances of his career at the 2020 Olympic Trials Marathon, as he claimed 6th in a time of 2:11:29 on a hilly course.

He continued his success in the marathon later that year, winning the Marathon Project event in Arizona with a time of 2:08:59. At the time, this was the 7th-fastest marathon ever recorded by an American. Hehir achieved this result while balancing the demands of medical school and fatherhood. He often logged runs at 5 am, and then spent the day in the hospital treating patients in the height of the COVID-19 pandemic. At the time, he and his wife, Monica, were also raising a young daughter.

Hehir competed in the postponed 2020 United States Olympic trials in June 2021, finishing 20th in the 10,000 meters. Following the trials, Hehir took a step back from running to focus on his medical residency at the University of Virginia.

In the fall of 2023, Hehir returned to marathoning, clocking a time of 2:17:16 at the McKirdy Micro Marathon. This result qualified him for the 2024 United States Olympic Trials. In the Olympic Trials Marathon in Orlando, Hehir placed 58th of 200 men in hot, sunny conditions.

== Personal ==
As of September 2025, Hehir lives in Crozet, Virginia, with his wife and two daughters. He is an anesthesiologist at Augusta Health. His wife and mother are both nurses.
