= Naomi Sewell Richardson =

African-American suffragist

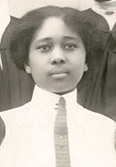
- Naomi Sewell Richardson in 1913
- Born: September 24, 1892; Lincoln University, Pennsylvania, US
- Died: August 5, 1993 (aged 100); Cornwall, New York, US
- Resting place: Washingtonville Cemetery (Washingtonville, New York)
- Education: Howard University, 1914
- Occupations: Educator, suffragist
- Employer: New York City Public Schools (1920-1947)
- Known for: One of the founders of Delta Sigma Theta

Naomi Sewell Richardson (September 24, 1892 – August 5, 1993) was an American educator and suffragist. She was a student co-founder of Delta Sigma Theta sorority, the second sorority founded for and by African-American women.

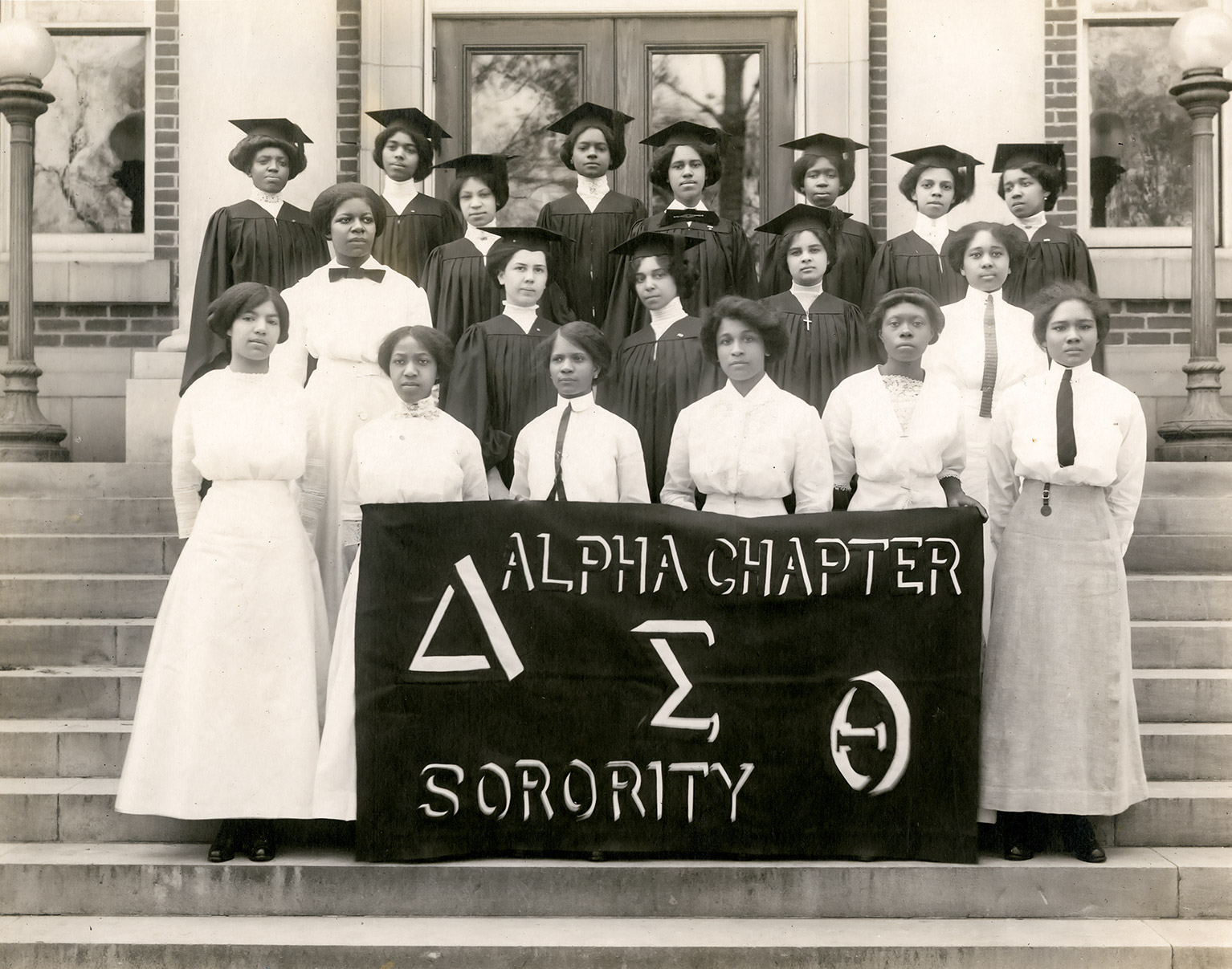
The founders of Delta Sigma Theta, including Naomi Sewell (second row, far right), in 1913

== Early life and education ==
Naomi Sewell Richardson was born on September 24, 1892, in Lincoln University, Pennsylvania. She was the third child born to Perry W. Sewell, a minister, and Florence Snowden Sewell. She was raised in Washingtonville, New York and, in 1910, was the first African American student to graduate from Washingtonville High School.

Richardson started at Howard University in 1910. Richardson, along with 21 of her classmates, co-founded the Delta Sigma Theta Sorority in 1913 with a stated goal of "want[ing] to do more for our community". All 22 founders joined the 1913 Woman Suffrage Procession, marching in their cap and gowns and enduring verbal and physical abuse from the larger crowd. According to Dr. Gwendolyn Boyd, a past president of Delta Sigma Theta, the "founders of Delta Sigma Theta were activists before that term was popular".

Richardson met her husband, Clarence, while a student at Howard. She graduated in 1914.

== Career ==
Upon graduation, Richardson taught elementary students in East St. Louis, Illinois, a segregated public school. Richardson was present during the East St. Louis race riots that occurred in 1917. After East St. Louis, Richardson moved to Princeton, New Jersey, teaching in another segregated school system. While in Princeton, Richardson successfully advocated for African American teachers to have their own bathroom facilities.

In 1920, Richardson moved to New York City and taught there until 1947. She remained actively involved with both the sorority and her community, and was "admired for her work with extreme activism and civic service".

== Death and legacy ==
Richardson was the last surviving founder of Delta Sigma Theta when she died at The Cornwall Hospital in 1993 at the age of 100, a centenarian.

A biography of her life was written by her sorority sisters in 1995 titled A Life of Quiet Dignity: Naomi Sewell Richardson.

The Naomi Sewell Richardson Park was built on the site of her original home in 2019.

== See also ==
- List of African American suffragists
- List of American suffragists
