= Dennis Smith (firefighter) =

American writer and firefighter (1940–2022)

- Born: September 9, 1940; New York City, U.S.
- Died: January 21, 2022 (aged 81); Venice, Florida, U.S.
- Occupations: FDNY Firefighter, writer
- Spouse: Patricia Kearney (m. 1962; div. 1985)
- Children: 5
- Writing career
- Genres: Memoirs, Firefighting Research
- Website: www.dennissmith.com

Dennis Edward Smith (September 9, 1940 – January 21, 2022) was an American firefighter and author. He was the author of 16 books, the most notable of which is the memoir Report from Engine Co. 82, a chronicle of his career as a firefighter with the New York City Fire Department in a South Bronx firehouse from the late 1960s and into the 1970s. Smith served for 18 years as a New York City firefighter, from 1963 to 1981, and was a well-known advocate for firefighters in the United States. Sometime in late 1969 or early 1970 he wrote a letter to the editor of the NY Times Book Review commenting on a piece about W.B. Yeats that had been written by Joyce Carol Oates (on Sept 7 1969). With a signature indicating he was a NYC fireman his letter caught notice by quite a few readers and The New Yorker then published an article about him in The Talk of the Town column (Susan Sheehan August 22, 1970.). After 9/11, he chronicled the 57 days he spent in rescue and recovery operations at the World Trade Center collapse in a bestselling book, Report from Ground Zero.

He died from complications of COVID-19 at a hospital in Venice, Florida, on January 21, 2022, at age 81.

== Early life and career ==
Dennis Edward Smith was born in the Bedford-Stuyvesant neighborhood of Brooklyn and grew up in a tenement on the East Side of Manhattan. His father, John, was a Scottish immigrant and was committed to a psychiatric hospital when Dennis was two. His mother, Mary (Hogan), was Irish American. She raised Smith and his brother after his father was committed. Smith was raised Catholic and went to parochial schools. He attend Cardinal Hayes High School before dropping out when he was fifteen. He was arrested for brawling but was spared by the judge if he joined the military; he served in the air force for three years. In 1963, Smith took the New York City Civil Service Test and became a firefighter in the New York City Fire Department. He was first assigned to Engine Company 292, a fire company in Queens. Three years later, in 1966, Smith transferred to the busiest fire company in the city, and perhaps the world at the time, Engine Company 82, located in the South Bronx. In the mid-1970s, shortly after his first book was published, Smith transferred to Engine Company 66 in the North Bronx. During the duration of his career, Smith lived with his family in the Orange County suburb of Washingtonville, New York, before moving to East 84th Street in New York City.

== Firehouse Magazine ==
In 1976, Smith founded Firehouse Magazine. The magazine became the journal of record for the American fire service and accorded Smith as its editor the opportunity to educate himself on most of the United States' emergency management concerns. He sold Firehouse in 1991 but continued as founding editor. At the time, Firehouse was a monthly trade magazine with a circulation of 120,000 and a readership of 700,000 within the community of firefighters. While serving as the editor and publisher of Firehouse, Smith also created the Firehouse Muster and Convention in Baltimore (now also in Nashville). He was presented with the Legacy Award of Firehouse Magazine in 2016.

== Civic life ==
Dennis Smith was a leader in New York City and national charitable organizations. He was the founding chairman of the New York Academy of Art. He was also the founding chairman of the New York City Fire Museum on Spring Street. From 1975 to 1995, he was president or chairman of the Kips Bay Boys and Girls Club in the Southeast Bronx, where 9000 children were members. He also served on the national board of advisors of Boys and Girls Clubs of America and was elected to that institution's prestigious "Hall of Fame". His bronze bust resides in the lobby of the BGCA's Atlanta headquarters.

Smith was a trustee of the New York Fire Foundation, a charity that supported special projects and the needs of fire commissioners. The foundation purchased pass alert devices for firefighters and computer services for firehouses, and was at the forefront of investigating the needs of firefighters and their departments. In 1991, he created the Foundation for the Health and Safety of American Firefighters with royalties from one of his books. The foundation supported health and safety efforts through grants to leading organizations in the fire service.

He was also a founding member of the Congressional Fire Services Institute, where he served as a board member, which is an organization created by an Act of Congress. It provides emergency service management information and conclusions to congress and has been honored by visits from presidents George W. Bush, Bill Clinton, Homeland Security head Tom Ridge, and many other congressional leaders.

For eight years after 9/11, Smith served as a trustee of the New York Police & Fire Widows and Children's Benefit Fund, a charity that benefits the families of firefighters and police officers killed in the line of duty.

== Awards ==
Smith's service to firefighters and his leadership in their causes have been recognized with numerous awards by the Congressional Fire Services Institute, the National Fire Academy, and the International Association of Fire Chiefs.

The International Association of Fire Chiefs award cited Smith:

For your accurate and colorful portrayal of the fire service in your books, for your vision in creating the Foundation for the Health and Safety of American Firefighters, and for your dedication to education by pioneering Firehouse Magazine.

== Education ==
Smith received a B.A. degree in English from New York University in 1970, and an M.A. in communications from NYU in 1972.

== Publications ==
Dennis Smith has written sixteen books in his career, among them:

- Report from Engine Co. 82
- Final Fire
- Glitter & Ash
- Steely Blue
- History of Firefighting in America
- The Aran Islands – A Personal Journey
- Firehouse (accompanying photographs by Jill Freedman)
- Dennis Smith's Fire Safety Book
- Firefighters – Their Lives in Their Own Words
- A Song for Mary
- Report from Ground Zero
- San Francisco Is Burning – The Untold Story of the 1906 Earthquake and Fires
- A Decade of Hope – Stories of Grief and Endurance from 9/11 Families and Friends
- Of Love and Courage

For children:

- The Little Fire Engine That Saved The City
- Brassy the Fire Engine
