= Washingtonville, New York =

- Village
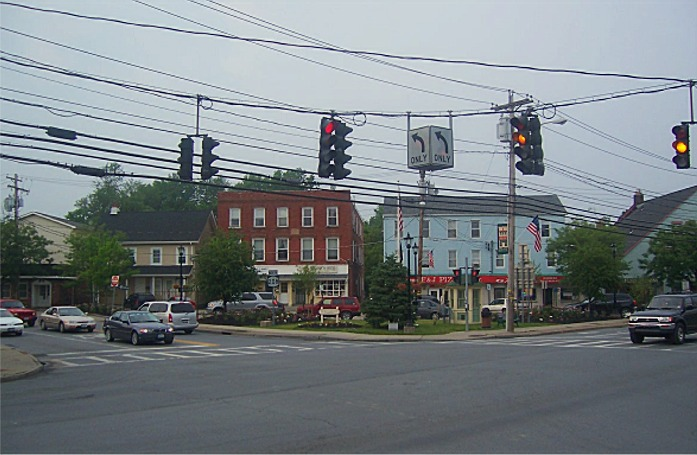
- Downtown Washingtonville

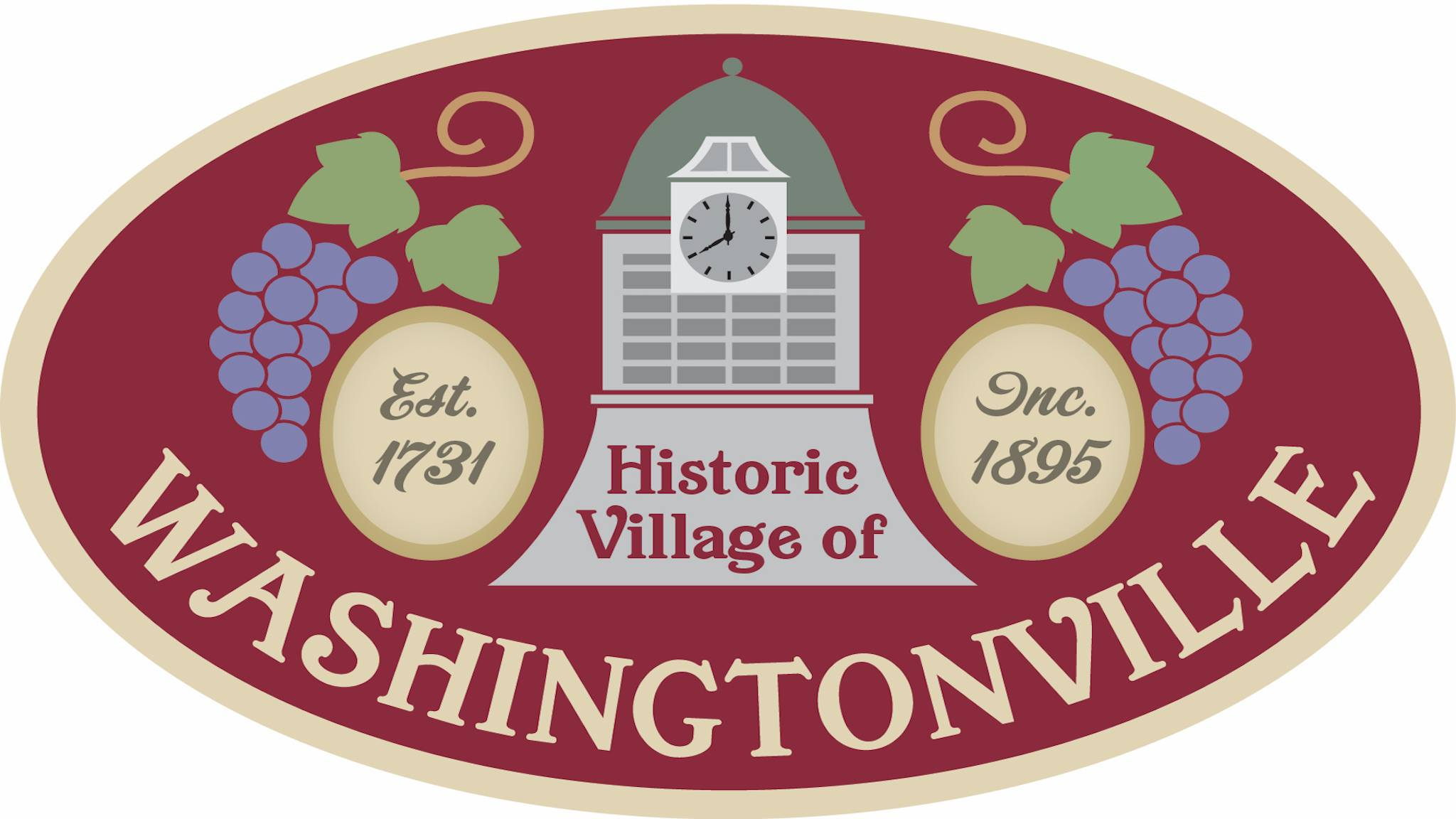

- Location in Orange County and the state of New York

- Location within the state of New York
- Coordinates: 41°25′40″N 74°09′58″W
- Country: United States
- State: New York
- County: Orange
- Town: Blooming Grove

Government
  - Type: Village Board with a Mayor and 4 Trustees
  - Mayor: Thomas Devinko

Area
  - Total: 2.55 sq mi (6.61 km^{2})
  - Land: 2.54 sq mi (6.57 km^{2})
  - Water: 0.015 sq mi (0.04 km^{2})
- Elevation: 305 ft (93 m)

Population (2020)
  - Total: 5,657
  - Density: 2,228.8/sq mi (860.54/km^{2})
- Time zone: UTC-5 (Eastern (EST))
  - Summer (DST): UTC-4 (EDT)
- ZIP Code: 10992
- Area code: 845
- FIPS code: 36-78465
- GNIS feature ID: 968876
- Website: www.washingtonville-ny.gov

Washingtonville is a village in the town of Blooming Grove, New York, United States. The population was 5,657 at the 2020 census. It is part of the Kiryas Joel–Poughkeepsie–Newburgh metropolitan area as well as the larger New York metropolitan area. The village is named in honor of George Washington.

== History ==
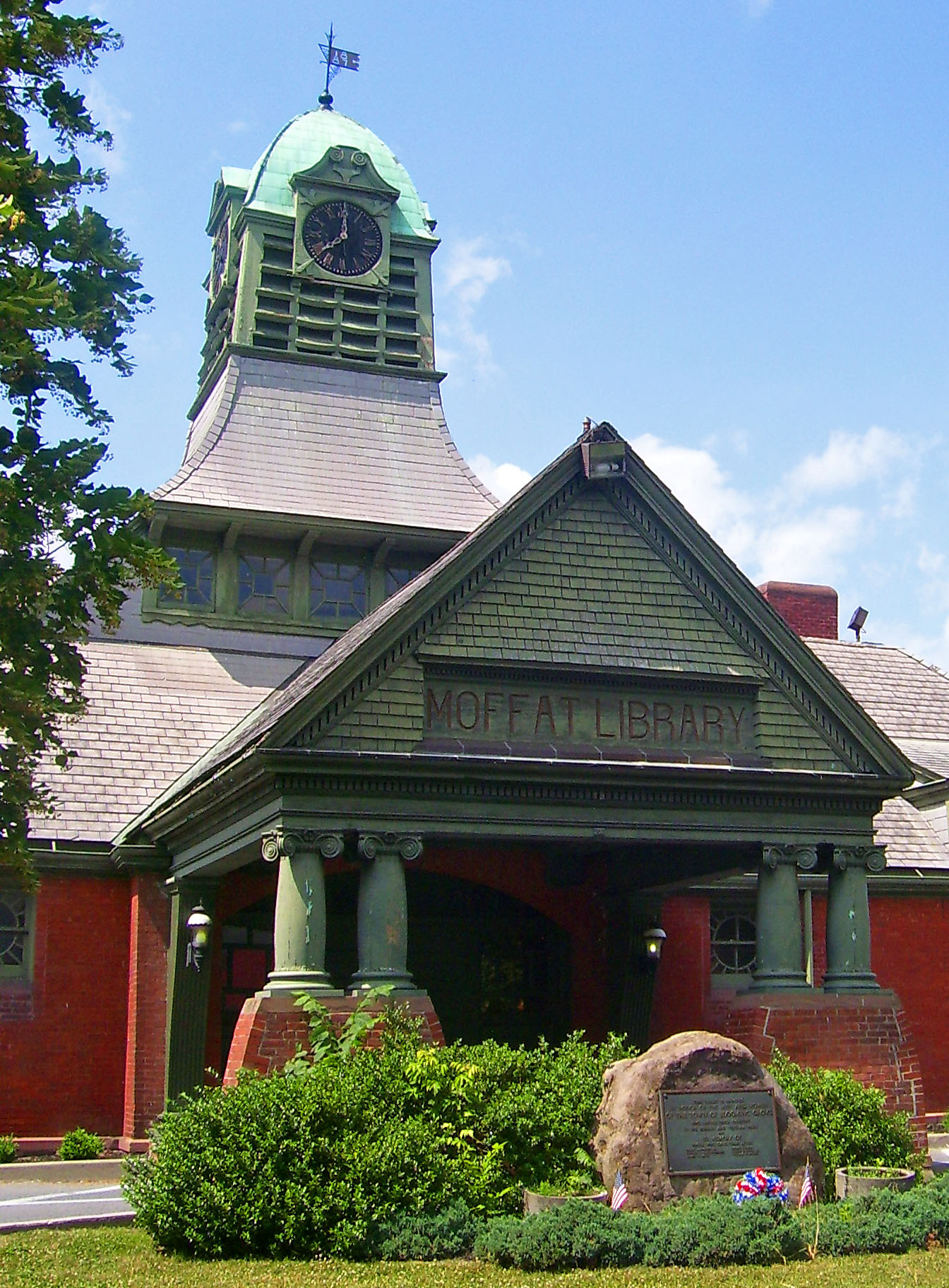
The Moffat Library, listed on the National Register of Historic Places, was built by Samuel Moffat's son David as a gift to his hometown

Washingtonville was first settled in 1731. The village maintained a slow but steady growth during the second half of the 18th century. In 1809, John Jaques, a boot and shoemaker, set up his shop in this tiny settlement of nine houses, then known as "Little York." In 1839 he established Brotherhood Winery, now the oldest continuously operating winery in the United States.

In its earlier years, Washingtonville was called "Matthews Field," even before it was known as Little York. A part of the Rip Van Dam patent, it was sold to Vincent Matthews in 1721. Matthews was the first white European settler of the region. Its earliest known inhabitant was an Indian by the name of Moringamus, whose wigwam or tepee was once pitched in back of where the Coleman bottled-gas plant is located now.

Samuel Moffat built a trading post on the village square in 1811 at the junction of the New Windsor and Blooming Grove Turnpike with the Goshen Road. His son David later endowed Moffat Library on the spot. The hamlet began to prosper with a tannery, grist and plaster mills. A hotel was needed and Samuel Moffat built his Washington Tavern in 1818. The same year Samuel and John Jaques bestowed the village with a new name, Washingtonville, in honor of the late general and first president of the United States. George Washington was said to have come through and watered his horse at the trough which had been located under an elm tree in the center of the village.

Washingtonville grew after 1850, when the New York, Lake Erie and Western Railway built its branch through the village. Incorporated in 1895, the village had become an important dairying center where two creameries, Borden's (later used as a bus garage for the Washingtonville Central School District) and the Farmers Cooperative Market on South Street, several groceries, a bank, feed and lumber dealers, wagon shops, furniture makers and a hub shop all prospered. Its greatest growth in that time occurred in the seventh and eighth decades.

C.R. Shons opened up a cooperative on Depot Street and also had a large orchard on Goshen Avenue. Thomas Fulton's grist mill was destroyed by fire in the early 1900s. Hugh Lunney had his slaughterhouse on Goshen Avenue, near where the Spear Printing Company plant was, and also had a large ice house beside the point to Coopers Creek, harvesting ice for commercial use from the pond in the winter.

Borden's Creamery maintained a bottling plant and its refrigerator cars, loaded with milk, were shipped to Greycourt (Harriman) on either the Erie freight or passenger runs. This firm cut its ice from the small pond south of its creamery, storing it in the ice house on the east side of the plant.

== Geography ==
According to the United States Census Bureau, the village has a total area of 2.54 square miles (6.6 km^{2}). The village developed on each side of Moodna Creek, a tributary of the Hudson River. It is prone to seasonal flooding. There are also three lakes in the village, none of these have a formal name.

Washingtonville is at the junction of highways NY-94 and NY-208.

== Demographics ==
Historical population
Census	Pop.	Note	%±
1890	691		—
1900	667		−3.5%
1910	631		−5.4%
1920	631		0.0%
1930	663		5.1%
1940	801		20.8%
1950	823		2.7%
1960	1,178		43.1%
1970	1,887		60.2%
1980	2,380		26.1%
1990	4,906		106.1%
2000	5,851		19.3%
2010	5,899		0.8%
2020	5,657		−4.1%
U.S. Decennial Census

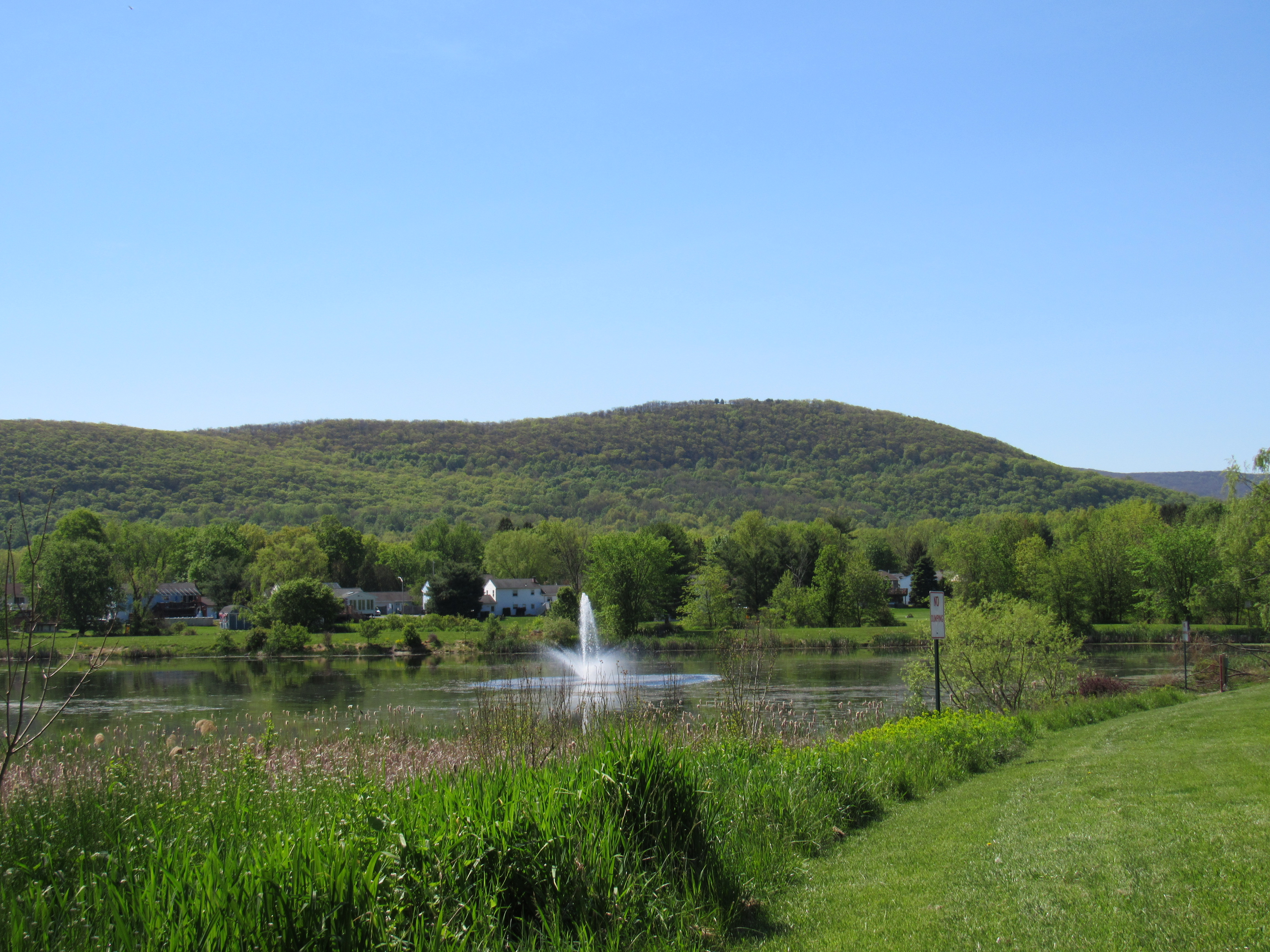
View facing south from Ahearn Boulevard looking towards the lakes and parks of Washingtonville.

As of the census of 2010, there were 5,899 people, 2,177 households, and 1,514 families residing in the village. The population density was 2,300.2 inhabitants per square mile (888.1/km^{2}). There were 2,044 housing units at an average density of 803.6 per square mile (310.3/km^{2}). The racial makeup of the village was 80.3% White, 8.22% African American, 0.46% Native American, 2.51% Asian, 6.15% from other races, and 2.36% from two or more races. Hispanic or Latino of any race were 18.27% of the population.

There were 2,177 households, out of which 35.9% had children under the age of 18 living with them, 55.5% were married couples living together, 17.4% had a female householder with no husband present, 9.2% had a male householder with no wife present and 30.5% were non-families. 26.6% of all households were made up of individuals, and 15.4% had someone living alone who was 65 years of age or older. The average household size was 2.71 and the average family size was 3.32.

In the village, the population was spread out, with 25.2% under the age of 18, 5.7% from 20 to 24, 22.7% from 25 to 44, 30.4% from 45 to 64, and 13.3% who were 65 years of age or older. The median age was 41.1 years. For every 100 females, there were 93.9 males. For every 100 females age 18 and over, there were 90.5 males.

The median income for a household in the village was $62,568, and the median income for a family was $69,145. Males had a median income of $57,552 versus $39,958 for females. The per capita income for the village was $24,036. About 1.6% of families and 3.7% of the population were below the poverty line, including 2.9% of those under age 18 and 12.0% of those age 65 or over.

== Parks and recreation ==
By the main intersection in the Village of Washingtonville, there is a yoga and dance studio. Theres also a corner candle store, a boutique, and Brotherhood Winery. There people can stomp on grapes, tour the wine cellars, and listen to live music while sampling their wines. The Village also hosts events on major holidays, especially Halloween and Christmas. The Village calls its Halloween celebration "Witchingtonville After Dark". This is when the down town stores host different Halloween activities, such as a haunted house. The Village also hosts a Christmas tree lighting on Christmas Eve. The event is called Whoville to celebrate the Christmas time and includes different vendors. Washingtonville also hosts movie nights, festivals, and has a local farmers market. Washingtonville has a yearly Fall Yard Sale and locals are able to use an interactive map of yard sales going on that day and socialize with other locals.

In 2010, an Autozone store opened on the main street in town. This Autozone was located right across Washingtonville Autoparts, which had been there for 25 years. This caused residents to uproar, making a petition against Autozone with over 2,000 signatures.The owner of Washingtonville Autoparts, Michael Cook, claims, " This has been a really good example of a community rallying together" Cook says. "Washingtonville has a cultlike following as far as loyalty to local businesses is concerned." says the president of the Greater Washingtonville Lion's club and owner of Brookside Auto & Tire, Chris Vohl.

On July 20, 2026 the Washingtonville Village Board voted to dedicate two village owned properties as parkland. The properties were named Newcastle Park and Mutna Park. One property is approximately 11 acres and the other is around 20 acres.

Washingtonville has a memorial dedicated to five firefighters from the community who died during the September 11 attacks.

== Government ==
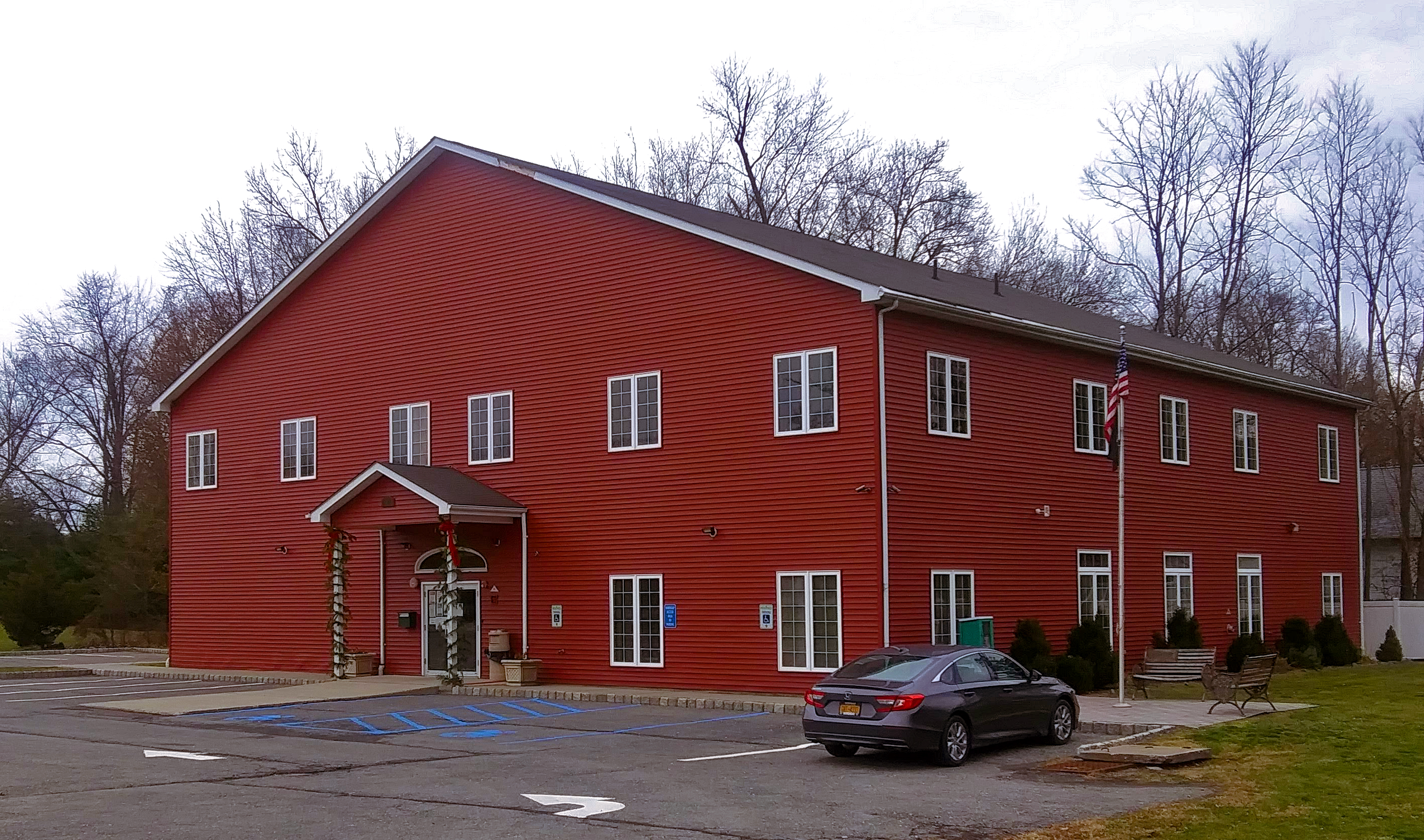
Washingtonville village hall in November 2022

The Village of Washingtonville consists of an Elected Mayor and five elected trustees that serve on a board. Elections are held every two years for these positions and those who serve must be village residents.

The village also has a Zoning, Planning, and Architectural Review Board. These consist of five appointed members each.

The Village collects its own taxes separate from that of the town. With these taxes it manages a department of public works, a water and sewer department, police department, municipal services, public parks, parking lots, and more.

== Education ==
It is in Washingtonville Central School District. Washingtonville Central School District is made up of five schools: Washingtonville High School, Washingtonville Middle School, Little Britain Elementary School, Taft Elementary School, and Round Hill Elementary School. Three of these are located in Washingtonville: the district's High School, Middle School, and Taft Elementary School.

Completed in 1933, the current Washingtonville Middle School housed all the grades of kindergarten through 12th grade. Little Britain was adjacent to Stewart Air Force Base, and was only for children whose parents were in the military. The air base has long since been closed, but military personnel are still housed in new housing units located just west of Little Britain Elementary. The high school has undergone several renovations, the last completed in 2010. In addition to adding on classrooms, three computer labs were also added, including a Mac Lab.

== Infrastructure ==
=== Police ===
The Village Of Washingtonville Police Department was formally founded as per the village code in late 1974. They settled into their current headquarters located in the old Monell Engine Company fire station. Prior to this the police department was stationed out of a small booth located in the center of the Village. The booth has been restored and sits where it first was in the center of a traffic circle. The first officer for the department was formally appointed in 1929. The first chief of police would be hired in 1932.

Today the department consist of 20 full and part time officers as well as 4 dispatchers / clerks and 1 crossing guard. Of these 20 officers, there is one chief, three sergeants, two detectives, and a K9 unit. The village police dog is named Jax, after John Jaques founder of the Brotherhood Winery.

== Notable people ==
- Brian Cashman, general manager of the New York Yankees
- Tony Gilroy, writer and director
- Martin Hehir, distance runner
- James Mangold, director and screenwriter
- Luke Manley, internet personality and actor
- Scott Pioli, National Football League executive
- Naomi Sewell Richardson, founder of Delta Sigma Theta, one of the oldest African American Sororities in the United States
- Dennis Smith, FDNY firefighter and author.
