= Hall's Tavern =

Hall's Tavern may refer to:

- Hall Tavern, Cambridge, Massachusetts, listed on the National Register of Historic Places (NRHP)
- Hall's Tavern (Cheshire, Massachusetts), NRHP-listed
- Hall's Tavern (Falmouth, Maine), listed on the NRHP in Cumberland County, Maine
