= Nathan Harris House =

Historic house in Maine, United States

- U.S. National Register of Historic Places
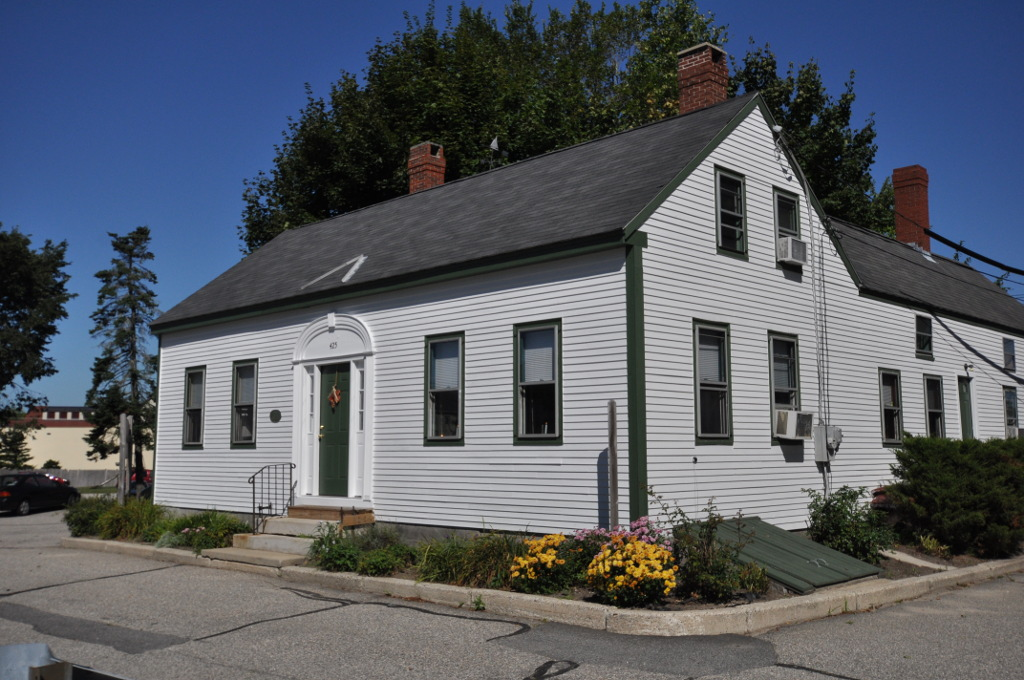

- Location within Maine Location within the United States
- Location: 425 Main St., Westbrook, Maine
- Coordinates: 43°40′53″N 70°20′55″W
- Area: less than one acre
- Architect: Hamblen & Prior
- Architectural style: Federal
- NRHP reference No.: 93001116
- Added to NRHP: October 14, 1993

The Nathan Harris House is an historic house at 425 Main Street in Westbrook, Maine. Built about 1830, it is a well-preserved example of Federal period architecture, most notable for the murals painted on some of its walls in the 1830s. It was listed on the National Register of Historic Places in 1993. The house is now used as a professional office.

== Description and history ==
The Harris House is located in a commercial area east of downtown Westbrook, in a large island of buildings surrounded by Cumberland Street, Main Street, and Harnois Avenue. The house is located near the eastern end of this island, next to the late 19th-century Warren Block. The house is a 1 1/2-story wood-frame structure, with a five-bay front section and a cross-gabled ell extending to the rear. The front is symmetrical, with the center entrance adorned by sidelight windows and pilasters, with a semi-oval fan above. The interior retains Federal period woodwork in the parlor spaces that is of unusually high quality for what was at the time a comparatively modest setting. The main hall and right-side parlor both have oil-painted murals on the walls. Comparative analysis of these murals with similar works of known attribution suggests they were the work of either Sturtevant J. Hamblen or William Matthew Prior, both of whom produced works in the Portland area in the 1830s.

The house was built c. 1828–30, and is a rare surviving example of a modest merchant's home of the period, a type of house that would have been quite common at the time. In the 20th century the building was repurposed as a law office, given the increasingly commercial surroundings. The murals were undergoing restorative work at the time the building was listed on the National Register in 1993.

== See also ==
- National Register of Historic Places listings in Cumberland County, Maine
