= John and Maria Webb House =

Historic house in Maine, United States

- U.S. National Register of Historic Places
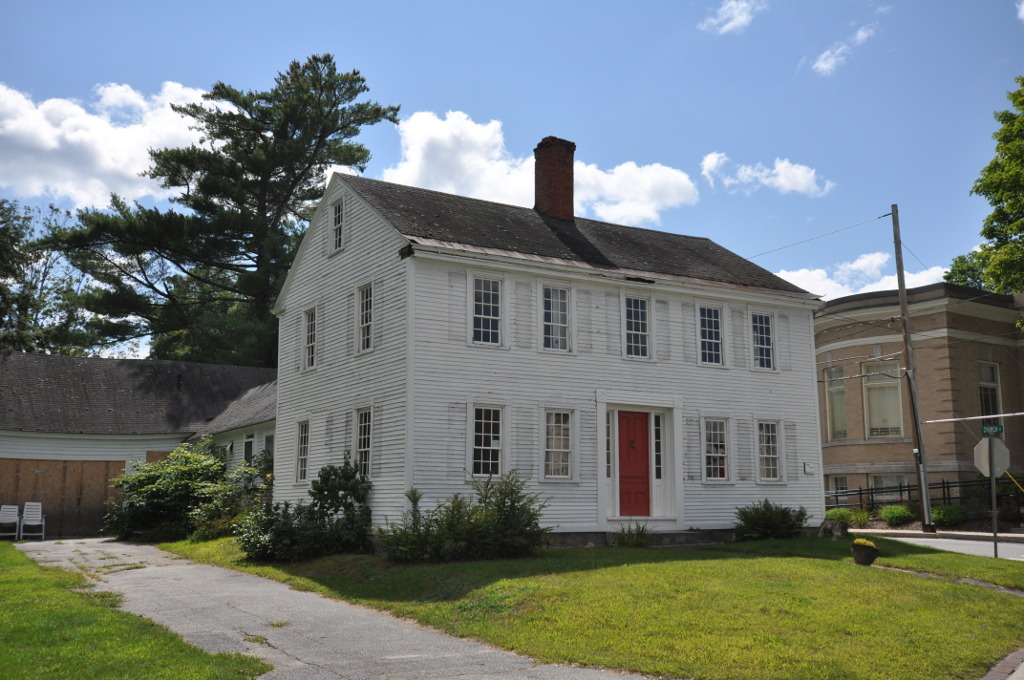

- Location within Maine Location within the United States
- Location: 121 Main St., Bridgton, Maine
- Coordinates: 44°03′15″N 70°42′34″W
- Built: 1842
- NRHP reference No.: 13000834
- Added to NRHP: October 16, 2013

The John and Maria Webb House is an historic house at 121 Main Street in the center of Bridgton, Maine, United States. Built in the first half of the 19th century, it is a rare surviving residential property on the town's main street that was never adapted for commercial use. It was listed on the National Register of Historic Places in 2013.

== Description and history ==
The Webb House stands near the very center of Bridgton's commercial Main Street, on the south side of Main Street, between the Bridgton Public Library and Stevens Creek. It is a 2 1/2-story wood-frame structure, with a gabled roof, wooden clapboard siding, and a granite foundation. It is stylistical Federalist, with some Greek Revival elements. It has narrow trim at the corners and around the windows, and a comparatively elaborate recessed entry, with sidelight windows in the recess, and framing pilasters and entablature around the recess. The interior follows a center chimney plan, and features a mix of original Federal and Greek Revival trim elements. A single-story ell extends from the rear of the house.

The oldest portion of the Webb House is probably its ell, which was built at an unknown date, but was probably standing when the property was purchased by John Webb in 1840. In 1841-42 the house achieved most of its present appearance. It is one of a small number of buildings in Bridgton with Federal period elements. Its setting, on Main Street, was at the time of a mix of residential, commercial, and industrial uses (the latter dominating by tanning and mills on nearby Stevens Brook), but is now almost entirely commercial and retail.

== See also ==
- National Register of Historic Places listings in Cumberland County, Maine
