= Universalist Meeting House =

Historic church in Maine, United States

- U.S. National Register of Historic Places
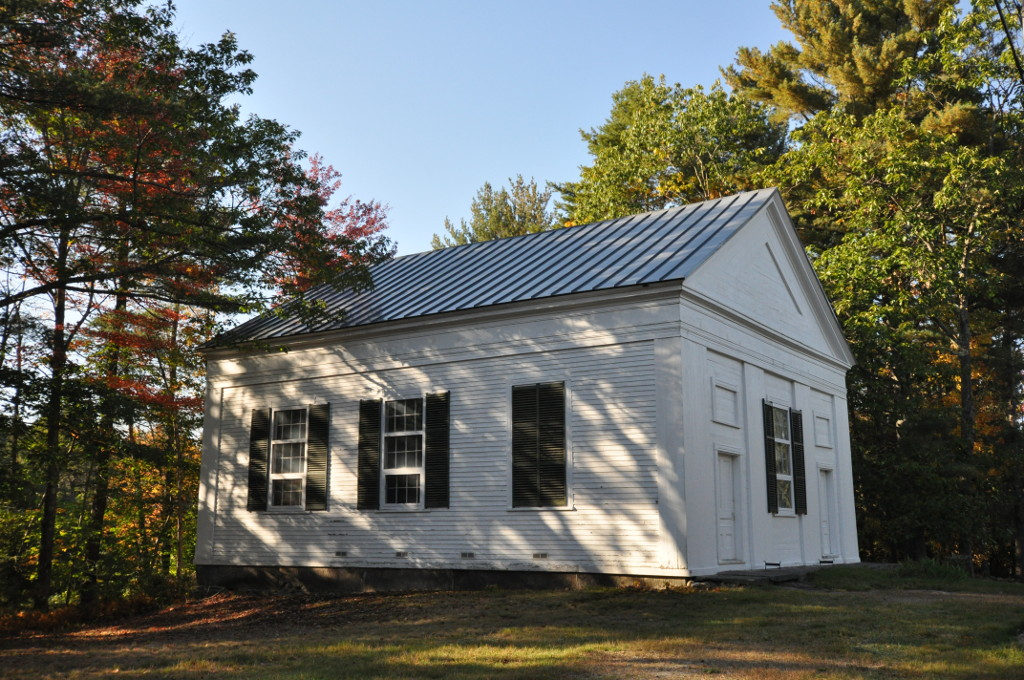

- Location within Maine Location within the United States
- Location: SR 231, New Gloucester, Maine
- Coordinates: 43°55′24″N 70°14′54″W
- Area: less than one acre
- Built: 1839
- Architect: Cotton, Jeremiah
- Architectural style: Greek Revival
- NRHP reference No.: 88000887
- Added to NRHP: June 23, 1988

The Universalist Meeting House is a historic church on Maine State Route 231 in the Intervale area of New Gloucester, Maine. Built in 1839, it is a fine example of a Greek Revival church in a rural context. It was listed on the National Register of Historic Places in 1988.

== Description and history ==
The Universalist Meeting House stands on a rural stretch of SR 231 in southern New Gloucester, on the west side of the road, a short way north of its junction with Dougherty Road. It is a single-story wood-frame structure, with a gabled roof, clapboard siding, and granite foundation. It has no tower. The building corners are pilastered, rising to an entablature that encircles the building. The front gable is fully pedimented, with molded trim and a flushboarded central tympanum. The main facade has a pair of entries flanking a central window. Each entrance is framed by simple molded surrounds, and have separately-framed multipane windows above (now protected by wooden boards). The doors open into separate vestibules, with stairs leading up to a gallery level, and entrances to side aisles in the nave. The nave floor slopes downward slight, ending in a raised sanctuary area. The pews are original.

The church was built in 1839 for a Universalist congregation established in 1805. The congregation was always financially troubled, but experienced occasional revivals until finally declining in the 1950s. The building was acquired by the local historical society in 1969.

== See also ==
- National Register of Historic Places listings in Cumberland County, Maine
