= Dunstan Methodist Episcopal Church =

Historic church in Maine, United States

- U.S. National Register of Historic Places
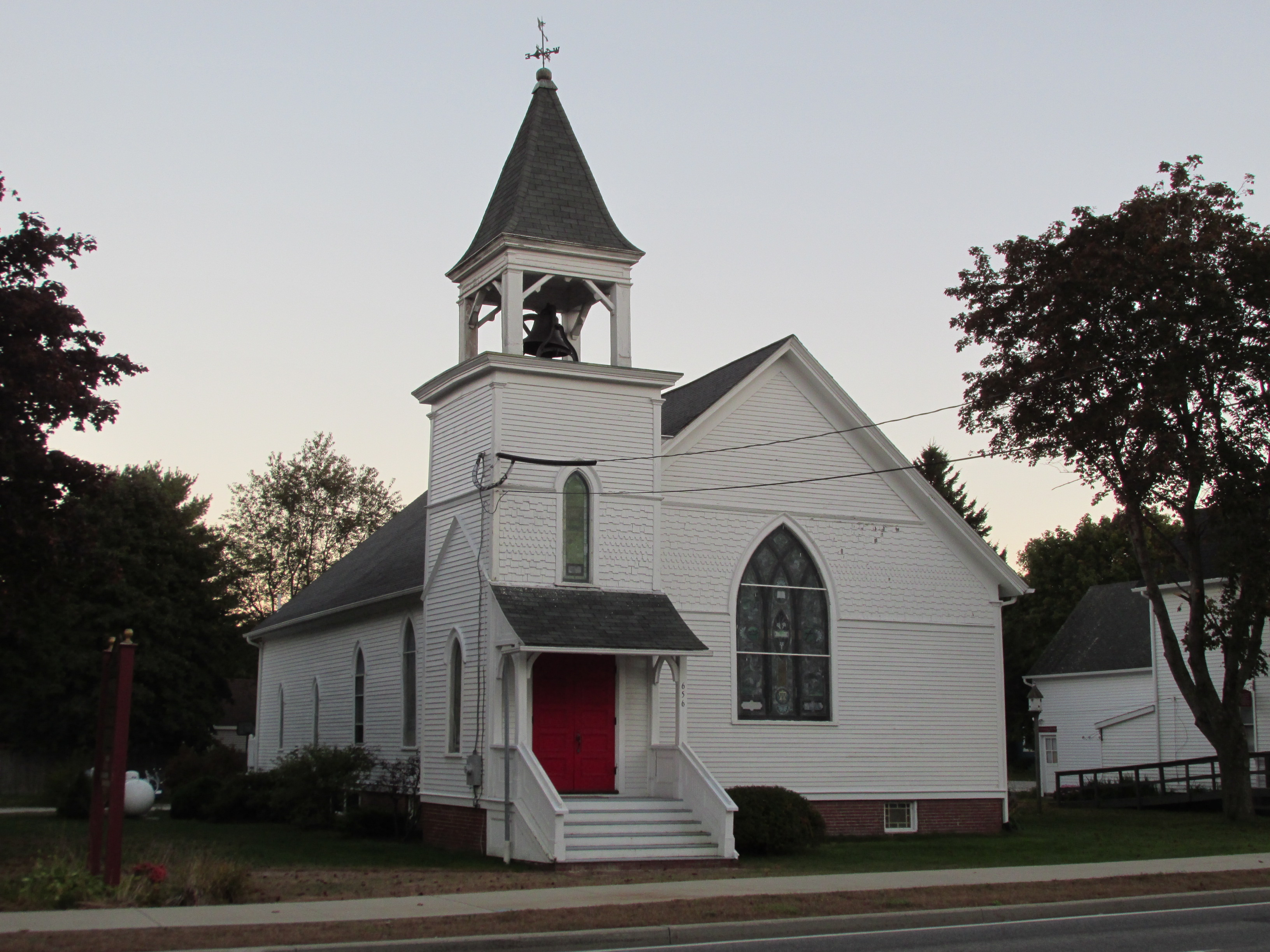
- Dunstan Methodist Episcopal Church

- Location within Maine Location within the United States
- Location: US 1, Scarborough, Maine
- Coordinates: 43°34′2″N 70°23′27″W
- Area: less than one acre
- Built: 1907
- Architect: Cochrane, Harry H.
- Architectural style: Queen Anne
- NRHP reference No.: 89000839
- Added to NRHP: July 13, 1989

The West Scarborough United Methodist Church, also known as the Dunstan Methodist Episcopal Church, is a historic church on U.S. Route 1 in Scarborough, Maine. The church building, built in 1839 and extensively altered in 1907, is one of the few surviving works of Maine architect and artist Harry Hayman Cochrane. The building was listed on the National Register of Historic Places in 1989 for its architectural significance.

== Description and history ==
The West Scarborough United Methodist Church is located in southern Scarborough, on the south side of US 1, between Orchard and Church Streets. It is a basically rectangular single-story wood frame structure, with a front-facing gable roof and an exterior finished clapboard and wood shingle siding. The front facade, facing north toward US 1, has a single large lancet-arch window at the center of the gabled nave section, and a slightly project square tower at the northeast corner. The tower houses the main entrance, sheltered by a shed-roof porch accessed by a low flight of wooden stairs, with a narrow lancet-arch window above and open belfry capped by a pyramidal roof. The east wall of the nave has five lancet-arch windows, of varying sizes, and the west wall has three symmetrically placed windows. The parish house extends from the southwest corner. The building interior has stained wainscoting on the walls, topped by pressed metal walls and ceiling. A raised platform extends from the chancel into the nave, housing space for the choir and organ, and curved rows of pews line the main space of the nave.

The church congregation was established in 1802, and initially met in an abandoned Congregational church. This church, the second built by the congregation, was built in 1839 as a Greek Revival structure. In 1907 the congregation undertook a major renovation of the building, retaining Monmouth, Maine-based architect and artist Harry Hayman Cochrane. Cochrane was a prolific designer, and is believed to have worked on an estimated 300-500 commissions. This church is one of only nine known to survive, and is the only one outside Monmouth. Alterations to the building included changing the roof to a steeper pitch, adding the tower, and replacing sash windows with Gothic stained glass. The interior walls, which might otherwise have had murals painted by Cochrane, may have been finished in metal as a cost-saving measure.

== See also ==
- National Register of Historic Places listings in Cumberland County, Maine
