= Sam Perley Farm =

Historic house in Maine, United States

- U.S. National Register of Historic Places
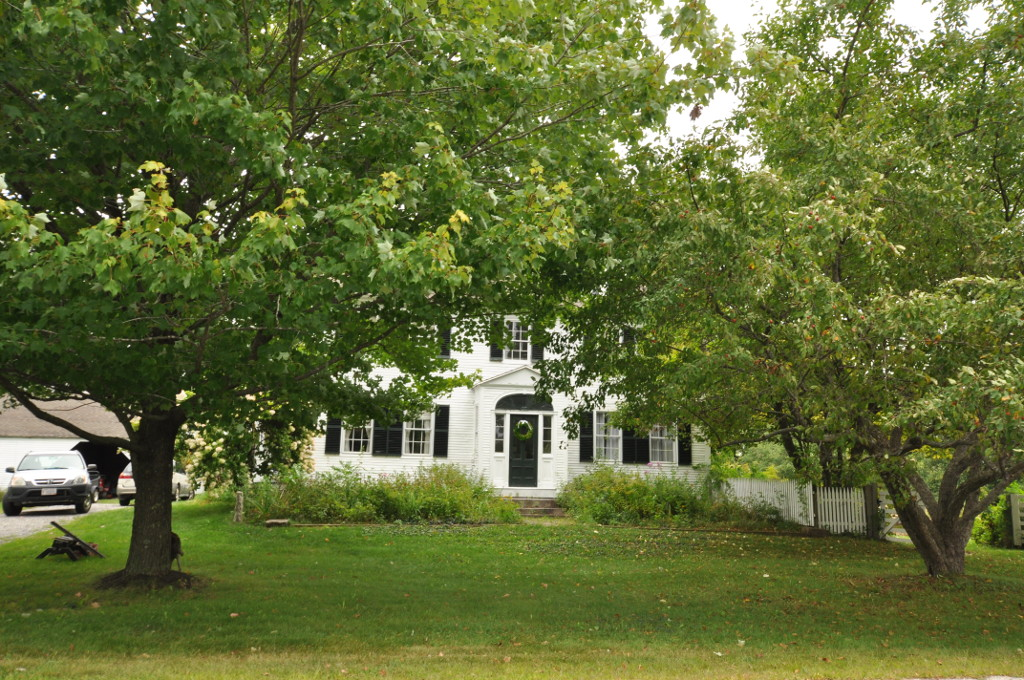

- Location within Maine Location within the United States
- Location: Perley Rd., Naples, Maine
- Coordinates: 43°59′9″N 70°39′47″W
- Area: 2 acres (0.81 ha)
- Built: 1809
- Architect: Perley, Thomas
- Architectural style: Federal
- NRHP reference No.: 79000143
- Added to NRHP: July 10, 1979

The Sam Perley Farm is a historic farmstead on Perley Road in Naples, Maine. Built in 1809, it is a well-preserved local example of Federal period architecture, and is historically notable for its long association with the prominent Perley family. The farmstead includes a carriage house, wellhouse and barn, all of 19th century origin. The property was listed on the National Register of Historic Places in 1979.

== Description and history ==
The Perley Farm complex is located in northwestern Naples, on the north side of Perley Road. The assemblage includes a large wood-frame house, with attached ell and carriage barn, a detached barn, and a wellhouse. The main house is a 2 1/2-story wood frame Federal style structure, with a gable roof, central chimney, clapboard siding, and granite foundation. It has a five bay front facade, with a projecting central gabled entrance vestibule (architecture). A 2 1/2-story ell, also with chimney, extends to the rear. Attached to the ell is the 1 1/2-story shed-roof carriage house. The main house's roof has dormers that appear to be Greek Revival, and there is a later Italianate window bay on the east end.

The house was built in 1809 by Thomas Perley, whose ancestor (also named Thomas) was one of the original proprietors of the town of Bridgton (from which Naples was later divided) in 1763. Thomas' father Squire Enoch Perley was one of Bridgton, Maine's first settlers. Thomas' son Samuel (1817–1881) was a prominent local citizen, serving as president of the county agricultural society, and in the state legislature. He was also one of the founding trustees of the school that later became the University of Maine, and was well known in the state at the time of his death.

== See also ==
- National Register of Historic Places listings in Cumberland County, Maine
