= Pennell Institute =

- U.S. National Register of Historic Places
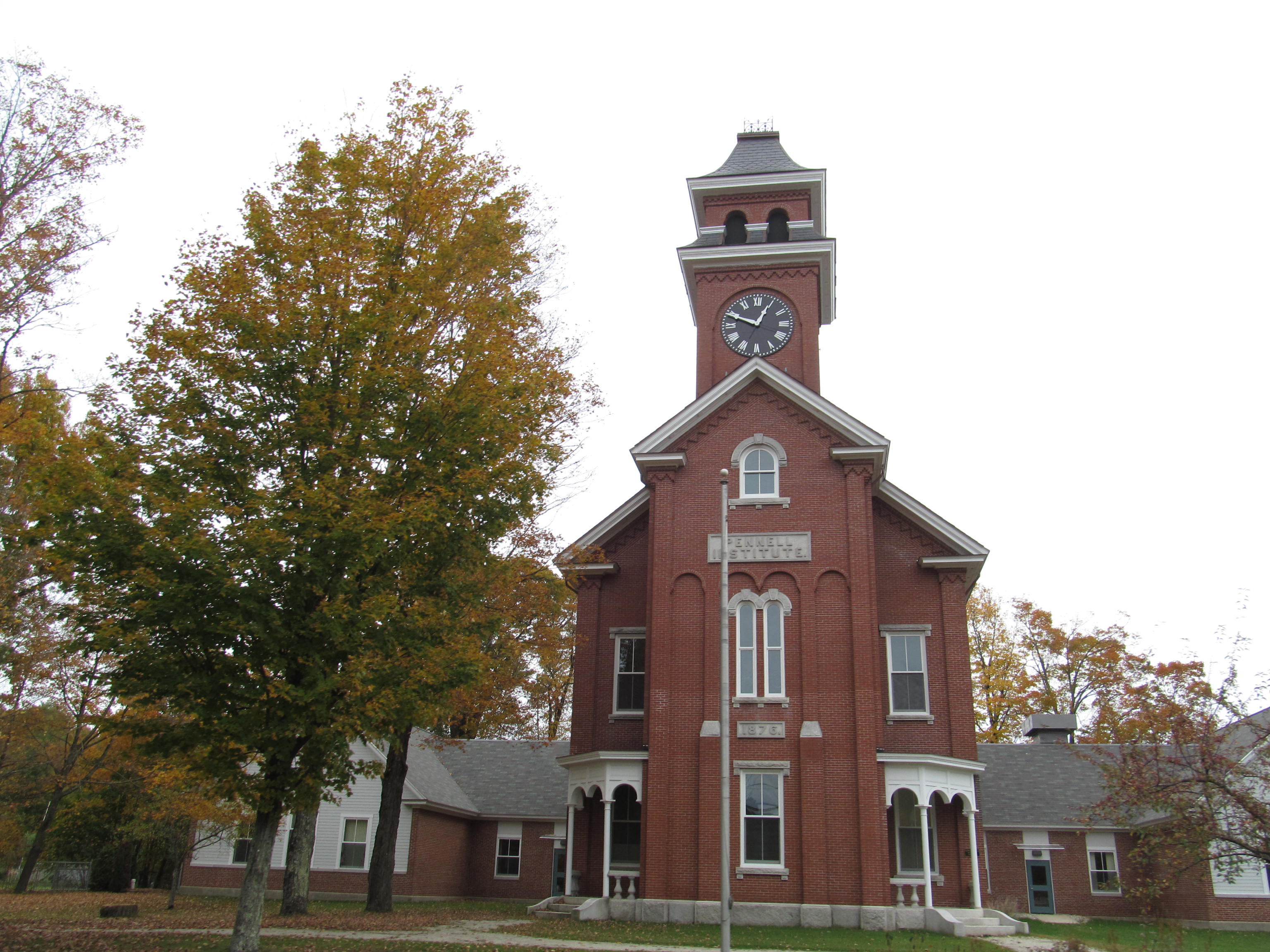

- Location within Maine Location within the United States
- Location: Lewiston Rd., Gray, Maine
- Coordinates: 43°53′16″N 70°19′41″W
- Area: 1 acre (0.40 ha)
- Built: 1876
- Architect: Goff, Henry
- Architectural style: Italianate
- NRHP reference No.: 82000750
- Added to NRHP: July 12, 1982

The Pennell Institute is a historic government building at 24 Main Street in Gray, Maine. Built 1876–86 as a gift to the town by Henry Pennell, it housed the town high school for many years, and now houses municipal offices. A fine example of institutional high style Italianate architecture, it was listed on the National Register of Historic Places in 1982.

== Description and history ==
The former Pennell Institute building is located in Gray's village center, on the south side of Main Street (US Route 202). It is a 2-1/2 story brick building with a gable roof and tower. A tall 2-1/2 story gabled section projects from the front, with single-story porches on either side, sheltering the original entrances. The front of the projection has corner pilasters, round-arch recessed panels, narrow round-arch windows, a wider round-arch window at the gable, and decorative brickwork at the cornice. The tower above features a clock, set in a round-arch panel, topped by a flared cornice, belfry, and a crested and flared truncated pyramidal roof. The building's sides are five bays long, defined by round-arch recessed panels two stories in height. Windows here, as on the front, have bracketed stone hoods and sills. A modern ell extends to the rear, with wings out to its sides. Set south of the main building is the former laboratory building, built later but stylistically sympathetic to the original.

The town of Gray has offered high school education since the early 19th century, but it was poorly organized for many years. By 1870 the need for a proper high school, with a permanent full-time staff was evident. Henry Pennell, then the town's wealthiest resident, promised to build the town a high school. Work was begun on this building was begun in 1876, but construction languished, and it was still incomplete in 1884, when Pennell died. In his will, he bequeathed additional funds to complete the building, including an endowment for maintenance and bequests for the library and laboratory. The building was finally completed in 1886, and graduated its first class three years later.

The building now houses municipal offices.

== See also ==
- National Register of Historic Places listings in Cumberland County, Maine
