= Winn Road School =

- U.S. National Register of Historic Places
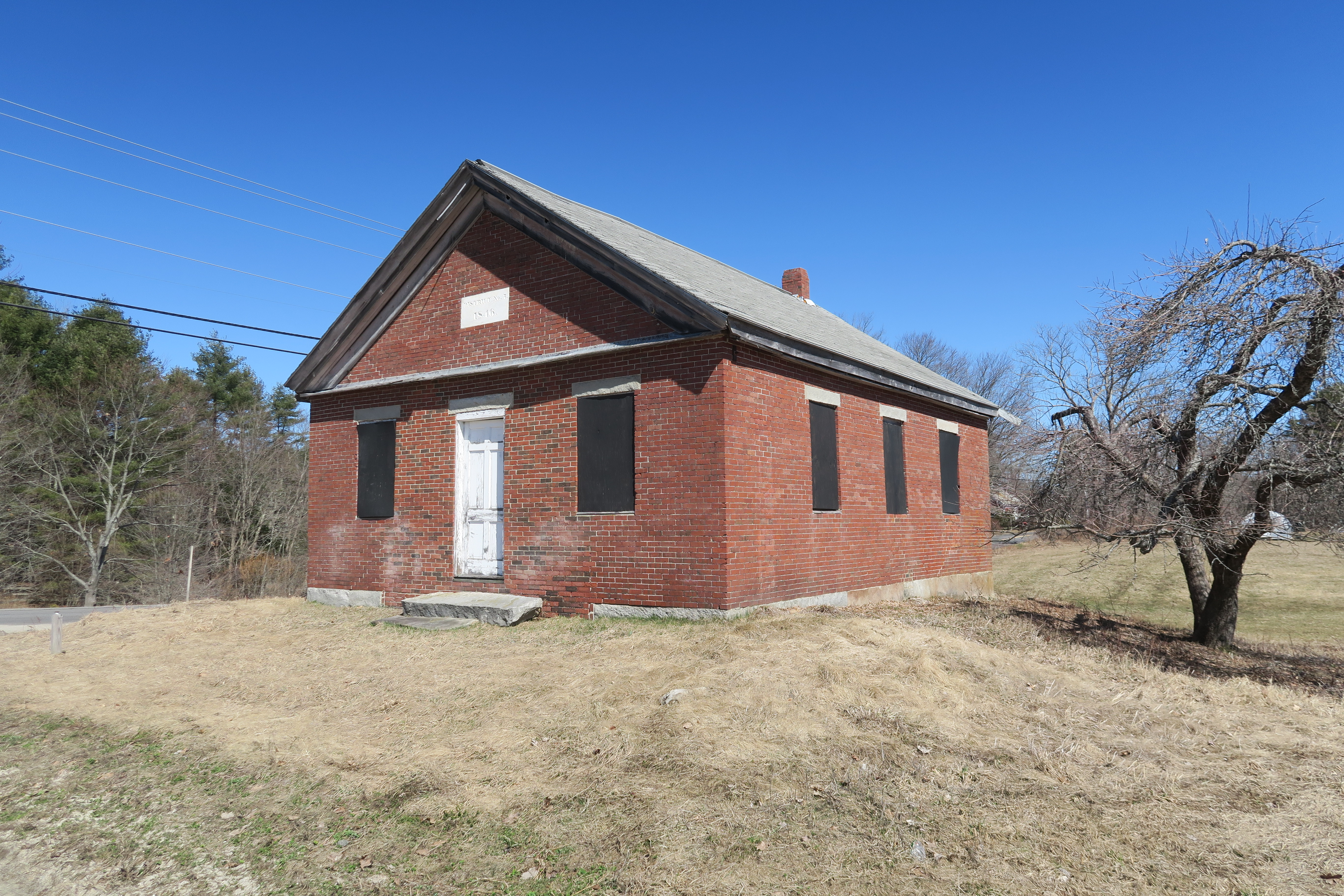
- Winn Road School

- Location within Maine Location within the United States
- Nearest city: Cumberland Center, Maine, U.S.
- Coordinates: 43°46′41″N 70°15′37″W
- Area: 0.3 acres (0.12 ha)
- Built: 1846 (180 years ago)
- Architectural style: Greek Revival
- NRHP reference No.: 84001364
- Added to NRHP: March 22, 1984

The Winn Road School is a historic school building located at the junction of Winn and Range Roads in Cumberland, Maine, United States. Built in 1846, it is one of only two known surviving brick Greek Revival one-room schoolhouses in the state. The building was added to the National Register of Historic Places in 1984.

== Description and history ==
The school's façade, which faces southwest

The Winn Road School stands amidst fields in a rural area of southern Cumberland, on the east side of the junction of Winn and Range Roads. The building is a single-story brick structure with a gabled roof and granite foundation. Its main façade faces southwest toward Range Road and features a fully pedimented gable with a date block at the center, flanked by sash windows below the door. The wall openings for the door and windows are framed by granite lintels. Each side elevation features three sash windows, while the rear has two windows on the ground floor and a third at the attic level, which is now boarded over. While the interior has undergone significant alterations over the years, it has retained a sloping floor, which is an unusual feature for schools of that period.

Constructed in 1846, the school was one of two similar buildings erected by the town at that time. The other building still stands but has been significantly altered. The school served as an educational facility until the early 20th century and was later repurposed for other civic uses.

In December 2022, a fire severely damaged the building. A fundraising campaign was subsequently launched to help cover the repair costs.

== See also ==
- National Register of Historic Places listings in Cumberland County, Maine
