= Dyer–Hutchinson Farm =

- U.S. National Register of Historic Places
- U.S. Historic district
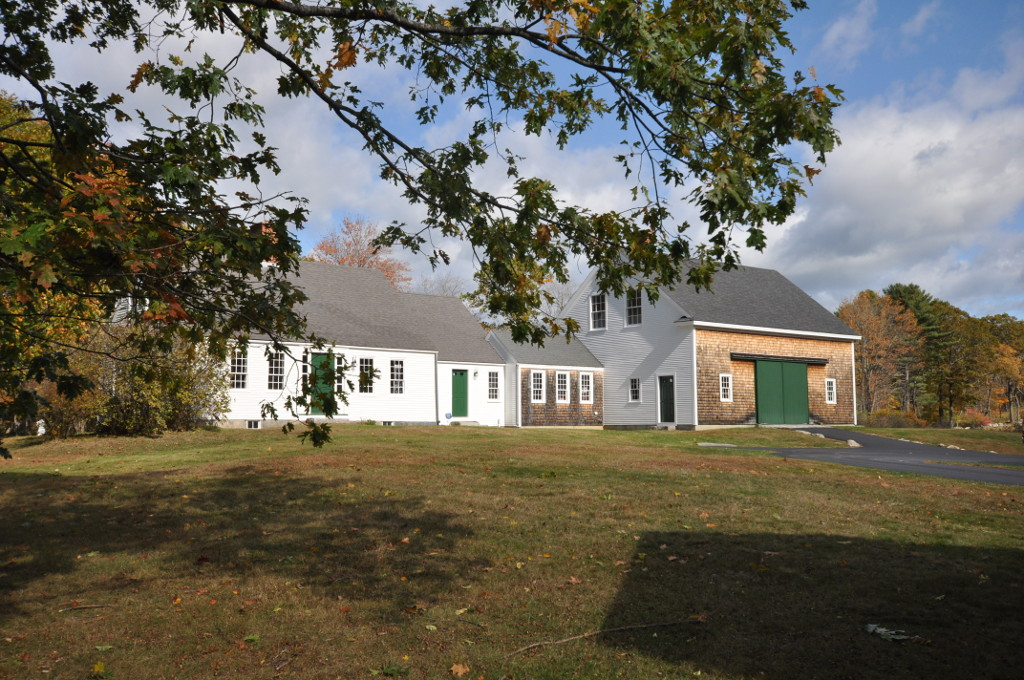

- Location within Maine Location within the United States
- Location: 1148 Sawyer Rd., Cape Elizabeth, Maine
- Coordinates: 43°36′18″N 70°15′48″W
- Area: 50 acres (20 ha)
- Built: 1793
- Architectural style: Federal
- NRHP reference No.: 97000313
- Added to NRHP: April 14, 1997

The Dyer–Hutchinson Farm is a historic farm property at 1148 Sawyer Road in Cape Elizabeth, Maine. Established about 1790, it is one of the few surviving 18th-century farms in the town, and was in the hands of two families for about 200 years. It is now operated as the Old Farm Christmas Place, with some of its land devoted to the cultivation of Christmas trees. The property was listed on the National Register of Historic Places in 1997.

== Description and history ==
The Dyer–Hutchinson Farm is located in a rural area of Cape Elizabeth, its farmstead on the east side of Sawyer Road, a through road running north–south on the town's west side. The main farmhouse is a 1 1/2-story wood-frame Cape style structure, five bays wide, with a side-gable roof, off-center chimney, stone foundation, and a combination of shingle and clapboard siding. The main facade faces to the south, its center entrance flanked by sidelights and topped by a modest entablature. An ell extends to the right, joining the house to a garage. About 100 feet (30 m) to the south stands a garage-like building, with both a track-mounted garage door and a pedestrian entrance; this building was used historically for the manufacture of boxes, and houses original early 20th-century equipment for doing so. The house's interior follows a central-chimney plan, with a parlor to one side of the chimney and the kitchen to the other, with three small chambers in the back. Fireplaces have Federal period mantels, while the kitchen cabinets are of late 19th century vintage.

The first 9 acres (3.6 ha) of the farm were purchased in 1790 by William Dyer, who had married in that year, and the house was probably built soon afterward. According to a survey done by the town, this house is believed to be the oldest in western Cape Elizabeth. By 1850 the farm had grown to its present size, about 50 acres (20 ha). Dyer's children sold the property in 1864, and it was acquired by Edwin Hutchinson in 1864. It was occupied by his descendants until the 1990s, and it was by them that the box-making operation was established in the early 20th century. After standing vacant for several years, the property was rehabilitated, and is now protected by a preservation easement. It is currently used as a Christmas tree farm.

== See also ==
- National Register of Historic Places listings in Cumberland County, Maine
