= Union Church (North Harpswell, Maine) =

Historic church in Maine, United States

- U.S. National Register of Historic Places
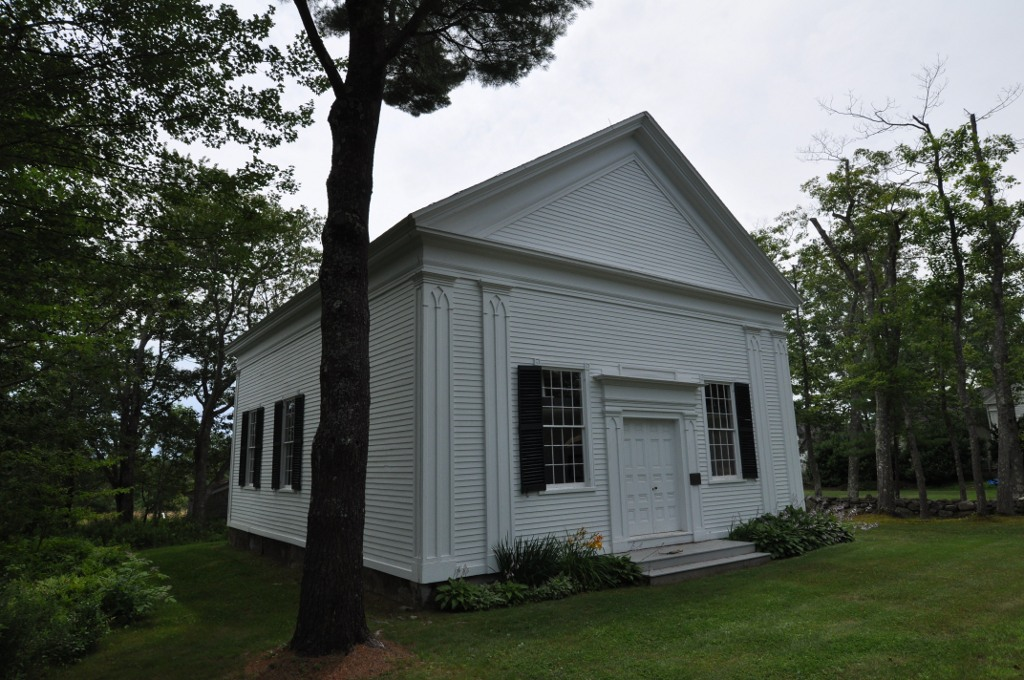

- Location within Maine Location within the United States
- Location: ME 123, North Harpswell, Maine
- Coordinates: 43°49′14″N 69°58′0″W
- Area: less than one acre
- Built: 1841
- Architectural style: Greek Revival
- NRHP reference No.: 88000889
- Added to NRHP: June 28, 1988

Union Church is a historic church on Harpswell Neck Road (Maine State Route 123) in North Harpswell, Maine. Built in 1841, it is architecturally a distinctive and well-preserved combination of Greek Revival and Gothic Revival styles. It was used over the years by a variety of religious groups, and is now maintained by the Harpswell Garden Club. The building was listed on the National Register of Historic Places in 1988.

== Description and history ==
The Union Church is located on the east side of Harpswell Neck Road, the principal north-south route in the peninsular community of Harpswell. It is located in the cluster of mainly residential buildings that make up the village of North Harpswell, a short way south of Bear Paw Road. The church is a single-story wood frame structure, with a gabled roof, clapboard siding, and a granite foundation. It has no tower. Its front facade faces west to the road, and is symmetrically arranged, with a center entrance framed by pilasters with lancet-arched panels and topped by an entablature with cornice. On either side of the entrance are sash windows, and outside those are pairs of taller lancet-paneled pilasters, which support an entablature and fully pedimented gabled. The interior is essentially unchanged since its construction, with a vestibule area that has two doors leading to aisles in the nave, which has bench pews accessed by low doors.

The church's construction date is traditionally given as 1841, although it is unclear exactly what religious organizations used it, as the only document supporting this date is a December 1840 promise by thirty residents to purchase pews in the contemplated structure. A Universalist society used the church beginning in 1844, but it declined by the 1870s, when it was used by Congregationalists. The Congregationalists abandoned the church in the 1920s, and it sat vacant until 1969, when it was taken over by the Harpswell Garden Club, which restored it and now maintains it.

== See also ==
- National Register of Historic Places listings in Cumberland County, Maine
