= Peabody-Fitch House =

- U.S. National Register of Historic Places
- U.S. Historic district
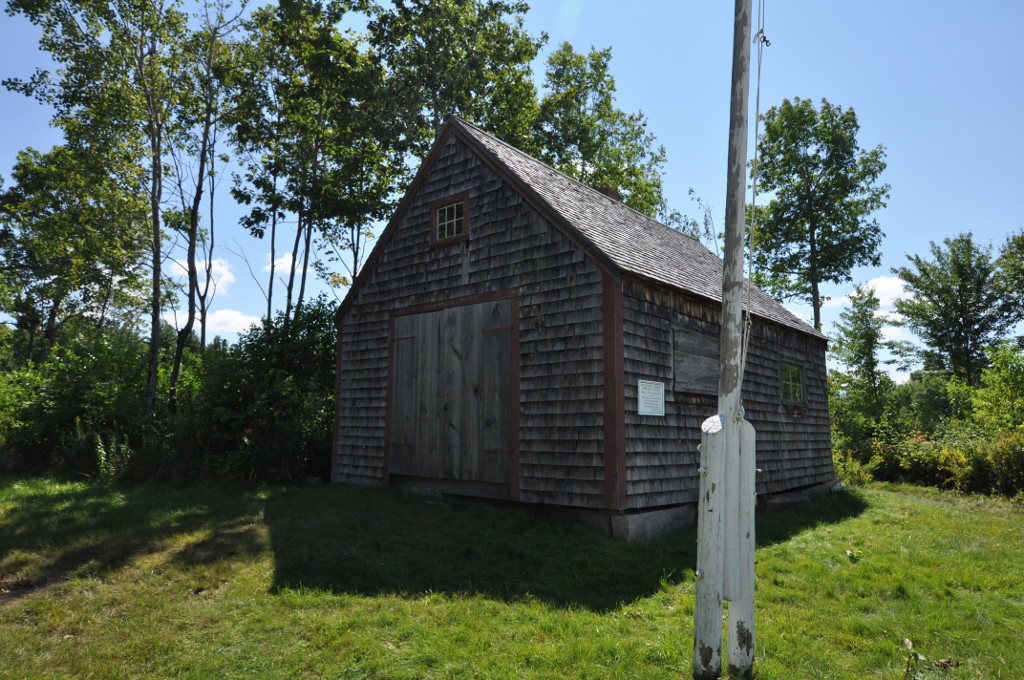
- Workshop building

- Location within Maine Location within the United States
- Nearest city: South Bridgton, Maine
- Coordinates: 43°58′59″N 70°43′28″W
- Area: 19.4 acres (7.9 ha)
- Built: 1790
- Architectural style: Federal
- NRHP reference No.: 89000254
- Added to NRHP: April 7, 1989

The Peabody-Fitch House, also known as Narramissic Farm, is a historic farm property on Ingalls Road in Bridgton, Maine. It is a well-preserved late 18th to early 19th century farmstead, now owned and operated by the local historical society as a museum property. It was listed on the National Register of Historic Places in 1989.

== Description and history ==
The Peabody-Fitch property is located in southern Bridgton, on a rise known locally as Fitch Hill on the south side of Ingalls Road, west of Maine State Route 107. The farmstead is set amid former agricultural fields and woods, which contain landscaped evidence of the property's former use, including stone walls, fences, and former roadways. The farmstead consists of a rambling farmhouse, a barn, and a smaller wood-frame structure that once served as a blacksmith's shop. The farmhouse is a two-story clapboarded wood-frame structure to which a series of additions have been made, most before 1850. The barn is a timber-frame structure with a sliding door, and a small shed-roof addition at one end. The blacksmith's shop is a single story wood-frame structure, with a single door and three windows.

The main block of the house was probably built in 1797 by William Peabody, one of Bridgton's first settlers. The house remained in the hands of his descendants, mostly named Fitch, until 1910. It was purchased as a summer retreat in 1937 by Margaret Monroe of Providence, Rhode Island, and was given by her heirs to the Bridgton Historical Society. Through these transitions, it has maintained the basic layout of a typical late-18th or early-19th century farmstead, with a detached barn and other outbuildings. The principal loss is of a much larger barn, whose foundational remains lie nearby.

The house and farmstead are open by appointment, or during special events staged by the historical society.

== See also ==
- National Register of Historic Places listings in Cumberland County, Maine
