= Isaac W. Dyer Estate =

Historic house in Maine, United States

- U.S. National Register of Historic Places
- U.S. Historic district
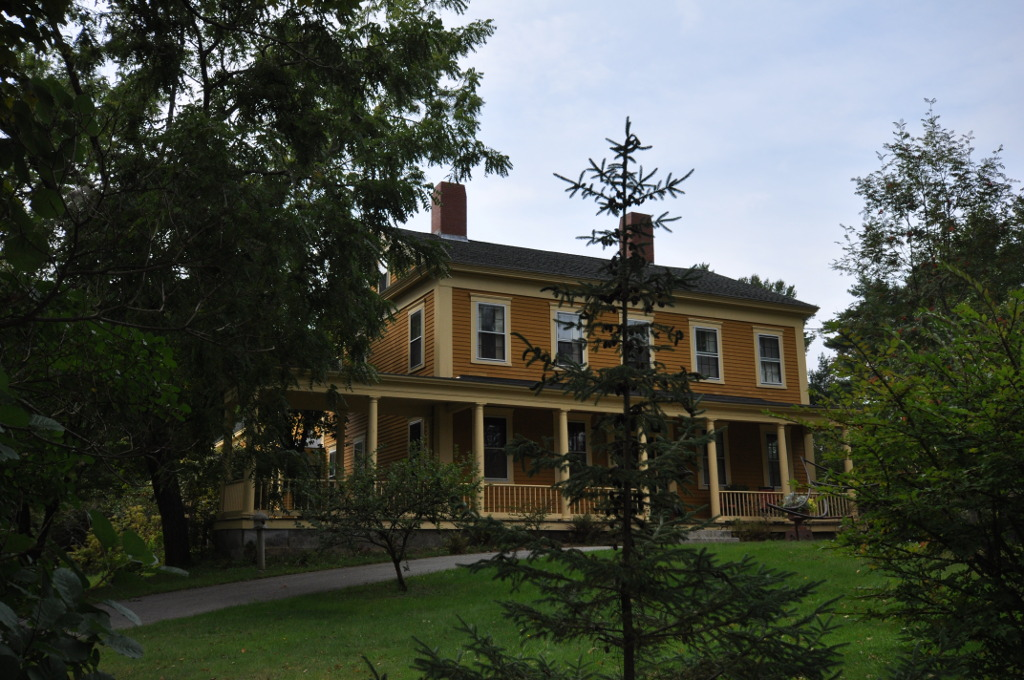

- Location within Maine Location within the United States
- Nearest city: 180 Fort Hill Rd., Gorham, Maine
- Coordinates: 43°41′18″N 70°26′56″W
- Area: 6.4 acres (2.6 ha)
- Built: 1785
- Architectural style: Greek Revival
- NRHP reference No.: 98000307
- Added to NRHP: April 1, 1998

The Isaac W. Dyer Estate is a historic property at 180 Fort Hill Road in Gorham, Maine. The property consists of an 1850s Greek Revival house, and a collection of farm-related outbuildings and landscaping added in the early 20th century as part of a transformation of the property into gentleman's farm by Isaac Watson Dyer, a prominent Portland lawyer. The property was listed on the National Register of Historic Places in 1998.

== Description and history ==
The Dyer Estate is located north of Gorham center, on the west side of Fort Hill Road (Maine State Route 114), the main northbound route from the center. Set on over 6 acres (2.4 ha) of land are the main house, and a collection of farm outbuildings that includes a storage barn, animal barn, greenhouse, equipment shed, and other buildings. Landscaped features of the property include a pond, impounded by an earthen dam at its south end, a croquet lawn bordered by a cedar hedge, and a walled garden. The house is a 2-1/2 story Greek Revival structure, with a side gable roof, twin interior chimneys, and clapboard siding. It has a single-story porch extending across its front and south sides.

The construction date of the house is not known with certainty, but local records show that the original house was built ~1783-5; later renovations and extensions were added, with the current Greek-revival facade and porch being added probably sometime in the 1850s, by one of two known owners during that period. The property, then more than 120 acres (49 ha), was purchased in 1888 by Isaac W. Dyer, a prominent Portland lawyer who served in the Maine legislature and as the United States District Attorney for many years. This property was Dyer's summer estate, and about 1900 he began a major transformation, building most of the outbuildings and landscaped features visible today. These types of built-up summer "gentleman's farm" properties are increasingly rare in the state, and the Dyer estate is notable as one of the few known that includes a walled garden.

== See also ==
- National Register of Historic Places listings in Cumberland County, Maine
