= Intervale Farm =

- U.S. National Register of Historic Places
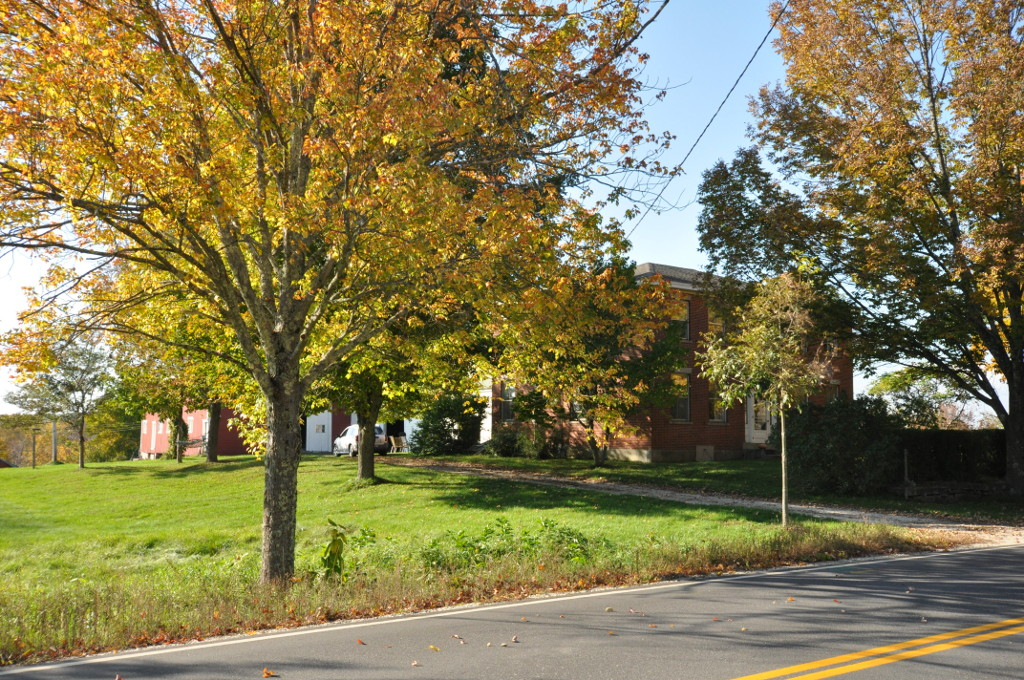

- Location within Maine Location within the United States
- Location: 1047 Intervale Rd., New Gloucester, Maine
- Coordinates: 43°55′39″N 70°15′6″W
- Area: 34 acres (14 ha)
- Built: 1811
- Architectural style: Federal
- NRHP reference No.: 03001407
- Added to NRHP: January 14, 2004

Intervale Farm is a historic farm property at 1047 Intervale Road in New Gloucester, Maine, United States. Its brick farmhouse, built early in the 19th century, is one of the few Federal style brick houses in the rural community, and the connected farmstead is one of the area's early examples of the type. A portion of the farm (34 acres (14 ha) was listed on the National Register of Historic Places in 2004. It is an active operation, raising vegetables and beef.

== Description and history ==
Intervale Farm is located in southern New Gloucester, on the west side of Intervale Road (Maine State Route 231). It consists of 118 acres (48 ha) (down from a maximum of 275 acres (111 ha) once associated with the farm), of which 34 acres (14 ha) around the main farmhouse are under active cultivation, producing a variety of crops. The main house is a two-story brick structure, with a hip roof and a series of wood-frame additions connecting it to a barn. The main facade faces east, toward the street, and is symmetrical, five bays wide, with a center entrance flanked by sidelight windows and topped by a Federal style wooden fan. The interior follows a traditional center-hall plan, somewhat altered by the addition of bathrooms and the repurposing of the original kitchen to serve as bedrooms. It retains modest original Federal period woodwork.

The early history of the house lacks clear documentation, but may well have been built by Jabez Cushman, an early owner of the land who was quite wealthy, and active in local civic affairs. It has been assigned a construction date of about 1811 based on an inscription on one of its attic beams. The relatively large size and sophisticated style of the house (built when most houses in the area were single-story Capes) suggest it was built by a person of some stature. The connected farmstead seen today reached its approximate configuration sometime before 1870, when it is documented in a photograph.

== See also ==
- National Register of Historic Places listings in Cumberland County, Maine
