= First Parish Meetinghouse (Standish, Maine) =

Historic church in Maine, United States

- U.S. National Register of Historic Places
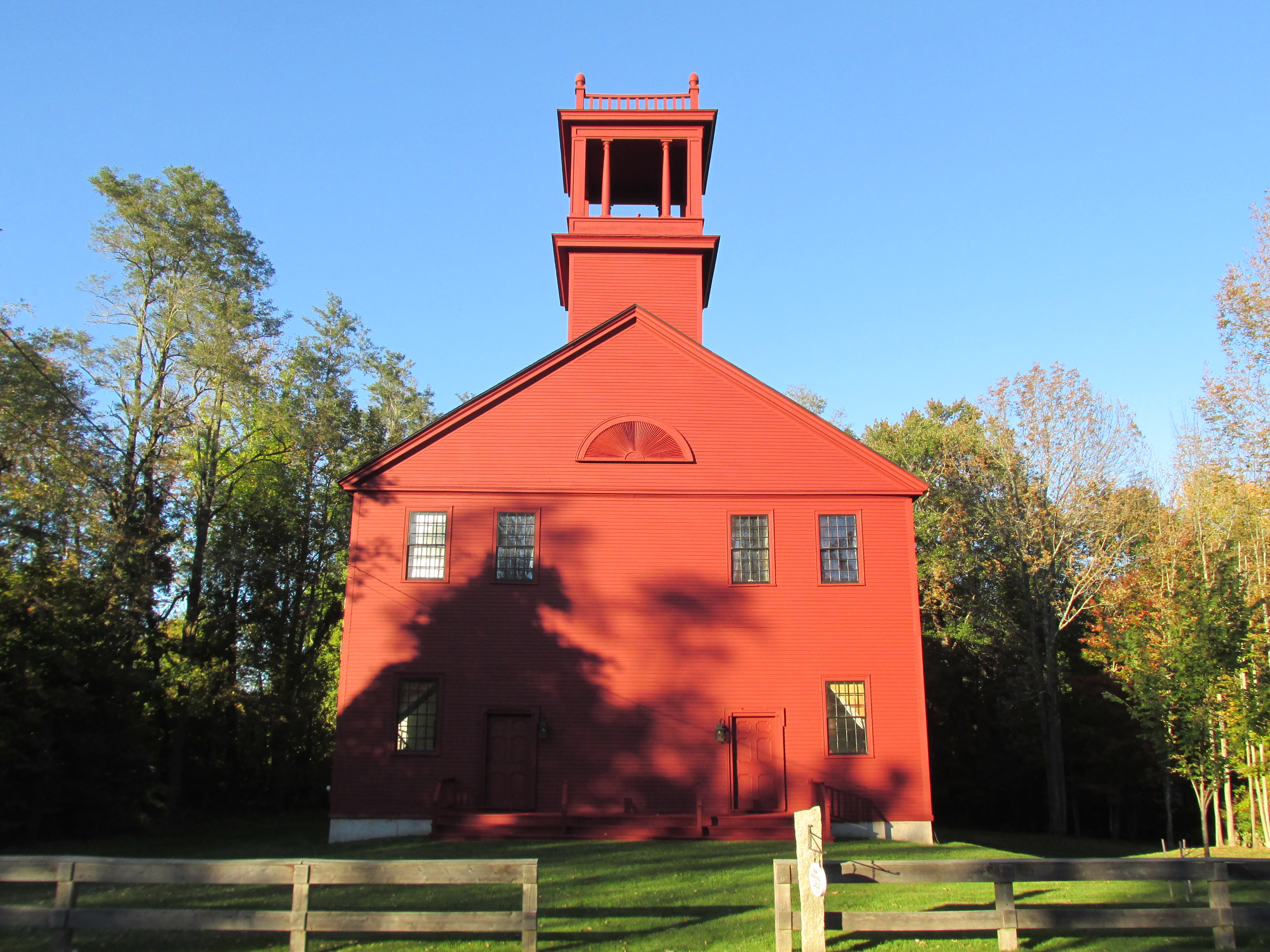
- First Parish Meetinghouse

- Location within Maine Location within the United States
- Location: Oak Hill Rd., Standish, Maine
- Coordinates: 43°44′17″N 70°33′21″W
- Area: 2 acres (0.81 ha)
- Built: 1804
- NRHP reference No.: 75000204
- Added to NRHP: March 27, 1975

The First Parish Meetinghouse, also known as the Old Red Church, is a historic church building on Oak Hill Road in Standish, Maine. Built 1804-06, it is a well-preserved example of rural Federal period design. The building has served the community as a church and school, and is still occasionally used for religious services. It was listed on the National Register of Historic Places in 1975.

== Description and history ==
The Old Red Church stands in the main village of Standish, near its northern edge, on the northeasteast side of Oak Hill Road. The church is a two-story wood frame structure, with front-facing gabled roof, clapboard siding, and a stone foundation. The front facade, facing the street, is symmetrically arranged, with two entrances set widely apart, with flanking sash windows to the outside, and sash windows above. The main gable has a full pediment, with a Federal period fan louver at the center. The facade is topped by a two-stage square tower, with an open belfry at the second stage, and a balustrade at the top with finialed posts.

The interior originally had a large two-story meeting space with a gallery around part of the second floor. In 1848 the second floor was built out fully as part of the building's conversion to educational use. The original box pews and pulpit remain on the first floor.

The church was built in 1804-06 on land donated by the Rev. Daniel Marrett, and served a Congregationalist congregation. In 1834 the congregation split over Unitarianism, with the Unitarian faction retaining the building. It used the building for religious services until 1860, adding the second story in 1848 to house a short-lived academy. In the 1890s and 1900s the building was again briefly used for education purposes, as the town high school.

== See also ==
- National Register of Historic Places listings in Cumberland County, Maine
