= Merriconegan Farm =

- U.S. National Register of Historic Places
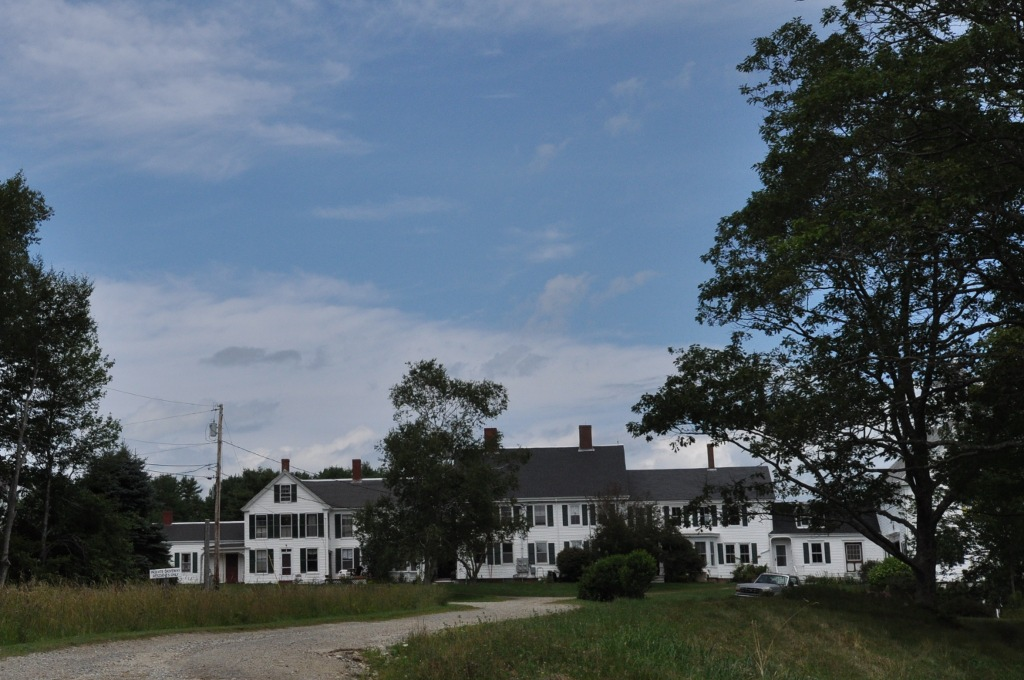

- Location within Maine Location within the United States
- Location: ME 123, Harpswell, Maine
- Coordinates: 43.85447°N 69.94925°W
- Area: 1 acre (0.40 ha)
- Built: 1830
- Architectural style: Greek Revival
- NRHP reference No.: 79000269
- Added to NRHP: June 15, 1979

Merriconegan Farm, or Merrucoonegan Farm, is a historic farm property on Maine State Route 123 in North Harpswell, Maine. The farmstead, most of which dates to the 1830s, is a remarkably well preserved and extensive example of a connected farm complex. It was listed on the National Register of Historic Places in 1979.

== Description and history ==
Merriconegan Farm is located on the northern portion of the Harpswell Neck, a long and narrow peninsula extending southward from Brunswick, Maine. It is set on the west side of the peninsula's main road, Harpswell Neck Road, also designated Maine State Route 123. The farmstead is set between fields and the wooded areas of the Skolfield Shores Preserve, which is privately held conservation land open to the public. The farmstead is a long series of connected wood-frame structures, most 2 1/2 stories in height. As viewed from the south (the main approach) it consists of a barn, an ell, a house, an ell, another house, two ells, and a second barn. Most of these structures date to the 1830s; the ell and barn at the right end date to 1885 and 1897, respectively.

The land that became Merriconegan Farm was acquired in the late 18th century by Thomas Skolfield, an Irish immigrant from a wealthy landed family. His son and grandson, Clement and George Roger Skolfield, built the oldest portion of the complex (the right house and ell immediately to its right) sometime before 1834. The remaining elements (except the rightmost sections) were built about 1834 by George Roger's son and grandson. The assemblage is one of the most impressive and well-preserved examples of the connected 19th-century farmstead to be found anywhere in New England.

== See also ==
- National Register of Historic Places listings in Cumberland County, Maine
