= Fitch's General Store and House =

Historic house in Maine, United States

- U.S. National Register of Historic Places
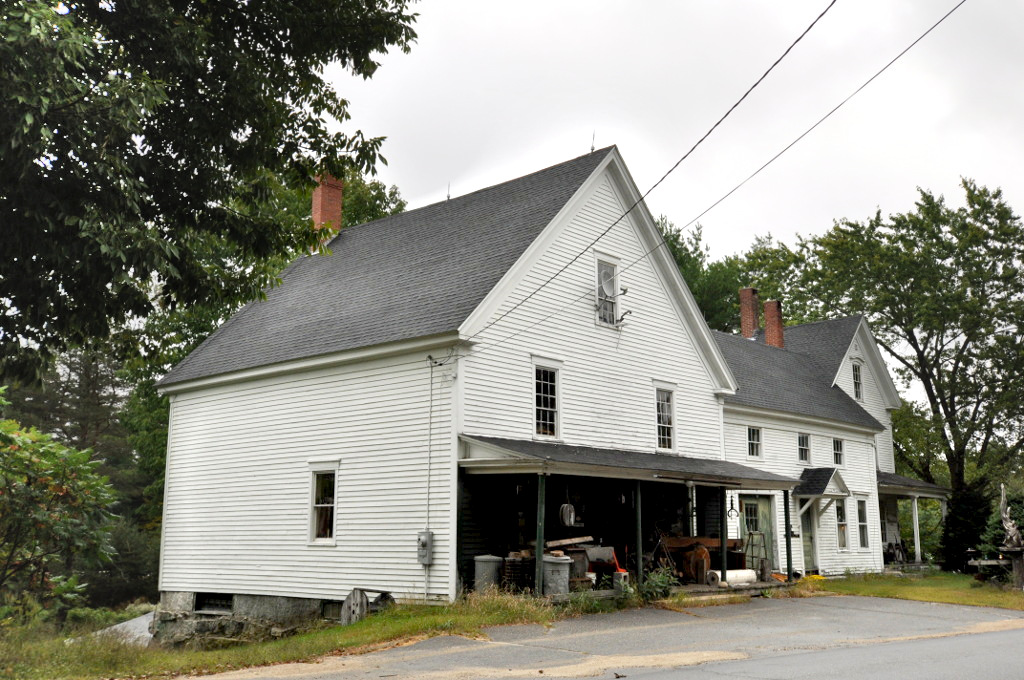

- Location within Maine Location within the United States
- Location: Long Hill Rd., E side, at jct. with ME 114, East Sebago, Maine
- Coordinates: 43°51′26″N 70°38′32″W
- Area: 1.8 acres (0.73 ha)
- Built: 1870
- Architectural style: Italianate, Greek Revival
- NRHP reference No.: 95000215
- Added to NRHP: March 10, 1995

Fitch's General Store and House is a historic former commercial establishment on Long Hill Road in the village of East Sebago, Maine. Built about 1870 as a private residence, it became a general store in 1920 and was a mainstay of local business in the rural community. The property was listed on the National Register of Historic Places in 1995. As of 2014, it was apparently again a private residence.

== Description and history ==
The former Fitch's General Store is located at the crook of the V-shaped junction between Long Hill Road and Maine State Route 114 in the rural village of East Sebago. It is a rambling 2 1/2-story complex, built of wood framing sheathed in clapboards and resting on a granite foundation. Both the store and the house have gable roofs, with a two-story ell connecting them. There is modest Greek Revival and Italianate styling, including bracketed lintels on some of the windows, and corner pilasters.

The house and store were built about 1870 by George E. Fitch, the store originally a barn. His father had established one of the first stores in the area in 1832, just across the road. That business continued to be operated by George Fitch and his descendants until it was struck by lightning and burned to the ground in 1919. At that time, Montford Fitch converted his father's barn into a store, and reopened the business there. When the property was listed on the National Register of Historic Places in 1995, it was still in business; it has since closed.

== See also ==
- National Register of Historic Places listings in Cumberland County, Maine
