= Vallee Family House =

Historic house in Maine, United States

- U.S. National Register of Historic Places
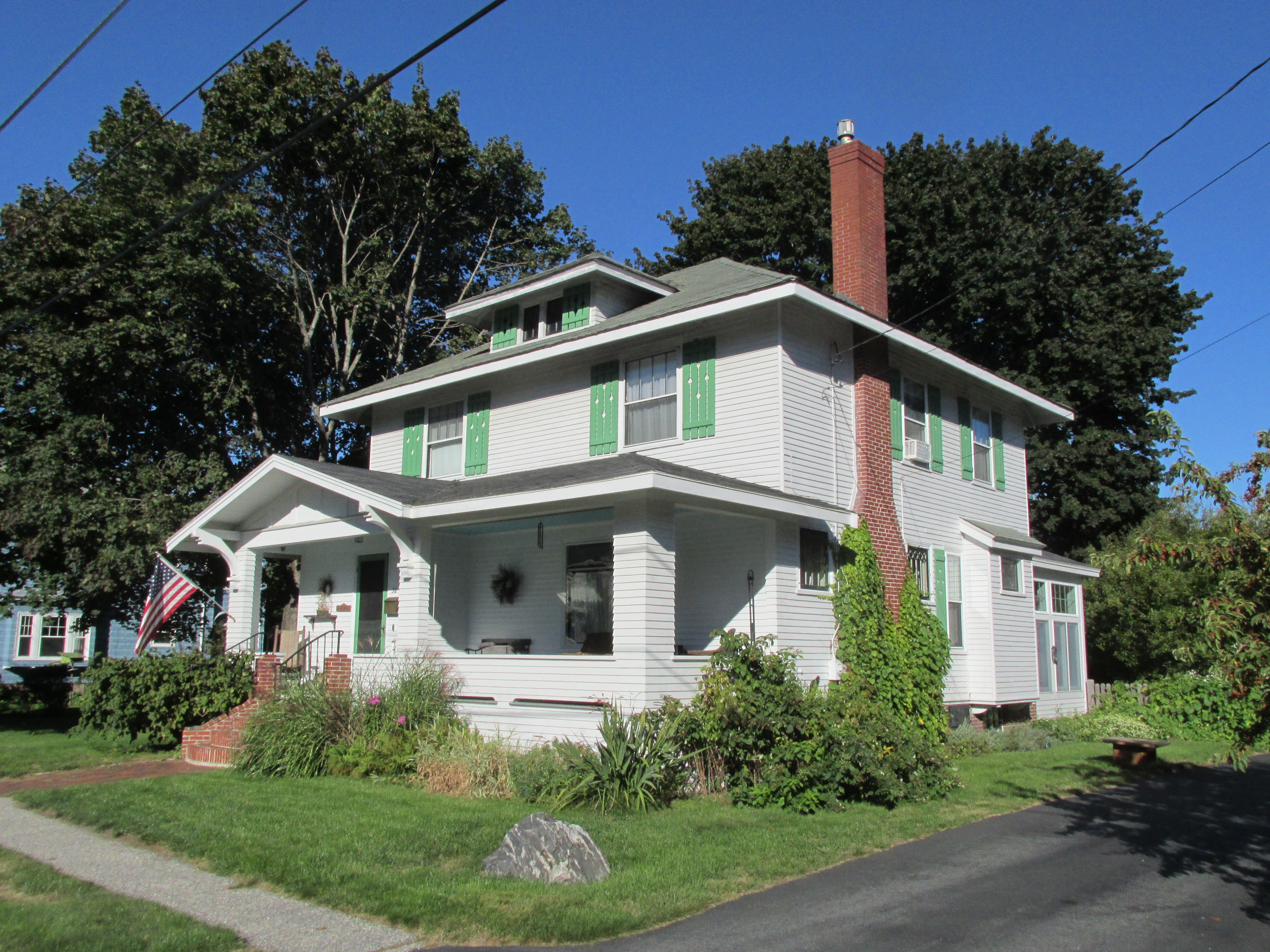

- Location within Maine Location within the United States
- Location: 36 Monroe Ave., Westbrook, Maine
- Coordinates: 43°40′27″N 70°21′32″W
- Area: less than one acre
- Built: 1914
- NRHP reference No.: 88001853
- Added to NRHP: October 13, 1988

The Vallée Family House is an historic house at 36 Monroe Avenue in Westbrook, Maine. Built in 1914, this architecturally undistinguished American Foursquare house was a childhood home of entertainer Rudy Vallée during the period in which his interests in music and entertaining developed. It was listed on the National Register of Historic Places in 1993.

== Description and history ==
The Vallée Family House is located on the east side of Monroe Avenue, a residential side street east of downtown Westbrook. It is a fairly typical American Foursquare house, roughly square in shape and two stories in height, with a hip roof and clapboard siding. A hip-roof dormer projects from the front-facing roof face, and a single-story hip-roof porch extends across its front. A gable projects over the front steps, with false half-timbering in the gable, and large decorative brackets as support. The interior follows a side hall plan.

The house was built in 1914 for Charles A. Vallee, the owner of a local drugstore. Vallee had moved to Westbrook in 1905, and it is here that his son, Hubert Prior Vallee, grew up. Better known by his stage name of Rudy, the younger Vallee developed his interest in music and entertaining while growing up here, exposed to music through records and phonographs at his father's drugstore, and movies through work at local theaters. By 1920 he was playing the saxophone in local orchestras, and he rose to national stardom in the 1930s.

== See also ==
- National Register of Historic Places listings in Cumberland County, Maine
