= Falmouth House =

Historic house in Maine, United States

- U.S. National Register of Historic Places
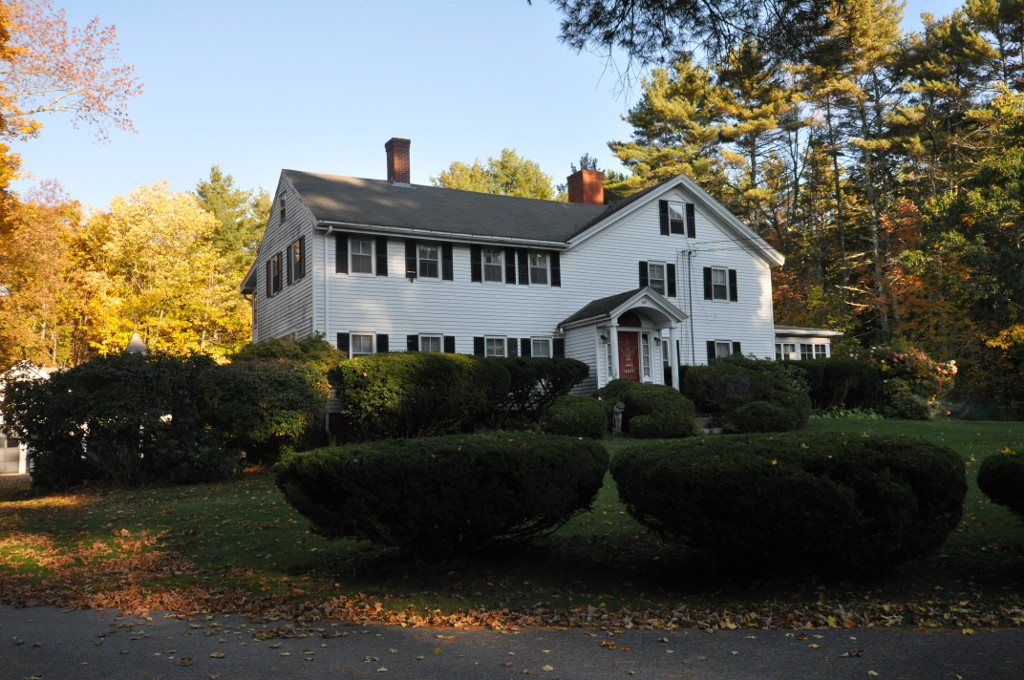

- Location within Maine Location within the United States
- Location: 349 Gray Rd., North Falmouth, Maine
- Coordinates: 43°46′21″N 70°18′4″W
- Area: 1 acre (0.40 ha)
- Built: 1820
- NRHP reference No.: 76000091
- Added to NRHP: September 1, 1976

The Falmouth House is a historic former tavern house at 349 Gray Road in Falmouth, Maine. Built about 1820, it is a well-preserved Federal period tavern building, now converted to private residential use. It was listed on the National Register of Historic Places in 1976.

== Description and history ==
The Falmouth House is located in a rural part of northern Falmouth, on the east side of Gray Road (Maine State Route 100), which was historically the main 19th century route between Portland and the growing cities of Auburn and Lewiston. The main block of the house is a 2 1/2-story wood-frame structure, with a side-gable roof, central chimney, clapboard siding, and stone foundation. It is oriented facing south, with a symmetrical facade whose first floor is now obscured by a hip-roofed enclosed porch. Its historic main entrance, located on this facade, is flanked by Federal style pilasters and topped by a pediment. A historically secondary entrance, on the building's west side, now acts as the main entrance, and is sheltered by an early 20th-century arched portico, supported by two round columns. A period ell extends to the north of the main block.

The tavern was built in 1820 by Samuel Hicks, to serve travelers on the primary route northeast from Portland. It was moved early in its lifetime with the present Gray Road was opened, and served travelers on that route until the advent of the automobile reduced demand. It was owned for much of the 19th century by members of the Washburn family, and was known as the Washburn Tavern or Washburn Inn. The upper floor of the ell retains its original hostelry room layout.

== See also ==
- National Register of Historic Places listings in Cumberland County, Maine
- Falmouth Historical Society on Falmouth Heritage Museum
