= Seavey-Robinson House =

Historic house in Maine, United States

- U.S. National Register of Historic Places
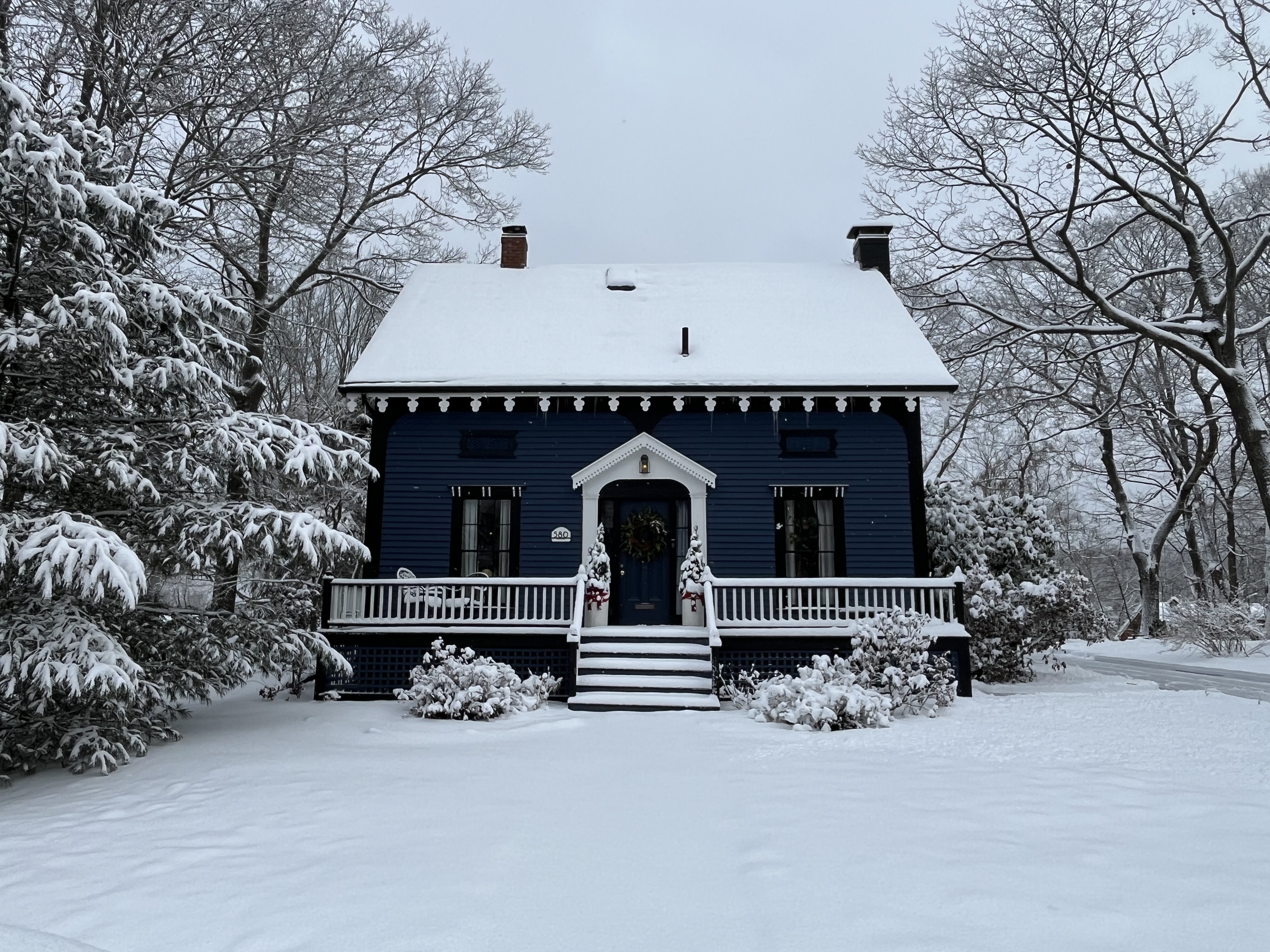
- The Seavey-Robinson House in South Portland, Maine.

- Location within Maine Location within the United States
- Location: 580 Ocean St., South Portland, Maine
- Coordinates: 43°37′21.7″N 70°14′56.3″W
- Area: 0.3 acres (0.12 ha)
- Built: 1854
- Built by: Joseph Seavey
- Architectural style: Gothic Revival, Carpenter Gothic
- NRHP reference No.: 86002468
- Added to NRHP: September 11, 1986

The Seavey-Robinson House is a historic house built in the Carpenter Gothic style in South Portland, Maine. Built c. 1854–57, it is a rare example of a Carpenter Gothic cottage, originally built in a rural setting, since urbanized. It was added to the National Register of Historic Places in 1986.

== Description and history ==
The Seavey-Robinson House is located in southern South Portland, on the east side of Ocean Street (Maine State Route 77) at the southeastern corner with Spear Avenue. It is a single-story wood-frame structure, with a side gable roof and clapboard siding. The cornice and rake edge of the gable are decorated with delicate vergeboard that has an acorn motif. The main entrance is flanked by pilasters and topped by a gabled cornice with cresting and vergeboard decoration. Windows are topped by bracketed cornices. An open veranda extends across the front, its balustrade also with delicate woodwork.

The home is a rare surviving farm cottage in what is now an urban section of South Portland. It was built ca. 1854-1857 by Joseph Seavey, the original owner and a carpenter, and served as a display for his construction abilities. The house was purchased in 1864 by Elipalet Robinson, whose family owned it into the 20th century.

== See also ==
- National Register of Historic Places listings in Cumberland County, Maine
