= Dry Mills Schoolhouse =

- Dry Mills Schoolhouse Museum
- U.S. National Register of Historic Places
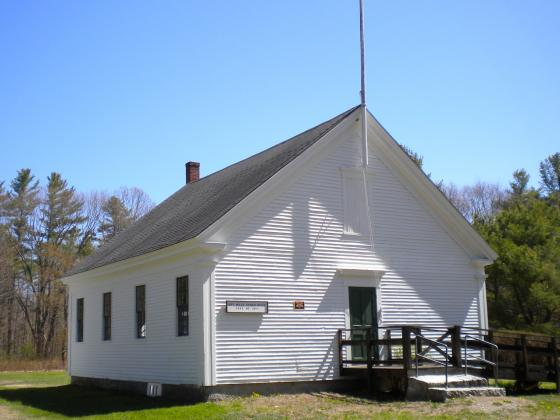

- Location within Maine
- Location: Game Farm Rd, Gray, Maine
- Coordinates: 43°55′42″N 70°21′00″W
- Built: circa 1857
- Architectural style: Greek Revival
- NRHP reference No.: 96001495
- Added to NRHP: December 13, 1996

The Dry Mills Schoolhouse is a historic schoolhouse on Game Farm Road in Gray, Maine. Built about 1857, it is the town's last surviving single-room district schoolhouse, and is now a local museum. The building was added to the National Register of Historic Places listings on December 13, 1996.

== Description and history ==
The Dry Mills Schoolhouse is set on the north side of the main access road to the Maine Wildlife Park in northern Gray. It is a single-story wood frame structure, with a front-facing gable roof, clapboard siding, and a granite block foundation. Its modest Greek Revival styling includes paneled corner pilasters rising to a short frieze board, and short corner returns. The main (south-facing) facade is relatively unadorned, with the entrance centered below a now-closed opening in the gable, with a flagpole mounted in front of it. The interior has a vestibule across the southern side, which opens into the single classroom, which has vertical wainscoting below slate chalkboards.

The schoolhouse was built about 1857, and served as the district 3 school (out of 12 districts). It was used as a primary school until 1959, and was adapted for use as a preschool facility in the 1970s. In 1990 the building, including its foundation stones, was relocated to the present location from its original site on Maine State Route 26, about 1.5 miles (2.4 km) away. It is the last of the town's district schools to survive. In the early 1990s it was restored to its original condition except for an outhouse that used to be attached to the building. The restorations cost approximately $12,000. There is a period wood stove, original chalk board and furnishings on the inside. There are also class pictures and textbooks of the time.

The school is now known as "The Dry Mills Schoolhouse Museum" and is still owned and operated by the town. The museum portrays a one-house schoolhouse of the mid-19th century. It is open to the public June through September on the weekends, but groups (such as school or camp field trips) are always able to visit.

== See also ==
- National Register of Historic Places listings in Cumberland County, Maine
