= Stimson Memorial Hall =

- U.S. National Register of Historic Places
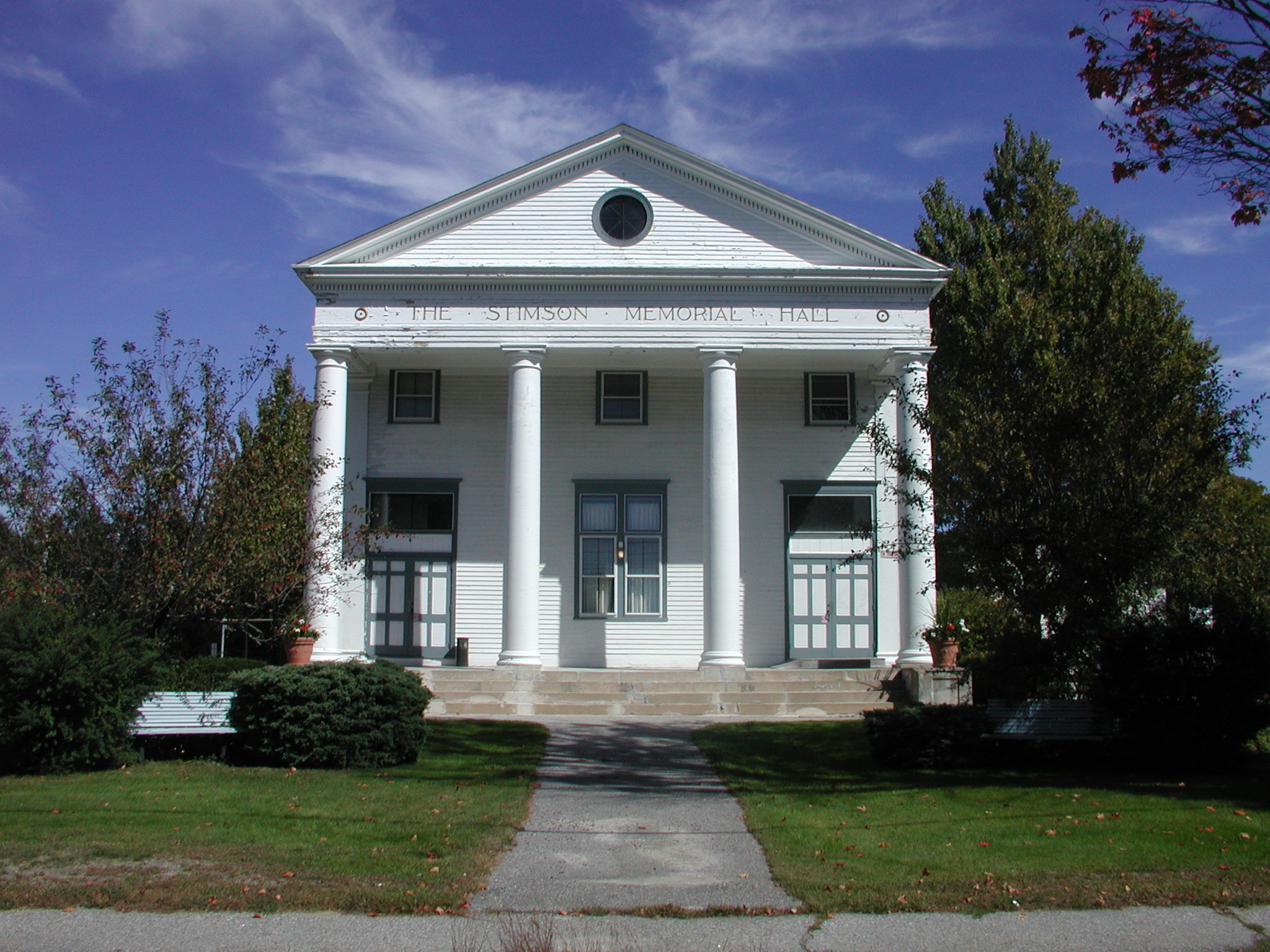

- Location within Maine Location within the United States
- Location: 4 Shaker Rd., Gray, Maine
- Coordinates: 43°53′11″N 70°19′52″W
- Area: less than one acre
- Built: 1900
- Architect: Elzner & Anderson
- Architectural style: Colonial Revival
- NRHP reference No.: 92001296
- Added to NRHP: October 2, 1992

Stimson Memorial Hall is a historic government building at 4 Shaker Road in the center of Gray, Maine. Built in 1900, it served for many years as the town's main public meeting space, and is a prominent landmark in the town center. It was listed on the National Register of Historic Places for its architectural and social significance in 1992. It is still owned by the town, but was occupied by a church group and listed for sale as of 2015. It was also listed by the state as one of its most endangered historic properties in 2015, due to its poor condition and lack of preservation plan.

== Description and history ==
Stimson Memorial Hall stands in the center of Gray, just northwest of the junction of Main Street (United States Route 202) and Shaker Road (Maine State Route 26). It stands just east of the town's former municipal office building, and west of the town's Civil War memorial, which stands at the street corner. The hall is a two-story wood frame structure, with a gable roof and a high brick basement. The roof extends over the front to create a temple portico, with a gabled pediment and entablature supported by four Tuscan columns. There are pilasters at the front corners, and a small round window in the center of the pediment. The interior has a vestibule leading to the main auditorium, and stairs to the second floor, which houses several smaller rooms at the front, including a storage space behind the pediment.

The hall was built 1900 as a gift to the town, primarily through the efforts of Abbie Stimson Ingalls, with funding from her and the other children of Gray native Theophilus and Mary Stimson. It was designed by Elzner and Anders of Cincinnati, Ohio, and was built on land originally purchased by the local Universalist congregation. The upper level house the town library until the 1950s. The building was administered by the town and a donor-chosen board until 1921, when oversight was taken over completely by the town.

With the building in poor condition, the town in 2013 refused to authorize the cost of rehabilitation, and considered demolition in 2014. The building was put up for sale in 2015, and is presently under lease to a church. The church lease ended and Stimson along with two other buildings were sold by the Town to the Libby Foundation. The old Town hall and the Stimson Hall have since been sold to a private owner who in 2020 is renovating the old Town Hall and has plans for Stimson

== See also ==
- National Register of Historic Places listings in Cumberland County, Maine
