= Thomas Skelton House =

Historic house in Maine, United States

- U.S. National Register of Historic Places
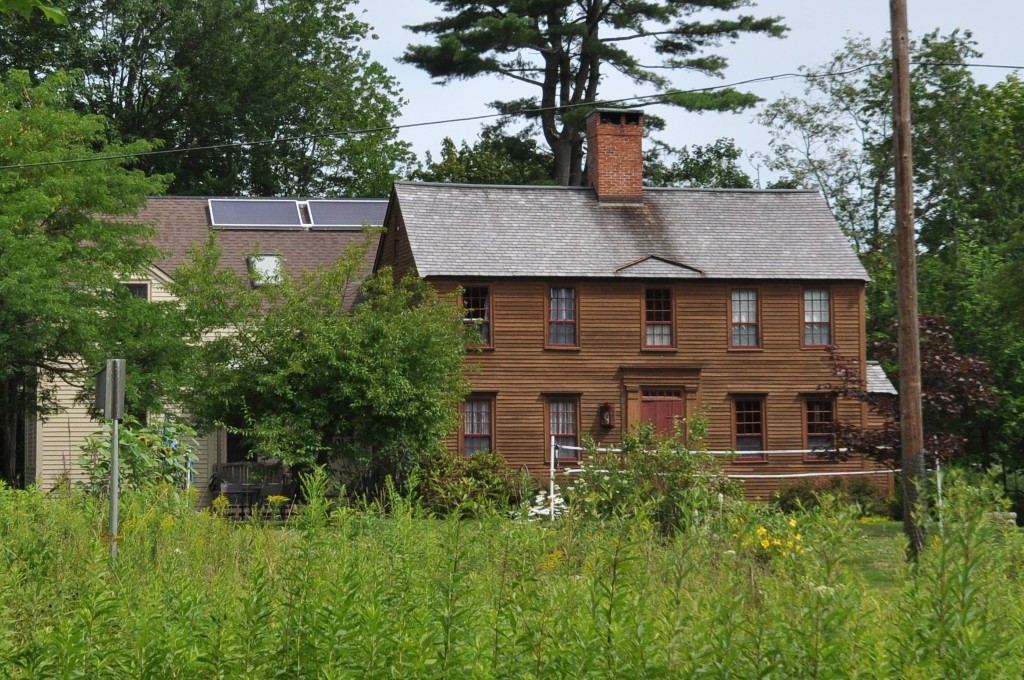

- Location within Maine Location within the United States
- Nearest city: 124 US 1, Falmouth, Maine
- Coordinates: 43°42′28″N 70°14′14″W
- Area: 1 acre (0.40 ha)
- Built: 1798
- Architectural style: Federal
- NRHP reference No.: 73000124
- Added to NRHP: May 7, 1973

The Thomas Skelton House is a historic house at 124 United States Route 1 in Falmouth, Maine. Built in around 1798 in Portland, it is a well-preserved example of Federal style architecture. It was moved to its present site in 1971 to avoid demolition. It was listed on the National Register of Historic Places on May 7, 1973.

== Description and history ==
The Thomas Skelton House stands at the northern corner of Old US 1 and Gilsland Farm Road in southeastern Falmouth. It is a 2 1/2-story wood-frame structure, five bays wide, with a side-gable roof, central chimney, clapboard siding, and a concrete foundation faced in brick. The house is oriented facing southeast, on a lot that also includes a garage and former carriage barn. Its main entrance is in the center, flanked by pilasters and topped by a simple entablature. The interior retains original plaster and woodwork, and follows a typical center-chimney plan. The entry vestibule has a narrow winding stair leading to the second floor, with parlor to the left and kitchen to the right, with a long and narrow room behind the chimney. A modern shed-roof ell has been added to the rear, in which modern kitchen facilities are located.

The house was built about 1798 by Thomas Skelton, a Portland housewright, and stood on Pleasant Street in Portland. Originally 1 1/2 stories in height, the second story was added about 1810, around the time its owner, Benjamin Deake, married. Threatened with demolition, the building was carefully documented in 1971 by the Greater Portland Landmarks Commission, and then moved to this site and restored. It is one of Portland's oldest surviving buildings.

== See also ==
- National Register of Historic Places listings in Cumberland County, Maine
