= Stephen Longfellow House =

Historic house in Maine, United States

- U.S. National Register of Historic Places
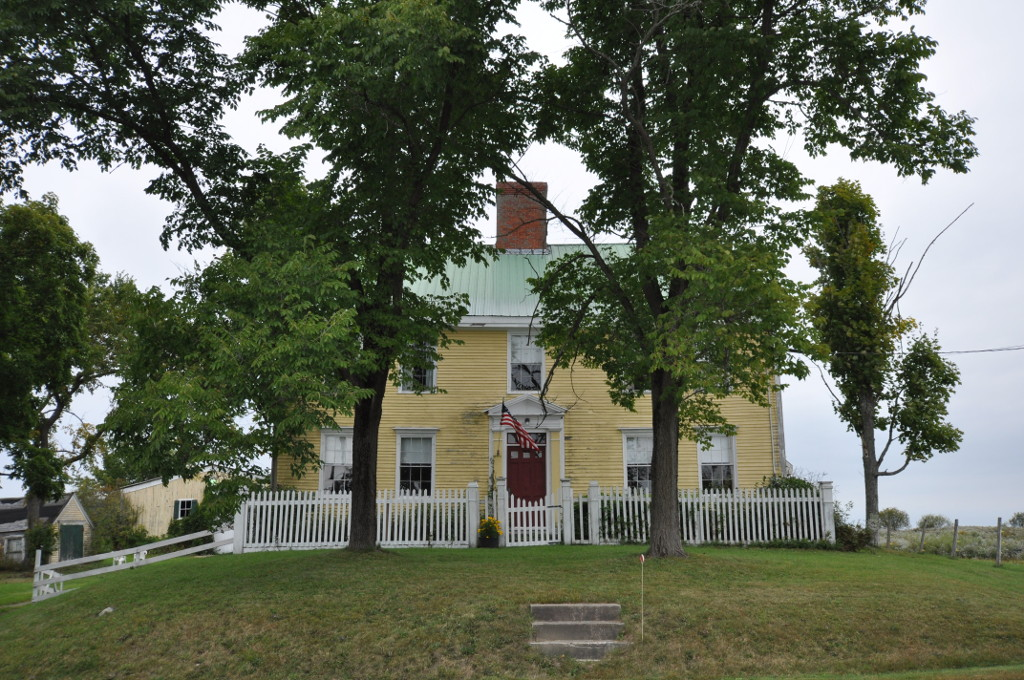

- Location within Maine Location within the United States
- Nearest city: Longfellow Rd., Gorham, Maine
- Coordinates: 43°40′7″N 70°23′54″W
- Area: 1 acre (0.40 ha)
- Built: 1761
- Architectural style: Greek Revival
- NRHP reference No.: 84001365
- Added to NRHP: March 22, 1984

The Stephen Longfellow House is a historic house on Longfellow Road in Gorham, Maine. It was built in 1761, and was bought in 1775 by Stephen Longfellow, the great-grandfather of poet Henry Wadsworth Longfellow, and contains one of the state's finest Georgian interiors. It was listed on the National Register of Historic Places in 1984.

== Description and history ==
The Longfellow house is located in a rural area of eastern Gorham, on the north side of Longfellow Road, opposite its junction with Dragonfly Lane. It is a 2 1/2-story wood-frame structure, with a side-gable roof, central chimney, clapboarded exterior, and granite foundation. Its main facade is five bays wide, with a center entrance flanked by pilasters and topped by a gabled pediment. A single-story ell extends to the northeast. The house interior is laid out in a typical center-chimney plan, with the front parlors feature carved paneling on the walls, and the center stairway featuring finely carved newel posts and an elegant handrail.

The house was built in 1761, and was purchased in 1775 by Stephen Longfellow after his Portland home was destroyed by British military forces in the Burning of Falmouth. His son, Stephen Jr., was trained as a lawyer, and was active in the town's civic affairs, and also served as a trustee of the Gorham Academy and Bowdoin College. It is known that a young Henry Wadsworth Longfellow was a visitor to what was then his grandfather's farm.

== See also ==
- National Register of Historic Places listings in Cumberland County, Maine
