= Beckett's Castle =

Historic house in Maine, United States

- U.S. National Register of Historic Places
- Location within Maine Location within the United States
- Location: Singles Road, Cape Elizabeth, Maine
- Coordinates: 43°36′55″N 70°12′42″W
- Area: 0.5 acres (0.20 ha)
- Built: 1871
- Architectural style: Gothic
- NRHP reference No.: 74000156
- Added to NRHP: December 31, 1974

Beckett's Castle is a historic summer house on Singles Road in Cape Elizabeth, Maine. A picturesque two-story stone building with a three-story tower, it was built in 1871-74 by Sylvester Beckett, a Portland lawyer and a major figure in the city's literary scene. It was listed on the National Register of Historic Places in 1974, for its association with Beckett, and for its distinctive Gothic architecture.

== Description and history ==
Beckett's Castle is set facing Casco Bay on the east side of Cape Elizabeth, at the end of Singles Road, a private lane off Shore Road. It is a two-story masonry structure, built of local gray fieldstone laid in irregular courses, and with a three-story square tower projecting south from its southeast corner. The roof is gabled, with steeply pitched gables at the ends and on the south (front) facade. The main entrance is on the south side of the tower, with a three-part window on the main facade to its left. The tower has three stages, each slightly smaller than the one below, with a projecting beltcourse at the top of each stage. At the top is a modillioned cornice with a short observation area above, topped by a hip roof. The building interior has restrained period woodwork.

The castle was constructed by the labor of Sylvester Beckett, a Portland-born son of English immigrants who trained and worked as a lawyer, but also worked as a journalist and writer, and had an amateur interest in ornithology. Beckett was a major social force in Portland's literary community, hosting social gatherings here that included expansive dinners cooked in a rustic fireplace.

== See also ==
- National Register of Historic Places listings in Cumberland County, Maine
