= Dyke Mountain Annex =

- U.S. National Register of Historic Places
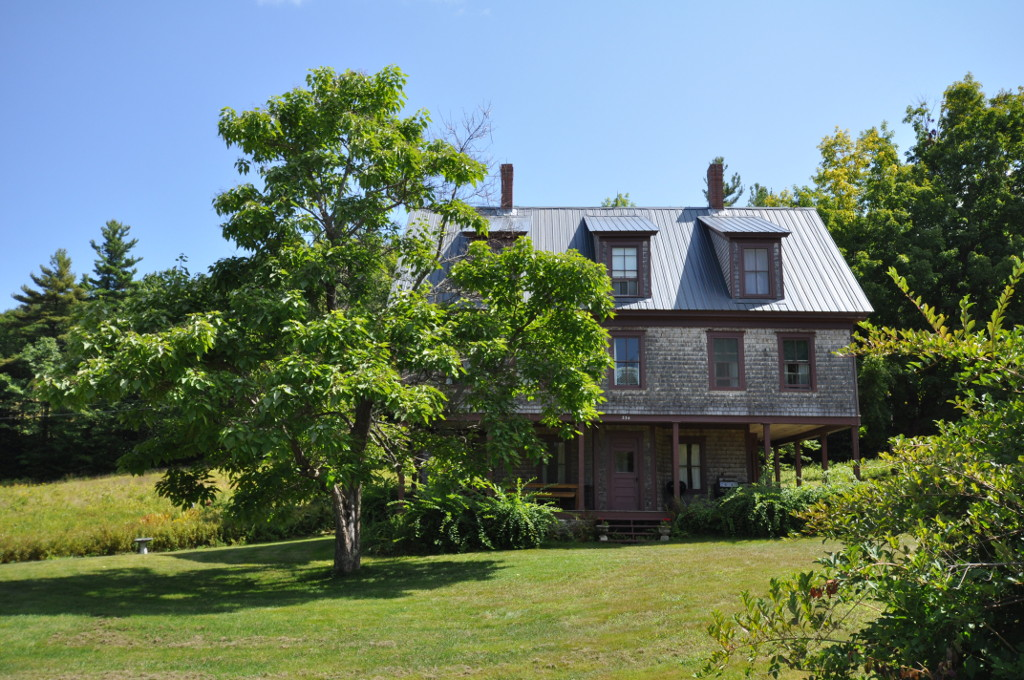

- Location within Maine Location within the United States
- Location: 319 Dyke Mountain Rd., Sebago, Maine
- Coordinates: 43°52′19″N 70°42′37″W
- Area: 5.3 acres (2.1 ha)
- Built: 1928
- Architectural style: Late Victorian, Colonial Revival
- NRHP reference No.: 05000059
- Added to NRHP: February 15, 2005

The Dyke Mountain Annex is a historic house at 319 Dyke Mountain Road in Sebago, Maine. This 2 1/2-story wood-frame house was built sometime between 1906 and 1908 by Grace L. Dike, proprietor of the Dyke Mountain Hotel, a popular summer resort in the hills west of Sebago Lake. It is the only surviving element of the hostelry, the rest of which was destroyed by fire in 1927. This structure originally housed only sleeping and common lounge spaces, but was modified after the fire to have a kitchen, and continued to be operated as a summer hostel by Dike until her death in 1937. It continues to be used as a guest lodging facility by its present owners.

The house is a 2 1/2-story wood-frame structure with a gable roof. An engaged porch wraps around three sides of the building, and the front roof facade is pierced by three shed-roof dormers. The second floor of the front elevation has five sash windows, while the first floor has an asymmetrical recessed face with its entry slightly less recessed than the surrounding exterior walls. The porch, under the overhanging second floor, is supported by chamfered square posts. The kitchen ell is a two-story structure extending to the rear of the main block. The interior of the first floor main block is one large chamber, accessed via doors from a vestibule area, with a stairwell in the southwest and a narrow hall leading to a bathroom and kitchen. There are four bedrooms on the second floor, and two more in the attic space.

The house was listed on the National Register of Historic Places in 2005.

== See also ==
- National Register of Historic Places listings in Cumberland County, Maine
