= Jacob Randall House =

Historic house in Maine, United States

- U.S. National Register of Historic Places
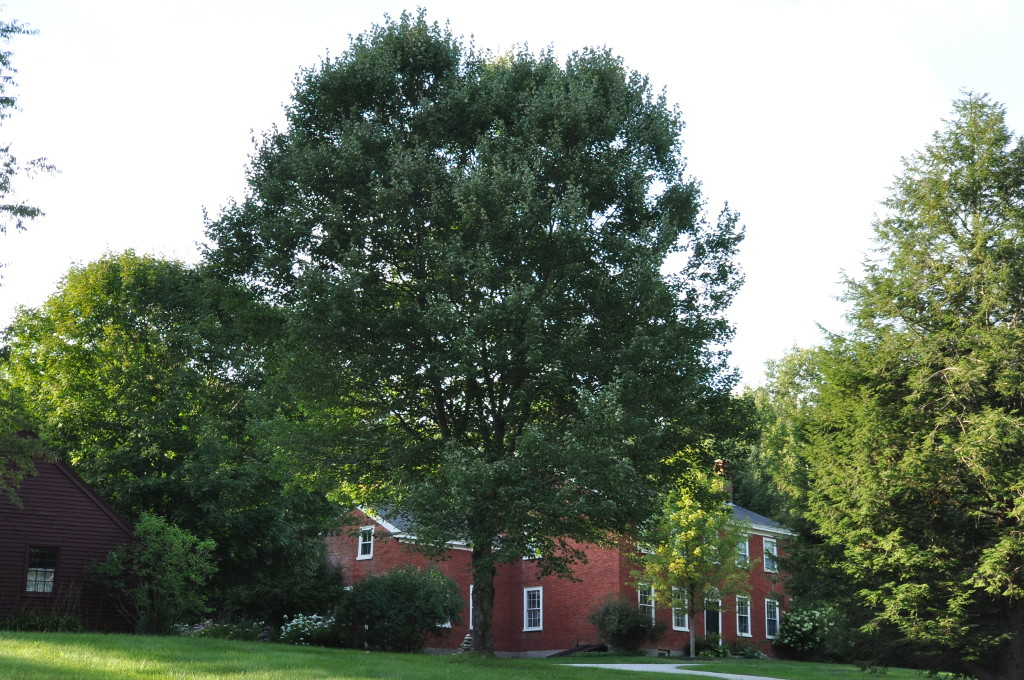

- Location within Maine Location within the United States
- Location: Lawrence Rd., Pownal, Maine
- Coordinates: 43°55′48″N 70°11′32″W
- Area: 1 acre (0.40 ha)
- Built: 1800
- Architectural style: Federal
- NRHP reference No.: 79000144
- Added to NRHP: March 2, 1979

The Jacob Randall House is a historic house on Lawrence Road in Pownal, Maine. Built about 1800, it is a fine local example of Federal period architecture executed in brick. It was built for a prominent local citizen. The house was listed on the National Register of Historic Places in 1979.

== Description and history ==
The Jacob Randall House stands in rural northern Pownal, on the west side of Lawrence Road, the principal north–south road leading from Pownal toward Lewiston. It is a 2 1/2-story brick structure, with a side gable roof, two internal chimneys, and a granite foundation. Its main facade is five bays wide, with its entrance in the central bay, recessed with a fanlight. The sides are two bays wide, and there is a single-story addition extending to the left side of later construction.

In 1796, Jacob Randall, a native of Weymouth, Massachusetts, purchased over 100 acres (40 ha) of land here, and had this house built. His property spanned the nearby Chandler River, which he dammed around 1800, establishing a sawmill and gristmill. When Pownal was incorporated in 1808, Randall was one of its first town selectmen, a seat he held nearly continuously until his death in 1836.

== See also ==
- National Register of Historic Places listings in Cumberland County, Maine
