= Richard Manning House =

Historic house in Maine, United States

- U.S. National Register of Historic Places
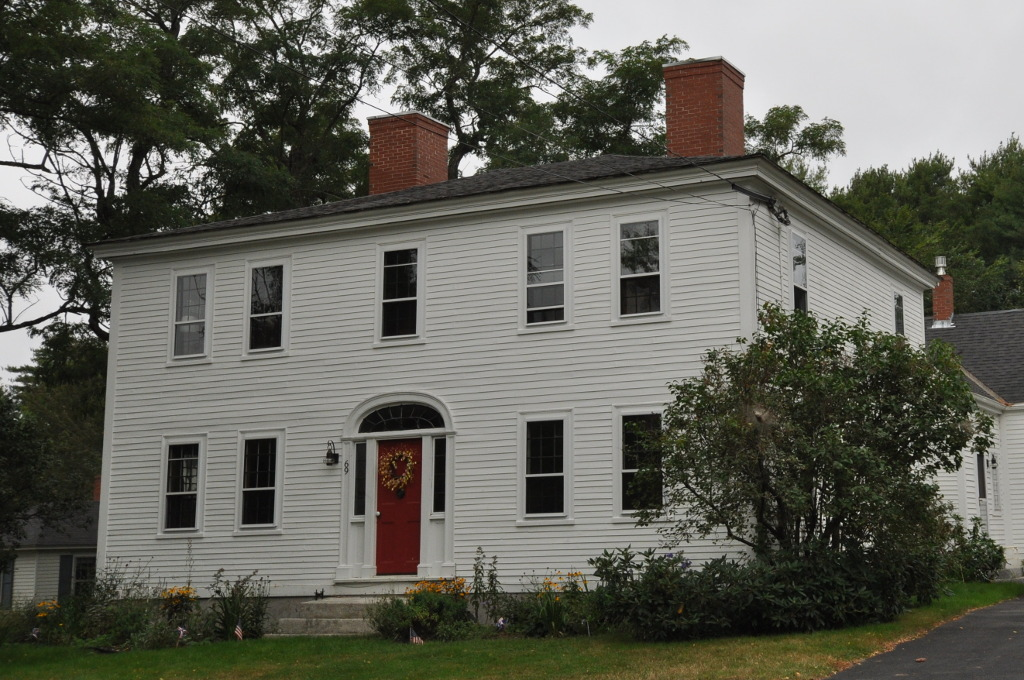

- Location within Maine Location within the United States
- Location: Raymond Cape Rd., W side, 0.3 mi. S of US 302, South Casco, Maine
- Coordinates: 43°54′33″N 70°30′53″W
- Area: 1 acre (0.40 ha)
- Built: 1795
- Architectural style: Federal
- NRHP reference No.: 93000639
- Added to NRHP: July 29, 1993

The Richard Manning House is a historic house on Raymond Cape Road in South Casco, Maine. This well-preserved c. 1795 wood-frame house is an excellent example of Federal architecture. Hawthorne and his mother lived here while Hawthorne's boyhood home was being built by his uncle after his father's death at sea. It is further notable as one of the places where the writer Nathaniel Hawthorne spent some of his childhood years. Richard Manning, a native of Salem, Massachusetts, was Hawthorne's uncle, and the house is located not far from Hawthorne's boyhood home. The house was listed on the National Register of Historic Places in 1993.

== Description and history ==
The Manning House is a two-story wood-frame structure, five bays wide, with a hip roof, and two large interior chimneys. It is joined via a connecting ell in the rear to a barn, and a second ell extends from the side. The main entry is centered on the front (east) facade, and is flanked by sidelight windows and topped by a fanlight window. The interior has a fairly typical Federal period arrangement, with a central hall separating two rooms on each side, with a kitchen behind. In a feature more reminiscent of Salem houses, there is also a small sleeping chamber off to one side of the kitchen.

The house was probably built in 1795 when Richard Manning, son of Richard and Miriam Manning, moved here to manage the family's landholdings after his father's death. Manning's widowed sister, Elizabeth Clarke Manning Hawthorne, moved to a nearby house built for her by the family just over the town line in Raymond. It is unclear how much time the Hawthornes spent in Maine as opposed to Salem, but it appears likely that young Nathaniel would have been a visitor at his uncle's house.

== See also ==
- National Register of Historic Places listings in Cumberland County, Maine
