= Farnsworth House (North Bridgton, Maine) =

Historic house in Maine, United States

- U.S. National Register of Historic Places
- Location within Maine Location within the United States
- Location: SR 117, North Bridgton, Maine
- Coordinates: 44°5′30″N 70°41′56″W
- Area: 0.5 acres (0.20 ha)
- Built: 1825
- Architectural style: Federal
- NRHP reference No.: 80000229
- Added to NRHP: November 14, 1980

The Farnsworth House is a historic house on Maine State Route 117 in North Bridgton, Maine. Built in 1825 for a local doctor, it is a particularly sophisticated example of Federal period architecture for a remote inland setting, featuring well-preserved interior woodwork. It was listed on the National Register of Historic Places in 1980.

== Description and history ==
The Farnsworth House is set on the west side of SR 117, between the Lakewood Pines Campground and the road's junction with North Bridgton Road. It is a 2 1/2-story wood-frame structure, five bays wide, with a side-gable roof, end chimneys, clapboard siding, and stone foundation. The main (east-facing) facade is symmetrically arranged, with a wide central bay housing the main entrance, which is flanked by sidelight windows and topped by a fanlight. A single-story porch extends across the southern facade, supported by Doric columns; it has been partially enclosed. An ell extends to the building rear, joining it to a carriage house. The interior of the house has extremely high-quality delicate Federal period woodwork, including wall paneling, fireplace mantels, crown molding, and a front stairway with paired newel posts.

The house was built in 1825 for Dr. Samuel Farnsworth, Jr. Despite its relatively remote location, the house exhibits interior Federal period woodwork that is comparable to that found in Maine's coastal communities in greater concentration.

== See also ==
- National Register of Historic Places listings in Cumberland County, Maine
