= Valley Lodge (Baldwin, Maine) =

Historic house in Maine, United States

- U.S. National Register of Historic Places
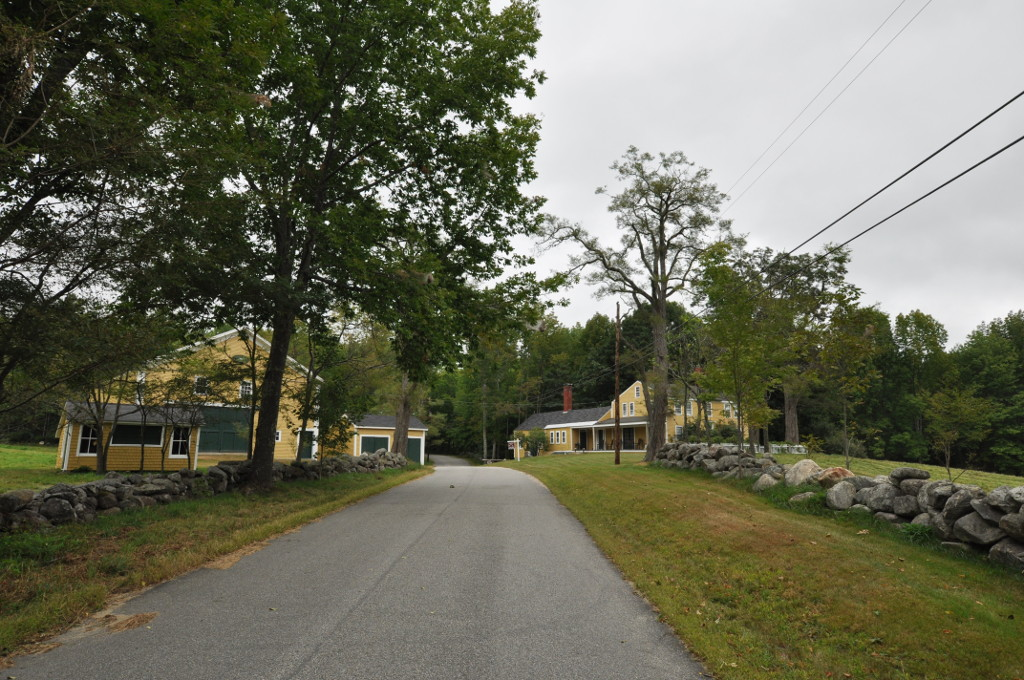

- Location within Maine Location within the United States
- Nearest city: Steep Falls, Maine
- Coordinates: 43°49′44″N 70°42′51″W
- Area: 1 acre (0.40 ha)
- Built: 1792
- Architect: Brown, Ephraim
- Architectural style: Federal
- NRHP reference No.: 77000138
- Added to NRHP: September 19, 1977

Valley Lodge is a historic house on Saddleback Road in rural Baldwin, Maine. Built in 1792 by one of the town's first settlers, it is one of the oldest surviving houses in the rural interior of Cumberland County. It was listed on the National Register of Historic Places in 1977.

== Description and history ==
The Valley Lodge property stands astride Saddleback Road, near the geographic center of Baldwin, a sprawling rural community on the western edge of Cumberland County. The main house is a 2 1/2-story wood-frame structure, with a gabled roof and clapboard siding. A single-story gabled ell extends to the rear of the main block, offset slightly, with a shed-roof porch in the corner created by the offset. It is set on the east side of the road, and is oriented roughly facing south. The front facade is five bays wide, its doors and windows featuring modest Federal period trim. The interior of the house has an unusual floor plan caused by an extensive evolutionary construction history. A 19th-century barn stands on the west side of the road.

Brothers David and Ephraim Brown moved to this area, then wilderness, in 1788, the land having been granted to their father for his service in the American Revolutionary War. Both built houses, of which that of David does not survive, and that of Ephraim is encapsulated in the present structure. He built a 1 1/2-story Cape style house in 1792, but several years later, needing additional space for his growing family, basically built the present 2 1/2-story structure around it, creating an entirely new front facade. The property remained in the hands of Brown's descendants well into the 20th century.

== See also ==
- National Register of Historic Places listings in Cumberland County, Maine
