= National Register of Historic Places listings in Cumberland County, Maine =

Location of Cumberland County in Maine

This is a list of the National Register of Historic Places listings in Cumberland County, Maine.

This is intended to be a complete list of the properties and districts on the National Register of Historic Places in Cumberland County, Maine, United States. Latitude and longitude coordinates are provided for many National Register properties and districts; these locations may be seen together in a map.

There are 251 properties and districts listed on the National Register in the county, including 12 National Historic Landmarks. 151 of these properties and districts, including 5 National Historic Landmarks, are located outside Portland, and are listed here, while the properties and districts in Portland are listed separately. Part of Androscoggin Swinging Bridge is also in Sagadahoc County and is also listed at National Register of Historic Places listings in Sagadahoc County, Maine. Three once-listed properties outside Portland have been removed.

This National Park Service list is complete through NPS recent listings posted September 11, 2026.

Contents: Counties and municipalities in Maine
Androscoggin - Aroostook - Cumberland (City of Portland) - Franklin - Hancock - Kennebec - Knox - Lincoln - Oxford - Penobscot - Piscataquis - Sagadahoc - Somerset - Waldo - Washington - York

== Current listings ==
=== Outside Portland ===
	Name on the Register	Image	Date listed	Location	City or town	Description
1	Academy Building	Academy Building	January 18, 1973 (#73000111)	Gorham campus of the University of Southern Maine; 43°40′55″N 70°26′45″W	Gorham	
2	Lt. Robert Andrews House	Lt. Robert Andrews House	December 21, 2005 (#05001440)	428 S. Bridgton Rd. 43°59′42″N 70°42′27″W	Bridgton	
3	Androscoggin Swinging Bridge	Androscoggin Swinging Bridge	January 14, 2004 (#03001404)	Spanning the Androscoggin River between Topsham and Brunswick; 43°55′06″N 69°58′26″W	Brunswick	
4	Art Gallery	Art Gallery	December 27, 1972 (#72000071)	Gorham campus of the University of Southern Maine at Gorham; 43°40′47″N 70°26′53″W	Gorham	
5	Auburn-Harpswell Association Historic District	Auburn-Harpswell Association Historic District	March 21, 1985 (#85000615)	State Route 123; 43°44′47″N 70°00′46″W	Harpswell	
6	Bailey Island Cobwork Bridge	Bailey Island Cobwork Bridge	April 28, 1975 (#75000093)	On State Route 24 connecting Bailey and Orrs islands 43°44′55″N 69°59′22″W	Harpswell	
7	Bailey Island Library Hall	Bailey Island Library Hall	December 31, 2008 (#08001253)	2167 Harpswell Island Rd. 43°43′57″N 69°59′43″W	Harpswell	
8	Baxter House	Baxter House	June 27, 1979 (#79000135)	South St. 43°40′37″N 70°26′34″W	Gorham	
9	Baxter Summer Home	Baxter Summer Home	December 26, 1985 (#85003155)	Mackworth Island; 43°41′17″N 70°13′59″W	Falmouth	
10	Beckett's Castle		December 31, 1974 (#74000156)	Off State Route 77; 43°36′55″N 70°12′42″W	Cape Elizabeth	
11	Capt. S.C. Blanchard House	Capt. S.C. Blanchard House	May 7, 1979 (#79000136)	317 Main St. 43°48′09″N 70°11′29″W	Yarmouth	Houses the 317 Main Community Music Center
12	Henry Boody House	Henry Boody House	February 24, 1975 (#75000094)	256 Maine St. 43°54′25″N 69°57′57″W	Brunswick	Owned by Bowdoin College.
13	C.A. Brown Cottage	C.A. Brown Cottage	July 30, 1974 (#74000157)	9 Delano Park; 43°37′11″N 70°12′40″W	Cape Elizabeth	
14	Brunswick Commercial Historic District	Brunswick Commercial Historic District	January 12, 2016 (#15000968)	50-151 Maine St. 43°54′57″N 69°57′56″W	Brunswick	
15	Burnell Tavern	Burnell Tavern	December 29, 1983 (#83003638)	State Route 113; 43°50′01″N 70°46′46″W	Baldwin	
16	Camp Hammond	Camp Hammond	February 1, 1979 (#79000137)	74 Main St. 43°48′10″N 70°11′23″W	Yarmouth	
17	Caswell Public Library (Former)	Caswell Public Library (Former)	February 15, 2005 (#05000056)	42 Main St. 44°06′39″N 70°40′50″W	Harrison	
18	Central Fire Station		September 11, 2026 (#100013372)	27 Town Hall Place; 43°54′54″N 69°58′00″W	Brunswick	
19	Central Parish Church	Central Parish Church	June 23, 1988 (#88000892)	146 Main St. 43°47′57″N 70°10′58″W	Yarmouth	
20	Parker Cleaveland House	Parker Cleaveland House	May 16, 2000 (#00000702)	75 Federal St. 43°54′38″N 69°57′36″W	Brunswick	
21	Benjamin Cleaves House	Benjamin Cleaves House	April 20, 1988 (#88000390)	S. High St. 44°02′23″N 70°42′39″W	Bridgton	
22	Cousins Island Chapel	Cousins Island Chapel	June 20, 1997 (#97000605)	Eastern side of Cousins Rd., 1.9 miles southeast of its junction with Morton Rd. 43°45′39″N 70°08′30″W	Yarmouth	
23	Crescent Lodge	Crescent Lodge	June 19, 2018 (#100002591)	1 Wheeler Rd. 43°34′20″N 70°13′14″W	Cape Elizabeth	AKA the Bowery Beach School
24	Crystal Spring Farm	Crystal Spring Farm	April 29, 2004 (#04000369)	277 Pleasant Hill Rd. 43°53′24″N 69°59′49″W	Brunswick	
25	Cumberland and Oxford Canal	Cumberland and Oxford Canal	November 1, 1974 (#74000317)	From Sebago Lake Basin to Conant St. 43°45′05″N 70°25′47″W	Gorham, Standish, Westbrook, and Windham	
26	Cumberland Mills Historic District	Cumberland Mills Historic District	May 2, 1974 (#74000316)	Both sides of the Presumpscot River between railroad tracks and Warren Ave. 43°40′57″N 70°21′10″W	Westbrook	
27	Dalton Holmes Davis Memorial Library	Dalton Holmes Davis Memorial Library	January 5, 1989 (#88003020)	Main St. 44°03′15″N 70°42′37″W	Bridgton	
28	Deertrees Theatre	Deertrees Theatre	January 5, 1989 (#88003002)	Deertrees Rd. 44°07′03″N 70°39′54″W	Harrison	
29	Dow Bridge		June 14, 2022 (#100007807)	Dow Rd. at Josie's Brook, 1/3 mi. northwest of Cape Rd. 43°43′23″N 70°35′38″W	Standish	
30	Dry Mills School	Dry Mills School	December 13, 1996 (#96001495)	Maine Wildlife Park Rd. 43°55′42″N 70°21′00″W	Gray	
31	John Dunlap House	John Dunlap House	June 14, 1979 (#79000138)	4 Oak St. 43°55′02″N 69°58′08″W	Brunswick	
32	Deacon Andrew Dunning House	Deacon Andrew Dunning House	October 8, 1999 (#99001188)	Mountain Rd., 0.6 miles southeast of its junction with State Route 123; 43°49′01″N 69°57′23″W	Harpswell	
33	Dunstan Methodist Episcopal Church	Dunstan Methodist Episcopal Church	July 13, 1989 (#89000839)	U.S. Route 1; 43°34′02″N 70°23′27″W	Scarborough	
34	Isaac W. Dyer Estate	Isaac W. Dyer Estate	April 1, 1998 (#98000307)	180 Fort Hill Rd. 43°41′18″N 70°26′56″W	Gorham	Misspelled "Isaac E. Dyer Estate" in the National Register
35	Dyer-Hutchinson Farm	Dyer-Hutchinson Farm	April 14, 1997 (#97000313)	1148 Sawyer Rd. 43°36′18″N 70°15′48″W	Cape Elizabeth	
36	Dyke Mountain Annex	Dyke Mountain Annex	February 15, 2005 (#05000059)	319 Dyke Mountain Rd. 43°52′19″N 70°42′37″W	Sebago	
37	Eagle Island	Eagle Island	November 23, 1971 (#71000069)	South of Harpswell on Eagle Island; 43°42′41″N 70°03′23″W	Harpswell	
38	East Harpswell Free Will Baptist Church	East Harpswell Free Will Baptist Church	June 23, 1988 (#88000888)	Cundys Harbor Rd. 43°50′03″N 69°53′56″W	Harpswell	
39	East Raymond Union Chapel	East Raymond Union Chapel	April 28, 2004 (#04000370)	394 Webbs Mills Rd. 43°56′02″N 70°26′29″W	Raymond	
40	Falmouth High School	Falmouth High School	January 12, 2016 (#15000967)	192 Middle Rd. 43°43′26″N 70°14′42″W	Falmouth	Most recently known as the Plummer-Motz School
41	Falmouth House	Falmouth House	September 1, 1976 (#76000091)	349 Gray Rd. 43°46′21″N 70°18′04″W	Falmouth	
42	Farnsworth House		November 14, 1980 (#80000229)	State Route 117; 44°05′30″N 70°41′56″W	Bridgton	
43	Federal Street Historic District	Federal Street Historic District	October 29, 1976 (#76000092)	Roughly bounded by Mason, Maine, College, and Federal Sts. 43°54′45″N 69°57′45″W	Brunswick	
44	First Parish Church	First Parish Church	December 2, 1969 (#69000008)	207 Maine St. 43°54′38″N 69°57′47″W	Brunswick	
45	First Parish Congregational Church	First Parish Congregational Church	June 20, 1995 (#95000728)	135 Main St. 43°47′55″N 70°11′04″W	Yarmouth	
46	First Parish Meetinghouse	First Parish Meetinghouse	March 27, 1975 (#75000204)	Oak Hill Rd. 43°44′17″N 70°33′21″W	Standish	
47	Fitch's General Store and House	Fitch's General Store and House	March 10, 1995 (#95000215)	Eastern side of Long Hill Rd. at its junction with State Route 114; 43°51′26″N 70°38′32″W	Sebago	
48	Freeman Farm Historic District	Freeman Farm Historic District	July 10, 2003 (#03000621)	342 W. Gray Rd. 43°51′18″N 70°23′08″W	Gray	
49	Freeport Main Street Historic District	Freeport Main Street Historic District	November 16, 1977 (#77000064)	Main St. 43°51′22″N 70°06′19″W	Freeport	Main Street (US 1) between Holbrook and Nathan Nye Streets.
50	Friends Meetinghouse	Friends Meetinghouse	September 9, 1975 (#75000095)	Quaker Ridge; 43°58′12″N 70°31′56″W	Casco	
51	Goold House	Goold House	August 10, 1990 (#89000251)	280 Windham Center Rd. 43°47′11″N 70°24′09″W	Windham	
52	Gorham Campus Historic District	Gorham Campus Historic District	May 5, 1978 (#78000171)	College Ave. 43°40′51″N 70°26′47″W	Gorham	
53	Gorham Historic District	Gorham Historic District	October 2, 1992 (#92001298)	Roughly bounded by College, Church, Cross, State, and Maple Sts., including School St. from State to north of Church; 43°40′46″N 70°26′44″W	Gorham	
54	Grand Trunk Railroad Station	Grand Trunk Railroad Station	July 10, 1979 (#79000139)	State Route 115; 43°48′06″N 70°11′28″W	Yarmouth	
55	Great Chebeague Golf Club		July 14, 2015 (#15000416)	16 Stone Wharf Rd. 43°45′07″N 70°06′18″W	Chebeague Island	
56	Great Falls Historic District	Great Falls Historic District	January 12, 1995 (#94001541)	Along Windham Center Rd., east of the Presumpscot River; 43°48′09″N 70°26′49″W	Windham	
57	Greene Cottage		September 30, 2019 (#100004472)	516 Basin Point Rd. 43°44′22″N 70°02′29″W	Harpswell	
58	Halfway Rock Light Station	Halfway Rock Light Station	March 14, 1988 (#88000150)	Casco Bay off Bailey Island; 43°39′21″N 70°02′14″W	Harpswell	
59	Hall's Tavern	Hall's Tavern	March 30, 1978 (#78000172)	West of Falmouth at 377 Gray Rd. 43°46′38″N 70°18′09″W	Falmouth	
60	Harpswell Meetinghouse	Harpswell Meetinghouse	November 24, 1968 (#68000014)	Harpswell Center on State Route 123, 9 miles south of Brunswick; 43°47′56″N 69°59′15″W	Harpswell	
61	Harraseeket Historic District	Harraseeket Historic District	June 28, 1974 (#74000160)	Roughly both sides of the Harraseeket River, including South Freeport, Porters Landing, and Mast Landing; 43°49′36″N 70°05′40″W	Freeport	
62	Nathan Harris House	Nathan Harris House	October 14, 1993 (#93001116)	425 Main St. 43°40′53″N 70°20′55″W	Westbrook	
63	Nathaniel Hawthorne Boyhood Home	Nathaniel Hawthorne Boyhood Home	December 2, 1969 (#69000030)	Hawthorne and Raymond Cape Rds. 43°54′22″N 70°30′47″W	Raymond	
64	Winslow Homer Studio	Winslow Homer Studio	October 15, 1966 (#66000092)	Winslow Homer Rd., Prouts Neck; 43°31′42″N 70°19′13″W	Scarborough	
65	Richard Hunniwell House	Richard Hunniwell House	May 12, 1976 (#76000093)	West of Scarborough at Winnock's Neck and Old County Rds. 43°34′50″N 70°19′55″W	Scarborough	
66	Intervale Farm	Intervale Farm	January 14, 2004 (#03001407)	1047 Intervale Rd. 43°55′39″N 70°15′06″W	New Gloucester	
67	Elijah Kellogg Church	Elijah Kellogg Church	June 27, 1979 (#79000140)	State Route 123; 43°47′59″N 69°59′12″W	Harpswell	
68	Elijah Kellogg House	Elijah Kellogg House	April 28, 1975 (#75000096)	North of North Harpswell off State Route 123; 43°50′06″N 69°58′03″W	Harpswell	
69	Lakeside Grange #63	Lakeside Grange #63	October 19, 2005 (#05001173)	Main St. at its junction with Lincoln St. 44°06′37″N 70°40′54″W	Harrison	
70	Lincoln Street Historic District	Lincoln Street Historic District	December 12, 1976 (#76000094)	Lincoln St. between Main and Union Sts. 43°55′00″N 69°58′03″W	Brunswick	
71	Little Mark Island Monument	Little Mark Island Monument	June 7, 2016 (#16000338)	N. Casco Bay at mouth of Merriconeag Sound; 43°42′33″N 70°01′53″W	Harpswell	
72	Stephen Longfellow House	Stephen Longfellow House	March 22, 1984 (#84001365)	Longfellow Rd. 43°40′07″N 70°23′54″W	Gorham	
73	Mallett Hall	Mallett Hall	October 16, 1991 (#91001511)	Eastern side of State Route 9 north of Dyer Rd. 43°53′34″N 70°11′03″W	Pownal Center	Pownal's town hall
74	E.B. Mallett Office Building	E.B. Mallett Office Building	February 19, 1982 (#82000747)	Mill St. 43°51′22″N 70°06′13″W	Freeport	
75	Richard Manning House	Richard Manning House	July 29, 1993 (#93000639)	Western side of Raymond Cape Rd. 0.3 miles south of U.S. Route 302; 43°54′33″N 70°30′53″W	Casco	
76	Manor House	Manor House	July 12, 1978 (#78000173)	U.S. Route 302; 43°58′47″N 70°37′37″W	Naples	
77	Maplewood Farm	Maplewood Farm	December 13, 1991 (#91001813)	River Rd. southeast of its junction with Webber Rd. 43°42′47″N 70°23′34″W	Windham	
78	Daniel Marrett House	Daniel Marrett House	February 15, 1974 (#74000314)	On State Route 25; 43°43′55″N 70°33′05″W	Standish	
79	Massachusetts Hall, Bowdoin College	Massachusetts Hall, Bowdoin College	July 27, 1971 (#71000042)	Bowdoin College campus 43°54′35″N 69°57′44″W	Brunswick	
80	McLellan House	McLellan House	December 5, 1972 (#72000073)	140 School St. 43°41′06″N 70°26′49″W	Gorham	
81	Merriconeag Grange No. 425	Merriconeag Grange No. 425	May 31, 2019 (#100004068)	529 Harpswell Neck Rd. 43°49′19″N 69°57′54″W	Harpswell	
82	Merriconegan Farm	Merriconegan Farm	June 15, 1979 (#79000269)	State Route 123; 43°51′16″N 69°56′58″W	Harpswell	
83	Capt. Reuben Merrill House	Capt. Reuben Merrill House	July 12, 1974 (#74000313)	233 W. Main St. 43°48′14″N 70°12′15″W	Yarmouth	
84	Capt. Reuel and Lucy Merrill House	Capt. Reuel and Lucy Merrill House	April 14, 1999 (#99000378)	66 Winn Rd. 43°46′46″N 70°15′34″W	Cumberland Center	
85	Mitchell House	Mitchell House	January 20, 1978 (#78000325)	333 Main St. 43°48′11″N 70°11′32″W	Yarmouth	
86	New Gloucester Historic District	New Gloucester Historic District	November 13, 1974 (#74000162)	Both sides of SR 231, Gloucester Hill Rd., Cobbs Bridge Rd. 43°57′41″N 70°16′58″W	New Gloucester	
87	North Yarmouth Academy	North Yarmouth Academy	March 4, 1975 (#75000097)	On State Route 115; 43°48′00″N 70°11′04″W	Yarmouth	Russell Hall and Academy Hall on the NYA campus
88	North Yarmouth and Freeport Baptist Meetinghouse	North Yarmouth and Freeport Baptist Meetinghouse	November 20, 1978 (#78000174)	Hillside St. 43°48′13″N 70°11′46″W	Yarmouth	
89	Norton House Historic District	Norton House Historic District	January 28, 2004 (#03001501)	241 and 243 Foreside Rd. 43°43′54″N 70°12′36″W	Falmouth	
90	Orr's Island Meeting House		September 15, 2022 (#100008122)	1579 Harpswell Islands Rd., Orr's Island; 43°46′08″N 69°58′16″W	Harpswell	
91	Paine Neighborhood Historic District	Paine Neighborhood Historic District	April 11, 1985 (#85000731)	State Route 113; 43°44′27″N 70°36′05″W	Standish	
92	Payson House at Thornhurst	Payson House at Thornhurst	February 15, 2005 (#05000057)	48 Thornhurst Rd. 43°42′56″N 70°13′07″W	Falmouth	
93	Peabody-Fitch House	Peabody-Fitch House	April 7, 1989 (#89000254)	Off Ingalls Rd. 43°58′59″N 70°43′28″W	Bridgton	
94	Pennell Institute	Pennell Institute	July 12, 1982 (#82000750)	Lewiston Rd. 43°53′16″N 70°19′41″W	Gray	Now houses town offices
95	Pennellville Historic District	Pennellville Historic District	October 10, 1985 (#85002923)	Roughly bounded by Pennellville Rd., Middle Bay Cove, and Pennell Way; 43°51′42″N 69°57′40″W	Brunswick	
96	Sam Perley Farm	Sam Perley Farm	July 10, 1979 (#79000143)	Perley Rd. 43°59′09″N 70°39′47″W	Naples	
97	William F. Perry House	William F. Perry House	September 25, 1975 (#75000098)	32 Main St. 44°03′17″N 70°42′52″W	Bridgton	
98	Pettengill House and Farm	Pettengill House and Farm	October 6, 1970 (#70000041)	South of Bow St. 43°51′01″N 70°04′55″W	Freeport	
99	Portland Breakwater Light	Portland Breakwater Light	June 19, 1973 (#73000238)	Northeastern end of the Portland Breakwater in Portland Harbor; 43°39′19″N 70°14′07″W	South Portland	
100	Portland Head Light	Portland Head Light	April 24, 1973 (#73000121)	Portland Head off Shore Rd. 43°37′23″N 70°12′29″W	Cape Elizabeth	
101	Portland Railroad Company Substation	Portland Railroad Company Substation	March 22, 1991 (#91000320)	U.S. Route 1; 43°34′06″N 70°23′31″W	Scarborough	
102	Capt. Greenfield Pote House	Capt. Greenfield Pote House	October 6, 1970 (#70000042)	Wolf Neck Rd. 43°49′49″N 70°04′58″W	Freeport	
103	Pownal Cattle Pound	Pownal Cattle Pound	July 28, 2004 (#04000745)	Hallowell Rd., Bradbury Mountain State Park, 0.7 miles north of its junction with Dyer Rd. 43°54′06″N 70°10′41″W	Pownal	
104	Cushing and Hannah Prince House	Cushing and Hannah Prince House	July 1, 1999 (#99000772)	189 Greely Rd. 43°47′50″N 70°13′25″W	Yarmouth	
105	Proprietors Meeting House and Parish House	Proprietors Meeting House and Parish House	August 2, 2001 (#01000813)	Junction of State Route 22 and Old County Rd. 43°37′14″N 70°28′45″W	South Buxton (Scarborough side)	
106	Elisha Purington House	Elisha Purington House	February 14, 1985 (#85000271)	71 Mast Rd. 43°45′52″N 70°20′38″W	Falmouth	
107	Ram Island Ledge Light Station	Ram Island Ledge Light Station	March 14, 1988 (#88000157)	Ram Island Ledge in Portland Harbor; 43°37′53″N 70°11′16″W	Cape Elizabeth	
108	Jacob Randall House	Jacob Randall House	March 2, 1979 (#79000144)	Lawrence Rd. 43°55′48″N 70°11′32″W	Pownal	
109	Amos O. Reed House		September 18, 2025 (#100012234)	19 High Street; 43°54′57″N 69°58′17″W	Brunswick	
110	Richardson House	Richardson House	May 16, 1974 (#74000165)	11 Lincoln St. 43°54′42″N 69°58′12″W	Brunswick	
111	Richmond's Island Archeological Site	Richmond's Island Archeological Site	November 2, 1978 (#78000175)	most of Richmond Island; 43°32′38″N 70°14′05″W	Cape Elizabeth	
112	Ryefield Bridge	Ryefield Bridge	September 24, 1999 (#99001193)	Ryefield Bridge Road over the Crooked River; 44°08′34″N 70°35′43″W	Harrison	Extends into Oxford County
113	St. Hyacinth School and Convent	St. Hyacinth School and Convent	June 25, 2013 (#13000439)	2 Walker Street; 43°40′49″N 70°21′55″W	Westbrook	
114	St. Paul's Episcopal Church	St. Paul's Episcopal Church	January 31, 1978 (#78000177)	27 Pleasant St. 43°54′49″N 69°58′06″W	Brunswick	
115	Scarborough High School	Scarborough High School	June 27, 2007 (#07000595)	272 U.S. Route 1; 43°35′19″N 70°20′28″W	Scarborough	
116	Scribner Homestead	Scribner Homestead	April 12, 2001 (#01000368)	244 Scribner's Mill Rd. 44°05′10″N 70°36′22″W	Harrison	
117	Seavey-Robinson House	Seavey-Robinson House	September 11, 1986 (#86002468)	580 Ocean St. 43°37′22″N 70°14′57″W	South Portland	
118	Shaker Village	Shaker Village	September 13, 1974 (#74000318)	State Route 26; 43°59′22″N 70°21′59″W	New Gloucester	Extends into Androscoggin County
119	Thomas Skelton House	Thomas Skelton House	May 7, 1973 (#73000124)	124 U.S. Route 1; 43°42′28″N 70°14′14″W	Falmouth	
120	Parson Smith House	Parson Smith House	July 16, 1973 (#73000237)	Southeast of South Windham on River Rd. 43°42′58″N 70°23′33″W	Windham	
121	Songo Lock	Songo Lock	February 16, 1970 (#70000093)	South of Naples off State Route 114; 43°55′55″N 70°34′48″W	Naples	
122	South Bridgton Congregational Church	South Bridgton Congregational Church	June 25, 1987 (#87000947)	Fosterville Rd. 43°59′19″N 70°42′23″W	Bridgton	
123	South Street Historic District	South Street Historic District	April 20, 1988 (#88000398)	South St. between Green and Morrill; 43°40′37″N 70°26′29″W	Gorham	
124	Southgate Farm	Southgate Farm	March 26, 2018 (#100002225)	577 US 1; 43°34′24″N 70°23′04″W	Scarborough	
125	Spring Point Ledge Light Station	Spring Point Ledge Light Station	January 21, 1988 (#87002279)	Spring Point Ledge in Portland Harbor; 43°39′07″N 70°13′28″W	South Portland	
126	Spurwink Congregational Church	Spurwink Congregational Church	May 19, 1970 (#70000044)	Spurwink Ave. 43°34′47″N 70°15′08″W	Cape Elizabeth	
127	Standish Corner Historic District	Standish Corner Historic District	October 14, 1993 (#93001117)	Junction of State Routes 25/113 and 35; 43°44′06″N 70°33′03″W	Standish	
128	State Reform School Historic District	State Reform School Historic District	April 11, 1985 (#85000730)	Westbrook St. 43°38′14″N 70°18′24″W	South Portland	
129	Steep Falls Library	Steep Falls Library	January 15, 2004 (#03001406)	1128 Pequawket Trail; 43°47′32″N 70°39′03″W	Steep Falls	
130	Stimson Memorial Hall	Stimson Memorial Hall	October 2, 1992 (#92001296)	Eastern side of State Route 26, 0.5 miles north of its junction with U.S. Route 202; 43°53′11″N 70°19′52″W	Gray	
131	Stone House	Stone House	July 19, 1984 (#84001361)	Burnham Rd. 44°00′02″N 70°40′38″W	Bridgton	
132	Capt. Johnson H. Stover Jr. House	Capt. Johnson H. Stover Jr. House	June 20, 2018 (#100002592)	1691 Harpswell Neck Rd. 43°45′11″N 70°00′32″W	Harpswell	
133	Harriet Beecher Stowe House	Harriet Beecher Stowe House	October 15, 1966 (#66000091)	63 Federal St. 43°54′46″N 69°57′39″W	Brunswick	
134	Tarr-Eaton House	Tarr-Eaton House	December 31, 2001 (#01001416)	906 Harpswell Neck Rd. 43°48′02″N 69°59′14″W	Harpswell Center	
135	Two Lights	Two Lights	December 27, 1974 (#74000167)	Off State Route 77; 43°33′55″N 70°12′05″W	Cape Elizabeth	
136	Union Church	Union Church	June 24, 1994 (#94000638)	Southern side of U.S. Route 302, 0.1 miles west of its junction with State Routes 11/114; 43°58′11″N 70°36′25″W	Naples	
137	Union Church	Union Church	June 28, 1988 (#88000889)	State Route 123; 43°49′14″N 69°58′00″W	Harpswell	
138	Union Hotel	Union Hotel	September 12, 1985 (#85002179)	926 Cundy's Harbor Rd. 43°47′32″N 69°53′36″W	Harpswell	Now the Captain's Watch B&B.
139	Universalist Meeting House	Universalist Meeting House	June 23, 1988 (#88000887)	State Route 231 in Intervale; 43°55′24″N 70°14′54″W	New Gloucester	
140	Vallee Family House	Vallee Family House	October 13, 1988 (#88001853)	36 Monroe Ave. 43°40′27″N 70°21′32″W	Westbrook	
141	Valley Lodge	Valley Lodge	September 19, 1977 (#77000138)	Saddleback Mountain Rd. 43°49′44″N 70°42′51″W	Baldwin	Listed in Steep Falls.
142	Wales and Hamblen Store	Wales and Hamblen Store	June 14, 1990 (#90000924)	134 Main St. 44°03′15″N 70°42′11″W	Bridgton	
143	Walker Memorial Hall	Walker Memorial Hall	December 29, 1983 (#83003639)	Lower Ridge Rd. 44°04′50″N 70°43′31″W	Bridgton	
144	Walker Memorial Library	Walker Memorial Library	November 10, 1980 (#80000231)	800 Main St. 43°40′34″N 70°21′51″W	Westbrook	
145	Walking Man Sign	Walking Man Sign	May 31, 2019 (#100004069)	10 Hardy Rd. 43°44′38″N 70°21′18″W	Westbrook	A locally iconic roadside sign.
146	Warren Block	Warren Block	November 5, 1974 (#74000315)	Main St. 43°40′53″N 70°20′55″W	Westbrook	
147	Watkins House and Cabins	Watkins House and Cabins	July 2, 1992 (#92000792)	Junction of U.S. Route 302 and Raymond Cape Rd. 43°54′43″N 70°31′01″W	Casco	
148	John and Maria Webb House	John and Maria Webb House	October 16, 2013 (#13000834)	121 Main St. 44°03′15″N 70°42′34″W	Bridgton	
149	Westbrook High School	Westbrook High School	November 27, 1979 (#79000146)	765 Main St. 43°40′36″N 70°21′46″W	Westbrook	Old Westbrook High School is now senior housing
150	Whittier Field Athletic Complex	Whittier Field Athletic Complex	June 26, 2017 (#100001238)	Roughly bounded by Harpswell Rd., Bowker & Pine Sts. 43°54′28″N 69°57′16″W	Brunswick	
151	Winn Road School	Winn Road School	March 22, 1984 (#84001364)	Winn Rd. 43°46′41″N 70°15′37″W	Cumberland Center	

== Former listings ==
	Name on the Register	Image	Date listed	Date removed	Location	City or town	Description
1	Atlantic House		July 10, 1979 (#79000134)	October 13, 1989	S of Scarborough on Kirkwood Rd.	Scarborough	Demolished in 1988.
2	Babb's Bridge	Babb's Bridge	September 7, 1972 (#09000088)	March 21, 2023	Over the Presumpscot River, west of River Rd. and east of Cane Rd. 43°45′58″N 70°26′53″W	Gorham	Destroyed by arsonist on May 6, 1973. Current bridge is a replica built in 1976.
3	Barrows-Scribner Mill	Barrows-Scribner Mill	March 26, 1976 (#76000090)	August 1, 1986	Southeast of Harrison on Scribner's Mill Rd. 44°05′08″N 70°36′21″W	Harrison	Extensively damaged by flooding and heavy snow; has been partially rebuilt
4	Percival P. Baxter House		April 23, 1973 (#73002282)	December 1, 1973	61 Deering St.	Gorham	Birthplace of Percival Proctor Baxter, 53rd Governor of Maine.
5	Friends School	Friends School	June 24, 1996 (#96000650)	December 21, 2020	Behind the town offices on State Route 121; 44°00′15″N 70°31′24″W	Casco	Destroyed by arsonists in 2018.

== See also ==
- List of National Historic Landmarks in Maine
- National Register of Historic Places listings in Maine
