= Hall's Tavern (Falmouth, Maine) =

- U.S. National Register of Historic Places
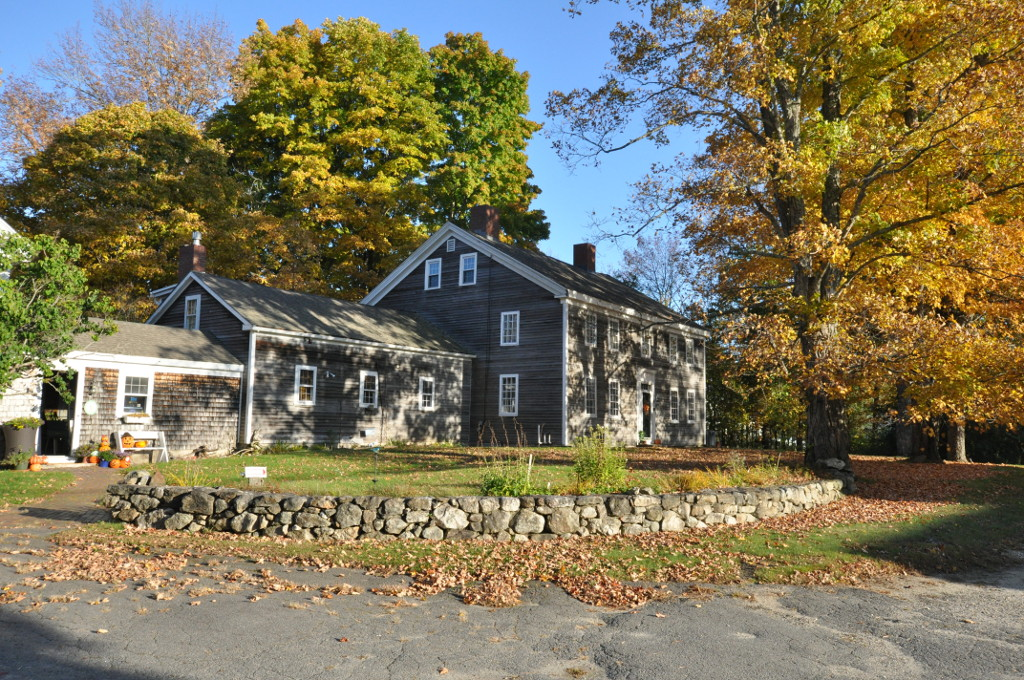

- Location within Maine Location within the United States
- Location: 377 Gray Rd., Falmouth, Maine
- Coordinates: 43°46′38″N 70°18′9″W
- Area: 1 acre (0.40 ha)
- Architectural style: Federal
- NRHP reference No.: 78000172
- Added to NRHP: March 30, 1978

Hall's Tavern, also once known as the Falmouth Tavern, and now the Quaker Tavern B&B and Inn, is an historic tavern at 377 Gray Road in Falmouth, Maine. Built about 1800 as a private home, it served for many years of the 19th century as a traveler accommodation, and is one of Falmouth's few surviving buildings of the period. It was listed on the National Register of Historic Places in 1978.

== Description and history ==
Hall's Tavern is located in rural northern Falmouth, on the east side of Gray Road (Maine State Route 100), between Kimball Way and Hurricane Road. It is a 2 1/2-story wood-frame structure, with a side-gable roof, twin interior chimneys, clapboard siding, and a granite foundation. Telescoping additions extend to the north, joining the house to a clapboarded barn. The main block is five bays wide, with a center entrance framed by Doric pilasters and topped by a four-light transom window and entablature. The interior of the house retains impressive Federal period woodwork and finishes. The tavern taproom, to the right of the entrance, retains original plaster walls with stencilwork stylistically similar to that of the early 18th-century itinerant artist Moses Eaton.

The tavern was built about 1800 by Nicholas Hall, a farmer originally from Dover, New Hampshire. The house was in the Hall extended family for most of the 19th century, and was probably converted into a tavern by Nicholas Hall's son Ozni, who acquired the property in 1823. The house was moved c. 1826–27, when the present Gray Road alignment was made, which may also be when it was made into a tavern. It is now home to a bed and breakfast accommodation.

== See also ==
- National Register of Historic Places listings in Cumberland County, Maine
