= Soldier's Monument =

Soldier's Monument may refer to:

== United States ==
=== Connecticut ===
- Soldiers' Monument in Bristol, Connecticut, a brownstone obelisk in West Cemetery (1866)

=== Illinois ===
- Soldier's Monument (Byron, Illinois), in Ogle County (1866)
- The Soldiers' Monument (Oregon, Illinois), in the Oregon Commercial Historic District (1916)

=== Iowa ===
- Soldier's Monument (Davenport, Iowa), in the College Square Historic District (1880)

=== Kansas ===
- Soldiers' Monument (Osawatomie, Kansas), listed on the National Register of Historic Places in Miami County, Kansas

=== Kentucky ===
- Colored Soldiers Monument in Frankfort, Franklin County
- Confederate Soldiers Martyrs Monument in Eminence, Henry County
- Confederate Soldier Monument in Caldwell Caldwell County
- Confederate Soldier Monument in Lexington, Fayette County
- Unknown Confederate Soldier Monument in Horse Cave, Hart County

=== Maine ===
- Soldiers' Monument (Bridgton, Maine), in Cumberland County (1910)

=== Massachusetts ===
- Soldiers' monument (Dover, Massachusetts), Dover, Massachusetts, 1910
- Soldiers Monument in Pittsfield, Massachusetts

=== New Mexico ===
- Soldiers' Monument (Santa Fe, New Mexico), in Santa Fe County (1866-8)

=== New York ===
- Washington Avenue Soldier's Monument and Triangle, Rockland County (1921)

=== Pennsylvania ===
- Soldiers' National Monument, in the Gettysburg National Cemetery (1869), Gettysburg, Pennsylvania

== See also ==
- Soldiers' and Sailors' Monument (disambiguation)
