= Rufus Porter (painter) =

American painter

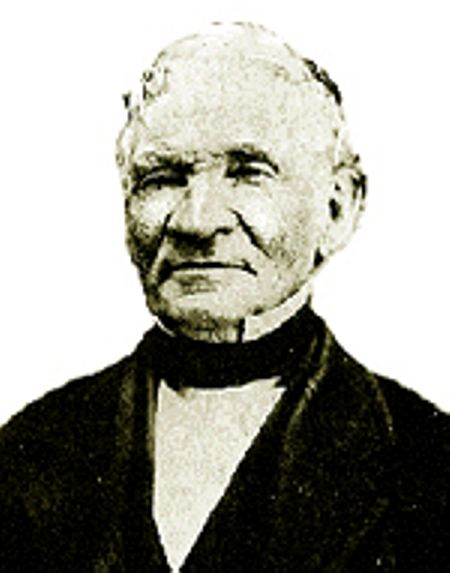
Rufus Porter

Rufus Porter water color wall mural

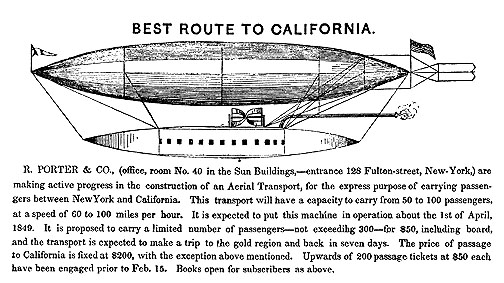
Rufus Porter advertisement for his 1849 New York to California transport

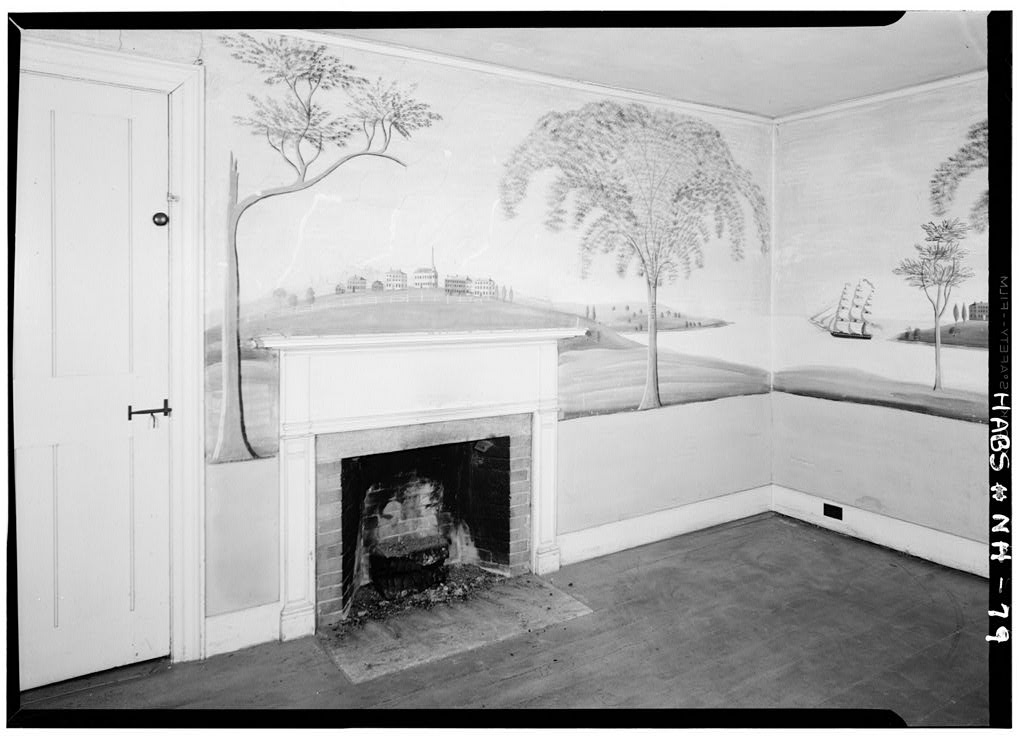
Rufus Porter mural in the Kent House, Lyme, New Hampshire

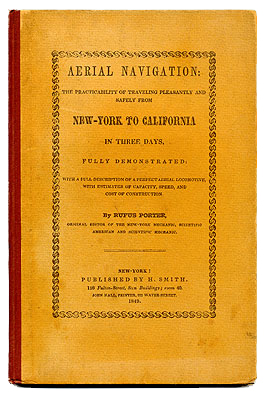
Title page of Porter's pamphlet of 1849

Rufus Porter (May 1, 1792 – August 13, 1884) was an American painter, inventor, and founder of Scientific American magazine.

== Early life and education ==
Porter descended from an old colonial New England family. The family's first immigrants to the U.S. were Mary and John Porter (c. 1600–1676) who emigrated from Dorset, England, to Salem, Massachusetts in the early 17th century. When John died in 1676 he was the largest landowner around, owning property that included the modern cities of Salem, Danvers, Wenham, Beverly, Topsfield and Boxford, Massachusetts.

Later descendants included Benjamin Porter, who was Rufus' great-grandfather. Benjamin moved to West Boxford in 1716 and became the wealthiest man there. His descendants include ministers, doctors, lawyers, merchants, an army colonel, a ship's captain, a professor of mathematics and several legislative members. He was related by marriage to Henry Wadsworth Longfellow, the Honorable Rufus King (minister to England) and Harriet Porter Beecher, stepmother of Harriet Beecher Stowe. The family farm descended to Abigail and Tyler Porter, parents of Rufus Porter.

Porter was born in West Boxford, Massachusetts. He was one of six children. His father was Tyler Porter and his mother was Abigail Johnson. Rufus started school at age 4. The family farm was sold in 1801 and the family moved to Maine when Rufus was 9 years old. They lived in Pleasant Mountain Gore, now part of Denmark. At age 12 Rufus attended the Fryeburg Academy for six months.

In 1807, he was apprenticed to a shoemaker.

== Marriage ==
In 1815 Rufus married Eunice Twombly (c. 1795–1848) of Portland, Maine, and they had ten children together, including: Stephen Twombly Porter (1816–1850); Rufus King Porter (1820–1903); Sylvanus Frederick Porter (1823–?); John Randolph Porter (1825–?); Edward Leroy Porter (1827–?); Nancy Adams Porter (1829–1877); Ellen Augusta Porter (1831–?); and Washington Irving Porter (1834–1836).

== Travel ==
By 1816, Porter was living in New Haven, Connecticut, where he had a dancing school and began painting portraits. In 1818 and 1819 he made a trading voyage to the Pacific Northwest and Hawaii, and in 1819 Porter had returned to painting. He traveled by coach and on foot, painting portraits throughout New York, New Jersey, Maryland, and Virginia. He became a prolific muralist between 1825 and 1845, decorating some 160 houses and inns in Connecticut, Massachusetts, Maine, New Hampshire, Vermont, and as far south as Virginia. From simple silhouettes to scenes of entire towns or harbors, Porter spread his art throughout New England. His murals were generally executed in a large scale on dry plaster walls by a combination of freehand painting and stenciling. Some murals were in full color, others in monochrome, with the foliage sometimes stamped in with a cork stopper instead of being painted with a brush. Often he would do portraits of the principal household members where he was doing the murals.

== Second marriage ==
In 1849, he married Emma Tallman Edgar (1820–?) of Roxbury, Massachusetts, and fathered an additional six children. All the children died in infancy except Rufus Frank Porter (1859–?), also known as Frank Rufus Porter.

== Inventor ==
During much of this time, and afterwards, Porter was a prolific inventor. His obituary described his "long career of usefulness as an inventor of turbine water wheels, windmills, flying ships, rotary engines, and sundry contrivances for abolishing as far as possible agricultural labor."

During 1825 and 1826 he published four editions of A Select Collection of Valuable and Curious Arts, and Interesting Experiments. He built a portable camera obscura that let him make silhouette portraits in less than 15 minutes. (He charged 20 cents apiece for them.) He experimented with a wind-powered gristmill, a washing machine, a corn sheller, a fire alarm, a rope-making machine, and a camera. He invented clocks, railway signals, churns, a distance measuring appliance, a horsepower mechanism, a churn, a life preserver, a cheese press, and a revolving rifle.

Porter was noted as missing opportunities to turn his inventions into commercial success. He invented the revolving rifle but sold the rights to Samuel Colt for $100, and the design was permanently shelved.

== Scientific American ==
In 1841 he bought an interest in the New York Mechanic, which he published and edited in New York. The first issue of this magazine was published on January 2, 1841, and was subtitled "the advocate of industry and enterprise, and journal of mechanical, and other scientific improvements". After 23 weekly issues Porter moved the magazine to Boston and renamed it American Mechanic, with the same sub-title. In this journal he published his plans for the rotary plow, hot air ventilation system, and advertised his general patent agency run in connection with the paper. The magazine survived through 106 issues, the last known one being on January 21, 1843.

In 1845 he started a new weekly, Scientific American, but 10 months later sold it to Orson Desaix Munn and Alfred Ely Beach.

== Airship ==
In 1849 Porter planned to build an 800-foot steam-powered airship with accommodations for 50 to 100 passengers, aiming to convey miners to the California Gold Rush. He had already built and flown several scale models in Boston and New York. He advertised New York-to-California service, asking a $50 down payment for a $200 fare, and began building immediately. His first "aeroport" was 240 feet long; it was destroyed by a tornado. Later that year, he began a 700-foot version with new backers, but during a showing of the almost-complete dirigible on Thanksgiving Day, rowdy visitors tore the hydrogen bag and destroyed it. In 1854 his third attempt ended with technical troubles.

== Personal life ==
Porter proclaimed his Christian faith, as for example in the first issue of Scientific American:

First, then, let us, as rational creatures, be ever ready to acknowledge God as our Creator and daily Preserver; and that we are each of us individually dependant on his special care and good will towards us, in supporting the wonderful action of nature which constitutes our existence; and in preserving us from the casualties, to which our complicated and delicate structure is liable.

== Death and legacy ==
Porter died on August 13, 1884, at the home of his son, Rufus Frank Porter (1859-?), in West Haven, Connecticut.

Porter's obituary in the Scientific American described his remarkable life and "abnormally busy career", which had seen 21 American presidents take office. The magazine pronounced "he has gone to the grave leaving a name 'writ in water,' we still think that in the world of invention his name will be fully blazoned as a material benefactor to his fellow men... We may add in conclusion that although he has not in any sense attained the fame and eminence of Morse, a Howe, or Edison, Rufus Porter will live as one of the best and brightest examples of the versatility of American invention."

== Writings ==
- 1825 A Select Collection of Valuable and Curious Arts, and Interesting Experiments
- 1849 Aerial Navigation: The Practicality of Traveling Pleasantly and Safely from New York to California in Three Days

== Murals by Porter ==
- Birchwood Inn, Temple, New Hampshire
- Daniel Carr House, North Haverhill, New Hampshire
- Benjamin Cleaves House, Bridgton, Maine (Rufus Porter Museum)
- Eaton House, Bradford, New Hampshire
- Hancock Inn, Hancock, New Hampshire
- Kent House, Lyme, New Hampshire
- Prescott Homestead, Jaffrey, New Hampshire
- Reed Homestead, Townsend, Massachusetts
- Walter Russell House, Ashburnham, Massachusetts; part of the Cambridge Grant Historic District
- Mural House, Greene, Maine
- Damon Tavern, North Reading, Massachusetts
- The Joseph and Mary Kimball House, [Georgetown, Massachusetts]
