= Moose Pond =

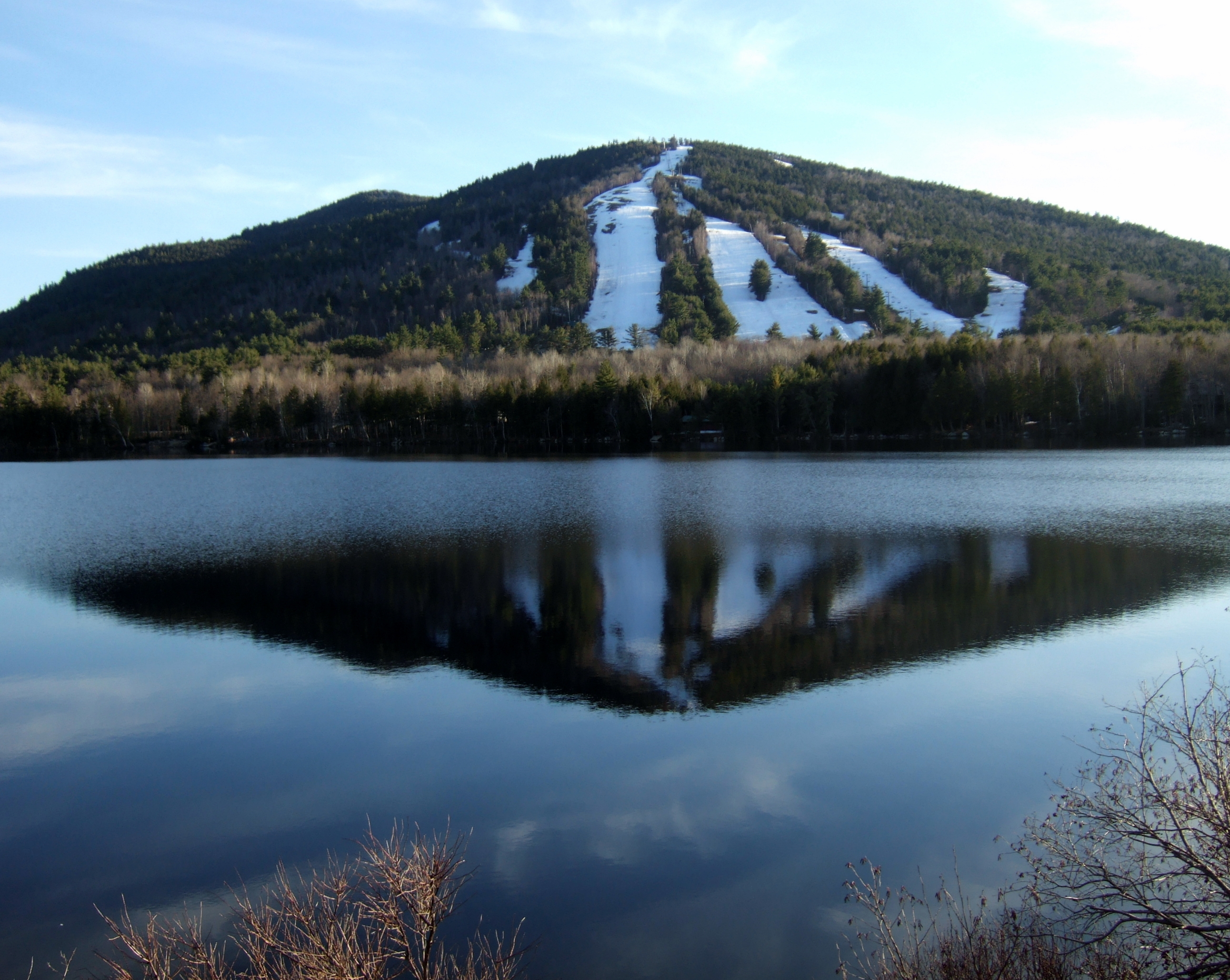
- Moose Pond, Spring 2009.

- Location within Maine Location within the United States
- Location: Cumberland County and Oxford County, Maine
- Coordinates: 43°58′18″N 70°48′31″W
- Type: lake
- Basin countries: United States
- Max. length: 8.7 mi (14 km)
- Surface area: 1,617 acres (6.54 km^{2})
- Average depth: 20 ft (6.1 m)
- Max. depth: 70 ft (21 m)
- Water volume: 30,722 acre⋅ft (37,895,000 m^{3})
- Surface elevation: 418 ft (127 m)

Moose Pond is located in the towns of Bridgton, Denmark and Sweden, in the state of Maine. Camp Winona, a camp for boys, Camp Wyonegonic, a camp for girls, and Pleasant Mountain Ski Area, a ski resort, are located on the pond.

== Statistics ==
- Total lake area - 1,617 acres (6.54 km^{2})
- Maximum recorded depth - 70 feet (21 m)
- Mean depth - 20 feet (6.1 m)
- Volume - 30,722 acre-feet (37,895,000 m^{3})
- Watershed - 11,170 acres (45.2 km^{2})
- Elevation - 418 feet (127 m)
- Shorefront lots - 497
- Approx 8.1 miles (13 km) long

== Fishing ==
The pond supports landlocked salmon and lake trout in the middle basin. The pond also supports populations of largemouth bass, has Maine's record 11 lb large mouth bass, smallmouth bass, yellow perch, white perch, chain pickerel, hornpout, rainbow smelt, white sucker, fallfish, golden shiners, pumpkinseed sunfish and slimy sculpin.
