= Moses Kent House =

Historic house in New Hampshire, United States

- U.S. National Register of Historic Places
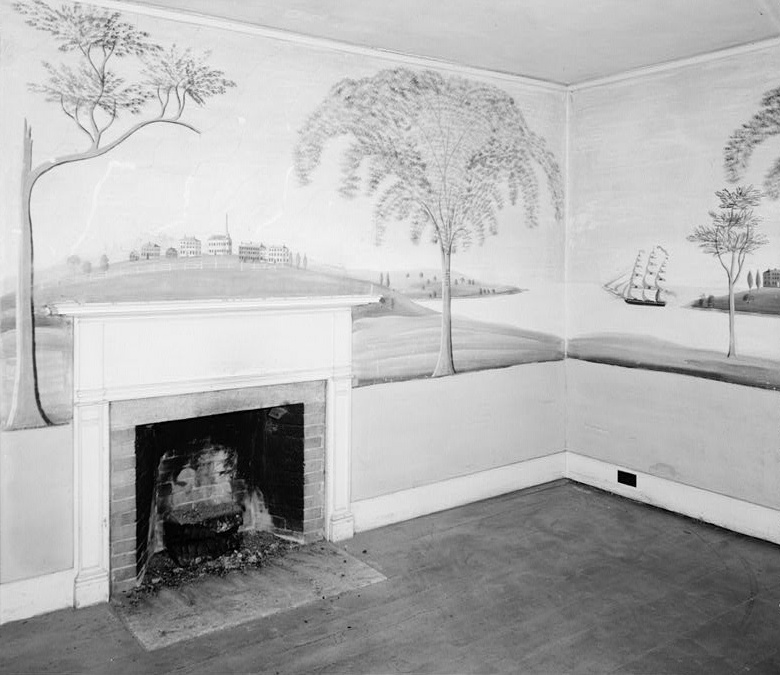
- Mural by Rufus Porter in the house, 1959 photograph

- Location within New Hampshire Location within the United States
- Location: River Rd., Lyme, New Hampshire
- Coordinates: 43°52′15″N 72°9′44″W
- Built: 1811
- Architectural style: Federal
- NRHP reference No.: 84002808
- Added to NRHP: June 7, 1984

The Moses Kent House is a historic house on River Road in Lyme, New Hampshire. Built in 1811, it is a good local example of Federal period architecture, most notable for the well-preserved murals on its interior walls, drawn by the itinerant artist Rufus Porter. The house was listed on the National Register of Historic Places in 1984.

== Description and history ==
The Moses Kent House stands in a rural setting just south of the Lyme-Orford border, on the east side of River Road north of Clay Brook. It is a 2 1/2-story wood-frame structure, with a gabled roof, two interior chimneys, and a clapboarded exterior. It is five bays wide and two deep, with a symmetrical front facade that has windows arranged symmetrically around the center entrance. The entrance has a fine Federal period surround, set in a shallow recess with flanking narrow pilasters and sidelight windows. The recess is itself framed by pilasters and topped by a half-round fan. The interior has a central hall plan, with two rooms on each side of the hall, which is divided into a front and rear section on the ground floor. The hall, left parlor, and second-floor left parlor chamber each have plaster walls on which murals have been drawn. The murals depict countryside scenes and views of harbors, classic thematic elements of the work of Rufus Porter.

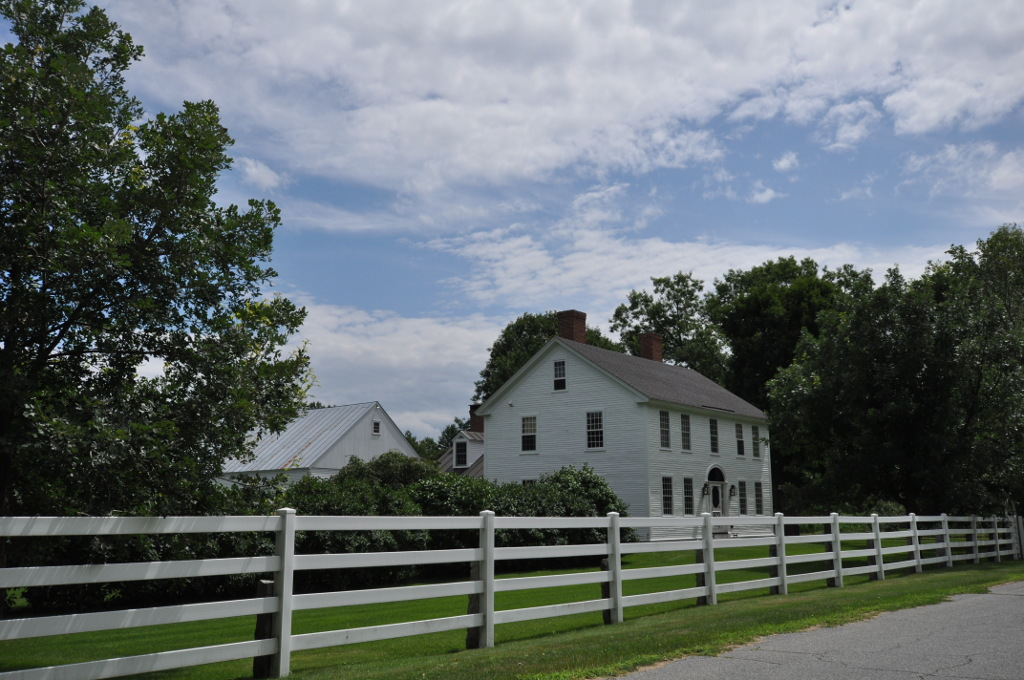

The house was built in 1811 by Moses Kent, and has been little altered structurally since its construction; the only major modification is the addition of a garage at the end of the ell in 1952. The house has seen a variety of residential uses, including as a rental property, summer vacation home, and farmhouse. The interior underwent a careful restoration in the 1980s by historic preservationists familiar with Porter's work, and is now protected under a historic preservation easement.

== See also ==
- National Register of Historic Places listings in Grafton County, New Hampshire
