= Stone House (Bridgton, Maine) =

Historic house in Maine, United States

- U.S. National Register of Historic Places
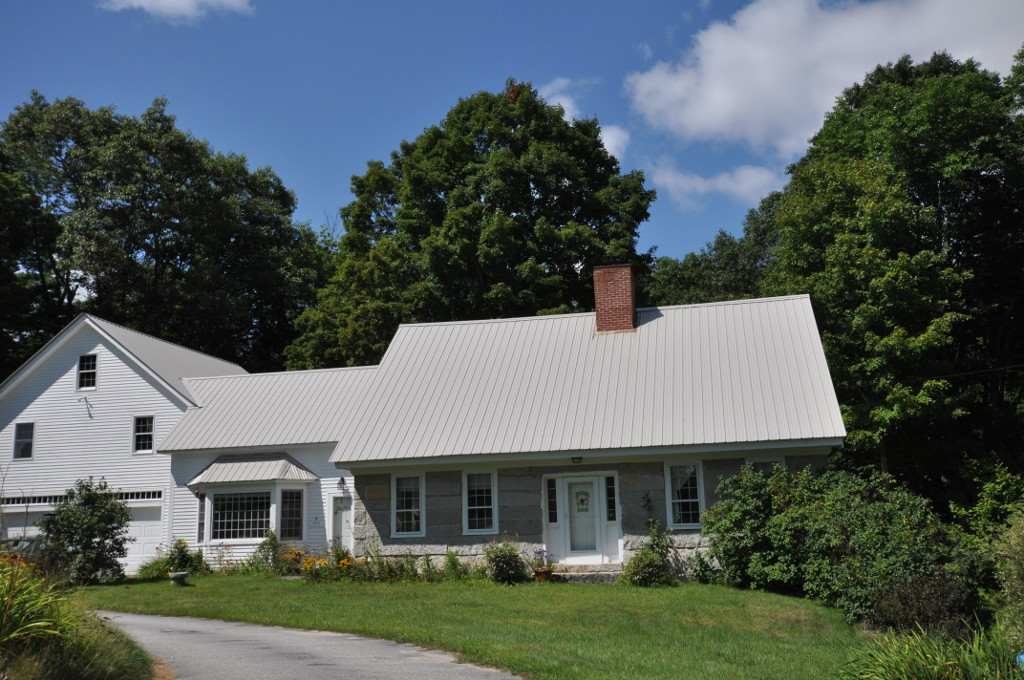

- Location within Maine Location within the United States
- Location: Burnham Road, Bridgton, Maine
- Coordinates: 44°00′02″N 70°40′38″W
- Built: 1830
- Architect: John Mead
- NRHP reference No.: 84001361
- Added to NRHP: July 19, 1984

The Stone House is an historic house located on Burnham Road in Bridgton, Maine, United States. Built 1828–1830, it is a rare example in Maine of a Cape style house built out of stone in the English masonry style. It was listed on the National Register of Historic Places in 1984.

== Description and history ==
The Stone House stands in a rural part of southern Bridgton, on the north side of Burnham Road, a short way west of its junction with Willis Park Road. The house is built on a sloping lot, and presents a single story to the south and two stories to the north. It is built out of slabs of granite hand-quarried from a local quarry, with a timber-frame half story. It has a gabled roof and a central brick chimney, and modern ells extend the building to the west. Its main facade is five bays wide, with a center entrance framed by sidelight windows.

The house was built in 1828-30 by John Mead, Sr., an Englishman who settled here in the early 1800s. In 1828, his house was destroyed by a freak windstorm, and he decided to build a house that was capable of withstanding such events. It is the only house known in western Maine that uses English masonry methods. Mead was also one of a small number of farmers in Maine who engaged in planting mulberry trees for the purpose of cultivating silk worms.

== See also ==
- National Register of Historic Places listings in Cumberland County, Maine
