= Four on the Fourth Road Race =

Bridgton's Four on the Fourth Road Race is an annual 4-mile (6.4 km) foot race run held each July 4 in Bridgton, Maine, United States. It began in 1976. It grew from 169 participants in its first year (1976) to approximately 2000 runners and walkers for the 2011 race. The first five years were directed by Phoebe and Jerry Levine of North Bridgton, while years six through 25 were directed by Loraine and Jay Spenciner of Bridgton. Since 2002, the race has been directed by the Four on the Fourth Board (local residents closely associated with the Bridgton Public Library). On November 14, 2010, the Maine Running Hall of Fame inducted the Bridgton 4 on the Fourth Road Race into the Maine Running Hall of Fame.

The race attracted 2028 runners in 2011 from more than 35 states and numerous foreign countries.

Most of the proceeds of the race go to the Bridgton Public Library and other local charities.

In 2020, the race donated $21,500 to the Bridgton Public Library from the virtual race.
