= Lt. Robert Andrews House =

Historic house in Maine, United States

- U.S. National Register of Historic Places
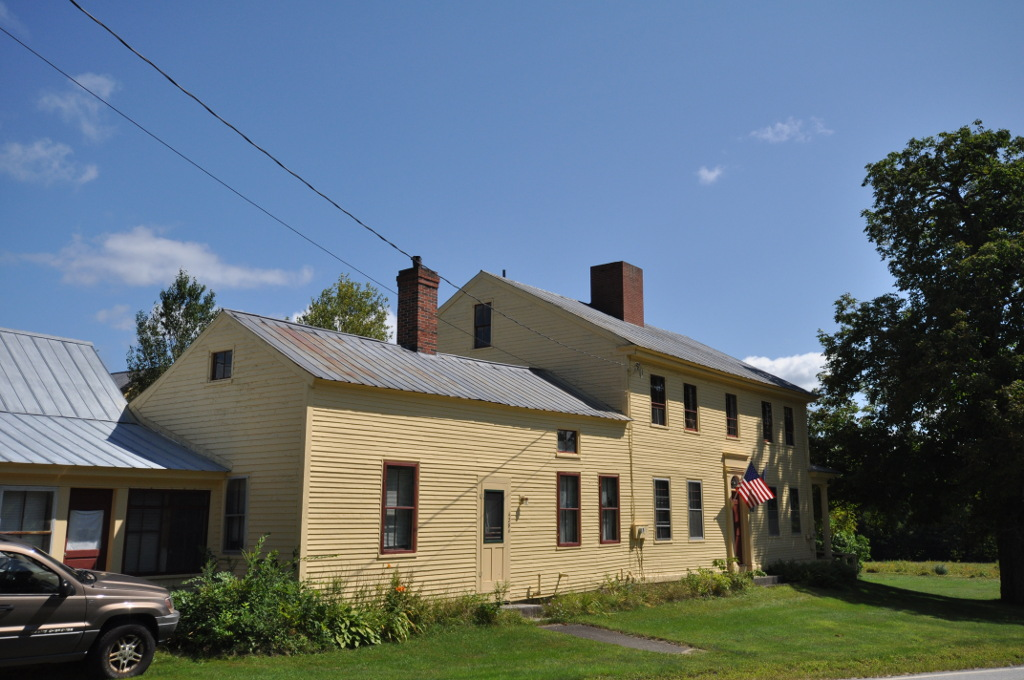

- Location within Maine
- Location: 428 South Bridgton Road, Bridgton, Maine
- Coordinates: 43°59′42″N 70°42′27″W
- Architectural style: Federal
- NRHP reference No.: 05001440
- Added to NRHP: December 21, 2005

The Lt. Robert Andrews House is an historic house at 428 South Bridgton Road in Bridgton, Maine, United States. Built in 1805 by John Kilborn, Jr., a local master builder, it was the home for many years of Robert Andrews, a veteran of the American Revolutionary War and an early settler of the Bridgton area. The house was listed on the National Register of Historic Places in 2005.

== Description and history ==
The Andrews House stands close to the east side of South Bridgton Road (Maine State Route 107) in a rural area of southern Bridgton. The house is a rambling connected series of wood-frame structures, with the main house block at the southern end, and ells extending along the road to the north and behind the house to the east. The main block is a 2 1/2-story structure, five bays wide, with a side gable roof, central chimney, clapboard siding, and a stone foundation. Decorative elements are minimal, with the central entrance framed by pilasters and a fanlight, with a dentillated cornice above. A shed-roof porch extends across the southern facade, supported by fluted Doric columns. A 1 1/2-story four-bay addition, its front flush with that of the main block, extends north, with another section extending further north to join the house to a carriage barn. On the east side a series of two ells join the house to a livestock barn.

Lieutenant Robert Andrews, a native of Boxford, Massachusetts, was one of several American Revolutionary War veterans from that town to receive grants of land from the state in 1780 in the area of what is now Bridgton. His first house location is not known, but he commissioned construction of this "mansion house" in 1805 from John Kilborn, Jr., another war veteran with a reputation for high-quality workmanship. Andrews was a major benefactor and civic actor in the town, serving as town selectman, and donating land and funds for churches and schools. A bachelor, he shared the house with younger relatives as he got older, building the four-bay ell on the north side as his living space. This arrangement ultimately led to the division of the house as a two-family after his death in 1845; the house was returned to single-family use in the 1990s. The extensive series of additions in two directions is a consequence of this division. One family Andrews shared the house with was with his niece and her husband, Sophia and Thomas Cleaves. Their son Henry, who later served as Governor of Maine, was born in this house in 1840.

== See also ==
- National Register of Historic Places listings in Cumberland County, Maine
