= Rufus Ingalls =

American military general (1818–1893)

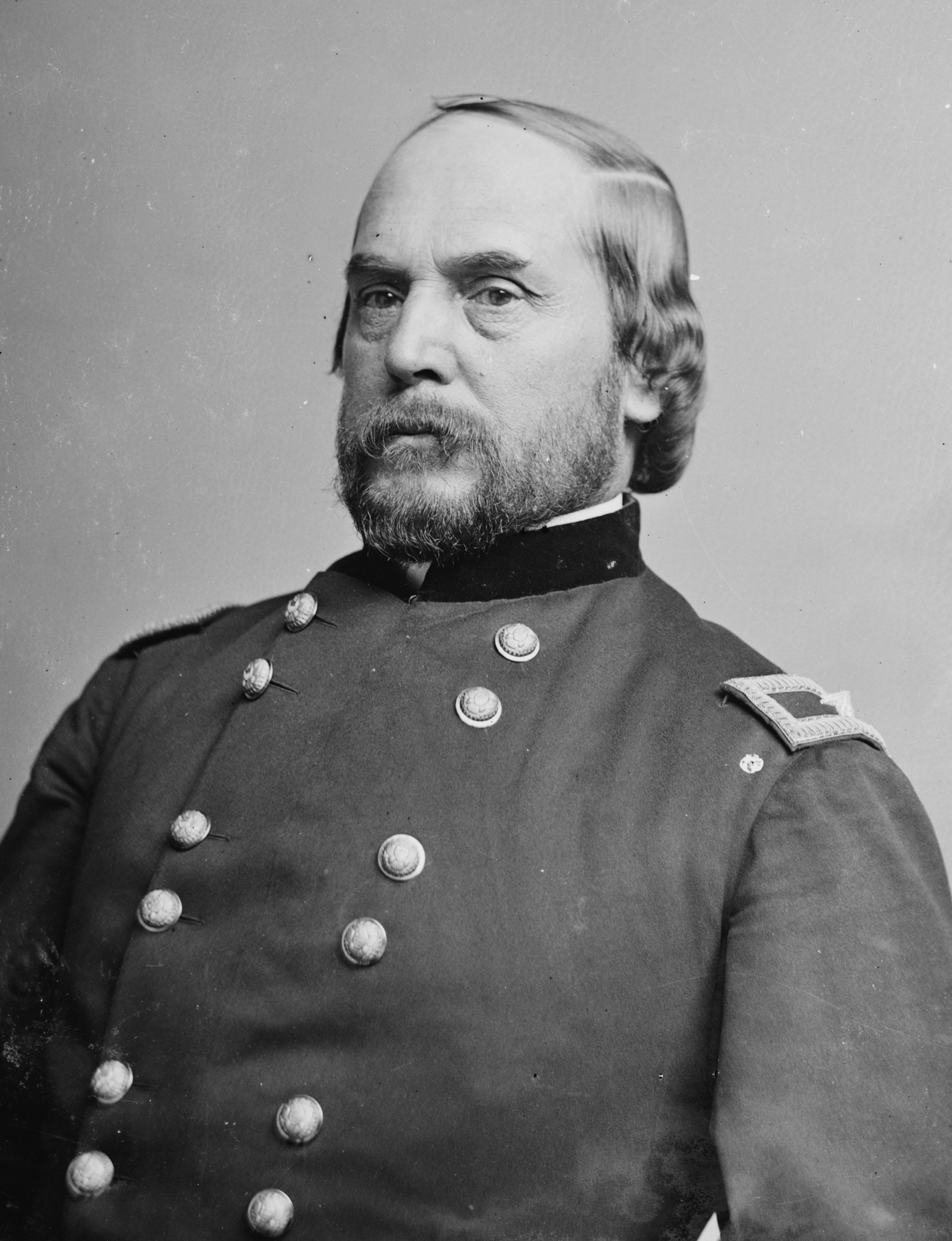
- Born: August 23, 1818; Denmark, Maine
- Died: January 15, 1893 (aged 74); New York City, New York
- Burial place: Arlington National Cemetery
- Military career
- Allegiance: United States of America; Union
- Branch: United States Army; Union Army
- Service years: 1843–1883
- Rank: Brigadier General; Brevet Major General
- Commands: Quartermaster General of the United States Army
- Conflicts: Mexican–American War; American Civil War

Rufus Ingalls (August 23, 1818 – January 15, 1893) was an American military general who served as the 16th Quartermaster General of the United States Army.

== Early life and career ==
Ingalls was born in the village of Denmark in what is now Maine (at the time, it was a part of Massachusetts). His father Cyrus was a prominent local mill owner and politician who was among those at the Maine constitutional convention in 1819. Through his father's political connections, Rufus Ingalls was appointed to the United States Military Academy, graduating in the Class of 1843, which included his friend Ulysses S. Grant. Ingalls was brevetted as a Second Lieutenant and assigned to garrison duty in the western frontier.

In 1845, he joined the First U.S. Dragoons with the rank of first lieutenant. Ingalls served in the Mexican–American War in the New Mexico Territory in the Army of the West under Col. Stephen W. Kearny. Ingalls distinguished himself in action at the skirmish at Eabudo and conflict at Pueblo de Taos, for which he received the brevet rank of first lieutenant. He later served in California under Kearny. He became a quartermaster in 1848 and served in that role the rest of his career.

Promoted to the rank of captain, he was assigned to duty in the Oregon Territory in 1849, and then to Fort Vancouver in 1852, along with Ulysses Grant. There, he joined the local Freemasons. In early 1854, while on duty in Washington DC, Ingalls was ordered to accompany the Steptoe Expedition from Fort Leavenworth in Kansas across the continent through the Utah Territory to the Pacific Coast.

== Civil War ==
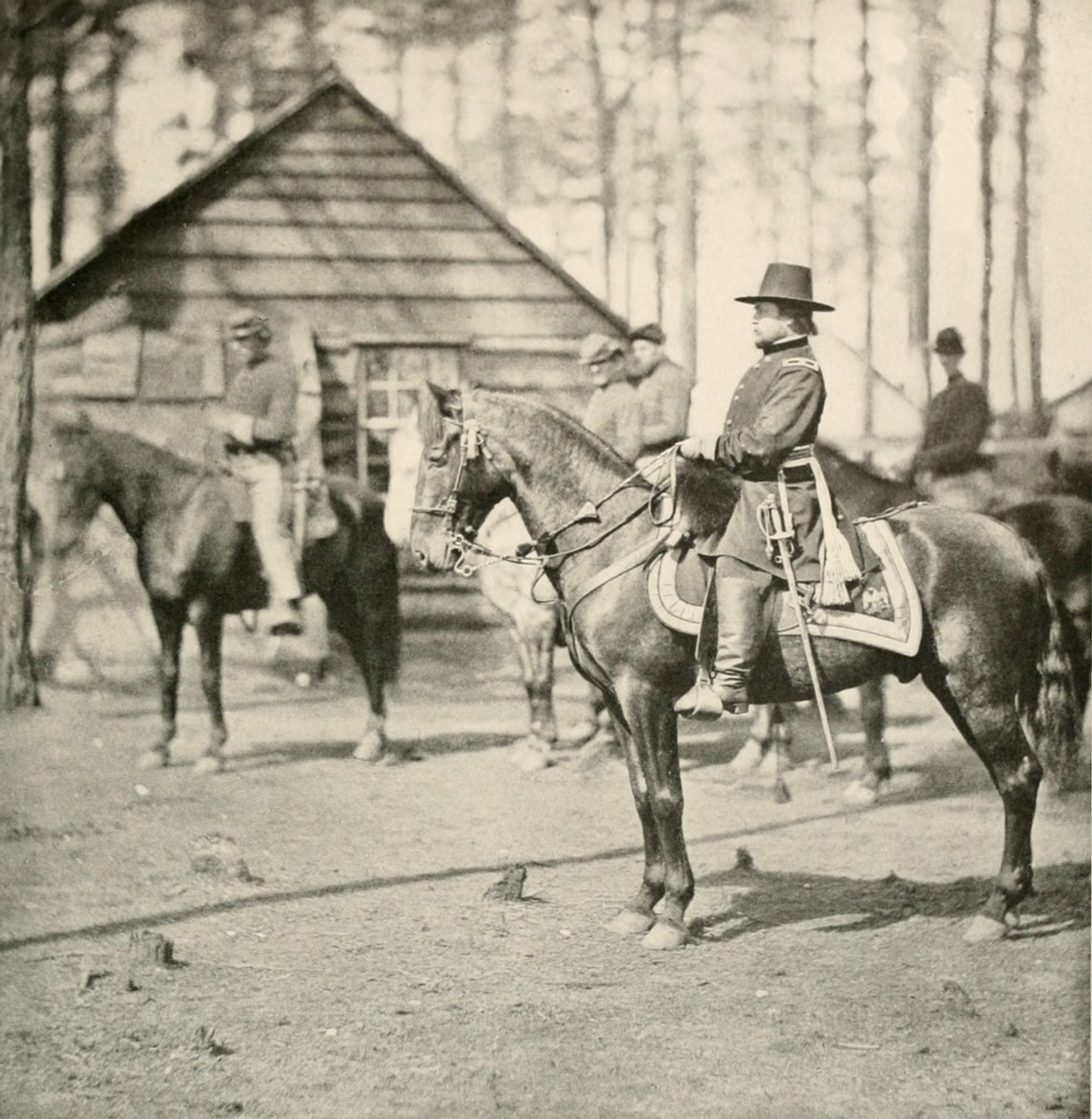
Union Major General Rufus Ingalls

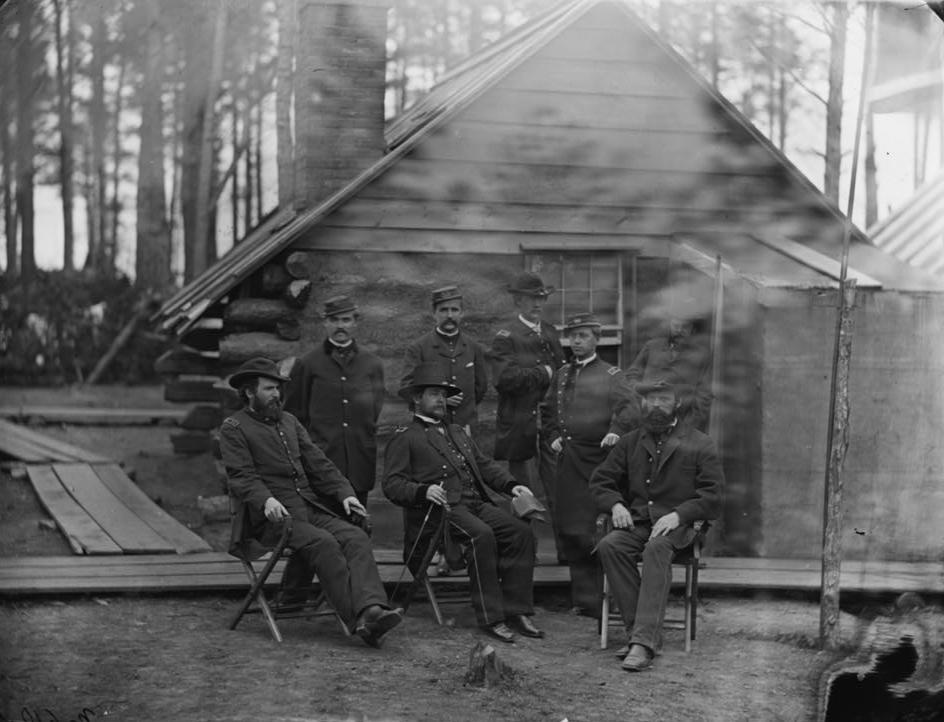
General Rufus Ingalls (seated, center) and other officers in Brandy Station, Virginia, April, 1864

With the outbreak of the Civil War in April 1861, Ingalls was reassigned to duty at Fort Pickens in Florida. He became a major and then a lieutenant colonel in the volunteer army. Shortly after the First Battle of Manassas in July, he moved northward to Virginia to serve as aide-de-camp to Maj. Gen. George B. McClellan. He was promoted to the rank of major in January 1862.

Ingalls helped establish effective supply depots at Yorktown, Eltham's Landing, Cumberland Landing, and White House Landing for McClellan's Army of the Potomac during the Peninsula Campaign. He skillfully evacuated White House Landing with all supplies, transportation and labor during the Seven Day's Battles. Consequently, he became the Chief Quartermaster of the Army of the Potomac in August 1862 following the Peninsula Campaign and performed his duties efficiently during the Northern Virginia and subsequent Maryland Campaigns, winning praise for his logistics skills.

In June 1864, his old friend Ulysses S. Grant placed Ingalls in charge of supply with responsibility for all Federal armies operating against Petersburg and Richmond. His logistics base at City Point, Virginia, became the largest port operation in the Western Hemisphere.

Ingalls was present at the surrender at Appomattox Court House.

Ingalls won brevets to the rank of major general in both the regular and volunteer services.

== Postbellum ==
With the surrender of Robert E. Lee in April 1865 and the subsequent mustering out of much of the Union Army, Ingalls left the City Point depot in May. He returned to Washington, and in July 1866 was given the rank of colonel in the Regular Army. He served in a variety of quartermaster posts for the next two decades in New York City, San Francisco, and Chicago. For sixteen years, he was the chief quartermaster of the Pacific and the Missouri Division.

On February 23, 1882, he was named as the 16th Quartermaster General of the U.S. Army, with the full rank of brigadier general, succeeding Daniel H. Rucker. He retired from the army in 1883 and entered civilian life in Oregon. Ingalls moved to New York City in 1891, where he died two years later at the age of 74. He was buried with military honors at Arlington National Cemetery.

== Honors ==
Ingalls Street in San Francisco is named for him. Rufus Ingalls was inducted into the Quartermaster Hall of Fame in 1987.

== See also ==
- List of American Civil War generals (Union)
- List of American Civil War battles
- Bibliography of Ulysses S. Grant
- Bibliography of the American Civil War
