= William F. Perry House =

Historic house in Maine, United States

- U.S. National Register of Historic Places
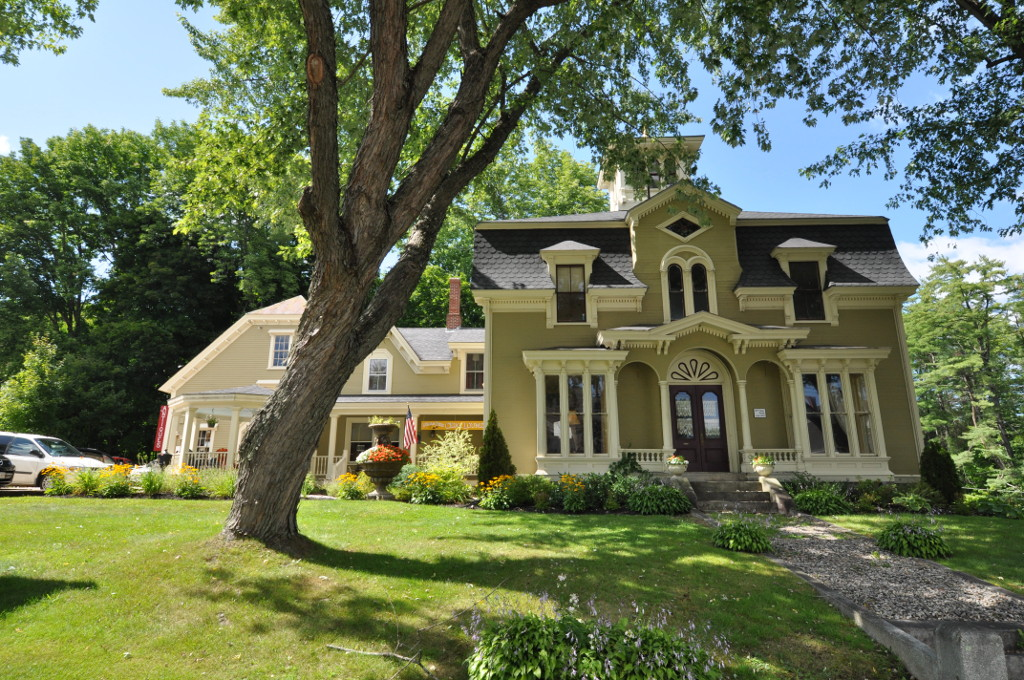

- Location within Maine Location within the United States
- Location: 32 Main St., Bridgton, Maine
- Coordinates: 44°03′17″N 70°42′52″W
- Area: 1 acre (0.40 ha)
- Built: 1870
- Architectural style: Italianate, Second Empire
- NRHP reference No.: 75000098
- Added to NRHP: September 25, 1975

The William Fenderson Perry House is an historic house at 32 Main Street in Bridgton, Maine, United States. Built in 1870 and extensively remodeled in 1874, it is a fine example of transitional Italianate-Second Empire architecture, and was owned for many years by Bridgton's most prominent businessman, mill owner William F. Perry. It was listed on the National Register of Historic Places in 1975.

== Description and history ==
The Perry House stands on a hill overlooking the village of Bridgton, on the north side of Main Street (United States Route 302), at its junction with Highland Road. It is basically a high-style interpretation of the 19th-century connected New England farmstead, with its main block connected to a carriage barn via a series of ells. The main house has elaborate style, with projecting window bays flanking its front entrance, with an engaged porch with mini-gabled roof between. The mansard roof is topped by a cupola, and there are hip roof dormers flush with the front facade. Cornices over the window bays and on the roof are bracketed. The elegant Victorian detailing is continued through the ell and to the carriage barn.

The house was built in 1870 for William Cross, a local cattle merchant, and was purchased in 1874 by William F. Perry. The house's styling is probably the result of alterations made by Perry, who was by then already owner of Bridgton's largest textile mills. Perry's fortune was due in part to his marriage in 1859 to Anna Maria Gibbs, daughter of the town's biggest mill owner of that period. Perry rapidly expanded the area's mill capacity, and was able to win lucrative contracts to supply textiles to the Union Army during the American Civil War. Perry also invented a more efficient turbine, which was manufactured in Bridgton and installed in mills across Maine. The house is now the Clipper Merchant Tea House that opened in July, 2016.

== See also ==
- National Register of Historic Places listings in Cumberland County, Maine
