= South Bridgton Congregational Church =

Historic church in Maine, United States

- U.S. National Register of Historic Places
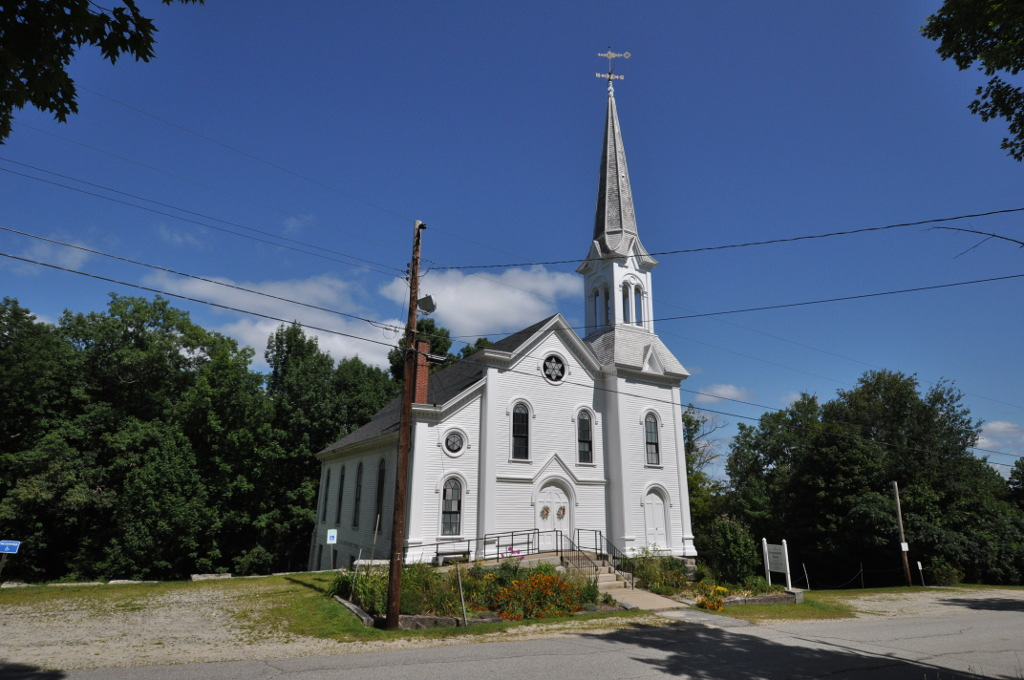

- Location within Maine Location within the United States
- Location: Fosterville Rd., South Bridgton, Maine
- Coordinates: 43°59′19″N 70°42′23″W
- Area: 1 acre (0.40 ha)
- Built: 1870
- Architect: Francis H. Fassett
- Architectural style: Italianate, Gothic Revival
- NRHP reference No.: 87000947
- Added to NRHP: June 25, 1987

South Bridgton Congregational Church is a historic church on Fosterville Road in South Bridgton, Maine. Built in 1870 to a design by Francis H. Fassett, it is a remarkably sophisticated example of Italianate and Gothic Revival architecture for a comparatively rural setting. It was listed on the National Register of Historic Places in 1987.

== Description and history ==
The South Bridgton Congregational Church stands on the east side of Fosterville Road, south of its junction with Maine State Route 107. Oriented facing the street, it is a single-story wood frame structure, with a basement level that is nearly fully exposed due to the sloping terrain. The building is covered by a gabled roof and sheathed in wooden clapboards, and rests on a granite foundation. The main facade has a stepped appearance, with three sections. At the right is the tower, which rises two stages to a skirt roof, above which is an open belfry with an octagonal spire. Both the skirt roof and the spire have small gabled sections. The central section is stepped back from the tower, with both having entrances on the ground floor set in round-arch frames with molded hoods. The left section is stepped further back, and has a round-arch window (similar to those found elsewhere on the building, with a round window above. The building corners are pilastered, and the projecting eave has banded modillions. The interior is richly decorated, and is little altered from the building's construction. The principal alterations have been the provision of electricity for lighting, and the installation of an organ behind the altar in 1892.

The church was built in 1870-71, and was the second for the congregation, replacing a now-demolished structure that stood across the street. It was designed by Portland architect Francis H. Fassett, one of Maine's leading architects of the mid-to-late 19th century. It is similar in design to two other Fassett churches, in Falmouth and Cherryfield, both of which no longer stand.

== See also ==
- National Register of Historic Places listings in Cumberland County, Maine
