= Nancy Masterton =

American politician

Nancy Nye Masterton (November 30, 1930 – May 17, 2015) was an American farmer, volunteer and politician.

Born in Watertown, Massachusetts, Masterton moved with her husband to Cape Elizabeth, Maine. Masterton volunteered with several groups and had a farm in Denmark, Maine. From 1977 to 1985, Masterton served in the Maine House of Representatives and was a Republican. Masterton died in Cape Elizabeth, Maine.
