= Daniel Carr House =

Historic house in New Hampshire, United States

- U.S. National Register of Historic Places
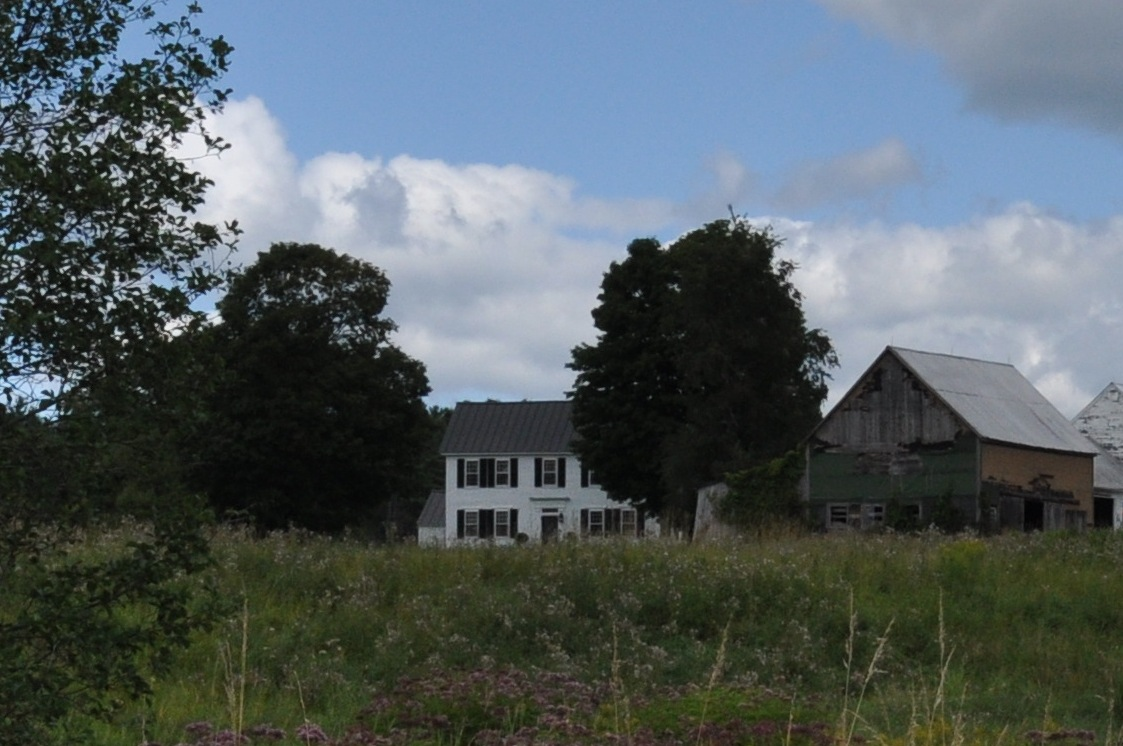

- Location within New Hampshire Location within the United States
- Location: Brier Hill Rd. N side, 1.5 miles (2.4 km) from jct. with NH 10, Haverhill, New Hampshire
- Coordinates: 44°06′34.6″N 72°00′16.1″W
- Area: 2 acres (0.81 ha)
- Built: 1825
- Built by: Carr, John; Porter, Rufus
- Architectural style: Federal
- NRHP reference No.: 92000156
- Added to NRHP: March 27, 1992

The Daniel Carr House is a historic house on Brier Hill Road in Haverhill, New Hampshire. Built about 1796, the house is most notable for the high quality folk murals drawn on its walls, most likely by the itinerant artist Rufus Porter between 1825 and 1830. The house was listed on the National Register of Historic Places in 1992.

== Description and history ==
The Daniel Carr House is located in a rural setting in northern Haverhill, on a dirt lane extending west from a 90-degree bend in Brier Hill Road about 1.5 miles (2.4 km) northeast of New Hampshire Route 10. The house is a connected farmstead, with a 2 1/2-story main house, from which a series of ells extend northward and then east to a barn. The main block is five bays wide, with a center entrance flanked by pilasters and topped by a transom window and corniced entablature. The first ell, also two stories, is probably older. The interior follows a center hall plan, with parlors on either side of the center hall, where a staircase rises to the second floor. The western parlor, as well as both levels of the hall, feature painted and stenciled artwork on their walls, above wooden wainscoting and chair rails. The parlor is painted in multiple colors, with scenes that include the Portland Observatory and a cluster of houses on an island. The panels in the hall and stair wall are monochrome and less elaborate. The border stencilwork in these rooms is a careful reproduction of the original stencilwork, which has deteriorated and is now encapsulated under a layer of skim coat plaster.

The main block of the house was built c. 1825–30, probably by John Carr, and was attached to an earlier 1 1/2-story structure built by Daniel Carr c. 1796, which was rebuilt in the 1980s. The murals drawn on its walls are most likely by the itinerant artist Rufus Porter, and were probably drawn between 1825 and 1830, when Porter is known to have been working in this region. After standing vacant for two decades, the house was purchased by sisters Rebecca Field Jones and Alma Duckworth in the 1980s, and underwent a major historically accurate and sympathetic restoration effort. The sisters sought to restore the home’s original parcel of land as well, gradually acquiring 260 acres of woods and fields. They hoped their home, which they called Brierfields, would stand for many more centuries. They protected the building with a preservation easement held by Historic New England and donated a conservation easement to Upper Valley Land Trust (UVLT) to keep the land intact and undeveloped. As of 2014 the home is in Carr family hands.

== See also ==
- National Register of Historic Places listings in Grafton County, New Hampshire
