= Richard Dunn (politician) =

American politician

Richard L. Dunn (November 13, 1905 – October 20, 1988) was an American politician from Maine. Dunn, a Republican from Denmark, Maine, served 5 terms (10 years) in the Maine Legislature, including 3 terms (1962–1968) in the Maine House of Representatives and 2 terms (1968–1972) in the Maine Senate.

During his first term in the Senate, Dunn was appointed by the Senate President to the Agriculture and the Appropriations and Financial Affairs Committees.

In his second and final term, Dunn was appointed to the Appropriations and Financial Affairs Committee once more.
