= Rufus Porter Museum =

Museum in Bridgton, Maine, US

Coordinates: 44°03′24″N 70°43′10″W

Rufus Porter Museum of Art and Ingenuity
- Established: 2005
- Location: 121 Main Street; Bridgton, Maine
- Director: Karla Leandri Rider
- Website: www.rufusportermuseum.org

The Rufus Porter Museum of Art and Ingenuity is located in Bridgton, Maine. It is dedicated to the life and works of Rufus Porter (1792–1884). The museum is located on Main Street in two historic buildings and is open seasonally or by appointment.
