= Wales and Hamblen Store =

- U.S. National Register of Historic Places
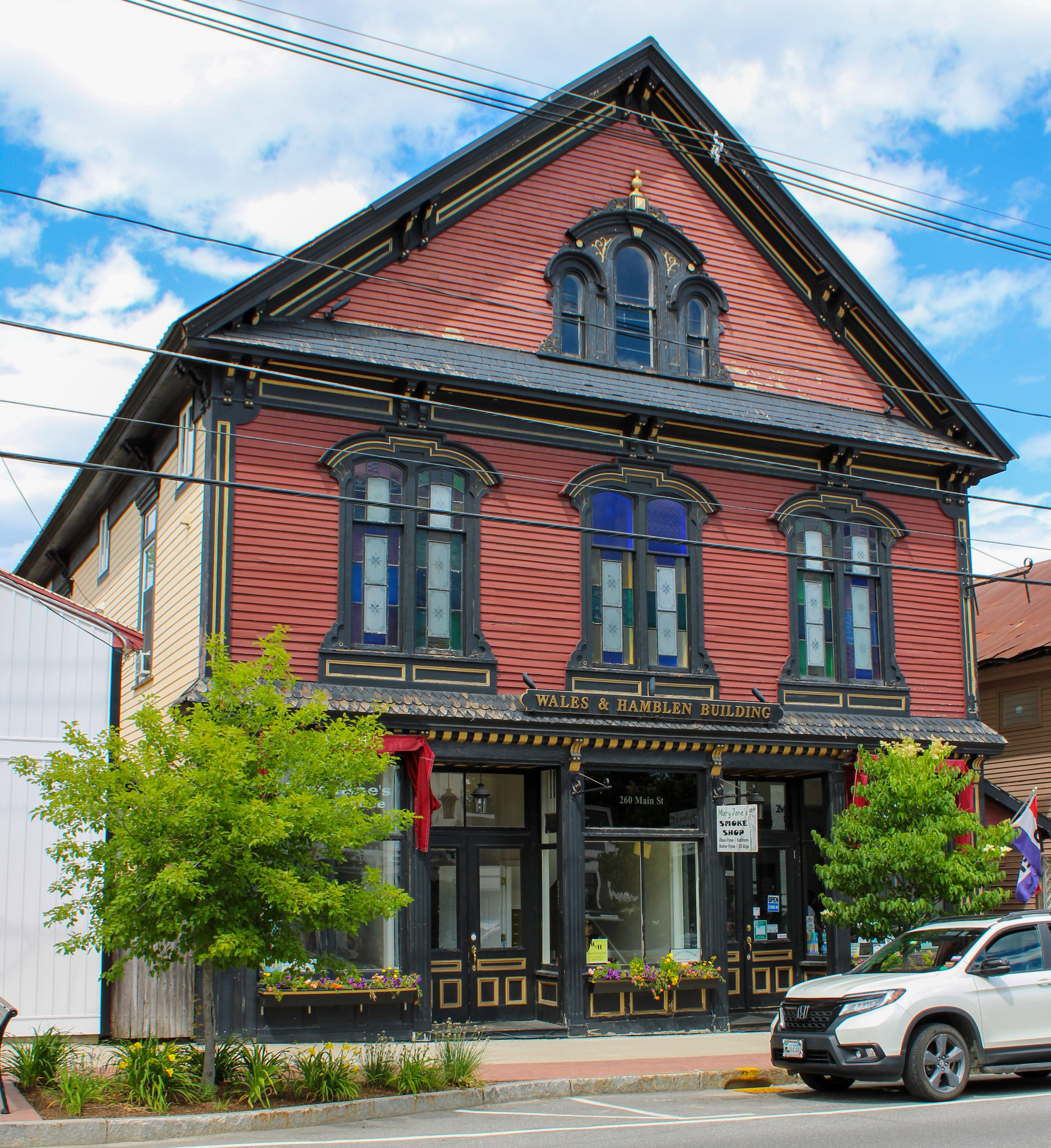

- Location within Maine
- Location: 260 Main St., Bridgton, Maine
- Coordinates: 44.0542°N 70.7030°W
- Built: 1882
- Architectural style: Italianate
- NRHP reference No.: 90000924
- Added to NRHP: June 14, 1990

The Wales and Hamblen Building is a historic commercial building at 260 Main Street in Bridgton, Maine. Built in 1882, it is a fine example of late Italianate architecture, and one of the town's most architecturally sophisticated commercial buildings. It was listed on the National Register of Historic Places.

== Description and history ==
The Wales and Hamblen Building stands on the north side of Main Street (United States Route 302) in the village center of Bridgton, between Depot Street and Portland Road. It is a 2 1/2-story wood-frame structure, with a gabled roof and clapboard siding. The front-facing gable is a fully pent gable with a paneled and bracketed cornice, styles repeated on the eave below the gable. The front facade corners are pilastered. The first floor has five bays, with three display windows flanking building and store entrances, and a narrow band of roofing on which is mounted a sign reading "Wales & Hamblen Building". The second floor has three pairs of narrow sash windows, set in segmented-arch openings with moulded surrounds above and panels below. There is an elaborate three-part round-arched window in the gable.

The building was constructed in 1882, after a fire destroyed the previous building on the site. It housed the hardware store of Fowler and Wales, which later became Wales and Hamblen. The upper floor houses a meeting hall space that was originally used by the local chapter of the International Order of Odd Fellows, which was discontinued in 1962. A rear ell was used for a number of years as a tin shop. In the late 1980s the building facade underwent a careful restoration.

== See also ==
- National Register of Historic Places listings in Cumberland County, Maine
