= Benjamin Cleaves House =

Historic house in Maine, United States

- U.S. National Register of Historic Places
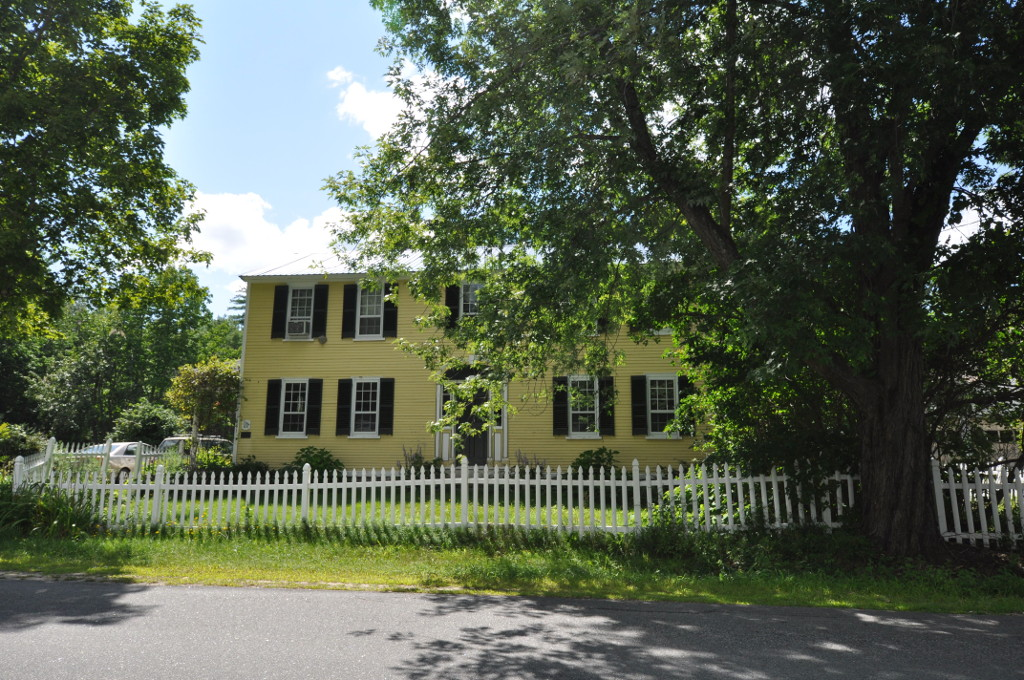

- Location within Maine Location within the United States
- Location: S. High St., Bridgton, Maine
- Coordinates: 44°2′23″N 70°42′39″W
- Built: 1828
- Architect: Rufus Porter
- Architectural style: Federal
- NRHP reference No.: 88000390
- Added to NRHP: April 20, 1988

The Benjamin Cleaves House is a historic house on South High Street in Bridgton, Maine, United States. Built in 1828, it is a well-preserved late example of Federal period architecture, and is most notable for the murals drawn on its walls, probably by the itinerant artist Rufus Porter. The house was listed on the National Register of Historic Places in 1988.

== Description and history ==
The Cleaves House is located on the west side of South High Street, between Bridgton Hospital and Tuttle Lane. It is a 2 1/2-story wood-frame structure, five bays wide, with a side-gable roof, two interior chimneys, clapboard siding, and granite foundation. Its main facade is symmetrical, with a center entrance flanked by sidelight windows and topped by a segmental louvered fan. A hip-roofed porch extends across the southern facade, and a telescoping series of ells extend from the rear of the main block to join it to a large barn. The house interior has a narrow central hall with winding staircase, and parlor rooms in front to either side. Both the hall and the northeast parlor walls have painted murals, depicting country and coastal scenes.

The house is believed to have been built about 1828 for Benjamin Cleaves, a local tinsmith. It is a well-preserved late example of Federal period architecture, a form of which Bridgton only has a few examples. The murals on its walls are attributed to Rufus Porter, and are believed to have been painted between 1830 and 1835. The subject material and form of the murals is stylistically with guidelines published by Porter in his 1825 publication Curious Arts, and uses a more bold color palette than his earlier work.

== See also ==
- National Register of Historic Places listings in Cumberland County, Maine
