= Birchwood Inn =

- U.S. National Register of Historic Places
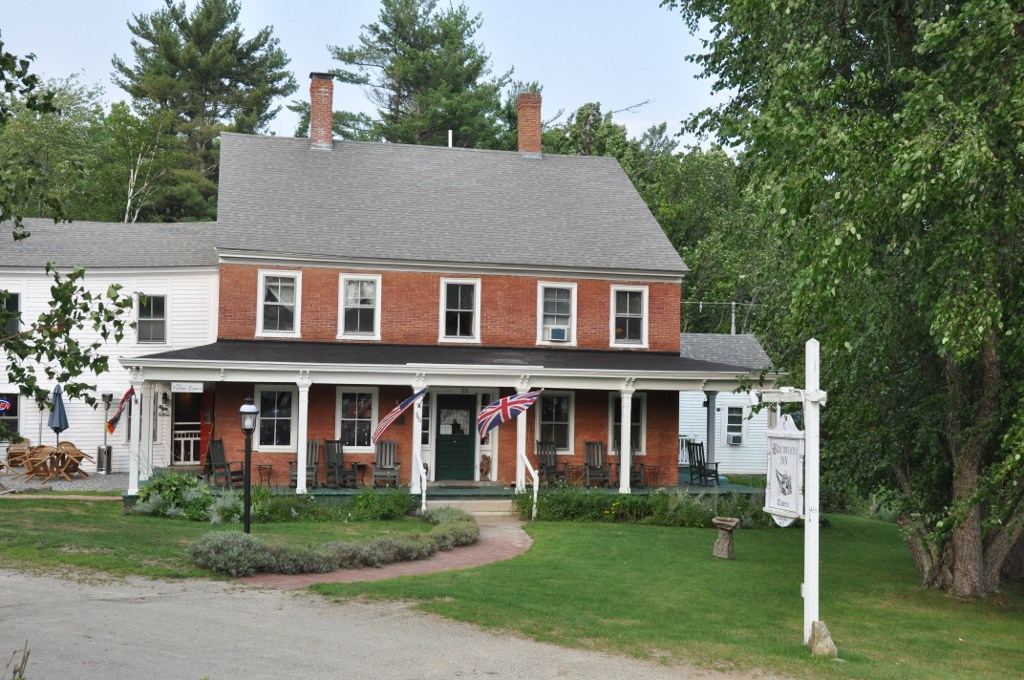

- Location within New Hampshire Location within the United States
- Location: 340 NH 45, Temple, New Hampshire
- Coordinates: 42°49′12″N 71°51′4″W
- Area: 2 acres (0.81 ha)
- Built: 1892
- NRHP reference No.: 85001194
- Added to NRHP: June 6, 1985

The Birchwood Inn is a historic tavern and inn on New Hampshire Route 45 in the center of Temple, New Hampshire. With a construction history dating to the early 19th century, it is an architecturally important example of how traveler accommodations changed in rural New Hampshire in the 19th century. The inn has been identified as "The Birchwood" since 1892, and was the town's only public accommodation for most of the 19th century. The building, still in use as a restaurant and inn, was listed on the National Register of Historic Places in 1985. In 1981 the inn and surrounding area were used in the filming of the movie Summer, based on an Edith Wharton novel.

== Description and history ==
The Birchwood Inn is located in Temple's central village, on the east side of NH 45, at its junction with General Miller Highway. Its main building is a 2½ story, roughly rectangular, brick and wood-frame structure. The front half of the building, its five-bay width and about half of each side wall, are faced in brick, while the rear of the block is framed in wood and sheathed in clapboards. A single-story porch extends across the front and wraps around the sides, supported by chamfered square columns. Walls on some of its interior spaces were painted by muralist Rufus Porter, and it retains a well-preserved period taproom. This block is connected by an ell to a barn-like structure (built c. 1847–48), which was used for stabling horses on the ground level and has a large open hall above.

The early construction history of the building is not known. Based on its style, the inn was built during the Federal period (roughly 1790–1830), and has served as a center of hospitality ever since. The building has historically been used for town meetings and other civic and social events, serving as the town post office and general store. The expansion in 1847-48 made it possible to expand the establishment's entertainment offerings, with a sprung wooden floor in the second-floor ballroom. The front porch was added in 1892, when it was purchased by new owners and converted into a boarding house catering to tourists. Its amenities were further updated in the 1930s to include inside plumbing and electricity.

Extensive restoration of the entire building was done throughout January and February 2020. The renovations were focused on maintaining the historic atmosphere of the structure, with materials being purchased exclusively from local sources. Within the tavern, the high tables and bar top are constructed from a cherry tree that fell during the 2008 ice storm in the local town of Sharon.

The Birchwood Inn began hosting live music performances in April 2020. The performances were performed outdoors in front of the tavern, where residents could stop and enjoy. The musicians were also streamed live to the Birchwood Inn's social media page, during the COVID-19 Pandemic. Since then, due to licensing laws, they no longer offer copyrighted music, but do have local musicians who play for beer, food and tips and specialize in "Old Time" and original music.

== See also ==
- National Register of Historic Places listings in Hillsborough County, New Hampshire
