= Ralph Sarty =

American politician

Ralph W. Sarty, Jr. is an American politician from Maine. Sarty, a Republican from Denmark, Maine, served from 2007 to 2012 in the Maine House of Representatives. Sarty won a special election in November 2007 to replace Republican Phil Cressey, who had resigned earlier in 2007. He won election in his own right in 2008 and re-election 2010. He did not seek re-election 2012 and was replaced by fellow Republican Jonathan Kinney.

In an October 2008 profile, Sarty said that he supported cuts to spending and opposed raising taxes. He supported incentives for private businesses, including expanding the Pine Tree Development Zone program, which cut taxes for companies moving into certain areas of the Maine.

In 2011, Sarty was cited as one of 23 state legislators that received both a state-funded pension and a salary as a Representative.
