= Bridgton, Maine =

Town in Maine, United States

- Town
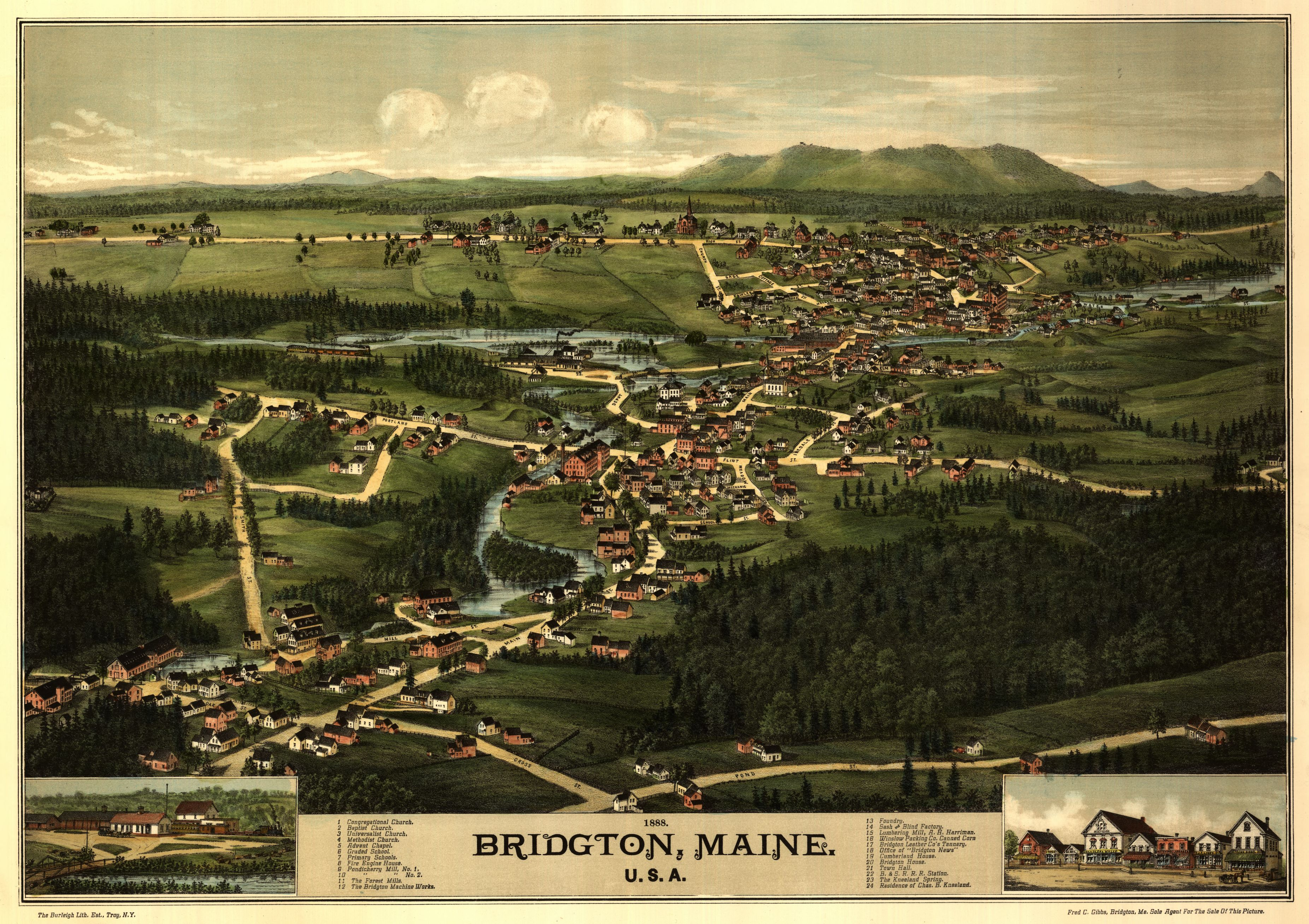
- Bird's eye view of 1888 Bridgton

- Location in Cumberland County and the state of Maine
- Coordinates: 44°02′53″N 70°44′16″W
- Country: United States
- State: Maine
- County: Cumberland
- Incorporated: 1794
- Villages: Bridgton; North Bridgton; South Bridgton; West Bridgton; Sandy Creek

Area
  - Total: 64.24 sq mi (166.38 km^{2})
  - Land: 56.79 sq mi (147.09 km^{2})
  - Water: 7.45 sq mi (19.30 km^{2})
- Elevation: 476 ft (145 m)

Population (2020)
  - Total: 5,418
  - Density: 95/sq mi (36.8/km^{2})
- Demonym: Bridgtonian
- Time zone: UTC-5 (Eastern (EST))
  - Summer (DST): UTC-4 (EDT)
- ZIP Codes: 04009 (Bridgton); 04057 (North Bridgton)
- Area code: 207
- GNIS feature ID: 582368
- Website: www.bridgtonmaine.org

Bridgton is a town in Cumberland County, Maine, United States. The population was 5,418 at the 2020 census. A resort area in Maine's Lakes Region, Bridgton is home to Bridgton Academy, a private preparatory school, and the Four on the Fourth Road Race.

Bridgton is part of the Portland-South Portland-Biddeford metropolitan area.

== History ==
The undeveloped land was first called Pondicherry. It was granted in 1768 by the Massachusetts General Court to Moody Bridges and a group of proprietors. Settlement began in 1770 at what is now North Bridgton, where a tavern was built. The community was organized in 1779 as Bridgetown Plantation, named after Moody Bridges, and then incorporated on February 7, 1794, as Bridgton.

Stevens Brook is only a mile and a half long, but it provided water power for 12 mill sites. It developed as an industrial center, with sawmills, gristmills, woolen textile mills, a tannery, shoe factory and brick manufacturer. Later, a corn and vegetable packing plant was built, in addition to a foundry, machine shop, shovel handle factory, sash and blind factory, and a coffin shop. Population increased when goods manufactured by water power could be transported to outside markets on the Cumberland and Oxford Canal, which opened to Portland in 1832. By the mid-19th century, the town contained about 3,000 inhabitants. When the Portland and Ogdensburg Railway bypassed Bridgton, the town built the 2-foot-gauge (610 mm) Bridgton and Saco River Railroad link to the national rail network in 1883. Summer vacationers arrived by rail and steamboat until automobile tourists began arriving after designation of the Theodore Roosevelt International Highway in 1919 (identified as U.S. Route 302 since 1935). The convenience of highway travel caused abandonment of the canal steamboats in 1932 and the narrow-gauge railroad in 1941. Bridgton remains a popular resort area, with many children's summer camps located along the shores of the beautiful lakes and Pleasant Mountain Ski Area (formerly Shawnee Peak), a ski resort, located in the western part of town.

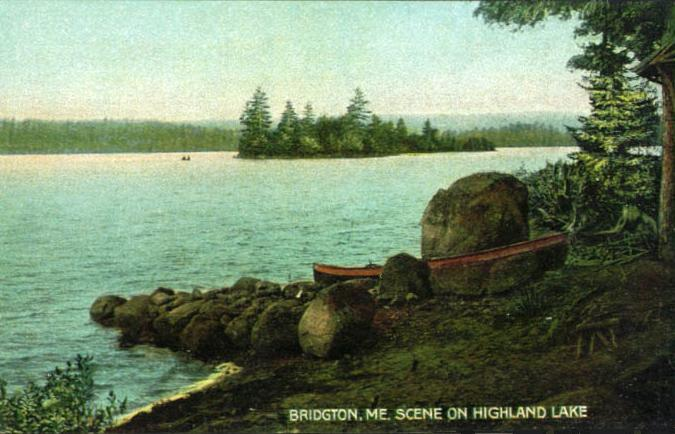
Highland Lake in 1908

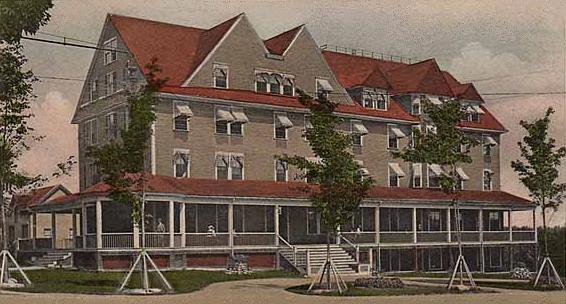
Bridgton House in 1906

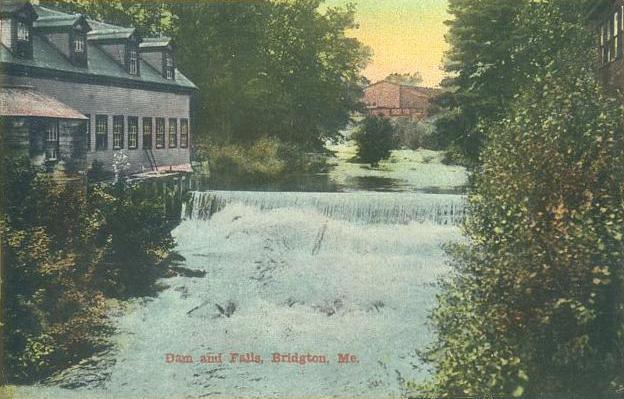
Dam and falls c. 1910

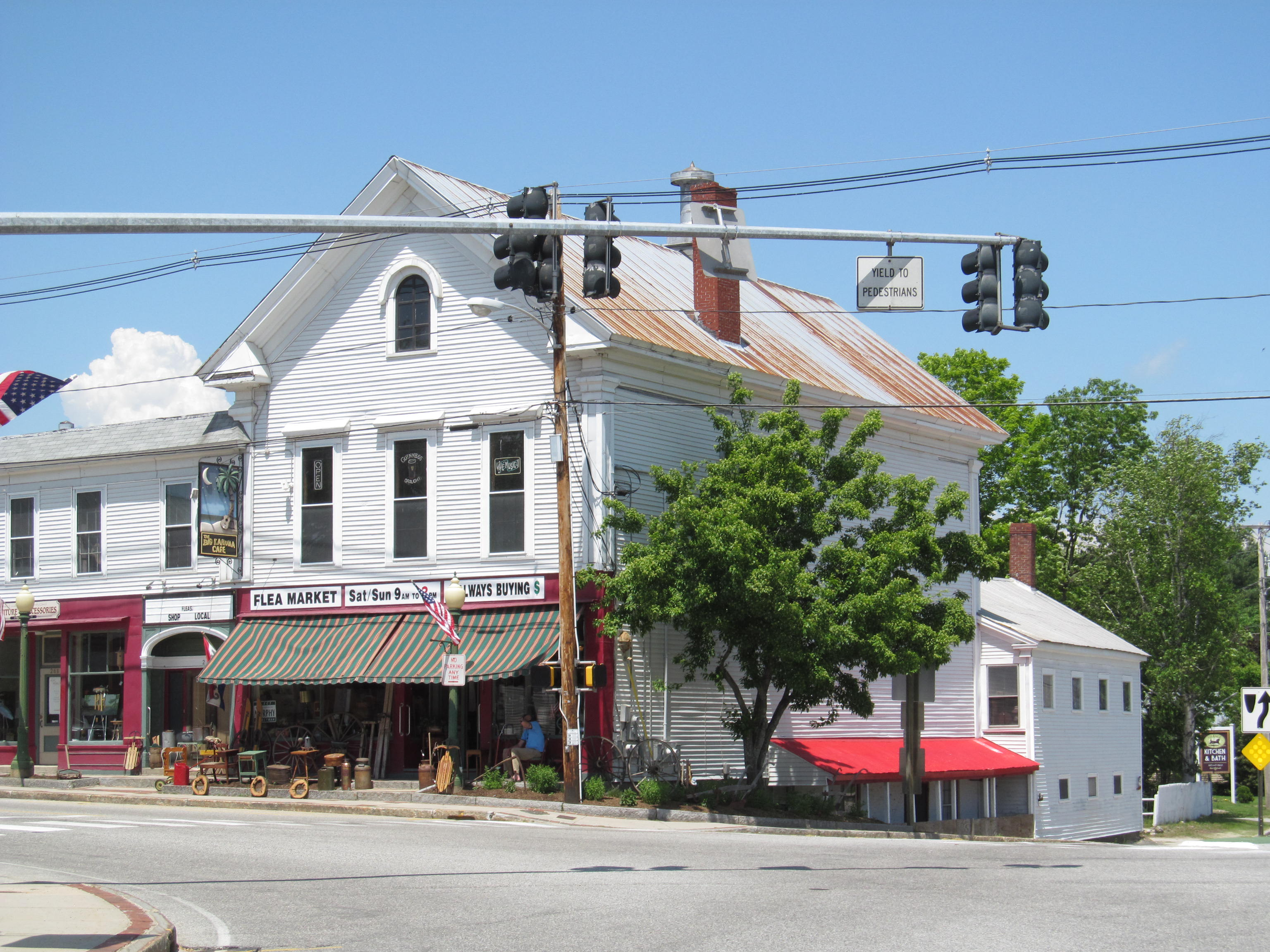
Bridgton in 2013

== Villages and neighborhoods ==
Bridgton has several villages and areas that can be classified as neighborhoods. They are:

- Bridgton is the main, central area of town. It begins on Route 302, near Meadow Road, and continues up towards Main Street, passing Highland Lake and the Soldiers' Monument, a Civil War monument at the top of Main Hill. This is the central downtown of Bridgton, featuring shops, offices and a movie theater. Also located in this area is Stevens Brook Elementary School, Bridgton Memorial School, the Bridgton Community Center, and Pondicherry Park. It is bordered to the west by South High Street. Pondicherry Park is a 62+ acre tract of land that includes forest, wetlands pastures and brooks. Hiking trails throughout allow visitors to step from downtown Bridgton into quiet woodlands in an instant. Dogs are not allowed in the entire park, but a dog trail is opening in summer 2012.
- North Bridgton is located just south of the towns of Waterford and Harrison. The main focal point here is Bridgton Academy. It has a separate post office and ZIP code (04057) from the rest of Bridgton, although this ZIP code serves only mail delivered to post office boxes in the North Bridgton Post Office; street delivery in North Bridgton carries the Bridgton address and ZIP code (04009). The area has magnificent views of Long Lake.
- South Bridgton is to the south of Bridgton. It is located mainly off Route 107, near Sebago. The most central portion of the area is near Adams Pond and features the South Bridgton Congregational Church.
- Sandy Creek is centered around Sandy Creek Road, near the junction of Routes 107 and 117. There are multiple summer camps in this area, and it is primarily residential.
- West Bridgton is bordered to the south by Denmark and to the west by Fryeburg. The main area of development here is on Route 302, from the West Bridgton Fire Station near Cedar Drive, across the Moose Pond causeway to Shawnee Peak. In addition, West Bridgton is home to Camp Winona, which has been in operation for over a century.

== Geography ==
According to the United States Census Bureau, the town has a total area of 64.24 square miles (166.38 km^{2}), of which 56.79 square miles (147.09 km^{2}) is land and 7.45 square miles (19.30 km^{2}) is water. To the east of Bridgton is Long Lake, which eventually flows into Sebago Lake and the Atlantic Ocean. Long Lake is partly fed by Stevens Brook. The source of Stevens Brook is Highland Lake, which is located just west of the downtown.

In West Bridgton, a portion of Pleasant Mountain, including the Shawnee Peak Ski Area, rises. At the base of Pleasant Mountain is Moose Pond, a man-made lake which makes up portions of Bridgton, Denmark, and Sweden. Moose Pond eventually drains into the Saco River.

=== Highland Lake ===
Highland Lake
- Location within Maine
- Coordinates: 44°05′N 70°44′W
- Primary outflows: Stevens Brook
- Basin countries: United States
- Max. length: 4 mi (6.4 km)
- Surface area: 1,334 acres (540 ha)
- Max. depth: 44 feet (13 m)
- Water volume: 24,904 acre⋅ft (30,719,000 m^{3})
- Surface elevation: 423 ft (129 m)

Highland Lake extends north from downtown Bridgton to the border with Sweden. The north end of the lake receives drainage from Stearns Pond and Black Pond in eastern Sweden, and from Duck Pond in western Waterford. The south end of the lake overflows into Stevens Brook through downtown Bridgton, and the lake was a water power reservoir for early mills. The shoreline of the lake is heavily developed with residences and seasonal cabins. Trailered boats may be launched and recovered at a town-owned ramp at the southern end of the lake. White perch thrive in the lake despite dissolved oxygen deficiency in deep water below the summer thermocline. Smallmouth bass in the lake are infested with bass tapeworm. Summer water temperatures are unfavorable for native trout, but the lake has been stocked with brown trout.

=== Climate ===
This climatic region is typified by large seasonal temperature differences, with warm to hot (and often humid) summers and cold (sometimes severely cold) winters. According to the Köppen Climate Classification system, Bridgton has a humid continental climate, abbreviated "Dfb" on climate maps. In the town of North Bridgton, Maine's record high temperature was recorded, which was 105 degrees Fahrenheit.

== Demographics ==
Historical population
Census	Pop.	Note	%±
1790	329		—
1800	646		96.4%
1810	882		36.5%
1820	1,160		31.5%
1830	1,541		32.8%
1840	1,987		28.9%
1850	2,710		36.4%
1860	2,556		−5.7%
1870	2,685		5.0%
1880	2,863		6.6%
1890	2,605		−9.0%
1900	2,868		10.1%
1910	2,660		−7.3%
1920	2,546		−4.3%
1930	2,659		4.4%
1940	3,035		14.1%
1950	2,950		−2.8%
1960	2,707		−8.2%
1970	2,967		9.6%
1980	3,528		18.9%
1990	4,307		22.1%
2000	4,883		13.4%
2010	5,210		6.7%
2020	5,418		4.0%
U.S. Decennial Census

=== 2010 census ===
As of the census of 2010, there were 5,210 people, 2,240 households, and 1,431 families living in the town. The population density was 91.7 inhabitants per square mile (35.4/km^{2}). There were 4,051 housing units at an average density of 71.3 per square mile (27.5/km^{2}). The racial makeup of the town was 96.6% White, 0.7% African American, 0.4% Native American, 0.3% Asian, 0.2% from other races, and 1.7% from two or more races. Hispanic or Latino of any race were 1.2% of the population.

There were 2,240 households, of which 24.5% had children under the age of 18 living with them, 48.7% were married couples living together, 10.4% had a female householder with no husband present, 4.8% had a male householder with no wife present, and 36.1% were non-families. 28.9% of all households were made up of individuals, and 12.1% had someone living alone who was 65 years of age or older. The average household size was 2.24 and the average family size was 2.71.

The median age in the town was 46.8 years. 18.6% of residents were under the age of 18; 8.4% were between the ages of 18 and 24; 20.2% were from 25 to 44; 33% were from 45 to 64; and 19.8% were 65 years of age or older. The gender makeup of the town was 49.2% male and 50.8% female.

=== 2000 census ===
As of the census of 2000, there were 4,883 people, 1,924 households, and 1,296 families living in the town. The population density was 85.2 inhabitants per square mile (32.9/km^{2}). There were 3,063 housing units at an average density of 53.5 per square mile (20.7/km^{2}). The racial makeup of the town was 97.36% White, 0.47% Black or African American, 0.27% Native American, 0.27% Asian, 0.23% from other races, and 1.41% from two or more races. Hispanic or Latino of any race were 0.82% of the population.

There were 1,924 households, out of which 29.7% had children under the age of 18 living with them, 51.4% were married couples living together, 11.4% had a female householder with no husband present, and 32.6% were non-families. 25.8% of all households were made up of individuals, and 11.3% had someone living alone who was 65 years of age or older. The average household size was 2.50 and the average family size was 2.85.

In the town, the population was spread out, with 22.1% under the age of 18, 10.5% from 18 to 24, 25.9% from 25 to 44, 25.6% from 45 to 64, and 15.9% who were 65 years of age or older. The median age was 40 years. For every 100 females, there were 100.3 males. For every 100 females age 18 and over, there were 98.2 males.

The median income for a household in the town was $36,722, and the median income for a family was $42,392. Males had a median income of $29,614 versus $21,548 for females. The per capita income for the town was $17,352. About 9.3% of families and 15.7% of the population were below the poverty line, including 12.6% of those under age 18 and 4.8% of those age 65 or over.

== Sites of interest ==
- Benjamin Cleaves House
- Dalton Holmes Davis Memorial Library
- Lt. Robert Andrews House
- Narramissic (Peabody-Fitch Farm) & Bridgton Historical Society Museum
- Rufus Porter Museum
- Pleasant Mountain Ski Area
- South Bridgton Congregational Church
- Spratt-Mead Museum
- Stone House
- Wales and Hamblen Store
- Walker Memorial Hall
- William F. Perry House
- Bridgton Hospital
- Pondicherry Park

== Notable people ==
- William Pitt Fessenden, Abraham Lincoln's Secretary of Treasury
- John Ripley Freeman, civil and hydraulic engineer
- Olive Fremstad, mezzo-soprano and soprano opera singer
- Marsden Hartley, artist
- Ian Harvie, comedian and actor on television
- Stephen King, author
- George D. Libby, soldier
- Nathaniel Littlefield, congressman
- Lois Lowry, author
- Jim Mains, pitcher in Major League Baseball
- Willard Mains, baseball player
- Luther F. McKinney, minister, congressman, ambassador, orator and soldier
- David Nolan, author and historian
- Rufus Porter, artist and founder of Scientific American magazine
- Karl L. Rankin, ambassador to China and Yugoslavia
- William P. Rounds, Wisconsin politician
- Seba Smith, author and humorist
- Sarah Katherine Taylor, evangelist, temperance activist, newspaper editor

== See also ==
- Bridgton Academy
- Bridgton and Saco River Railroad
