= Soldiers' Monument (Bridgton, Maine) =

War memorial

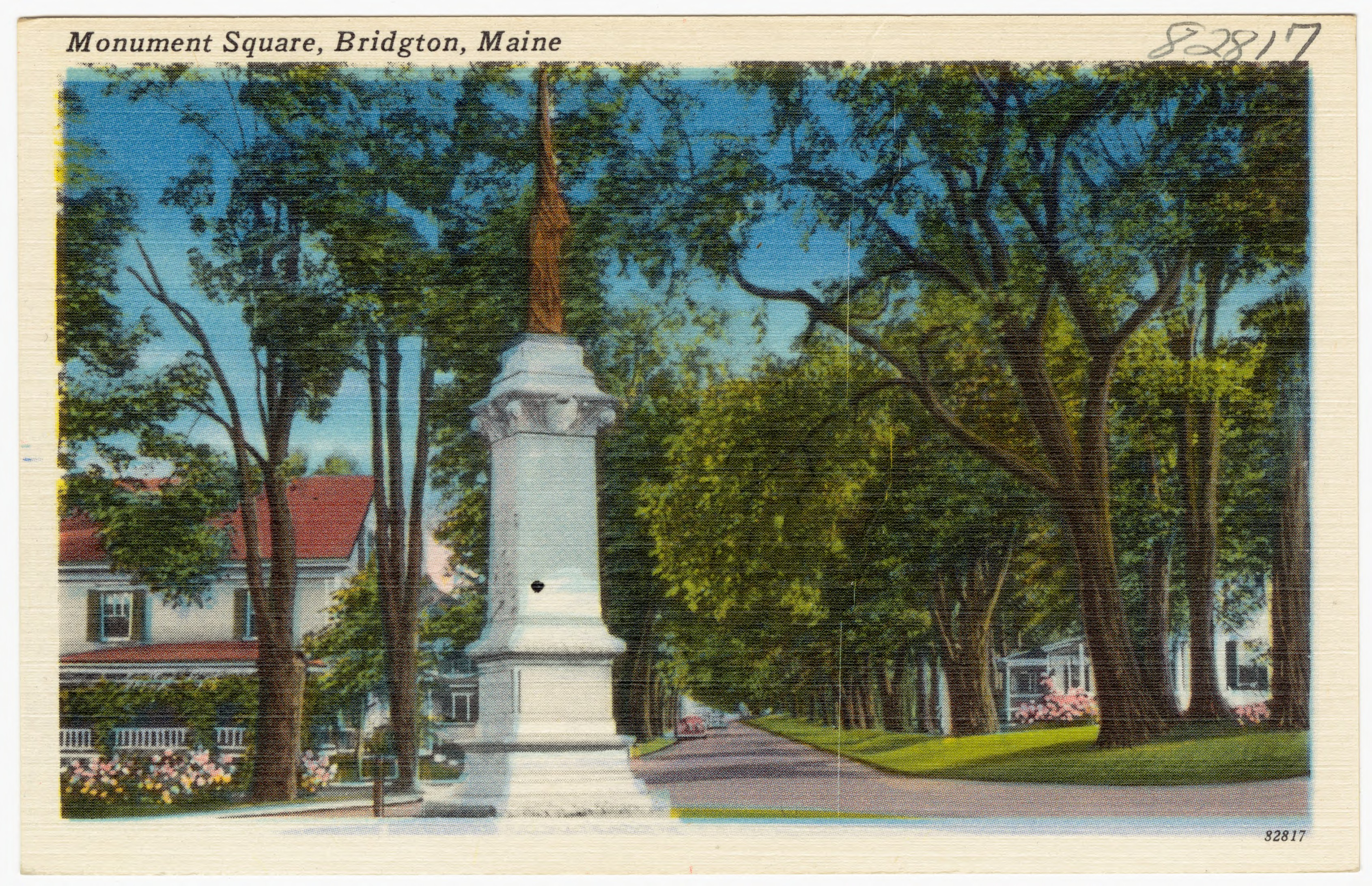
- Postcard of the Soldiers' Monument
- Interactive map of Soldiers' Monument
- Coordinates: 44°03′13″N 70°42′52″W
- Builder: Hallowell Granite Works
- Material: Granite, Bronze
- Width: 8 feet
- Height: 36 feet
- Dedicated date: 21 July 1910
- Dedicated to: Bridgton's sons who defended the Union

The Soldiers' Monument is a war memorial located at the head of Main Hill on the west end of downtown Bridgton, Maine. The memorial stands 36 feet high and features a 13.5 foot tall bronze statue of a soldier on its pedestal. The monument honors the many Civil War enlistments from Bridgton, which numbered 79 in 1861, 75 in 1862, and 41 in 1863.

== History ==
There had long been a desire among Bridgton residents to erect a memorial after the close of the Civil War, but lack of funds was a major obstacle. Following a renewed effort, former Maine governor Henry B. Cleaves, originally from Bridgton, emerged as a major donor, and Hallowell Granite Works was commissioned to build the monument.

A crowd of an estimated 3,000 people turned out for the 2 o'clock dedication ceremony on Thursday July 21, 1910, many arriving by way of the Bridgton and Saco River Railroad. For the unveiling, a flag from the bronze officer's hand was unrolled and flung into the breeze, at which time the band commenced a playing of The Star-Spangled Banner. Henry B. Cleaves made the presentation speech on behalf of himself and his late brother, Nathan Cleaves, while Thomas H. Hubbard was the orator and Luther F. McKinney accepted the memorial on behalf of the town.

In 2019, the monument underwent a restoration headed by local artist Anthony Tafuri. The work was done at no cost to the town of Bridgton thanks to a $16,000 donation by Lester Baker, former resident of Harrison and owner of Pro Point Restoration in Pittsfield, New Hampshire.

== Inscriptions ==
The inscriptions on the Soldiers' Monument are as follows:

Front, Northeast face:

TO
BRIDGTON'S SONS
WHO DEFENDED THE UNION
·1861 — 1865·

PRESENTED BY
NATHAN and HENRY B. CLEAVES

Left, Southeast face:

IN HONOR
OF THE LIVING:
IN GRATEFUL MEMORY
OF THE DEAD

Back, Southwest face:

THEY STROVE THAT THE NATION
MIGHT LIVE: THAT GOVERNMENT
OF THE PEOPLE, BY THE PEOPLE,
FOR THE PEOPLE, SHOULD NOT PERISH

Right, Northwest face:

ONE COUNTRY
ONE DESTINY
ONE FLAG
