= Soldiers' Monument in Bristol, Connecticut =

Obelisk in city's West Cemetery

Coordinates: 41.7431°N 72.9539°W

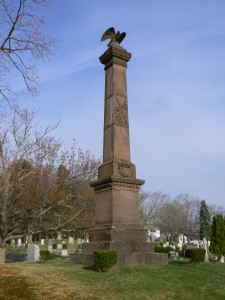
The Soldiers' Monument in Bristol, Connecticut.

Soldiers' Monument is in Bristol, Connecticut, on top of a hill in the city’s West Cemetery. The monument is an obelisk with a brownstone eagle on top. At the base on its eastern side, there is a dedication honoring the men from Bristol who fought and died for their country. To the west of the monument is a marker honoring veterans of other wars.

Each face of the Soldiers’ Monument honors several men from Bristol who died during the American Civil War, and one or more of the battles that were fought. The east face honors 14 Bristol residents who died during the Civil War, and the men who fought and died at the Battle of Antietam. The north face lists 13 residents who died as prisoners of war, two residents who were lost at sea, and the battles of Fredericksburg and Plymouth. The west face lists 13 names, and the battles of Fort Wagner and Irish Bend. The south face lists 12 names, and the battles of Gettysburg and New Bern.

== History ==
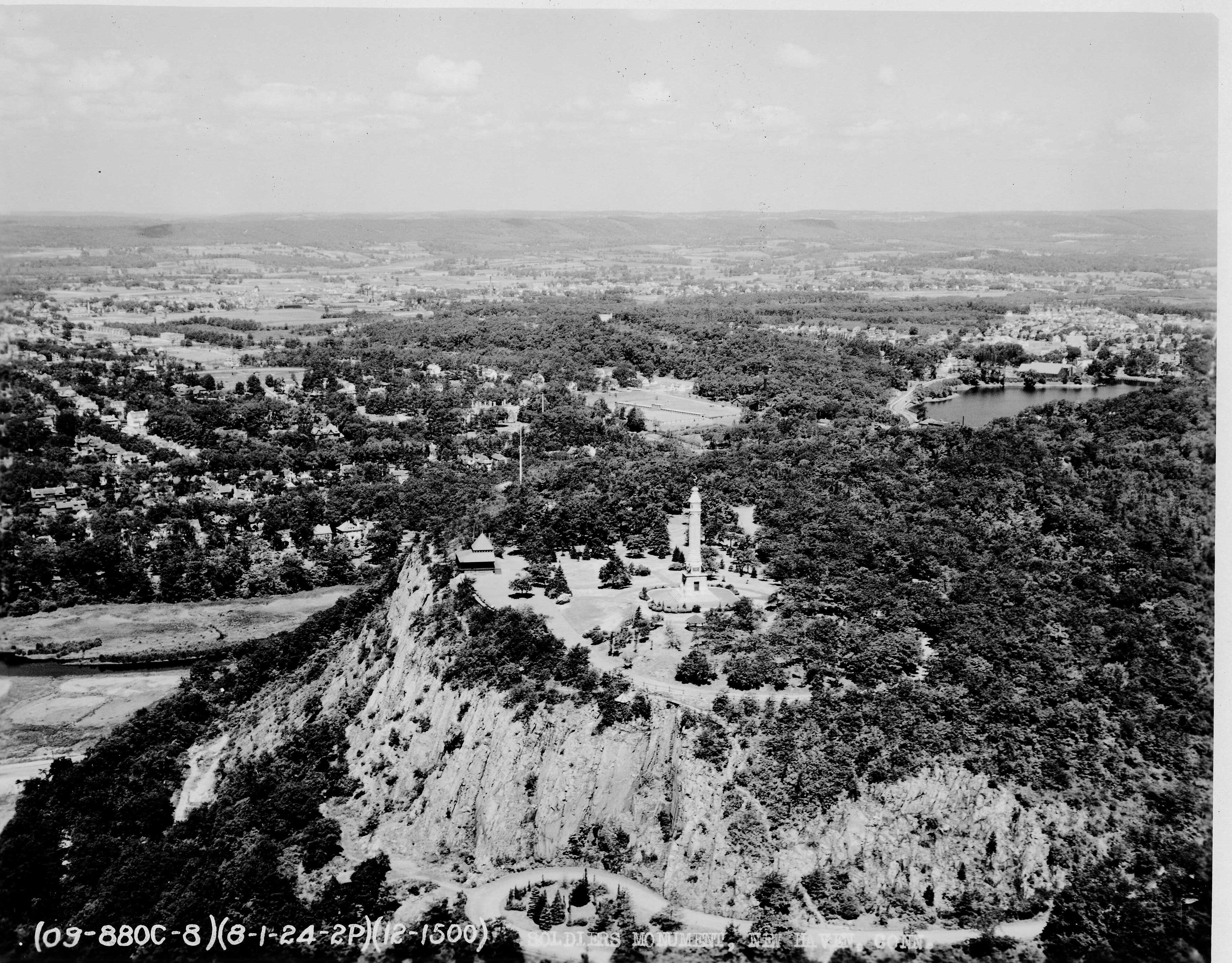
Monument in the 1930s

A committee, known as the Bristol Soldiers’ Monument Committee, was formed in 1865 when Josiah F. Peck Sr. suggested it. The purpose of this committee was to gather funds for the purpose of creating a Soldiers’ Monument. The committee decided that each member of the town should contribute $1.00 towards building a Soldiers’ Monument. However, there were logistical difficulties communicating with the 3500 people who lived in Bristol, and not all contributed. The committee also created a subcommittee, consisting of six men and seven women, whose purpose was to organize a Strawberry Festival and use the profits from the Festival to help build the monument. On October 16, 1865, Josiah F. Peck Sr. and James G. Batterson, an entrepreneur from Hartford, reached an agreement. Mr. Batterson had agreed to furnish and erect a Soldiers’ monument in Bristol. They agreed that the monument would be six feet six inches at the base, twenty five feet high, that it would be made out of the best quality Brown Portland Stone, and that there would be an inscription that is dedicated to the soldiers from Bristol who fought and died for their country. As for Mr. Peck, he agreed to complete the foundation, furnish transportation for the monument, purchase the site of land, help erect the monument, and pay Mr. Batterson $1500 for the monument and the lettering.

== Current status ==
Some of Bristol’s citizens believe that the erosion of the monument is imminent and are trying to erect a new memorial. They hope to be able to erect this new monument on Memorial Boulevard. Their goal is to have the new monument dedicated on Memorial Day 2011. In order to reach their goal of $15,000, they sold small commemorative cards and artificial roses for $1 each. A pink granite monument was erected on Memorial Boulevard in 2011.
