= Denmark, Maine =

Town in Maine, United States

- Town
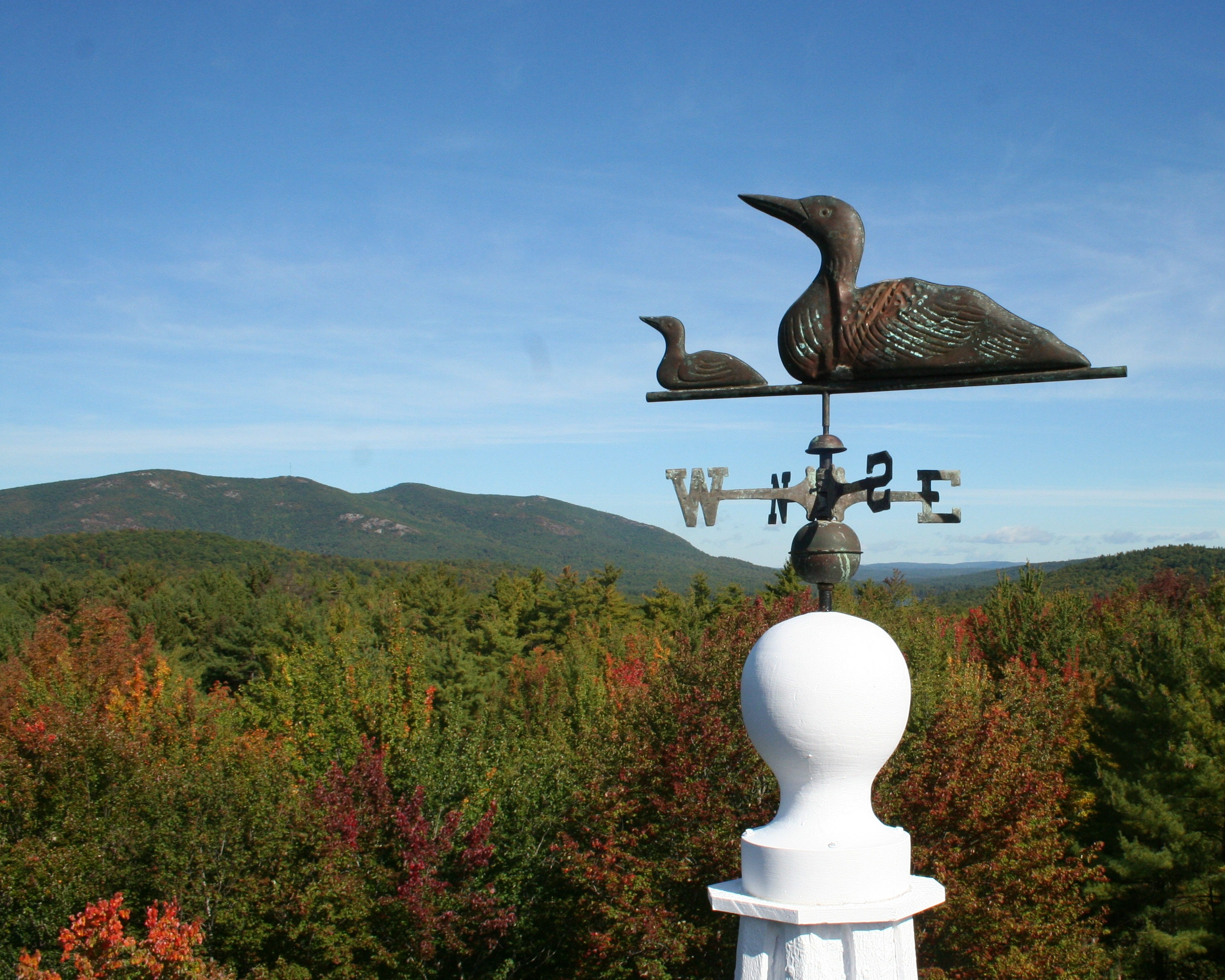
- View of Pleasant Mountain – Denmark, Maine

- Seal

- Location within Maine Location within the United States
- Coordinates: 43°59′43″N 70°48′26″W
- Country: United States
- State: Maine
- County: Oxford
- Incorporated: 1807

Area
  - Total: 49.93 sq mi (129.32 km^{2})
  - Land: 46.12 sq mi (119.45 km^{2})
  - Water: 3.81 sq mi (9.87 km^{2})
- Elevation: 486 ft (148 m)

Population (2020)
  - Total: 1,197
  - Density: 26/sq mi (10/km^{2})
- Time zone: UTC-5 (Eastern (EST))
  - Summer (DST): UTC-4 (EDT)
- ZIP code: 04022
- Area code: 207
- FIPS code: 23-17250
- GNIS feature ID: 582438
- Website: denmarkmaine.org

Denmark is a town in Oxford County, Maine, United States. The population was 1,197 at the 2020 census. A number of ponds and lakes are located within the town.

== History ==
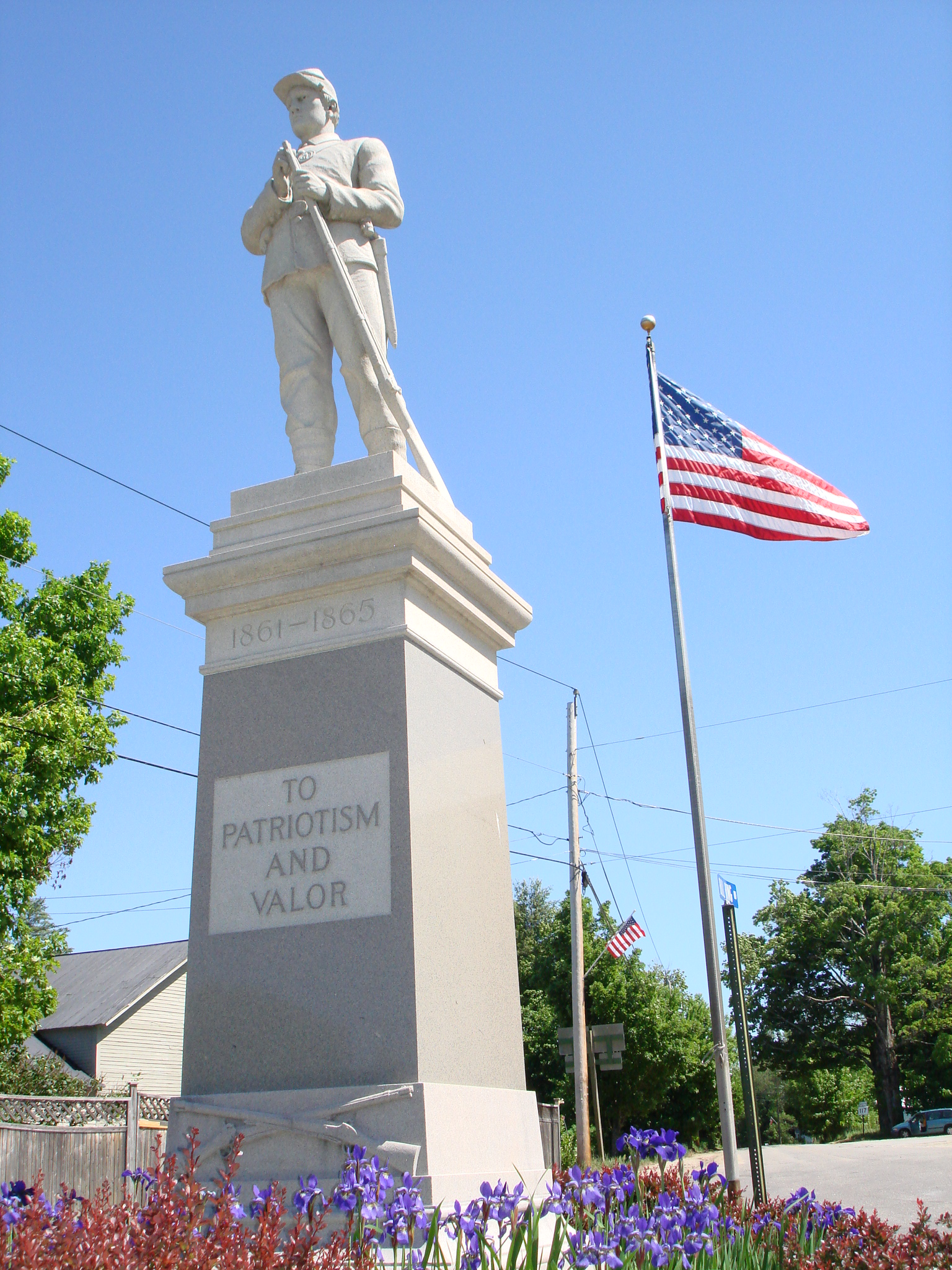
Denmark American Civil War Monument

The land was once part of Pequawket (now Fryeburg), village of the Sokokis Abenaki Indians. Attacked by Captain John Lovewell in 1725 during Dummer's War, the tribe abandoned the area and fled to Canada. The township combined a grant made by the Massachusetts General Court to Fryeburg Academy, Foster's Gore and a strip from Brownfield. Several settlers came from Andover, Massachusetts. It was incorporated as Denmark on February 20, 1807 in the state of Massachusetts. Residents proposed several names and at the incorporation ceremony in the legislature, the governor selected Denmark as the official name. At present time, the reasons behind the name has become unclear, despite speculation. The town is not a Danish community.

Farmers found the soil to be very stony and sandy, producing fair yields of potatoes, corn and oats. But the town did have excellent water powers at the streams, and mills were established to manufacture grain, long lumber, barrel staves, sashes, blinds and doors. Denmark Village was established at the foot of Moose Pond, whose outlet, Moose Pond Brook, provided the best water-power site. Today, the town is site of summer camps. Camp Wyonegonic, founded 1902, is the oldest girls' camp in the country. Also in Denmark is Camp Walden, established in 1916. Founded in 1994, the Denmark Arts Center is the latest addition to the town's culture.

== Geography ==
According to the United States Census Bureau, Denmark has a total area of 49.93 square miles (129.32 km^{2}), of which 46.12 square miles (119.45 km^{2}) is land and 3.81 square miles (9.87 km^{2}) is water. Denmark is drained by Moose Pond Brook and the Saco River. The largest of its many ponds is Moose Pond, which is approximately 8 miles (13 km) long.

The town is crossed by State Routes 117 and 160. It is bordered by the towns of Bridgton to the northeast, Sebago to the southeast, Hiram to the south, Brownfield to the southwest, and Fryeburg to the northwest.

== Demographics ==
Historical population
Census	Pop.	Note	%±
1810	436		—
1820	792		81.7%
1830	954		20.5%
1840	1,143		19.8%
1850	1,203		5.2%
1860	1,171		−2.7%
1870	1,069		−8.7%
1880	904		−15.4%
1890	755		−16.5%
1900	634		−16.0%
1910	596		−6.0%
1920	576		−3.4%
1930	474		−17.7%
1940	532		12.2%
1950	447		−16.0%
1960	376		−15.9%
1970	397		5.6%
1980	672		69.3%
1990	855		27.2%
2000	1,004		17.4%
2010	1,148		14.3%
2020	1,197		4.3%
U.S. Decennial Census

As of 2000, the median income for a household in the town was $45,885, and the median income for a family was $57,625. The per capita income for the town was $28,563. About 5.4% of families and 7.8% of the population were below the poverty line, including 12.2% of those under age 18 and 6.9% of those age 65 or over.

=== 2010 census ===
As of the census of 2010, there were 1,148 people, 479 households, and 330 families residing in the town. The population density was 24.9 inhabitants per square mile (9.6/km^{2}). There were 1,075 housing units at an average density of 23.3 per square mile (9.0/km^{2}). The racial makeup of the town was 98.4% White, 0.4% African American, 0.1% Native American, 0.3% Asian, 0.3% from other races, and 0.5% from two or more races. Hispanic or Latino of any race were 0.3% of the population.

There were 479 households, of which 28.6% had children under the age of 18 living with them, 57.6% were married couples living together, 6.7% had a female householder with no husband present, 4.6% had a male householder with no wife present, and 31.1% were non-families. 23.0% of all households were made up of individuals, and 8.3% had someone living alone who was 65 years of age or older. The average household size was 2.40 and the average family size was 2.80.

The median age in the town was 46.6 years. 21.7% of residents were under the age of 18; 5% were between the ages of 18 and 24; 20.5% were from 25 to 44; 36.4% were from 45 to 64; and 16.4% were 65 years of age or older. The gender makeup of the town was 52.0% male and 48.0% female.

== Government ==
Denmark has a town meeting-selectmen-town manager form of government and is governed by a municipal charter. The three-member board of selectmen is elected at large on a non-partisan basis for staggered three-year terms. The town manager is appointed by the board of selectmen for an initial term of up to two years and may be reappointed in successive terms of up to three years each.

== Education ==
The school system that serves Denmark is known as Maine School Administrative District 72 or MSAD 72. MSAD 72 also serves the municipalities of Brownfield, Fryeburg, Lovell, Stoneham, Stowe and Sweden in addition to Denmark.

== Notable people ==
- Nathaniel Cobb Deering, US congressman
- Richard L. Dunn, state legislator (1962–1972)
- Rufus Ingalls, Civil War era general
- Nancy Masterton, state legislator (1977–1984)
- James W. Milliken, Michigan state senator
- Hazen S. Pingree, 24th governor of Michigan (1897–1901), mayor of Detroit (1889–1897)
- Ralph Sarty, state legislator (2007–2012)

== Gallery ==
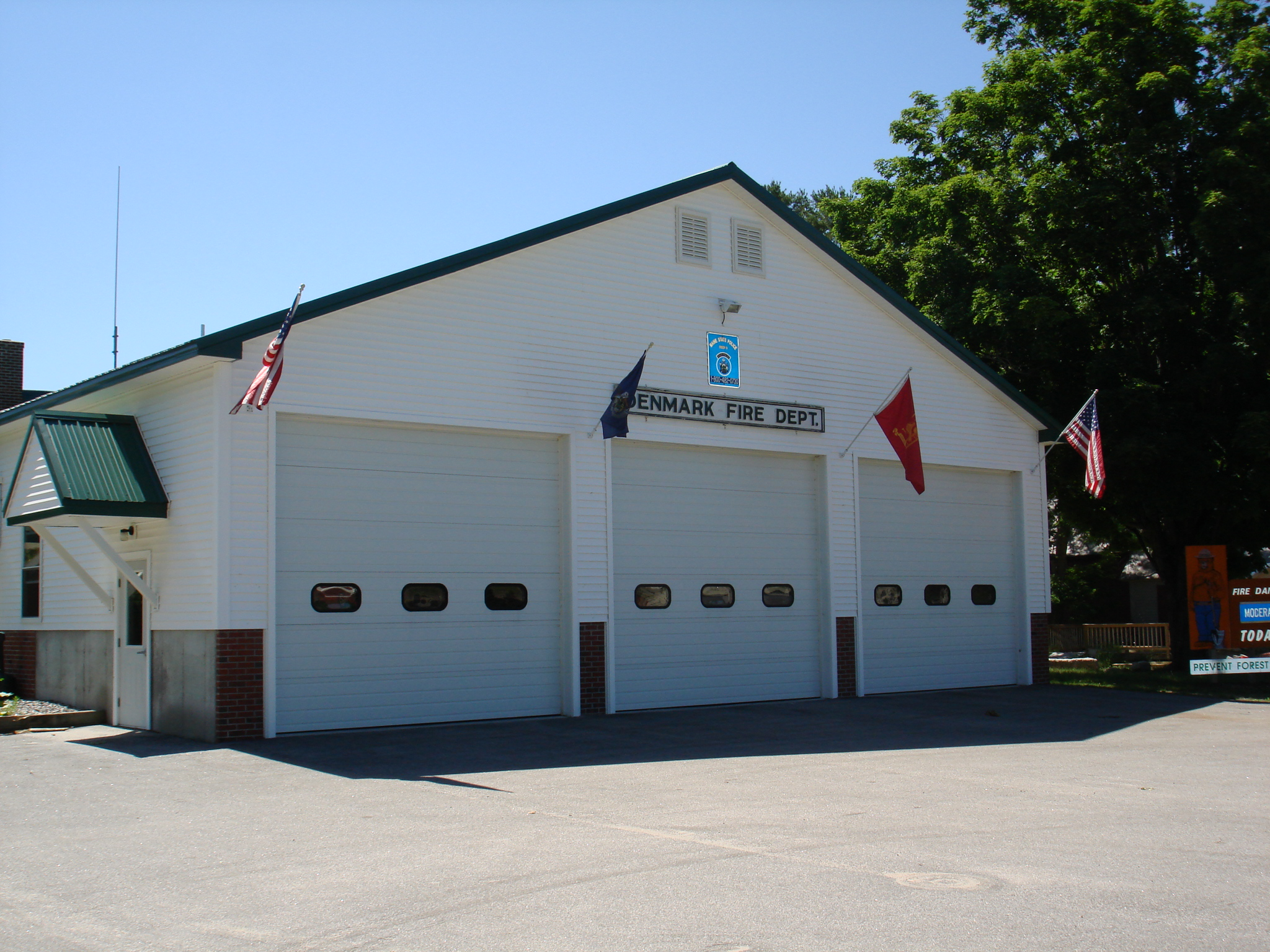
Denmark Fire Station 2008

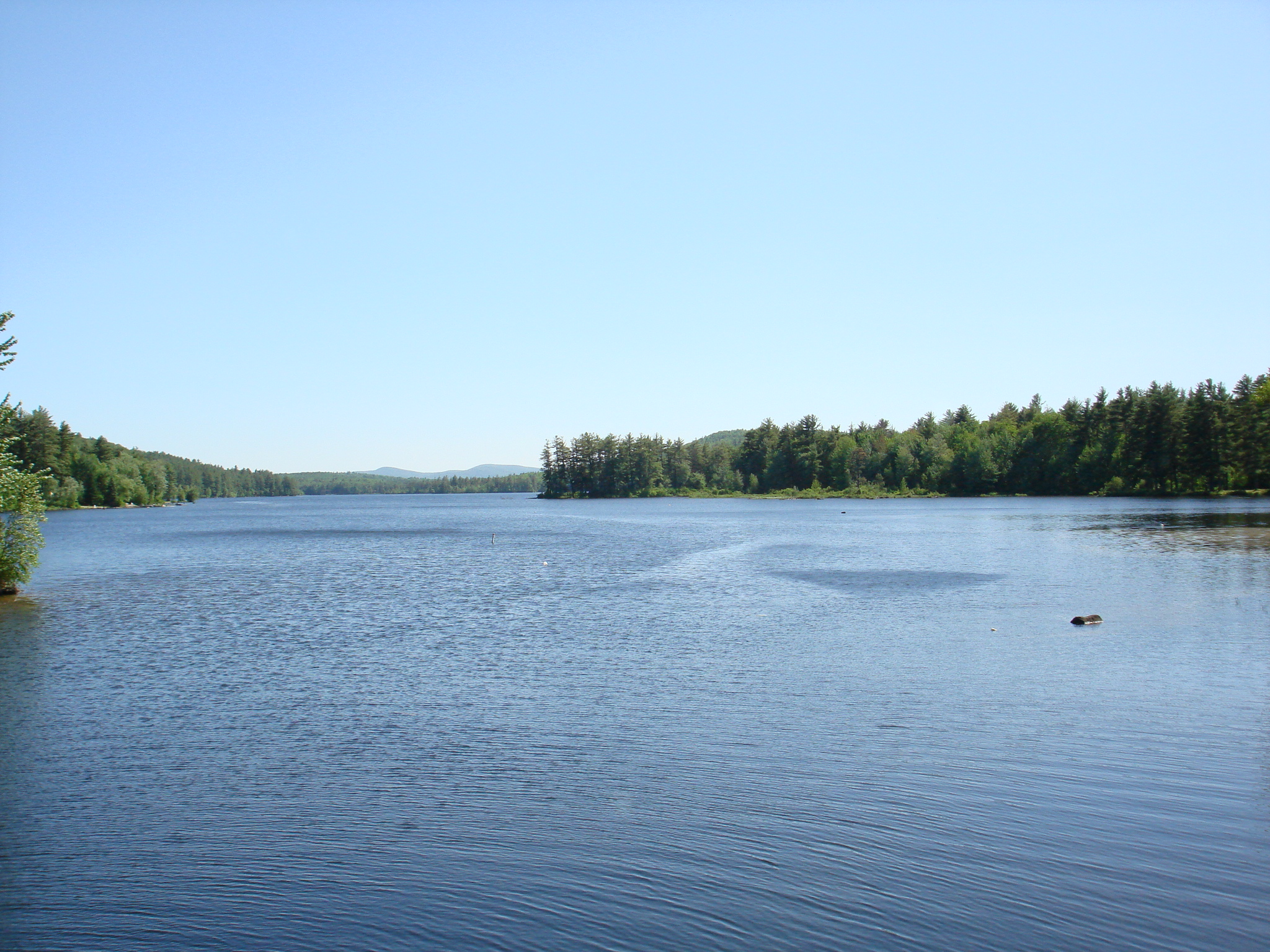
Moose Pond – Denmark, Maine 2008

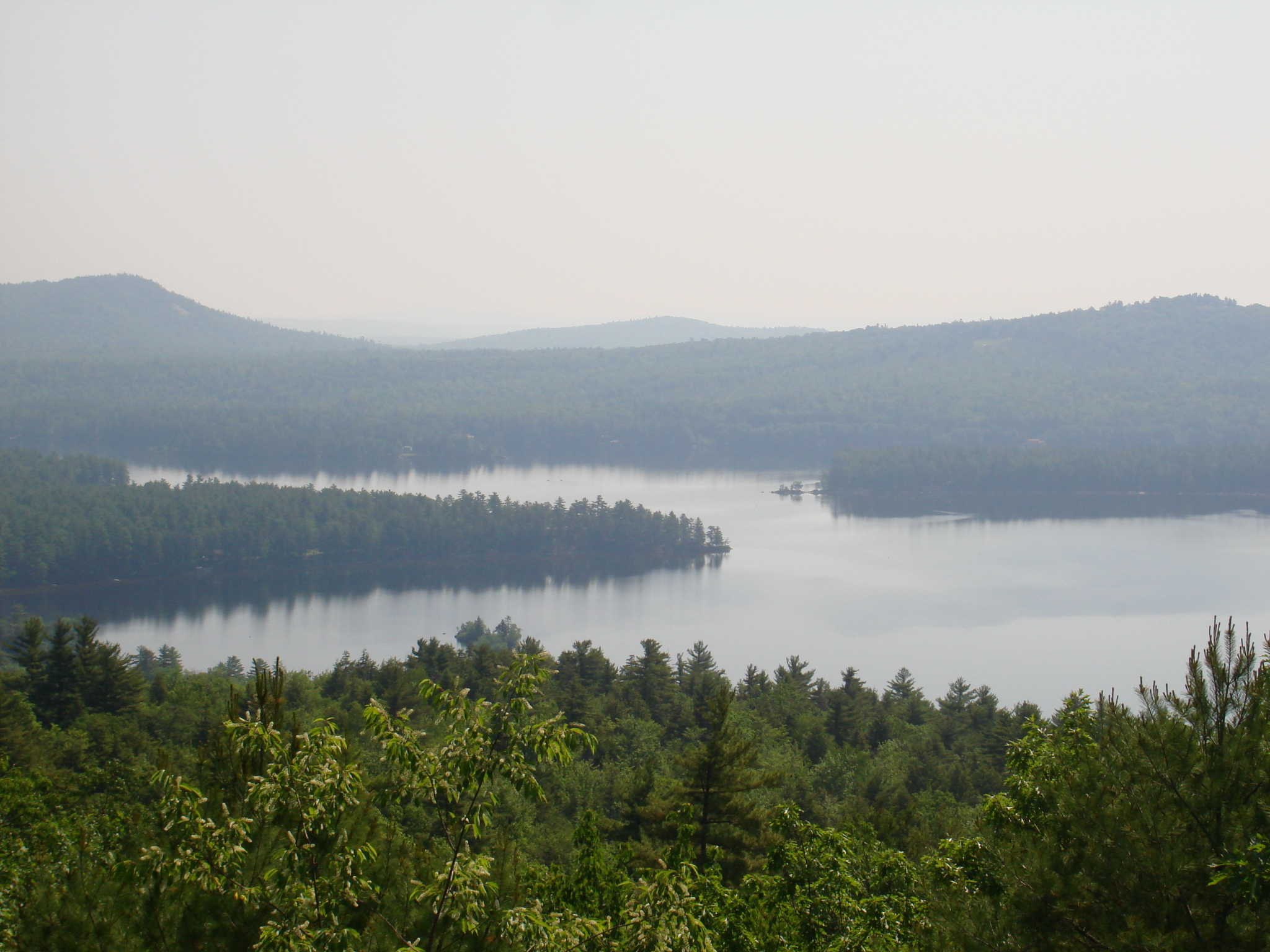
Hancock Pond – Denmark, Maine 2008
