= Soldiers' and Sailors' Monument =

Monuments memorializing both soldiers and sailors may refer to:

== United States ==
=== Connecticut ===
- Soldiers' and Sailors' Memorial Arch, Hartford
- Soldiers and Sailors Monument (New Haven)

=== Indiana ===
- Soldiers and Sailors Monument (Delphi, Indiana)
- Soldiers' and Sailors' Monument (Indianapolis)

=== Maine ===
- Soldiers' and Sailors' Monument (Portland, Maine)

=== Maryland ===
- Union Soldiers and Sailors Monument, Baltimore

=== Massachusetts ===
- Soldiers and Sailors Monument (Boston)

=== Michigan ===
- Michigan Soldiers' and Sailors' Monument, Detroit

=== New Hampshire ===
- Soldiers and Sailors Monument (Nashua, New Hampshire)

=== New Jersey ===
- Soldiers and Sailors Monument, Tennent

=== New York ===
- Soldiers and Sailors Monument, in Lafayette Square (Buffalo, New York)
- Soldiers' and Sailors' Arch, Brooklyn, in the Grand Army Plaza
- Lewis County Soldiers' and Sailors' Monument, Lowville
- Soldiers' and Sailors' Monument (Manhattan)
- Soldiers and Sailors Monument (Jamaica, Queens, New York)
- Soldiers' and Sailors' Monument (Rochester, New York)
- Soldiers and Sailors Monument (Syracuse, New York)
- Soldiers and Sailors Monument (Troy, New York)

=== North Carolina ===
- Soldiers and Sailors Monument (Raleigh, North Carolina)

=== Ohio ===
- Soldiers' and Sailors' Monument (Cleveland)
- Soldiers' and Sailors' Monument (Elyria, Ohio)

=== Pennsylvania ===
- Soldiers' and Sailors' Monument (Allentown, Pennsylvania)
- Soldiers and Sailors of the Confederacy Monument, Gettysburg
- Soldiers and Sailors Monument (Lancaster, Pennsylvania)

=== Rhode Island ===
- Soldiers and Sailors Monument (Providence)
- Confederate Soldiers and Sailors Monument, Richmond

== See also ==
- Soldiers and Sailors Memorial Coliseum, Evansville, Indiana
- Soldiers and Sailors Memorial Hall and Museum, Pittsburgh, Pennsylvania
- Soldiers and Sailors Memorial Auditorium, Chattanooga, Tennessee
- Mansfield Memorial Museum, originally Soldiers and Sailors Memorial Hall in Mansfield, Ohio
