= Gorham =

Gorham may refer to:

== Places in the United States ==
- Gorham, Illinois
- Gorham, Kansas
- Gorham, Maine
  - Gorham (CDP), Maine
  - Gorham High School (Maine)
  - Gorham Academy
  - Gorham Historic District
  - Gorham School District
- Gorham, New Hampshire
  - Gorham (CDP), New Hampshire
  - Gorham Airport
  - Gorham High School (New Hampshire)
  - Gorham station
- Gorham, New York
  - Gorham (hamlet), New York
- Gorham, North Dakota
- Gorham Township, Fulton County, Ohio

== Other uses ==
- Gorham (surname), including a list of people with the name
- Gorham, an Australian thoroughbred horse, winner of the 1981 Expressway Stakes
- Gorham Manufacturing Company, an American silver manufacturing and bronze foundry company
- Gorham Co. v. White (1872), a United States Supreme Court case concerning design patent infringement
- Gorham's disease, a very rare skeletal condition

== See also ==
- Goreham, a surname
- Gorham House, in Loudonville, Albany County, New York, U.S.
- Gorham's Bluff, Alabama, U.S.
- Gorham's Cave, in Gibraltar
- Gorham's Rangers, a ranger unit raised in colonial North America
- Phelps and Gorham Purchase, a 1788 land deal in what is now western New York state
