= List of presidents of the University of Southern Maine =

President of University of Southern Maine
- Incumbent; Jacqueline Edmondson since July 1, 2022
- Residence: President's House, Gorham, Maine
- Term length: Determined by board of trustees
- Inaugural holder: William Corthell
- Formation: 1878
- Salary: $290,000
- Website: http://usm.maine.edu/pres

This is a list of the presidents of the University of Southern Maine.

== List of presidents ==
Number	Name	Years	Length	Notes
1	1878–1905	William J. Corthell	27 years	Corthell Hall, Corthell Concert Hall, School of Music, Gorham
2	1905–1940	Walter E. Russell	35 years	Russell Hall, Department of Theatre, Gorham
3	1940–1960	Francis L. Bailey	20 years	Bailey Hall, Gorham
4	1960–1970	Kenneth T.H. Brooks	10 years	Brooks Student Center, Gorham
5	1970–1971	William MacLeod (interim)	1 year	Interim president during merge of UMaine Portland and Gorham State College
6	1971–1973	Louis J.P. Calisti	2 years	
7	1973	Walter P. Fridinger (interim)	>1 year	
8	1973–1978	N. Edd Miller	5 years	
9	1978–1979	Kenneth W. Allen (interim)	1 year	Interim president during conversion to the University of Southern Maine
10	1979–1986	Robert L. Woodbury	7 years	Woodbury Campus Center, Portland (demolished 2021)
11	1986–1991	Patricia R. Plante	5 years	
12	1991–2007	Richard Pattenaude	16 years	Left to become chancellor of UMaine System
13	2007–2008	Joseph S. Wood (interim)	1 year	
14	2008–2012	Selma Botman	4 years	Left to work in the Office of the Chancellor of UMaine System
15	2012–2014	Theodora J. Kalikow	2 years	Left to work on community engagement for UMaine System
16	2014–2015	David Flanagan (interim)	1 year	Appointed July 23, 2014 to serve one year until replacement named; term ended July 1, 2015
17	2015–2022	Glenn Cummings	7 years	Term began July 1, 2015; selected after Harvey Kesselman chose to remain at Stockton University. Term ended June 30, 2022.
18	2022–	Jacqueline Edmondson	2 years	Term began July 1, 2022; inaugurated on October 12, 2022
