= List of University of Southern Maine buildings =

This is a list of buildings at the University of Southern Maine.

== Gorham Campus ==
Building	Image	Constructed	Notes	Reference
ACADEMIC BUILDINGS				
McLellan House		1769-1773	Oldest brick house in Cumberland County HOUSES: Center for Education Policy, Applied Research & Education	
Academy Building		1806	HOUSES: Art Department Studios	
Art Gallery		1821	HOUSES: Art Gallery	
William J. Corthell Hall		1878, expanded 1905	HOUSES: President's suite Admissions Misc Performing Arts Classes Concert Hall Originally the sole classroom building on the Gorham Normal School campus.	
Robie-Andrews Hall		1898 (Robie), 1916 (Andrews)	HOUSES: Art Department Burnham & Kidder Lounges Residence Hall	
President's House		1906	HOUSES: Residence of the USM President	
Walter E. Russell Hall		1931	HOUSES: Theatre Department Auditorium	
Louis B. Woodward Hall		1955	HOUSES: Residence Hall	
Upton-Hastings Hall		1960 (Upton), 1968 (Hastings)	HOUSES: Campus Card Services Community Standards & Mediation IT Services Mail Services Residential Life Student Engagement and Belonging Student Affairs University Health & Counseling Services Dean of Students Residence Hall	
Francis L. Bailey Hall		1958 (classrooms) 1961 (library/classrooms) 1969 (lecture hall/classrooms)	HOUSES: Advising, Bailey Hall Cafe, CMHS/SEHD Student Affairs, Counselor Education, School of Education & Human Development, Environmental Science & Policy, Geography & Anthropology, History, Political Science, IT & Media Services, Library, Registration and Scheduling, Financial Services, Veterans Resource Center, Lecture Hall, and more offices	
Hayden L. Anderson Hall		1963	HOUSES: Residence Hall	
Warren G. Hill Gymnasium		1963	HOUSES: Costello Fitness Center Gymnasium	
John Mitchell Center		1965	HOUSES: Department of Engineering, Department of Mathematics and Statistics, Department of Technology	
Kenneth T. H. Brooks Student Center		1970	Named for former president Kenneth Brooks in 1992. HOUSES: Conference Room, Dining Services/Hall, GCAB, Husky Hideaway/Husky Hut, Student Diversity Center, Student Engagement & Leadership, University Credit Union	
Edna Dickey-Esther Wood Hall (Dickey-Wood Hall)		1970	Former residence halls, currently vacant.	
USM Field House		1998	HOUSES: Athletics Department Track, Courts	
USM Ice Arena		1998	HOUSES: Ice Arena Alumni Reception Area	
Harlan A. Phillipi Hall		2004	HOUSES: Residence Hall	
Upperclass Hall		2007	HOUSES: Residence Hall	
New Visual Arts Building	Click here for an architect's drawing:	2027	HOUSES: Visual Arts program	
OFFICE SPACES				
Public Safety Building			USM Police	
149 State Street			Human Resources, ITMS/Network Maine, Payroll, Sustainability, Employment	
7 College Avenue			TRIO Program	
51 College Avenue			Department of Theatre/Costume Shop	
134 School Street			ROTC Program	
30 University Way			Facilities/Maintenance	

== Portland Campus ==
Building	Image	Constructed	Notes	Reference
ACADEMIC BUILDINGS				
Alumni House		c.1804	Currently vacant. The oldest building on the Portland Campus. The left section was demolished in 2023, and the building has been moved to make way for the new Performing Arts Center.	
Albert Brenner Glickman Family Library		1919 (as bakery) 1993, 2004 (renovated into library) 2009 (Osher Map Library addition)	Osher Map Library, Library, Technology Services, Cohen Center	
Payson Smith Hall		1960	International Programs, NetworkMaine, University Counseling Services, departmental offices, Classrooms	
Luther I. Bonney Hall		1965	Academic Assessment Testing, Advising, Campus Card Services, Career & Employment Hub, Disability Services Center, Departmental Offices, Honors Center/Den, IT Classroom Technology, IT Media Services, Prior Learning Assessment, Registration & Scheduling Services, School of Business, Service Learning, Student Financial Services, Veterans Affairs, Classrooms	
James V. Sullivan Recreation and Fitness Complex		1968	Gym, Basketball Courts, Racquetball Courts, Facilities Management, Portland Health Center, Public Safety, ROCC, Veteran Resource Center	
Science Building		1969 (1st wing) 1975 (2nd wing), 2008-2012 (3rd wing)	Departmental Offices, Family Advanced Simulation Center, Facilities Management, MIST Lab, QC2 Lab, Planetarium, Bioscience Research	
Masterton Hall	Masterton Hall in the foreground, brick	1989	School of Nursing, School of Social Work	
Abromson Community Education Center		2005	Named for Linda and Joel Abromson; 520-seat lecture hall, connected to a 1,200 space parking garage, and connected by sky bridge to the campus. An additional four story parking garage was added in 2023. Conference Services, Hannaford Lecture Hall, Admissions, Professional Development, Parking Garage, Student Affairs	
Wishcamper Center		2008	Cutler Institute, Muskie School of Public Service, Office of Equity, Office of Graduate Studies, Office of the Provost, Osher Lifelong Learning Institute	
Portland Commons Residence Hall		2023	Residence Hall (580 beds)	
McGoldrick Center for Career & Student Success		2023	Dining Hall (300 seats), Student Lounge, University Store, Cafe/Pub, Career & Employment Hub, Husky Dining Room, Diversity & Multicultural Center, USM Student Government Association	
Crewe Center for the Arts	Click here for an image:	2025	Performing Arts Center, Classrooms, Visual Arts spaces	
OFFICE/DEPARTMENT BUILDINGS				
59 Exeter Street			Cumberland Legal Aid Clinic Maine Small Business Development Center	
49 Exeter Street			Office of Strategic Procurement	
47 Exeter Street			Office of Marketing and Brand Management	
45 Exeter Street			Office of Academic Affairs	
228 Deering Avenue			Dean of College of Arts, Humanities, and Social Sciences' Office	
222 Deering Avenue			Survey Research Center	
126 Bedford Street			Research Integrity and Outreach Regulatory Training and Ethics Center	
120 Bedford Street			Human Resources	
106 Bedford Street			Office of Public Affairs	
102 Bedford Street			Campus Food Pantry TRIO Programs	
98 Bedford Street			Stonecoast MFA	
94 Bedford Street			Women and Gender Studies	
92 Bedford Street			USM Free Press - Student Newspaper WMPG - Student Radio Station	
21 Durham Street			Communications & Media Studies Production Center	

== Lewiston Campus ==
Building	Image	Constructed	Notes	Reference
LAC Building		1988	LAC Library Offices Classrooms	

== See also ==
- Gorham Campus Historic District
