= Gorham Historic District =

Historic district in Maine, United States

- U.S. National Register of Historic Places
- U.S. Historic district
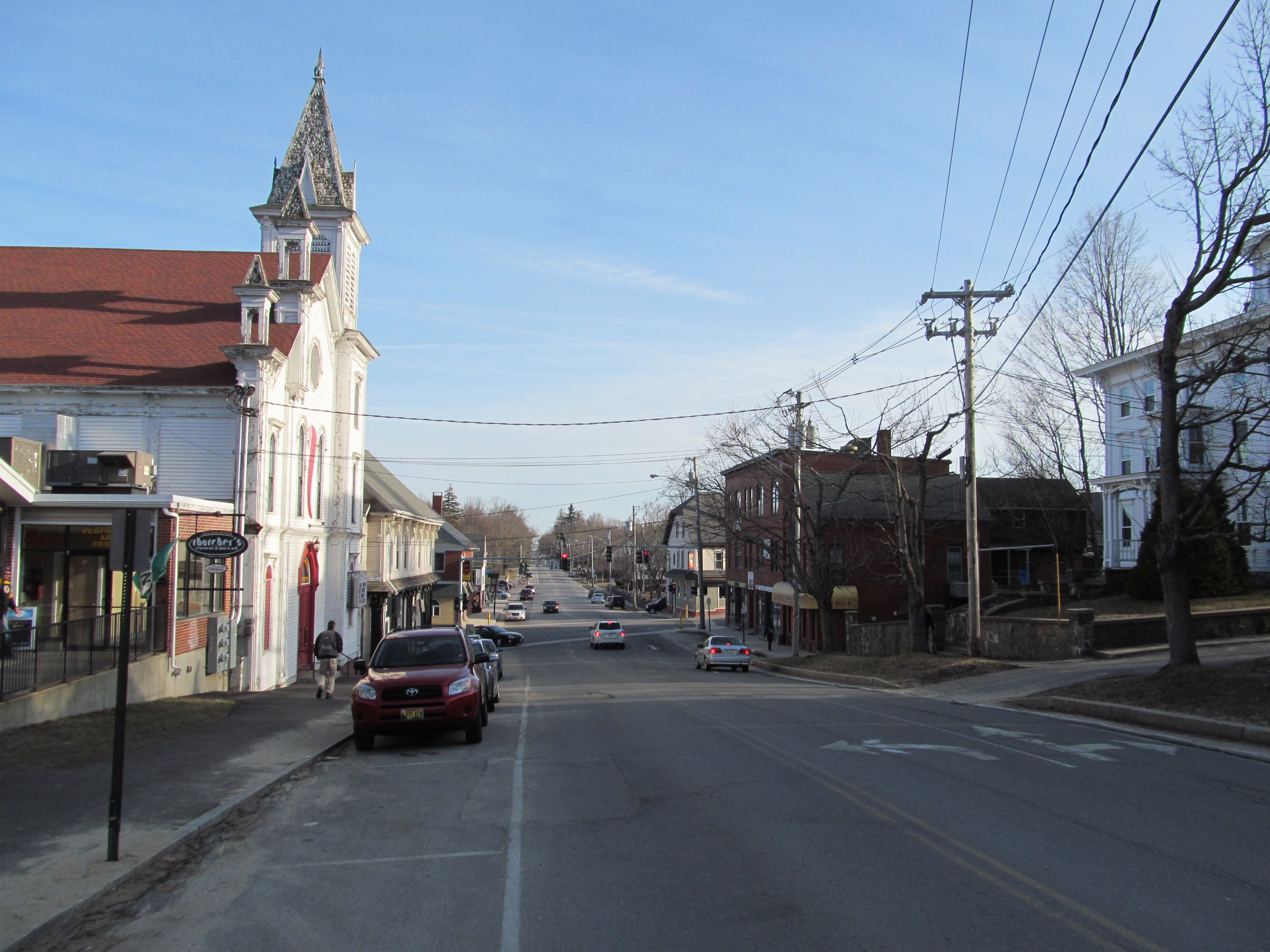
- View along School Street

- Location within Maine Location within the United States
- Location: Roughly bounded by College, Church, Cross, State and Maple Sts., including School St. from State to N of Church, Gorham, Maine
- Coordinates: 43°40′46″N 70°26′44″W
- Area: 25 acres (10 ha)
- Built: 1820
- Architect: Multiple, including Charles H. Kimball, George W. Lowell
- Architectural style: Greek Revival, Italianate, Federal
- NRHP reference No.: 92001298
- Added to NRHP: October 2, 1992

The Gorham Historic District encompasses the traditional central civic area of Gorham, Maine. Incorporated in 1764, the town center is composed of a small cluster of civic and commercial buildings at School and Main Streets, with some residential properties radiating away. Listed on the National Register of Historic Places in 1992, the district abuts the Gorham Campus Historic District, the historic core of the campus of the University of Southern Maine.

== Description and history ==
The town of Gorham is located northwest of Portland, Maine, inland from the coast of southern Maine. The town's early settlement began in the 1730s, but it did not grow significantly until the 1750s. By then, the area that is now the center had begun to take shape, with School Street (Maine State Route 114) running north–south, and Main Street (United States Route 202) running east–west, accompanied by a small grid of side streets. The only surviving 18th-century buildings in the town center are the First Congregational Church (1797), and a 1760s house that was moved into the center area in the 1830s. The remaining buildings were built mostly in the 19th century, in a variety of styles. The town's growth was influenced by the founding of Gorham Academy, which opened in 1806, and whose campus, located immediately northwest of the center, is now home to the University of Southern Maine. Most of the buildings in the district are residential houses built of wood; there are a few prominent brick commercial buildings located on School Street and at its junction with Main Street.

The district is roughly L-shaped, extending from the junction of School and Main north and west, including properties on the north side of Main Street between School and Academy Streets, on the south side of College Avenue between those two streets, and along School Street from Main to a point a short way north of Church Street. It covers about 25 acres (10 ha), and includes 42 buildings, all of which are historically significant.

== See also ==
- National Register of Historic Places listings in Cumberland County, Maine
