= Kalikow =

Kalikow is a surname. Notable people with the surname include:

- Peter Kalikow (born 1942), American real estate investor
- Theodora Kalikow (born 1941), American academic
