= Gorham Campus Historic District =

Historic district in Maine, United States

- U.S. National Register of Historic Places
- U.S. Historic district
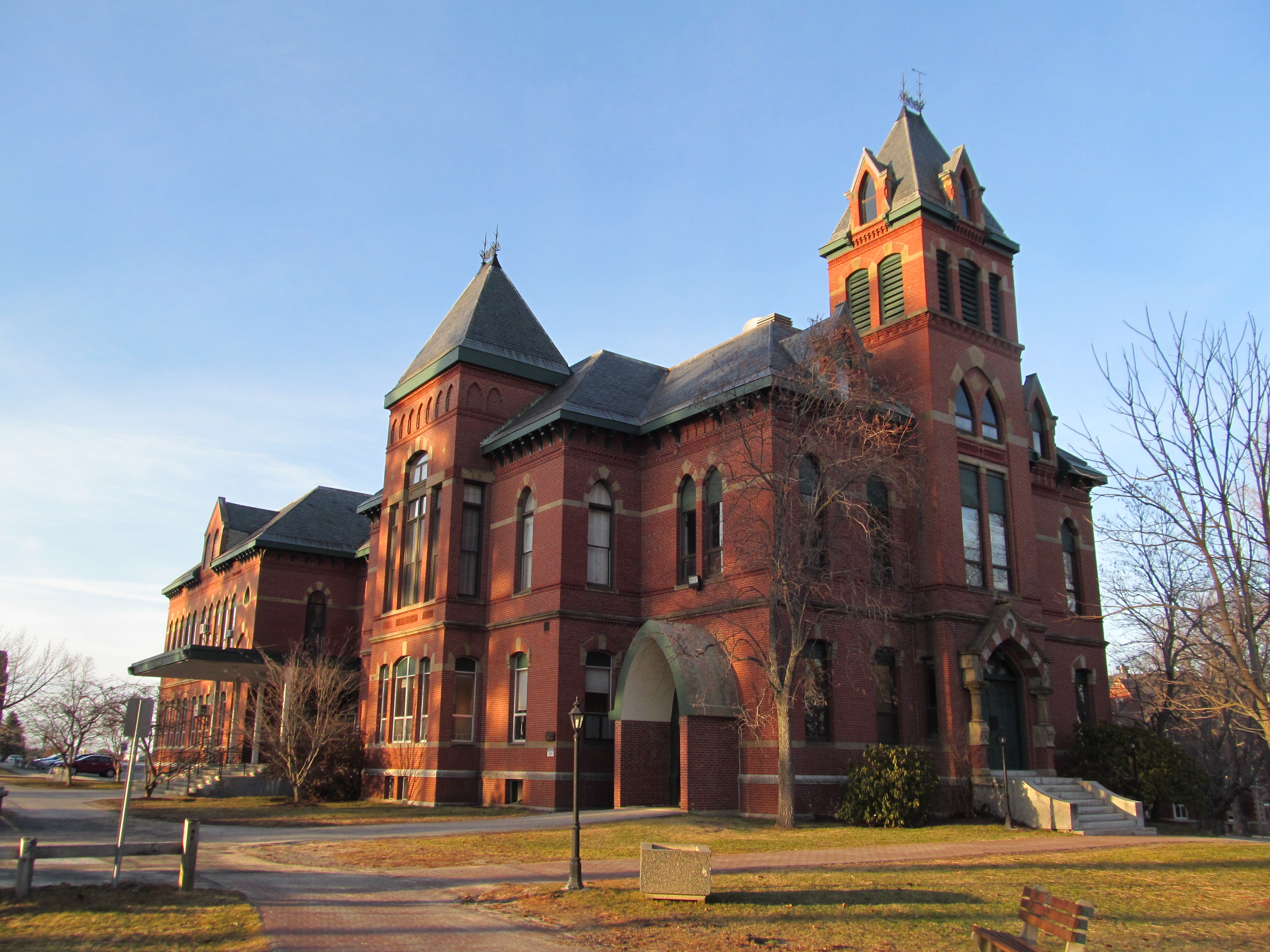
- Corthell Hall

- Location within Maine Location within the United States
- Location: College Ave., campus of the University of Southern Maine, Gorham, Maine
- Coordinates: 43°40′51″N 70°26′47″W
- Area: 12 acres (4.9 ha)
- Architectural style: Late Victorian, Gothic Revival
- NRHP reference No.: 78000171
- Added to NRHP: May 5, 1978

The Gorham Campus Historic District encompasses seven buildings that make up the historic heart of the campus of the University of Southern Maine in Gorham, Maine. Built between 1806 and 1931, they reflect the varied academic history of the campus, and were listed on the National Register of Historic Places in 1978.

== Description and history ==
Gorham Academy was chartered in 1803, and opened its doors in 1806 in the Academy Building as a boys school. Female students were admitted the following year. In 1838 the male and female schools were formally separated, creating the Gorham Female Seminary. In 1847 the school was renamed the Gorham Academy and Teachers Institute, and in 1850 the boys school was closed. It was restarted in 1861, the two schools combining as the Gorham Seminary. It closed in 1877 due to an increase in the number of public high schools. In 1878 the state opened a normal school on the former academy campus, which has, through a variety of name changes, become the University of Southern Maine.

The historic portion of the campus consists of seven buildings, two of them now conjoined, along the southern portion of University Way, one of the main access roads through the campus. Near its southern end at College Avenue stands the Art Gallery, an 1822 building that was originally a non-denominational church, and also served for a time as Gorham's town hall. To its right stands the President's Residence, a 1906 Queen Anne Victorian. North of these buildings University Way bends right, with Russell Hall, a 1931 Tudor Revival building to the left, and the 1878 Gothic Revival Corthell Hall on the right. Beyond Corthell Hall to the east stand the conjoined Robie Hall and Andrews Hall, Gothic Revival buildings dating to 1898 and 1916 respectively. To their northeast, oriented facing toward School Street (Maine State Route 114) is the original Federal style wood frame Academy Building.

== See also ==
- McLellan House, another listed building on the Gorham campus
- List of University of Southern Maine buildings, including buildings on its Portland campus
- National Register of Historic Places listings in Cumberland County, Maine
