= Cross v. United States =

Cross v. United States may refer to:

- Cross v. United States (1871), involving Congressional reference of a government contract dispute
- Cross v. United States (1892), another Supreme Court case
- Cross v. United States (1916), regarding remuneration for clerks of the court for the copying and docketing of naturalization claims
