= List of United States Supreme Court cases, volume 81 =

Supreme Court of the United States
- Interactive map of Supreme Court of the United States
- 38°53′26″N 77°00′16″W
- Established: March 4, 1789; 236 years ago
- Location: Washington, D.C.
- Coordinates: 38°53′26″N 77°00′16″W
- Composition method: Presidential nomination with Senate confirmation
- Authorised by: Constitution of the United States, Art. III, § 1
- Judge term length: life tenure, subject to impeachment and removal
- Number of positions: 9 (by statute)
- Website: supremecourt.gov

This is a list of cases reported in volume 81 (14 Wall.) of United States Reports, decided by the Supreme Court of the United States in 1872, along with a case from 1870 and a case from 1871.

== Nominative reports ==
In 1874, the U.S. government created the United States Reports, and retroactively numbered older privately published case reports as part of the new series. As a result, cases appearing in volumes 1–90 of U.S. Reports have dual citation forms; one for the volume number of U.S. Reports, and one for the volume number of the reports named for the relevant reporter of decisions (these are called "nominative reports").

=== John William Wallace ===
Starting with the 66th volume of U.S. Reports, the Reporter of Decisions of the Supreme Court of the United States was John William Wallace. Wallace was Reporter of Decisions from 1863 to 1874, covering volumes 68 through 90 of United States Reports which correspond to volumes 1 through 23 of his Wallace's Reports. As such, the dual form of citation to, for example, Christmas v. Russell is 81 U.S. (14 Wall.) 69 (1872).

Wallace's Reports were the final nominative reports for the US Supreme Court; starting with volume 91, cases were identified simply as "(volume #) U.S. (page #) (year)".

== Justices of the Supreme Court at the time of 81 U.S. (14 Wall.) ==
The Supreme Court is established by Article III, Section 1 of the Constitution of the United States, which says: "The judicial Power of the United States, shall be vested in one supreme Court . . .". The size of the Court is not specified; the Constitution leaves it to Congress to set the number of justices. Under the Judiciary Act of 1789 Congress originally fixed the number of justices at six (one chief justice and five associate justices). Since 1789 Congress has varied the size of the Court from six to seven, nine, ten, and back to nine justices (always including one chief justice).

When the cases in 81 U.S. (14 Wall.) were decided the Court comprised these nine members:

=== Justices during at least part of the Court session reported in 81 U.S. (14 Wall.) ===
Portrait	Justice	Office	Home State	Succeeded	Date confirmed by the Senate (Vote)	Tenure on Supreme Court
	Salmon P. Chase	Chief Justice	Ohio	Roger B. Taney	December 6, 1864 (Acclamation)	December 15, 1864 – May 7, 1873 (Died)
	Samuel Nelson	Associate Justice	New York	Smith Thompson	February 14, 1845 (Acclamation)	February 27, 1845 – November 28, 1872 (Retired)
	Nathan Clifford	Associate Justice	Maine	Benjamin Robbins Curtis	January 12, 1858 (26–23)	January 21, 1858 – July 25, 1881 (Died)
	Noah Haynes Swayne	Associate Justice	Ohio	John McLean	January 24, 1862 (38–1)	January 27, 1862 – January 24, 1881 (Retired)
	Samuel Freeman Miller	Associate Justice	Iowa	Peter Vivian Daniel	July 16, 1862 (Acclamation)	July 21, 1862 – October 13, 1890 (Died)
	David Davis	Associate Justice	Illinois	John Archibald Campbell	December 8, 1862 (Acclamation)	December 10, 1862 – March 4, 1877 (Resigned)
	Stephen Johnson Field	Associate Justice	California	newly created seat	March 10, 1863 (Acclamation)	May 10, 1863 – December 1, 1897 (Retired)
	William Strong	Associate Justice	Pennsylvania	Robert Cooper Grier	February 18, 1870 (No vote recorded)	March 14, 1870 – December 14, 1880 (Retired)
	Joseph P. Bradley	Associate Justice	New Jersey	newly created seat	March 21, 1870 (46–9)	March 23, 1870 – January 22, 1892 (Died)

== Citation style ==
Under the Judiciary Act of 1789 the federal court structure at the time comprised District Courts, which had general trial jurisdiction; Circuit Courts, which had mixed trial and appellate (from the US District Courts) jurisdiction; and the United States Supreme Court, which had appellate jurisdiction over the federal District and Circuit courts—and for certain issues over state courts. The Supreme Court also had limited original jurisdiction (i.e., in which cases could be filed directly with the Supreme Court without first having been heard by a lower federal or state court). There were one or more federal District Courts and/or Circuit Courts in each state, territory, or other geographical region.

Bluebook citation style is used for case names, citations, and jurisdictions.

- "C.C.D." = United States Circuit Court for the District of . . .
  - e.g.,"C.C.D.N.J." = United States Circuit Court for the District of New Jersey
- "D." = United States District Court for the District of . . .
  - e.g.,"D. Mass." = United States District Court for the District of Massachusetts
- "E." = Eastern; "M." = Middle; "N." = Northern; "S." = Southern; "W." = Western
  - e.g.,"C.C.S.D.N.Y." = United States Circuit Court for the Southern District of New York
  - e.g.,"M.D. Ala." = United States District Court for the Middle District of Alabama
- "Ct. Cl." = United States Court of Claims
- The abbreviation of a state's name alone indicates the highest appellate court in that state's judiciary at the time.
  - e.g.,"Pa." = Supreme Court of Pennsylvania
  - e.g.,"Me." = Supreme Judicial Court of Maine

== List of cases in 81 U.S. (14 Wall.) ==
Case Name	Page & year	Opinion of the Court	Concurring opinion(s)	Dissenting opinion(s)	Lower Court	Disposition
United States v. Crusell	1 (1872)	Chase	none	Davis	Ct. Cl.	affirmed
Cockroft v. Vose	5 (1872)	Miller	none	none	N.Y. Sup. Ct.	dismissed
Bank of W. Tenn. v. Citizens' Bank	9 (1872)	Swayne	none	none	La.	dismissed
Palmer v. Marston	10 (1872)	Swayne	none	none	La.	dismissed
Sevier v. Haskell	12 (1872)	Swayne	none	none	Ark.	dismissed
Steines v. Franklin Cnty.	15 (1872)	Clifford	none	none	Mo.	dismissed
Kennebec & P.R.R. v. Portland & K.R.R.	23 (1872)	Miller	none	none	Me.	dismissed
Bartemeyer v. Iowa	26 (1872)	Miller	none	Swayne	Iowa	dismissed
Ward v. United States	28 (1872)	Miller	none	Bradley	C.C.D. Mich.	reversed
Henderson's D.S.	44 (1872)	Clifford	none	Field	C.C.E.D. Mo.	reversed
Christmas v. Russell	69 (1872)	Swayne	none	none	C.C.S.D. Miss.	reversed
Hurley v. Street	85 (1872)	Chase	none	none	Iowa	dismissed
Traders' Nat'l Bank v. Campbell	87 (1872)	Miller	none	none	C.C.N.D. Ill.	affirmed
The Thames	98 (1872)	Strong	none	none	C.C.S.D.N.Y.	affirmed
Mahan v. United States	109 (1872)	Miller	none	none	Ct. Cl.	remand denied
Foulke v. Zimmerman	113 (1872)	Miller	none	none	C.C.D. La.	affirmed
The Bridgeport	116 (1872)	Bradley	none	none	C.C.E.D.N.Y.	affirmed
Armstrong v. Morrill	120 (1872)	Clifford	none	Strong	D.W. Va.	affirmed
Ex parte Newman	152 (1872)	Clifford	none	none	C.C.E.D.N.Y.	mandamus denied
The Scotia	170 (1872)	Strong	none	none	C.C.S.D.N.Y.	affirmed
The Java	189 (1872)	Bradley	none	none	C.C.D. Mass.	reversed
The Merrimac	199 (1872)	Clifford	none	none	C.C.D. La.	affirmed
The Mabey	204 (1872)	Clifford	none	none	C.C.E.D.N.Y.	affirmed
Caperton v. Bowyer	216 (1872)	Clifford	none	none	W. Va.	dismissed
Caperton v. Ballard	238 (1872)	Davis	none	none	W. Va.	dismissed
Gibson v. Warden	244 (1872)	Swayne	none	none	C.C.S.D. Ohio	reversed
Hook v. Payne	252 (1872)	Miller	none	none	C.C.D. Mo.	multiple
The Vaughan	258 (1872)	Swayne	none	Chase	C.C.D.N.Y.	affirmed
The Cayuga	270 (1872)	Clifford	none	none	C.C.D.N.Y.	affirmed
Easley v. Kellom	279 (1872)	Bradley	none	none	C.C.D. Neb.	affirmed
City of Lexington v. Butler	282 (1872)	Clifford	none	none	C.C.D. Ky.	affirmed
Bigler v. Waller	297 (1872)	Strong	none	none	C.C.D. Va.	reversed
Dent v. Emmeger	308 (1872)	Swayne	none	none	C.C.D. Mo.	affirmed
French v. Shoemaker	314 (1872)	Clifford	none	none	C.C.D. Va.	affirmed
The Laura	336 (1872)	Miller	none	none	C.C.D. La.	affirmed
The Continental	345 (1872)	Clifford	none	none	C.C.D. Conn.	reversed
Pugh v. McCormick	361 (1872)	Clifford	none	none	La.	affirmed
Insurance Cos. v. Weides	375 (1872)	Strong	none	none	C.C.D. Minn.	affirmed
First Nat'l Bank v. Pahquioque Bank	383 (1872)	Clifford	none	none	Conn.	affirmed
O'Dowd v. Russell	402 (1872)	Chase	none	none	Ga.	dismissal denied
The Steamer Webb	406 (1872)	Strong	none	none	C.C.S.D.N.Y.	affirmed
Smith v. Mason's Assignee	419 (1871)	Clifford	none	none	Sup. Ct. D.C.	reversed
Mowry v. Whitney	434 (1872)	Miller	none	none	C.C.E.D. Pa.	affirmed
Schuylkill & D.I. Co. v. Munson	442 (1872)	Clifford	none	none	C.C.E.D. Pa.	affirmed
Nicolson P. Co. v. Jenkins	452 (1872)	Davis	none	none	C.C.D. Cal.	reversed
United States v. Ballard	457 (1872)	Chase	none	none	C.C.N.D. Ohio	affirmed
Black v. Curran	463 (1872)	Davis	none	none	C.C.D. Ill.	affirmed
Dolton v. Cain	472 (1872)	Davis	none	none	C.C.S.D. Ill.	affirmed
Cross v. United States	479 (1872)	Davis	none	none	Ct. Cl.	reversed
Dirst v. Morris	484 (1872)	Bradley	none	none	C.C.N.D. Ill.	affirmed
Collins v. Riggs	491(1872)	Bradley	none	none	C.C.N.D. Ill.	affirmed
United States v. Powell	493 (1872)	Clifford	none	none	C.C.M.D. Tenn.	reversed
Phoenix Ins. Co. v. Hamilton	504 (1872)	Bradley	none	none	C.C.N.D. Ohio	affirmed
Gorham Co. v. White	511 (1872)	Strong	none	none	C.C.S.D.N.Y.	reversed
Morgan v. United States	531 (1872)	Davis	none	none	Ct. Cl.	affirmed
United States v. Justice	535 (1872)	Davis	none	none	Ct. Cl.	reversed
United States v. Hunt	550 (1872)	Chase	none	none	Ct. Cl.	reversed
Turner v. Smith	553 (1872)	Miller	none	none	Va.	reversed
Gregg v. Moss	564 (1872)	Miller	none	none	C.C.N.D. Ill.	affirmed
Philpot v. Gruninger	570 (1872)	Strong	none	none	C.C.N.D. Ill.	affirmed
The Delaware	579 (1872)	Clifford	none	none	C.C.D. Cal.	affirmed
Leary v. United States	607 (1872)	Field	none	none	Ct. Cl.	affirmed
Erskine v. Hohnbach	613 (1872)	Field	none	none	C.C.E.D. Wis.	affirmed
Mowry v. Whitney	620 (1872)	Strong	none	none	C.C.S.D. Ohio	reversed
The Key City	653 (1872)	Miller	none	none	C.C.E.D. Wis.	reversed
Delmas v. Merchants' Ins. Co.	661 (1872)	Miller	none	none	La.	reversed
New Bedford et al. Co. v. United States	670 (1872)	Strong	none	none	Ct. Cl.	affirmed
Willard v. Presbury	676 (1870)	Nelson	none	none	Sup. Ct. D.C.	reversed
