= Art Gallery (University of Southern Maine) =

- U.S. National Register of Historic Places
- U.S. Historic district – Contributing property
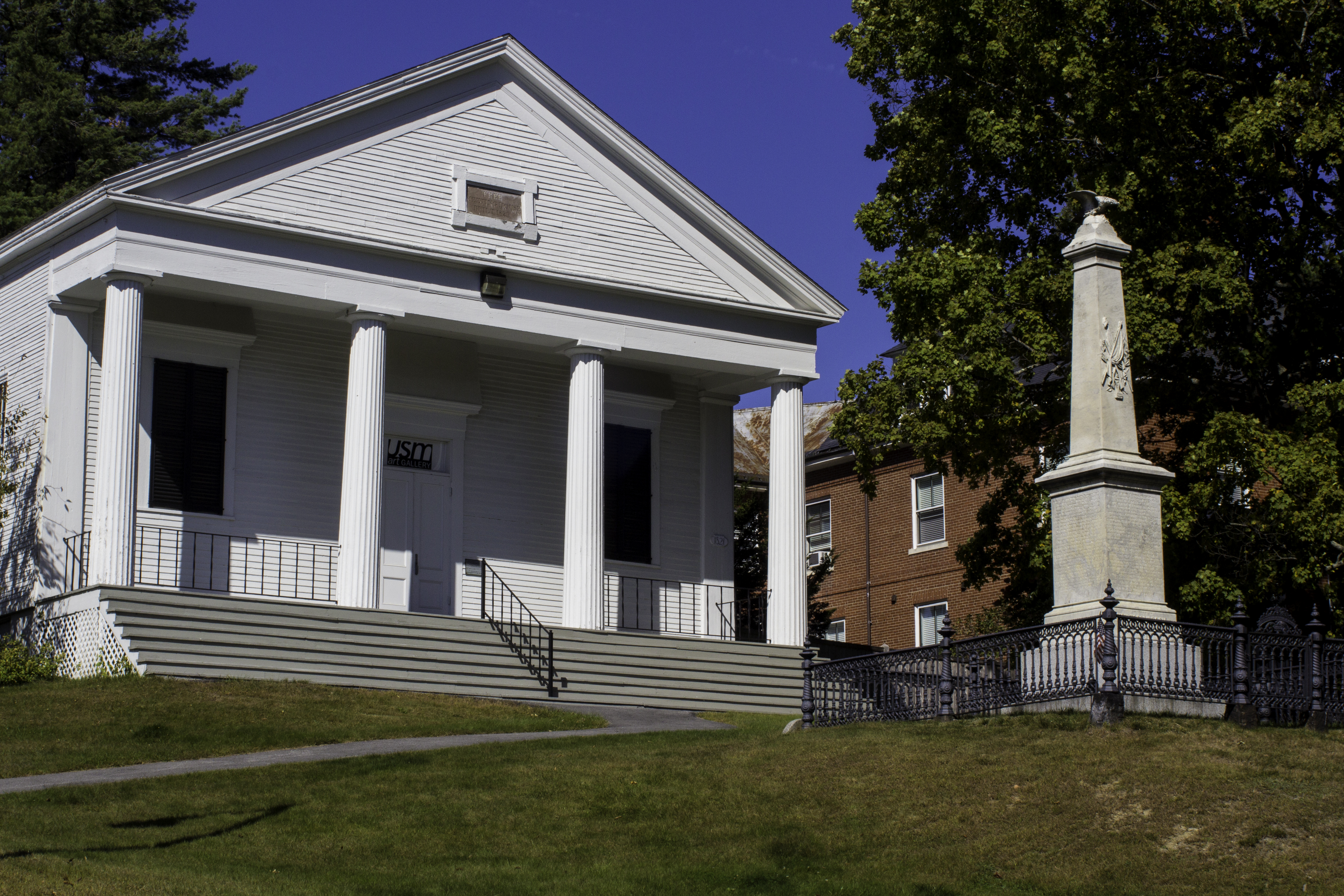

- Location within Maine Location within the United States
- Location: 5 University Way, Gorham campus of University of Southern Maine, Gorham, Maine
- Coordinates: 43°40′47″N 70°26′53″W
- Area: less than one acre
- Built: 1821
- Architectural style: Colonial
- Website: https://usm.maine.edu/gallery/
- Part of: Gorham Campus Historic District (ID78000171)
- NRHP reference No.: 72000071

Significant dates
- Added to NRHP: December 27, 1972
- Designated CP: May 5, 1978

The Art Gallery of the University of Southern Maine, Gorham campus, is located at 5 University Way, at the main campus entrance. The building in which it is located was built in 1822 as a non-denominational church building, and has also served as Gorham's town hall. It has been part of the campus since the early 1960s, and was listed on the National Register of Historic Places in 1972.

== Description and history ==
The Art Gallery is located at the southern edge of the USM Gorham campus, at the northeast corner of University Way and College Avenue, west of the Gorham town center. It is a rectangular wood-frame structure, about 42 by 60 feet (13 m × 18 m), with a front-facing gable roof, clapboard siding, and a stone foundation. The front, facing south, is distinguished by a temple facade, with four fluted Doric columns supporting an entablature and fully pedimented gable. The gable has a small rectangular opening at its center, that originally housed a window but is now boarded over. The facade behind the temple front has two sash windows flanking a central entrance. The side walls have six evenly spaced windows.

The building was constructed in 1822, primarily to provide a performance venue for the local Handel Society, a singing group that provided music to religious groups that met in the space. It was used in this capacity until 1844, when it was auctioned off. Toppan Robie, a prominent local businessman, won the auction, and promptly gave the building to the town. In return he was given the town's old town hall, and a stipulation that the building would return to his (or his heirs') ownership if it ceased to be used for town functions. The town used it for town meetings until 1960, at which time it reverted to the Robie heirs. They promptly donated the building to the state. It has since been adapted by the university for use as an art gallery.

== See also ==
- National Register of Historic Places listings in Cumberland County, Maine
