= Selma Botman =

American academic (born 1950)

10th President of the University of Southern Maine
- In office July 1, 2008 – July 9, 2012
- Preceded by: Richard L. Pattenaude
- Succeeded by: Theo Kalikow

Personal details
- Born: 1950 (age 75–76) Chelsea, Massachusetts, U.S.
- Education: Brandeis University; Oxford University; Harvard University

Selma Botman (born 1950) is an American academic. Her post at the University of Maine System (UMS) Chancellor's Office focused on expanding the systems international education programs, recruiting foreign students, and coordinating overseas faculty exchanges.

Botman was the President of the University of Southern Maine from July 1, 2008 to July 9, 2012. From Fall 2004 to June 2008, she served as the Executive Vice-Chancellor and University Provost of the City University of New York. Recently, Yeshiva University named Dr. Botman the University's next Vice President for Academic Affairs and Provost.

== Early life and education ==
Selma Botman grew up in Chelsea, Massachusetts, which she describes as a "very poor city". Her father worked in a shoe factory and his education ended at grade eight. Her mother graduated from high school but never moved on to college. Both of them encouraged their children, Selma and her two brothers, to get degrees. In the end, all of the siblings reached the level of PhD. According to Botman, "My parents promoted the importance of education, and they just expected their children would be smart."

Botman received a B.A. in psychology from Brandeis University even though she says she had no interest in the field. Instead she says she thought psychology would help her figure out who she was, which she spent her time as an undergraduate doing. At this time she developed an interest in the Middle East but believed it was too late to change majors and thus stayed with psychology until graduation.

After graduation she went to Oxford University where she got a B.Phil. in Middle Eastern Studies. On returning to the US she married Thomas Birmingham, her sweetheart from high school, and attended Harvard University where she earned an A.M. in Middle Eastern Studies and a Ph.D. in History and Middle Eastern Studies.

== Academic career ==
After Harvard, Botman began her career in education in 1987 when she taught in the political science department at the College of the Holy Cross in Worcester, MA. She was the Director of the International Studies Program from 1994 to 1996.

She moved on to being Provost at the University of Massachusetts before becoming the Executive Vice Chancellor and University Provost of City University of New York (CUNY), overseeing twenty three academic units over the five boroughs. She says that she loved being close to her daughters, who live together in New York City and work in the fashion industry, and the excitement of Manhattan, stating "I really wanted to come back to a campus, because I wanted to be closer to faculty and students."

When her younger daughter, Megan, was attending Bates College she was convinced, along with her husband, to visit Peaks Island. There the two bought a house and when, two months later, the job of University of Southern Maine President opened up, she applied for it.

Botman is a specialist in modern Middle Eastern politics. She has taught in the history PhD program at the CUNY Graduate Center and the history department at The City College of New York.

Botman has been an Affiliate in Research at Harvard University's Center for Middle Eastern Studies and a member of Middle East Studies Association, the American Association of University Women, the American Association for Higher Education & Accreditation, and the National Association of State Universities and Land Grant Colleges.

Botman was a Special Assistant to the Chancellor at the University of Massachusetts Lowell and as Vice President for Academic Affairs at the University of Massachusetts system. She was a tenured full professor in the Departments of Political Science at the University of Massachusetts Boston and Lowell campuses.

=== City University of New York ===
In the fall of 2004 she was appointed the Executive Vice-Chancellor and University Provost of The City University of New York (CUNY). According to Botman and with her leadership, CUNY initiated and coordinated several flagship programs, including the university-wide Campaign for Student Success, The Teacher Academy, the Black Male Initiative, the Latino Faculty Initiative, the Macaulay Honors College for undergraduate honors education, and a revised Distinguished Professorship initiative. She collaborated with the NYC Department of Education to establish CUNY as a national model for urban public education. Botman developed numerous programs to improve the university's visibility, to enhance the breadth and rigor of its academic programs, and to make high-quality education available to every New York City public school student.

=== University of Southern Maine ===
Botman applied to be the president of the University of Southern Maine (USM) in 2007 and was chosen for the job by her predecessor in the position, Richard Pattenaude, whose promotion to University of Maine System Chancellor opened the position, in early 2008.

In preparation for her assuming office, USM's Interim President Joe Wood sought to cut millions of dollars from USM's budget so that Botman could begin her term with a clean slate. He and the Interim Provost considered combining programs, reorganizing to remove dean positions, and cutting programs outright. In spite of these efforts when Botman became USM President on July 1, 2008 she did inherit debt instead of a clean slate, and along with it she was faced with dropping enrollment and flat state funding.

In Fall 2008, she initiated a strategic planning process, which concluded in spring 2009 with the publication of Building Maine's Future: 2009-2014. Botman attempted to guide the university through a complex restructuring effort, which she intended to increase the quality of education and to remove barriers to interdisciplinary exchange and programmatic development. She developed a five-year strategic plan, Preparing USM for the Future: 2009-2014 intended to restore the university's fiscal health. In May 2010 the University of Maine System Board of Trustees approved a sweeping academic reorganization plan that Botman oversaw, resulting from a process that included faculty and administrators on an institutional redesign team and that won approval by the USM Faculty Senate. Some faculty members were uneasy about the proposal at the time, and it would later be said that promises Botman made regarding it were not kept. It was advertised as including $1.3 billion of savings for the university each year by eliminating three dean positions, though that math was disputed and a counter claim was made that, "there's no net savings for the university." In June 2010, Botman published an editorial explaining her view of the plan.

By April 2011, the university was on track to end its budget year with a $1.5 million surplus. Botman stated that a $140 million budget was being developed that would not include layoffs, due to the ongoing reorganization and prior reductions in staff. But by February 2012 Botman announced that there was a shortfall of five million dollars and compared the university's situation to being cast out of Eden. Botman sought to establish a fund to protect the university's credit rating and maintain operations during a time of financial difficulties. When Botman became president in 2008, the university suffered from annual budget deficits and the university's rating under KPMG was 0.1; by April 2011, the rating had climbed to 2.1. During fiscal year 2011, USM consolidated eight colleges into five, which was estimated to have saved either nothing or $1 million annually. She also said she decided to resume the practice of hiring tenure-track faculty, which she said would enrich the university community and help sustain competitive academic programs.

In mid March 2012 members of the faculty began drafting a petition to force a referendum of no confidence against Botman. Around March 27 it began circulating, on April 2 news of it was first made public, and on April 4 it was presented to the Chair of the Faculty Senate which, as it had more than enough signatures, made a no confidence referendum inevitable. It was reported that a survey conducted by the faculty union indicated significant discontent among faculty regarding Botman's academic reorganization. The vote was non-binding and was intended to be passed on to the UMS Chancellor Robert Page and the board of trustees. On May 2, 2012, the vote was tallied and indicated that 75% of the faculty had cast votes, with 68% of those votes indicating no confidence. Effective July 9, 2012, Botman left her position as president to take a post at the University of Maine System chancellor's office. According to University of Maine System chancellor's office, Botman would lead an effort to expand the system's international education programs, recruit foreign students, and coordinate overseas faculty exchanges. On January 30, 2014, Yeshiva University announced that Botman would serve as its next vice president for academic affairs and provost under its current president, effective July 1, 2014.
