= The Free Press (University of Southern Maine) =

- The Free Press, February 4, 2014
- Type: Weekly student newspaper
- Format: Tabloid
- Founded: 1972
- Headquarters: 92 Bedford Street; Portland, Maine 04101
- Website: usmfreepress.org

The Free Press is the official campus newspaper of the University of Southern Maine. It was first published in 1972. It publishes a print edition weekly during the academic year, equaling roughly 22 editions a year. The newspaper has a circulation of 3,000 and prior to 2023 published daily on its website.

== History and organization ==
The Free Press was founded in 1972. It is an entirely student-run and student-funded newspaper not supported by an academic department. The university does not have a journalism program.

In 2012, the Free Press began a partnership with the Bangor Daily News to provide training, web hosting and development services for paper, as well as a content-sharing agreement aimed at promoting the best in student journalism in Maine.

In fall 2022, the newspaper made a decision to stop publishing online and updating its social media accounts. This decision was made because of lack of staff. Instead, the newspaper became a print-only newspaper.

== Controversies ==
In 2001, the Free Press gained access to the campus police log despite opposition from the local police department.

In April 2002, the USM Student Senate sought to dissolve the Student Communications Board, which had been created as a buffer between the university and the paper to ensure funding to the organization. A referendum was held on whether to dissolve the board and it lost with 16% of the vote.

== Awards ==
In 2000, the newspaper was ranked third in their region for "Best All-Around Non-Daily Student Newspaper Newspaper", while writer Steve Peoples was ranked for "General News Reporting" for his story, "Students' Voting Rights in Jeopardy". In 2002, several students involved with the newspaper won recognition by the Society of Professional Journalists for their region, including the top awards for Spot News Photography and General News Photography.
