= Jacqueline Edmondson =

Current president of the University of Southern Maine

14th President of the University of Southern Maine
- Incumbent
- Assumed office July 2022
- Preceded by: Glenn Cummings

Personal details
- Born: 1967 (age 58–59)
- Education: Pennsylvania State University (BA, MA, Ph.D)
- Profession: Education policy
- Institutions: Pennsylvania State University, University of Minnesota Morris, University of Southern Maine

Jacqueline Edmondson (born 1967) is an American academic whose research interests include education policy, teacher education, and rural education and communities. She has also published biographies for high school students and general readers, and she edited a four-volume encyclopedia on music and American Life.

Edmondson was named president of the University of Southern Maine in 2022.

== Career and Research ==
Edmondson is a three-time alumna of Pennsylvania State University. She earned a bachelor’s degree in elementary and kindergarten education in 1989 and a master’s degree in educational psychology in 1996. She earned a Ph.D in curriculum and instruction in 1999.

Edmondson was an assistant professor at the University of Minnesota from 1998 until 2000, at which point she moved to Pennsylvania State University. She was promoted to full professor in 2012. From 2017 until 2022 she was chancellor and chief academic officer at Penn State’s Greater Allegheny campus.

Edmondson joined the University of Southern Maine as its 14th president in July 2022. As president, she has overseen the completion of two new buildings on the Portland campus: the McGoldrick Center for Career & Student Success and the Portland Commons, a 580-bed residence hall. Under her tenure, the university has also broken ground on the new Crewe Center for the Arts on the Portland campus, has implemented four new undergraduate degrees, and initiated programs tied to student recruitment and retention.

== Musical Background ==
Edmondson began taking piano lessons at age 4 and, as a young adult, aspired to become a professional musician. A first-generation college student, Edmondson got her college break when Dr. Steven Smith offered her a spot in his Penn State University piano studio. But while she was drawn to a career in music, concerns over its viability ultimately prompted her to switch to an education major. Edmondson taught piano lessons for a number of years, and also played piano for musical theater productions with the State College Community Theater, the Penn State Thespians, and other organizations. Edmondson also played violin with the Nittany Valley Symphony Orchestra for four seasons. She began to study the viola in 2017. Edmondson continues to play piano and viola, and has also served as conductor for some USM performances.

== Selected publications ==
In addition to numerous scholarly articles, Edmondson published five biographies for young adult readers, including those focused on Venus and Serena Williams (2005), Condoleezza Rice (2006), Jesse Owens (2007), Jerry Garcia (2008) and John Lennon (2010). She also edited “Music in American Life: An Encyclopedia of the Songs, Styles, Stars, and Stories that Shape our Culture,” named a 2014 Outstanding Reference Sources book by the American Library Association.

== Awards and Recognitions ==
- In 2012, Edmondson received the Education Policy Leadership Forum Alumni Award from the Education Policy and Leadership Center.
- In 2013, she was presented with the Penn State Commission for Women Achieving Women Administrator Award.
- In 2014, she received the Penn State Women with Influence Recognition.
- In 2015, Edmondson received the McKay Donkin Award at Penn State.
