= Gorham (surname) =

Gorham is a surname. Notable people with the surname include:

- Arthur F. Gorham (1915–1943), American soldier
- Benjamin Gorham (1775–1845), American politician
- Christopher Gorham (born 1974), American actor
- Claire Gorham (born 1967), English journalist and television presenter
- Eville Gorham (1925–2020), Canadian-American scientist
- Frederic Poole Gorham (1871–1933), American bacteriologist
- Geoffrey de Gorham (fl. 1119–46), Norman English abbot and scholar
- George Congdon Gorham (1832–1909), American politician and newspaper editor
- George Cornelius Gorham (1787–1857), English cleric
- Graeme Gorham (born 1987), Canadian ski jumper
- Henry Stephen Gorham (1839–1920) English entomologist
- John Gorham (graphic designer) (1937–2001), English graphic designer
- John Gorham (military officer) (1709–1751), New England soldier, founder of Gorham's Rangers
- John Gorham (physician) (1783–1829), American physician and educator
- Joseph Gorham (1725–1790), brother of John Gorham (military officer), American colonial military officer and British army commander
- Justin Gorham (born 1998), American basketball player
- Kathleen Gorham (1928–1983), Australian ballerina
- Maurice Gorham (1902–1975), Irish journalist and broadcasting executive
- Mel Gorham (born 1959), American actress
- Nathaniel Gorham (1738–1796), American Founding Father
- Richard Gorham (1917–2006), Bermudian parliamentarian, businessman and philanthropist
- Rob da Bank (Robert John Gorham, born 1973), English DJ
- Sarah Gorham (born 1954), American poet
- Sarah E. Gorham (1832–1894), American missionary
- Scott Gorham (born 1951), American guitarist and songwriter

== See also ==
- Goreham
