= Cross v. United States (1871) =

- Supreme Court of the United States

Argued October 31, 1872 Decided November 11, 1872
- Full case name: Alexander Cross v. United States
- Citations: 81 U.S. 479 (more) 14 Wall. 479; 20 L. Ed. 721; 1871 U.S. LEXIS 1013; 1871 WL 14753

Case history
- Prior: Appeal from the Court of Claims

Questions presented
- What is the proper construction of 13 Stat. 591 of July 2d, 1864?

Holding
- That Cross could re-file against the United States for the additional installment payments because of the broad intent of the Congressional reference statute.

Court membership
- Chief Justice Salmon P. Chase Associate Justices Samuel Nelson · Nathan Clifford; Noah H. Swayne · Samuel F. Miller; David Davis · Stephen J. Field; William Strong · Joseph P. Bradley

Case opinion
- Majority: Davis, joined by unanimous

Laws applied
- 13 Stat. 591

Cross v. United States, 81 U.S. (14 Wall.) 479 (1871), is a United States Supreme Court case in which the Court held that the principle of res judicata did not apply to Congressional reference cases. This was because Congress' intent in referring the case to the Court of Claims was to waive the defense of time bar for the entire controversy and that such intent could not be interpreted narrowly to prevent full recovery.

== Background ==
In 1851, Daniel Saffarans leased a warehouse in San Francisco to the United States government for ten years. As part of the construction of the warehouse, Alexander Cross, purchased the property and the lease contract with the government. After occupying the warehouse for three years, the Secretary of the Treasury terminated the lease, citing the informal nature of the assignment of the contract by Saffarans to Cross. In 1856, Cross sued the United States in the Court of Claims for the delinquent installment payments, however the government prevailed by showing that the informal nature of the assignment of the lease was defective and therefore insufficient for Cross to maintain a claim. The decision of the court was sent to Congress, which in 1864 passed 13 Stat. 591. This law permitted Cross to re-file his claim against the government and waived the defense of improper assignment as a bar to recovery.

Cross refiled the suit and prevailed against the government. However, he had only sued for three of the additional years of rents, so two years after prevailing against the government, he filed a new suit for the remaining $69,515 of the claim. The government cited that the waiver of defense by Congress was only effective for the first refiling and that as the amount was known to him at that time, he should be prevented from filing the additional suit. This bar is commonly known as res judicata in that it prevents the plaintiff from refiling on a claim if he could have brought the claim in an earlier suit.

== Opinion of the Court ==
In its decision, the Court stated that Congress' intent in passing the 1864 Act was to permit him to recover for the entire controversy. As there was no limiting language in the act that would prohibit him from refiling, the Court would not read the statute to permit only partial recovery. Therefore, the Court reversed the dismissal by the Court of Claims and remanded the case to them with instructions to enter a judgment for the remaining $69,515.

== Subsequent developments ==
This opinion established the principle that Congressional statutes providing remedial action should be construed liberally toward the aim of Congress' intent in passing the statute. It also articulated the principle that if an installment payment was not overdue at the time a suit was commenced, it was not time barred from being brought in a later suit. However, while such statutes are construed liberally, in Hartiens v. U.S., the Court of Claims narrowed the meaning of Cross, by limiting its action of re-reference to looking at false or fraudulent information from the first trial and not re-hearing the entire controversy. Further, in the later Paul v. U.S. matter, the court confirmed that the principles of res judicata and stare decisis do not apply in Congressional reference cases.
