= Glenn Cummings =

American politician

13th President of the University of Southern Maine
- In office July 1, 2015 – June 30, 2022
- Preceded by: David Flanagan (interim)
- Succeeded by: Jacqueline Edmondson

98th Speaker of the Maine House of Representatives
- In office December 2006 – December 3, 2008
- Preceded by: John G. Richardson
- Succeeded by: Hannah Pingree

Member of the Maine House of Representatives from the 115th district
- In office 2000–2008
- Succeeded by: Jon Hinck

Personal details
- Born: April 2, 1961 (age 65) Bath, Maine, U.S.
- Party: Democratic
- Spouse: Leslie Appelbaum
- Children: Kiernan Cummings, Skyler Cummings
- Education: Ohio Wesleyan; Brown University; Harvard University; University of Pennsylvania
- Profession: Economist, Politician

Glenn A. Cummings was a Democratic member of the Maine House of Representatives, representing the state's 115th district. He served from 2000 to 2008, including one term as the Speaker of the House, and was termed out of office in 2008. In 2000, when he first ran for the District 115 seat, Cummings became the first candidate in Maine history to qualify for public financing under Maine's new "Clean Elections" law. In 2009, Cummings was appointed deputy assistant secretary for the Office of Vocational & Adult Education. Cummings worked for the Goodwill Hinckley School in Fairfield, Maine as president and executive director.

On September 2, 2014, University of Maine System Chancellor James H. Page announced Cummings' appointment as interim president of the University of Maine at Augusta, succeeding Allyson Hughes Handley, Ed.D.

On May 21, 2015, Page announced Cummings would become the 13th president of the University of Southern Maine, effective July 1, 2015.

On October 5, 2021, Cummings announced he would be stepping down as president on June 30, 2022. He will remain at the university as faculty.
