= Goreham =

Goreham is a surname. Notable people with the surname include:

- Kaye Goreham (fl. 1972), Australian flight attendant aboard hijacked Ansett Australia Flight 232
- John Gorham (military officer) (1709–1751), sometimes Goreham, New England soldier, founder of Gorham's Rangers
  - Joseph Gorham (1725–1790), sometimes Goreham, brother of John, American military officer

== See also ==
- Gorham (disambiguation)
