= Theodora Kalikow =

American academic and activist

13th President of the University of Maine at Farmington
- In office 1994–2012

Personal details
- Born: Theodora June Kalikow; 1941 (age 84–85) Swampscott, Massachusetts, U.S.
- Domestic partner: Deb Pluck
- Education: A.B., chemistry, Wellesley College; Sc.M. philosophy, Massachusetts Institute of Technology; PhD, philosophy, Boston University
- Occupation: Academic, activist, author

Theodora June Kalikow (born 1941) is an American academic, university president, author, and women's rights advocate. Holder of a master's degree and PhD in philosophy, she taught at Southeastern Massachusetts University for 17 years before becoming Dean of the College of Arts and Sciences at the University of Northern Colorado in 1984. From 1984 to 1987 she was Dean of Plymouth State College in New Hampshire. She then served as 13th President of the University of Maine at Farmington from 1994 to 2012, and Interim President of the University of Southern Maine from 2012 to 2014. She was inducted into the Maine Women's Hall of Fame in 2002.

== Early life and education ==
Kalikow was born in Swampscott, Massachusetts. Her father, Irving Kalikow, a graduate of MIT, was an engineer; her mother was Rose (Cohen) Kalikow. She has one brother.

Kalikow graduated from Swampscott High School in 1958. She earned her A.B. in chemistry at Wellesley College in 1962. She went on to receive a master's degree in philosophy at the Massachusetts Institute of Technology in 1970, and a doctorate in philosophy at Boston University in 1974. She wrote her doctoral thesis on "Konrad Lorenz's Ethological Theory, 1927–1943".

== Academic career ==
In 1967 she taught philosophy at the University of Exeter in England. The following year she began teaching philosophy and the history of science at Southeastern Massachusetts University (now University of Massachusetts Dartmouth). She received tenure in 1974 and was made full professor in 1981. She also served as dean of the department of philosophy for three years, assistant to the president of the university for two years, and president of the faculty union for two years. In 1983 she worked in the president's office at Brown University as an American Council on Education Fellow.

In 1984 she moved to Greeley, Colorado, to become Dean of the College of Arts and Sciences at the University of Northern Colorado, a position she held for three years. In 1987 she crossed the country again to New Hampshire to serve as Dean of Plymouth State College, holding that position until 1994. From 1992 to 1993 she served a one-year term as interim president of the college. She was also a professor of philosophy. Her efforts to focus attention on women's issues led the college to establish the Theo Kalikow Award for faculty or staff members who work on behalf of women's issues.

== University president ==
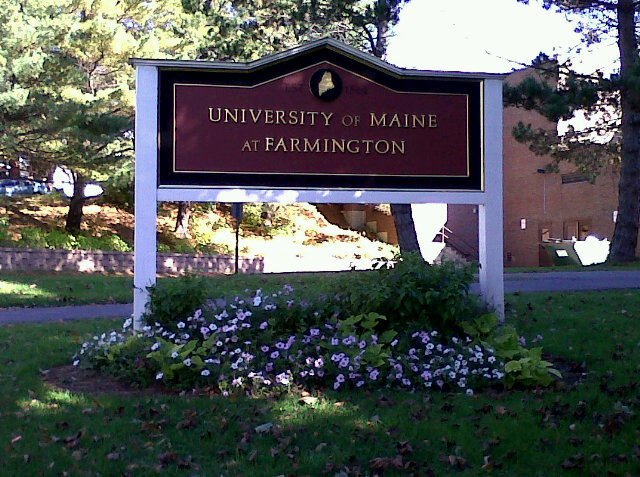
University of Maine at Farmington sign

In 1994 Kalikow was named the 13th President of the University of Maine at Farmington. She led several successful campaigns for the University, including a joint fundraising campaign for the on-campus Mantor Library and the Farmington Public Library and the establishment of the $5 million Emery Community Arts Center. She also established the women's studies program. She retired on June 30, 2012 after 18 years as president, being the longest-serving president in the four-year college's history.

In 2012, she was named Interim President of the University of Southern Maine. She assumed this position following the controversial departure of her predecessor, Dr. Selma Botman. Kalikow's term was marked by ongoing program and staff cuts in an effort to balance the budget, prompting numerous student protests. In July 2014, David Flanagan was named as her successor while the University searched for a permanent replacement, and Kalikow took on a one-year job as acting vice chancellor and president emerita, at the same salary she had received as president.

== Other activities ==
Kalikow is a co-founder of the Boston Society for Women in Philosophy and a founding member of Massachusetts Women in Higher Education. She is also the author of various papers, reviews, and publications concerning philosophy and the history of science, and has been a columnist for the Morning Sentinel since 2007. She is on the Board of Trustees at Breakwater School in Portland, Maine.

== Awards and honors ==
Kalikow is the recipient of the 2007 Green Building Leadership Award from the Maine chapter of the U.S. Green Building Council, the 2006 Deborah Morton Award from the University of New England, and the 2000 Maryann Hartman Award from the University of Maine Women's Studies Program. In 2002, she was inducted into the Maine Women's Hall of Fame.

In 1980, she received the Southern Massachusetts University Award for Contributions to the Status of Women. She was listed in the Who's Who of American Women, 1997–1998.

In September 2015, the University of Maine Board of Trustees renamed the Education Center on the Farmington campus as the Theodora J. Kalikow Education Center.

== Personal life ==
Kalikow has been open about her lesbian orientation since college. After a 20-year relationship with one partner, she now lives with Deb Pluck in Scarborough, Maine. Her hobbies include gardening and cross country skiing. In 2005 she won a bronze medal in triathlon in the Senior Olympics.
