= Gorham Co. v. White =

- Supreme Court of the United States

Argued April 24–25, 1872 Decided November 18, 1872
- Full case name: Gorham Company v. White
- Citations: 81 U.S. 511 (more) 14 Wall. 511; 20 L. Ed. 731; 1871 U.S. LEXIS 1018

Holding
- It is not essential to identity of design that the appearance should be the same to the eye of an expert. If, to an ordinary observer, the resemblance is sufficiently deceptive as to induce him to purchase one, supposing it to be the other, then the one first patented is infringed by the other.

Court membership
- Chief Justice Salmon P. Chase Associate Justices Samuel Nelson · Nathan Clifford; Noah H. Swayne · Samuel F. Miller; David Davis · Stephen J. Field; William Strong · Joseph P. Bradley

Gorham Co. v. White, 81 U.S. (14 Wall.) 511 (1872), was a United States Supreme Court case that established the "ordinary observer" test for design patent infringement. The Court held that infringement occurs when two designs are sufficiently similar that an ordinary purchaser would mistake one for the other, even if an expert could distinguish between them. Applying that test, it ruled that the designs sold by White infringed Gorham's patent.

== Background ==
In July 1861, Gorham & Co. obtained a design patent for the "cottage pattern", a design for tablespoon and fork handles. The patent was later transferred to the Gorham Manufacturing Company. The company sued George C. White, a sales agent for Rogers & Bros., alleging that the spoons and forks he sold bearing two designs patented in 1867 and 1868 infringed its patent.

The United States Circuit Court for the Southern District of New York dismissed the suit, finding no infringement. It compared the designs from the perspective of someone experienced in the trade who examined them side by side, rather than that of an ordinary purchaser. Gorham appealed to the Supreme Court.

== Decision ==
In an opinion by Justice William Strong, the Supreme Court held that both of White's designs infringed Gorham's patent. Although there were differences in ornamentation, the Court found that the designs were sufficiently similar in overall appearance to mislead ordinary purchasers. The Court reversed the lower court's decree and remanded the case with instructions to enter a decree consistent with its opinion. Justices Samuel F. Miller, Stephen J. Field, and Joseph P. Bradley dissented.

== Significance ==
The decision established the "ordinary observer" test for determining infringement of a design patent. Under this standard, infringement is assessed from the perspective of an ordinary purchaser rather than an expert in the relevant field. The test has remained a central feature of American design patent law, although its interpretation and application have evolved through later judicial decisions.
