= Academy Building (University of Southern Maine) =

Building in Gorham, Maine

- U.S. National Register of Historic Places
- U.S. Historic district – Contributing property
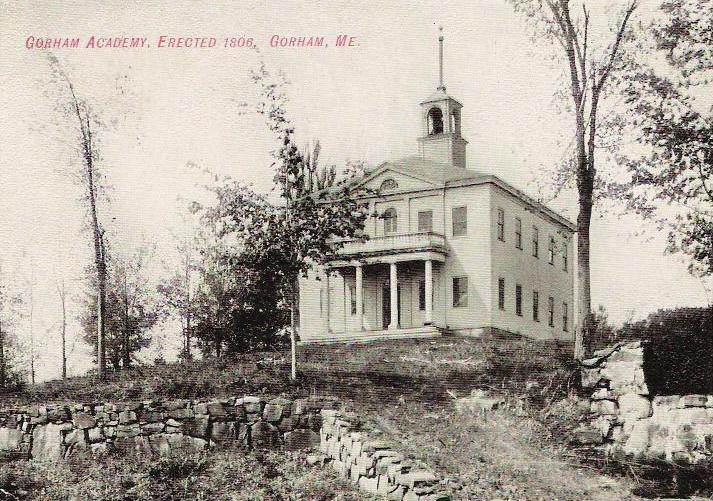

- Location within Maine Location within the United States
- Location: Gorham campus of the University of Southern Maine, Gorham, Maine
- Coordinates: 43°40′55″N 70°26′45″W
- Area: less than one acre
- Built: 1806
- Architect: Samuel Elder
- Architectural style: Federal
- Part of: Gorham Campus Historic District (ID78000171)
- NRHP reference No.: 73000111

Significant dates
- Added to NRHP: January 18, 1973
- Designated CP: May 5, 1978

The Academy Building (Gorham Academy or Gorham Seminary) is an historic building located on the campus of the University of Southern Maine (USM) in Gorham, Maine, United States. Built in 1806 to house the Gorham Academy, it was listed on the National Register of Historic Places in 1973 for its fine Federal period architecture and its importance in local education.

== Description and history ==
The Academy Building is set on the east side of the USM campus, between University Way and School Street (Maine State Route 114), a short way northwest of the Gorham town center. The campus is set on a hill, and the building's site gives it a commanding view down toward School Street and the town. It is a two-story wood-frame structure, about 40 by 50 feet (12 m × 15 m), and is topped by a gable-on-hip roof with a square wooden cupola at it center. The cupola has arched openings showing an open belfry, and is topped by a wooden spire. The building's walls are finished in wooden clapboards, and it rests on a granite foundation. The corners are finished with wooden quoining, and a modillioned cornice extends around all four sides. The main facade faces northeast, and has a detailed Classical style, with a projecting portico supported by four Doric columns and topped by a balustrade.

Gorham Academy was established by an act of the state legislature in 1803, as a college preparatory school, and was the seventh to be established in what is now the state of Maine. This building was built by Samuel Elder and completed in 1806. Initially schooling only boys, it underwent several changes, sometimes serving both boys and girls, and sometimes only girls or boys. In its last incarnation, established in 1856 as the Gorham Seminary, it was coeducational. This school closed in 1877. In 1878, the building was sold to the state to be used for the normal college built around it, which became the university. Though on USM's campus, it is not owned by the university; it is the property of Gorham Academy Association.

== See also ==
- National Register of Historic Places listings in Cumberland County, Maine
