= Richard Pattenaude =

Richard L. Pattenaude (born c. 1946) is an American political scientist and academic administrator. He is president of Ashford University and has served as president of the University of Southern Maine and Chancellor of the University of Maine System.

Pattenaude was born in Seattle. He holds a B.A. in economics from San Jose State University. In 1968, while he was enrolled as a graduate student in economics at the University of Colorado Boulder, he was drafted into military service. He served in the U.S. Army in Vietnam. Upon his return to civilian life in 1971, he changed his major to political science and completed a Ph.D. in that field at the University of Colorado in 1974.

After earning his Ph.D., Pattenaude joined the political science faculty of Drake University, where he served five years on the faculty and as an associate dean. He then went to the Binghamton University, where he was associate vice president for academic affairs for five years. He left Binghamton for Central Connecticut State University, where he was vice president for academic affairs for five years. He then became president of the University of Southern Maine, serving in that position for 16 years ending in 2007.

Pattenaude became University of Maine System chancellor on July 1, 2007. He retired from that post in 2012 and was replaced by James H. Page. In October 2012, Bridgepoint Education announced that Pattenaude had been appointed president of Ashford University, with the intention of serving until August 2015.
