= Gorham Academy =

Coordinates: 43°40′55″N 70°26′45″W

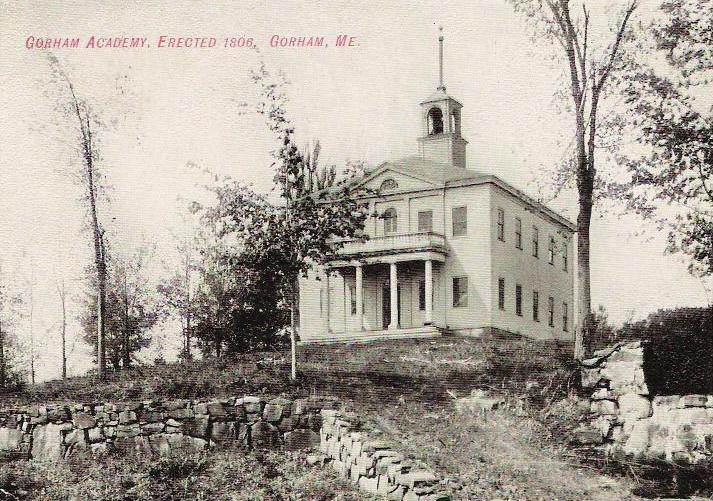
Gorham Academy Building, 1906

Gorham Academy was a preparatory school for boys and girls in Gorham, Maine.

== Origins ==
In 1802, Hon. Stephen Longfellow presented a petition in favor of an academy in Gorham to the Massachusetts State Legislature. Governor Caleb Strong approved an act incorporating the Academy on March 5, 1803. The academy was to be for education of both sexes. The first meeting of the Board of Trustees was on June 1 of the same year, and on the 23rd of June, the legislature granted a half-township of land to the academy.

In September 1806, work on the Federal style Academy Building, designed by Samuel Elder, was completed. Reuben Nason was inaugurated as the first preceptor, and 45 boys were admitted. 15 girls were admitted in the following year, and the total number of students was raised to 75.

== Closing ==
The academy was incorporated into the Gorham Normal School in the late 1870s, and the Academy Building is now on the campus of the University of Southern Maine, the successor institution of the Gorham Normal School. In 1973, it was listed on the National Register of Historic Places for its fine Federal period architecture and its importance in local education.

== List of Preceptors ==
- Reuben Nason, 1806-1810
- Dr. Charles Coffin, 1810-1811
- Asa Reddington, Jr., 1811-?
- William White, ?-1815
- Reuben Nason, 1815-1834
- John V. Beane, 1834-?
- Rev. Amos Brown, ?-1847
- Edward P. Weston, 1847-1860
- Josiah B. Webb, 1861-?

== See also ==
- Education in Maine
