= University of Southern Maine =

Public university in Portland, Gorham and Lewiston, Maine, U.S.

- Former name: List: Western State Normal School (1878–1879); Gorham Normal School (1879–1945); Portland University (1921–1925; 1945–1961); Portland Junior College (1933–1957); Gorham State Teachers College (1945–1965); University of Maine in Portland (1957–1970); Gorham State College (1965–1970); University of Maine at Portland-Gorham (1970–1978)
- Motto: Gaudium Visque Discendi
- Motto in English: "The joy and power of learning"
- Type: Public university
- Established: 1878; 148 years ago
- Parent institution: University of Maine System
- Academic affiliations: CUMU; space-grant
- President: Jacqueline Edmondson
- Students: 6,257 (fall 2024)
- Undergraduates: 4,455 (fall 2024)
- Postgraduates: 1,802 (fall 2024)
- Location: Gorham, Maine, United States; 43°39′45″N 70°16′34″W
- Campus: 142 acres (57 ha); Urban, suburban
- Newspaper: The Free Press
- Colors: Royal blue and gold
- Nickname: Huskies
- Sporting affiliations: NCAA Division III
- Mascot: Champ the Husky
- Website: usm.maine.edu/

The University of Southern Maine (USM) is a public university with campuses in Gorham and Portland, Maine, United States. It is the second largest and southernmost university in the University of Maine System. It was founded as two separate state universities, Western State Normal School and Portland University. The two universities, later known as Gorham State College and the University of Maine in Portland, were combined in 1970 to help streamline the public university system in Maine and eventually expanded by adding the Lewiston campus in 1988.

The Portland Campus is home to the Edmund Muskie School of Public Service, the Bio Sciences Research Institute, the Osher Lifelong Learning Institute, the Osher Map Library, and the USM School of Business. The Gorham campus, much more residential, is home to the School of Education and Human Development and the Osher School of Music.

== History ==
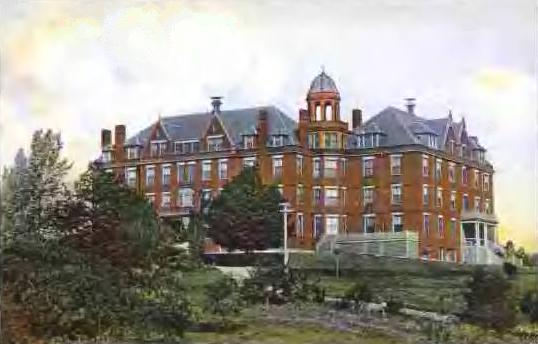
Robie Andrews Hall is one of the original Gorham State College buildings. It is now primarily a residence hall with some mixed academic usage on the first floor. Taken from a 1907 postcard.

Evolving from Gorham Academy into an institution of higher education, USM originated in 1878 as Gorham Normal School, later called Gorham State Teachers College and then Gorham State College. In 1970 that institution merged with the University of Maine at Portland (previously Portland Junior College) and became the University of Maine at Portland-Gorham. The name was changed to University of Southern Maine in 1978. The Lewiston-Auburn campus was founded in 1988.

=== Leadership ===
William J. MacLeod served as president from 1970 until 1971. Louis J.P. Calisti served as president from 1971 until 1973. Walter P. Fridinger served as president in 1973. N. Edd Miller served as president from 1973 until 1978. Kenneth W. Allen served as president from 1978 until 1979. Robert L. Woodbury served as president from 1979 until 1986. Patricia R. Plante served as president from 1987 to 1991. Richard Pattenaude served as president from 1991 until 2007. Joe Wood served as interim president from 2007 to 2008. Selma Botman served as president from 2008 until 2012, when she suffered a faculty no-confidence vote. Theodora J. Kalikow served as interim president from 2012 until 2014. Former power company CEO David Flanagan served as interim president from 2014 until 2015. Glenn Cummings, former speaker of the Maine House, served as president from 2015 until 2022. Jacqueline Edmondson became the 14th president of the University of Southern Maine in July 2022.

== Campuses ==
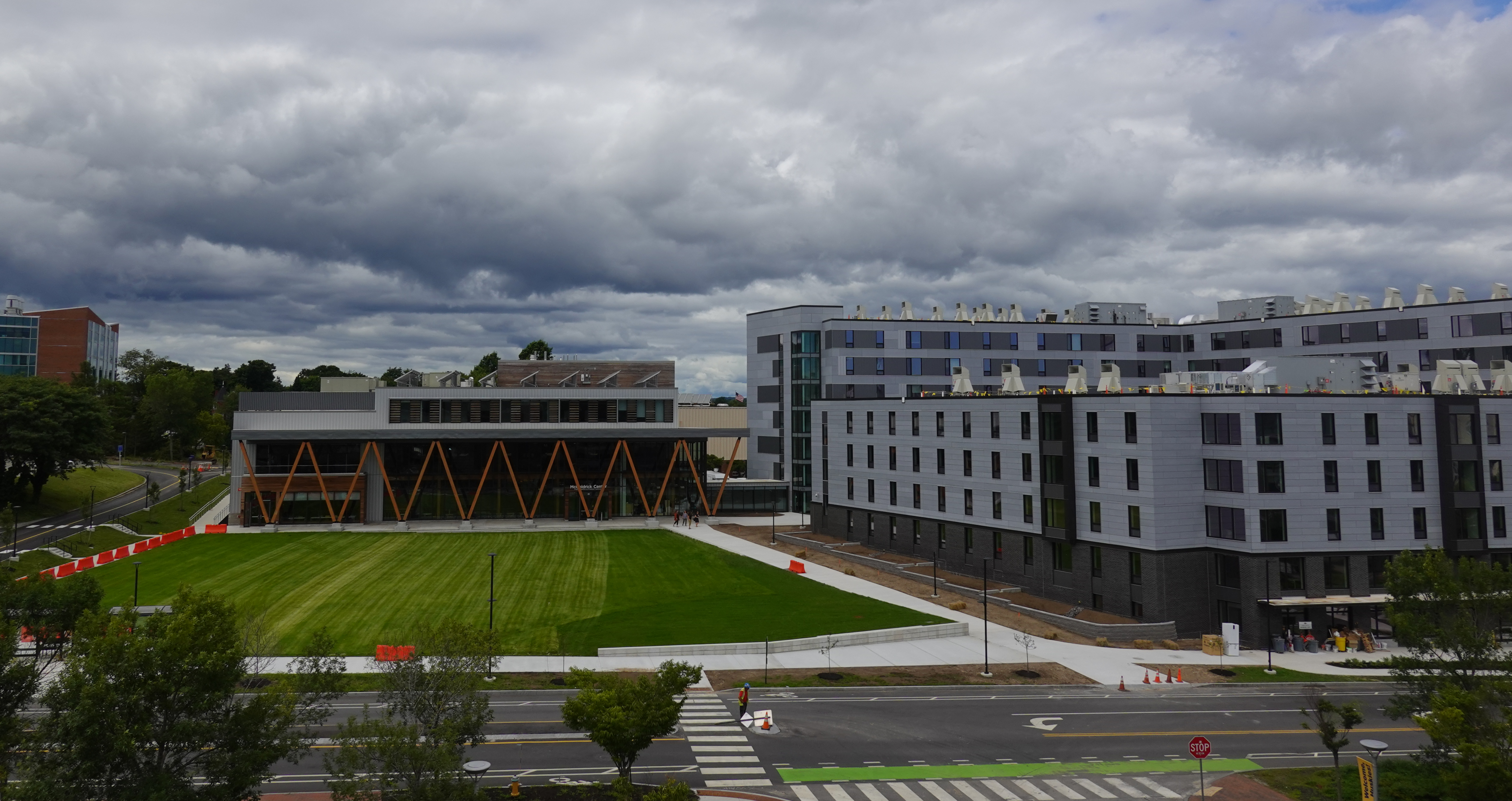
The McGoldrick Center for Career & Student Services, left, the Bean Green, and the Portland Commons dorm

Luther Bonney, Masterton Hall, and the Science building at USM's Portland Campus in 2007

=== Portland ===
The Portland campus is located in the Oakdale neighborhood. The primary academic areas at the Portland campus are business, nursing, history, political science, economics, sociology, biology, physics, chemistry, math, english, psychology, media studies, modern and classical languages and literatures, and American and New England studies. The campus houses the Wishcamper Center, the Osher Map Library and Smith Center for Cartographic Education, Hannaford Hall, Luther Bonney Hall, Masterton Hall, the Science Building, the Southworth Planetarium, Payson Smith Hall, Abromson Community Education Center, the Alumni House, and the Sullivan Gymnasium complex. Many department offices are located around the perimeter of the campus center in converted multi-story homes as well as in the major buildings.

In 2021, the university removed the Woodbury Campus Center and broke ground on the 210,000 square foot, 580-bed Portland Commons dorm, which opened in August 2023. It has 385 studios, single, double and four-person apartments with views of the city and Casco Bay. The dorm is open to USM upperclassmen, USM graduate students, University of Maine School of Law students and Southern Maine Community College upperclassmen.

The McGoldrick Center for Career & Student Success and the adjacent Bean Green grassy quad also opened to students in August 2023. The McGoldrick Center includes a dining hall, a career center, and multiple student lounges. Across the street from the dorm is a 500-space parking garage, which is the largest Level Two charging station in Maine, with 58 electric vehicle charging stations and storage for more than 250 bicycles. The buildings were built with green building techniques. Portland Commons is the second largest passive house building at an American university.

In 2023, the university broke ground on the $63 million Crewe Center for the Arts with an art gallery, a visual arts teaching space, and a performing arts center able to seat 210 people. It is located between Payson Smith and Luther Bonney.

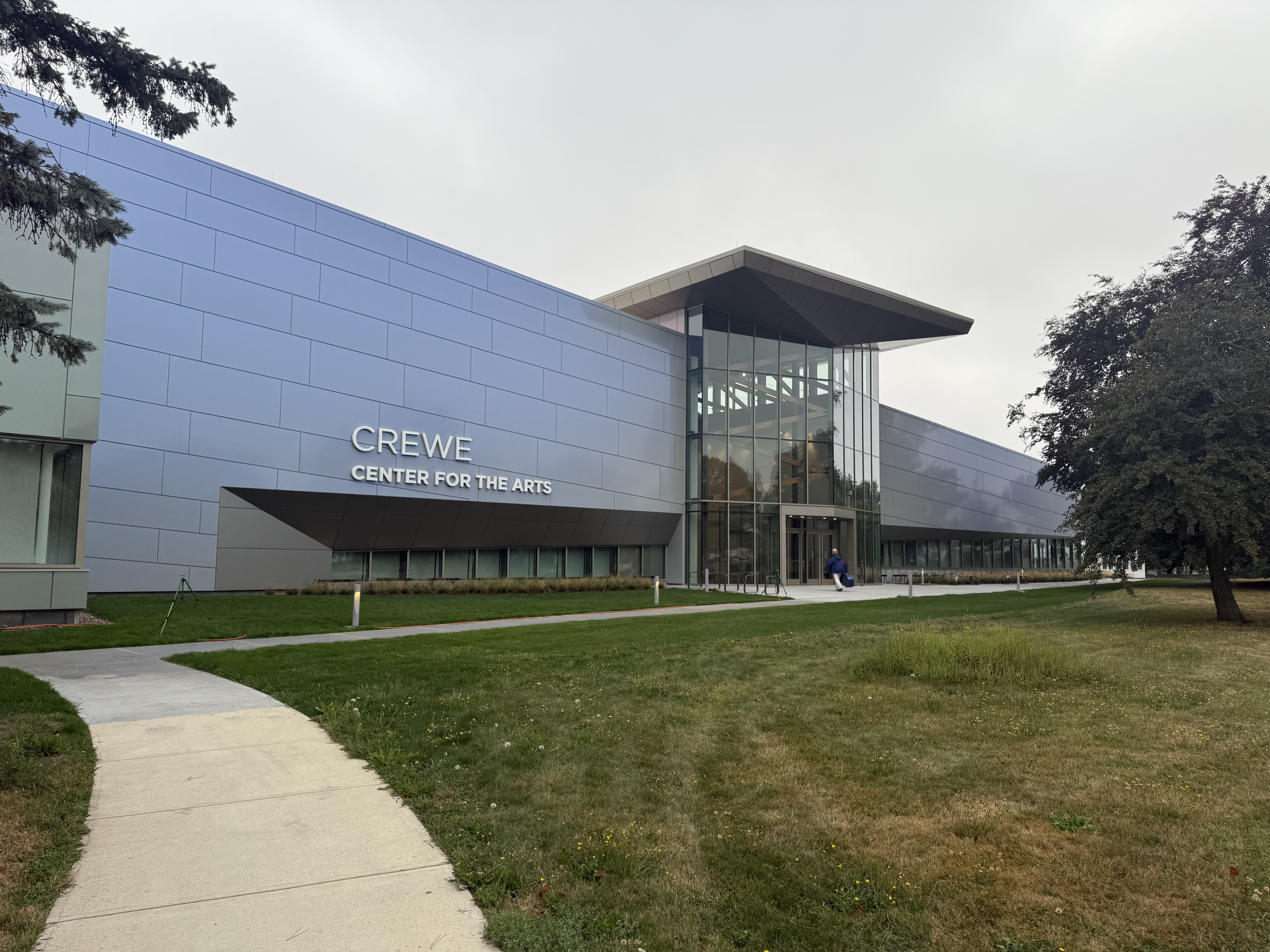
New music school building at USM

The student-run community radio station WMPG and the student-run newspaper The Free Press are located on the Portland campus.

The campus is adjacent to Noyes Park, a three-quarter acre landscaped park with large shade trees, and near Fesenden Park, Baxter Boulevard park, and Deering Oaks. The USM Portland campus is bordered by I-295, with on and off-ramps accessing the campus on Forest Avenue, and is across the street from a Hannaford grocery store and near restaurants and bars, which include The Great Lost Bear.

==== Glickman Library ====
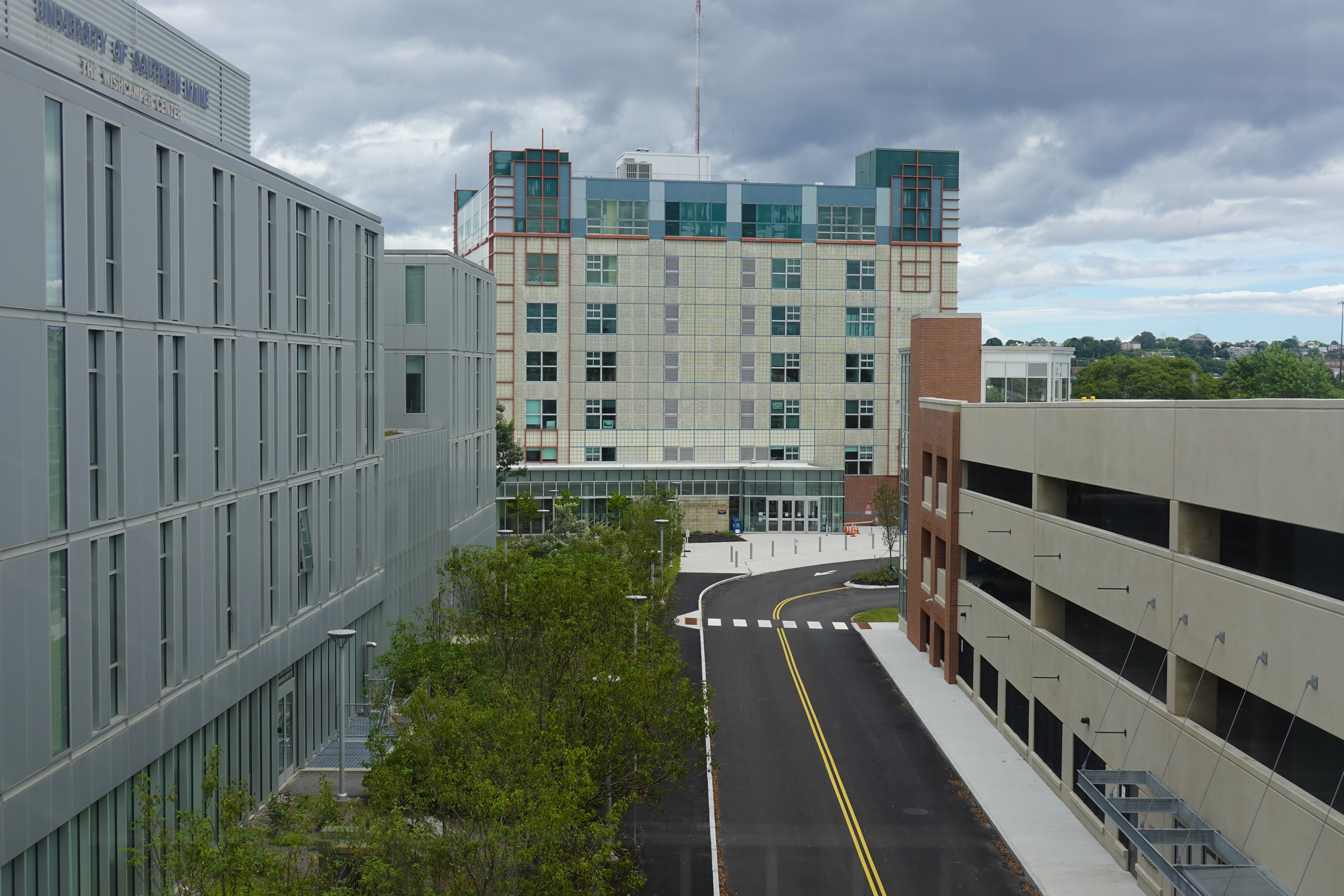
USM Glickman Library at Portland

The Albert Brenner Glickman Family Library is the main library, located on the Portland campus. It includes the Osher Map Library. It houses the Jean Byers Sampson Center for Diversity in Maine, where the current collections represent the African American, Jewish, and Lesbian, Gay, Bisexual, and Transgender communities. The library also has rare book collections, including holdings in pre-20th century New England textbooks.

=== Gorham ===
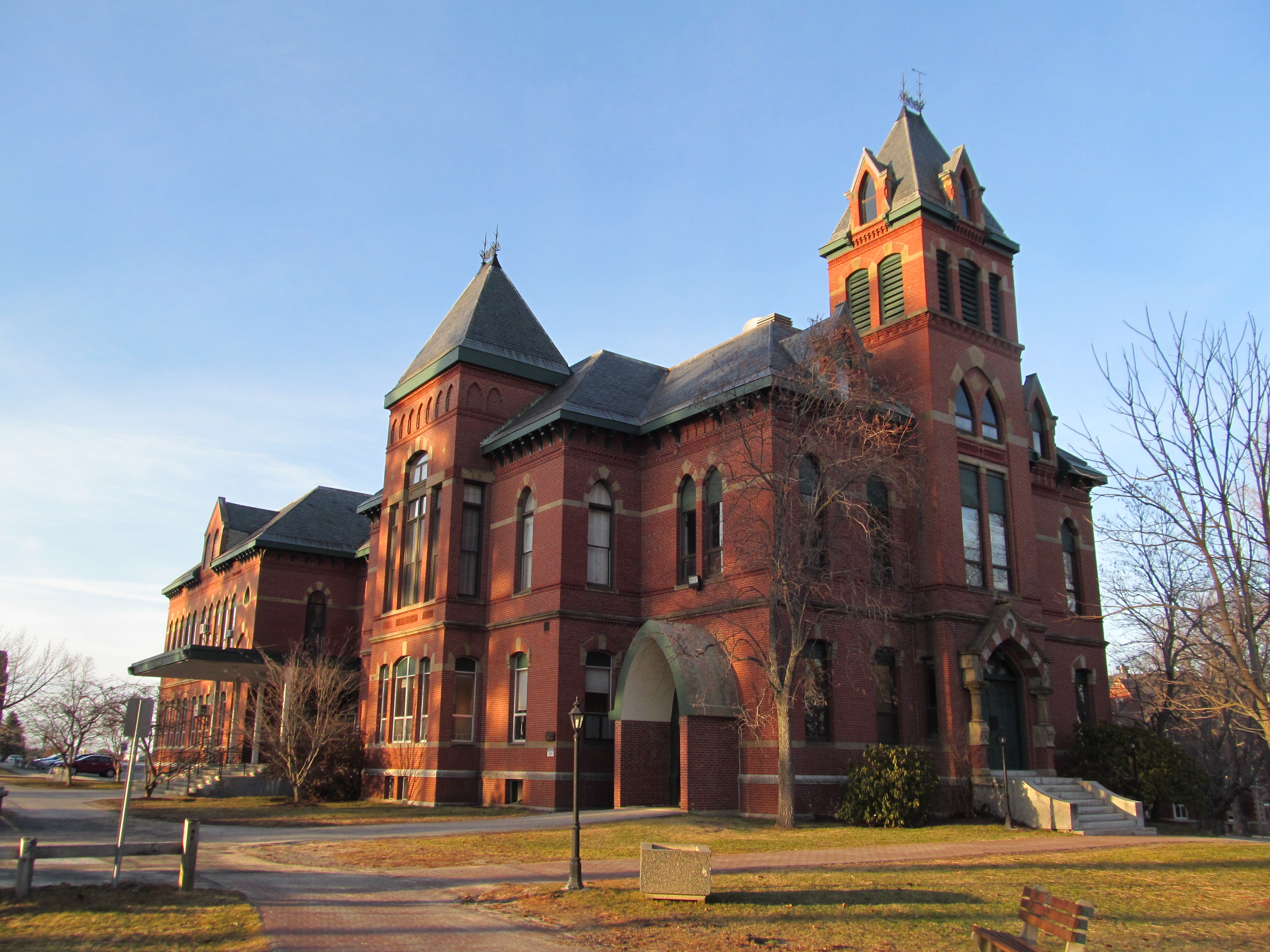
Corthell Hall is located on the Gorham campus and is the home of the Dr. Alfred and D. Suzi Osher School of Music, which houses Corthell Concert Hall. Originally Corthell Hall was the sole classroom building on the Gorham Normal School campus.

Gorham is home to most of the university's dormitories and competitive athletic facilities. The primary academic areas residing in Gorham are industrial technologies, engineering, art, music, theater, counseling and education, anthropology, geography, environmental sciences, and geosciences. McLellan House, built in 1773, was acquired by Gorham State College in 1966. It was converted into dormitories and later into office space. The Academy Building was built in 1803 and purchased by the university in 1878.

Residence Halls located on the Gorham campus include:

- Woodward Hall
- Dickey and Wood Towers: Dickey and Wood Towers are twin, circular towers that were opened in 1970 and formerly inaugurated in 1973. They can house 380 students. They are named after Edna Dickey, who taught history at the university from 1945–1972 as well as serving as Dean of Women from 1945–69 and Esther Wood, who taught social sciences from 1930–1973. USM proposed mothballing the two towers to save $400,000 in 2014. The dorms were closed in 2015. In 2023, Portland Emergency Shelter Assessment Committee asked about using the empty dorms as temporary shelters for asylum seekers and other unhoused people. The university said the buildings need $40 million in asbestos abatement and rehabilitation. The university plans to demolish the dorms.
- Upton Hall and Hastings Hall: Upton Hall and the adjacent Hastings Hall are named after Ethelyn Upton and Mary Hastings, both of whom were prominent faculty. Upton Hall, home of the university health center and Residential Life Office, was opened in 1960. Hastings Hall opened in 1968. Together, the complex can house up to 300 students.
- Anderson Hall
- Robie Andrews Hall: Robie Hall is named after former Maine Governor Frederick Robie, who served from 1883 to 1887. It was built in 1897 to replace a female-only dormitory which burned down in 1894.
- Phillipi Hall: Opened in 2001. Philippi hall also houses USM's new Pioneer Program.
- Upperclass Hall (completed fall of 2007)

=== Lewiston-Auburn ===
USM's Lewiston-Auburn campus, Front entrance. This campus was established in 1988.

The Lewiston-Auburn campus of the University of Southern Maine is the newest of the three campuses. The college on this campus is known as Lewiston-Auburn College (USM LAC).

== Academics ==
Undergraduate demographics as of Fall 2023
Race and ethnicity	Total
White	76%
Black	8%
Hispanic	5%
Two or more races	4%
Asian	3%
International student	2%
Unknown	2%
American Indian/Alaska Native	1%
Economic diversity
Low-income (Note: The percentage of students who received an income-based federal Pell grant intended for low-income students.)	35%
Affluent (Note: The percentage of students who are a part of the American middle class at the bare minimum.)	65%

USM offers baccalaureate and master's degree programs as well as doctoral programs in Public Policy and School Psychology. Undergraduate study is available in roughly 115 areas, and degrees conferred include the B.S, B.A, B.M., and B.F.A. Graduate study is available at the Masters and Doctoral level through the School of Business, School of Education and Human Development, Muskie School of Public Service, School of Social Work, School of Music, School of Engineering and Physical Sciences, School of Nursing, and the School of Environmental, Health, and Life Sciences.

The Department of Educational and School Psychology offers a master's degree and a doctoral degree in School Psychology. The degrees are accredited by the Maine Department of Education. Graduates of the master's program are eligible for certification as school psychologists. Graduates of the doctoral program are eligible for state licensure as psychologists and certification as school psychologists. The department also offers a master's degree with an emphasis in applied behavior analysis that meets the educational requirements to be eligible for board certification as a behavior analyst (BCBA).

The Stonecoast MFA Program in Creative Writing is a graduate program in creative writing which enrolls approximately 100 students in four major genres: creative nonfiction, fiction, poetry, and popular fiction.

The USM School of Business is accredited by the Association to Advance Collegiate Schools of Business (AACSB).

Continuing education is available through the Osher Lifelong Learning Institutes.

The University of Southern Maine is one of two schools in the state of Maine that offers an ABET accredited Computer Science degree program.

Students at the two-year Southern Maine Community College in South Portland can transfer their credit hours to continue their degrees in business administration; pre-engineering, fire science, horticulture, liberal studies with a focus in science, marine science, nursing, precision machining and manufacturing, and respiratory therapy.

=== Maine-Greenland Collaboration ===
The Maine-Greenland Collaboration is an interdisciplinary research project to investigate the environmental, socioeconomic, and cultural challenges facing coastal communities in Maine and Greenland. The collaboration involves researchers and students from the Muskie School of Public Service, the School of Social Work and many other programs.

=== Reykjavik University Partnership ===
USM has a partnership with Reykjavik University allowing for more student and faculty exchanges between USM and Reykjavik University. The partnership was signed in 2017.

=== Maine Teacher Residency Program ===
The University of Southern Maine administers the Maine Teacher Residency Program for the University of Maine System. The program allows teaching students to work in Maine classrooms while completing their degrees and aims to ease the shortage of teachers. In the 2022–2023 school year, 40 teaching students were enrolled in the program. The program will grow to include 70 more student teachers in the 2023–2024 school year.

=== Edmund Muskie School of Public Service & the Catherine Cutler Institute ===
The Muskie School is located on the Portland campus and includes public health, tourism and hospitality, geography-anthropology, and the graduate school of policy, planning, and management. The Catherine Cutler Institute is the research arm of the Muskie School.

=== Quality Control Collaboratory ===
The Quality Control Collaboratory (QC2) is a partnership with the Maine Brewers' Guild to provide laboratory analysis and testing for the craft beverage industry. It is located on the Portland campus. The lab provides research opportunities for USM undergrad and graduate students.

=== Boyne Family Advanced Simulation and Interprofessional Education Center ===
The Boyne Family Advanced Simulation and Interprofessional Education Center is a $2.5 million simulation laboratory for nursing students located on two floors of the Science Building.

=== Maine Regulatory Training & Ethics Center ===
The Maine Regulatory Training & Ethics Center is located in the Wishcamper Center and provides training in regulatory compliance, workforce development, and ethical decision-making. It is a partnership between the University of Southern Maine, the University of Maine Law School, businesses, and community partners. In 2023, the National Science Foundation provided $400,000 in funding to the center to develop an ethics training program for scientists working with AI.

=== Charles Scontras Center for Labor and Community Education ===
The Charles Scontras Center for Labor and Community Education is located in Payson Hall and formally opens in Fall 2023. Matthew Emmick is the director. The center educates workers about labor laws and their rights.

== International collaboration ==
The university is an active member of the University of the Arctic. UArctic is an international cooperative network based in the Circumpolar Arctic region, consisting of more than 200 universities, colleges, and other organizations with an interest in promoting education and research in the Arctic region.

The university also participates in UArctic's mobility program north2north. The aim of that program is to enable students of member institutions to study in different parts of the North.

== Enrollment ==
The University of Southern Maine is the second largest university in the University of Maine System. After declining since 2019, enrollment was projected to increase by 2% in the 2024–2025 year. Enrollment for 2023–2024 was 5,407 students. In 2022, 58.8% of undergraduate students were female and 41.2% were male. As of 2021, USM had 5,950 undergraduate students and 1,750 graduate students, with a student-faculty ratio of 13:3.

== Student life ==
=== Dining service ===
Sodexo operates the dining halls. In the fall of 2022, Sodexo introduced delivery robots that carry food to students on both the Gorham and the Portland campuses. The robots are called Kiwibots and have special tires to work in the snow. Students must download an app to use the service. The robots can deliver Starbucks lattes and falafel from food trucks parked on campus.

The Brooks Dining Hall on the Gorham campus was renovated in 2019 at a cost of $2.5 million allowing it to expand the vegetarian, vegan, and gluten-free food. In 2023, the McGoldrick Center opened on the Portland campus. It houses a 300-seat dining hall and the Husky Cafe & Brew Pub.

=== The Free Press ===
The Free Press is a student-run and funded campus newspaper that was founded in 1972. It publishes a print edition weekly during the academic year, equaling roughly 22 editions a year. The newspaper has a circulation of 3,000. It is an entirely student-run and student-funded newspaper not supported by an academic department. The university does not have a journalism program. In fall 2022, a lack of staff led the newspaper to discontinue updates to its websites and social media and focus on print publications.

=== WMPG ===
WMPG is a community radio station located on the Portland Campus. A mix of USM students and volunteers from the greater Portland community produce all the music and local public affairs programs. It began broadcasting in 1973.

=== Husky Line ===
The Greater Portland METRO bus service runs the Husky Line between the Portland and Gorham campuses. The bus arrives every 30 minutes on weekdays. The public bus line was added in 2018, replacing a previous private bus service. The route is a limited-stop line operated by buses running on natural gas. All the buses have wifi. All USM students and faculty ride the bus for free by showing their campus ID card.

== Athletics ==
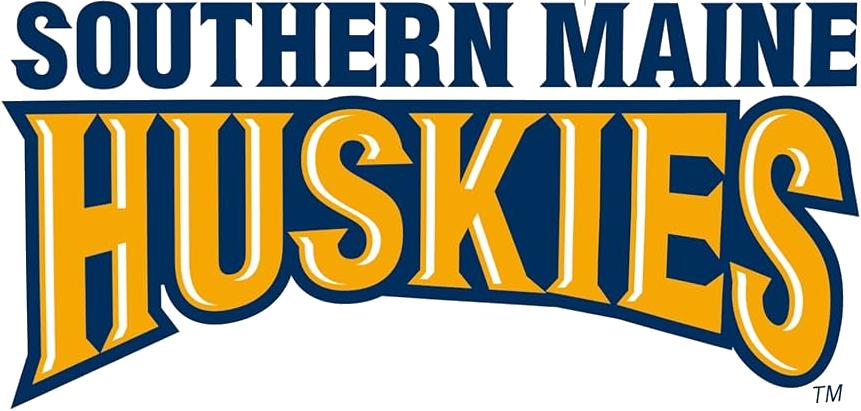
Southern Maine Huskies wordmark

The University of Southern Maine teams are the Huskies.

The athletic program started in 1922 with men’s and women's basketball. The university sponsors 23 sports at the NCAA Division III level. The majority of sports compete in the Little East Conference; wrestling competes as an independent Division III team, men's and women's ice hockey compete in the ECAC East.

=== Varsity teams ===
Men's sports	Women's sports
Baseball	Basketball
Basketball	Cross country
Cross country	Field hockey
Golf	Golf
Ice hockey	Ice hockey
Lacrosse	Lacrosse
Soccer	Soccer
Tennis	Softball
Track and field^{1}	Tennis
Wrestling	Track and field^{1}
	Volleyball
^{1} – includes both indoor and outdoor

=== Club sports ===
The University of Southern Maine has six club sports teams. They include ice hockey, men's rugby, men's volleyball, women's volleyball, dance team, and esports. The largest club is the USM Esports team, a competitive video gaming team, with 170 participating students during the 2023–2024 academic year. In 2024, Town & Country Federal Credit Union donated $750,000 to create The Collab: Esports Arena within the Brooks Student Center on the Gorham campus.

== Controversy ==
=== Parking Revenue Recovery Services ===
In 2023–2024, USM instituted a new parking policy and hired controversial Colorado-based vendor Parking Revenue Recovery Services to administer it. Students reported that the system was prone to errors, it issued tickets to cars doing drop offs, and the company was difficult to communicate with. Some students had parking ticket bills totaling thousands of dollars. Parking tickets issued for $55 for each violation. Both students and community members have complained that the system is difficult to use.

=== Dining service ===
In 2019, students complained about the dining services. Sodexo operates University of Southern Maine's dining halls. It was reported that the "students who prefer a plant-based diet were ditching the meal plan, eating elsewhere or foregoing meals." In response, the university renovated the Gorham dining hall. The complaints continued. In the spring of 2022, students reported dissatisfaction with the food served by the dining hall, complaining of undercooked meat, overcooked pasta, and a lack of vegetarian options.

=== 2014 financial problems ===
At the beginning of 2014, administrators at USM announced that the university had found itself in dire financial straits, and would be announcing program closures and faculty layoffs, including long-term just cause faculty and tenured faculty. President Theodora Kalikow and Provost Michael Stevenson announced that four departments would be closed: the Recreation and Leisure Studies Department, the GeoSciences Department, the Arts and Humanities program at Lewiston-Auburn College, and the graduate program American and New England Studies (the Recreation and Leisure Studies closure was later rescinded). A week later, twelve individual faculty members in various departments were informed that they would be laid off effective May 31. As a result of protests led by USM students, the layoffs were rescinded by Kalikow. Later that year, Chancellor Page asked Kalikow for her resignation as USM president.

This process was restarted in October 2014, when interim President David T. Flanagan (former CEO of a power company) and Provost Joseph McDonnell announced that the three programs targeted for elimination in March would indeed be eliminated, and two more: French and Applied Medical Sciences. In addition, USM faculty were notified that twenty-five departments would have to shed fifty full-time faculty members, whether through retirement or layoffs. In the end, 36 faculty members retired, but since some of them were not in targeted departments, 25 faculty members were fired.

Local business leaders claimed the cuts would impair Maine's economy and many faculty, students, staff, and community members disputed administration claims about financial insolvency. Critics claimed that the layoffs were arbitrary and capricious, an attempt to eliminate outspoken faculty critical of administration policies and actions, and in violation of the Faculty Senate governance document and the faculty union's Collective Bargaining Agreement. All of the faculty layoffs were immediately challenged through grievances filed by the union against the University of Maine System. Following an investigation, the American Association of University Professors (AAUP) voted in 2015 to censure the university.

In 2024, the budget was expected to close with a surplus, the first time since 2019. The university expected to see a 2% enrollment increase in the fall.

== Notable alumni ==
Name	Class	Notability	Reference
Poppy Arford	1981	Maine state legislator	
Rick Bennett	2000	Chairman of the Maine Republican Party	
Joseph Bruno	1989	Minority leader of the Maine House of Representatives, 2000–2004	
Alan Casavant	2004	Mayor of Biddeford, Maine, 2012–present	
Kate Chappell	1983	Founder of Tom's of Maine	
Kathleen Chase	1991	Maine state representative from the 147th district	
John Cleveland	1982	State senator from Maine's 15th District	
John Currier	1975	28th vice commandant of the United States Coast Guard	
Don Dodge	1977	Developer advocate for Google	
Benjamin F. Dudley	1999	Maine House of Representatives, 1998–2006	
Michael Dumont	1984	Retired flag officer, naval aviator and vice admiral in the United States Navy	
Eleanor Espling	1994	Maine House of Representatives, 2010–2018	
Neil Genzlinger	1977	Playwright, editor, book reviewer, and theatre and television critic who frequently writes for The New York Times	
Randall Greenwood	2012	Maine House of Representatives	
Dorothy Hogg	1981	Retired lieutenant general of the United States Air Force, twenty-third Surgeon General of the United States Air Force, and the first Surgeon General of the United States Space Force	
Hannah Holmes	1988	Journalist	
Rebecca Jauch	2003	Maine state legislator	
Ken Joyce	1990	Baseball coach and manager	
Margaret D. Klein	1999	Retired rear admiral in the United States Navy; dean of Leadership and Ethics for the Naval War College	
Lois Lowry	1973	Writer	
Kim Moody	1977	Distance runner	
Luke Robinson	2008	Professional wrestler	
Kristina Sabasteanski	2012	Retired biathlete who has competed in two Olympics	
Heather Sanborn	2004	attorney, businesswoman, Maine Public Advocate, member of the Maine Senate	
Theresa Secord	1981	Native American (Penobscot) artist, basketmaker, geologist and activist from Maine	
Tony Shalhoub	1977	Actor	
Thomas F. Spencer	1987	US Army major general	
Raymond C. Stevens	1986	Chemist and structural biologist; founder, CEO and board member of Structure Therapeutics	
John Bruce Wallace	1979	Composer and guitarist	
