= Union Church =

Union Church may refer to:

== Churches ==
=== United States ===
(by state then city)

- Union Church and School (Paris, Arkansas)
- Union Church of Dunnigan, California
- Sterling Union Pacific Railroad Depot, Sterling, Colorado, listed on the NRHP in Colorado
- Union Church/St. Paul's Church, Riverton, Connecticut
- Jensen Union Church, Jensen Beach, Florida, now Jensen Beach Christian Church
- Makawao Union Church, Paia, Hawaii
- Union Church (Oreana, Illinois)
- Old Union Church and Cemetery (Alfordsville, Indiana), listed on the NRHP in Indiana
- Union Church (Davis City, Iowa)
- Union Church (Sibley, Louisiana)
- Union Church (Buckfield, Maine)
- Union Church (Columbia Falls, Maine)
- Union Church (Durham, Maine)
- Columbia Union Church, Epping, Maine
- Jonesboro Union Church, Jonesboro, Maine
- Union Church (Naples, Maine)
- Union Church (North Harpswell, Maine)
- Union Church of Northeast Harbor, Maine
- Union Church (Phillips, Maine)
- Union Church (Round Pond, Maine)
- Stetson Union Church, Stetson, Maine
- Union Church of Vinalhaven, Maine
- Union Church (Wiscasset, Maine), determined to be the smallest church in the world from 1958 until 1990
- South Swansea Union Church, now South Swansea Baptist Church, Swansea, Massachusetts, listed on the NRHP
- Greenwood Union Church, Wakefield, Massachusetts
- South Berrien Center Union Church and Cemetery, Berrien, Michigan
- Sherman City Union Church, Sherman City, Michigan
- People's Union Church, Scambler Township, Minnesota
- Union Church Presbyterian Church (Union Church, Mississippi), listed on the NRHP in Mississippi
- Northfield Union Church, Northfield, New Hampshire
- Union Church (South Wolfeboro, New Hampshire)
- Stark Union Church, Stark, New Hampshire
- First Union Protestant Church of Mountain View, Bellmont, New York
- Foothills Baptist Church (Essex, New York), formerly known as Union Church at Boquet Chapel
- Hamilton Union Church Rectory, Guilderland, New York
- Union Church of Pocantico Hills, Pocantico Hills, New York
- Stone Mills Union Church, Stone Mills, New York
- Grace Union Church and Cemetery, Blackburn, North Carolina
- Salem Union Church and Cemetery, Maiden, North Carolina
- Berea Union Depot, Berea, Ohio
- Union Church (Kipton, Ohio)
- Bellman's Union Church, Centerport, Pennsylvania, listed on the NRHP in Pennsylvania
- Chestnut Ridge and Schellsburg Union Church and Cemetery, Napier Township, Pennsylvania
- Union Church and Burial Ground, Philipsburg, Pennsylvania
- St. Paul's Union Church and Cemetery, Ringtown, Pennsylvania
- Union Church (Portsmouth, Rhode Island)
- Highland Chapel Union Church, Ridgetop, Tennessee
- Big Spring Union Church, Springdale, Tennessee
- Fletcher Union Church, Fletcher, Vermont
- Union Church (New Haven, Vermont)
- Beaver Meadow Union Chapel, Norwich, Vermont
- Earlysville Union Church, Earlysville, Virginia

=== Other churches ===
- Greek Catholic Church
- Union Church (Australia), a building maintained by a local trust and available to multiple denominations
- Union Church, Hong Kong
- Union Church (Shanghai), China
- Union Church of Santo Domingo, Dominican Republic

== Other places ==
- Union Church, Mississippi, US
- Union Church, Wisconsin, US

== See also ==
- Union Baptist Church (disambiguation)
- Union Cemetery (disambiguation)
- Union Chapel (disambiguation)
- Union Congregational Church (disambiguation)
- Union Episcopal Church (disambiguation)
- Union Meetinghouse (disambiguation)
- Union Presbyterian Church (disambiguation)
