= Union Chapel =

Union Chapel may refer to:

== United Kingdom ==
- Union Chapel, Brighton
- Union Chapel, Islington

== United States ==
National Register of Historical Places

(by state, then city/town)

- Pine Orchard Union Chapel, Branford, Connecticut, listed on the National Register of Historic Places (NRHP) in New Haven County
- East Raymond Union Chapel, East Raymond, Maine, listed on the NRHP in Cumberland County
- Union Chapel (Glenwood, Maryland), listed on the NRHP in Howard County
- Union Chapel (Oak Bluffs, Massachusetts), listed on the NRHP in Dukes County
- Union Chapel (Hillsborough, New Hampshire), listed on the NRHP in Hillsborough County
- Union Chapel (North Hampton, New Hampshire)
- Union Chapel (Cornwall-on-Hudson, New York), listed on the NRHP in Orange County
- Ponckhockie Union Chapel, Kingston, New York, listed on the NRHP in Ulster County
- Union Chapel (Shelter Island Heights, New York), listed on the NRHP in Suffolk County
- Union Chapel (Windham, New York), listed on the NRHP in Greene County
- Beaver Meadow Union Chapel, Norwich, Vermont, listed on the NRHP in Windsor County

Places

- Union Chapel, Alabama

== See also ==
- Union Church (disambiguation)
