= Union Meetinghouse =

Union Meetinghouse or Union Meeting House, or variations, may refer to: (sorted by state, then city/town)

- Old Union Meetinghouse, Farmington, Maine, listed on the National Register of Historic Places (NRHP) in Franklin County
- Mercer Union Meetinghouse, Mercer, Maine, listed on the NRHP in Somerset County
- Readfield Union Meeting House, Readfield, Maine, listed on the NRHP in Kennebec County
- Union Meeting House, (Former), Westport, Maine, listed on the NRHP in Lincoln County
- Union Meetinghouse (Gilford, New Hampshire), listed on the New Hampshire State Register of Historic Places
- Union Meetinghouse-Universalist Church, Kensington, New Hampshire, listed on the NRHP in Rockingham County
- Union Meeting House (Cape Vincent, New York), listed on the NRHP in Jefferson County
- Union Meeting House (Burke, Vermont), listed on the NRHP in Caledonia County
- Union Meetinghouse (East Montpelier, Vermont), listed on the NRHP in Washington County
- Union Meetinghouse (Ferrisburg, Vermont), listed on the NRHP in Addison County
