= Theodore Otto Langerfeldt =

German born American painter (1841–1906)

- Born: March 2, 1841; Bückeburg, Schaumburg-Lippe
- Died: September 7, 1906 (aged 65); Boston, Massachusetts
- Education: Polytechnische Schule
- Known for: Watercoloring; painting; architectural rendering

Theodore Otto Langerfeldt (March 2, 1841 – September 7, 1906) was a German-American architectural renderer, watercolorist, and painter.

== Biography ==
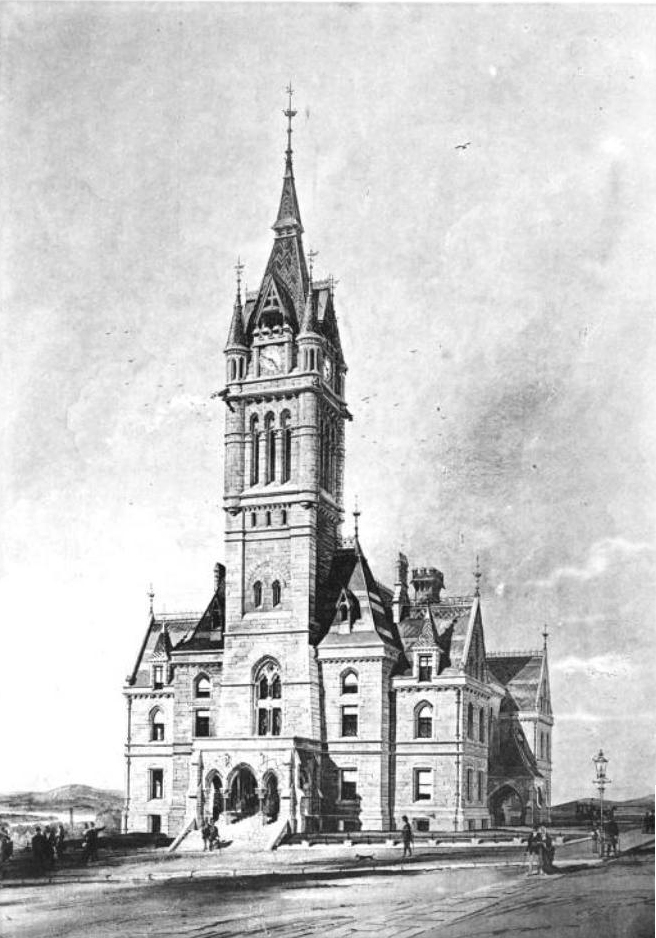
Holyoke City Hall in Holyoke, Massachusetts, Charles B. Atwood, architect, Langerfeldt, artist.

Langerfeldt was born March 2, 1841, in Bückeburg, then capital of the German principality of Schaumburg-Lippe. He studied architecture at Polytechnische Schule in Hanover. Circa 1863 Langerfeldt moved to England, where he studied and worked as a painter for five years. In 1868 he moved to the United States, settling in Boston, Massachusetts. He was first noted in the Boston directories in 1870 as an architect with an office in the Studio Building. From 1875 until his death he is instead noted as a watercolor artist.

Langerfeldt was best known for his architectural subjects, and was often employed by architects of Boston and New York to prepare watercolor perspective renderings for competition entries or exhibitions. These architects included Charles B. Atwood, George A. Clough, George Keller, McKim, Mead & White, Peabody & Stearns, William G. Preston and Frederick W. Stickney. Presenting a watercolor by Langerfeldt with a competition design was considered a great advantage. In 1876, at the Centennial Exposition in Philadelphia, one of his drawings received an award.

He was one of the first artists to provide professional rendering services to architects, preceding a later generation which included E. Eldon Deane, David A. Gregg, and Hughson Hawley, among others. He largely withdrew from work for architects in the 1890s, as his health worsened. Following an illness of ten years, Langerfeldt died September 7, 1906, in Boston.

Langerfeldt signed his drawings "T. O. L." In addition to his architectural work, Langerfeldt also painted landscapes, and had a solo show at the Boston Art Club in 1874. Two of his landscapes are in the collection of the Museum of Fine Arts, Boston.

== Gallery of works ==
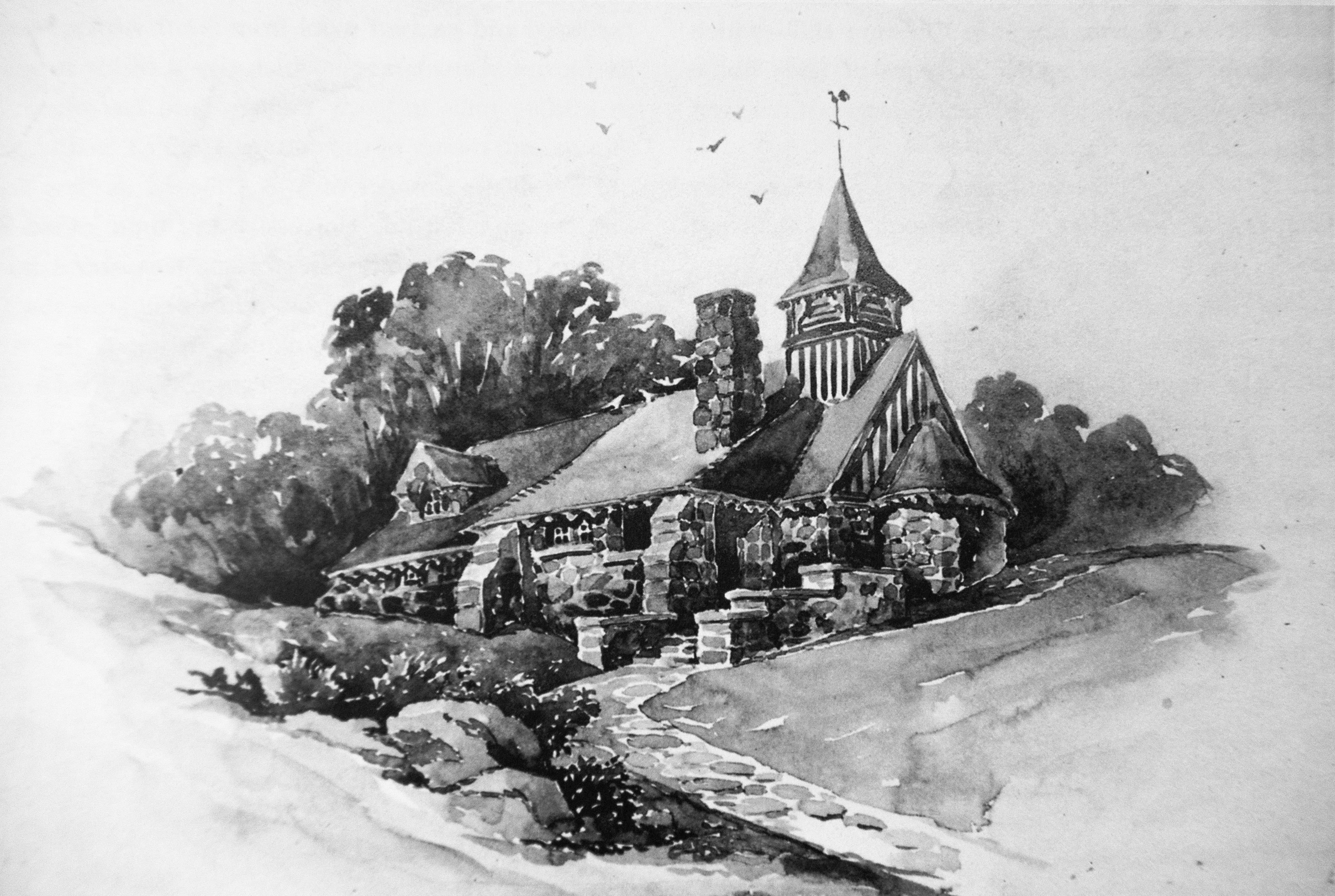
Union Church of Northeast Harbor in Northeast Harbor, Maine, Peabody & Stearns, architects (1887)

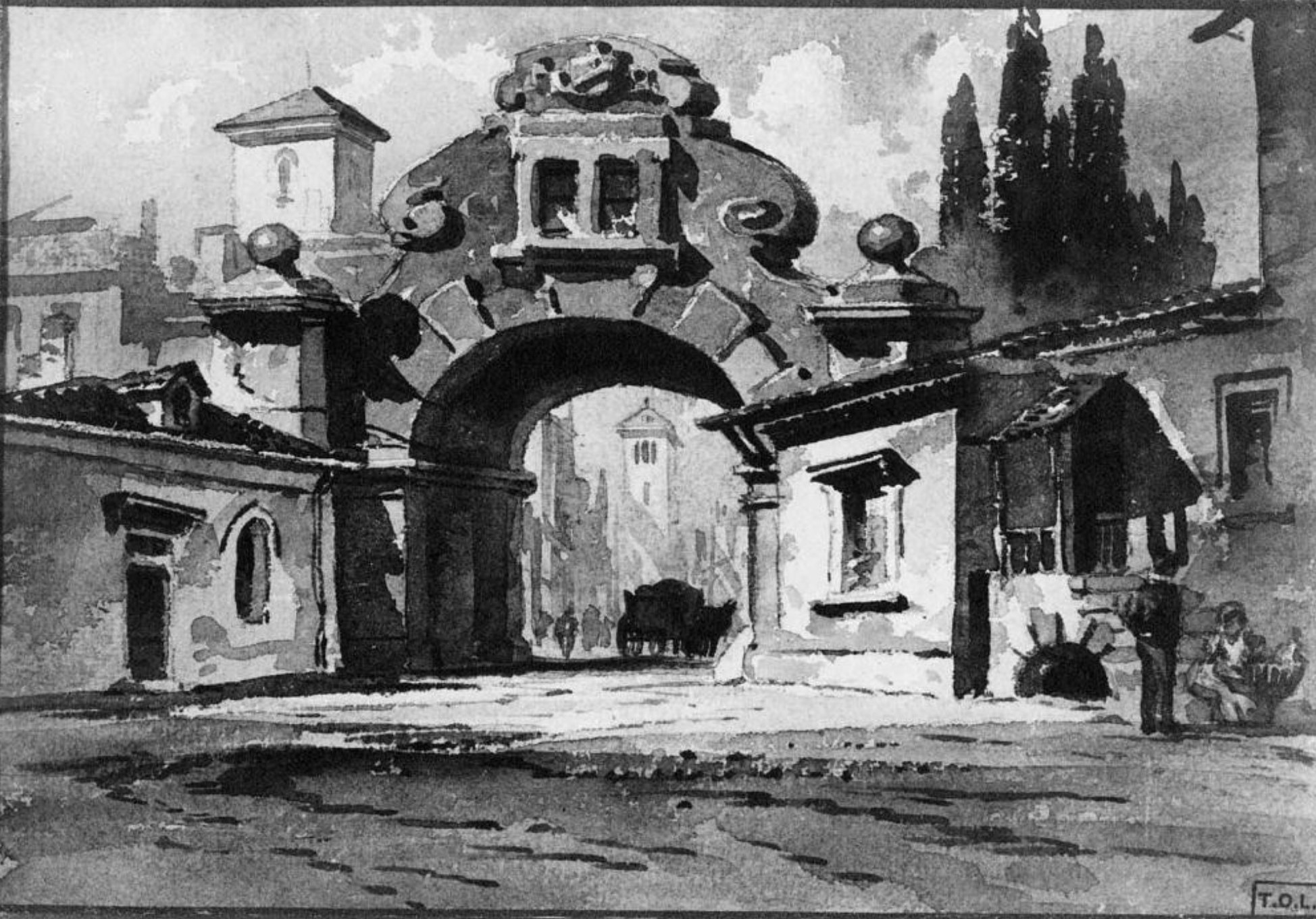
"Landscape with a Baroque Gateway" watercolor.

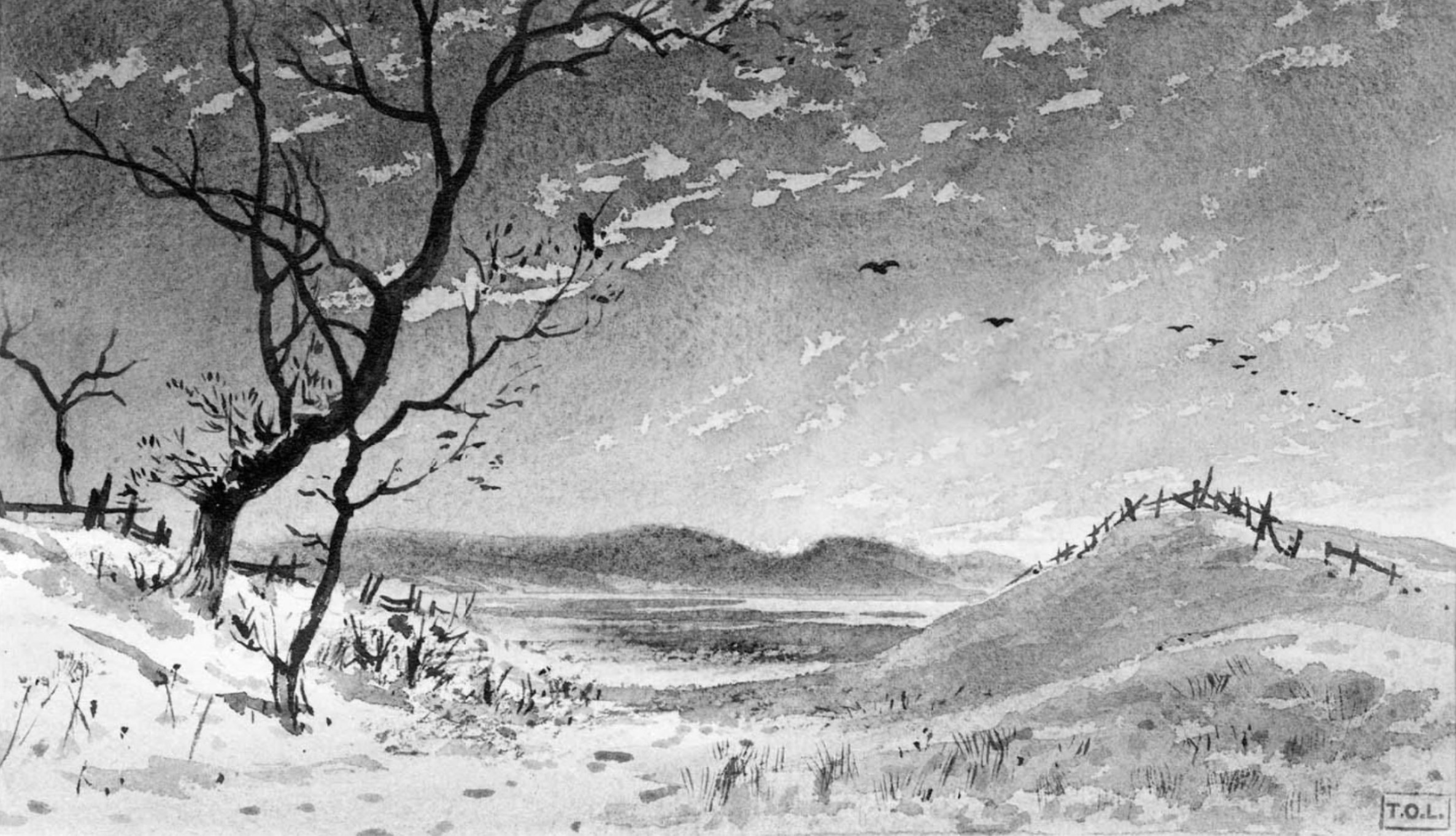
"Winter Landscape" watercolor.

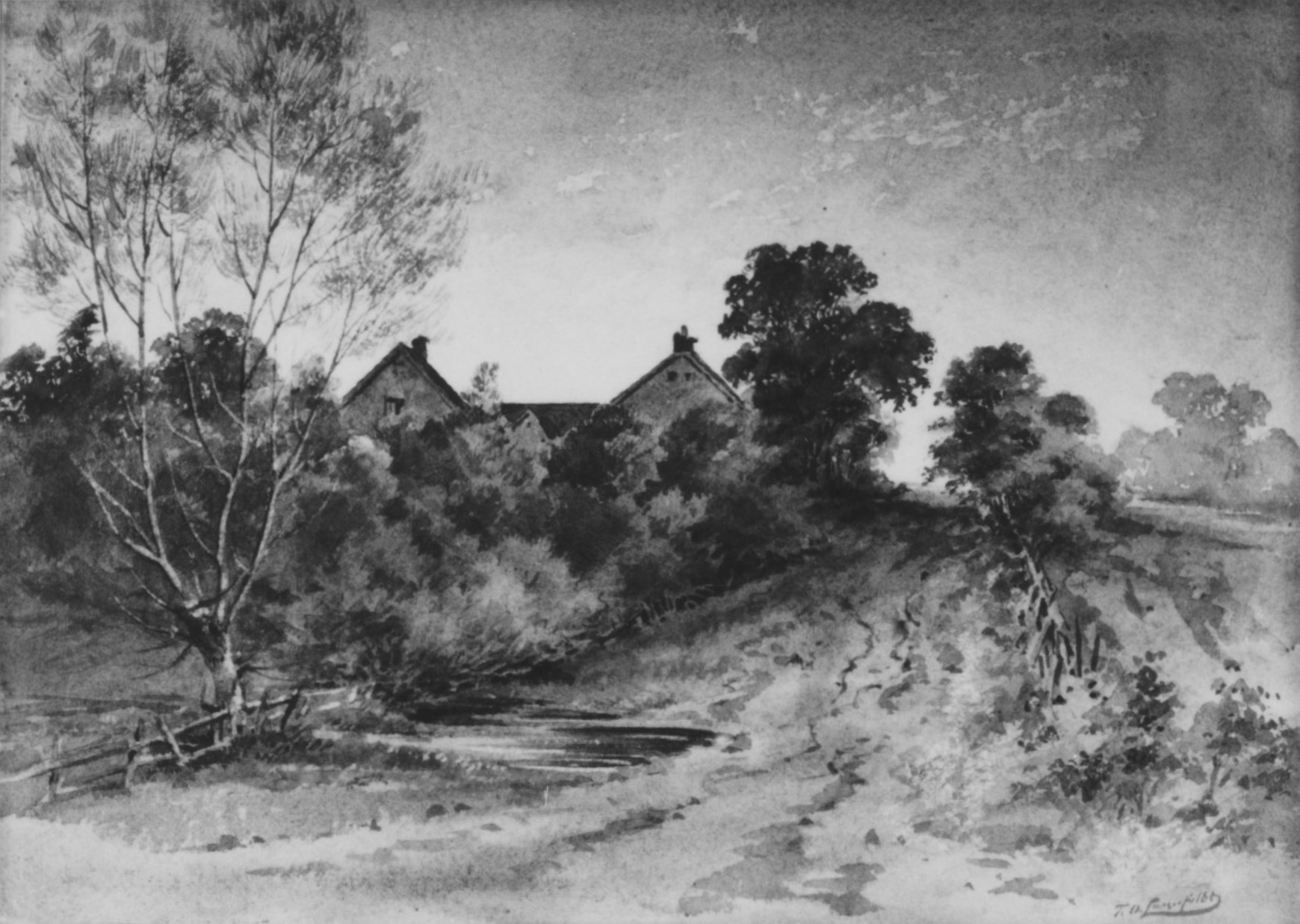
Outdoor rural landscape watercolor in Portsmouth, New Hampshire.

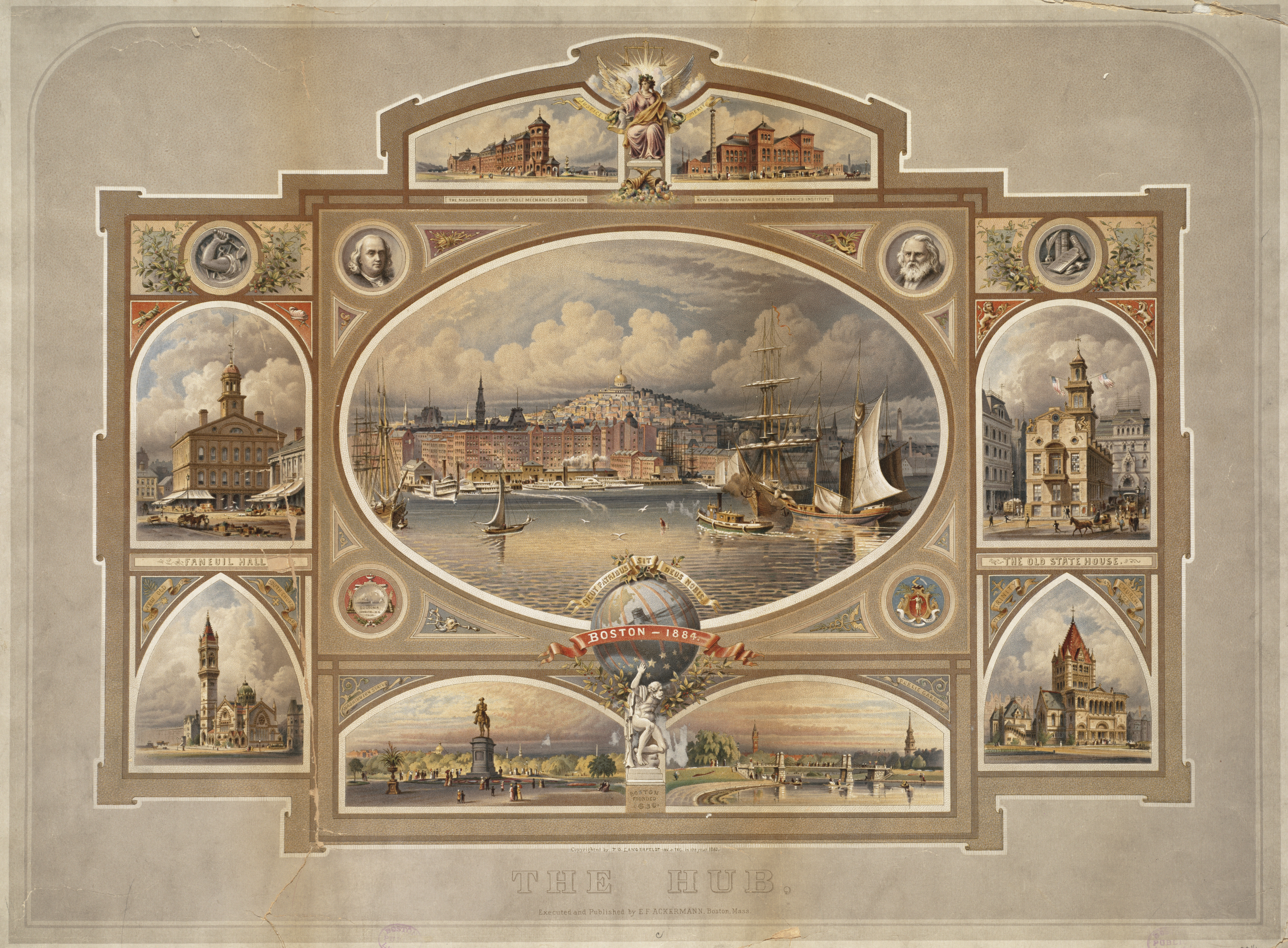
"The Hub" lithograph by Emil F. Ackermann of Langerfeldt paintings of Boston landmarks (1883)

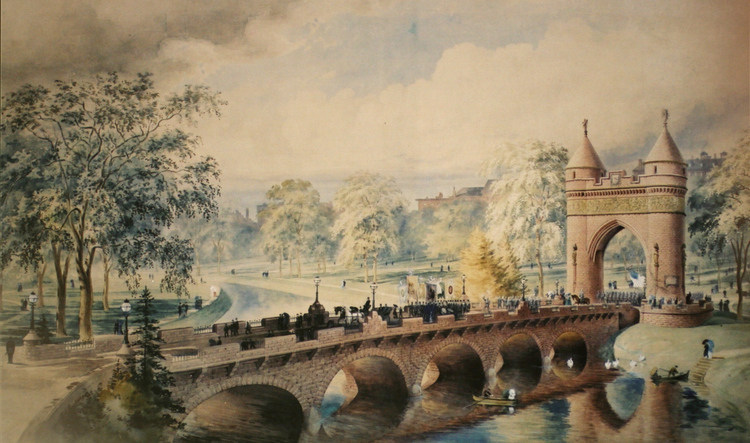
Park River Bridge and Soldiers and Sailors Memorial Arch in Hartford, Connecticut, George Keller, architect, Langerfeldt, artist.
