= Union Presbyterian Church =

Union Presbyterian Church may refer to:

- Union Presbyterian Church (Fort Madison, Iowa), a Presbyterian historic site
- Union Presbyterian Church (Lost Nation, Iowa), another Presbyterian historic site
- Union Presbyterian Church (Stacyville, Iowa), listed on the National Register of Historic Places (NRHP)
- Union Presbyterian Church (St. Peter, Minnesota), NRHP-listed
- Union Presbyterian Church (Scottsville, New York), NRHP-listed
- Union Presbyterian Church & Cemetery, Cowansville, Pennsylvania, another Presbyterian historic site
