= Union Baptist Church =

Union Baptist Church may refer to:

- Union Baptist Church (Hartford, Connecticut), listed on the NRHP in Connecticut
- Union Baptist Church (Baltimore, Maryland), listed on the NRHP in Maryland
- Union Baptist Church (New Bedford, Massachusetts), listed on the NRHP in Massachusetts
- Union Baptist Church (New Rochelle, New York)
- Union Baptist Church (Cincinnati, Ohio)
- Union Baptist Cemetery (Cincinnati, Ohio), listed on the NRHP in Ohio
- West Union Baptist Church, West Union, Oregon, listed on the NRHP in Oregon
- Union Baptist Church (Allentown, Pennsylvania)
