= Union Congregational Church =

Union Congregational Church may refer to several churches in the United States:

Alphabetical by state, then town

- Union Congregational Church (Avon Park, Florida)
- Union Congregational Church (Tavares, Florida)
- Union Congregational Church (Amesbury, Massachusetts), listed on the National Register of Historic Places (NRHP)
- Union Congregational Church (Taunton, Massachusetts), NRHP-listed
- Union Congregational Church (Worcester, Massachusetts), NRHP-listed
- Union Congregational Church (Mackinac Island, Michigan), listed as a Michigan State Historic Site in Mackinac County
- Union Congregational Church and Parsonage, Buffalo, Wyoming, NRHP-listed

== See also ==
- Union Park Congregational Church and Carpenter Chapel, Chicago, Illinois, NRHP-listed
- Union Valley Congregational Church, Taylor, New York, NRHP-listed
