= Union Baptist Church (Allentown, Pennsylvania) =

Coordinates: 40.60719°N 75.47220°W

Union Baptist Church is a Baptist church in Allentown, Pennsylvania, United States. It is a historically black church that was founded by the Reverend Dr Horace A Melton.

== History ==
Union Baptist Church was established in 1946 (80 years ago) with only eight members in its congregation.

The church had its first services in 1946 at the David Tea Room at 372 Union Street. In 1960, the church continued to grow, and moved to a larger building on Linden Street, in Allentown.

In 1979, the church moved again to its current building of worship which is located at 302–10 N 6th St.in Allentown.

In 1995, an executive pastor was appointed, Pastor Nathaniel H. Jenkins. He was succeeded by the churches first female Assistant Pastor, Pastor Yuvette Hailey who was ordained and appointed in 2021 and is currently holding this position. In 2021, the church also ordained and appointed a Pastor of Preaching, Pastor Shanise Palmer.

In February 2002, the founder of the Union Baptist Church died; and in 2003, a new Pastor was elected, Pastor Benjamin T Hailey Sr. Pastor Benjamin is the current pastor of the church.

== Worship life ==
The church has a "come as you are" theme of dress. It contains members from different ethnic backgrounds, thus reaching a vast audience. The church holds worship services on Sundays at 8:30 am and 11:15 am. There is a fulfillment hour which starts immediately after the first service on Sunday that helps people to learn more about God and Christian living. There are Bible study classes offered as well on Tuesday nights at 6:30 pm for all ages. There is a mass choir, male chorus and a youth choir that ministers sing along with a praise and worship team. The Union Baptist church has a youth liturgical dance ministry, along with a women's adult liturgical dance ministry that holds a worship explosion each year in November.
