= Union Church (Naples, Maine) =

Historic church in Maine, United States

- U.S. National Register of Historic Places
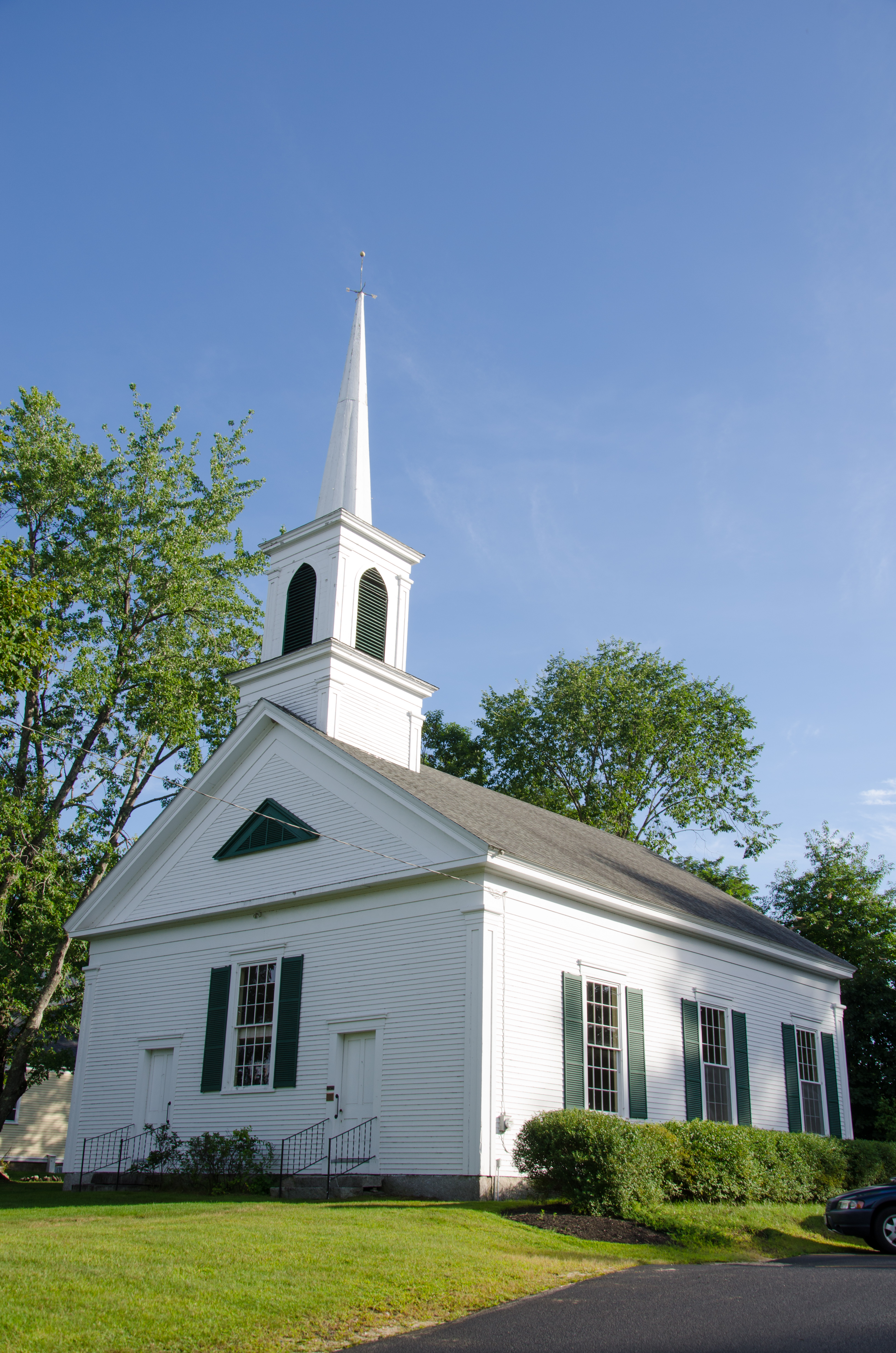

- Location within Maine Location within the United States
- Interactive map showing the location of Naples Union Church
- Location: US 302 S side, 0.1 mi. W of jct. with ME 11/114, Naples, Maine
- Coordinates: 43°58′11″N 70°36′25″W
- Area: less than one acre
- Built: 1857
- Architectural style: Greek Revival, Gothic Revival
- NRHP reference No.: 94000638
- Added to NRHP: June 24, 1994

Union Church is a historic church on United States Route 302 in Naples, Maine. Built in 1857, it is an excellent local example of Greek Revival architecture with Gothic features. Built for use by three different church groups, it now serves as a summer church and community hall. It was listed on the National Register of Historic Places in 1994.

== Description and history ==
The Union Church stands in the town center of Naples, on the south side of US 302, just east of the Naples Public Library. It is a single-story wood frame structure, with a gabled roof, clapboard siding, and granite foundation. A two-stage square tower rises from the roof ridge, the first stage with corner pilasters, and the second with pilasters and louvered lancet-arched belfry openings. It is topped by a slender spire. The front facade, facing north, has pilastered corners rising to an entablature and a fully pedimented gable, which has a triangular louvered panel at its center. Identical entrances flank a sash window, each framed by pilasters and an entablature.

The church was built in 1857 (the same year as the Methodist church a short distance west of here), and was originally shared by a Congregationalist group and two Free Will Baptist organizations. By the 1870s the size of these groups had dwindled to the point where they could apparently no longer support full-time ministers, and the building fell into intermittent use. It underwent some alteration in the 1950s, when it saw brief use by an Episcopalian congregation, but most of these changes have been reversed. It is now used as a community resource, hosting social events and occasional religious services.

== See also ==
- National Register of Historic Places listings in Cumberland County, Maine
