= Union Church of Northeast Harbor =

Historic church in Maine, United States

- Seaside United Church of Christ
- Union Church, 2025
- Union Church of Northeast Harbor
- Location: Mount Desert Island
- Address: 21 Summit Road; Northeast Harbor, Maine
- Country: United States
- Denomination: United Church of Christ
- Previous denomination: Baptist; Congregational; Unitarian
- Website: Official website

History
- Status: Active
- Founded: 1883
- Dedicated: July 17, 1889

Architecture
- Architect: Peabody and Stearns
- Architectural type: Shingle style
- Years built: 1887–1889
- Construction cost: $17,989.39

Specifications
- Materials: Fieldstone; wood

Clergy
- Pastor: The Rev. Dr. Joseph F. Cistone (since 2016)
- Union Church of Northeast Harbor
- U.S. National Register of Historic Places
- Location within Maine Location within the United States
- Location: 21 Summit Rd., Northeast Harbor, Maine
- Coordinates: 44°17′40″N 68°17′29″W
- Area: 2.2 acres (0.89 ha)
- Built: 1887
- Architect: Peabody and Stearns
- Architectural style: Shingle style
- NRHP reference No.: 98000722
- Added to NRHP: June 26, 1998

The Union Church of Northeast Harbor is a historic church at 21 Summit Road in Northeast Harbor, Maine. Designed by Peabody and Stearns and built in 1887, it is a notable local example of Shingle style architecture. It was listed on the National Register of Historic Places in 1998. The Union Church and the Union Congregtional Church of Seal Harbor (The Abby Chapel) Seaside UCC were yoked in ministry for many years. The combined United Church of Christ of Northeast Harbor & Seal Harbor was formally renamed Seaside United Church of Christ in 2016. Seaside UCC is a Just Peace and Open & Affirming Congregation, affiliated with the United Church of Christ. The Rev. Dr. Joseph F. Cistone has served as Seaside’s Pastor since 2016.

== History and description ==
The church congregation was established in 1883, with the first meetings being held in a local one room schoolhouse. In 1886, the 100 member congregation—a mix of 65 summer and 35 full-time residents—formally organized as the Union Church Association. They acquired the land for the building from Samuel N. Gilpatrick, who had donated the land. The Association formed a building committee which consisted of Charles William Eliot, a summer resident, in addition to brothers Danforth and Ansel Manchester. in 1887, the committee chose the noted Boston firm of Peabody and Stearns, one of New England's leading architectural firms of the period, to design the new church building. In 1889, the building was completed in and dedicated on July 17, 1889. The cost of the project and construction totaled $17,989.39.

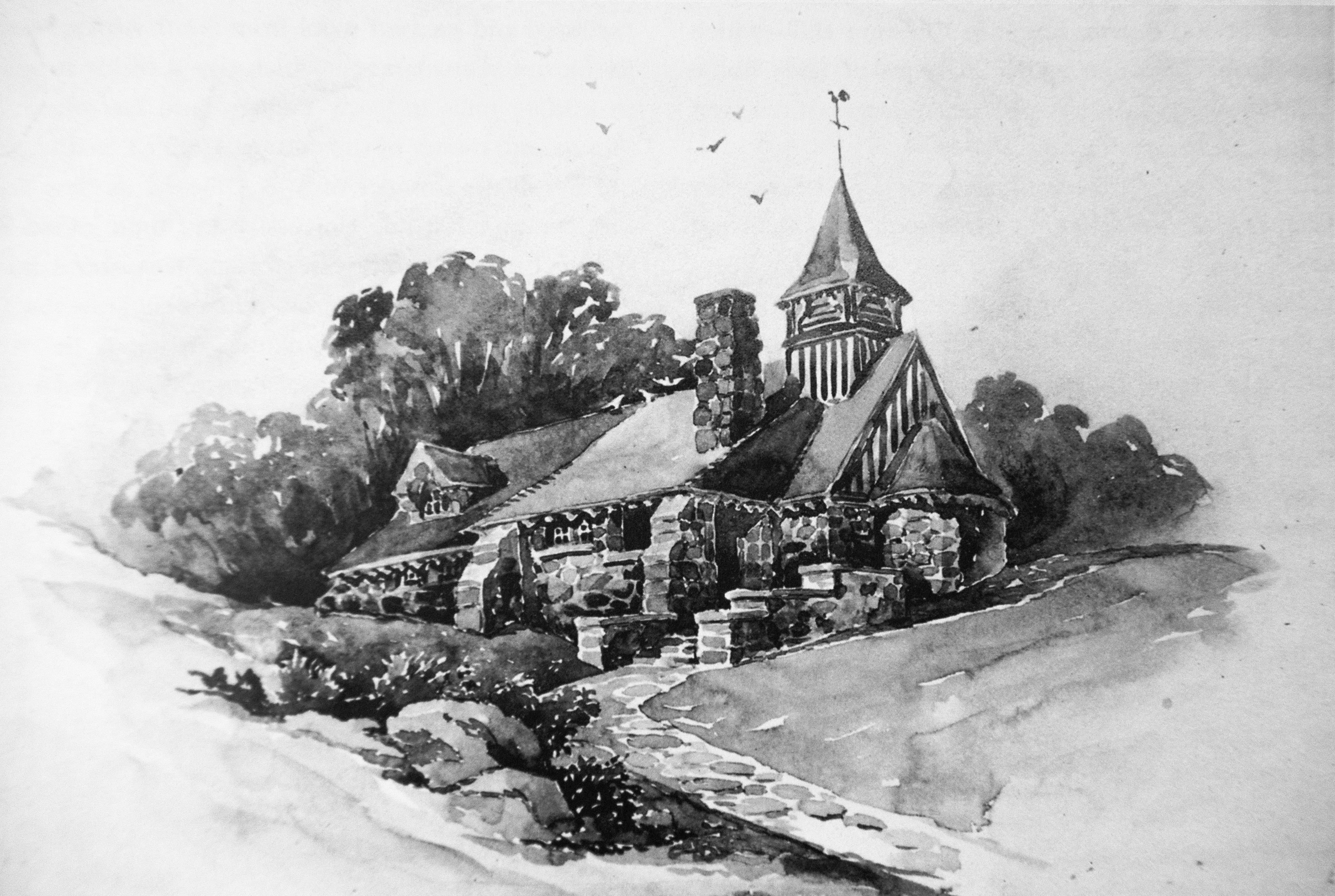
1887 watercolor by Theodore Otto Langerfeldt

Peabody and Stearns were also responsible for alterations to the transept gable ends made in 1913, costing $2,314.82. This church was highlighted among those built along Maine's seacoast for its particularly organic appearance in relationship to its surroundings and Scandinavian influence.

The Union Church is set on the northeast side of Summit Road, just north of its junction with Joy Road in a residential area of Northeast Harbor, on Schoolhouse Ledge. It is a cruciform structure, built out of stone and wood. Most of the structure is built out of glacial till, with dressed granite corner quoins, and stone buttresses. The end of the transept is finished in vertical board-and-batten siding, and the roof is finished in wood shingles. A squat stone tower rises above the southeastern end of the building. The street-facing façade of the church presents its long axis, with the long nave to the left, and the main entrance just to the right of the south transept, sheltered by a buttressed porch.

== See also ==
- National Register of Historic Places listings in Hancock County, Maine
