= Union Episcopal Church =

Union Episcopal Church and variations may refer to:

- Union Episcopal Church (Claremont, New Hampshire), listed on the NRHP in New Hampshire
- St. Bartholomew's Episcopal Church (Montgomery, Vermont), formerly Union Episcopal Church, listed on the NRHP
