= Union Church (Davis City, Iowa) =

- U.S. National Register of Historic Places
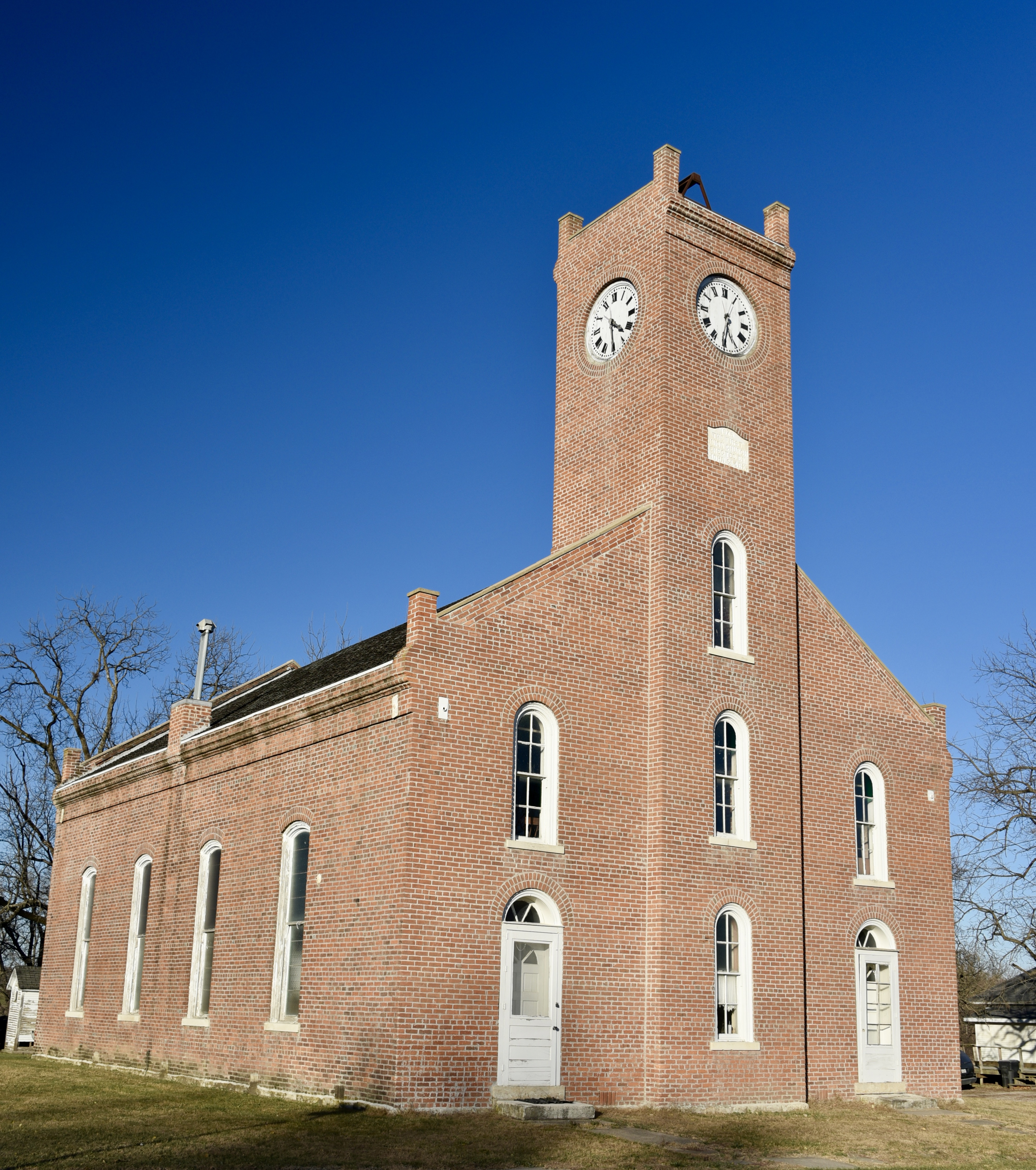

- Location within Iowa Location within the United States
- Location: Clark at Sycamore St. Davis City, Iowa
- Coordinates: 40°38′18″N 93°48′22″W
- Area: 1 acre (0.40 ha)
- Built: 1878
- NRHP reference No.: 76000759
- Added to NRHP: December 12, 1976

Union Church, also known as Brick Church, is a historic church building located in Davis City, Iowa, United States. For the first 20 years of its existence, Davis City did not have a church. This church was built at the instigation of John Clark in 1878. Clark was a native of Scotland who was of no particular religious affiliation, but thought "the moral and religious training of the Christian faith of fundamental importance." The church building was accessible to all denominations, and is now owned jointly by Methodist, Presbyterian, and Christian congregations. It was added to the National Register of Historic Places in 1976.

The 36-by-56-foot (11 by 17 m) brick structure features a clock and bell tower on its front facade. The bell is mounted on the outside of the tower. Entry doors, with fan lights, flank the tower. Roman arch windows are used throughout the building.
