= Readfield Union Meeting House =

Historic church in Maine, United States

- U.S. National Register of Historic Places
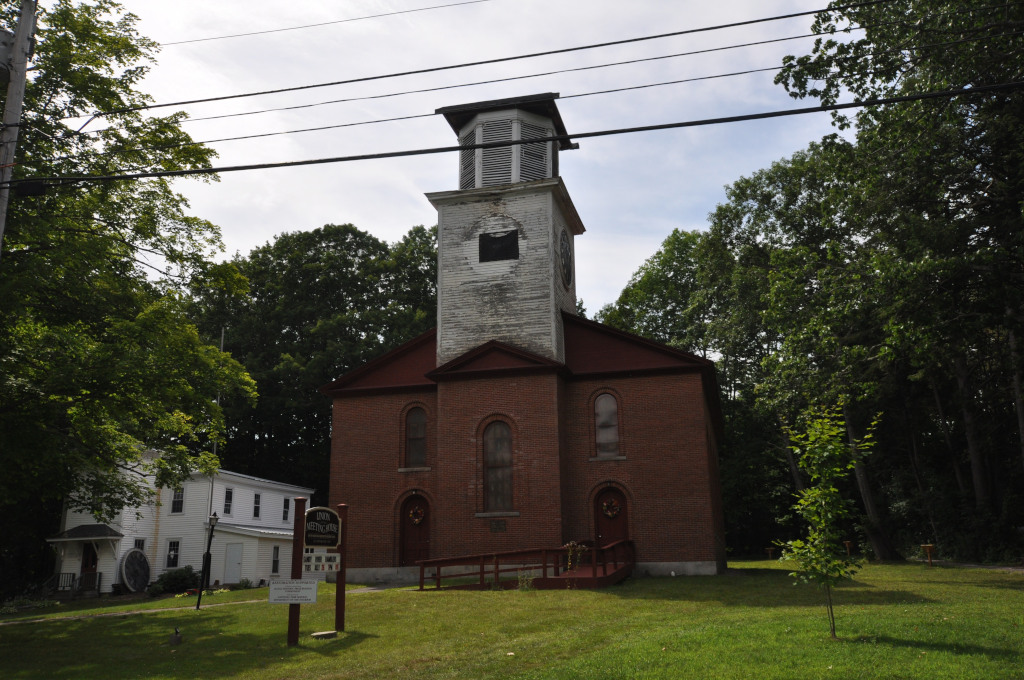

- Location within Maine Location within the United States
- Location: 22 Church Rd., Readfield, Maine
- Coordinates: 44°23′22″N 69°58′1″W
- Area: 0.3 acres (0.12 ha)
- Built: 1828
- Architect: Multiple
- Architectural style: Federal
- NRHP reference No.: 82000756
- Added to NRHP: July 08, 1982

The Readfield Union Meeting House is a historic brick meeting house at 22 Church Road in Readfield, Maine. Built in 1828, it is a particularly fine example of Federal period architecture for a rural context. It was listed on the National Register of Historic Places in 1982.

== Description and history ==
The Readfield Union Meeting House stands in Readfield's main village, on the west side of Church Road, a short way north of its junction with Maine State Route 41. It is a single-story brick building, with a gable roof topped by a frame tower. The tower projects slightly from the front facade, and has a single tall round-arch window at the center of first level, with a low pedimented gable separating the brick base from the upper stages. The tall second stage is square, with a clock in the upper section; it is topped by an octagonal belfry with louvered openings flanked by Doric pilasters. It is covered by a bell-cast roof. Flanking the tower on the front facade are bays with building entrances at the ground level, with round-arch windows above. The side walls have tall round-arch windows set in recessed openings.

Originally built in 1828, the church is an unusually fine example of Federal period church architecture in rural interior Maine. The building was remodeled in 1866-1868 by Hubbard Lovejoy, an architect and builder of central Maine. Part of this renovation included the painting of the walls and ceiling in the trompe-l'œil style, claimed to be the work of artist Charles J. Schumacher of Portland, Maine.

More information is available on the Readfield Union Meeting House Official Website: https://www.unionmeetinghouse.org.

== See also ==
- National Register of Historic Places listings in Kennebec County, Maine
