= Greenwood Union Church =

Historic church in Massachusetts, United States

- U.S. National Register of Historic Places
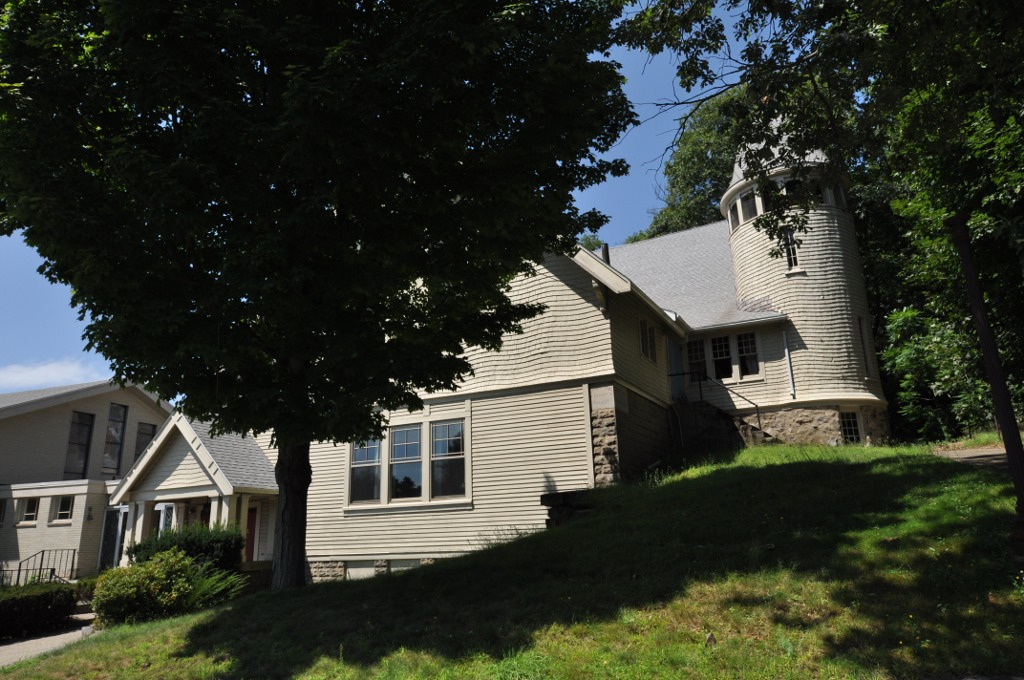
- The 1884 portion of the church

- Location within Massachusetts Location within the United States
- Location: Wakefield, Massachusetts
- Coordinates: 42°28′57″N 71°4′0″W
- Built: 1884
- Architect: Wait & Cutter
- Architectural style: Queen Anne
- MPS: Wakefield MRA
- NRHP reference No.: 89000697
- Added to NRHP: July 6, 1989

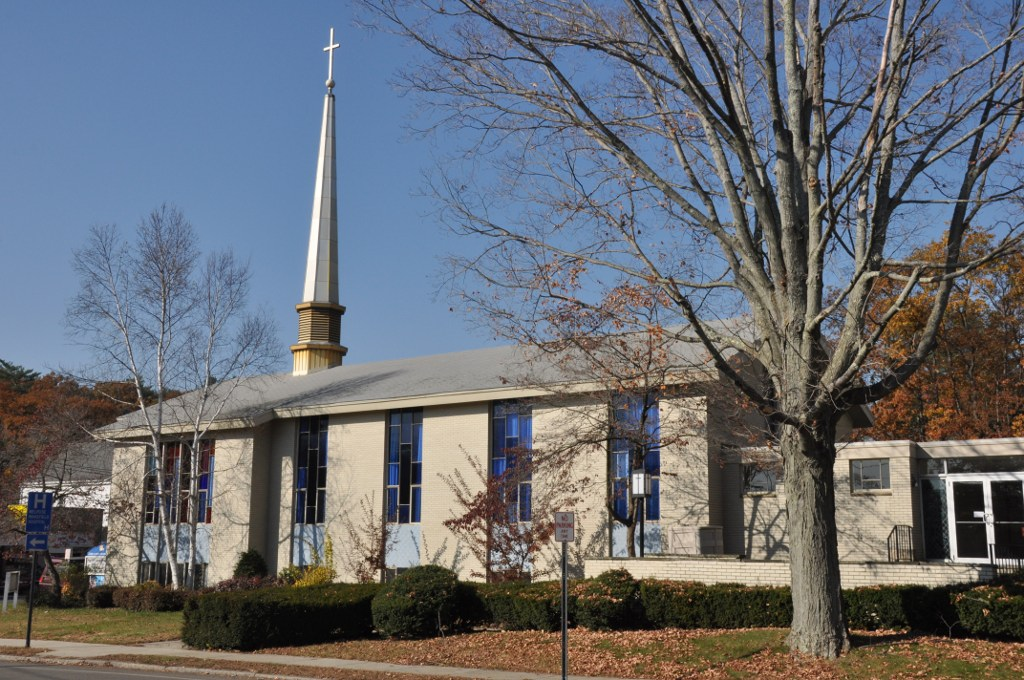
The new portion of the church

Greenwood Union Church is a historic church at 4 Oak Street in Wakefield, Massachusetts. The church was built in 1884 and added to the National Register of Historic Places in 1989.

== History and description ==
The early beginnings of the Greenwood Union Church can be traced through historical records to the mid-1850s when the Sunday School was organized under the leadership of Henry Degan. The founders met in the unoccupied room of the Greenwood School House (also referred to as the old Hose House). After the First Congregational Society of Greenwood was organized in 1873, the members immediately began planning for a building of their own. When the school department needed their meeting room, they set out to find land, subsequently purchasing some land from the Joseph Eaton estate on Oak Street. Architects Wait & Cutter were commissioned to design the church, and the foundation was laid in November 1884. The ground floor of the building was in use by 1885. The upper floors were not completed until 1895, with a dedication held on February 27, 1895. The Greenwood Union Church was organized on November 19, 1903. In 1907, a one-story addition provided classrooms and a two-story addition provided a parlor for the Ladies' Aid society. Extensive remodeling and another addition, which extended the building twenty-two feet (6.7 m) closer to Oak Street, began in 1920. The front of the sanctuary became the side and the new front faced back to the hill. The dedication was held on April 16, 1922. In 1944, a Parish House Fund was established which resulted in the purchase of the neighboring Willard Eaton property in 1952. In January 1956, the church secured the corner lot at Oak and Main Street for further expansion, and the cornerstone of the new building was laid on September 25, 1960. The dedication took place in March 1961.

As of 2021, the church has been purchased and renamed Restoration Road Church.

== See also ==
- National Register of Historic Places listings in Wakefield, Massachusetts
- National Register of Historic Places listings in Middlesex County, Massachusetts
