= Union Chapel (Windham, New York) =

- Mitchell Hollow Mission Church
- U.S. National Register of Historic Places
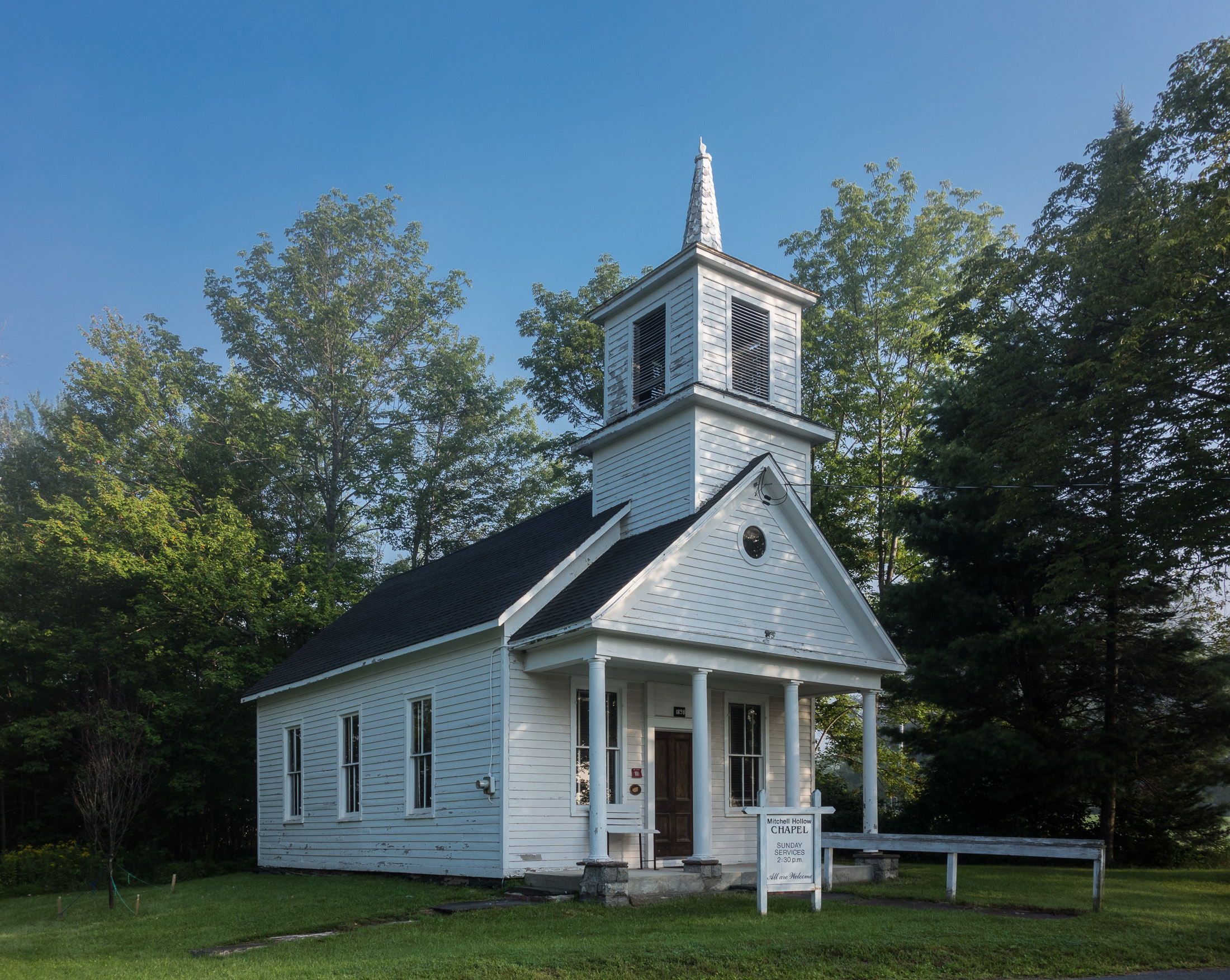
- Union Chapel, one morning in August 2013

- Location within New York Location within the United States
- Location: Mill Rd., Windham, New York
- Coordinates: 42°21′11″N 74°14′43″W
- Area: less than one acre
- Built: 1897
- Architectural style: Classical Revival
- NRHP reference No.: 01001394
- Added to NRHP: December 28, 2001

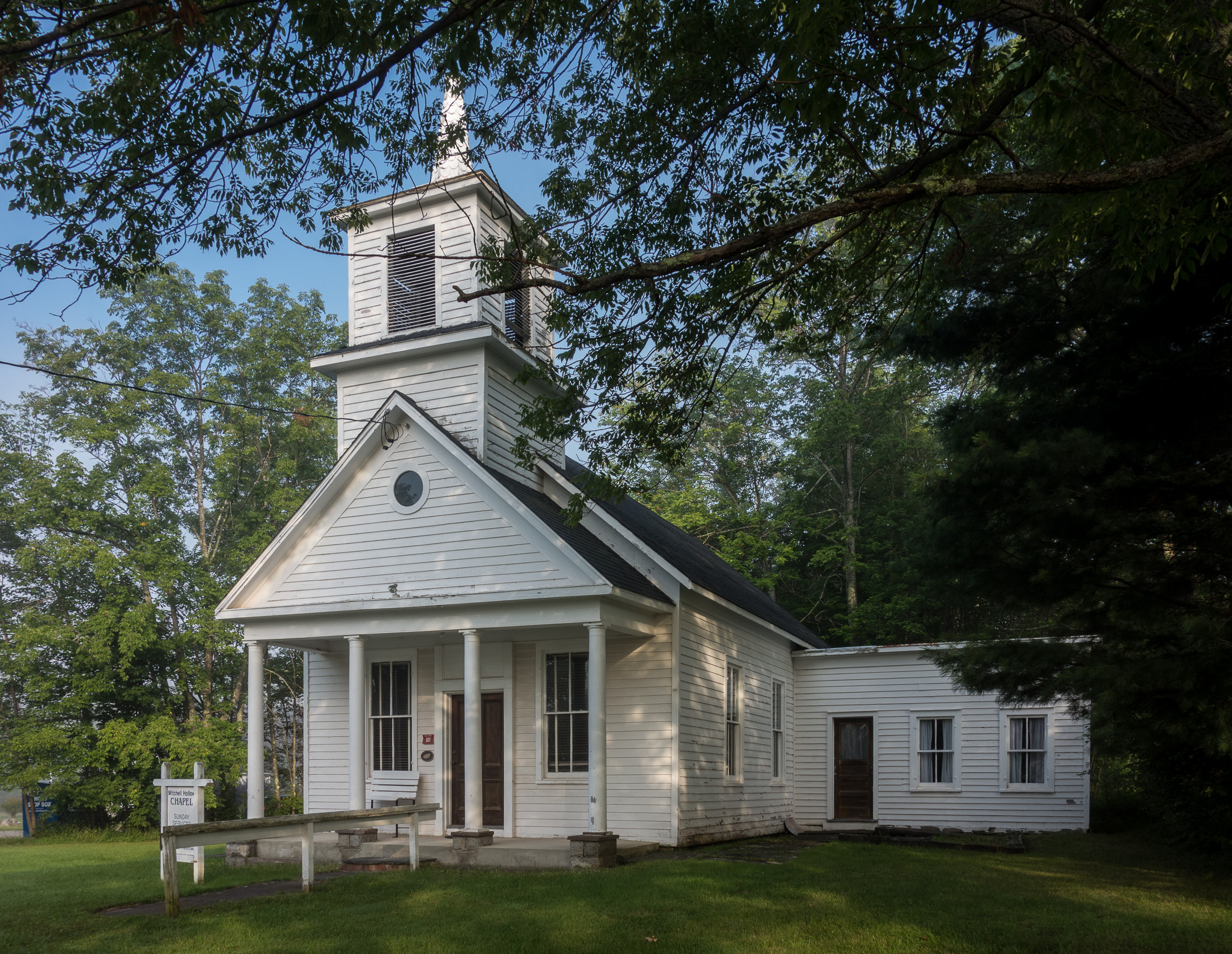
Another view

Mitchell Hollow Mission Church, also known as Mitchell Hollow Union Chapel, is a historic chapel on Mill Road in Windham, Greene County, New York. It was built in 1897 and is a one-story, three by three bay, wood-frame structure resting on a stone and concrete foundation. It is sheathed in narrow clapboards and features a fully pedimented portico and a two-stage bell tower. It was built by the local Methodist Episcopal and Presbyterian congregations.

It was added to the National Register of Historic Places in 2001.
