= Pine Orchard Union Chapel =

- U.S. National Register of Historic Places
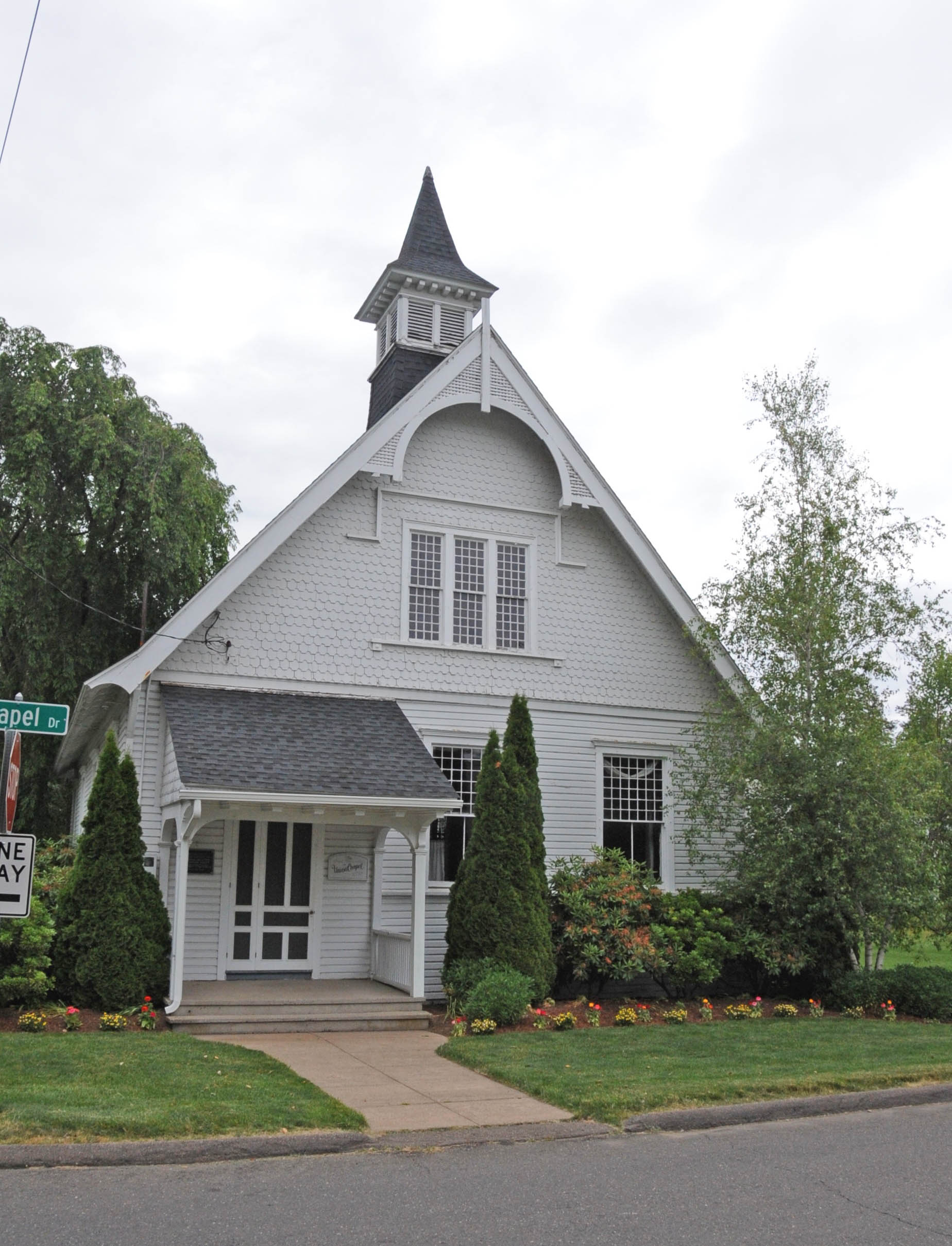

- Location within Connecticut Location within the United States
- Location: 25 Chapel Drive, Branford, Connecticut
- Coordinates: 41°16′0″N 72°46′34″W
- Area: less than one acre
- Built: 1897
- Built by: Harrington, C.W.
- Architect: Brown & Berger
- Architectural style: Queen Anne
- NRHP reference No.: 00000815
- Added to NRHP: July 19, 2000

Pine Orchard Union Chapel is a historic nondenominational chapel at 25 Chapel Drive in Branford, Connecticut. Built in 1897, it is one of a modest number of seasonal resort chapels built along the Connecticut coastline, and a particularly fine example of one with Queen Anne styling. The building was listed on the National Register of Historic Places in 2000.

== Description and history ==
The Pine Orchard Union Chapel is located in the Pine Orchard summer resort area of eastern Branford, at the junction of Chapel Drive and Pine Orchard Street. It is a modest wood frame building, with a flared gable roof whose eaves have exposed rafter tails. A small belfry stands atop the roof, and there is bargeboard and latticework decoration in the gable ends. The interior consists of a small vestibule, and a large open sanctuary, with timbered roof trusses exposed, pine floors and wainscoting, and brass chandeliers. A water closet was added off the vestibule early in the 20th century.

Pine Orchard was first developed as a summer resort area in the 1850s, but experienced major growth as a resort in the 1880s and early 1890s. Its summer residents first seriously considered construction of a seasonal chapel in 1895, and had by the following year raised sufficient funds to begin construction. The present building, designed by Brown and Berger of New Haven, was formally dedicated on July 4, 1897. The original cost for the building was $1,532, with an additional cost of $125 to paint the exterior. In addition to hosting services every July and August, it also hosted lectures and musical performances as well as social events. It continues to be used today, mainly for weddings, memorial services, and meetings.

== See also ==
- National Register of Historic Places listings in New Haven County, Connecticut
