= South Swansea Baptist Church =

Historic church in Massachusetts, United States

- U.S. National Register of Historic Places
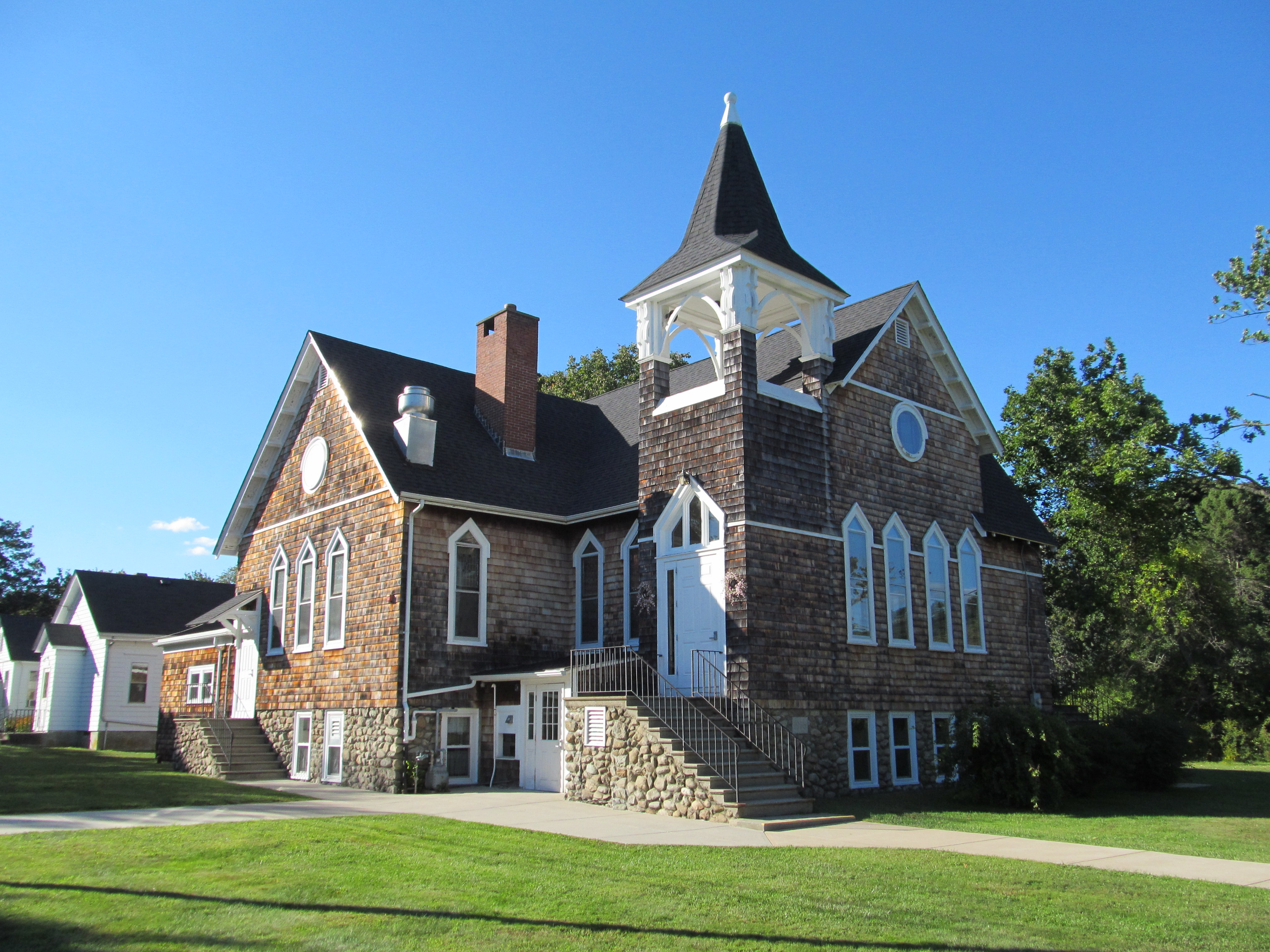
- South Swansea Baptist Church

- Location within Massachusetts Location within the United States
- Location: 25 Church Street, Swansea, Massachusetts
- Coordinates: 41°43′27″N 71°12′5″W
- Built: 1916
- Architectural style: Shingle Style
- MPS: Swansea MRA
- NRHP reference No.: 90000055
- Added to NRHP: February 16, 1990

South Swansea Baptist Church (formerly South Swansea Union Church) is a historic church building in Swansea, Massachusetts. Built in 1916, it is Swansea's best example of a Shingle-style church. The church was listed on the National Register of Historic Places in 1990.

== Description and history ==
The South Swansea Baptist Church is set at the northwest corner of Church Street and Gardner's Neck Road in an otherwise residential area. It is a 1 1/2-story wood-frame structure, set on a raised rubblestone foundation with a gabled roof. A gabled section projects on the south side, and there is at the southeast corner a square tower with an open belvedere below a tent roof. The gables each have groups of lancet-point windows, with a small round window in the gable above. The exterior is clad in wooden shingles, and the overhanging eaves have exposed rafter ends.

The congregation of South Swansea began as a Sunday school operation in 1910, when the Gardner's Neck area was growing rapidly due to suburban residential development. It first met in private homes and other facilities. Religious services were organized in 1915, while land was sought for a church site. The church was completed in September 1916 on land purchased from Edwin Gardner; its architect is unknown. The property also includes a parish house, which dates to the 1960s.

== See also ==
- National Register of Historic Places listings in Bristol County, Massachusetts
