= Union Presbyterian Church (Fort Madison, Iowa) =

Second-oldest Presbyterian congregation in the State of Iowa

Coordinates: 40.6322°N 91.3106°W

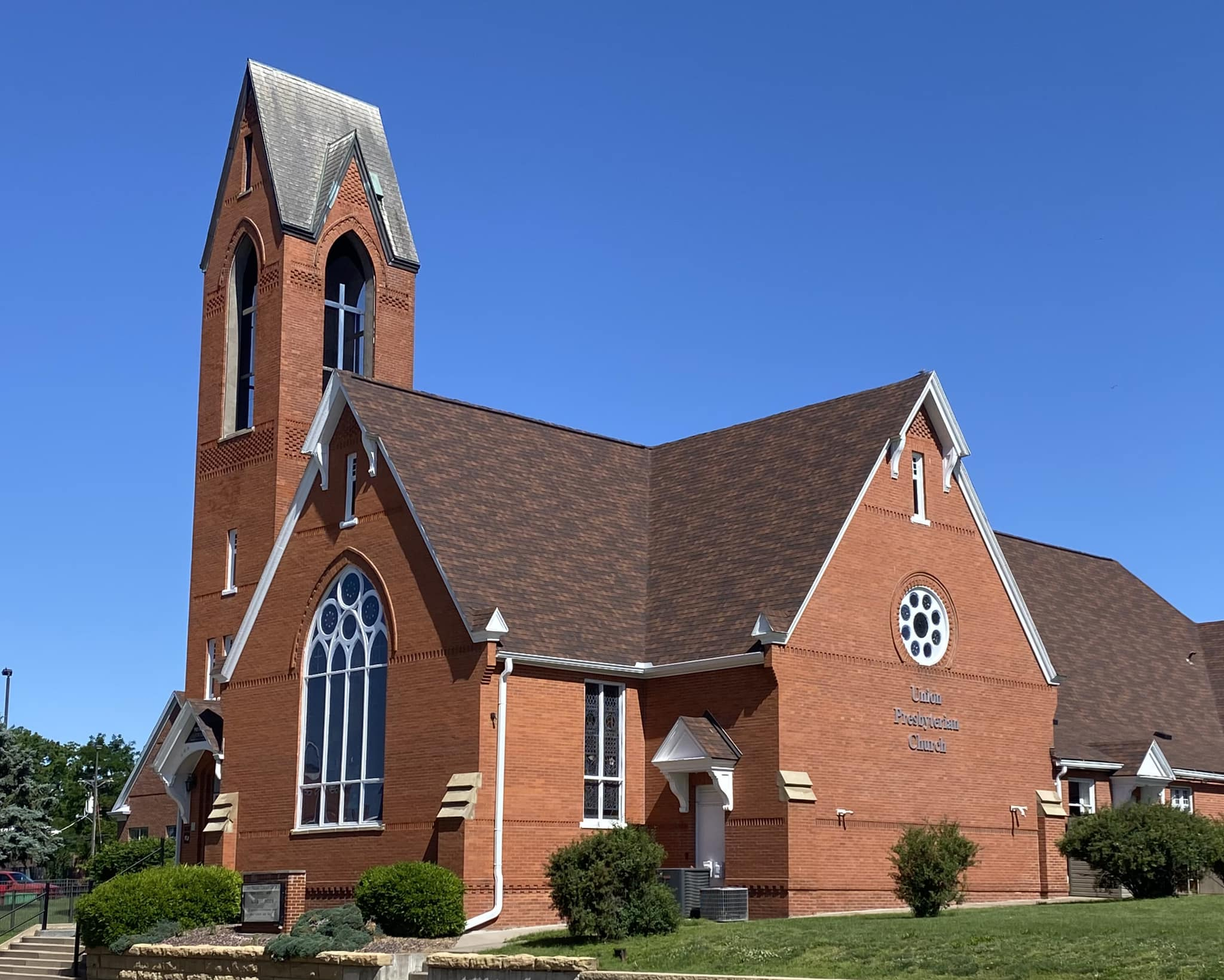
A view of Union Presbyterian Church as seen from Avenue F in Fort Madison

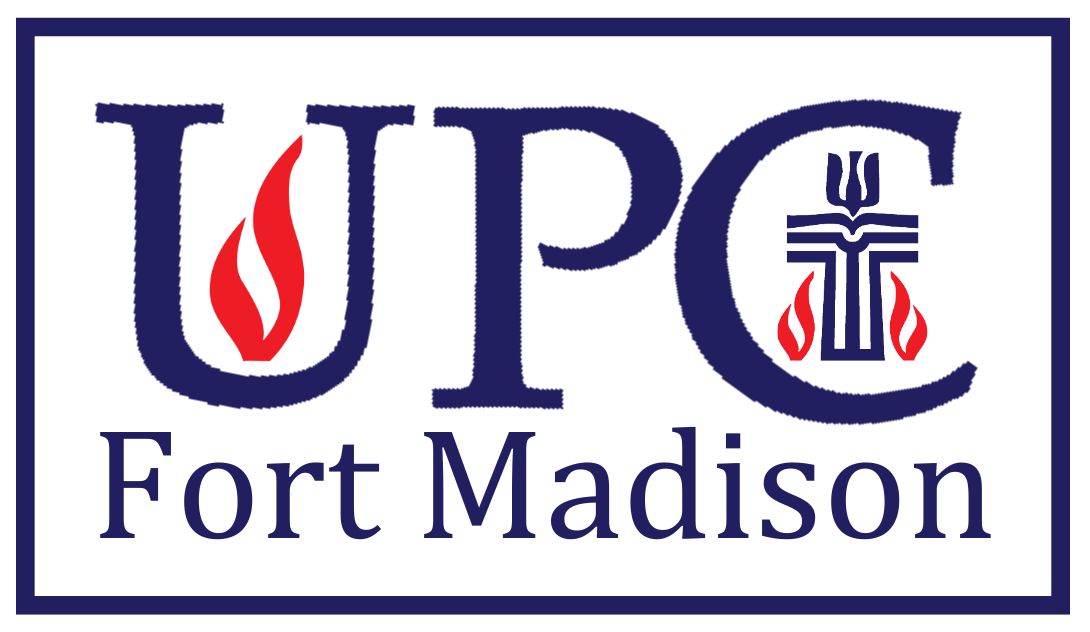
The logo of Union Presbyterian Church

Union Presbyterian Church in Fort Madison, Iowa, is a congregation of the Presbyterian Church (USA) and is a part of the Presbytery of East Iowa, which is part of the Synod of Lakes and Prairies. Union Presbyterian Church is designated as a Presbyterian Historic Site by the Presbyterian Historical Society.

The identity statement, according to the church's website, is "An Open, Caring, Compassionate Community of Faith."

The current pastor is the Rev'd John Allen T. Bankson.

On March 26, 1838, less than two years after the founding of the city of Fort Madison by Gen. John Holly Knapp and his cousin, Nathaniel Rundell Knapp, the Rev. James Augustus Clark was sent by the American Home Missionary Society to organize a Presbyterian church. Clark would become the church's first pastor.

The Fort Madison Presbyterian Church (as it was then known) was the second Presbyterian congregation to be founded in Iowa, after the West Point Presbyterian Church in nearby West Point, Iowa.

The founding of the church was near the beginning of the Old School-New School Controversy in the Presbyterian Church, and the fledgling Fort Madison congregation split into two groups in 1840, only two years after being organized. Rev. J.A. Clark and a portion of the members joined the New School, and the remaining members joined the Old School. The two resulting congregations remained separate for twenty years. On January 2, 1860, the Old School and New School congregations merged, adopting the name Union Presbyterian Church.

One of the most significant pastors in the church's history was Rev. Dr. George D. Stewart (1824–1910), who served the church from 1877 until his retirement in 1904. In 1885, under Dr. Stewart's leadership, the congregation built the brick structure at 7th Street and Avenue F in Fort Madison where it still worships to this day.

== Leadership ==
Union Presbyterian Church has had a total of nineteen pastors since its founding:

Pastors of Union Presbyterian Church
Name	Year Called
James Augustus Clark	1838
Robert C. McComb	1854
Chauncey Perkins Taylor	1859
George D. Stewart	1877
Harry Clayton Rogers	1904
Frank Gageby	1908
William Graham	1915
Warren F. Goff	1919
Walter Turney	1931
William Pfautz	1954
John Lewis	1965
Arthur Nash	1971
Roger Todd	1982
Marvin Potter	1984
Judith L. Arnold	1997
Robert O. Robinson	2004
Mark Binder	2007
Nancy Oehler Love	2015
John Allen T. Bankson	2024

== See also ==
- List of Christian denominations#Presbyterianism
- List of Presbyterian churches
- American Presbyterian/Reformed Historic Sites Registry
