= East Raymond Union Chapel =

Historic church in Maine, United States

- U.S. National Register of Historic Places
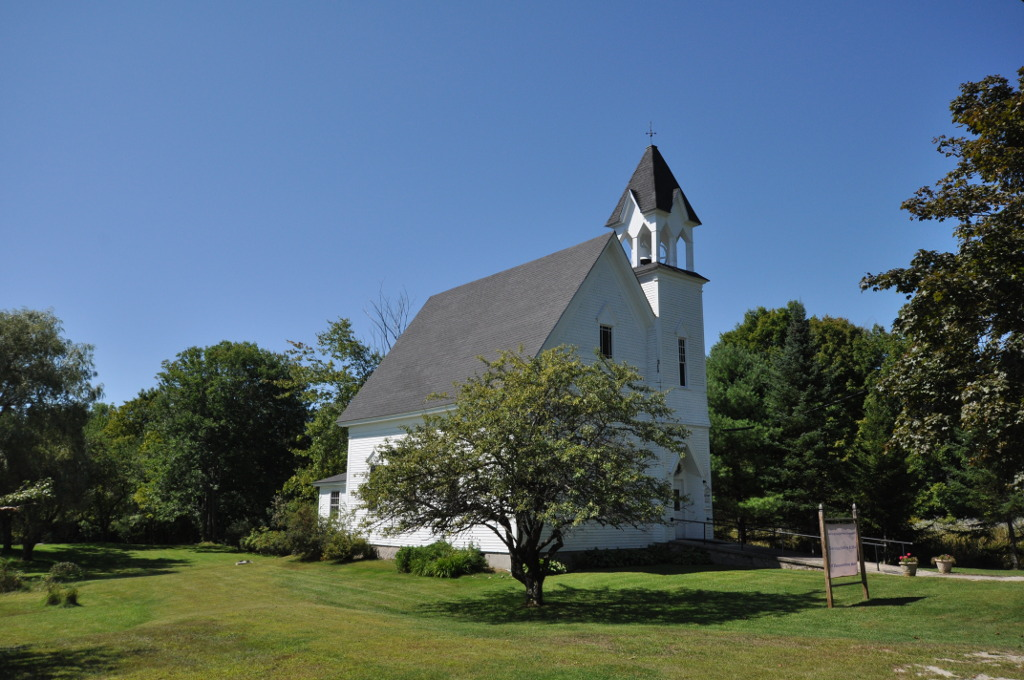

- Location within Maine Location within the United States
- Location: 394 Webbs Mills Rd., East Raymond, Maine
- Coordinates: 43°56′2″N 70°26′29″W
- Area: 0.3 acres (0.12 ha)
- Built: 1890
- Architectural style: Queen Anne, Gothic
- NRHP reference No.: 04000370
- Added to NRHP: April 28, 2004

The East Raymond Union Chapel is a historic chapel at 394 Webbs Mills Road in East Raymond, Maine. Built in 1890, it is a modest wood-frame building with Queen Anne and Gothic Revival styling. It has served as a non-denominational religious meeting place for much of its time; it is now affiliated with the United Church of Christ and the Casco Village Church in Casco. It has scheduled services during the summer. The building was listed on the National Register of Historic Places in 2004.

== Description and history ==
The East Raymond Union Chapel is located on the south side of Webbs Mill Road (Maine State Route 85) in the center of the rural village of East Raymond. It is a modest single-story wood-frame structure, with a steeply pitched gable roof and a square tower at its northeast corner. The exterior is clad in a combination of clapboards and decorative wooden shingles. The three-stage tower houses the building entrance in a Gothic-arched recess on the ground floor, and an open belfry at the top, with pointed-arch openings and gablets rising above, into the pyramidal roof. The main front facade has a single bay with a pair of narrow sash windows under a Queen Anne hood, and a similar single sash window in the gable above. The interior of the church has original pine bench pews, and a raised altar platform with Eastlake-style furnishings.

The chapel was built between 1880 and 1890 as a local community project, organized under the auspices of a benevolent society established for the purpose. It does not have a known designer, and its design represents a late use of Gothic Revival elements (which had fallen out of fashion in Maine in the 1850s), and a modern (for the period) use of Queen Anne and Eastlake elements. The building has had relatively few alterations since its construction, principally to accommodate a ramp at the entrance.

== See also ==
- National Register of Historic Places listings in Cumberland County, Maine
