= Beaver Meadow Union Chapel =

Historic church in Vermont, United States

- U.S. National Register of Historic Places
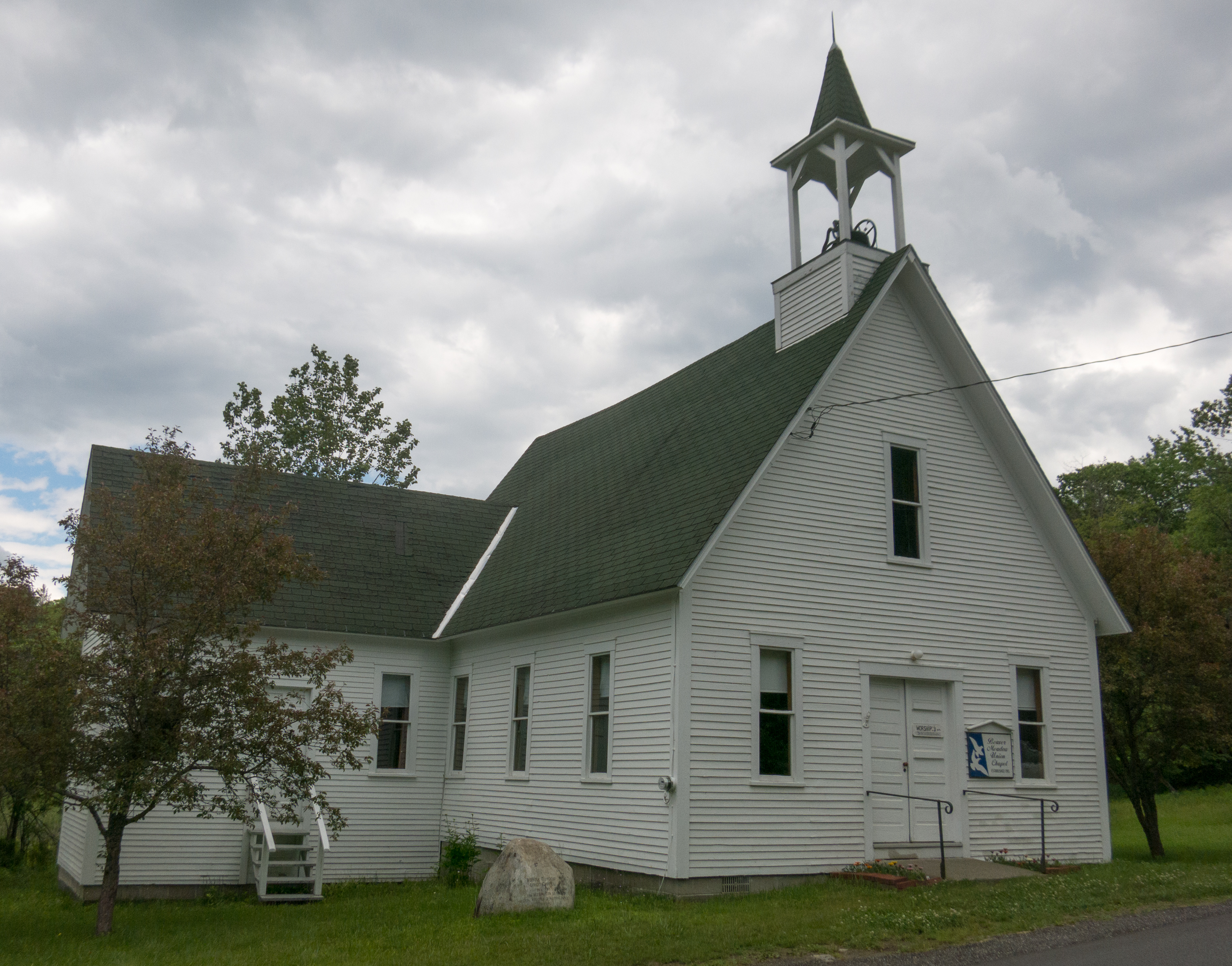
- View from Beaver Meadow Road

- Location within Vermont Location within the United States
- Location: North side of Beaver Meadow Road, Norwich, Vermont
- Coordinates: 43°45′52″N 72°22′27″W
- Area: 0.1 acres (0.040 ha)
- Built: 1915
- NRHP reference No.: 95000185
- Added to NRHP: March 09, 1995

The Beaver Meadow Union Chapel, now also known as the West Norwich Union Church, is a historic church on the north side of Beaver Meadow Road in Norwich, Vermont. Built in 1915, it is a well-preserved example of vernacular ecclesiastical architecture of the period. It is of national significance as the origin point of the Home Prayers program, essentially a mail-order ministry inspired by the catalogs of Sears, Roebuck. The building was listed on the National Register of Historic Places in 1995.

== Description and history ==
The Beaver Meadow Union Chapel stands on the north side of Beaver Meadow Road, just west of the crossroads village of West Norwich. It is a simple single-story wood-frame structure, with a steeply pitched gable roof, clapboard siding, and stone foundation. A square tower rises from the roof near the front, with an open belfry capped by a pyramidal roof. The main facade has an unadorned entrance at the center, with simply framed sash windows on either side, and above in the belfry. A kitchen ell extends to the left of the main building. The interior retains many of its original finishes and furnishings.

The church was built in 1915 at the instigation of Margaret Kerr. She was a New York City schoolteacher who agitated for its construction after a drunken brawl occurred in front of her home. The site on which it was built originally had a Methodist church on it; it had been moved to Sharon. The church was built by its future congregants, and was served by ministers operating from nearby Hanover, New Hampshire, mainly during the warmer months. One of them, Rev. Allen W. Clark, seized upon the idea of mailing written elements of a service (including lessons and sermon) to congregants in periods when the church was not in service. This idea grew into the Home Prayers program, which had more than 23,000 subscribers from 850 churches when Clark retired in 1977.

== See also ==
- National Register of Historic Places listings in Windsor County, Vermont
