= Chronology of Shakers =

The chronology of Shakers is a list of important events pertaining to the history of the Shakers, a denomination of Christianity. Millenarians who believe that their founder, Ann Lee, experienced the Second Coming of Jesus Christ, the Shakers practice celibacy, confession of sin, communalism, ecstatic worship, pacifism, and egalitarianism. This spans the emergence of denomination in the mid-18th century, the emigration of the Shakers to New York on the eve of the American Revolution, subsequent missionary work and the establishment of nineteen major planned communities, and the continued persistence of the faith through decline into the 21st century.

== Chronology ==
=== Emergence in England ===
==== Precursor movements ====
c. 1650

- George Fox initiates an English dissenter movement that becomes a denomination known as the Quakers.

1706

- Elie Marion leads a group of millenarian group of Camisards, also known as the "French Prophets", into London from France. Known for visions and prophetic sermons, their activities and writings influence the religious and political thought for many in England.

1729

- The brothers John and Charles Wesley form Holy Club, a student cell group at Christ Church, Oxford, beginning what will become known as Methodism.

==== Emergence of the Shakers ====
1736

- February 29: Ann Lees (later known as Lee) is born in Manchester, England.

1747

- Jane and James Wardley, residents of Manchester, form a house church at the residence of John Townley in Bolton, where the attendees practice ecstatic worship. Reportedly, they are former Quakers who dissent from the quietism - solemn, quietly meditative worship - in that denomination, instead desiring a more expressive form of worship. This and subsequent house churches elsewhere in Manchester, as well as in Meretown and Chester, become known as the "Wardley Society", and soon also become known as "Shaking Quakers" or "Shakers" due to the physical trembling when the congregants are overcome with religious ecstasy.

1758

- Ann Lee joins the Wardley Society.

1761

- January 5: Lee marries Abraham Standerin.

1766

- John Hocknell, after initially being drawn to Methodism, joins the Wardley Society. Around this time, the Partington family also starts hosting church meetings.

c. 1768

- John Hocknell brings his daughter, Mary, to live with Ann Lee and her brother William, in the house of their father, John Lees.

1769

- A scathing, anti-Shaker report on the Shakers, likely a reprint from an English newspaper, is published by The Virginia Gazette in the Colony of Virginia.
- In Harvard, Massachusetts, the religious leader Shadrack Ireland, and eight followers of his Perfectionist movement, build "The Square House". Ireland teaches abstinence from sex for those who have not yet achieved perfection.

c. 1770

- While in prison for "disturbing the peace", Lee receives a vision and is convicted of the need for universal celibacy among all Christians. The Shakers later believe that she experienced the Second Coming of Christ.

1772 through 1774

- By this time, the Shakers have become disruptive, and Ann Lee and others are jailed more than once.

=== Early missionary work in the United States ===
1774

- May 19: Nine Shakers emigrate from England to the Province of New York, financed by John Hocknell. These are Ann Lee, Abraham Standerin, William Lee, Nancy Lee (a niece of Ann), James Whittaker, John Hocknell, Richard Hocknell (a son of John), James Shepherd, and Mary Partington.
- August 6: The Shakers land in New York City.
- Nothing more is known of the Townleys and Wardleys after this point. They are reported to have gone bankrupt and relocated to a poor house in the summer of 1774.

1775

- John Hocknell leases property from the Manor of Rensselaerswyck, in Albany County, New York. Known as Niskayuna and later on as Watervliet (today the site is located in Colonie, New York), this becomes the first major Shaker settlement in the United States, Watervliet Shaker Village.
- Hocknell briefly returns to England in order to bring his family to Watervliet, including his second wife, Hannah, and his children Francis and Anna. The family of Mary Partington, including her father, John, also emigrate to the new community.
- Abraham Standerin renounces the Shakers and his marriage, and marries another woman.
- On April 19, the Battles of Lexington and Concord begin the American Revolutionary War.

1777

- In July, the Mohawk, Onondaga, Cayuga, and Seneca nations, who inhabit and own much of Upstate New York, including territory near the Shakers at Watervliet, declare war on the United States.

1778

- The first new members recorded as joining the Shaker community.
- Shadrack Ireland dies. His followers await for his resurrection that he predicted, but this resurrection does not occur.

1779

- "New Light" congregations of Baptists and Presbyterians in Hancock, Massachusetts and Caanan and New Lebanon, New York, experience revivals which presage the Second Great Awakening. They hold daily meetings that include extraordinary spiritual phenomena, speaking in tongues, and visions. These revivals dissipate by the end of the year.

1780

- March: Joseph Meacham and Calvin Harlow, Baptist ministers from Columbia County, New York, and leaders in the recent New Light revival, investigate the Shakers, are convinced of their message, and return with the news to their respective congregations.
- May 19: The "Dark Day", when much of the Northeast and parts of Canana are shrouded in darkness throughout the day, despite the sky being clear. On or just after this day, Lee opens her gospel to the public. Residents from Albany and Columbia Counties in Upstate New York and Berkshire County, Massachusetts, begin converting to the Shakers. The newfound popularity attracts the attention of the New York state government.
- Because of the avowed pacifism and British origin of the Shakers at a time when the American colonies are at war for independence from Britain, New York arrests and imprisons Lee and several of her followers on suspicion of espionage. They are released later that year.

1781 through 1783

- Ann and William Lee and James Whittaker, along with some of their followers, travel on an extended missionary tour of Massachusetts, Connecticut, Rhode Island, and Upstate New York, gathering converts and establishing a network of followers throughout the Northeastern United States. In several localities, mobs attack them, and the Shakers are whipped, beaten, and assaulted. The center of operations for the missionary work is the late Ireland's "Square House" in Harvard, Massachusetts, where the Shakers attract a devoted following.

1783

- September 3: Effective end of the American Revolutionary War when the Treaty of Paris is signed.

1784

- After returning to Watervliet, William Lee dies on July 21, and Ann Lee dies on September 8. Their deaths are attributed to the after-effects of the hardships and assaults they endured during their missionary tour.
- James Whittaker takes over leadership of the society.
- James Shepherd and John Partington renounce the Shakers.

=== Re-organization and institutionalization ===
1787

- James Whittaker dies, and Joseph Meacham becomes the first American-born leader of the Shakers.
- Meacham introduces the concept of communalism and begins "gathering into order" the scattered Shaker Believers, bringing them together into collectivized villages which are sub-divided into smaller communities called "families". The village organized by Meacham at New Lebanon becomes the headquarters.
- John Hocknell is appointed First Elder of Watervliet Church Family.

1788

- Joseph Meacham brings Lucy Wright, from nearby Pittsfield, Massachusetts, into the New Lebanon Ministry to serve with him as a co-leader. Together they establish an administrative structure that promotes equality of the sexes.

1790

- Shakers living at Hancock, Massachusetts, and Enfield, Connecticut are formally organized into villages.

1792

- Canterbury, New Hampshire and Tyringham, Massachusetts, Shaker villages are formally organized.

1793

- Formal organization of the Alfred, Maine, Enfield, New Hampshire, and Harvard and Shirley, Massachusetts Shaker communes.

1794

- Sabbathday Lake, Maine, Shaker village is formally organized, the next-to-last, and last 18th century, major community to be formed in the Northeast. There are now twelve Shaker communities in the United States, all in the Northeast.

1796

- Joseph Meacham dies. Lucy Wright continues as the sole primary leader for the Shakers.

1787

- October 18: Hannah Hocknell dies.

1798

- Theodore Bates, of Watervliet Shaker Village, invents the broom vice, used create broom brushes that are flat rather than rounded.

1799

- February 27: John Hocknell dies.

=== Community growth and Western expansion ===
1800

- The Second Great Awakening crosses the Appalachian Mountains when the Revival of 1800 begins in Logan County, Kentucky, at the Red River Meeting House.

1801

- Revivalism spreads to Cane Ridge, Kentucky, where the first camp meeting is held.

1805

- Wright sends John Meacham, Benjamin Youngs, and Issachar Bates to proselytize in Ohio and Kentucky, having heard of the revivals in those states. The mission is a success, and Union Village is organized in Ohio.

1806

- Shaker converts are organized into the villages of Watervliet, Ohio, and Pleasant Hill, Kentucky.

1807

- Shaker villages organized at South Union, Kentucky, and Busro, Indiana. The latter village becomes known as West Union.
- James Shepherd returns to Watervliet and is placed in the order established for members who have left the faith but then returned.

1808

- A village is established at Gorham, Maine.

1810

- A Shaker community is attempted at New Canaan, Connecticut.

1811

- Conflicts between the United States and Tecumseh's Confederacy result in multiple raids from both the United States and the Confederacy on West Union Shaker Village.
- Prime Lane, a black man who joined Watervliet Shaker village with his two daughters in 1802 and later, in 1810, renounced the faith, sues for custody of his daughters, arguing that they are his slaves. The New York State Court of Appeals rules that the daughters, Phebe and Betty, are free to choose whether to stay with the Shakers or with Lane. They choose to remain at Watervliet. Prime and Hannah Lane then attempt to remove Betty by force, but fail to do so.
- December 16: The first of the New Madrid earthquakes and its aftershock inflicts minimal damage to West Union.

1812

- January 23: The second of the New Madrid earthquakes.
- February 7: The third of the New Madrid earthquakes. While the earthquakes themselves only slightly damage West Union, they induce flooding of the Wabash River on which the community is situated. The resulting wet floodplains and swamps ground breed malaria and other insect-born diseases.
- The first written collection of Shaker hymns, Millennial Praises, is published.
- The attempt to form a commune at New Canaan is abandoned. Enfield remains the only Shaker community in Connecticut.
- June 18: the War of 1812 breaks out between the United States and the United Kingdom and their respective allies.
- September 1812: the Shaker community at West Union, Indiana, in order to escape the turmoil of the war, is temporarily disbanded and its membership takes shelter in the Ohio and Kentucky villages.
- A branch of the New Lebanon Shaker Village, consisting of two families, is established in Canaan, New York.

1814

- March 1814: Shakers start returning to West Union, Indiana.

1815

- Mary Dyer renounces the Shakers and attempts to regain custody of her children, whom she had signed over to the community.
- February 7: The New York State Legislature takes up the case of Eunice Chapman, who seeks a divorce and custody of her children after her husband, James Chapman, joined the Shakers at Watervliet and secretly took their children into the community.
- February 17: Ratification of the Treaty of Ghent, officially ending the War of 1812.

1816

- The first major Shaker writing, and their official biography of Ann Lee, Testimonies of the Life, Character, Revelations and Doctrines of our Ever Blessed Mother Ann Lee, is published.
- February 16: After the failure of her previous petition, Chapman appeals to the New York legislature to grant her a legislative divorce rather than one obtained through the court.

1817

- February 20, 1817: In response to the controversy over Eunice Chapman and her children, the Ministry led by Lucy Wright issues an order to no longer take in a potential convert if they are married and their spouse does not wish to also join.
- A Shaker village is formed at Savoy, Massachusetts. The number of Shaker villages in Massachusetts (of which Maine is a part) now reaches its highest point, with eight communities.
- A non-violent "Shaker slave revolt" occurs at South Union, Kentucky. Although the Shakers hold to equality and egalitarianism as an ideal, and numerous enslaved peoples were liberated once their legal owners joined South Union or other Shaker villages, many black members of South Union were still legally enslaved to Shakers who joined with them as their legal property and had yet to release them.

1818

- March 14: Eunice Chapman is finally granted relief from her marriage and given custody of her children. The law also grants a spouse of either gender whose partner has joined the Shakers the right to request custody of any underage children. The Shakers are also prohibited from transporting children across state lines.
- May 9: Chapman travels to Enfield Village in New Hampshire where her children are held by the Shakers. Aided by mobs and fellow anti-Shaker activist Mary Dyer, she eventually obtains her son, George, and returns to Albany by June 3.
- Dyer publishes A brief statement of the sufferings of Mary Dyer occasioned by the society called Shakers, an anti-Shaker work that further publicizes her custody dispute with the Enfield Shakers.

1819

- The Shaker community at Gorham is dissolved and its members relocated to Poland, Maine, where they reform into Poland Hill, a branch of the nearby Sabbathday Lake Shaker Village. The number of Shaker villages in Massachusetts is reduced from eight to seven.
- The two remaining children of Eunice Chapman held at Enfield, New Hampshire are returned to Chapman.
- Mary Dyer raises a mob to reclaim her children from Enfield, but this effort fails.
- South Union and Pleasant Hill, Kentucky, officially begin a program of manumission for any remaining enslaved members within their villages.

1820

- Maine, after long-standing disagreements with, and growing secessionist sentiment against, Massachusetts, breaks away from Massachusetts to become its own sovereign state as part of the Missouri Compromise. This reduces the total number of Shaker villages in Massachusetts from seven to five, as Alfred and Sabbathday Lake Villages are now in a separate state.

1821

- Lucy Wright dies.
- The Shakers codify their rules for the first time as the Millennial Laws of 1821.
- The Shaker community at Savoy is disbanded and the membership relocated to New Lebanon, New York and Hancock, Massachusetts. The number of Shaker communities in Massachusetts now totals four.

1822

- The final two Shaker communities in Ohio are formed: North Union and Whitewater, bringing the total number of Shaker communities in Ohio to five. The seventeenth and eighteenth communities overall, these are the last Shaker communities established in the Midwestern United States.
- Shakers start gathering at Darby Plains, Ohio.
- Mary Dyer releases a second anti-Shaker book, A portraiture of Shakerism.

1823

- The Shakers at Darby Plains abandon their attempts to form a community there and instead relocate to Whitewater.

1825

- April 14: Mary Hocknell, a daughter of John Hocknell, dies.

1826

- A Shaker village formed at Sodus Bay, New York, bringing the total number of Shaker village in New York to its highest point of three communities.

1827

- West Union, Indiana, is dissolved after years of continued trouble with external conflict from non-Shaker neighbors, internal disputes, and disease. It never fully recovered from the ravages of Tecumseh's War, the earthquake-induced floods and resulting fevers, and the War of 1812. It is the first major Shaker community to permanently disband, and the only major community to do so before 1875. Its closure also marks the end of any significant Shaker presence in the state of Indiana.

c. 1830

- The program of manumission of enslaved persons at South Union is completed.

1833

- September 10: Mary Partington, the last living and faithful member of the first band of nine English Shakers to arrive in America, dies.

1836

- The Sodus Bay Shaker community, dismayed at a proposal by New York State to build a canal near the village, is dissolved and relocated to Groveland, New York. Groveland is the last of nineteen major Shaker communities to be established. The net total of Shaker communities in New York remains at three, and the total number of existing Shaker communities in the country is eighteen.

=== Era of Manifestations ===
1837

- Beginning of the Era of Manifestations

1841

- Francis Hocknell, son of John Hocknell and one of the original English Shakers who emigrated in the second voyage from England, dies at New Lebanon.

1842

- Shaker meetings are temporarily closed to the public due to fear of ridicule and harassment by non-Shakers
- The first outdoor ritual "feast" is held by the New Lebanon Shakers, a ritual which is then ordered for all the societies.

1843

- The Sacred and Divine Roll and Book, a series of special divine revelations received by Philemon Stewart, is published.

1844

- The creation of sacred "feasting grounds" which started in 1842 is complete in all societies. All active villages except for Pleasant Hill, Kentucky, have received a spiritual name.

1845

- The Ministry consolidates and codifies previous collections of rules received in the Shaker orders through divine inspiration into an extensive revision of The Millennial Laws.

1847

- Anna Hocknell, daughter of John and sister to Francis, and the last of the original English Shakers and of the "First Parents", dies at New Lebanon. Her death marks the end of the last memories of the Shaker origins in England.

1848

- The song "Simple Gifts" is composed. The Shakers attribute the song variously to a "Negro spirit" from Canterbury Shaker Village or, more commonly, to Elder Joseph Brackett from Alfred Shaker Village.

=== Civil War era ===
1859

- A small Shaker community is founded in Philadelphia, Pennsylvania by Rebecca Cox Jackson and Rebecca Perot from Watervliet Shaker Village. Both women are black, and oversee an integrated, majority black Shaker population. The total number of Shaker communities nation-wide is now nineteen.

1860

- A revision to the 1845 Millennial Laws is published, repealing many of the more exacting regulations.

1861

- April 12: The American Civil War begins.
- The societies in Kentucky begin experiencing severe hardship as passing armies requisition food, resources, and lodging, as well as additional loss through theft and fire. This hardship will continue throughout the course of the war.

1862

- Benjamin Gates and Frederick W. Evans visit Abraham Lincoln in order to have a young Shaker man be exempted from military draft and receive instructions for how other Shakers can legally avoid military service.

1865

- May—June: The American Civil War ends.

=== Post-Civil War decline ===
1871

- Frederick W. Evans travels to England, his place of birth, on a missionary tour. A handful of converts return with him to the United States.
- Shaker, a Shaker-run newspaper and newsletter, is launched in Watervliet.

1872

- The Shakers hold and participate in public meetings, often with other, non-Shaker spiritualists, throughout the country.

1875

- Tyringham Shaker Village is closed down after 83 years of operation. It is the first major closure of a Shaker settlement since West Union, Indiana in 1827. It signals the dramatic decline in Shaker population and the closure of most villages in the coming decades.
- Charles Nordhoff publishes The Communistic Societies of the United States, which contains over 140 pages detailing the Shakers.

1889

- North Union Shaker Village is permanently closed down after 67 year of operation.

1890

- A few Shakers attempt to start communities at San Diego and San Francisco, California.
- Shaker writer and publisher Giles Bushnell Avery of Mount Lebanon, at this point the de facto head of Shakerism, dies. Joseph Holden takes his place.

1892

- Groveland Shaker Village is permanently closed down after 56 years of operation.

1895

- Shakers from New Lebanon establish a new Shaker colony in Narcoossee, Florida.

1896

- The Shaker community in Philadelphia is officially disbanded after 37 years of operation when Rebbeca Jackson Perot and 3 others are relocated to the West Family at Watervliet. However, some Shakers remain in the city.

1898

- The Shakers at Union Village attempt to establish a new Shaker community based in White Oak, Georgia.

1899

- The Shaker Manifesto, the final title of the newspaper started in 1871, ceases publication.

=== Decline in the 20th century ===
1900

- Watervliet, Ohio, Shaker Village is disbanded after 94 years of operation..

1902

- The Shakers abandon their attempts to settle at White Oak.

1906

- 1906 San Francisco earthquake. After the earthquake and resultant fires, the Shakers in California disappear from record.

1908

- Shirley Shaker Village closes down after 115 years of operation.
- The last recorded mention of the Shakers living in Philadelphia, 49 years after the community was founded there.

1910

- Pleasant Hill closes down after 105 years of operation.

1912

- Union Shaker Village closes down after 107 years of operation.

1916

- White Water Shaker Village is closed down after 94 years of operation.

1917

- Enfield, Connecticut, Shaker Village closes down after 127 years of operation.

1918

- Harvard Shaker Village closes down after 127 years of operation.

1922

- South Union Shaker Village, the last extant community of Western Shakers, closes down after 115 years of operation.

1923

- Enfield, New Hampshire, Shaker Village closes down after 130 years of operation.

1924

- The Narcoossee, Florida Shaker Village closes down after 29 years of operation.

1931

- Alfred Shaker Village is closed down after 138 years of operation.

1938

- Watervliet Shaker Village, the first community established by the Shakers, is closed after 162 years of operation.

1947

- Mount Lebanon, the headquarters for all Shakers since 1787, is closed after 160 years of operation and the Shaker Ministry transferred to Hancock Shaker Village.

=== Revival and schism ===
1960

- Theodore "Ted" Johnson arrives at Sabbathday Lake Shaker Village.
- Hancock Shaker Village closes after 170 years of operation.

1961

- Ted Johnson and Mildred Barker launch The Shaker Quarterly, a journal and newsletter about the Shakers.

1963

- Emma King of Canterbury Shaker Village issues an epistle stating that the community would no longer accept members.

1965

- Emma King of Canterbury Shaker Village and Gertrude Soule of Sabbathday Lake Shaker Village decide to close the Society to new members. This begins a rift within the current membership as not all agree with this decision. The impetus for closure, and the ensuing feud is possibly in part due to the controversial presence of Ted Johnson at Sabbathday Lake.

1971

- Gertrude Soule leaves Sabbathday Lake to join the Canterbury Village. Mildred Barker, technically a trustee of the community, becomes the de facto spiritual leader for Sabbathday Lake. The schism among the Shakers, now represented by Canterbury on one side of the dispute and Sabbathday Lake on the other, is irreparable.

1975

- The Shaker Quarterly suspends publication.

1978

- Arnold Hadd joins Sabbathday Lake Shaker Village.

1986

- The Shaker Quarterly resumes publication

1990

- Mildred Barker at Sabbathday Lake dies, as does Bertha Lindsay of Canterbury. The death of the latter leaves one surviving member at Canterbury, Ethel Hudson.

1992

- Canterbury Shaker Village closes after 200 years of operation when Ethel Hudson dies.

=== The last community ===
1996

- The Shaker Quarterly ceases publication

2006

- Wayne Smith leaves the Shakers after 26 years among them to marry Stacey Chase, whom he met when she visited the village as a reporter.

2017

- Francis Carr, who joined the Shakers in 1937 at age ten, dies at age 89.

2025

- April Baxter is admitted as a member to the Shakers at the Sabbathday Lake community, bringing the total to 3.
