= Job Bishop =

American Christian leader (1760–1831)

Father Job Bishop

Personal details
- Born: September 29, 1760 Stamford, Connecticut, United States
- Died: December 5, 1831 (aged 70) Canterbury Shaker Village, New Hampshire, United States
- Relations: Ebenezer Bishop (brother); Rufus Bishop (brother)
- Occupation: Religious leader, Shaker community founder, missionary, and furniture maker

Job Bishop (/dʒoʊb/ JOHB; September 29, 1760 – 1831) was an American early Shaker leader. A missionary, he founded the Shaker communities of Canterbury, New Hampshire, and Enfield, New Hampshire.

== Biography ==
=== Early life ===
Bishop was born on September 29, 1760, in Stamford, Connecticut, United States. In 1779, according to Shaker Elder Henry C. Blinn, Bishop became interested in a "religious revival", just around a decade before the beginning of the Second Great Awakening. He later recorded an account of his experiences and conversion to Shakerism, writing:

"I entered fully into the spirit of the work and received great light. Although zealous prayers and religious exercises often had the effect to produce spiritual impressions, yet they were not permanent, and left me a subject to temptations. We passed the winter exhorting each other to faithfulness, while we anxiously waited for the accomplishment of the prophetic spirit of the revival.

In the spring of 1780 we learned of a people near the city of Albany, NY, who were reported to have received a singular kind of religion, and that they possessed a large degree of divine light and spiritual power. Many went out to see them and returned fully persuaded that they were the true witnesses of God. The work increased and I felt a great desire to satisfy myself concerning these strangers and their religion.

In June, in company with several others, I made them a visit. We arrived on Saturday evening and remained till Monday. We attended their meetings. The singing was inspiring, the speaking powerful and heart-searching. The wisdom of their instruction, the purity of their doctrine, and the Christ-like simplicity of their deportment all reminded me of the apostolic faith. I saw that the work was of God, and my salvation depended upon it.

The cross that was before me was an evidence of the spirit of the testimony. On the one hand, the prospects of the world were flattering to my mind. I was in the prime of life and in the vigor of health. My reputation was fair, and my hopes not unpromising.

On the other hand, religion had been my pursuit. The revival had raised my hopes and directed my faith to a greater and more glorious work. I subsequently made another visit and was received with kindness. I confessed my sins to God, and with a fixed resolution accepted the cross of Christ. I was now taught to rectify every wrong that I had committed, to forsake all sin and to take up a daily cross. "

I also became better acquainted with Mother Ann and the Elders who were with her, and am a witness of the purity of life which they constantly maintained. The doctrine they taught was strictly conformable to the precepts and example of Jesus Christ. By obeying their instruction I experienced the truth of their testimony. I was blessed with heavenly visions and felt my faith established on a sure foundation.

I visited Mother Ann and the Elders many times at Watervliet, Harvard, Ashfield, Hancock, and New Lebanon, and freely associated with all the leading members of the Society. To my great satisfaction I have seen that the principles which were first taught by Mother Ann have been faithfully kept by her successors."

=== Early ministry ===
Many members of the Bishop family became Shakers, joining the Mount Lebanon Shaker Society in New York at its founding in 1787, later becoming very influential in its leadership. In the late 1780s, Bishop was part of a group of young men and women chosen by Father Joseph Meacham, third leader of the Shakers, to be the future leaders of the religion. In 1788, he moved to the Mount Lebanon to assist Father Meacham. The young Bishop was described at the time in The Shaker Manifesto as:

Erect and well proportioned, being about five feet and ten inches in hight [sic]. His hair was dark chestnut and very strait , [sic] his nose of the Roman type and his eyes a brilliant black. His voice in speaking was keyed higher than is usual for men and yet those who listened to the power and spirit of his exhortations soon learned that he was a living servant of God. He was remarkably gifted and endowed with the prophetic spirit in an eminent degree.

Between 1782 and 1791, Bishop was tasked, among others, with visiting the New Hampshire Shakers to serve as a minister. It was anticipated that the task of organizing into communities the Shakers in that state would be given to Elder Henry Clough. Clough was originally commissioned to organize the new Hampshire communities in 1788, but Father Joseph Meacham, leader of the Shakers, reversed his decision, deciding that Clough was more valuable back at Mount Lebanon Shaker Society. Clough returned to Mount Lebanon and became Father Meacham's second-in-command.

=== Leadership in New Hampshire ===
In 1791, Bishop was sent to New Hampshire to gather the Shakers there into "Gospel order", a Quaker/Shaker term referring to communal harmony. He facing difficulty doing so, however, and returned to Mount Lebanon, depressed and seeking guidance. Father Meacham sent him to meet with Elder Clough, who assured Bishop that he was the right man for the job, and that he himself (Clough) was needed more at the Mount Lebanon. Bishop accepted Clough's counseling, and Father Meacham allowed Clough to accompany Bishop on his next trip. On the road, Bishop again became depressed, falling behind Clough on the trail. Clough comforted him yet again, saying:

"Go, Job, you will have a gift in your ministration. I will return."

Clough turned around and headed back to Mount Lebanon, while Bishop continued the journey alone. Later that year, after his initial success in instilling "Gospel order", Bishop would be given leadership of the New Hampshire Shakers. In February 1792, Bishop, along with Brother Edward Lougee and Sisters Hannah Goodrich and Anna Burdick, was sent from the Mount Lebanon community the Central Ministry of the Shakers to be the first "Lead", or leader, of the new Canterbury Shaker Village. He was young at the time, in his late 20s, but was chosen because Meacham appreciated, according to Brother John Ward, a member of the Shakers' Harvard community, that:

"[Job Bishop] was always very careful to acknowledge the lead placed before him whether young or old, and in a peculiar manner was extremely careful to pattern the gift and order of things in the Mother Church."

Still, sources indicate his promotion to such a leadership position was controversial. Some Shakers still believed that Elder Clough would have been a better choice to lead the New Hampshire communities. Bishop himself experienced doubts, but was able to continue with his mission.

Bishop reached Canterbury, New Hampshire and organized the community there during 1792. Bishop remained in New Hampshire after establishing the Canterbury Society, and less than a year later, organized the Enfield community. He remained in New Hampshire long thereafter, residing at the Canterbury or Enfield community. In addition to his leadership, Bishop was also a prolific craftsman, specializing in chair and cabinetmaking. Several of his wooden circular boxes are currently featured in a collection of Shaker furniture and crafts at the Philadelphia Museum of Art.

=== Later life and death ===
In 1795, Bishop was conferred upon the title of "Father", which designates the highest rank of leadership in the Shaker Church.

One of Bishop's best remembered moments was his greeting of United States President James Monroe on the occasion of the President's 1817 visit to the Enfield Society during his tour of New England. Bishop, in a famed example of what was considered the Shakers' "characteristic" style of speech, received the President with the simple words:

"I, Job Bishop, welcome James Monroe to our habitation."

Bishop died on December 5, 1831, in Canterbury Shaker Village, aged 72 years, two months, and six days. He was the last survivor of the original leaders sent out by Father Meacham in 1792, having served the Shakers of New Hampshire for over 40 years.
