= Giles Bushnell Avery =

Shaker leader and writer

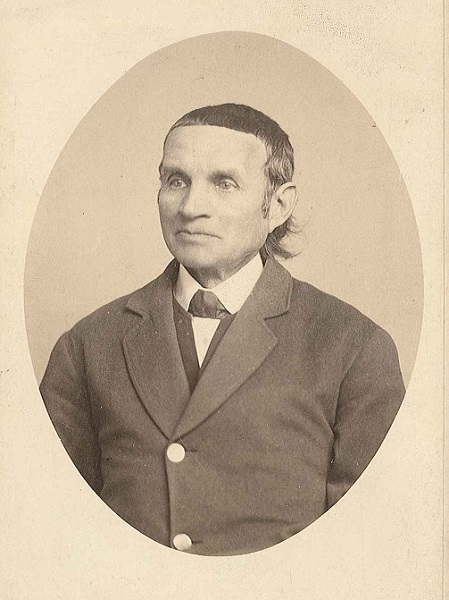
- Born: November 3, 1815; Saybrook, Connecticut
- Died: 1890 (aged 74–75); Watervliet Shaker Historic District, Colonie, New York
- Occupations: Writer, publisher, gardener, carpenter, schoolteacher
- Parent(s): Gilbert Avery, Sophie Bushnell

Religious life
- Religion: Christianity
- Denomination: Shaker

Giles Bushnell Avery (November 3, 1815 – 1890) was a Shaker writer, publisher, gardener, carpenter, and schoolteacher from New Lebanon Shaker Society. Shaker scholar Stephen J. Paterwic considered him the "de facto head of Shakerism" at the time of his death, adding, "If one single person could be chosen whose life epitomized that of the ideal Shaker leader, then that soul would be Giles Avery."

== Biography ==
Avery was born November 3, 1815, in Saybrook, Connecticut, to Gilbert and Sophia Avery (née Bushnell). In 1819, his family moved to New Lebanon, New York, at the suggestion of Giles' uncle to join the Shaker faith. In 1821, he moved from the Lower Canaan Family to the Church Family Second Order. He attended school there, and eventually helped to watch the schoolchildren. During the 1830s, he worked as a caretaker, gardener, and nurseryman.

At 25, Avery was appointed to the Order of Elders at New Lebanon, assisting Elder Amos Stewart. He was often tasked with manual labor, such as cutting and laying stone and carpentering, as well as transcribing manuscripts. He spent 20 years in this role before, in 1859, becoming a part of the Ministry, a role he remained in until his death. For some years during this time, he published and wrote numerous articles for the Shaker periodical The Manifesto.

Avery died in 1890 while visiting Watervliet Shaker Village. Elder Isaac Anstatt travelled to New Lebanon and Hancock Shaker Village to tell the Shakers there. Despite heavy snowfall, two sleighloads carrying 12 people and 8 people came from New Lebanon and Hancock, respectively, for his funeral. He was buried in Watervliet Shaker Cemetery.

== Religious views ==
In following the Shaker faith among other Shakers at New Lebanon, Avery appreciated seeing the struggle for salvation and the teachings of the faith directly reflected on the daily lives and character of those around him. During the Era of Manifestations, he claims one night to have seen Daniel at the top of a mountain, who lectured him for two hours on human history, wisdom, and virtue. During that time he also claims to have seen visions of saints, been used as a medium through which a saint spoke, and to have been lifted above the Earth where he saw Joseph Meacham, an early Shaker leader.

== Selected bibliography ==
- Avery, Giles B. & White, Anna (1891). Autobiography by Elder Giles B. Avery, of Mount Lebanon, N.Y. Also An Account of the Funeral Service which was Held at Watervliet, N.Y., December 30, 1890; Together with testimonials of respect from his Many Friends. East Canterbury, N.H..
- Avery, Giles B. (1883) Sketches of "Shakers and Shakerism." Synopsis of Theology of United Society of Believers in Christ's Second Appearing. Albany, NY: Weed, Parsons and Company, Printers.
