= M. Catherine Allen =

1851–1922, Shaker eldress

Minnie Catherine Allen
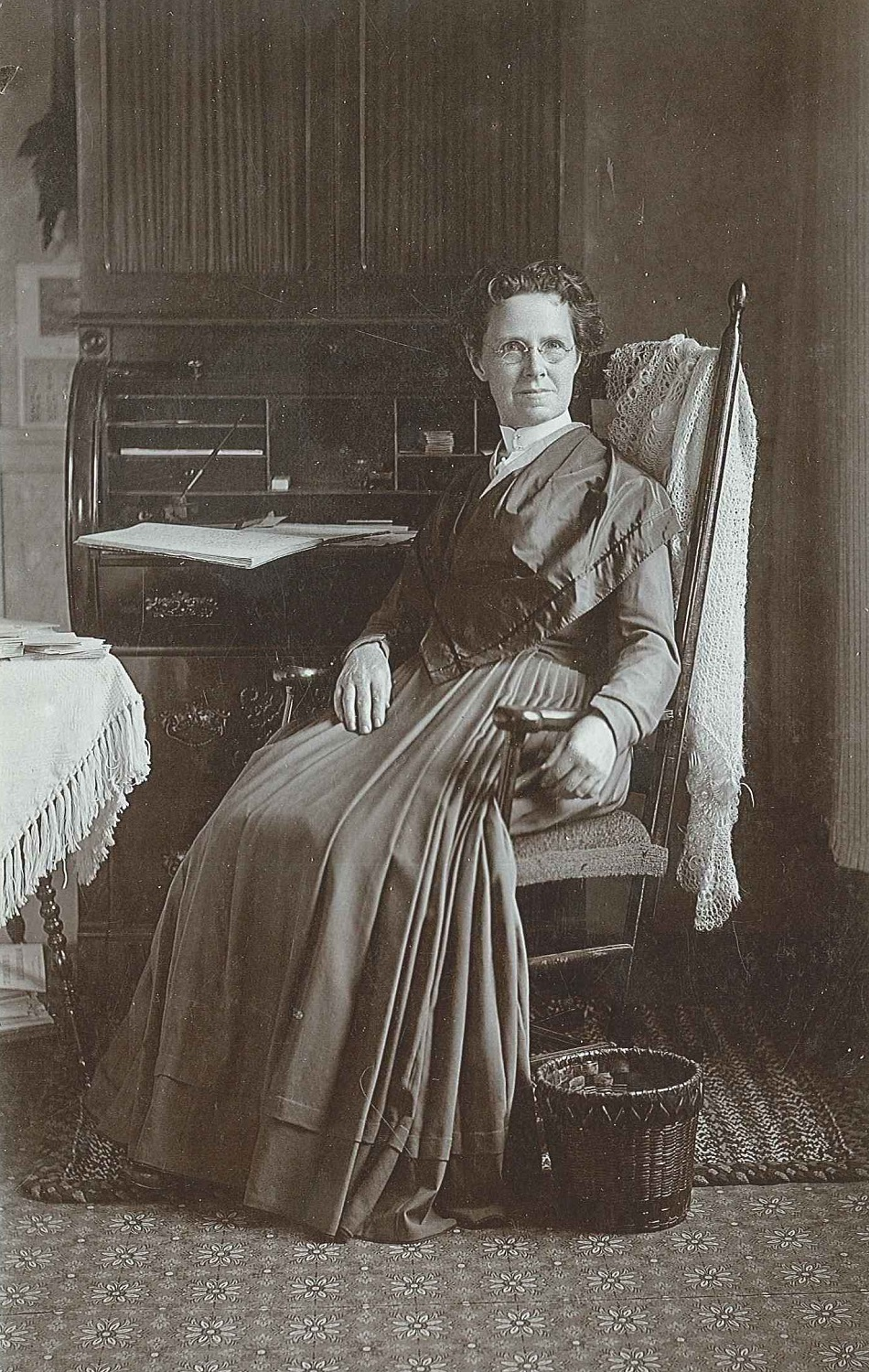
- Portrait of M. Catherine Allen, between c. 1898 and c. 1908
- Born: Catherine Allen; September 3, 1851; Patriot, Indiana, U.S.
- Died: June 5, 1922 (aged 70); Mount Lebanon Shaker Society, New Lebanon, New York, U.S.
- Occupations: Minister, theologian, manager, suffragist, preservationist, historian
- Notable work: A Full Century of Communism, The History of the Alethians, formally called Shakers
- Parents: John Allen (father); Ellen Lazarus (mother)
- Title: First Eldress

Religious life
- Religion: Christianity
- Denomination: Shaker

Senior posting
- Based in: Mount Lebanon Shaker Society
- Post: First Eldress of the Lead Ministry
- Period in office: 1908-1922
- Predecessor: Helen Augusta Stone
- Successor: Sarah Burger

Minnie Catherine Allen (September 3, 1851 – June 5, 1922) was a leader among the Shakers, active as a historian and activist as well as a member of the Central Shaker Ministry.

== Biography ==
Catherine Allen was born in Patriot, Indiana, to a clergyman, John Allen, and his wife, Ellen Lazarus, daughter of Rachel Mordecai Lazarus. The couple were perpetual joiners of communal societies, and had previously been members of Brook Farm in Massachusetts; at the time of Minnie's birth they were living at a similar community in Terre Haute, Indiana, which had been financed by Emma. This, too, failed, and the family moved again, to join the Utopian Community of Modern Times in New York. From here, she and her brother were sent to board with the Shakers, where they lived with the North Family of the Mount Lebanon Shaker Society. The arrangement had been intended as temporary, but Minnie was so interested in the community's way of life that she elected to join, a decision which displeased her mother greatly. Anna White had just been named second eldress of the family, and Minnie Allen became the first girl she raised, leading to a lifelong friendship. Minnie soon began using her middle name exclusively, in a symbolic break with her former life. Her intelligence was immediately noted by other members of the community.

Allen soon gained a reputation as an outspoken supporter of the rights of women and animals and of women's suffrage, a role somewhat at odds with the Shakers' traditionally more reticent values. She began to write for the Manifesto; some of these articles found a greater currency, and were distributed beyond the boundaries of the community. She was in charge as well of managing visitors to the North Family, and managed the community's store as well. She received her teaching certificate in 1891, and influenced other sisters with her curriculum choices. In 1897 she published A Full Century of Communism, The History of the Alethians, formally called Shakers, designed to explain the basic principles of Shaker life to a wider audience.

In 1908, she was chosen to succeed Eldress Helen Augusta Stone, who had recently died, in the Central Shaker Ministry; it was the first time a member from the ranks had gone directly to that organization. Her companion in the Ministry, Harriet Bullard, was 84 years old at Allen's accession, and resigned six years later, leaving the younger woman as first eldress. Active in closing out societies that were no longer viable, she expended great energy in attempting to save Shaker documents, ensuring that many were sent to libraries near former Shaker communities. She also established a partnership with Wallace Cathcart and the Western Reserve Historical Society, leading to the preservation of some 10,000 items and making the Society a major repository of Shaker material culture.

Allen continued to be active in political matters, attending a meeting of the International Council of Women in Toledo, Ohio and spearheading a petition drive for women's suffrage. She had intended to reinvigorate the Shaker movement when she took office, but she soon came to believe that many of the surviving members had lost interest, and felt that it could not be revitalized. Consequently, she helped to refocus the Ministry's efforts into the area of financial oversight, ensuring that valuable assets were not lost when their owners chose to return to secular life. Ultimately, eight of the eighteen major Shaker communities closed during her tenure. After her service with the Ministry finished she returned to the North Family, dying there, aged 70, after a seven-month bout with cancer. Her philosophy and ideas continued to influence the Shaker movement for much of the next sixty years.

One of Allen's dresses survives and has been exhibited with other Shaker textiles and items of clothing. In recognition of her preservation efforts, her name and image grace the bookplate used by the Shaker Literature and Manuscript Collection at the Western Reserve Historical Library.
