= West Union (Busro), Indiana =

Shaker settlement in Indiana

Coordinates: 38°53′57″N 87°29′41″W

West Union (Busro) is an abandoned Shaker community in Busseron Township, northwestern Knox County, Indiana, about fifteen miles (24 km) north of Vincennes. The settlement was inhabited by the Shakers (United Society of Believers in Christ's Second Appearing) from 1811 to 1827. Though short-lived, West Union was the westernmost Shaker settlement.

== Founding and early history ==
By 1808, the Shaker communities in New England and New York were on a firm foundation. Seeking to take advantage of the rising tide of religious fervor on the trans-Appalachian frontier, particularly the Cane Ridge Revival in Kentucky, the Shaker lead ministry at Watervliet and Mount Lebanon in New York sent Issachar Bates, Benjamin Seth Youngs, and John Meacham west to spread knowledge about the Shaker faith. These early Shaker missionaries walked 1,200 miles (1,900 km) on foot into the "West" to "open the Gospel" in the Ohio Valley. The new faith soon attracted enough converts to open fresh communities in Kentucky and Ohio, including Pleasant Hill in Mercer County, Kentucky, South Union in Logan County, Kentucky, and Union Village, near Dayton, Ohio.

While the Shakers' unique ideas about communal ownership of property, sexual equality, celibacy, and economic cooperation appealed to many new settlers driven by religious fervor and the harshness of life on the frontier, their initial reception by some frontiersmen was not auspicious. Fearing that celibate utopians would break up families and compete with established churches, when Issachar Bates and fellow Shaker missionaries came to Indiana around 1809, a few settlers there resorted to violence to keep them away. Bates recalled that on his second trip to the Wabash Valley:

a mob of 12 men on horseback came upon us with ropes to bind us, headed by [one] John Thompson. He stepped up to me and said, come prepare yourselves to move. – Move where? said I – Out of this country, said he, for you have ruined a fine neighborhood and now we intend to fix you – Your hats are too big, and we shall take off part of them, and your coats are too long, we shall take off part of them, and seeing you will have nothing to do with women, we shall fix you so that you cannot perform.

The pacifist Bates (a former Revolutionary soldier and "merry singer of ballad tales") exchanged witty banter with Thompson, but barely avoided being tied to a horse and thrown out of the area, although Thompson rode off with a death threat against the Shakers. According to some sources, Bates eventually walked 38,000 miles (61,000 km) in eleven years and converted 1100 people across Ohio, Kentucky, and Indiana to the Shaker faith. Bates wrote a lengthy ballad hymn about his trip to Busro in 1809 and also wrote the following in his autobiography:

I have now literally run, a long crooked road - from the year 1801 till the year 1811. I traveled most of it on foot...In all this time I have had a good conscience for I know that I never have wronged any of my persecutors and that has been my comfort & peace. I have been filled with joy & comfort whenever I visited the different Societies where they had honestly taken up their crosses; to see them filled with the power & gifts of God. This made ample amends for all my persecution.

In 1809, a large group of recent converts from Union Village, near Dayton, Ohio, many of them free African Americans, loaded their property onto keel boats and pirogues and headed down the Ohio River, bound for a new settlement at "Big Prairy," on Busseron Creek, fifteen miles (24 km) north of Fort Knox at Vincennes, Indiana Territory. French boatmen helped them navigate the river. Their livestock was driven overland from the Falls of the Ohio at Clarksville. By the summer of 1811, around 300 Shakers were established at the settlement they called Busro (after Busseron Creek). Officially, it was identified as "West Union." Shakers had also come to Indiana from Red Banks, Kentucky, and the failed Shaker communities at Eagle Creek and Straight Creek in Ohio.

Shaker diarist Samuel Swan McClelland, whose account runs until 1827, notes that among the first buildings constructed was "One hewed-log house... with 4 rooms, and all things seemed to be going well for the present." A map by the Shaker cartographer Richard McNemar, drawn in the 1820s, shows that at its height, West Union contained 1,300 acres (5.3 km^{2}) of land, "400 well improved." A two-story brick house "50 by 45," with "14 rooms and cellar" served as the Center Family House. Surrounding the house sat a "kitchen, doctor shop, skin shop, weave shop, wash house [and] smoke house." A "great frame meetinghouse two story 50 by 40" sat across from it. The North Family House stood nearby, "30 by 21 two story and a cellar." Several barns and two apple orchards were on the property (one orchard had 400 trees, the other had 700.) A sawmill, grist mill, and fulling mill stood along Busseron Creek, with another mill seven miles (11 km) distant, across the Wabash River in Illinois. In the barnyard could be found "threshing and flax machines."

McClelland's diary entries show the surprising ethnic diversity of Busro, where many of the Shakers were free blacks. In the summer of 1811, he wrote: "About the first week in June some few were taken sick with fevers, and on the 19th, Anthony Tann a colored man departed this life, having Peggy his wife a white woman and 6 children among the believers. This was the first death that occurred after the Eagle Creek people were settled on Prairy."

A number of the Shakers who settled here had also been Revolutionary War veterans.

== Early hardships ==
Anthony Tann's death from fever was the first in a series of misfortunes to strike Busro in its early years and cripple it from its birth. These misfortunes would eventually preoccupy Samuel Swan McClelland's diary, which from 1811 until its last entries in 1827, quickly became a disaster narrative.

=== War of 1812 ===
The Shakers soon discovered that they had built West Union on an Indian trail and war path, the traditional route of communication with (and attack against) white settlement at Vincennes. During the summer of 1811, rumors of an impending Indian war began to frighten residents of the Wabash Valley. (When international hostilities finally broke out, it was known as the War of 1812, though fighting between Native Americans and settlers had begun earlier.) In August, 1811, William Henry Harrison, the Indiana Territory's military governor, met with the Shawnee leader Tecumseh at Vincennes, but according to McClellan, "the Indians went away about as ill humor'd as they came."

In September 1811, Native Americans (probably Shawnee) stole four of the Shakers’ "best waggon horses, the team that was hauling timber at the mill." When the owners found out what direction they had gone, "James Brownfield the waggoner, and Abraham Jones, a colored man, and a linguist with a hired man by the name of Robins started with two horses to follow them, and get the horses on peaceable terms if they could." The Shakers took no firearms with them and were not looking for a fight. After traveling for two and a half days, they overtook the Shawnee, but could not convince them to hand over the stolen horses. The horse thieves "would not talk much but appeared to be mad, and were very busy fixing their guns." The two Shakers and their interpreter then snatched the horses and ran, "as quick as possible, each man having 2 horses to take care of. After they had got about 2 miles they discovered the Indians coming after them with speed." The men fled for their lives. "After running some 7 or 8 miles through a long Prairy," the exhausted horses had to be left behind, with the men's "saddles, saddles bags, blankets, big coats and provision."

Having a kind of swamp to cross before [the men] could find any chance of hiding themselves... they being so far done out, they could hardly get their feet out of the mud. The Indians got close enough to fire on them... The mud in the swamp robbed them of their shoes, and in their extreme haste to save their lives, they somehow lost their hats. After six days’ hard fatigue they got home pretty well famished, and almost naked by the action of the brush and briars on their few remaining clothes. We were then compelled to sustain the loss of six horses, besides all disappointments.

En route to the Shawnee stronghold at Prophetstown farther up the Wabash in the autumn of 1811, where he narrowly defeated a Native American confederacy at the Battle of Tippecanoe, Harrison's army of 1400 men left Vincennes and "encamped on Snaps Prairy about 1 mile from our meeting house." Harrison's soldiers pillaged the Shakers' crops, confiscating wagons and horses to take north with them. "Our affliction on this occasion cannot be easily described," remarked McClellan. "However in a few days they marched on up the Wabash and on the 7 November the battle of Tippecanoe was fought. After which they soon returned, with many wounded and all greatly fatigued. We gave them all the comfortable usage we could, and they went on to Vincennes."

=== New Madrid earthquakes ===
In the winter of 1811, the New Madrid Seismic Zone, centered in southeastern Missouri and northeastern Arkansas, began a period of extremely strong activity that caused the most powerful earthquakes ever recorded in the Midwest. The Shakers at West Union experienced these.

"On the 10 December [1811]" Samuel McClelland recorded, "the whole nation was suddenly awakened at 2 o’clock in the morning by the shaking of the earth. There were two more shakes after day light, tho’ not so heavy as the first." Immediate structural damage at West Union was minimal, in spite of earthquakes and aftershocks that continued throughout the winter of 1811-12. McClelland wrote:

The beginning of this year [1812] may be singularized by the shaking of the earth, which occurred so often that it would be both tedious and useless to have noticed every one. On the 14th of February, 2 hours before day, was the heaviest shock that was felt on the Wabash. A number of brick houses were cracked and the tops of some chimneys fell off. From carried information, we learn, that the shaking occurs almost daily in New Madrid, that the earth's motion appears to be about 12 inches horizontally in a north and south direction, that large chasms can be seen in many directions, some of which are a mile or more in length, from which muddy water and sulphurous vapors sometimes issue, almost sufficient to suffocate the frightened inhabitants.

McClelland also recorded the widespread fear and sense of doom that pervaded the area for months, as the Earth’s crust continued to heave and settle. The effect was not merely structural, but psychological and religious. Seeded by decades of backcountry revivals and "awakenings," fear of the earthquakes was heightened by apocalyptic foretellings of the coming end of time.

The primary damage done to West Union came from the Wabash River. The earth's shaking caused the Wabash to flow backwards and spill over into its floodplain. This was a huge inconvenience during the wintertime, when the water turned to mud and ice. And like other floods, it caused an increase in malaria and other insect-borne diseases the following spring and summer. In June 1812, McClelland wrote, "The fever began to invade the society in different quarters, and some begin to get very sick."

=== Temporary abandonment ===
At the time of the earthquakes and the fever epidemic of 1811–12, West Union's population was still sizable, with McClelland reporting that "75 boys and 56 girls with a suitable family of brethren and sisters" were at the schoolhouse.

The hardships of the War of 1812 soon returned to visit them, however. The pacifist Shakers had refused to arm themselves or construct a fort for their defense against Native American and British attack. This put them and their property in danger and led to ridicule and harassment by the Indiana territorial militia, by far the Shakers' biggest nuisance. Armed settlers camped in the woods near West Union, "in and out of which they came and went... without even regard for common good behavior." McClelland recorded that "Our gardens and fields were rich and afforded plenty for them and their horses. Our cattle and hogs they butchered and destroyed in a most savage wasteful manner." En route to the relief of Fort Harrison at Terre Haute, "the Press Gang came on and seized some of our horses, some saddles and some axes, as they were in haste to get up to [the fort], it being besieged by the Indians."

Thinking it better to temporarily abandon West Union rather than be abused by the militia or massacred by hostile war parties, the Shaker community loaded their property onto boats and headed downstream in mid-September 1812. Three hundred Shakers and their children, 250 head of sheep, 100 head of Cattle, 14 wagons, a keel boat, a pirogue and a canoe took refuge among the Shaker communities of Kentucky and Ohio until 1814. In their absence, their homes in Indiana were occupied by territorial militiamen. A few Shakers stayed behind to look after West Union, but "the Army was soon increased to 1000, our houses were converted to Barracks, our nurseries to horse lots and our fields to racing grounds. In short, the whole place looked as tho' a host of Pharaoh's plagues had passed over it."

The stress of relocating and a hard winter took a toll on many Shakers during their refuge. Yet some were contemplating a return to Busro as early as the summer and fall of 1813. On January 24, 1814, "Adam Gallagher and Enoch Davis set off for Pittsburgh [from Union Village], for procuring materials for building, such as iron, nails, glass, paints, oil &c." Over forty Shakers set off for Indiana again in March 1814, with more following.

== Decline and abandonment ==
Foreshadowing the dilemma that would face all Shaker communities in the decades to come, the first generation of adult converts at West Union (who had often brought their own biological families into the celibate Shaker society) was now faced with the dilemma of seeing their children leave the faith. Shaker practice encouraged but did not require children raised in the community to become "covenanting" members at age 18.

A tornado struck the community in May 1819 and did significant structural damage to some buildings. It also destroyed much of the Shakers' orchard. Fevers (probably a combination of cholera and yellow fever) continued to plague the settlement, situated as it was along the wetlands fringing the Wabash River. An arsonist was thought to have attempted to burn down one of the dwelling houses in February 1820. Spring floods in 1820 damaged the Shaker's mills.

By September 1826, the unanimous decision of the Shaker Elders at West Union and throughout the wider community of Shakers was that the settlement should be closed. The community was finally abandoned in spring 1827. Farmland and buildings were sold, and portable property was loaded onto wagons and boats for transport to the same communities in Kentucky and Ohio where Shakers had taken refuge during the War of 1812. The new Whitewater Shaker Settlement near Cincinnati, Ohio (founded in 1824) was strengthened by the influx of Shakers from Indiana.

As historian Stephen J. Stein notes, West Union's closing was a major defeat for Shakerism. An immense amount of effort had been put into ensuring its success, as it represented the Society's best chance of expanding farther west, where the nation's future lay. The community's symbolic importance to the Shakers as their westernmost community perhaps explains why it was not abandoned immediately after the War of 1812.

There seems to have been some relationship between the West Union Shakers and the German Rappite utopian community that settled around New Harmony, Indiana, also on the Wabash River. On February 24, 1817, writes McClelland, "Father David with all the Elders" visited the Rappites. In 1824, only a few years before West Union itself was abandoned, the Rappites moved back to Pennsylvania, selling their land to the Welsh utopian thinker and reformer Robert Owen, who renamed the site New Harmony. Inspired in part by the utopian ideals of his Rappite and Shaker predecessors in the Wabash Valley, the secular Owen began the most famous socialist experiment in American history. Owen's colony, too, also failed in time.

=== Remains of the site ===
The land once occupied by the Shakers is now active farmland and owned privately. The site is along an unmarked county road a few miles northwest of Oaktown, Indiana, in the far northwestern corner of Knox County, almost on the Sullivan County line. An Indiana historical marker on U.S. 41 near Oaktown actually stands a few miles from the site. The only Shaker structure that survived into the twentieth century was used as a private home before being demolished.

Archaeological remains of other buildings in the area have been unearthed by local historian John Martin Smith, but are unmarked and difficult to find. The mill was located on the Illinois side of the Wabash, just south of the iron bridge, though no remains are visible.
