= Shaker broom vise =

Production vise for broom making

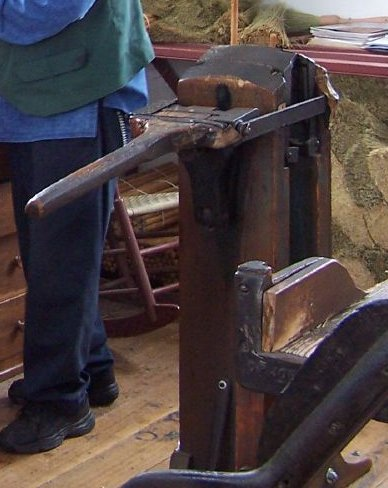
Shaker wooden broom vise close-up

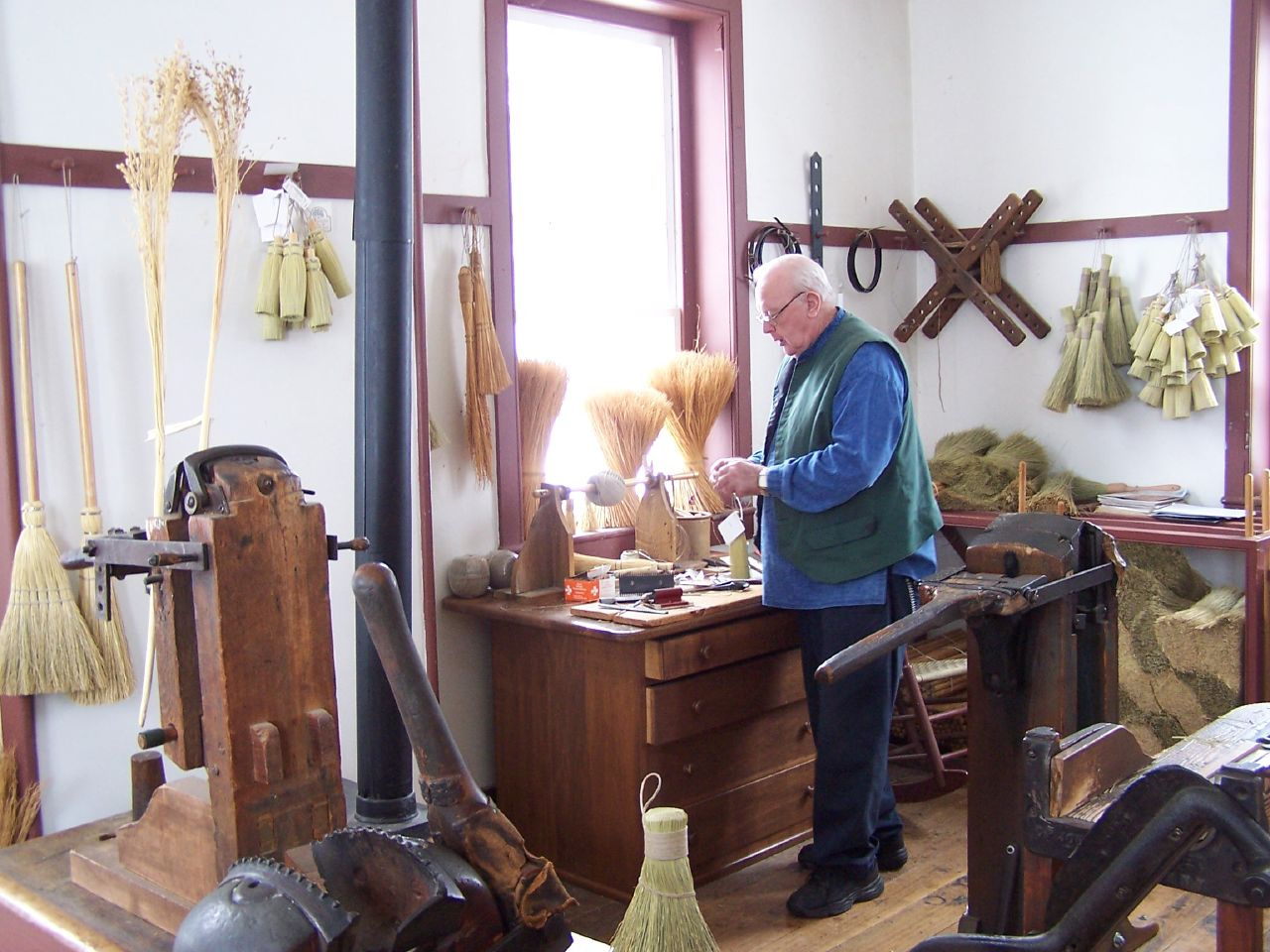
Making Shaker brooms

The Shaker broom vise is a specialized production vise that made the normally round broom flat to make it more efficient for cleaning purposes. The Shakers' invention revolutionized the production and form of brooms; in the process greatly expanding an industry in New England.

== Background ==
Shaker brooms built upon the 1797 contribution of Levi Dickenson of Hadley, Massachusetts, who used tassels of sorghum (Sorghum bicolor), known as broom corn, to make a better grade of broom. Brooms were essential to kitchen and hearth cleanliness. The manufacture and selling of brooms was the most widespread of all the Shaker industries. The first sorghum brooms were made by the Shakers at Watervliet. This colony is credited with being the first to grow broom corn, which was around 1800 when they first grew it on an island in the Mohawk River that was near their community.

== Invention ==
Theodore Bates (1762–1846) of the Watervliet Shaker community is credited with the innovation of the "flat broom" in 1798, as all brooms and brushes prior were round. He invented a unique wooden vise that pressed the round bristles flat. This allowed heavy twine to be sewn through the flattened broom to permanently hold that shape.

Bates' vise idea to make flat brooms and brushes was a leap in technology since it produced products that worked much more efficiently. An industry developed to sell these to the outside world. Soon the New Lebanon community ramped up to make these flat brooms. This flattening technology worked well with their woodworking technology of lathe-turned wood handles. The vise was used as part of the Shaker broom making process.

Most of the Shaker villages were involved in making these flat brooms and flat brushes. The flat brooms were produced by the tens of thousands. Only a few of the original Shaker flat brooms made in the nineteenth century have survived into the twenty-first century. These were made under the auspices of a Mount Lebanon Shaker Trustee named Robert Valentine (1822–1910).

The Shakers were the pioneering inventors of the broom vise, which made today's flat broom possible. According to Lowder (2012) this was "the only major update to the broom since the introduction of the broom machine" and permitted flattening and sewing, instead of mere lashing to a round handle. This design innovation is evidenced in modern brooms (assuming they are not synthetic).

The brooms were respected and given care – such as hanging on the wall when not in use and sometimes covered with cotton hoods to keep them clean. The covered flat brooms were used to dry-polish hard wood floors and clean the last traces of dust off hard surfaces.

The flat broom led to a boom of broom making in the United States. In 1850, more than a million brooms were built in Massachusetts alone, resulting in a large export trade extending to South America. (Note: The Shakers also created the smaller whisk broom.)

== Description ==
The vise consists of two upright planks, one rigidly fixed to the base and the other hinged via a pair of short distance pieces. This can be clearly seen in the small vise on the left of the illustration "Making Shaker brooms". The handle of the broom can pass between the distance pieces, the length of the handle imposing a minimum size on the fixed upright. Larger vises may have the movable jaw hinged at the base and do away with the distance pieces, see the illustration "Shaker broom vises".

Illustrations on Haydenville (2015) show that there are two sets of jaws affixed to the planks. The lower set are level with the top of the planks and are circular when closed to firmly grip the head of the broom. Metal plates rising from the planks carry the upper set which are flat and force the broom corn flat. The jaws are closed by a toggle mechanism operating on horizontal links from the fixed jaw and vertical hanger links from the floor. The toggle is provided with a long wooden handle which the operator can pull down to secure the broom in the vise.

== Gallery ==
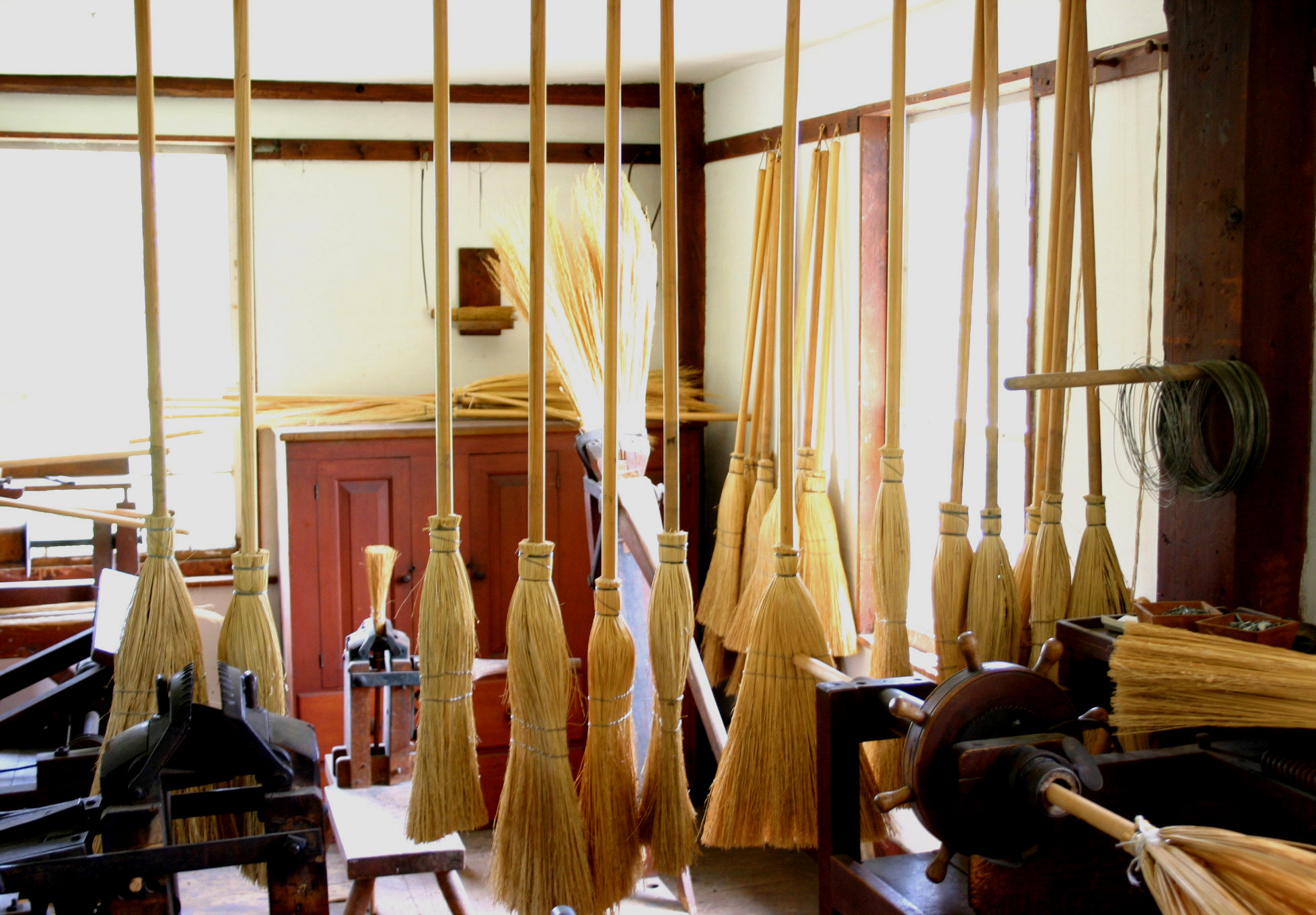
Several Shaker brooms just made

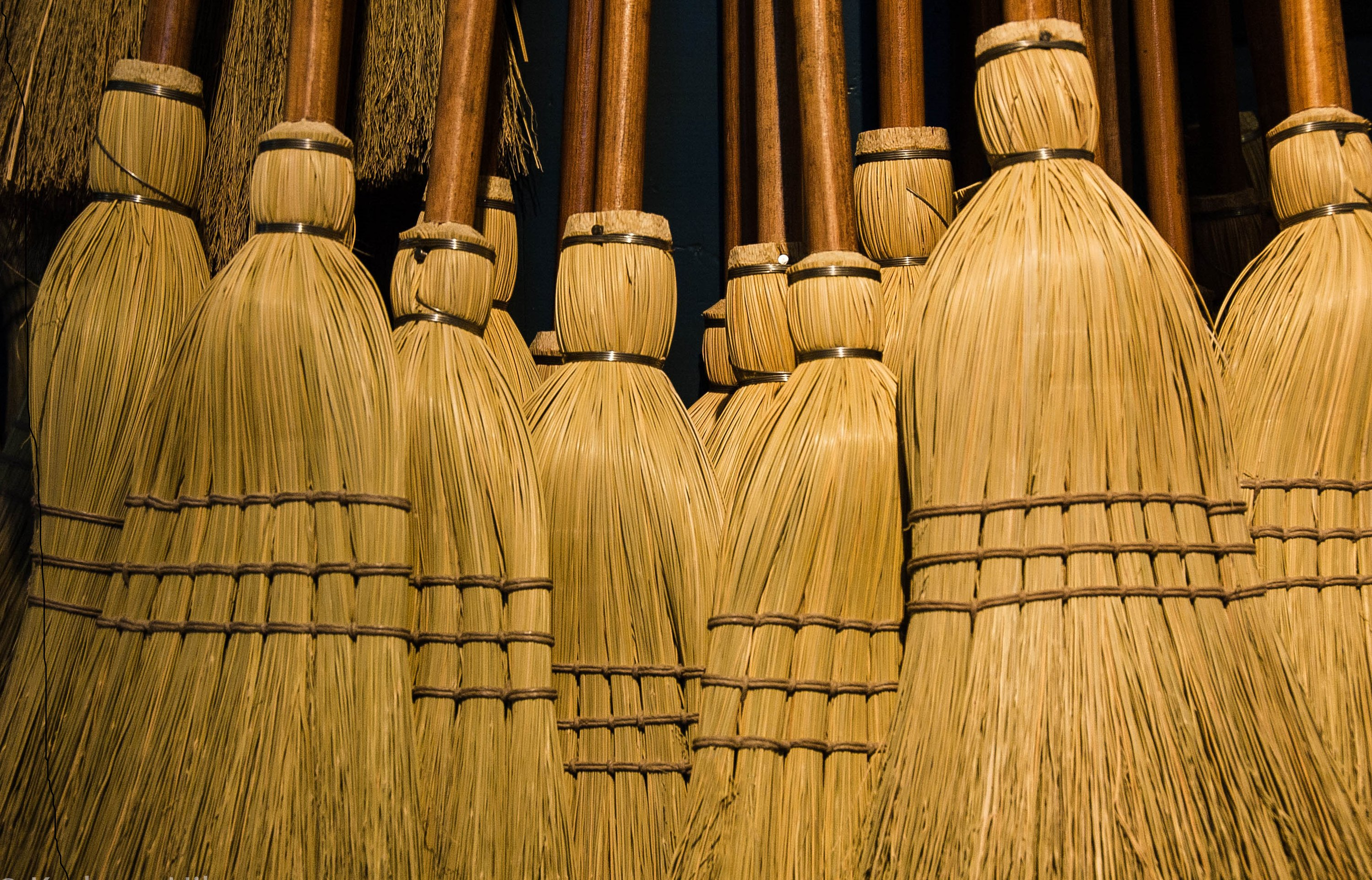
Flat brooms stitched to hold form (Note: "According to the docent, brooms were round until Shakers developed this clamping machine to stitch them flat. The vise holds the broom flat, and the stitcher stitches it.")

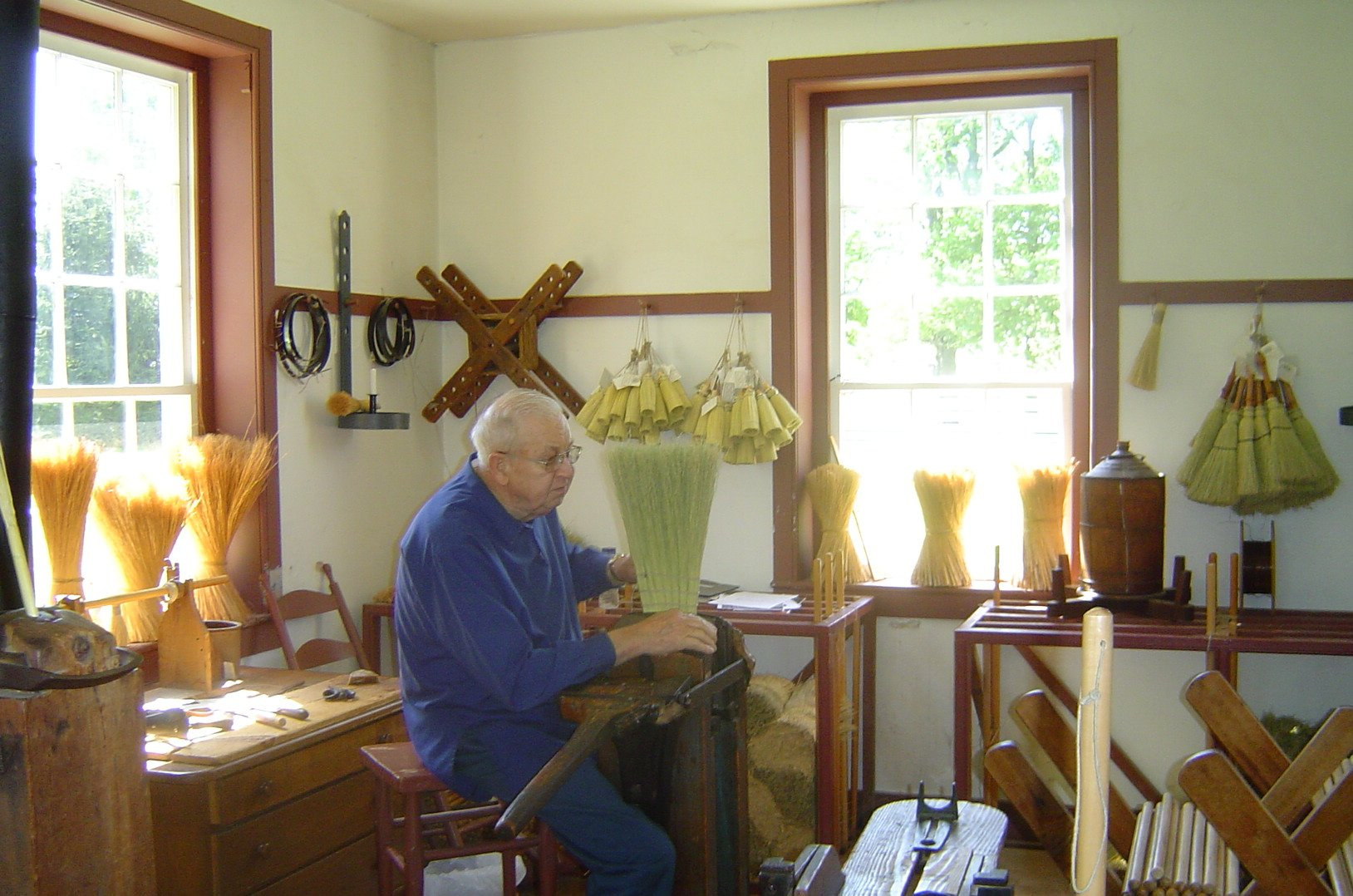
Shaker broom vise working operation

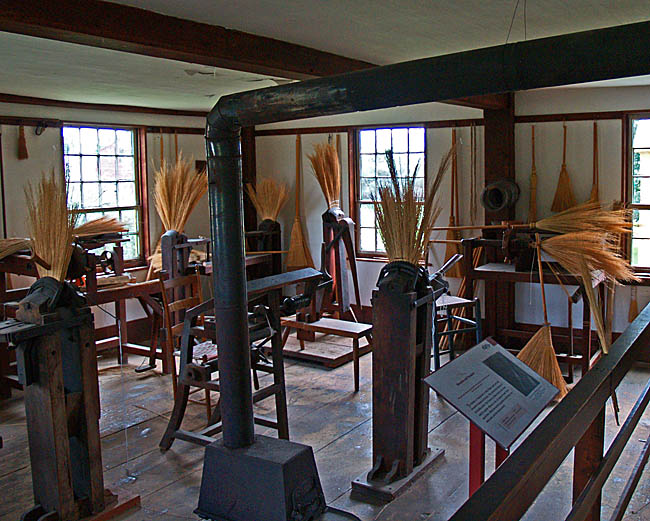
Shaker broom vises in shop

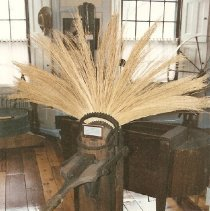
Broom Vise; Enfield Shaker Village, New Hampshire; In the collection at Enfield Shaker Museum.
