= Issachar Bates =

American poet

- Born: 29 January 1758; Hingham, Massachusetts
- Died: 17 March 1837 (aged 79); Mount Lebanon Shaker Society, New Lebanon, New York
- Occupations: Musician, songwriter, fifer, missionary, Shaker Elder, preacher
- Spouse: Lovina Maynard (married 1778, separated 1801)
- Children: 9, including Sarah Bates
- Parent(s): William and Mercy Bates
- Title: Elder

Religious life
- Religion: Christianity
- Denomination: Shaker

Senior posting
- Based in: Union Shaker Village (1805-1812); West Union Shaker Village (1812-1822); Watervliet Shaker Village (Ohio) (1824-1832)
- Period in office: 1805–1835
- Military career
- Allegiance: United States
- Branch: (New England) Massachusetts militia
- Service years: 1775-1780
- Rank: Fife Major
- Conflicts: American Revolutionary War: Battle of Bunker Hill; Siege of Boston; Fortification of Dorchester Heights; New York and New Jersey campaign; Battle of Long Island; Battle of Harlem Heights; Battle of White Plains; Battle of Bound Brook; Saratoga campaign

Issachar Bates (January 29, 1758 – March 17, 1837) was among the most prolific poets and songwriters among the early 19th century Shakers. Several of his songs, poems, and ballads are known outside of the Shaker movement, including "Rights of Conscience", written around 1808 and included in the Shakers' first printed hymnbook, Millennial Praises, and "Come Life, Shaker Life", written between 1835 and 1837.

== Early life ==
Bates was born to William and Mercy Bates in Hingham, Massachusetts on January 29, 1758. He was one of eleven children. In the 1760s, his family moved to Sherborn and Southborough, Massachusetts, before settling near Templeton, Massachusetts, around 1771. As a teenager in 1775, Bates taught himself to play the fife and joined the local militia. He served several tours of duty in the American Revolutionary War, mainly as a fifer and fife major. During the war years, at the age of 20, he married Lovina Maynard, the daughter of Bezaleel Maynard, a local man with whom Bates had served in the militia.

== Adulthood ==
After the war, Bates returned to the area of Athol, Massachusetts. In 1781 he was present at the Petersham, Massachusetts, home of David Hammond when Ann Lee and her Shaker followers traveled through the area and were hosted for a few days of preaching and proselytizing. Bates wrote of being drawn to Ann Lee's teaching at that time, but his family responsibilities inhibited him from further action towards becoming a Shaker himself. During this period, Bates was in his early twenties with a growing family. He tried several different trades but was unsuccessful. In the late 1780s, he migrated with his wife and children to the region of the southern Adirondacks, an area through which he had traveled during his wartime service. He migrated with an extended family group, which included members of his wife's family, and he settled in Hartford, New York.

In the 1790s, Bates entered a long period of spiritual turmoil. He was a popular and jolly member of the Hartford, New York, community, and he served the church as the choirmaster, putting to use his considerable musical talents. But inwardly, Bates did not feel that he was truly a Christian. He continued to harbor thoughts of the Shakers. After much depression and soul-searching, he experienced a profound religious conversion around 1795. After that, he discovered a gift for preaching, and he was licensed to preach at Baptist churches around the region. He also began writing poetry, and he published a set of eight poetic texts in 1801 under the title, New Songs, On Different Subjects. But spiritual satisfaction continued to elude Bates, and he secretly remained drawn to the Shakers. Finally, in the summer of 1801, he visited New Lebanon, New York, on the pretext of making a journey to visit his aged father in western Massachusetts. While there, he made the decision to become a Shaker. He returned to Hartford, where he faced considerable opposition from his family. Later that summer, he journeyed back to New Lebanon, where he made his formal confession of sins.

== Shakers ==
The Shakers instantly recognized Bates's talent for preaching and proselytizing. Soon after his confession of sins, he undertook preaching trips on behalf of the Shakers. As a Shaker missionary, he was paired with Benjamin Seth Youngs. Between 1801 and 1805, the two were sent into Vermont, New Hampshire, and areas of New York state.

In 1805, he left New Lebanon, New York, for an extended trip west with two other Shaker missionaries, John Meacham and Benjamin S. Youngs. Their travels took them to Kentucky and Ohio where the camp meeting revivals had taken place. Bates was the musician who sang at the first official Shaker meeting in the West at Turtle Creek, Ohio, on May 23, 1805. He was nearly strapped on a horse and thrown out of Indiana by antagonistic locals who objected to the Shakers establishing a community at West Union (Busro), Indiana.

Bates eventually walked several thousand miles across Kentucky and the Midwest in the interests of advancing Shakerism.

Before he joined the Shakers in 1801, Bates had learned many of the tunes of that time. He used one of these tunes in his early Shaker hymn, "Rights of Conscience", composed about 1810. This long ballad hymn of fifteen verses pays tribute to both George Washington and Mother Ann Lee. Bates based his hymn on the popular tune of Washington's time, titled "The President's March".

Later on Bates became a prominent Shaker church leader, serving mainly at Watervliet, Ohio, just south of Dayton. He wrote many Shaker spirituals, including an anthem, "Mount Zion", and the hymn, "Ode to Contentment", with words attributed to Elder Richard Pelham at the Shaker community in North Union, Ohio.

Bates returned to New Lebanon, New York in 1835 and the following year completed his lively and informative autobiography. He remained at New Lebanon until his death on March 17, 1837. As per his request, "Almighty Savior", a hymn which he had composed, was sung at his funeral.

Bates was the father of Sarah Bates, who became known in her own right for her activities among the Shakers.
