= Sarah Bates (Shaker) =

American Shaker artist

- Born: 29 November 1792; Hartford, New York
- Died: 1881 (aged 88–89); Mount Lebanon Shaker Society, New Lebanon, New York
- Occupations: Artist, schoolteacher, tailor, song-writer, singer
- Known for: Gift drawings
- Parent(s): Issachar Bates and Lovina Maynard

Religious life
- Religion: Christianity
- Denomination: Shaker

Sarah Bates (November 29, 1792 – 1881) was an American Shaker artist.

Born in Hartford, New York, Bates was the daughter of Elder Issachar Bates, and entered Watervliet Shaker Village upon his conversion in 1801. Three years later she moved to the Mount Lebanon Shaker Society where she was to remain for the rest of her life. She was trained as a schoolteacher and "tailoress", and in both pursuits was associated with Polly Anne Reed, with whom she was a member of the First Order of the Church. She was likely a scribe for her community, and is known to have composed several songs as well. She also wrote at least one essay, and was active for a time as a deaconess. Her sister Betsey would become an Eldress at New Lebanon.

Bates has been posited, by Daniel W. Patterson, as the creator of seventeen gift drawings produced during the Shaker Era of Manifestations. The case which he makes is circumstantial, based largely on his analysis of membership rolls of the First Order of the Church. The influence of Polly Reed can be seen on Bates' work, especially in the precision and elegance of its calligraphy and drawing. Patterson points to certain stylistic points as hallmarks of hers as well, including the shape of the dove which often appears in her drawings and the crosshatching used to delineate the surfaces of tree trunks and tables. Several of Bates' most complex drawings are "sacred sheets", gatherings of symbolic language that draw much of their iconography, such as Masonic symbols and images from gravestones and needlework samplers, from the world beyond the borders of the Shaker community. Bates has been described as a "seminal figure" in the field of gift drawings.

An untitled drawing by Bates, in pen and brush and colored inks over graphite, is owned by the Philadelphia Museum of Art.
