= Polly Anne Reed =

American Shaker artist (1818–1881)

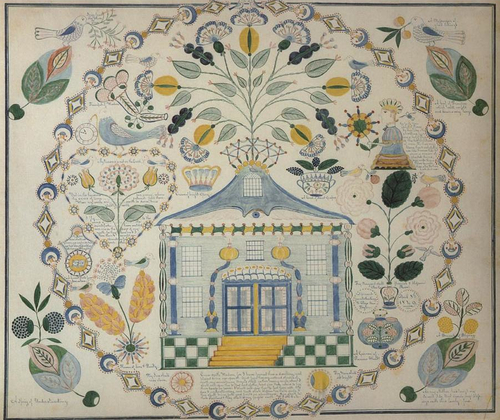
Example of a "gift drawing" by Polly Anne Reed

Polly Anne (sometimes Jane) Reed (1818–1881) was an American Shaker artist. She is considered one of the most accomplished artists in the Shaker community.

Reed was a native of Fairfield, New York. When she was eight, her family was visited by Shaker missionary Calvin Green; she requested to return to the community at New Lebanon, New York with him, and was allowed to do so by her parents. The story of her conversion was well known even outside Shaker circles, becoming the subject of the 1909 novel Susanna and Sue by Kate Douglas Wiggin, illustrated by Alice Barber Stephens and N.C. Wyeth.

Reed entered the First Order of the Church at New Lebanon, the most important of the "families" in the community, in December 1825. She spent much of her life as a "tailoress", and was recognized as "a great worker with her hands". Educated entirely within the society, she herself later became a schoolteacher for New Lebanon children. Her penmanship was recognized for its beauty even during her lifetime; she was often requested to act as a scribe, and created many manuscript hymnals using "letteral notation", a system for notating music which the Shakers had invented. Her stitchery was also well-regarded. She was recognized during her teaching career for introducing girls to the tannery and the botanical garden, among other industries which supported the Mount Lebanon Shakers, and for allowing organized play in the classroom. In 1855 she was appointed an Eldress, and in 1869 she became a member of the Ministry, serving in the latter position until her death.

During the Era of Manifestations, Reed became one of a handful of Shakers, mostly women, to produce "gift drawings" based on their visionary experiences; another was her associate Sarah Bates, and drawings produced by the two women share many similarities. Close to fifty of Reed's drawings are extant. Most are small cutouts of hearts or leaves, covered with text, but a half-dozen are fully developed works of art combining calligraphy with images of doves, flowers, and more fanciful items. Some incorporate Masonic imagery. Several of her pieces were created as "rewards of merit" for her students. Works by Reed can be found in the collections of the Abby Aldrich Rockefeller Folk Art Museum, the Western Reserve Historical Society, and the American Folk Art Museum, among other institutions.
