= Watervliet Shaker Village (Ohio) =

Watervliet Shaker Village was a Shaker community located in Kettering, Ohio, from 1806 to 1900. Its spiritual name was Vale of Peace and it was within the Union Village bishopric, or governing body.

The community was founded by many discontented members of the Beulah Presbyterian church and was named for the first Shaker community in the United States, Watervliet Shaker village in New York. The village at its peak had 100 residents, and it spanned 800 acres, 640 of which were in Montgomery and the remainder on the other side of County Line Road in Greene County. It produced and sold farm produce, garden seeds, and stocking yarn.

The village closed in 1900 and the remaining residents moved to the Union Village Shaker settlement in Lebanon, Ohio. The village was sold to the State of Ohio. It was a State Hospital Farm until 1981 when the land in Montgomery County was deeded to the Miami Research Foundation. The land in Greene County had primarily been used for Mount Saint John.

Papers, diaries, photographs and books of the village history are archived at the Dayton Metro Library in the "Shakers Collection". Five key individuals are mentioned: William J. Hamilton, Issachar Bates, Richard McNemar, Nancy Moore and Stephen Ball.

There is a historic marker was installed in 2003 in Kettering just 788 feet north of Research Park Boulevard and County Line Road to mark the location of the one-time Shaker village.
