= Millennial Praises =

Early collection of Shaker hymns

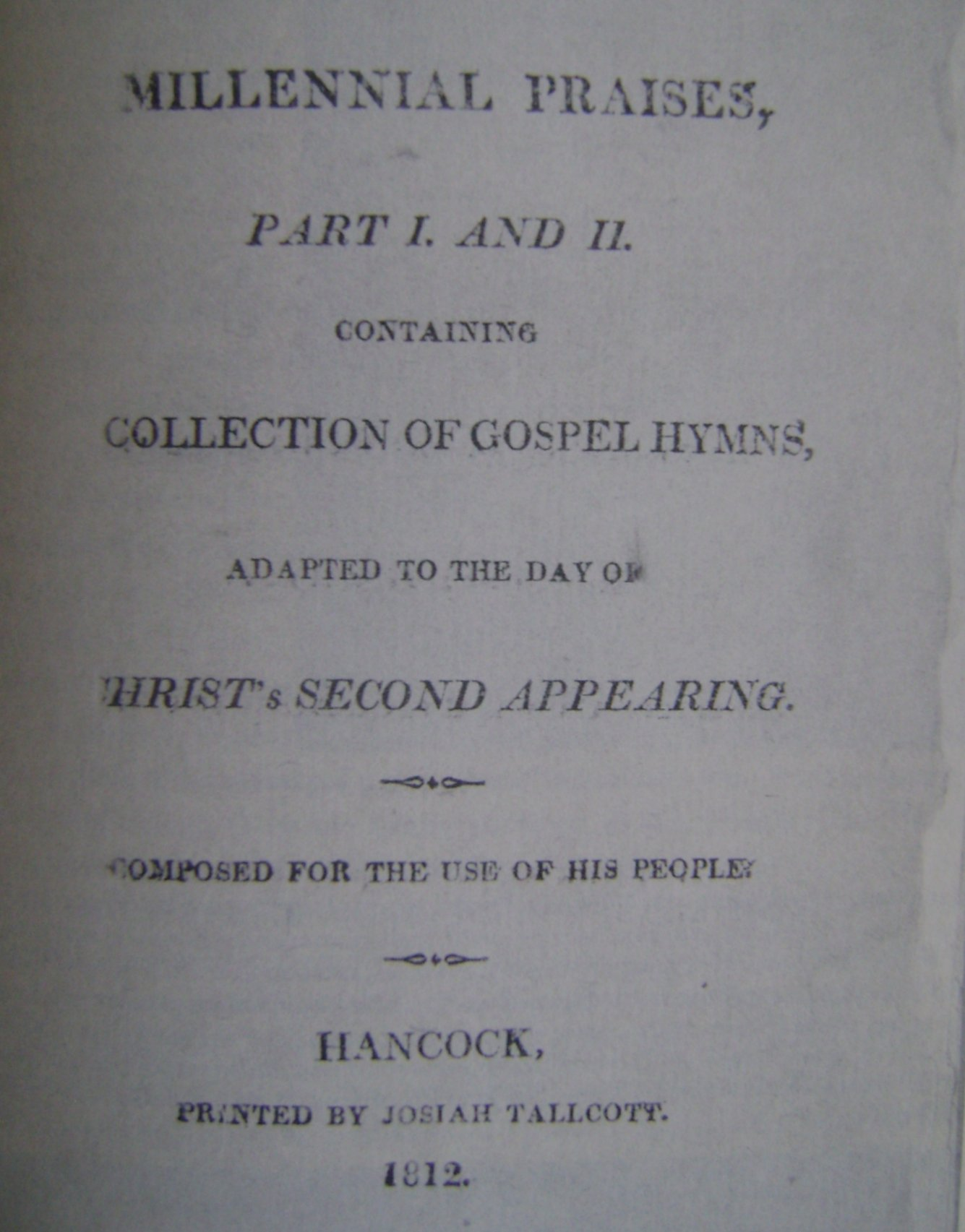
Millennial Praises 1812 title page

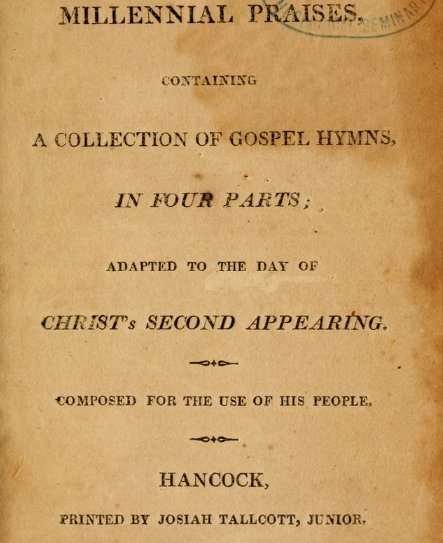
Millennial Praises 1813 title page

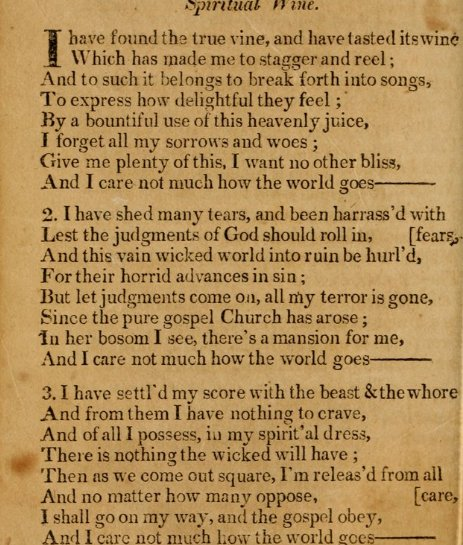
Spiritual Wine hymn by Issachar Bates

Millennial Praises is the first published collection of Shaker hymns. It was first printed by the Shakers in 1812.

== Background ==
The Shakers began writing down their hymns as a means of conveying their religious philosophy to new converts. Thousands of handwritten hymns were recorded in hundreds of manuscripts.

In the late eighteenth and early nineteenth centuries, the Shakers began moving west from New York, into Ohio and Kentucky. By the first decade of the nineteenth century, there were at least five communities and as many as twenty in Ohio and Kentucky. This western expansion brought about the idea for collecting the hymns into a printed book. The scribes could no longer keep up with the pace of copying new hymns that were being composed both at New Lebanon in New York and in the western communities, where fully two-thirds of the hymns were being written. From this body of handwritten hymns were selected the 140 hymns published in Millennial Praises.

== Description ==
Millennial Praises was the first published Shaker hymn book. Many printed Shaker hymn books followed. The Millennial Praises hymnal contained only the words of the 140 hymns, without any musical notation. The hymns were about Christ, God, love, praise, work, and the growth of the Shaker communities. The hymns also conveyed the idea that males and females are equal – an idea connected to the value of celibacy in Shakerism. The first hymn in the Millennial Praises reflects the Shaker viewpoint that God is both male and female. The Shakers claimed that nearly all the words in the hymn book were spiritual "gifts", and that only a few words were derived from other sources.

The first edition, compiled by Seth Y. Wells and edited by Richard McNemar of the Union Village Shaker settlement, was titled Millennial Praises Parts I and II Containing a Collection of Gospel Hymns. It was printed at Hancock, Massachusetts, in 1812. The 1813 edition, again published in Hancock, had four parts and was titled Millennial Praises, Containing a Collection of Gospel Hymns in Four Parts, adapted to the day of Christ's second appearing – composed for the use of his people. McNemar composed about 70 of the 140 hymns, and about a dozen were written by Issachar Bates, a Shaker poet. In Spiritual Wine (see hymn illustration), Bates uses the drunkenness one gets from wine as a metaphor for the Shakers' philosophy of drunkenness through spiritual wine.

== Adaptation to music ==
About the time of the publication of Millennial Praises, the Shakers began to record song melodies using different systems. The "letteral notations" for adaptation of the hymns to music were slowly developed over the next few decades. There were debates as to which system was the best to achieve uniformity among all the Shaker villages. They developed a "tone-ometer" to set a consistent pitch for the songs and a "mode-ometer" to set the tempo. In 1843 Isaac N. Youngs published his instruction manual, A Short Abridgement of the Rules of Music. In 1847 Russell Haskell published his instruction manual, The Musical Expositor. The first hymn book published with musical notation, using many of the Millennial Praises hymns, was produced in 1852 by Henry Blinn under the title, A Sacred Repository of Hymns.

== Gallery ==
- Hymn 1 of each of the four parts for the 1813 version.
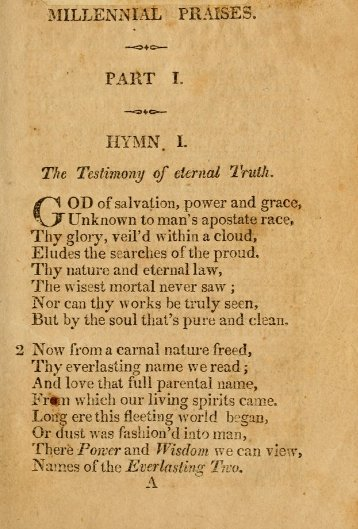

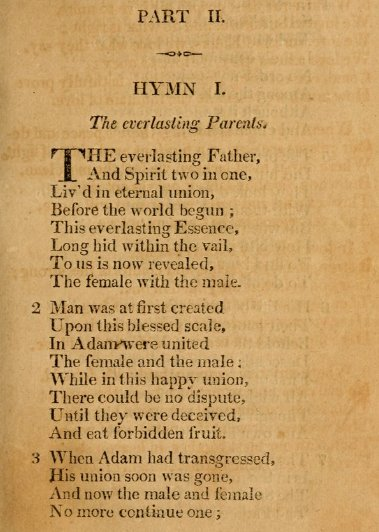

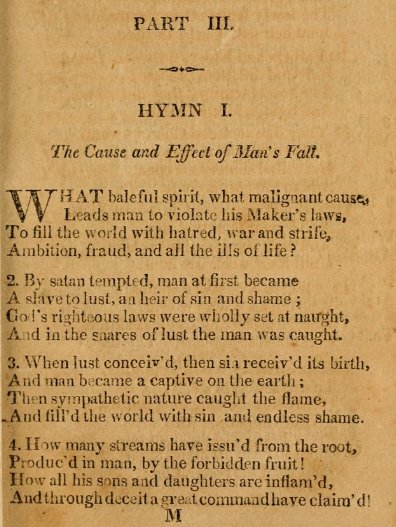

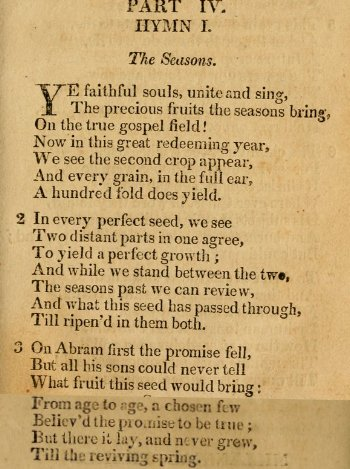
- "Mother" hymn is about Mother Ann Lee's journey to America.
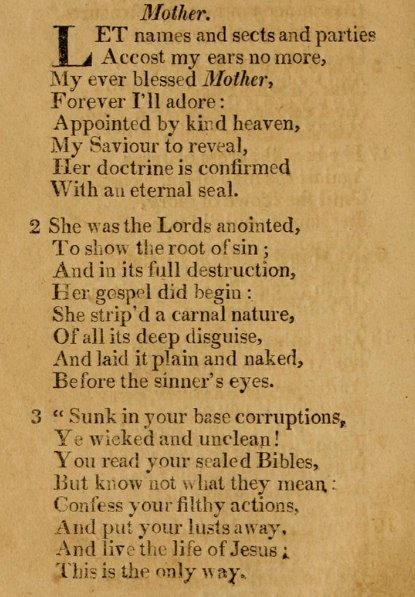

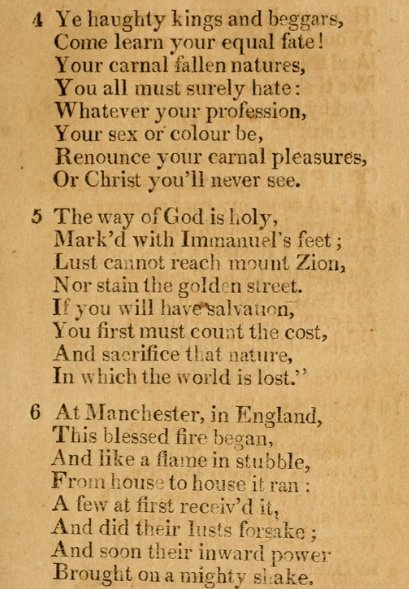

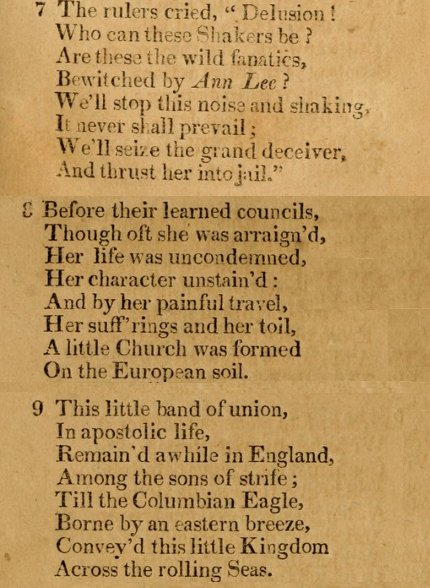

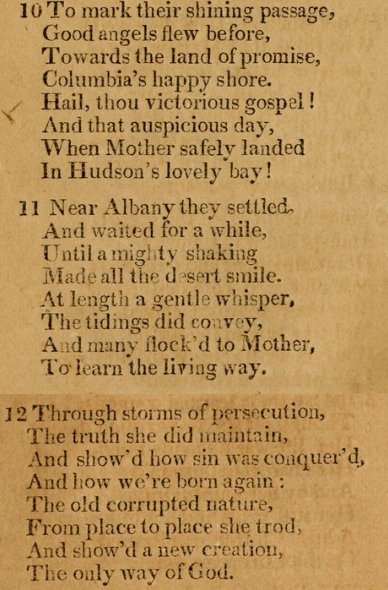
