= Anna White =

Shaker eldress and social reformer

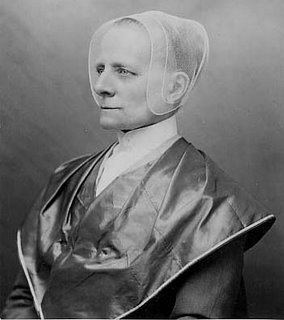
- Born: January 21, 1831. Brooklyn, New York
- Died: December 16, 1910 (aged 79); New Lebanon, New York
- Occupation: Shaker Eldress at Mount Lebanon Shaker Society
- Years active: 1865-1910
- Notable work: Shakerism: Its Meaning and Message

Anna White (21 January 1831 – 16 December 1910) was a Shaker Eldress, social reformer, author, and hymnwriter.

== Biography ==
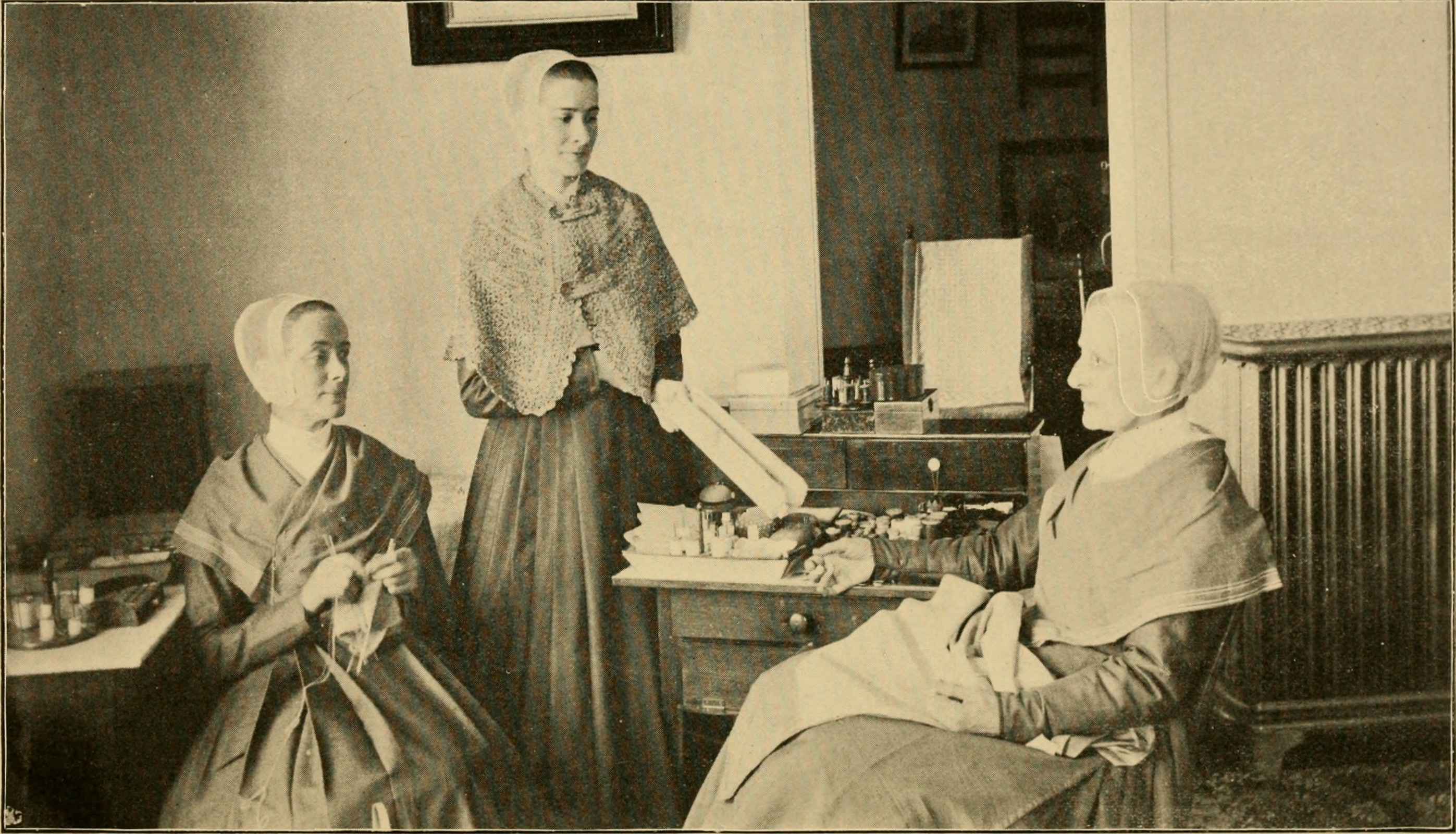
Left to right: Martha Jane Anderson, Grace Bowers, and Eldress Anna White

Anna White born on January 21, 1831, in Brooklyn, New York, the third daughter of five children of Robert and Hannah White (nee Gibbs). Her parents were both Quakers, her father having joined by marriage. One of her earliest memories was hearing anti-slavery lecturer Lucretia Mott speak, but she was disturbed when Mott was "abruptly silenced by the guardians of Quaker orthodoxy." She went to a Quaker school in Poughkeepsie, New York, called Mansion Square Seminary, and had a strong social conscience influenced by both her faith and her parents. At seventeen, White learned the trade of tailoring, and helped her mother distribute alms from the Quakers to the poor of New York.

White became interested in the Shakers after her father joined Hancock Shaker Village, where he had done business. Anna was the only member of the family to join her father in the religion, formally joining the Mount Lebanon Shaker Society's North Family at 18 years old in 1849. Joining the Shakers alienated both of them from the rest of the family, with a rich uncle even threatening to dis-inherent her of $40,000 ($1.55 million in 2025) if she went through with it. At only nineteen years old White signed the 1829 North Family Covenant, a legal document promising to live as a Shaker for the rest of her life without compensation for work in the community, which typically was only signed by those over twenty. White helped with housework, and cared for female visitors and guests.

The music of the Shakers was one of the things that had initially attracted her to the religion, and she would go on to write hundreds of spiritual songs, and compile two books of Shaker music which included some of her own hymns.

White was a student of Elder Frederick Evans and Eldress Antoinette Doolittle of the Mount Lebanon Society, and was also taught by the Eldress Ruth Landon, who had seen the founder of Shakerism, Ann Lee. In 1865, White became second eldress to Eldress Doolittle, and upon Doolittle's death in 1887, became first eldress. She became a vegetarian following the example of Elder Evans, and the rest of the North Family followed her example.

White was an active advocate for social reform and pacifism. She wrote in support of Alfred Dreyfus during the Dreyfus affair. She gave a number of speeches, most notably those at the Universal Peace Union, the Equal Rights Club, and at a peace conference at Mount Lebanon. The resolutions written at the Mount Lebanon meeting in 1905 were forwarded to The Hague, and subsequently adopted, and were brought to President Theodore Roosevelt by White personally. After collecting more signatures than any other woman in the state in a petition for disarmament, White was appointed vice president of the New York of the Women’s International League of Peace and Arbitration. She also wrote a number of articles, was a leader in Alliance of Women for Peace and National Council of Women, and a member of the National American Woman Suffrage Association.

In 1904, White cowrote Shakerism: Its Meaning and Message with Eldress Leila S. Taylor, which was the only published history of the Shaker movement written by one of its members. The book joined Shaker principles and socially progressive values such as women's equality. Around the same time, White began to suffer from an illness which went on for a number of years. She became interested in Christian Science, and Eldress Taylor wrote in The Christian Science Journal that she was healed by a Christian Science practitioner and became "a thorough convert" to the religion, leading others in the Shaker village to become interested in it as well, which they saw as paralleling Shakerism.

White's final years were spent mostly within the community, although she traveled outside to attend meetings. She died on 16 December 1910.

== Selected works ==
- White, Anna; Taylor, Laila S. (1904). Shakerism: Its Meaning and Message. Columbus, OH: F.J. Heer.
