= Isaac N. Youngs =

American Shaker (1793–1865)

Isaac Newton Youngs (July 4, 1793 – August 7, 1865) was a member of the Shakers. He was a prolific scribe, correspondent, and diarist who documented the history of the New Lebanon, New York Church Family of Shakers from 1815 to 1865.

== Early life ==
Isaac Newton Youngs was born in Johnstown, New York on July 4, 1793, the youngest child of Martha (Farley) and Seth Youngs Jr. He was christened in the Methodist church there.

Seth Youngs decided to join the Shakers when Isaac was about six months old, and took Isaac and his other young children into the Shaker society at Watervliet, New York, where Isaac's aunt and uncle, Molly (Van Epps) and Benjamin Youngs, lived. Isaac's mother chose not to join, so the infant Isaac was fostered by Benjamin and Molly Youngs at first.

Youngs lived with them for several years in an arrangement that was not unusual at the time. Many children, Shaker or not, were separated from their parents at young ages. Being "put out" or sent to live with another family was an old custom meant to keep children from being spoiled. Children were indentured to learn trades, as well, and that often meant living as an apprentice with the family of a master craftsman, rather than with kin.

Benjamin Youngs was a clockmaker, and his nephew Isaac was fascinated by machinery. He learned to tell time before he could talk, and enjoyed watching his uncle work on clocks.

At age thirteen, Youngs was sent from Watervliet to the New Lebanon, New York Shaker village, where he became an apprentice to tailors David Slosson and Rufus Bishop. He spent most of his life at New Lebanon. Due to his work ethic and intelligence, he was allowed to branch out into additional trades, including clockmaking.

Youngs struggled with the demands of being a believer, particularly in regards to celibacy. He eventually became a role model to younger Shakers in conquering lust.

== Employment ==
Shakers had a work ethic and each Believer's workday was supposed to be filled with productive activity every waking moment. The New Lebanon Shaker village journals show how busy Youngs was.

Youngs was versatile in his work. He taught the New Lebanon Church Family boys' school, and spent part of every winter tailoring and training new apprentices. During planting and harvest seasons, he worked on the farm. He co-authored A Juvenile Monitor, which was a guide for good behavior for children and youth. He helped build the new meeting house for the New Lebanon Church Family, wrote poems and a hymn for its dedication, and repaired its tin roof. He built furniture, transcribed hymnals by hand, helped build the brethren's new workshop, and attended camp meetings, repaired the village's waterworks, built an arch in the sisters' weave shop, ran social meetings for the Children's Order, worked on the Church Family dwelling, turned more than a thousand clothespins on a lathe, and laid a new floor in the dairy.

A prolific scribe, Youngs kept detailed records about himself and his society, including several domestic journals, a clockmaker's journal, tailor's journals, and at least three religious journals. He composed a dialogue between the Flesh and the Spirit, an autobiography in verse, and a spiritual autobiography. More than eight thousand pages of his writings survive as historical documentation of the Shaker Ministry's home village from 1815 to 1865. (See list below.) In 1834, he toured the Shaker societies in Ohio and Kentucky, kept a journal of the trip, and made maps of the villages he visited.

Youngs also wrote poetry (some of it lyrics for hymns) and did the Church Family's bookkeeping.

He worked on clocks throughout his life, and perfected his wall clock design with wooden works in 1840. Several of his 1840 wall clocks are at Hancock Shaker Village.

Two members of his society described him as a genius. One of his students, Elisha Blakeman, wrote that Youngs' mechanical genius was remarkable. He could turn machinist, mason or anything that promoted the general good. Many conveniences, which added so much to Shakers' domestic happiness, Blakeman concluded, owed their origin to Youngs.

Youngs mastered a number of trades. He was a tailor, mechanic, and inventor: of a metronome, tonometer, leveling instrument, and five-pointed pen for drawing music staffs. He was also a lens-grinder, stonecutter, button maker, tinsmith, printer, pipe fitter, joiner, and blacksmith. He built a sundial, made sisters' tools such as knitting needles, bodkins, and a weaver's reed. He was the master builder for the New Lebanon Church Family's 1839 schoolhouse.

After working as the New Lebanon boys' schoolteacher, Youngs designed a new teacher's desk.

Youngs held the first position in the New Lebanon Shaker choir, where he set the pitch for their hymns during worship. He wrote tunes and lyrics, and taught singing. He also corresponded with other musicians throughout the society to standardize their music notation. He wrote The Rudiments of Music Displayed and Explained in 1833.

His A Short Abridgement of the Rules of Music, published in 1843, was the second historically notable collection of Shaker music to be published (the first being their hymnal Millennial Praises in 1813). Composer Roger Lee Hall has researched this theory book and composed one of the tunes and his composition is titled, "Seven Variations on a Shaker Marching Tune."

However, Youngs complained of being overworked. In 1837, in his Autobiography in Verse, he wrote: "I'm overrun with work and chores / Upon the farm or within doors," and added, "An endless list of chores & notions, To keep me in perpetual motion."

== Later life ==
From 1856 to 1860, Youngs wrote a history of the New Lebanon Shakers. In it, he covered a wide variety of topics, including equality of the sexes, worship, building construction, farming practices, brethren's trades, food, dress, women's work, music, education, avoidance of militia service and other conflicts with the state, donations, and casualties.

In his later years, he suffered from health problems, perhaps a result of lead poisoning from years of soldering seams in tin roofs. He grew anxious and depressed, as well as feeling even more overworked; he was uncomfortable physically and emotionally. He grew to despise tailoring, his primary trade. But he continued to keep the New Lebanon Church Family journal almost to the end of his life. In 1864, he wrote that he was very much out of health and recognized that he was not always rational. Finally he slipped into dementia, as had his parents and several siblings before him.

Isaac Newton Youngs died at age 72. Giles Avery, one of his former students, wrote: "Dear Br Isaac N. Youngs, now exceedingly demented, jumped out of a fourth story window, at the south end of the great central house; onto the walk below, he lived only about 2 hours, thereafter." Despite the problems of his later years, he was eulogized with affection, respect, and empathy.

== Selected bibliography ==
- Youngs, Isaac Newton. Autobiography in Verse, July 4, 1837. Winterthur Museum Library, Winterthur, DE, Andrews Shaker collection ms. 1010.
- ––– Br. Isaac Youngs' Journal. Tour with Br. Rufus Bishop, through the States of Ohio and Kentucky, in the Summer of 1834. 2 vol. Shaker Museum | Mount Lebanon, Old Chatham, NY, mss. 12,751 and 12,752. Vols. 141-142.
- ––– A brief collection of hymns: improved in sacred worship, written by Isaac Newton Youngs, beginning Jan. 1, 1826. DLCms 230.
- ––– A Clock Maker's Journal (1815–35). Western Reserve Historical Society, Cleveland, OH, Cathcart Shaker collection ms. V:B–86.
- ––– A Collection of Anthems and Spiritual Songs; Improved in our General Worship. From the year 1813 to 1837. Transcribed and written in this Book, by Isaac N. Youngs: 1854, New Lebanon. Ohio History Center, Columbus, Ohio, Shaker Mss Collection 119, ms. IV:5.
- ––– A Collection of Spiritual Songs: Commonly called Extra Songs; Improved in our Sacred Worship. Written by Isaac N. Youngs. 1845 and onward. Western Reserve Historical Society, Cleveland, OH, Cathcart Shaker collection ms. SM-70.
- ––– Concise View, 1856-61. Winterthur Museum Library Andrews Shaker collection ms. 861.
- ––– Day-Book B. Kept by the Trustees (1836–50). Hancock Shaker Village, Pittsfield, MA, ms. 9784.N5, M928, ID #356.
- ––– Diary (1837–59). Shaker Museum | Mount Lebanon ms. 10,509.
- ––– Domestic Journal of Daily Occurrences (1834–46). New York State Library, Albany, NY.
- ––– Domestic Journal of Daily Occurrences (1847–55). Western Reserve Historical Society Cathcart Shaker collection ms. V:B–70.
- ––– and John M. Brown. Domestic Journal (1856–69). Western Reserve Historical Society Cathcart Shaker collection ms. V:B–71.
- ––– Family and Meeting Journal (1815–23). Library of Congress Shaker ms. 42.
- ––– [Hymnal] Made for Edward Fowler, By Isaac N. Youngs, March 1833, A Collection of Hymns, Improved by the Followers of Christ in his Second Appearing. Berkshire Athenaeum Local History Room, Pittsfield, MA, ms. V 289.8 Un3.3 v10.
- ––– Idle Company: A Treatise on Disorderly Communication, particularly for boys and youth, 1854. Western Reserve Historical Society Cathcart Shaker collection ms. VII:B-103.
- ––– and Derobigne Bennett. Journal of Inspirational Meetings (1840–41). Western Reserve Historical Society Cathcart Shaker collection ms. VIII:B-138.
- –––, Rufus Bishop, and Garrett Lawrence. A Juvenile Monitor: containing instructions for youth and children, pointing out ill manners, and showing them how to behave in the various conditions of childhood and youth (1823). Winterthur Museum Library Andrews Shaker collection ms. 296.
- ––– et al. Memorandum of the Proceedings of the School (1817–35). Shaker Museum | Mount Lebanon ms. 10,469.
- ––– Personal Journal (1839–58). Western Reserve Historical Society Cathcart Shaker collection ms. V:B-134.
- ––– and Seth Youngs Wells. Records Kept by Order of the Church, vol. I (1780-1855). New York Public Library Shaker ms. #7.
- ––– and Giles B. Avery. Records Kept by Order of the Church vol. III (1856-1871). Shaker Museum | Mount Lebanon ms. 10,509.
- ––– Domestic Journal of Daily Occurrences (1834–46). New York State Library, Albany, New York.
- ––– Rudiments of music displayed and explained (1833). Library of Congress Shaker ms. 150.
- ––– A Short Abridgement of the Rules of Music: with lessons for exercise and a few observations for new beginners. New Lebanon, N.Y.: Shakers, 1843.
- ––– A short treatise on the process of cutting by the square and plumb rule: with some general observations on the business of tailoring, etc., 1828. Shaker Library, Sabbathday Lake Shaker Village, New Gloucester, ME.
- ––– and Garret K. Lawrence. A Short Treatise containing Observations on the Duty of Believers: suitable for the consideration of those who have but just arrived at the age of discretion and understanding and necessary to be regarded and put in practice by all who wish to have their lives agreeable to themselves & others: addressed to youth. New-Lebanon, N.Y.: Shakers, 1823.
- ––– Sketches of Visions, 1838. Western Reserve Historical Society Cathcart Shaker collection ms. VII:B-113.
- ––– Songbook (1864) written for Alonzo Hollister. Western Reserve Historical Society Cathcart Shaker collection ms. IX:B-413.
- ––– Spiritual Autobiography, 1848, in Autobiography of the Saints, Alonzo Hollister transcription, 1868. Western Reserve Historical Society Cathcart Shaker collection ms. VI:B-36.
- ––– and Benjamin Gates. Tailors' Journal (1838–45). Shaker Museum | Mount Lebanon ms. 9657.
- ––– [and Benjamin Gates]. Taylor's Journal (1845–65). Western Reserve Historical Society Cathcart Shaker collection ms. V:B-139.
- ––– and David A. Buckingham. Treatise on Music (1840). New York State Library, ms. 358.
- ––– Trustee's Account Book (1857–62). Hancock Shaker Village ms. #393.
