= The Manifesto (Shaker periodical) =

19th century newspaper

- Editor: George Albert Lomas; Frederick William Evans; Antoinette Doolittle; Henry Clay Blinn
- Categories: Shakers, history, theology, mail order catalog
- Frequency: Monthly
- Publisher: Canterbury Shaker Village
- Founded: 1871
- Final issue: 1899
- OCLC: 64395321

The Manifesto, also called Shaker Manifesto, Shaker and Shakeress, and The Shaker, was a newspaper published monthly by the Shakers from 1871 to 1899. It contained articles on Shaker theology, history, music, poetry, domestic life, death notices, and advertisements, serving as a way to connect the Shaker communities as well as inform non-Shakers.

== History ==
The Manifesto was originally was published out of Watervliet Shaker Community as The Shaker from 1871 to 1872. Elder George Albert Lomas was the first editor of the paper. Following a fire at Watervliet, editorial duties were transferred to Elder Frederick W. Evans and Eldress Antoinette Doolittle of the Mount Lebanon Shaker community. Elder George Lomas retained publishing duties. During this time, the title of the paper was changed to Shaker and Shakeress. Due to internal conflicts concerning Elder Evans' liberal views on topics like vegetarianism, pacifism, women's rights, and other social or political issues heavily influencing the output of the paper, Elder Lomas resumed editorial duties in 1876. The paper reverted back to the title The Shaker, and Nicholas A. Briggs of Canterbury Shaker Village became the publisher. In 1878, the name of the paper was changed to Shaker Manifesto, and in 1882 Elder Henry C. Blinn of Canterbury became its editor. In 1884, the title was shortened to The Manifesto, and by 1887 the paper was entirely produced at Canterbury. The final issue of The Manifesto was published in 1899.

== Music ==
Original Shaker music was among the newspaper's most popular features; however, for consumption by the public, the music had to be transcribed out of the original Shaker notation which was not written with a staff. After the first two years, music was a monthly feature until 1895. From 1879 to 1881, the music was hand-set by the sisters at Mount Lebanon.

Examples of music published in The Manifesto
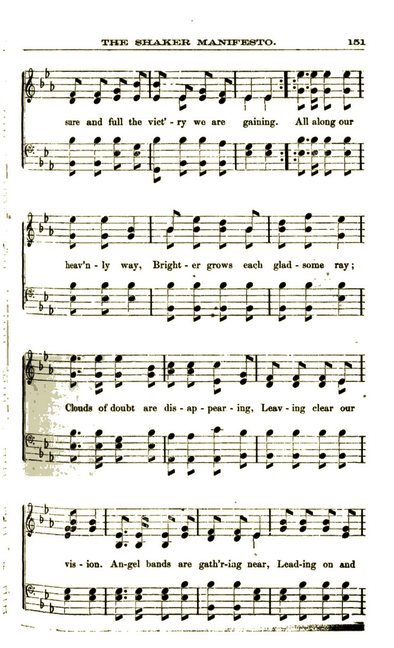
"Our Father's Kingdom" by James G. Russell

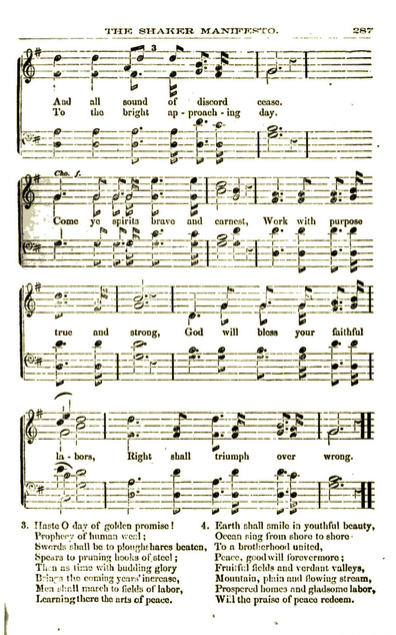
"Peaceful Victory" by Martha J. Anderson

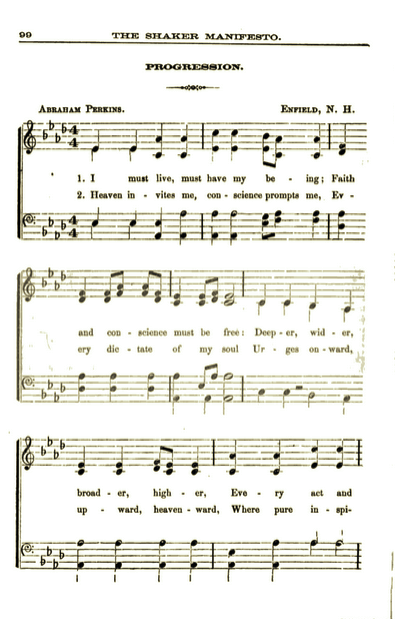
"Progression" by Abraham Perkins

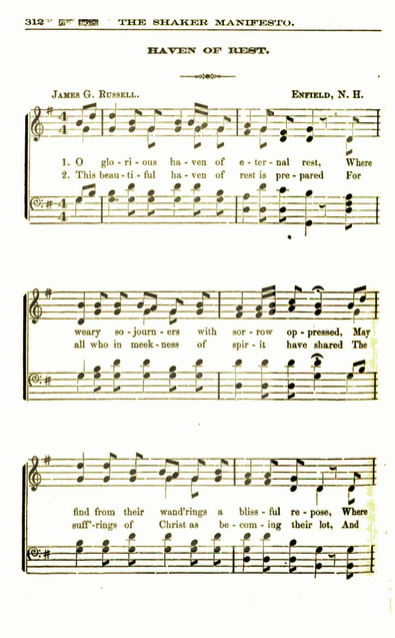
"Haven of Rest" by James G. Russell
