= Watervliet (town), New York =

Former town in New York, United States

Watervliet (/wɔːtərˈvliːt/ waw-tər-VLEET or /wɔːtərvəˈliːt/ waw-tər-və-LEET) was a town that at its height encompassed most of present-day Albany County and most of the current town of Niskayuna in neighboring Schenectady County, in the state of New York, United States. Just prior to its dissolution, the town encompassed the current towns of Colonie and Green Island and the city of Watervliet.

== History ==
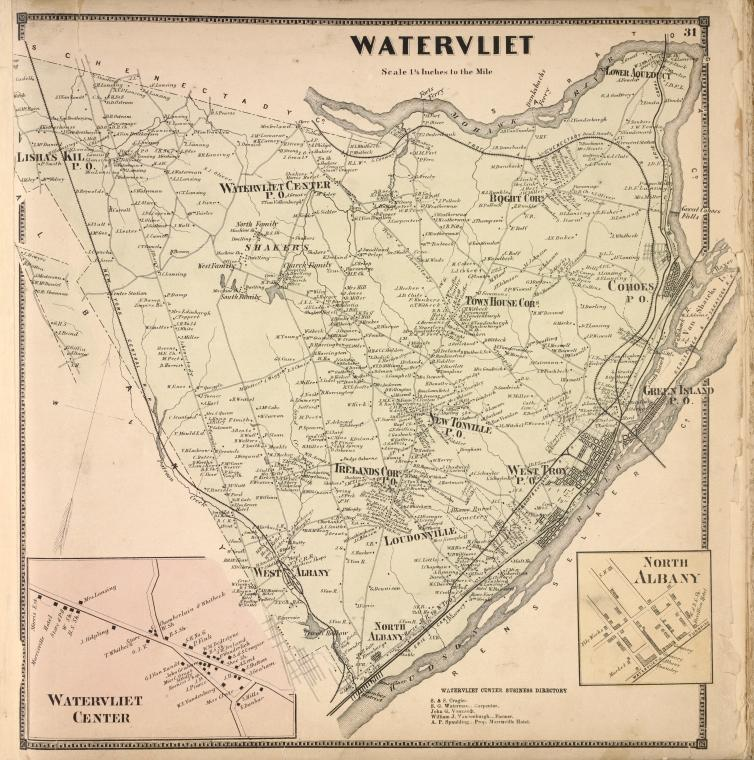
Town of Watervliet in 1866

Watervliet Historical Populations
Year	Pop.	±%
1790	7,419	—
1800	5,012	−32.4%
1810	2,365	−52.8%
1820	2,806	+18.6%
1830	4,962	+76.8%
1840	10,141	+104.4%
1850	10,675	+5.3%
1860	25,449	+138.4%
1870	22,609	−11.2%
1880	22,220	−1.7%
1890	24,709	+11.2%

On March 7, 1788, the state of New York divided the entire state into towns, eliminating districts as administrative units by passing New York Laws of 1788, Chapters 63 and 64. This transformed the Western District of the Manor of Rensselaerswyck into the town of Watervliet. In the census of 1790, the town had a population of 7,419, which made it twice as populous as the city of Albany.

The European settlement of Watervliet predated the creation of the town by almost 200 years. Fort Nassau on Castle Island was built by Dutch colonists in 1614 within the original boundaries of the town. It passed to the town of Bethlehem upon its creation in 1793, later to be annexed to the city of Albany in the 20th century. Early settlers were Dutch farmers owning land north and south of Fort Orange along the Hudson River. The lands to the north came to be known as Watervliet, while the lands to the south were named Bethlehem.

The town had been settled by many immigrant groups who settled different regions of the town. In the western section of the town, in what would later become the town of Berne, Germans from the 1750s and Scots during the US Revolutionary War settled around the Helderberg Escarpment.

Over the next 20 years, several towns would be broken off from this town, often called the "Mother of Towns". Rensselaerville in 1790 would be the first town separated, Coeymans would separate in 1791, while Colonie would be incorporated as a municipality but would stay within Watervliet. Bethlehem would be created in 1793 from Watervliet. Colonie would become incorporated again, this time as a district in 1801. Guilderland would separate in 1803, and Colonie would become a village in 1804 and then a separate town in 1808. Niskayuna would separate in 1809, when Schenectady County was broken off from Albany County. In 1815 Colonie would be split between the city of Albany and the town of Watervliet. In 1836 West Troy would incorporate as a village, Cohoes in 1848, and then Green Island in 1853 also as a village. Cohoes would be set off from the town as a city in 1869. In 1870 the portion of the former town of Colonie that Watervliet received in 1815 was annexed by the city of Albany. In 1870–71 the city of Albany west of Magazine Street (the so-called "Liberty" of Albany) was given by the state to the town of Watervliet. The town however was unwilling to accept the territory and subsequently ceded the territory to the neighboring town of Guilderland. At this same time the city of Albany annexed from Watervliet the hamlet of North Albany.

In the 1890s the rural residents of the majority of the town of Watervliet became dissatisfied with being under the political control of the urban residents of the village of West Troy. When talk began of the creation of a city of Watervliet, they petitioned the state to be set apart as a separate town. In 1895 the state legislature passed laws of 1895 chapter 975, which established the town of Colonie from the majority of the town of Watervliet, leaving behind only the villages of Green Island and West Troy within the town of Watervliet. In the next year, the original town was dissolved. The laws of 1896 chapter 811, which went into effect on May 21, created the town of Green Island to cover the village of the same name, leaving only the village of West Troy in the town of Watervliet. On August 1, 1896, the village of West Troy, along with some land from the town of Colonie, was incorporated as the independent city of Watervliet, and the town of Watervliet was ended.

=== Watervliet v. Colonie ===
After the town of Colonie was created but prior to the dissolution of the town of Watervliet into the city of Watervliet and town of Green Island, the town of Watervliet filed a lawsuit against the new town of Colonie to enforce the state law's division of debt payments between the two towns. Before Town of Watervliet v. Town of Colonie could go to trial, the town of Watervliet was dissolved. Chapter 905 of the laws of 1896 creating the city of Watervliet stated that any land in the town of Watervliet not incorporated into the new city would form a "distinct and separate town" and, after a boundary survey, uninhabited strips of land totaling less than 3 acres (12,000 m^{2}) were found. Representatives of the town of Watervliet argued that it still existed and could continue the lawsuit. The Supreme Court of Albany County, Appellate Division, 3rd Department on March 2, 1898 ruled that the town of Watervliet ceased to exist on August 1, 1896 with the formation of the city; it said that the legislature could not have intended to have a town consisting of uninhabited shreds of discontinuous territory. The court declared that when the state dissolves a town and replaces it with a new city, the new municipality succeeds to the property of the old town; therefore, the court declared these strips of land to be of the city of Watervliet. Also, the court ruled that the officeholders of the town of Watervliet could not be officeholders of the town anymore; as they no longer lived within the town of Watervliet, they had no legal standing to sue in the name of the town. The former offices of the town had existed only to wind up its affairs. Since the court ruled that the town no longer existed, the case was dismissed.

== Notable locations found in the town ==
- The Watervliet Arsenal, founded in 1813, is the oldest Federal arsenal in the country; it is the sole manufacturing facility for large caliber cannon.
- The route of the original Erie Canal from the town's border with the city of Albany (today in the neighborhood of North Albany within the city) north to modern-day Cohoes and then northwest to the Lower Aqueduct, today the US Route 9 Crescent Bridge over the Mohawk River. The junction of the Erie with the Champlain Canal was also in the town.
- Troy & Schenectady Railroad
- The first Shaker village, Watervliet Shaker Historic District

== Notable residents ==
- Myndert and Carsten Van Iveren, among the first settlers of the area, barons, and members of the Van Watervliet family in the Dutch Republic. Their family estate in Goes, Netherlands, may be the town's namesake.
- Leland Stanford, future governor of California, United States Senator, and founder of Stanford University
- Ann Lee, leader of the Niskayuna Shaker settlement
