= Union Village Shaker settlement =

Coordinates: 39.437°N 84.303°W

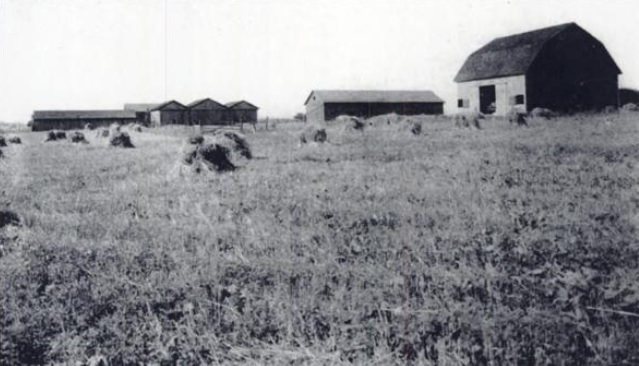
Barns at West Family lot, Union Village Shaker settlement, 1916

The Union Village Shaker settlement was a village organized by Shakers in Turtlecreek Township, Warren County, Ohio.

== Shaker settlement ==
The Union Village Shaker settlement was a community of Shakers founded at Turtle Creek, Ohio, in 1805. Early leaders sent out from the Shakers' central Ministry at New Lebanon, New York, included Elder David Darrow (1750-1825), who began evangelizing in 1805, and Eldress Ruth Farrington (1763-1821), who arrived in 1806 to help stabilize the new Shaker society. An early and influential proselyte was Richard McNemar (1770-1839), who was a central figure among western Shakers for many years.

== Early members ==
The believers at Turtlecreek signed their first covenant in March 1810. The signers, separated according to sex, included these brethren: David Darrow, Daniel Mosely, Solomon King, Peter Pease, Archibald Meacham, Benjamin Seth Youngs, Issachar Bates, Elisha Dennis, Barachah Dennis, Ross Morrell, James Hodges, Nathan Sharp, Henry Morrell, John Carson, and Joseph Lockwood.

The sisters who signed the covenant were Ruth Farrington, Molly Goodrich, Ruth Darrow, Lucy Bacon, Rachel Johnson, Hortency Goodrich, Martha Sanford, Edith Dennis, Eunice Bedle, Caty Rubert, Susanna Liddil, Polly Thomas, Jenny McNemar, Polly Davis, Hannah Carson, Rachel Duncan, Rachel Dennis, and Phebe Lockwood.

== Ohio Bishopric Ministry ==
Until 1910, Union Village was the bishopric, or governing unit, for other Shaker villages in Ohio, including the Whitewater Shaker Settlement and the Watervliet Shaker village. After 1862, the Shaker settlement at North Union also came under Union Village's administration. After 1889, the Union Village bishopric ministry oversaw all societies in Kentucky and Ohio.

Shakers were led by gender-balanced teams of elders and eldresses. These individuals were suggested by local consensus and their selection was approved by the Shakers' central Ministry in New Lebanon, New York. Every bishopric's ministry was supposed to oversee the Shaker societies under their jurisdiction and keep an eye on the leaders of all the families, but this system did not always work as intended (see Joseph Slingerland, below).

From 1812 to 1821, David Darrow and his assistant Solomon King were the Ohio bishopric elders, serving with Ruth Farrington and Racel Johnson,

In 1830, the Ohio bishopric ministry included Solomon King and his assistant Joshua Worley on the brethren's side, and Rachel Johnson and Nancy McNemar on the sisters' side.

In 1836 and 1837, Freegift Wells, Betsey Hastings, and Sally Sharp were in the bishopric ministry.

In 1840, Freegift Wells and Betsy Hastings were the lead elder and eldress; their assistants were John Martin and Sally Sharp.

In 1852, the Ohio ministry were John Martin, William Reynolds, Sally Sharp, and Naomi Legier.

In 1860, Aaron Babbit and Sally Sharp led the Ohio bishopric ministry, assisted by Peter Boyd, and Naomi Ligier

In 1864, the Ohio bishopric ministry team consisted of Aaron Babbitt, Cephas Holloway, Sally Sharp, and Naomi Legier.

In 1875, the Ohio ministry were William Reynolds, Amos Parkhurst, Naomi Legier, and Adaline Wells.

In 1881, Ohio bishopric ministry included Matthew Carter, Oliver Hampton, Louisa Farnham, and Adaline Wells. They were still in office in 1887.

== Membership decline ==
In 1818, Union Village was one of the largest Shaker settlements, with a population over 600, but by the 1830s there was a significant reduction in adult membership, which was exacerbated in 1838 and 1839 due to strife among the members over ideological differences and accusations during the early years of Mother Ann's Work, also called the Era of Manifestations.

As their membership dropped, Elder Oliver C. Hampton (1817-1901) began publishing spiritual works and poetry about the Shaker sect to attract people to the sect. Even so, by the 1870s the community did not have enough adult members to do the work required to support the village's farms and industries which included broom making, garden seeds, medicinal herbs and extracts.

== Later years ==
In the 1880s, contrary to the Shaker Millennial Laws, they were increasingly in debt. About 1882 James Fennessey joined the community and soon implemented a plan to rent out land to farmers to create a revenue stream. In 1892 the North Union site was sold for $316,000 which was intended to pay off the debts incurred during the previous two decades. The money was mismanaged, though, by Joseph Slingerland. He spent about $500,000 on property purchases, improvements, and renovations, including building an ornate trustees' Office, now called Marble Hall. Contrary to Shaker practice, Slingerland mortgaged the Watervliet, Ohio, Shaker site to compensate for the expenditures and debt. Fennessey became a trustee and by 1902 had Slingerland removed from the Ohio ministry and filed suit against him and an eldress. By 1908 the Union Village ministry was free of debt.

In 1898 Elder Oliver Hampton attempted to create a settlement in Georgia at White Oak to create momentum for the flagging endeavor. However, Hampton died while on a visit there, and with his death came the end to the new settlement.

Hundreds joined the Shakers, who believed that Christ had already appeared for the second time in the person of Mother Ann Lee. The "Advents'" impact was greatest on the Shaker villages at Union Village and Whitewater, Ohio, Harvard, Massachusetts, and Canterbury, New Hampshire. Some remained Shakers for the rest of their lives; others left after a short time.

== Wisdom's Paradise ==
In December 2004, United States Senator from Ohio, Rob Portman, and Cheryl Bauer published a book on the 19th century Shaker community at Union Village. The book was titled Wisdom's Paradise: The Forgotten Shakers of Union Village. At the end of the twelfth chapter, "An Eternal Sabbath, A Restless Peace," Portman summarizes the dual aspects of Shaker impacts at the close of their way of life at Union Village as both warming to mainstream worldly culture and detrimental to long established order:

Intentionally or unintentionally, the Believers were influencing society in many ways. Little by little, they were becoming more similar to their neighbors. The trend made them more acceptable to society, but in retrospect may have contributed to their demise in Warren County. In economic affairs, they increasingly adapted the methods of the world: taking out loans, using mass marketing techniques. Those strategies sometimes compromised inherent Shaker principles of self-sufficiency and modesty. The Believers were no longer the radical group that attracted people who hungered for a different kind of faith; they were becoming a part of mainstream society.

== Correctional institutions ==
The Lebanon Correctional Institution and the Warren Correctional Institution, which are adjacent to one another, were built upon land that had been part of the Shaker settlement.

== See also ==
- Millennial Praises
