= Watervliet Shaker Historic District =

Historic district in New York, United States

- U.S. National Register of Historic Places
- U.S. Historic district
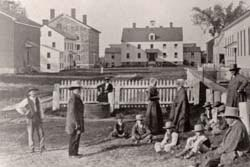
- Watervliet Shaker village, Albany, New York, circa 1870, Courtesy of Shaker Heritage Society

- Location within New York Location within the United States
- Location: Watervliet Shaker Rd., Colonie, New York
- Coordinates: 42°44′23″N 73°49′6″W
- Built: 1775
- Architectural style: Shaker Style
- NRHP reference No.: 73001160 (original); 73002247 (increase)
- Added to NRHP: February 20, 1973 (original); September 20, 1973 (increase)

Watervliet Shaker Historic District, in Colonie, New York, is the site of the first Shaker community, established in 1776. The primary Shaker community, the Mount Lebanon Shaker Society, was started a bit later. Watervliet's historic 1848 Shaker meetinghouse has been restored and is used for public events, such as concerts.

The founder of the Shakers, Mother Ann Lee, is buried here.

It was listed on the National Register of Historic Places in 1973, and the listing was expanded later in the same year. Albany International Airport was constructed on the community's herb garden.

At the time it was founded it was located in the Town of Watervliet, which went out of existence in 1896. Since then it has been in the Town of Colonie, roughly ten miles from the modern City of Watervliet.

== Community ==
The Shakers, who believed that spiritual ties were more significant than blood relationships, organized the community at Watervliet into four large "families," each of which formed an independent, self-supporting unit with its own buildings, although all members worshiped in the same meetinghouse. They were known as the "Church," "North," "West," and "South" families. At its high point, the community had 350 members and 2,500 acres (10 km^{2}) of land.

In the early 19th-century, a custody battle involving a father who had gone to live at Watervliet with his minor child was widely publicized. The negative publicity caused the Shakers to establish a rule that married persons would not be accepted into Shaker communities unless both partners agreed to enter.

== Buildings ==
The original buildings were log cabins; however, the oldest surviving buildings date to 1820. Each "family" house had a basement, 3 living floors, and an attic. Kitchens, including the large kitchens for baking and canning, were located in the basement. Each house had a wing for "sisters" and a wing for "brothers," with separate staircases; the wings were separated by a large hall. Not only bedrooms, but sitting rooms were separate. Both sexes shared the dining and meeting rooms, but sat on opposite sides of the room. Typically, two to six believers of the same sex shared a bedchamber. The buildings of the North family burned to the ground in 1920. Other buildings were lost to neglect, or torn down over the years. Twenty-two buildings survive.

Collectively, the buildings at Watervliet are regarded as among the finest and best-preserved surviving Shaker buildings.

=== Meeting House ===
The 1848 meetinghouse replaced a 1791 meetinghouse. It is a plain, wooden building decorated according to the Shaker rule that "Meetinghouses should be painted white without, and of a bluish shade within." It was the only white building in the community, since, according to Shaker rules, "no buildings may be painted white, save meeting houses." Three doors on the building's northern side provided separate entrances tor the brothers, the sisters, and the members of the ministry, who used the center door. The meetinghouse was located in the center of the village and it served as the home of the ministers. The austere interior provided a large floor space for the dancing that was a central part of Shaker worship.

== Economy ==
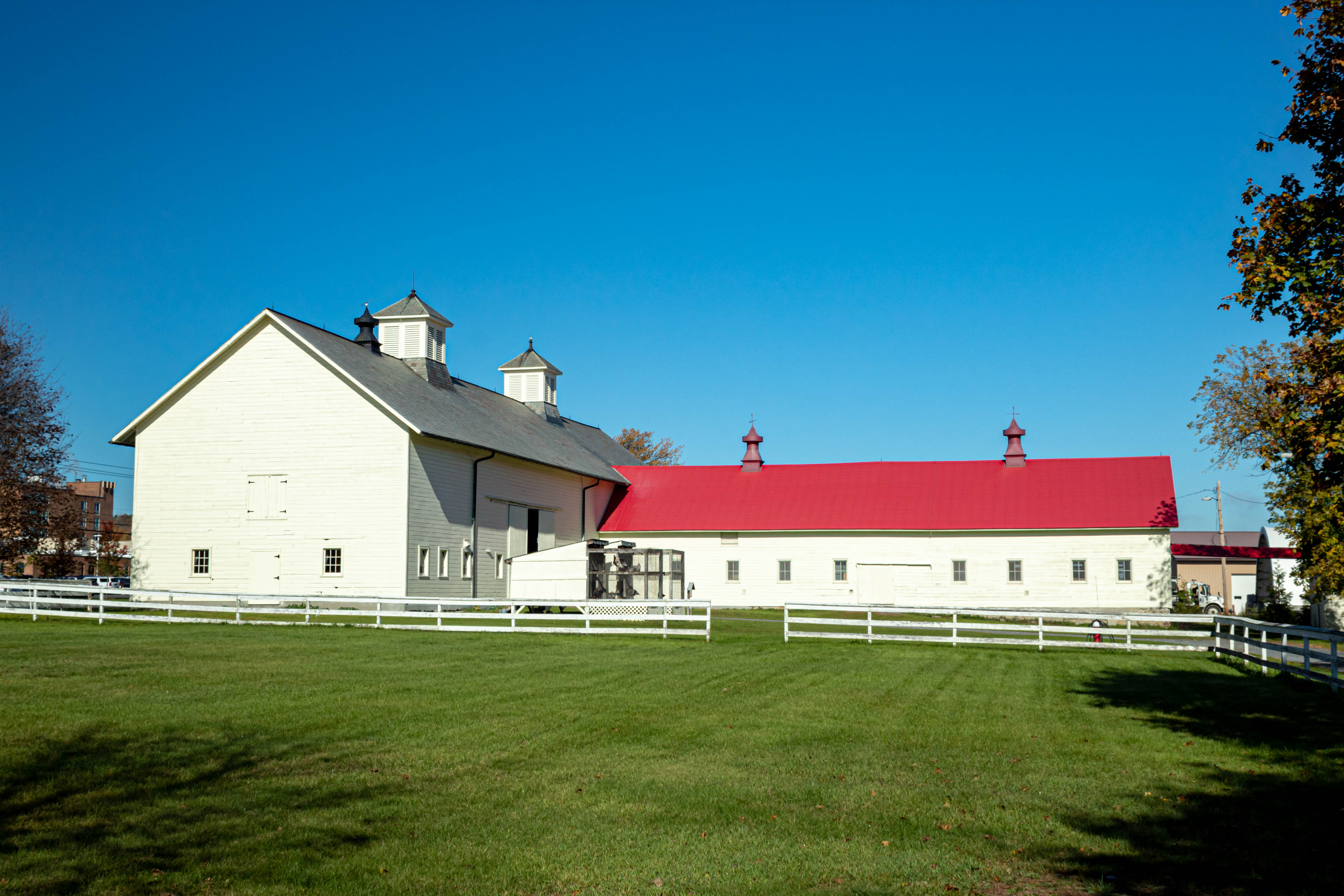
Watervliet Shaker Barn

The Watervliet Shakers, like all Shaker communities, were almost self-sufficient, raising their own food and producing their own clothing and machinery. They purchased a limited range of goods from outsiders, principally iron, which they worked into hardware and tools in their own workshops.

Each village also produced market goods for outside sale. The Watervliet Shakers had a tannery, produced brooms for sale in volume, and had a small industry manufacturing brass, steel and silver writing pens, but they are most noted in business history as having been among the first producers of garden seeds as a commercial product in the United States and the first Shaker community to have produced and sold seeds. It has been claimed that a member of this community, Theodore Bates, invented the flat broom, older brooms having been fashioned as round bundles of broom corn straw or twigs.

=== Seed business ===
The Watervliet seed business is known to have been highly profitable at least as early as 1811. Prior to this time, individuals saved vegetable seeds from the previous year, or traded with neighbors. The Watervliet Shakers are thought to have been the first seed sellers to package seeds in small, paper envelopes.

== See also ==
- Watervliet (town), New York
