= Mount Lebanon Shaker Society =

- U.S. National Register of Historic Places
- U.S. National Historic Landmark
- New York State Register of Historic Places
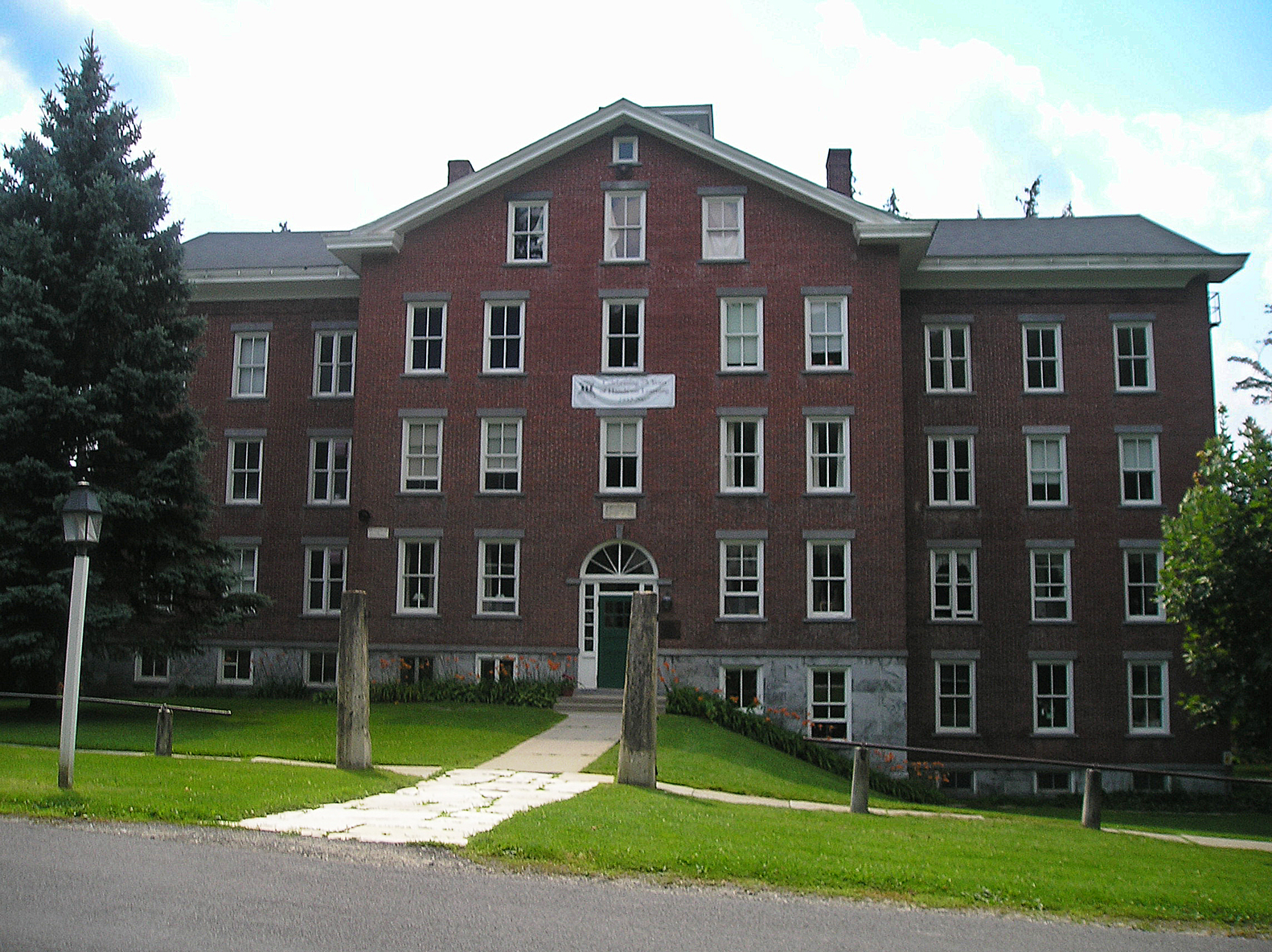
- Main dwelling circa July 2008
- Location: New Lebanon, New York
- Coordinates: 42°27′9.18″N 73°22′50.37″W
- Built: 1785
- NRHP reference No.: 66000511
- NYSRHP No.: 02115.000034

Significant dates
- Added to NRHP: October 15, 1966
- Designated NHL: June 23, 1965
- Designated NYSRHP: June 23, 1980

Mount Lebanon Shaker Society, also known as New Lebanon Shaker Society, was a communal settlement of spiritual Shakers in New Lebanon, New York, United States. The earliest converts began to "gather in" at that location in 1782 and built their first meetinghouse in 1785. The early Shaker Ministry, including Joseph Meacham and Lucy Wright, the architects of Shakers' gender-balanced government, lived there.

Isaac N. Youngs, the society's scribe, chronicled the life of this Shaker village for almost half a century. Youngs also designed the schoolhouse built there in 1839.

Holy Mount, where Shaker services were held, has a spur ridge which has been called Mount Lebanon.

In addition to the Shakers' central Ministry, notable residents at Mount Lebanon's North Family included Elder Frederick W. Evans, known for his public preaching, and his partner, Eldress Antoinette Doolittle, who was succeeded by Anna White, M. Catherine Allen artists Sarah Bates, Rebecca Landon, and Polly Anne Reed.

The North Family was also known for publishing a book of poetry, Mount Lebanon Cedar Boughs: original poems by the North family of Shakers, Anna White, ed. (Buffalo: Peter Paul Company, 1895), with a number of poems by Cecilia Devere and Martha Anderson.

== Membership ==
In 1787, the Church Family (the First Order plus the Second Order) housed 57 male and 48 female Shakers, for a total of 105. In 1789, the Church Family's two orders housed 117 male and 116 female Shakers, for a total of 233. Numbers fluctuated according to the state of the economy and the vigor of Shaker missionaries; hard times increased membership, but rarely did the numbers reach that high again. The total dropped to 130 in 1806, then gradually rose to 240 in 1843 (111 males and 129 females) in the Church Family.

The Shakers used a controversial practice of adopting children and using them as servants and labor. The 1875 New York State Census lists many children as 'servants'. The 1892 New York State census lists many as 'inmates'

From that point, membership eroded further. In 1879, the Church Family housed only 54 male and 88 female Shakers, for a total of 142. The closing of smaller communities and consolidation into the larger villages postponed dissolution for several decades.

In the 1940s, due to aging members and declining membership, the Shakers sold the site to Darrow School. Throughout the subsequent years, the site has been managed by several different owners. Darrow owns what remains of the Church and Center Families, while Shaker Museum | Mount Lebanon manages preservation and operates tours of the North Family; the rest of the buildings of remaining Families are privately owned.

== Buildings ==
Mount Lebanon's main building became a National Historic Landmark in 1965.

Although the first of the Shaker settlements in the U.S. was in the Watervliet Shaker Historic District, Mount Lebanon became the leading Shaker society, and was the first to have a building used exclusively for religious purposes. Benson Lossing documented that meetinghouse and a few other buildings when he visited the Shakers in 1856.

Mount Lebanon is located where Shaker Rd. merges with Darrow Rd. off US 20 in New Lebanon, New York. The North Family buildings are preserved as the Shaker Museum.

State historical marker in front of Meetinghouse

Oblique view of Meetinghouse

Side view of main dwelling

== See also ==
- Shaker tilting chair
- Frederick William Evans
