= The Testament of Ann Lee =

2025 film by Mona Fastvold

- Theatrical release poster
- Directed by: Mona Fastvold
- Written by: Mona Fastvold; Brady Corbet
- Produced by: Andrew Morrison; Joshua Horsfield; Viktória Petrányi; Mona Fastvold; Brady Corbet; Gregory Jankilevitsch; Klaudia Śmieja-Rostworowska; Lillian LaSalle; Mark Lampert
- Starring: Amanda Seyfried; Thomasin McKenzie; Lewis Pullman; Stacy Martin; Tim Blake Nelson; Christopher Abbott
- Narrated by: Thomasin McKenzie
- Cinematography: William Rexer
- Edited by: Sofía Subercaseaux
- Music by: Daniel Blumberg
- Production companies: Annapurna Pictures; Kaplan Morrison; Intake Films; Mid March Media; FirstGen; Mizzel Media; Yintai Entertainment; ArtClass Films; Carte Blanche; Parable
- Distributed by: Searchlight Pictures
- Release dates: 1 September 2025 (Venice); 25 December 2025 (United States); 27 February 2026 (United Kingdom)
- Running time: 137 minutes
- Countries: United Kingdom; United States
- Language: English
- Budget: $11 million
- Box office: $4.2 million

The Testament of Ann Lee (Note: Titled on-screen as The Testament of Ann Lee or The Woman Clothed By The Sun With The Moon Under Her Feet) is a 2025 historical musical drama film directed by Mona Fastvold, who co-wrote it with Brady Corbet. The film stars Amanda Seyfried as Ann Lee, the founding leader of the Shakers religious sect in the 18th century. It also stars Thomasin McKenzie, Lewis Pullman, Stacy Martin, Tim Blake Nelson, and Christopher Abbott in supporting roles.

The Testament of Ann Lee premiered in the main competition of the 82nd Venice International Film Festival on 1 September 2025, where it was nominated for the Golden Lion. Its limited theatrical release from Searchlight Pictures began in the United States on 25 December and the United Kingdom on 27 February 2026. The film received positive reviews from critics, with Seyfried receiving acclaim for her performance (often described as "career-best") and earning nominations for the Critics' Choice Movie Award for Best Actress and the Golden Globe Award for Best Actress in a Motion Picture – Musical or Comedy.

== Plot ==
Ann Lee is born in Manchester in 1736 ("The Testament of Ann Lee"). During childhood, she and her younger brother William work at a cotton factory. One night, she witnesses her parents having sex and associates the act with sin; during a meal, she says she knows what her father does to her mother, and her father beats her hands with a switch. As she grows older, she becomes more pious and takes a job as a cook at a local infirmary. One day, she, William, and their niece Nancy visit the home of Jane and James Wardley, former Quakers who preach that Jesus's Second Coming will be a woman and embrace public confession of sin and impromptu shouting, dance, and song as part of worship. Ann becomes a fixture within the group of "Shaking Quakers" and marries fellow believer Abraham ("Worship"). Ann's trepidations around sex are worsened by her husband's interest in sadomasochism and oral sex as well as the tragic death of all four of their children in early infancy ("Beautiful Treasures").

Eventually, the Shakers sufficiently unnerve the locals and disturb the peace, including interruption of a church service, that authorities arrest Ann and imprison her for 14 days. During this time, she refuses to eat or drink ("I Never Did Believe"). She has a vision of herself levitating, and of Adam and Eve in the Garden of Eden, which she takes to mean that original sin was fornication and therefore humanity must abstain from sex ("Hunger and Thirst"). She shares this with other Shaker leaders and they determine she must be the female Messiah they were awaiting, renaming her "Mother Ann." William ends his secret homosexual relationship with his lover, cuts his hair as Ann directed, and commits to supporting her.

After an angry crowd injures Ann and her followers, they elect to leave Britain for New England, funded by Hocknell, a wealthy farmer. They sail aboard the Mariah. During the voyage, Nancy becomes enamored with new convert Richard, Hocknell's son ("Today Today"). Despite sometimes threatening mockery of their rituals by the crew, Ann helps keep up morale during a violent storm and earns the crew's respect ("All is Summer"). Upon arriving in New York City, Ann sends William and other men north to find land for their community. The men are guided by a vision experienced by Hocknell after three days of prayer which includes his finger wagging uncontrollably; this shaking digit points him to the meadowland site ("John's Running Song"). During the months spent waiting to hear back from the men, Nancy, following an assignation with Richard in a privy discovered by his father, leaves the community to marry Richard. Abraham leaves Ann, frustrated with their marriage and lack of sex, demands that another female believer perform oral sex on him while Ann turns her back in disgust.

That spring, Ann and the others rejoin William in Niskayuna where they have begun developing a settlement. William is sent out to preach at other established communities ("Bow Down O Zion"). The population of Niskayuna steadily grows with converts and foundling children who are adopted into the community ("I Love Mother"). This number also shows the development of the Shaker aesthetic in furniture and architecture as well as some of the items invented by Shakers.

Ann is arrested by the Continental Army for insisting their community remain neutral during the war ("Stone Prison"). After being freed by the sympathetic Governor of New York George Clinton, she travels around New England, establishing Shaker communities, though some people suspect her of witchcraft.

Ann recruits new followers at a local farm where they are attacked by an angry mob. The farm is burned down and several Shakers are beaten, some fatally so. Ann, while telling the Shakers not to retaliate, is stripped naked below the waist by men who question her gender, calling her "eunuch" and "it" before pronouncing that she "has the proper parts" but is not a woman. They also accuse her of witchcraft. Badly injured, Ann recalls her childhood with William during their journey home ("Down to the Deep"). William dies shortly after, while prominent follower (and the movie's narrator) Mary is blinded in her left eye. A year later, Ann, who never recovered from the attack, dies at age 48. As she dies, she has a vision that she is reunited with her brother and children in Heaven. She is buried in the village, now a thriving and self-sustaining religious community ("Beautiful Treasures Funeral"). The credits mention the peak population of various Shaker communities (estimated at 6,000 in 1840), and that there are only two Shakers left as of July 2025 (Note: This number later rose to 3 total Shakers as of August 2025.) ("Clothed by the Sun").

== Cast ==
- Amanda Seyfried as Ann Lee
  - Esmee Hewett and Millie Rose Crossley as 6-year-old and 12-year-old Ann
- Lewis Pullman as William Lee, Ann's brother
  - Benjamin Bagota and Harry Conway as 4-year-old and 10-year-old William
- Thomasin McKenzie as Mary Partington, Ann's closest friend, who is also the film's narrator
- Matthew Beard as James Whittaker
- Christopher Abbott as Abraham Standerin, Ann's husband
- Viola Prettejohn as Nancy Lee, Ann's niece
- Stacy Martin as Jane Wardley
- Scott Handy as James Wardley, Jane's husband
- David Cale as John Hocknell
- Jamie Bogyo as Richard Hocknell
- Tim Blake Nelson as Pastor Reuben Wright
- Daniel Blumberg as Deacon Talmadge Bishop
- Willem Van Der Vegt as Ann and William's father
- Maria Sand as Ann and William's mother
- Alexis Latham as Mr. Cunningham
- Shannon Woodward as Mrs. Cunningham
- Matti Boustedt as Captain Smith

== Production ==
=== Development ===
Director Mona Fastvold conceived the idea for the film after discovering a Shaker hymn while wrapping her second film, The World to Come (2020). Fastvold stated that the project initially struggled due to "zero interest" from the industry.

=== Casting ===
Regarding the casting of Amanda Seyfried as Ann Lee, Fastvold stated, "Amanda has a lot of power. She's really strong. She is a wonderful mother. She is a little mad, and so I knew that she could access those things. She could access the kindness, the gentleness, the tenderness, and she could also access this power and this madness."

=== Filming ===
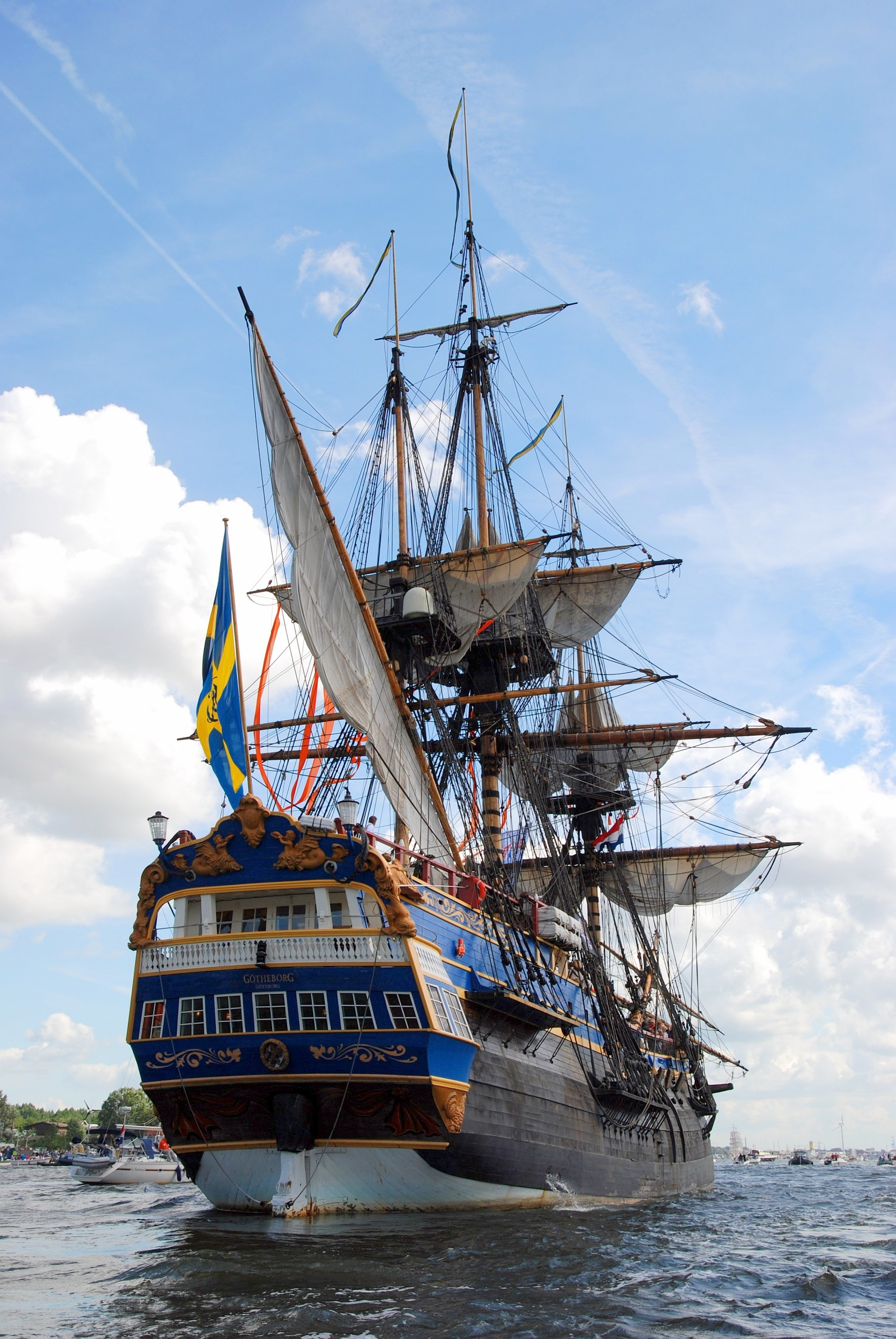
Ann Lee and her followers' voyage to America was shot aboard the replica ship Götheborg.

Principal photography took place in Budapest, with two days of filming also taking place aboard the replica ship Götheborg, which was docked in Gothenburg. Like The Brutalist (2024), which was co-written by Fastvold and directed by her longtime partner, Brady Corbet, the film was shot on 35 mm film stock. Corbet, who co-wrote Ann Lee, acted as a second unit director on the film. Filming wrapped in December 2024.

Rehearsals took place in New York. Celia Rowlson-Hall, who worked with Corbet on Vox Lux (2018), choreographed the film. As Lee birthed four children (all of whom died in infancy), Fastvold sought to depict the births "as real and direct and graphic and unapologetic as possible" using prosthetic vaginas.

=== Musical numbers ===
Composer Daniel Blumberg drew from original Shaker hymns to write the music for the film. He worked with Fastvold from the pre-production stage to the sound mixing process, describing the film as "one of the most experimental, extreme project[s he has] ever done." The soundtrack also includes three original songs that were written by Blumberg himself.

Regarding her uninhibited singing in the film, Seyfried stated, "A lot of it was animal sounds as opposed to melodic sounds. ... I understood that I didn't have to sound beautiful in a way that is beautiful to me. It was more like a woman on her knees.

The soundtrack details were released on 15 December 2025.

== Release ==
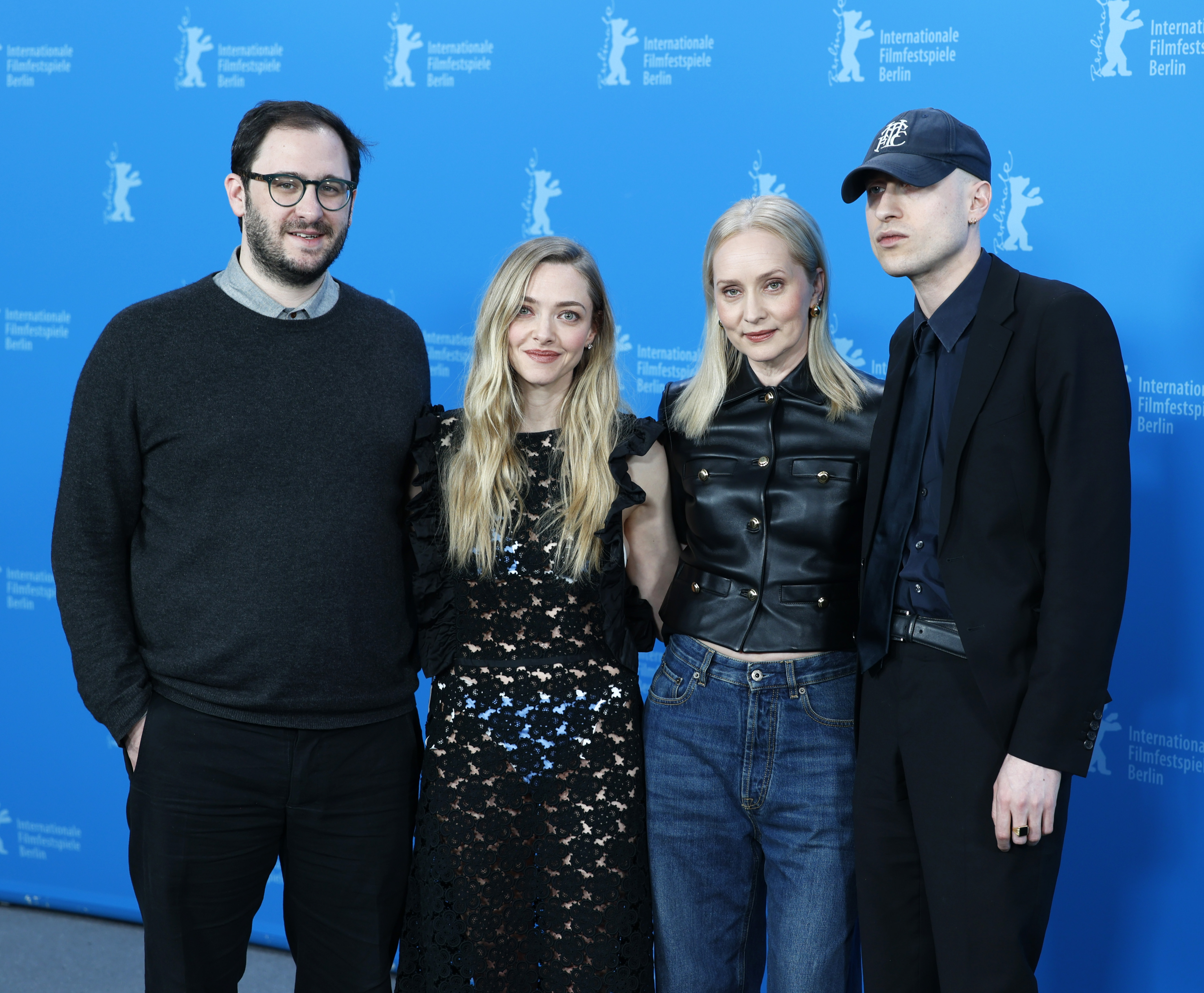
Andrew Morrison, Amanda Seyfried, Mona Fastvold and Daniel Blumberg at the 76th Berlin International Film Festival

A first look was released on 22 July 2025. Charades and CAA Media Finance acquired the sales rights to the film on 26 August 2025.

The film premiered in the main competition of the 82nd Venice International Film Festival on 1 September 2025. It was also screened at the 2025 Toronto International Film Festival, and in the Official Competition at the 2025 BFI London Film Festival on 11 October, and then in the Special Presentations of the 61st Chicago International Film Festival on 16 October 2025. Through September and December 2025, the film was screened at the Zurich Film Festival; the Hamptons International Film Festival; the Woodstock Film Festival; the Montclair Film Festival; the AFI Fest; the Philadelphia Film Festival; the SCAD Savannah Film Festival; Beyond Fest; New Orleans Film Festival; the Austin Film Festival; the Miami Film Festival; the Denver Film Festival; the St. Louis International Film Festival; the Lisbon & Estoril Film Festival; the Inverness Film Festival; the Independent Film Festival Boston; the Virginia Film Festival; the Leeds International Film Festival; the Heartland International Film Festival; the Ojai Playhouse Film Festival; the Santa Fe International Film Festival; the EnergaCAMERIMAGE 2025; the Tahoe Film Festival; and the Sun Valley Film Festival; with some of these screenings presented in 35 mm, 70 mm, and IMAX formats.

In September 2025, Searchlight Pictures acquired distribution rights to the film in North America and several international territories, giving it a limited theatrical release on 70mm film in the United States on 25 December 2025, before expanding wide on 23 January 2026, and later releasing in the United Kingdom on 27 February 2026.

=== Marketing ===
On 6 November 2025, the first teaser trailer made its online debut. The official trailer was released on 7 January 2026.

The first theatrical-release poster was released on 19 November 2025, while a second poster followed on 10 December 2025.

== Reception ==
=== Critical response ===
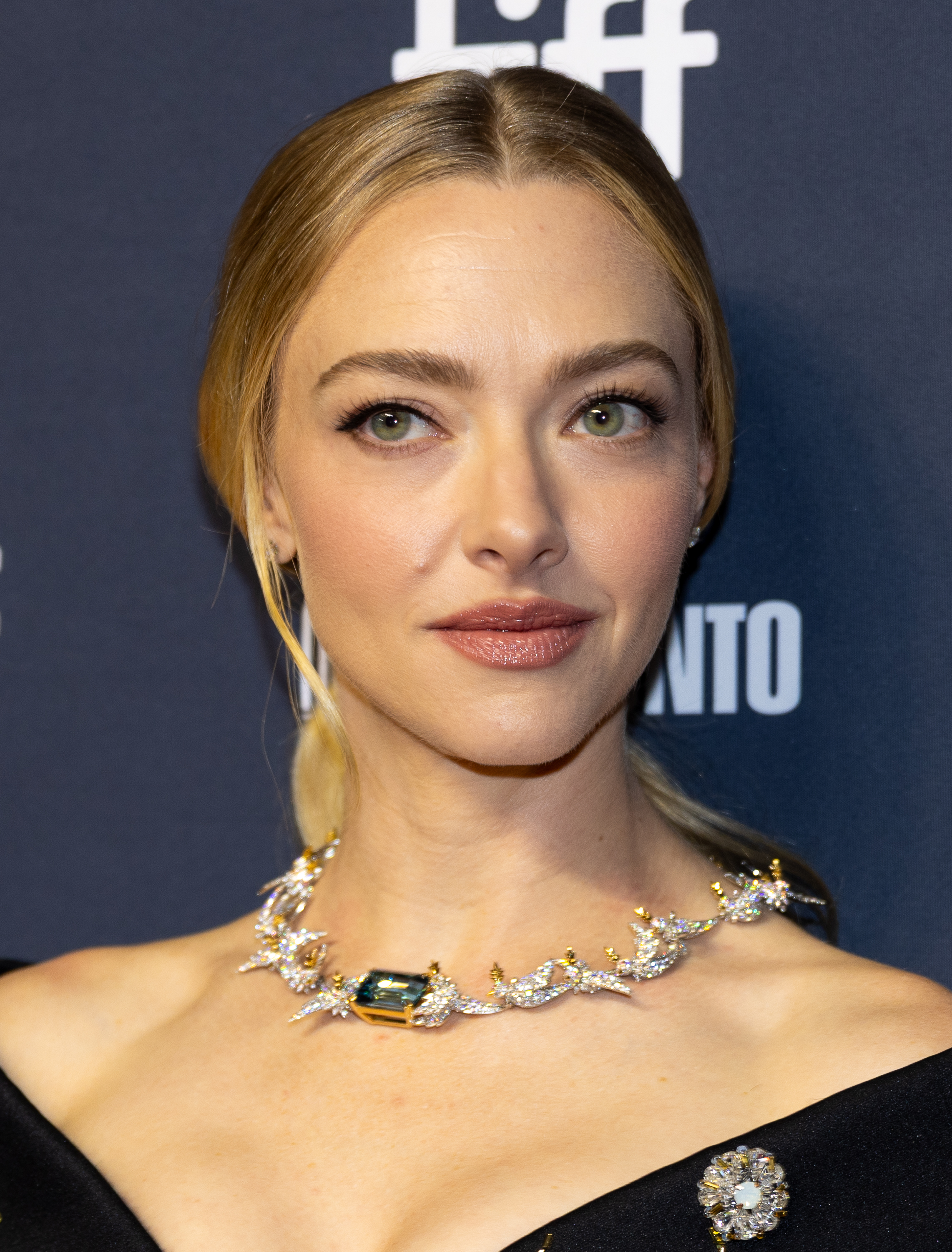
Amanda Seyfried received widespread critical acclaim for her performance, with many deeming it the best of her career.

On the review aggregator website Rotten Tomatoes, 86% of 212 critics' reviews are positive, with an average rating of 7.5/10. The website's consensus reads: "Illuminated by Amanda Seyfried's sterling performance, The Testament of Ann Lee accepts The Shakers' founder on her own terms and reaches its own rhapsodic highs as a result." Metacritic, which uses a weighted average, assigned the film a score of 80 out of 100, based on 43 critics, indicating "generally favorable" reviews.

In his five-star review for The Irish Times, Donald Clarke described the film as "the stuff of masterpieces" and praised Fastvold for "creating a convincing version of Lancashire torn between industrial modernity and apocalyptic mysticism," adding that in the titular role, "Seyfried is electrifying." Meanwhile, Peter Bradshaw of The Guardian rated the film three out of five stars, calling it "a genuinely strange film, elusive in both tone and meaning, one which deploys the obvious effects and rhetorical forms of irony, while at the same time distancing itself from these effects and asking its audience to sympathise with and even admire [Ann] Lee, because she is not supposed to be the villain." Robbie Collin of The Telegraph rated it four out of five stars, calling it "ravishingly staged and thrillingly ambitious" and writing that it "left [him] feeling wobbly and breathless."

David Ehrlich of IndieWire gave the film a grade of A−, calling it "a speculative, feverish, and altogether rapturous biopic," and declaring that Seyfried "gives the best performance of her career." Guy Lodge of Variety wrote, "As a study of unyielding faith practiced on wholly singular terms, it's raptly respectful and intellectually curious, even if, dramatically, it can pall across the course of a languid 136-minute runtime. But it's as a full-blown song-and-dance affair — about the least likely, biggest-swinging shape Lee's story could have taken — that the film is most stunningly persuasive." Lodge further added that Seyfried is "quite dazzling as Ann, the self-made icon, wielding a poised, peaceable, but controlling authority in scene after scene." Awarding the film five stars, Loud and Clear critic Clotilde Chinnici writes that "Seyfried delivers an award-worthy performance as Ann Lee with her layered portrayal of a complex and fascinating woman." She also commends the film’s technical achievements, noting that "the cinematography and the costumes immediately bring us back to mid-18th-century England, and later in the film, the United States."

Writing for Time, Stephanie Zacharek praised Seyfried’s performance, describing her as "remarkable", noting that the film would be "unimaginable with any other actress." Zacharek added that The Testament of Ann Lee is "a movie that takes big chances in a culture that, most days, seems allergic to them." Jack Walters of Screen Rant praised Seyfried, calling her performance "career-best" and stating that she "delivers one of the strongest performances of the entire year in this film." Writer and critic Alfred Castaneda echoed this sentiment, writing that "early in the film, it’s clear that this is the best performance of Amanda Seyfried's career." Further praise for her performance came from Adam Nayman of The Ringer, who noted that "Seyfried powers through a performance that earns its instant tour de force reputation and then some." AwardsWatch's Roberto Ruggio awarded the film an A, affirming that "Angelic and fierce at once, Seyfried gives the performance of a lifetime, ferocious, visceral, and vulnerable, making Ann Lee not just a historical figure from the past, but bringing her alive again." Jeff Ewing of Collider affirmed that Ann Lee is "the role Seyfried was born to play," adding that "it's hard to imagine another person as the controversial figure." Bestowing an A+ grade, Cameron Ritter from InSession Film hailed the film as "the movie of the year," calling Seyfried’s performance "breathtaking" and noting that "her singing and emotional range are on full display." Ritter also commended Pullman’s work as William, describing it as his "best performance to date." Kam Ryan of The Rolling Tape writes that Pullman "proves to be the film’s quiet centerpiece," and, in reflecting on Ann and William’s sibling relationship, observes that "his chemistry with Seyfried is a pleasure to watch." Ryan also concludes that "Seyfried’s luminous performance make it a biopic that lingers long after the credits roll and demands to be seen more than once."

In their compilation of the 11 Best Movie Performances of 2025, TheWrap named Seyfried among them, describing her performance as a "showstopper," while also calling it "spectacular," and stating that she "turns what could have been something more conceptual into a piece that is richly felt and extremely detailed." IndieWire named Seyfried to its list of "The 24 Best Film and TV Performances of 2025", writing that she "plays Lee not as a historical symbol but as a woman wrestling, painfully, with the magnitude of her own calling,” and adding that "she doesn’t just carry the film — she transfigures it into her own image." Meanwhile, in the site's annual critics poll of "Best Performances in 2025", she placed ninth. In their list of "The Best Performances of 2025", The Film Stage ranked Seyfried's performance in the role at No. 10, stating that the actress "seems to direct the camera, guiding it with famously expressive eyes towards gestures untethered to the frame. When she levitates, we join."

Editors at Roger Ebert selected Seyfried for their list of "The Great Performances of 2025" and emphasized that the actress "was gifted the role of a lifetime, and she absolutely delivers in one of the most demanding roles of her entire career." Spectrum Culture cited Seyfried among its selections for the "Best Film Performances of 2025", describing her as a "compelling lead actor" and noting that "you can almost see yourself becoming [Ann Lee's] disciple, despite unwavering chastity, something that actors who play religious figures rarely achieve." Collider also included Seyfried in its The Best Movie Performances of 2025 roster, noting that she "gives her all" in a role that is "emotionally and physically draining, but the actress doesn’t hold back in going where she needs to go to capture the essence of [Ann Lee]".

The film was ranked sixth on The GATE's 100 Best Movies of 2025 list, which highlighted "Seyfried’s revelatory lead performance" and emphasized that it "isn’t just a high point for the actress, but the best performance from anyone all year." Rodrigo Perez of The Playlist wrote that Seyfried's performance "lands as another reminder that Seyfried isn’t just excellent; she’s one of the defining actors of her generation" in the site's list of "The 31 Best Performances of 2025". Other sites such as Yardbarker, When Things Go Pop and FilmBook also included Seyfried in their lists of Best Film Performances of 2025. Additionally, W included Seyfried in their Best Performances issue for 2026, with Lynn Hirschberg noting that "Seyfried embodies the real-life 18th-century founder of the Shaker movement with quiet authority, stripping away the sensationalism often attached to religious leaders."

Floortje Smit, from Dutch newspaper De Volkskrant, wrote, "[the film] is physical experience that moves and alienates." And Alex Mazereeuw from the same newspaper gave 4 stars (of 5 stars) and wrote "It was precisely her compassion and courage that were the keys for me to understand the character."

=== Year-end lists ===
The Testament of Ann Lee has appeared on numerous critics’ annual lists of the best films of 2025, including:

- 1st – Matt Brennan (Los Angeles Times: The Envelope)
- 1st – Stephen Dalton (Sight and Sound)
- 1st – Jake Fittipaldi (The Rolling Tape)
- 1st – Megan McLachlan (The Contending)
- 1st – Coleman Spilde (Salon.com)
- 1st – Jason Shawan (Nashville Scene)
- 2nd – Jackson Weaver (CBC News)
- 2nd – Tim Dams (Screen Daily)
- 2nd – Katherine McLaughlin (Sight and Sound)
- 3rd – Jack Blackwell (BlackwellFilms.com)
- 3rd – Nadia Arain (The Rolling Tape)
- 3rd – Philip Concannon (Sight and Sound)
- 3rd – Max Covill (RogerEbert.com)
- 3rd – Maryann Johanson (Inlander)
- 3rd – Katie Rife (RogerEbert.com)
- 3rd – Lisa Wong Macabasco (Film Comment)
- 3rd – Morgan Roberts (Female Gaze: The Film Club)
- 4th – Ben Dalton (Screen Daily)
- 4th – Jeremy Kay (Screen Daily)
- 4th – Jourdain Searles (RogerEbert.com)
- 5th – Scott Kernen (Awards Daily)
- 5th – Sheri Linden (The Hollywood Reporter)
- 5th – Zach Lewis (Slant Magazine)
- 5th – Adam Patla (The Rolling Tape)
- 5th – Isabel Sandoval (Film Comment)
- 5th – Eden Sapir (Cinema 4 Culture)
- 5th – David Thompson (Sight and Sound)
- 5th – Alissa Wilkinson (The New York Times)
- 6th – Justin Clark (Slant Magazine)
- 6th – Andrew Parker (TheGATE.ca)
- 6th – Josh Parham (Next Best Picture)
- 7th – Derrick Murray (NerdBot)
- 7th – Marc Mohan (Oregon ArtsWatch)
- 8th – Miriam Balanescu (Sight and Sound)
- 8th – Chaz Ebert (RogerEbert.com)
- 8th – Megan Loucks (InSession Film)
- 8th – Adam Nayman (The Ringer)
- 8th – Matt Neglia (Next Best Picture)
- 9th – SlashFilm
- 9th – Monica Castillo (RogerEbert.com)
- 9th – Clayton Dillard (Slant Magazine)
- 9th – David Ehrlich (IndieWire)
- 9th – Malcolm McMillan (Tom's Guide)
- 9th – Kaiya Shunyata (RogerEbert.com)
- 9th – Brandon Wilson (RogerEbert.com)
- 9th – Clint Worthington (RogerEbert.com)
- 10th – William Bibbiani (TheWrap)
- 10th – Natalia Keogan (Film Comment)
- 13th – The A.V. Club
- 16th – Gregory Ellwood, Rodrigo Perez (The Playlist)
- 20th – Beatrice Loayza (Film Comment)
- 27th – The Guardian
- 27th – In Review Online
- 35th – Collider
- 44th – The Film Stage
- Listed alphabetically, not ranked – Gold Derby
- Listed alphabetically, not ranked – Sojourners
- Listed alphabetically, not ranked – Vogue
- Listed alphabetically, not ranked – Erik Anderson (AwardsWatch)
- Listed alphabetically, not ranked – Robert Daniels (Film Comment)
- Listed alphabetically, not ranked – Amelia Harvey (Nerdspin)
- Listed alphabetically, not ranked – Rendy Jones (RogerEbert.com)
- Listed alphabetically, not ranked – Kahlil Joseph (Screen Slate)
- Listed alphabetically, not ranked – Dylan Marchetti (Screen Slate)
- Listed alphabetically, not ranked – Collin Souter (RogerEbert.com)
- Listed alphabetically, not ranked – Kelli Weston (Screen Slate)
- Listed alphabetically, not ranked – Esther Zuckerman (Screen Slate)

=== Accolades ===
Award	Date of ceremony	Category	Recipient(s)	Result	Ref.
Alliance of Women Film Journalists EDA Award	31 December 2025	Female Focus: Best Female Director	Mona Fastvold	Nominated	
Astra Film Awards	9 January 2026	Best Actress in a Motion Picture — Comedy or Musical	Amanda Seyfried	Won	
Astra Film Awards	9 January 2026	Impact Award (Presented by Pecto Love)	Amanda Seyfried	Honored	
Astra Film Awards	9 January 2026	Best Original Song	"Clothed by the Sun" (Music and Lyrics by Daniel Blumberg)	Nominated	
Astra Film Awards	11 December 2025	Best Costume Design	Małgorzata Karpiuk	Nominated	
Austin Film Critics Association	18 December 2025	Best Picture	The Testament of Ann Lee	7th place	
Austin Film Critics Association	18 December 2025	Best Actress	Amanda Seyfried	Nominated	
Austin Film Critics Association	18 December 2025	Best Original Score	Daniel Blumberg	Nominated	
BFI London Film Festival	19 October 2025	Best Film	The Testament of Ann Lee	Nominated	
Chicago Indie Critics Windie Award	15 January 2026	Best Actress	Amanda Seyfried	Nominated	
Chicago Indie Critics Windie Award	15 January 2026	Best Song	"Clothed by the Sun" (Music and Lyrics by Daniel Blumberg)	Nominated	
Columbus Film Critics Association	8 January 2026	Actor of the Year (Note: For an Exemplary Body of Work, also for The Housemaid)	Amanda Seyfried	Nominated	
Chicago Film Critics Association	11 December 2025	Best Actress	Amanda Seyfried	Nominated	
Chicago Film Critics Association	11 December 2025	Best Costume Design	Małgorzata Karpiuk	Nominated	
Chicago Film Critics Association	11 December 2025	Best Director	Mona Fastvold	Nominated	
Chicago Film Critics Association	11 December 2025	Best Original Score	Daniel Blumberg	Nominated	
Critics' Choice Awards	4 January 2026	Best Actress	Amanda Seyfried	Nominated	
Critics' Choice Awards	4 January 2026	Best Song	"Clothed by the Sun" (Music and Lyrics by Daniel Blumberg)	Nominated	
Denver Film Critics Society	24 January 2026	Best Actress	Amanda Seyfried	Nominated	
DiscussingFilm Global Critic Award	24 January 2026	Best Costume Design	Małgorzata Karpiuk	3rd place	
DiscussingFilm Global Critic Award	24 January 2026	Best Original Song	"Clothed by the Sun" (Music and Lyrics by Daniel Blumberg)	Nominated	
Dorian Awards	3 March 2026	Film Performance of the Year	Amanda Seyfried	Nominated	
Dorian Awards	3 March 2026	Film Music of the Year	Daniel Blumberg	Nominated	
Dorian Awards	3 March 2026	Unsung Film of the Year (Note: To an exceptional movie worthy of greater attention)	The Testament of Ann Lee	Nominated	
Film Independent Spirit Awards	15 February 2026	Best Editing	Sofía Subercasseaux	Won	
Golden Globe Awards	8 January 2026	Best Actress in a Motion Picture – Musical or Comedy	Amanda Seyfried	Nominated	
Gotham Film Awards	1 December 2025	Best Feature	The Testament of Ann Lee (Note: Brady Corbet, Mona Fastvold, Joshua Horsfield, Gregory Jankilevitsch, Mark Lampert, Lillian LaSalle, Andrew Morrison, Viktória Petrányi, and Klaudia Śmieja-Rostworowska.)	Nominated	
Gotham Film Awards	1 December 2025	Outstanding Lead Performance	Amanda Seyfried	Nominated	
Hawaii Film Critics Society	12 January 2026	Best Sound	Levente Udud, Steve Single, Andy Neil	Nominated	
Indiana Film Journalists Association	15 December 2025	Best Stunt / Movement Choreography	Celia Rowlson-Hall, choreographer	Nominated	
Indiana Film Journalists Association	15 December 2025	Best Original Vision	The Testament of Ann Lee	Runner-up	
IndieWire Critics Poll	15 December 2025	Best Performance	Amanda Seyfried	9th place	
IndieWire Honors	4 December 2025	Visionary Award	Mona Fastvold	Honored	
Las Vegas Film Critics Society	19 December 2025	Best Actress	Amanda Seyfried	Won	
Las Vegas Film Critics Society	19 December 2025	Best Song	"Clothed by the Sun" (Music and Lyrics by Daniel Blumberg)	Nominated	
Midnight Critics Circle	1 February 2026	Best Original Song	"Clothed by the Sun" (Music and Lyrics by Daniel Blumberg)	Runner-up	
Minnesota Film Critics Association	2 January 2026	Best Lead Actress	Amanda Seyfried	Nominated	
Music City Film Critics Association	12 January 2026	Best Picture	The Testament of Ann Lee	Nominated	
Music City Film Critics Association	12 January 2026	Best Actress	Amanda Seyfried	Nominated	
Music City Film Critics Association	12 January 2026	Best Music Film	Amanda Seyfried	Nominated	
Music City Film Critics Association	12 January 2026	Best Production Design	Samuel Bader, Lauren Doss	Nominated	
New York Film Critics Online	15 December 2025	Best Actress	Amanda Seyfried	Nominated	
New York Film Critics Online	15 December 2025	Best Cinematography	William Rexer	Nominated	
New York Film Critics Online	15 December 2025	Best Director	Mona Fastvold	Nominated	
New York Film Critics Online	15 December 2025	Best Ensemble	The Testament of Ann Lee	Nominated	
New York Film Critics Online	15 December 2025	Best Use of Music	Daniel Blumberg	Nominated	
North Dakota Film Society	12 January 2026	Best Costume Design	Małgorzata Karpiuk	Nominated	
North Dakota Film Society	12 January 2026	Best Original Song	"Clothed by the Sun" (Music and Lyrics by Daniel Blumberg)	Nominated	
Online Film Critics Society	26 January 2026	Best Actress	Amanda Seyfried	Nominated	
Online Film Critics Society	26 January 2026	Best Choreography (Dance & Stunt)	Celia Rowlson-Hall	Nominated	
Palm Springs International Film Festival	3 January 2026	Desert Palm Achievement Award, Actress	Amanda Seyfried	Honored	
Portland Critics Association	31 December 2025	Best Lead Performance	Amanda Seyfried	Nominated	
Portland Critics Association	31 December 2025	Best Costume Design	Małgorzata Karpiuk	Won	
Puerto Rico Critics Association	2 January 2026	Best Picture	The Testament of Ann Lee	Nominated	
Puerto Rico Critics Association	2 January 2026	Best Comedy/Musical	The Testament of Ann Lee	Nominated	
Puerto Rico Critics Association	2 January 2026	Best Actress	Amanda Seyfried	Won	
Puerto Rico Critics Association	2 January 2026	Best Director	Mona Fastvold	Nominated	
Puerto Rico Critics Association	2 January 2026	Best Original Score	Daniel Blumberg	Nominated	
Puerto Rico Critics Association	2 January 2026	Best Original Song	"Clothed by the Sun" (Music and Lyrics by Daniel Blumberg)	Nominated	
Puerto Rico Critics Association	2 January 2026	Best Costume Design	Małgorzata Karpiuk	Nominated	
Puerto Rico Critics Association	2 January 2026	Best Production Design	Samuel Bader, Lauren Doss	Nominated	
Puerto Rico Critics Association	2 January 2026	Best Hair and Makeup	Stephanie Pasicov	Nominated	
SCAD Savannah Film Festival	27 October 2025	Vanguard Award	Amanda Seyfried	Honored	
Seattle Film Critics Society	15 December 2025	Best Actress in a Leading Role	Amanda Seyfried	Nominated	
St. Louis Film Critics Association	14 December 2025	Best Actress	Amanda Seyfried	Nominated	
St. Louis Film Critics Association	14 December 2025	Best Costume Design	Małgorzata Karpiuk	Nominated	
St. Louis Film Critics Association	14 December 2025	Best Original Score	Daniel Blumberg	Runner-up	
Venice Film Festival	6 September 2025	Golden Lion	Mona Fastvold	Nominated	
Women Film Critics Circle	20 December 2025	Best Actress	Amanda Seyfried	Runner-up	
Women Film Critics Circle	20 December 2025	Best Equality of the Sexes	The Testament of Ann Lee	Runner-up	
Women Film Critics Circle	20 December 2025	Karen Morely Award (Note: For best exemplifying a woman’s place in history or society, and a courageous search for identity)	The Testament of Ann Lee	Runner-up	
