= Mary Partington (Shaker) =

American Quaker (c. 1755–1833)

- Born: c. 1755; Mereton, Cheshire, England
- Died: September 10, 1833 (aged 78); Watervliet, New York, U.S.

Religious life
- Religion: Christianity
- Denomination: Shaker

Mary Partington (c. 1755 – September 10, 1833) was leader in the United Society of Believers in Christ's Second Appearing, more commonly known as Shakers. She helped found a number of the Shaker communities in the Americas.

== Life ==
She was born in Meretown (likely Marton), Cheshire. Her father, John Partington, was an active Shaker and their home was used for Shaker meetings. At age 18, she was one of nine Shakers who travelled under the leadership of Ann Lee to the American colonies aboard the Mariah in 1774. With her and Ann was William Lee, Abraham Stanley, Nancy Lee, James Whittaker, John Hocknell, Richard Hocknell, and James Shepherd. They arrived to New York City on August 6, 1774 after three months of sailing. Her father joined her in America the next year. They stayed in New York for nearly five years. In 1779, Hocknell leased land at Niskayuna in the township of Watervliet, near Albany, and the group settled there and began their community.

During the Revolutionary War, Ann and most of the Shaker elders were arrested under suspicion of disloyalty to the American cause due to their pacifist beliefs and recent arrival from England. The military intended to expel them into British controlled territory, but this proved unfeasible and were imprisoned at Poughkeepsie. Partington was not herself arrested, but accompanied Ann to the prison and was allowed to bring in groceries to the prisoner. Their imprisonment became a cause celebre. Being jailed for religious beliefs by a colony fighting for its freedom caused much controversy. They were released on order of Governor George Clinton.

The fame brought by their imprisonment increased the visibility of the Shakers and they took the opportunity over the next years to recruit converts through a series of missionary trips through New England. Partington was one of the leaders of these expeditions. She travelled both with Ann and on her own missionary trips.

She was the last surviving of the original Shakers who had travelled with Ann and was a primary source for the Shaker community in relaying the teachings of Lee and the other founders of the community. During the 1820s the Shaker community was attacked by a series of former members, and Mary Partington's memories of Ann Lee and the early days of the community were recorded in a defence for the community. In 1782, an angry mob closed in on the "Square House" at Harvard and threatened violence against the group. Lucy Wright held the crowd off and planned an escape alongside Partington. The two passed through the mob, under the guise of getting milk from the barn, and ran through the field.

Her father left the Shaker community in 1784 over disputes with James Whittaker, but Mary remain with the Shakers. The same year, Ann died at the age of 48. The group had three more leaders during Partington's lifetime - James Whittaker, Joseph Meacham, and Lucy Wright.

She died at the Shaker community of Watervliet, New York in 1833 at the age of 78.

== Cultural legacy ==
Partington was portrayed by Thomasin McKenzie in the 2025 film The Testament of Ann Lee, a musical drama focused on the beginnings of the Shakers and Lee's life. Her character serves as the films narrator.
