= Brodhead =

Brodhead may refer to:

== People ==
- Brodhead (surname)

== Places ==
- Brodhead, Colorado, a US ghost town
- Brodhead, Kentucky, a US city
- Brodhead, Wisconsin, a US city
- Brodhead Creek, a Pennsylvania stream
- A hamlet in the town of Olive, New York.

== See also ==
- Broadhead (disambiguation)
