= Broadhead (disambiguation) =

A broadhead is an arrowhead used for war and hunting.

Broadhead may also refer to:

- Broadhead (physiology), a person with a congenital disorder which has caused the head to become broadened
- Broadhead (surname), a surname

== See also ==
- Brodhead (disambiguation)
