= It Beats the Shakers =

Feminist anti-Shaker novel

It Beats the Shakers, or, A New Tune (1905) is a feminist, anti-Shaker satire by British novelist Anna D. Evans, based around a fictional community of Shakers.

In It Beats the Shakers, the birth of daughters is shown as bringing little joy; in response, supernatural powers are shown as only allowing men to be born on Earth. Once this all-male generation hits biological maturity, the same supernatural powers bring the men women from Venus to act as handmaids, wives and companions.

The men abuse their wives through neglect, adultery and exploitation. They are forced to do domestic labor, unpaid work in family businesses, and take the full financial burden for household care. In disgust, the women return to Venus with their daughters and leave the Earth a solely male planet. The novel then concluded apocalyptically with the Day of Judgement and the establishment of a New Jerusalem on Earth which is inclusive of women.

== Analysis ==
It Beats the Shakers criticizes the Shaker belief in celibacy and separate spheres for women, arguing that only through a radical change will men no longer treat their wives as their chattel. According to Nan Albinski, Evans' view is that while separate spheres may offer "a healthy alternative for women", "it is too limited to be fully effective. If adopted less than universally, men outside the communities will continue to preach self-sacrifice and subordination to the women around them". If adopted universally, it would bring about the end of humanity.

== Influences ==
Many contemporaries of Evans (such as Eva Wilder Brodhead in Diana's Livery, 1861) wrote critical novels on the nascent Shakers, focusing on the role of women in the movement, although Evans goes further than them in her criticism of the movement. Evans claims she was unaware of her contemporaries' interest in the movement.
