= Broadhead (surname) =

Broadhead is a surname. Notable people with the surname include:

- Caroline Broadhead (born 1950), English artist
- Dan Broadhead (1891–1978), Scottish footballer
- James Broadhead (1819–1898), American lawyer
- Nathan Broadhead (born 1998), Welsh footballer
- Theodore Henry Broadhead (1767–1820), British Member of Parliament
- Sir Theodore Brinckman, 1st Baronet (1798–1880), British Member of Parliament, born Theodore Henry Lavington Broadhead, son of Theodore Henry Broadhead
- Wilfred Broadhead (20th century), British cricketer
- William Broadhead (1815–1879), British trade unionist
- William Henry Broadhead (1848–1931), British theatre developer

== See also ==
- Brodhead (surname)
