= Brodhead (surname) =

Brodhead is a surname. Notable people with the surname include:

- Daniel Brodhead II (c.1700–1755), American judge and first European settler of Stroudsburg, Pennsylvania
- Daniel Brodhead (1736–1809), American military and political leader during the American Revolutionary War
- Eva Wilder Brodhead (1870–1915), American novelist and short story writer
- Jefferson Davis Brodhead (1859–1920), member of the U.S. House of Representatives from Pennsylvania
- John Curtis Brodhead (1780–1859), U.S. Representative from New York
- John Romeyn Brodhead (1814–1873), American historical scholar
- John Brodhead (New Hampshire) (1770–1838), U.S. Representative from New Hampshire.
- Richard Brodhead (1811–1863), American lawyer and politician
- Richard H. Brodhead (born 1947), president of Duke University
- William M. Brodhead (born 1941), politician from the U.S. state of Michigan

== See also ==
- Broadhead (surname)
