= Joseph Meacham =

Shakers leader and missionary

- Born: February 22, 1742; Enfield, Connecticut
- Died: August 16, 1796 (aged 54)
- Occupations: Shaker leader and missionary

Religious life
- Religion: Christianity
- Denomination: Shakers

Joseph Meacham (February 2, 1742 - August 16, 1796) was a Shaker leader and missionary. Having been one of the early American converts to Shakerism, he became the third leader of the Shakers after Ann Lee and James Whittaker.

== Biography ==
Born in Enfield, Connecticut, on February 2, 1742, Joseph Meacham was the son of Baptist minister Joseph Meacham and Sarah Wright Meacham. His grandfather was a Congregationalist minister. Meacham became a Baptist minister and led a congregation during the New Light Revival. After meeting with Ann Lee in 1780, only a few years after Ann Lee and her followers came to America, he and much of his congregation converted to Shakerism. In 1787, he succeeded James Whittaker as leader of the Shakers. After assuming leadership of the Shakers, Meacham initiated a number of projects including the establishment of New Lebanon as the administrative center of the Shakers, the construction of new buildings, and new rules and orders for Shaker communities. The changes in worship, social hierarchy, daily life, and community aesthetics instituted under the leadership of Meacham emphasized order and uniformity. He also initiated many of the communal aspects that would become defining features of Shaker society. He died on August 16, 1796. He was succeeded by Lucy Wright as leader of the Shakers.
