= Brodhead, Colorado =

Gghost town in Las Animas County, Colorado, United States

- ghost town
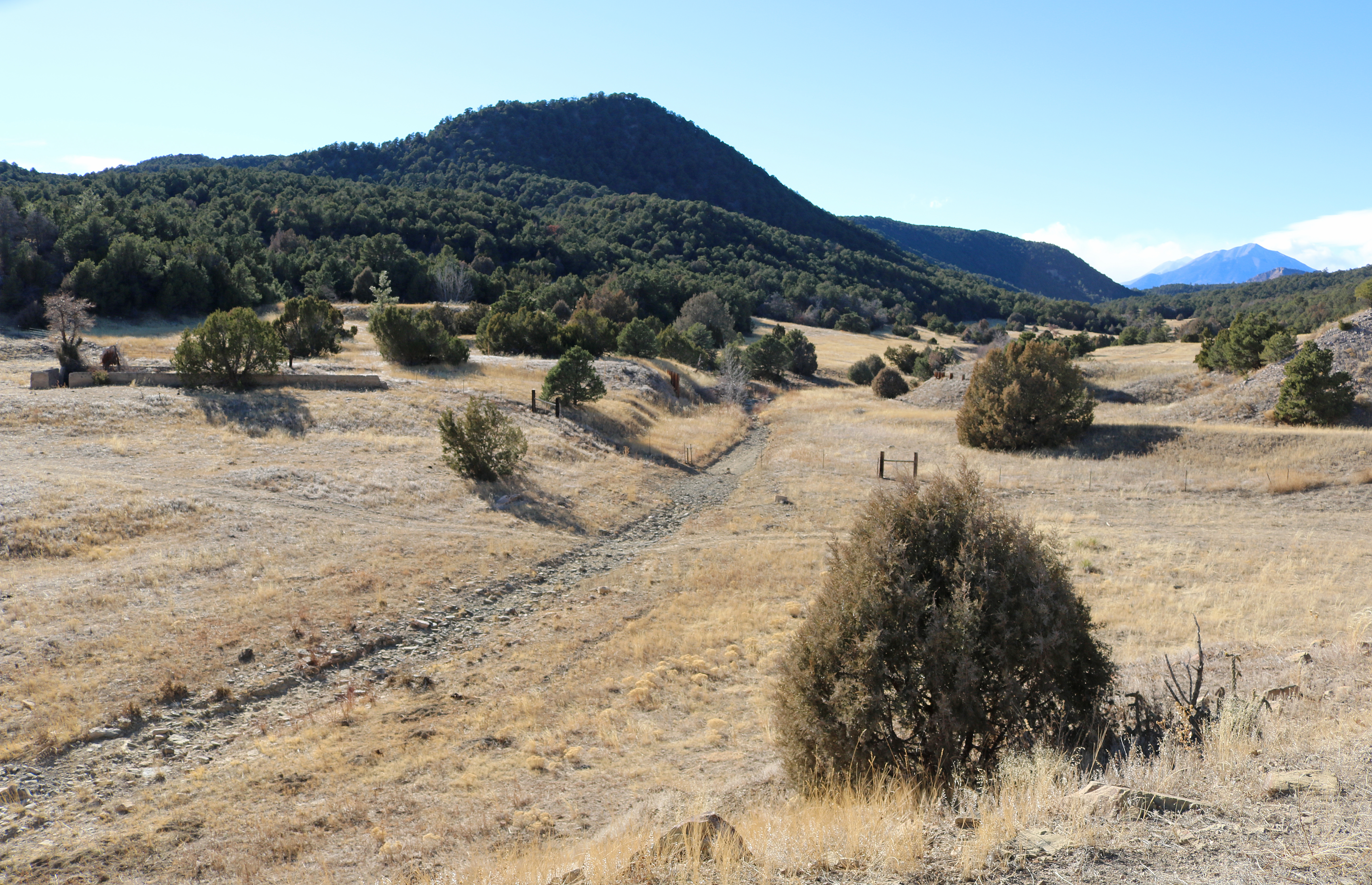
- The Brodhead town site in 2021

- Location of Brodhead, Colorado. Brodhead (Colorado)
- Coordinates: 37.4108°N 104.6764°W
- Country: United States
- State: Colorado
- County: Las Animas
- Elevation: 6,919 ft (2,109 m)
- Time zone: UTC−07:00 (MST)
  - Summer (DST): UTC−06:00 (MDT)

Brodhead is an extinct coal mining town located in Las Animas County, Colorado, United States. The townsite is located at coordinates 37.4108°N 104.6764°W at an elevation of 6,919 feet (2,109 m).

The town site is about 2.25 miles (3.6 km) north of Aguilar on the western side of Interstate 25 approximately 18 miles (29 km) north of the town of Trinidad. Nearby points of interest include the Ludlow Monument, a monument to the coal miners and their families who were killed in the 1914 Ludlow Massacre.

The population was a mix of Mexican and European immigrants. Some of the miners are known to have come from Stafford, England.

== History ==
Brodhead was a mining company town built and owned by a company formed by three brothers: Henry C. Brodhead (President) who was married to the author Eva Wilder Brodhead, Albert G. Brodhead (Vice President), and Robert S. Brodhead (Secretary and General Manager.) The Brodhead post office operated from August 14, 1902, until April 29, 1939. The mines operated between the late 1890s and the mid-1960s. The Brodhead brothers had previously operated a mine in Gonzales Canyon between 1896 and 1899.

=== 1911 ===
The 1911 Gazetter Publishing Company Business Directory listing for Brodhead, Las Animas Co. describes the town as:

Coal mining town in Las Animas county, 2 1/4 miles north of Aguilar, the railroad point. Stage to Aguilar and Lynn. Population 300.

And lists notable residents as:

Carl V. Bates, Physician
F Baudina, General Merchandise Store, G B Norman (Manager)
Howell & Bennett, Boarding House
Las Animas Coal Co, Win Burt (Superintendent)
E C Reck Jr., Postmaster (The Post Office had opened on Aug 14th 1902 and was closed on April 15th 1913)
J M Williams, Saloon

=== 1929 ===
The 1929 edition of the American Mining & Metallurgical Manual lists the Temple Fuel Company operating in the canyon as:

F.R. Wood, Trinidad, Colorado, President, General Manager.
Alexander Shields, Brodhead, Colorado, Superintendent.
Brodhead Colliery, (110,000 Tons) Slope. Steam Electric Plant.
7 Electrical Coal Cutters. Trolley Electric Locomotives, 200 Men.

A Post Office had also re-opened on July 19, 1915, only to close again on Apr 29th 1939

== Mining around Brodhead ==
There were a number of mines in the canyon:

| Mine Name (Also Known As) | Operator | Operating Dates |
|---|---|---|
| Brodhead #1 | Brodhead Coal Co | 1949-1951 |
| Brodhead #2 (Alfreda) | Vasquez and Vigil | 1947-1950 |
| | Brodhead Coal Co | 1950-1958 |
| Brodhead #3 (Las Animas) | Las Animas Coal Co | 1900-1911, 1917–1919 |
| Brodhead #4a | Brodhead Coal Co | 1958-1965 |
| Brodhead #9 (Temple #9) | Temple Fuel Co | 1911-1939 |
| Brodhead #10 (Alta) | Temple Fuel Co | 1911-1913, 1917–1919, 1920–1922 |
| Brodhead #11 (Alta) | Temple Fuel Co | 1911-1913, 1917–1919, 1920–1922 |

=== Deaths in the Mines ===
There are a number of deaths known at the mines, which, in common with all mining then and now was a dangerous occupation, including:

| Name | Date of death | Nationality | Occupation | Years of Mine Experience | Age at Death | Marital Status | Surviving Children | Company name | Mine Name | Cause of death/comments |
|---|---|---|---|---|---|---|---|---|---|---|
| Jacob GARCIA, | 19 Sep 1922 | Mexican | Machine Miner | 2 | 30 | Single | | Temple Fuel Co. | Brodhead No. 9 | Electrocuted |
| Roy GRAVIS | 31 Jan 1904 | American | Miner | | 20 | Single | | | Brodhead | Roof Fall |
| Thomas GREGORY | 13 Nov 1936 | American | Mine Foreman | 36 | 50 | Single | | Temple Fuel Co. | Brodhead No. 9 | Squeezed between the motor and the roof |
| Deno GUERRI | 4 Sep 1929 | Italian | Motorman | 4 | 21 | Single | | Temple Fuel Co. | Brodhead No. 9 | Electrocuted |
| Isidro TAFOYA | 10 Nov 1922 | American | Machine Miner | 5 | 34 | Married | 1 | Temple Fuel Co. | Brodhead No. 10 | Rock Fall |
| Cerillos TRUJILLO | 8 Feb 1928 | Mexican | Pick Miner | 5 | 34 | Married | 3 | Temple Fuel Co. | Brodhead No. 9 | Rock Fall |

== See also ==
- List of ghost towns in Colorado
- List of post offices in Colorado
