= The Shakertown Pledge =

Written oath against global wealth inequality

The Shakertown Pledge is a written oath created to draw attention to the inequality of worldwide wealth distribution. It was written on April 30, 1973, in a town near Lexington, Kentucky, which was historically connected to the Shaker Movement. The Pledge itself was a response to the inequality of distribution of global wealth and resources, and called for group action by Christians to rectify the problem.

The text of the oath is as follows:

Recognizing that Earth and the fullness thereof is a gift from our gracious God, and that we are called to cherish, nurture, and provide loving stewardship for Earth's resources, and recognizing that life itself is a gift, and a call to responsibility, joy, and celebration, I make the following declarations:

1. I declare myself a world citizen.
2. I commit myself to lead an ecologically sound life.
3. I commit myself to lead a life of creative simplicity and to share my personal wealth with the world's poor.
4. I commit myself to join with others in the reshaping of institutions in order to bring about a more just global society in which all people have full access to the needed resources for their physical, emotional, intellectual, and spiritual growth.
5. I commit myself to occupational accountability, and so doing I will seek to avoid the creation of products which cause harm to others.
6. I affirm the gift of my body and commit myself to its proper nourishment and physical wellbeing.
7. I commit myself to examine continually my relations with others and to attempt to relate honestly, morally, and lovingly to those around me.
8. I commit myself to personal renewal through prayer, meditation, and study.
9. I commit myself to responsible participation in a community of faith.

== See also ==
- Social justice
- Evangelical Left
