= Dan Broadhead =

Scottish footballer

Personal information
- Full name: Dan McKay Broadhead
- Date of birth: 16 November 1891
- Place of birth: Peebles, Scotland
- Date of death: 1978 (aged 86)
- Place of death: Milnathort, Scotland
- Position: Wing half

Senior career*
| Years | Team | Apps | (Gls) |
| 1912–1915 | Queen's Park | 9 | (0) |
| 1920–1921 | Battlefield Juniors | | |
- * Club domestic league appearances and goals

Dan McKay Broadhead (16 November 1891 – 1978) was a Scottish amateur footballer who played as a wing half in the Scottish League for Queen's Park.

== Personal life ==
As of 1911, Broadhead was a student teacher. He served as a private in the Highland Light Infantry during the First World War.

== Career statistics ==
Appearances and goals by club, season and competition
| Club | Season | League | | | Scottish Cup | | Total | |
| Club | Season | Division | Apps | Goals | Apps | Goals | Apps | Goals |
|---|---|---|---|---|---|---|---|---|
| Queen's Park | 1912–13 | Scottish First Division | 1 | 0 | 0 | 0 | 1 | 0 |
| Queen's Park | 1914–15 | Scottish First Division | 8 | 0 | — | | 8 | 0 |
| Career total | | | 9 | 0 | 0 | 0 | 9 | 0 |
