= Wilfred Broadhead =

English cricketer

Wilfred Bedford Broadhead (31 May 1903 – 2 April 1986) was an English first-class cricketer, who played one match for Yorkshire County Cricket Club in 1929.

Born in East Ardsley, Morley, Yorkshire, England, Broadhead was a right hand batsman who scored three runs, opening with Percy Holmes and two, batting at number 5, in his only innings for his native county against Kent in Tonbridge. Yorkshire lost the match by an innings. He was a right arm leg break bowler, but did not bowl in the game.

He played at least seven games for Yorkshire Second XI in the Minor Counties Championship in 1929 and 1930.

Broadhead died aged 82, in Wath-on-Dearne, in April 1986.
