= Ann Lee =

Founder of the Shakers (1736–1784)

Mother Ann Lee
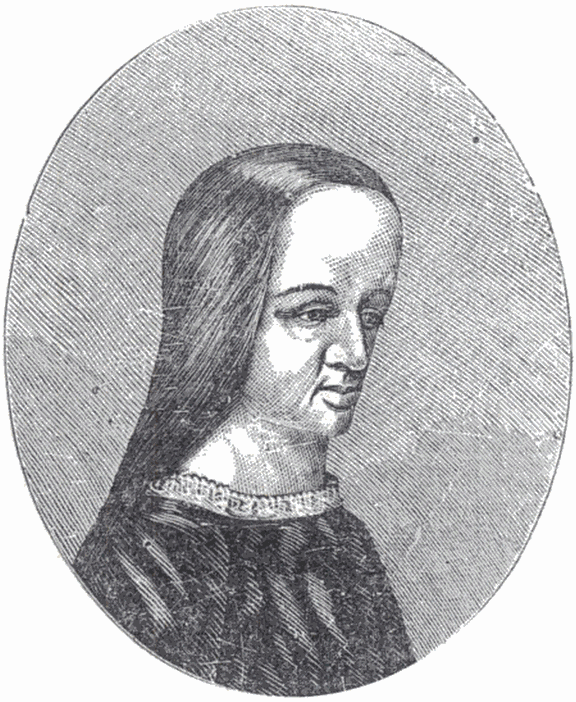
- Engraving c. 1871, believed by 19th-century Shakers to be a "psychometric" portrait of Ann Lee
- Born: Ann Lees; 29 February 1736; Manchester, England
- Died: 8 September 1784 (aged 48); Watervliet, New York, U.S.
- Burial place: Watervliet Shaker Village, Colonie, New York; 42.73909°N 73.81637°W
- Other names: Ann Elizabeth Lees; Ann Standerin
- Occupations: Founder of the Shakers; preacher; singer; missionary
- Years active: 1758–1784
- Spouse: Abraham Standerin (separated c. 1775)
- Children: 4 (all died in infancy)
- Parent(s): John Lees, Ann
- Relatives: William Lee (brother); Nancy Lee (niece)

Religious life
- Religion: Christianity
- Denomination: Shaker

Ann Lee (29 February 1736 – 8 September 1784), commonly known as Mother Ann Lee, was the founding leader of the Shakers, later changed to United Society of Believers in Christ's Second Appearing following her death. She was born during the Evangelical revival in England and greatly influenced religion of that time, especially in the Americas.

In 1774, after nearly two decades of participation in a religious movement that became the Shakers, Ann Lee and a small group of her followers emigrated from England to New York. After several years, they gathered at Niskayuna, renting land from the Manor of Rensselaerswyck, Albany County, New York (the area now called Colonie). They worshiped by ecstatic dancing or "shaking", which resulted in their being dubbed the Shakers. Ann Lee preached to the public and led the Shaker church at a time when few women were religious leaders. She was often referred to as, and considered by some Shakers, the female representation of God.

== Early history ==
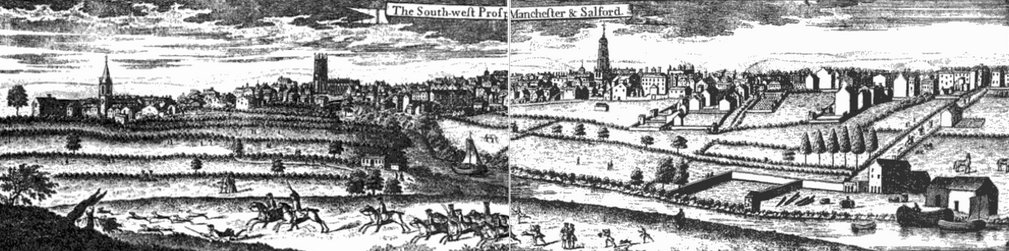
Manchester at Ann Lee's time (1746) panorama

Ann Lee was born in Manchester, England, the second child of eight born to her parents. She was baptized privately at Manchester Collegiate Church (now Manchester Cathedral) on 1 June 1742, at the age of 6. Her parents were members of a "distinct branch of the Society of Friends" and too poor to afford their children even the rudiments of education. It is sometimes claimed that Ann Lee or her parents were Quakers, but this has been disputed because scholars have been unable to find their names in relevant records. Ann Lee received no formal education, and remained illiterate throughout her life. Ann Lee's father, John Lees, was a blacksmith during the day and a tailor at night.

It is probable that Ann Lee's original surname was Lees but was changed at some point to Lee. Little is known about her mother other than that she was very religious and pious. As often happened in those days, her mother's name was not even recorded. When Ann was young, she worked in a cotton mill, then as a cutter of hatter's fur. At the age of 20 she worked in a much less dangerous occupation, as a cook in a Manchester infirmary, which was also the local insane asylum.

In 1758, she joined an English sect founded in 1747 by Jane Wardley and her husband, preacher James Wardley, which was the precursor to the Shaker sect. That sect was commonly known as the Shaking Quakers due to their similarities to the Quaker faith, but also their practice of cleansing from sin through chanting and dancing. Jane and James believed that the Second Coming was imminent and that God would return in the form of a woman. Ann Lee proclaimed herself to be that woman, and later received her title of "Mother" due to that belief. Ann believed, and taught her followers, that it was possible to attain perfect holiness by giving up sexual relations because she believed sexual relations to be the great sin of Adam and Eve. Like her predecessors, the Wardleys, she taught that the shaking and trembling was caused by sin being purged from the body by the power of the Holy Spirit, purifying the worshiper.

Beginning during her youth, Ann Lee was uncomfortable with sexuality, especially her own. That was partly due to her experience living and working in the city, seeing the sin around her. Her repulsion towards sexual activity continued and manifested itself in her repeated attempts to avoid marriage. Eventually, her father forced her to marry Abraham Stanley (or Abraham Standarin). They were married on 5 January 1761 at Manchester Collegiate Church. She became pregnant four times, but all of her children died during infancy. Her difficult pregnancies and the loss of four children were traumatic experiences that contributed to Lee's dislike of sexual relations.

Those losses also led her to truly question and solidify her beliefs. Lee developed radical religious convictions that advocated celibacy and the abandonment of marriage, as well as the importance of pursuing perfection in every facet of life. She differed from the Quakers, who, though they supported gender equality, did not believe in forbidding sexuality within marriage. The shaking Quakers also believed in an inner light and personal revelation, which was in common with the Quakers.

== Rise to prominence ==
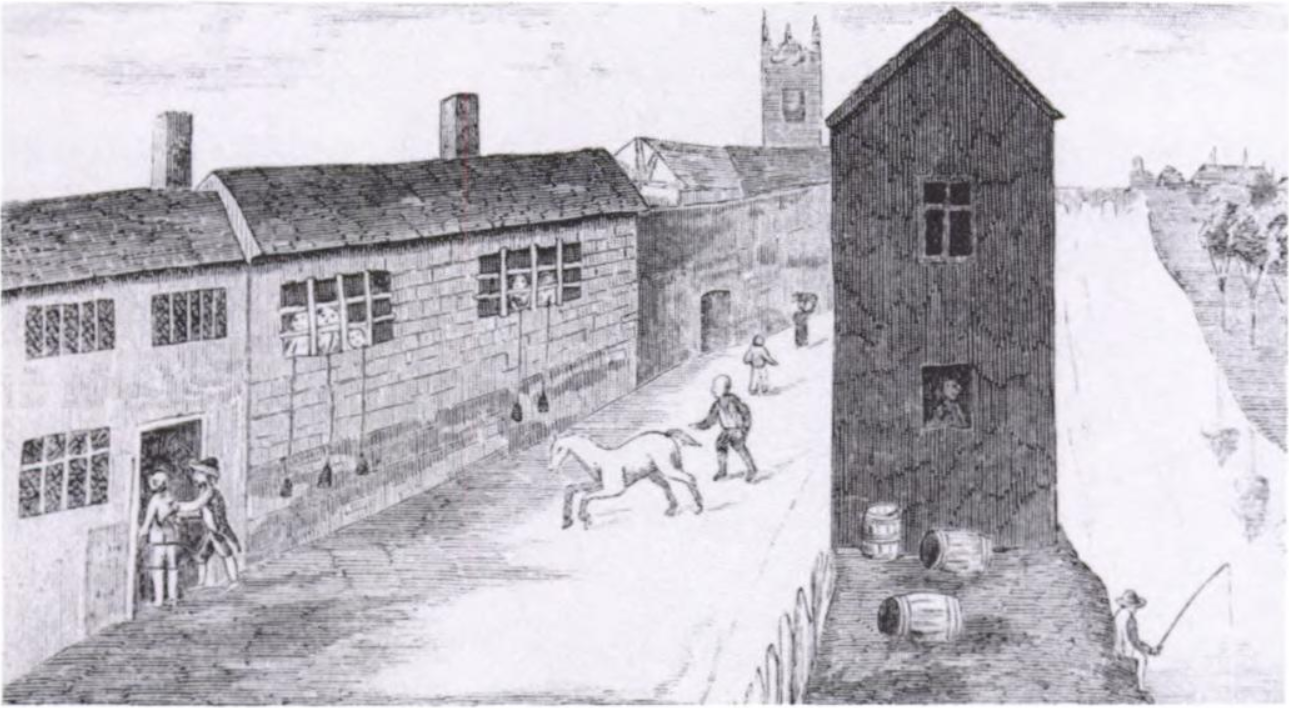
The House of Correction. Hunts' Bank, Manchester

In England, Ann Lee rose to prominence by urging other believers to preach more publicly concerning the imminent second coming, and to attack sin more boldly and unconventionally. She spoke of visions and messages from God, claiming that she had received in a vision from God the message that celibacy and confession of sin are the only true road to salvation and the only way in which the Kingdom of God could be established on the earth. She was frequently imprisoned for breaking the Sabbath by dancing and shouting, and for blasphemy.

Lee told of being examined by Manchester magistrates or "religious scholars" and said that she had spoken to them in 72 different tongues.

While in prison in Manchester for 14 days, she said she had a revelation that "a complete cross against the lusts of generation, added to a full and explicit confession, before witnesses, of all the sins committed under its influence, was the only possible remedy and means of salvation." She claimed to have seen a vision of Adam and Eve which told her that sexual relations were the root of all evil, and that she would be the second appearance of Christ. After this, probably in 1770, she was chosen by the Society as "Mother in spiritual things" and called herself "Mother Ann" and also "Ann, the Word", as in "the Word of God". After being released from prison a second time, witnesses say Mother Ann performed a number of miracles, including healing the sick.

Lee eventually decided to leave England for America in order to escape the persecution (i.e., multiple arrests and stays in prison) she experienced in Great Britain. She also saw the religious Awakening in the Americas and felt called to share her beliefs and religion.

== Move to America ==
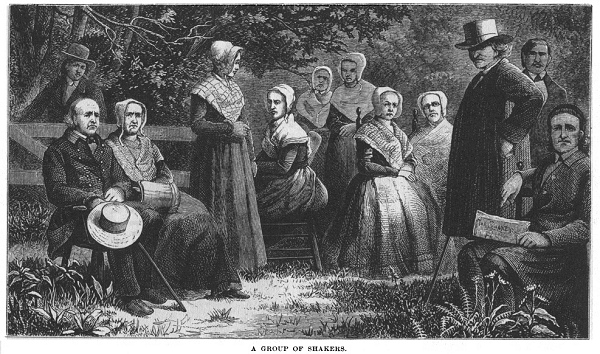
A group of Shakers, published in 1875

In 1774, a revelation led her to take a select band to America. She was accompanied by her husband, Abraham Stanley. Also following her to America were her brother, William Lee (1740–1784); Nancy Lee, her niece; James Whittaker (1751–1787), who had been brought up by Mother Ann and was probably related to her; John Hocknell (1723–1799), who provided the funds for the trip; his son, Richard; James Shepherd; and Mary Partington. These nine members sailed aboard the Mariah, landing in New York City. Mother Ann and her converts arrived on 6 August 1774 after three months of sailing.

During their first year, Lee lived with her husband with the Cunningham family of Queen Street. Lee worked as a laundry assistant while Stanley worked as a blacksmith. Stanley began to grow frustrated with Lee's insistence on celibacy and threatened to have sexual relations with a prostitute if Lee did not relent to his pleas. Lee remained faithful to her beliefs and Stanley left soon after - not much is known about his life after.

The group stayed in the area for nearly five years. In 1779, Hocknell leased land at Niskayuna in the township of Watervliet, near Albany. The Shakers settled there, and a unique community life began to develop and thrive.

During the American Revolution, Lee and her followers maintained a stance of neutrality. Maintaining the position that they were pacifists, Ann Lee and her followers did not side with either the British or the colonists. This caused contention towards the Shakers due to their refusal to sign an oath of allegiance.

Ann Lee opened her testimony to the world's people on the famous Dark Day in May 1780, when the sun disappeared and it was so dark that candles had to be lit to see indoors at noon. She soon recruited a number of followers who had joined the New Light revival at New Lebanon, New York, in 1779, including Lucy Wright.

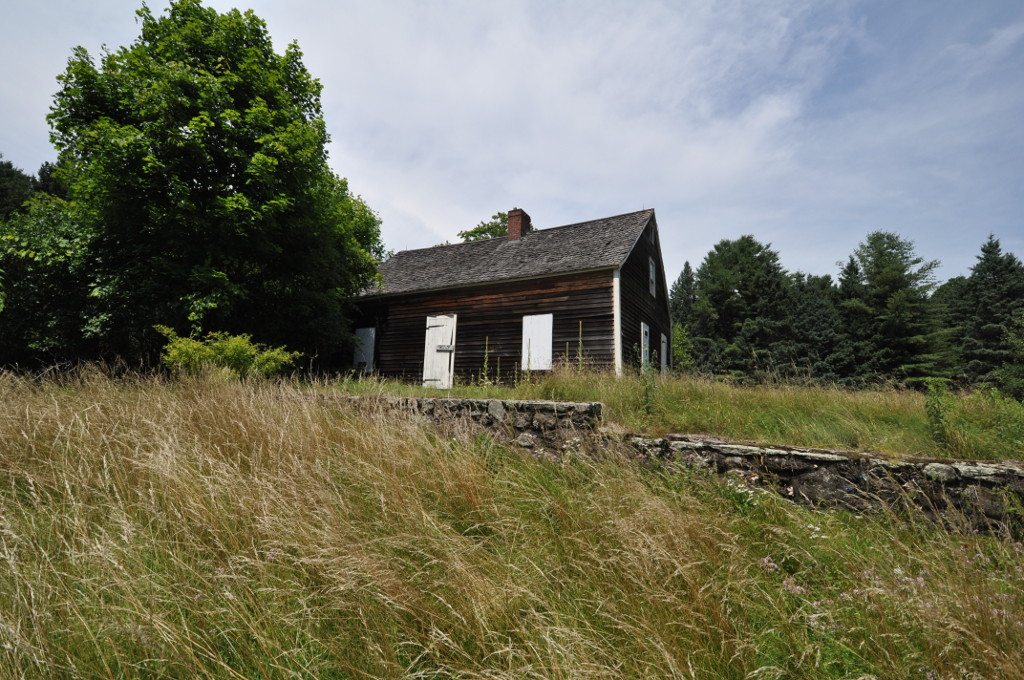
Benjamin Osborn's house at Mount Washington

Beginning in the spring of 1781, Mother Ann and some of her followers went on an extensive missionary journey to find converts in Massachusetts and Connecticut. They often stayed in the homes of local sympathizers, such as the Benjamin Osborn House near the New York–Massachusetts line. There were also songs attributed to her which were sung without words. In this mission they converted many, and 18 Shaker villages emerged. Witnesses recorded that she performed many miracles during this time.

Ann Lee's mission throughout New England was especially successful in converting groups who were already outside the mainstream of New England Protestantism, including followers of Shadrack Ireland. To the mainstream, however, she was too radical for comfort. Ann Lee herself recognized how revolutionary her ideas were when she said, "We [the Shakers] are the people who turned the world upside down."

The Shakers were sometimes met by violent mobs, such as in Shirley, Massachusetts, and Ann Lee suffered violence at their hands more than once. The mission came to an end when Ann and her brother William were again attacked by a mob, and badly injured. They returned home greatly weakened. William died over a year later on July 21, 1784. Ann died only a few months later on September 8, 1784 at the age of 48, likely hastened by the events she had undergone including the loss of her brother. She died at Watervliet and both William and Ann are buried in the Shaker cemetery located in the Watervliet Shaker Historic District. It was recorded that in her final days, Ann was "singing in unknown tongues" while sitting in her rocking chair.

The followers of Mother Ann came to believe that she embodied all the perfections of God in female form and was revealed as the "second coming" of Christ. The fact that Ann Lee was considered to be Christ's female counterpart was at the time unique, although several women since then have claimed to be Jesus, and have been accepted as such by their followers.

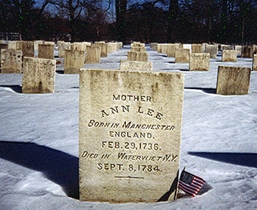
Mother Ann Lee's tombstone

It is claimed that Shakers in New Lebanon, New York, experienced a 10-year period of revelations in 1837 called the Era of Manifestations. It was also referred to as Mother Ann's Work. However, the Shakers' numbers dwindled with time, and soon the religion gradually all but disappeared. In total 19 official communities were established in the Northeast additional added in Florida with roughly 6,000 members prior to the Civil War.

== Shaker beliefs ==
Shaker beliefs were aligned heavily with those of the Quakers, such as gender equality, community and pacifism; however, the Shakers differed from the Quakers in their belief in celibacy.

Lee believed that celibacy was preferable to marriage, and within marriage, sex was only appropriate for the procreation of children. After her marriage and the death of four infant children, Lee thought that God was punishing her for engaging in sexual relations with her husband.

The Shakers were focused on creating a utopian community where everything was shared and everyone supported. They gathered in villages and lived in dormitory-style homes, encouraging celibacy. Due to the lack of sexual relations, the Shakers adopted children, and when they reached the age of 21 allowed them to choose to stay in the faith or leave to explore other things, giving the religion a way to continue through generations. They also worked hard to find converts.

== Shaker inventions ==
The Shakers were known for their industry and their inventions, including the clothespin, screw propeller, perfecting Babbitt metal, the automatic spring and turbine waterwheel. The Shakers were the first to sell seeds in envelope packages.

Shaker furniture is still popular today for its functionality and long-lasting construction.

== Cultural legacy ==
Ann Lee is memorialized in:

- The (afterword of the) 1985 novel A Maggot by John Fowles
- A song, "The Heart Of Ann Lee", on the 2010 album All This Longing by English folk singer-songwriter Reg Meuross
- The Testament of Ann Lee, a biographical musical film starring Amanda Seyfried as Ann Lee and directed by Mona Fastvold, premiered at the 82nd Venice International Film Festival on 1 September 2025. It received favorable reviews.

== See also ==
- List of people who have claimed to be Jesus
- Messiah complex – Belief that one is a messiah or prophet
- Millennial Praises – Early collection of Shaker hymns
- The Public Universal Friend, contemporary leader of another new religious movement
