= List of Shaker inventions =

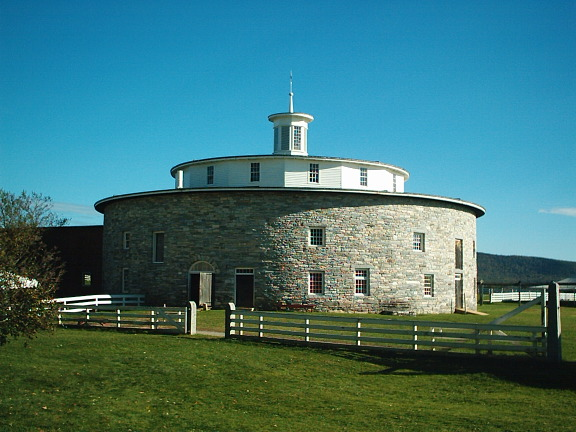
Round barn, Hancock Shaker Village

This article contains a list of inventions by the Shakers, officially known as the United Society of Believers in Christ's Second Appearance. Founded in the 18th century, the Shakers, a celibate sect who lived a communal lifestyle, were known for their many innovative creations in varied fields including agriculture, furniture, housework, and medicine.

== Architecture ==
- Adjustable ventilating door transoms
- Round barn
- Sash-balance counterweight
- Shaker stairs

== Food and agriculture ==
- Apple parer and corer
- Automatic seed planter
- Condensed milk
- Fertilizer spreader
- Pea sheller
- Rotary harrow
- Shaker Lemon Pie
- Threshing machine

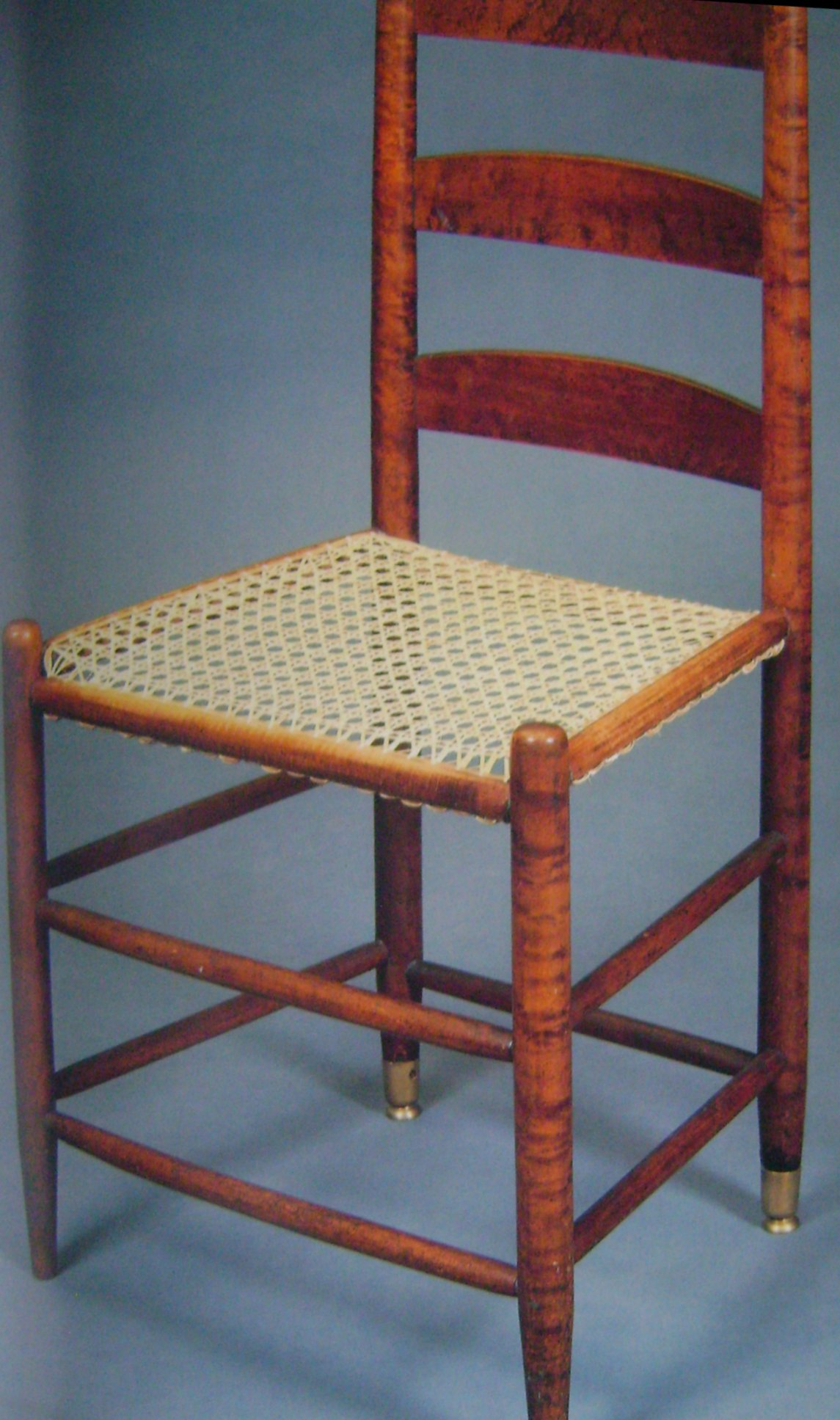
Shaker tilting chair

== Furniture ==
- Shaker pantry box
- Shaker tilting chair

== Medicine and healthcare ==
- Corbett's electrostatic machine
- Syrup of Sarsaparilla

== Tools and appliances ==
- Peg-boards (often called "clothes-pins")
