= Jane Wardley =

Wardley, Jane (fl. 1747–1770), a founder of the Shakers

Mother Jane Wardley
- Successor: Ann Lee

Personal details
- Born: Jane Wardley
- Died: Manchester, England
- Denomination: originally Religious Society of Friends (Quakers), and later Shakers
- Residence: Bolton, Lancashire, England
- Spouse: James Wardley

Jane Wardley, also known as Mother Jane Wardley, was a founding leader of what became the United Society of Believers in Christ's Second Appearing, more commonly known as Shakers.

== Personal life ==
Little is known about Wardley's personal life. She was a resident of Bolton, located in the United Kingdom, also known as Bolton-le-moors. She lived and worked there with her husband James, who worked as a tailor. They later moved to Manchester where they continued to live in low temporal conditions.

== Religious life ==
Wardley and her husband were devout members of the Society of Friends, also known as Quakers. However, around 1747 Wardley began to have visions from God telling her to go about her town teaching the truth about the end of the world: that Christ was about to return, and that his second appearance would be in the form of a woman, as is written in the book of Psalms in the Bible. Inspired, she did just that. Her first convert was her husband, soon followed by John Townley, who was considered a relatively wealthy bricklayer (he later provided significant funding for the Wardley Group), and former Anglicans and Methodists. As a Quaker her worship often began with a period of silent meditation. However, she often began shaking, and rocking, as she "received visions from god". This led to her followers being called "Shaking Quakers".

"In their worship they would sit in silent meditation for a while, when they were taken with a mighty trembling under which they would express the indignation of God against all sin. At other times they were affected, under the power of God, with a mighty shaking; and were occasionally exercised in singing, shouting, or walking the floor under the influence of spiritual signs, or swiftly passing and repassing each other, like clouds agitated by a mighty wind." The Testimony of Christ's Second Appearing. (1810)

== Wardley Society ==
The Wardley Society, also known as the Wardley Group and the Bolton Society, was a Quaker worship group founded in Bolton by Jane and James Wardley. The religious practices of the group can be traced back to French prophets called "Camisards" who travelled to England in 1705 to preach and spread their method of worship. These teachings spread rapidly through England and influenced the Wardleys, who began their own preaching and teaching at their home to about 30 devout followers. As described in the previous section, they began their worship like many other Quaker groups but they soon began to shake, rock, and occasionally break into singing and dancing.

Meetings were first held in Bolton, and later Manchester, where the articulate preacher, Jane Wardley, urged her followers to:

"Repent. For the kingdom of God is at hand. The new heaven and new earth prophesied of old is about to come. The marriage of the Lamb, the first resurrection, the new Jerusalem descended from above, these are even now at the door. And when Christ appears again, and the true church rises in full and transcendent glory, then all anti-Christian denominations—the priests, the Church, the pope—will be swept away."

They preached that people should open their hearts and prepare for the second coming of Jesus Christ, who would be reincarnated in the near future as a woman.

John Townley began to visit the meetings in Manchester after he left the Church of England, then joined the Methodist Society. He was a relatively wealthy bricklayer. Around 1766, he was visited at his home by James Wardley. He subsequently joined the Wardley Group and hosted many poorer members of the society.

== Influence on Ann Lee ==
Ann Lee was the daughter of two devout members of the church. She was compelled by the power of the testimonies of Wardley and her husband, and confessed her sins to them. She taught that repentance was essential to the reception of the power to forsake sin. She became the first leader of the Shakers.
