= Lucy Wright =

Final Solo-Leader of the Shakers from 1796 to 1821

Lucy Wright (February 5, 1760 – February 7, 1821) was the leader of the United Society of Believers in Christ’s Second Appearing, also known as the Shakers, from 1796 until 1821. At that time, a woman's leadership of a religious sect was a radical departure from Protestant Christianity.

== Childhood ==
Lucy Wright was born February 5, 1760, the daughter of John and Mary (Robbins) Wright [sic, of Josiah and Elizabeth (Robbins) Wright] of Pontoosuck plantation (later Pittsfield, Massachusetts), in the Housatonic River valley of the Berkshire hills near the New York border. At that time, Pontoosuck plantation was a frontier settlement, which was reached via path-like roads. Aside from Jonathan Edwards’ Indian mission in Stockbridge, the area had no church until Wright was almost thirteen.

Wright was considered an attractive woman and a leader. With Elizur Goodrich, she attended the New Light Baptist revival at New Lebanon, New York in 1779. Near the end of the revival, they heard a preacher expound on Romans 8:8 (“Those who are in the flesh cannot please God”), which may have set the stage for their conversion to a new religion.

== Marriage ==
Lucy Wright married Elizur Goodrich on December 15, 1779. By mid-1780, Elizur Goodrich was drawn to the preachings of the Shaker leader, Mother Ann Lee, despite the new religion's requirements of celibacy and confession of sins. His bride, however, was reluctant to convert. Thus Elizur Goodrich and his wife Lucy lived “uncommonly continent”.

Goodrich and twenty members of his extended family joined the Shakers. After several months of deliberation, Wright resumed her maiden name and replaced her marriage with a commitment to Shakerism, living apart from her husband, who became an itinerant Shaker preacher. Within a decade Wright rose to leadership within the Shaker sect, with the power and authority which women were not allowed in other religions.

== Life as a Shaker ==
As soon as Wright shifted her commitment from her husband to her new religion, Mother Ann Lee found it expedient to separate the young couple. She sent Goodrich on the road as an itinerant preacher and missionary. Wright moved to the Shaker community at Watervliet, New York, where Ann Lee mentored the young woman and she became a leader among her peers.

Ann Lee died in 1784. By late 1788, the society’s new leader Joseph Meacham had had a revelation that Shakers should practice equality of the sexes, or gender equality. He summoned Wright to New Lebanon, New York, and named her his female counterpart in leadership. Together, Meacham and Wright reshaped their religious society to include gender-balanced government, and gathering Believers into communal villages.

Lucy Wright worked with Joseph Meacham until he died in 1796. After his death, Wright was the acknowledged leader of the Shaker ministry (a team of two elders and two eldresses who governed the society).

Wright proved to be a good administrator. She survived the exit of disaffected young men in the 1790s and sustained “petticoat government” for 25 years. Her long tenure as the Ministry’s leader meant that she had ample opportunity to establish the principles of gender equality, and her leadership set an example for equality of the sexes.

Wright sent missionaries to preach across New England and upstate New York. After hearing of revivals at Cane Ridge, Kentucky during the Second Great Awakening, she sent missionaries into the western wilderness, where they recruited proselytes and established new Shaker villages in Kentucky, Ohio, and Indiana.

Under Wright's administration, Shakers standardized and increased book and tract publishing for the widely-scattered religious society. Their first statement of beliefs was Testimony of Christ’s Second Appearing in 1810, followed by a hymnal, Millennial Praises, which served much the same purpose in 1813.

Lucy Wright preached union among her followers. One of her sayings was, "There is a daily duty to do; that is, for the Brethren to be kind to the Brethren, Sisters kind to the Sisters, and the Brethren and Sisters kind to each other."

She died on February 7, 1821. Her grave is beside that of Mother Ann Lee, in the Shaker cemetery in the Watervliet Shaker Historic District, now the town of Colonie, New York.

After Lucy Wright's death, some Shakers evidently questioned Shaker sisters' equality to Shaker brethren; they must have thought that Wright alone had maintained equality of the sexes. Nevertheless, her successors made sure that equal rights did not end with her demise. A New Lebanon Elder said, “Mother Lucy’s work was to establish and support an equ[ality] in the Church between brethren and sisters,” and he expected the believers to support it. He assured the sisters “that they have the same right as ever they had when Mother was with us, the[y] must not be deprived of their lo[t] & equality in the gospel .... It is in the perfect union between the two that we shall find our relation in the kingdom.”
