= Eva Wilder Brodhead =

19th century American novelist

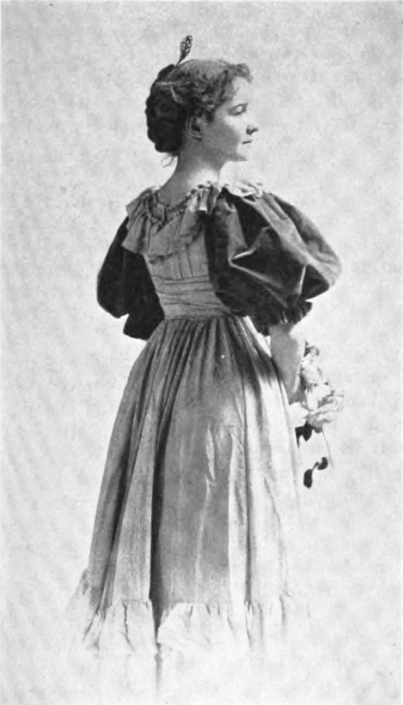
Eva Wilder Brodhead

Eva Wilder McGlasson Brodhead (1870–1915) was a nineteenth-century American novelist, author and contributor to Harper's Magazine. She is best known for her 1891 book Diana's Livery, which is set in a hypothetical Shaker community and discusses themes of utopianism, gender separation and all-woman spheres.

== Bibliography ==
- Diana's Livery (1891)
- An Earthly Paragon (1892)
- Ministers of Grace (1894)
- One of the Visconti (1896)
- Bound in Shallows (1897)
- A Prairie Infanta (1904)
