= James Whittaker (Shaker) =

2nd Leader of the Shakers from 1784 to 1787

James Whittaker (February 28, 1751 – July 20, 1787) was the second leader of the Shakers.

Whittaker was born in Oldham, England and became a weaver and a member of the artisan and merchant class. He came to colonial America with Mother Ann Lee, who was one of his relatives and raised him. Father James Whittaker, Father William Lee (Ann's brother), and Mother Ann Lee had lived in Manchester, England and were known as the First Parents of the Shaker sect. Whittaker was a powerful orator who drew many people to the Shaker sect.

He became leader following the death of Mother Ann Lee in September 1784. Under Whittaker's lead, Shaker communities were formed in New England and the meetinghouse was built at Mount Lebanon in 1785. Mount Lebanon would go on to become the center for all other Shaker communities, from Maine to Kentucky.

Whittaker had suffered from physical abuse and traveled a great deal for the sect. Having a premonition of his death, he chose to die at Enfield, Connecticut Shaker community. After James Whittaker's death in 1787, the American Joseph Meacham, with whom he had a power struggle, became the next leader of the Shakers.
