= Shakers =

Christian monastic denomination

United Society of Believers in Christ's Second Appearing
- A group of Shakers, pictured in 1880
- Classification: Restorationist
- Orientation: Shaker
- Region: Maine, United States
- Language: English
- Founder: Ann Lee
- Origin: 1747; 279 years ago, England
- Separated from: Religious Society of Friends
- Members: 2 (2026)
- Official website: maineshakers.com

The United Society of Believers in Christ's Second Appearing, more commonly known as the Shakers, are a millenarian restorationist Christian sect founded c. 1747 in England and then organized in the United States in the 1780s. They were initially known as "Shaking Quakers" because of their ecstatic behavior during worship services.

Espousing egalitarian ideals, the Shakers practice a celibate and communal utopian lifestyle, pacifism, uniform charismatic worship, and their model of equality of the sexes, which they institutionalized in their society in the 1780s. They are known for their simple living, architecture, technological innovation, music, and furniture. Women took on spiritual leadership roles alongside men, including founding leaders such as Jane Wardley, Ann Lee, and Lucy Wright. The Shakers emigrated from England and settled in British North America, with an initial settlement at Watervliet, New York (present-day Colonie) in 1774.

During the mid-19th century, an Era of Manifestations resulted in a period of dances, gift drawings, and gift songs inspired by spiritual revelations. At its peak in the mid-19th century, there were 2,000–4,000 Shaker believers living in 18 major communities and numerous smaller, often short-lived communities. External and internal societal changes in the mid- and late 19th century resulted in the thinning of the Shaker community as members left or died with few converts to the faith to replace them.

By 1920, there were only 12 Shaker communities remaining in the United States. Since 2019, there has only been one active Shaker village: Sabbathday Lake Shaker Village, in Maine. Consequently, many of the other Shaker settlements are now museums. As of November 3, 2026, there are two remaining members.

== History ==
=== Origins ===
The Shakers were one of a few religious groups which were formed during the 18th century in the northwest of England; originating out of the Wardley Society. James and Jane Wardley and others broke off from the Quakers in 1747 at a time when the Quakers were weaning themselves away from frenetic spiritual expression. The Wardleys formed the Wardley Society, which was also known as the "Shaking Quakers".

Ann Lee and her parents were early members of the sect. This group of "charismatic" Christians became the United Society of Believers in Christ's Second Appearing. Their beliefs were based upon spiritualism and included the notion that they received messages from the Holy Spirit which were expressed during religious revivals. They also experienced what they interpreted as messages from God during silent meditations and became known as "Shaking Quakers" because of the seizure-like convulsions they acted out in their worship services. They believed in the renunciation of sinful acts and that the end of the world was near.

Meetings were first held in Bolton, Lancashire, where the articulate preacher, Jane Wardley, urged her followers to:

Repent. For the kingdom of God is at hand. The new heaven and new earth prophesied of old is about to come. The marriage of the Lamb, the first resurrection, the new Jerusalem descended from above, these are even now at the door. And when Christ appears again, and the true church rises in full and transcendent glory, then all anti-Christian denominations—the priests, the Church, the pope—will be swept away.

Other meetings were then held in Manchester, Meretown (also spelled Mayortown), Chester and other places near Manchester. As their numbers grew, members began to be persecuted, mobbed, and stoned; Lee was imprisoned in Manchester. The members looked to women for leadership, believing that the second coming of Christ would be through a woman. In 1770, Ann Lee was revealed in "manifestation of Divine light" to be the second coming of Christ and was called Mother Ann.

=== Mother Ann Lee ===
Ann Lee joined the Shakers by 1758, then became the leader of the small community. "Mother Ann", as her followers later called her, claimed numerous revelations regarding the fall of Adam and Eve and its relationship to sexual intercourse. A powerful preacher, she called her followers to confess their sins, give up all their worldly goods, and take up the cross of celibacy and forsake marriage, as part of the renunciation of all "lustful gratifications".

She said:

I saw in vision the Lord Jesus in his kingdom and glory. He revealed to me the depth of man's loss, what it was, and the way of redemption therefrom. Then I was able to bear an open testimony against the sin that is the root of all evil; and I felt the power of God flow into my soul like a fountain of living water. From that day I have been able to take up a full cross against all the doleful works of the flesh.

Having supposedly received a revelation on May 19, 1774, Lee and eight of her followers sailed from Liverpool for colonial America. Ann and her husband Abraham Stanley, brother William Lee, niece Nancy Lee, James Whittaker, father and son John Hocknell and Richard Hocknell, James Shephard, and Mary Partington traveled to colonial America and landed in New York City. Stanley abandoned Lee shortly thereafter and remarried. The remaining Shakers settled in Watervliet, New York, in 1776. Lee's hope for the Shakers in America was represented in a vision: "I saw a large tree, every leaf of which shone with such brightness as made it appear like a burning torch, representing the Church of Christ, which will yet be established in this land." Unable to swear an oath of allegiance, as it was against their faith, the members were imprisoned for about six months. Since they were only imprisoned because of their faith, this raised sympathy of citizens and thus helped to spread their religious beliefs. Mother Ann, declaring herself as the "second coming" of Christ, traveled throughout the eastern states, preaching her gospel views.

=== Joseph Meacham and communalism ===
Historical marker at the Niskayuna Community Cemetery in modern-day Colonie, New York, where Mother Ann Lee is buried

After Lee and Whittaker died, Joseph Meacham became the leader of the Shakers in 1787, establishing its New Lebanon headquarters. He had been a New Light Baptist minister in Enfield, Connecticut, and was reputed to have the spiritual gift of revelation.

Meacham brought Lucy Wright into the ministry to serve with him, and together they developed the Shaker form of communal living (religious communism). By 1793 property had been made a "consecrated whole" in each Shaker community.

Shakers developed written covenants in the 1790s. Those who signed the covenant had to confess their sins, consecrate their property and their labor to the society, and live as celibates. If they were married before joining the society, their marriages ended when they joined. A few less-committed believers lived in "noncommunal orders" as Shaker sympathizers who preferred to remain with their families. The Shakers did not forbid marriage for such individuals but considered it less perfect than the celibate state.

Between 1787 and 1792, the Shakers gathered into eight more communities in addition to the Watervliet and New Lebanon villages: Hancock, Harvard, Shirley, and Tyringham Shaker Villages in Massachusetts; Enfield Shaker Village in Connecticut; Canterbury and Enfield in New Hampshire; and Sabbathday Lake and Alfred Shaker Village in Maine.

=== Lucy Wright and westward expansion ===
After Meacham died, Wright continued Lee's missionary tradition. Shaker missionaries proselytized at revivals in New England and New York and farther west. Missionaries such as Issachar Bates and Benjamin Seth Youngs (older brother of Isaac Newton Youngs) gathered hundreds of proselytes into the faith. Wright introduced new hymns and dances to make sermons more lively. She also helped write Benjamin Youngs' book The Testimony of Christ's Second Appearing (1808).

On April 12, 1805, Benjamin Youngs and two companions held the first ceremony west of the Allegheny Mountains. It was held at the cabin of James Beedle near Lebanon, Ohio. In 2019, the cabin was relocated by the Warren County Historical Society to its current site next to Harmon Museum in Lebanon, the 1795 Beedle Log Cabin.

Shaker missionaries entered Kentucky and Ohio after the Cane Ridge, Kentucky revival of 1801–1803, which was an outgrowth of the Logan County, Kentucky, Revival of 1800. From 1805 to 1807, they founded Shaker societies at Union Village, Ohio; South Union, Logan County, Kentucky; and Pleasant Hill, Kentucky (in Mercer County, Kentucky). In 1806, a Shaker village, named Watervliet after the New York town that was the site of the first Shaker settlement, was established in what is today Kettering, Ohio, surviving until 1900 when its remaining adherents joined the Union Village Shaker settlement. In 1824, the Whitewater Shaker Settlement was established in southwestern Ohio. The westernmost Shaker community was located at West Union (called Busro because it was on Busseron Creek) in Knox County, Indiana.

=== Era of Manifestations ===
The Shaker movement was at its height between 1820 and 1860. It was at this time that the sect had the most members, and the period was considered its "golden age". It had expanded from New England to Indiana, Ohio, and Kentucky. It was during this period that it became known for its furniture design and craftsmanship. In the late 1830s a spiritual revivalism, the Era of Manifestations was born. It was also known as the "period of Mother's work", for the spiritual revelations that were passed from the late Mother Ann.

The expression of "spirit gifts" or messages were realized in "gift drawings" made by Hannah Cohoon, Rebecca Landon, Polly Reed, Polly Collins, and other Shaker sisters. A number of those drawings remain as important artifacts of Shaker folk art.

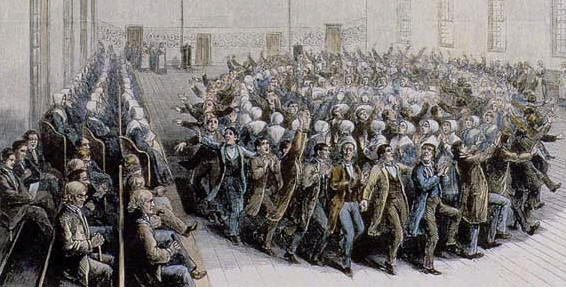
Shaker dance and worship, during the Era of Manifestations

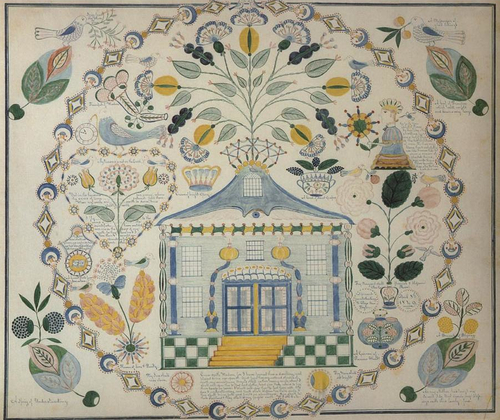
Polly Ann Reed, A present from Mother Lucy to Eliza Ann Taylor, 1851

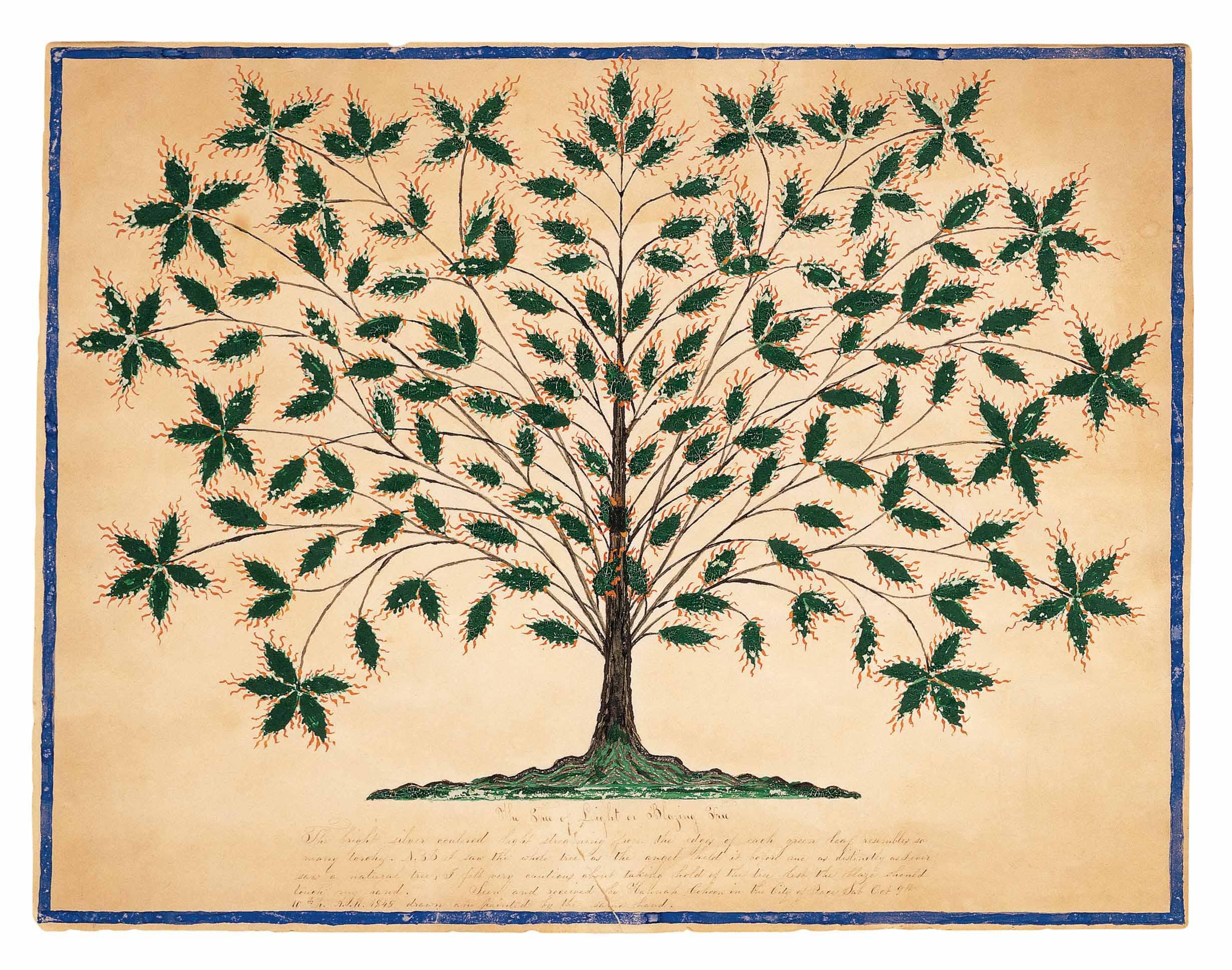
Hannah Cohoon, The Tree of Light or Blazing Tree, 1845

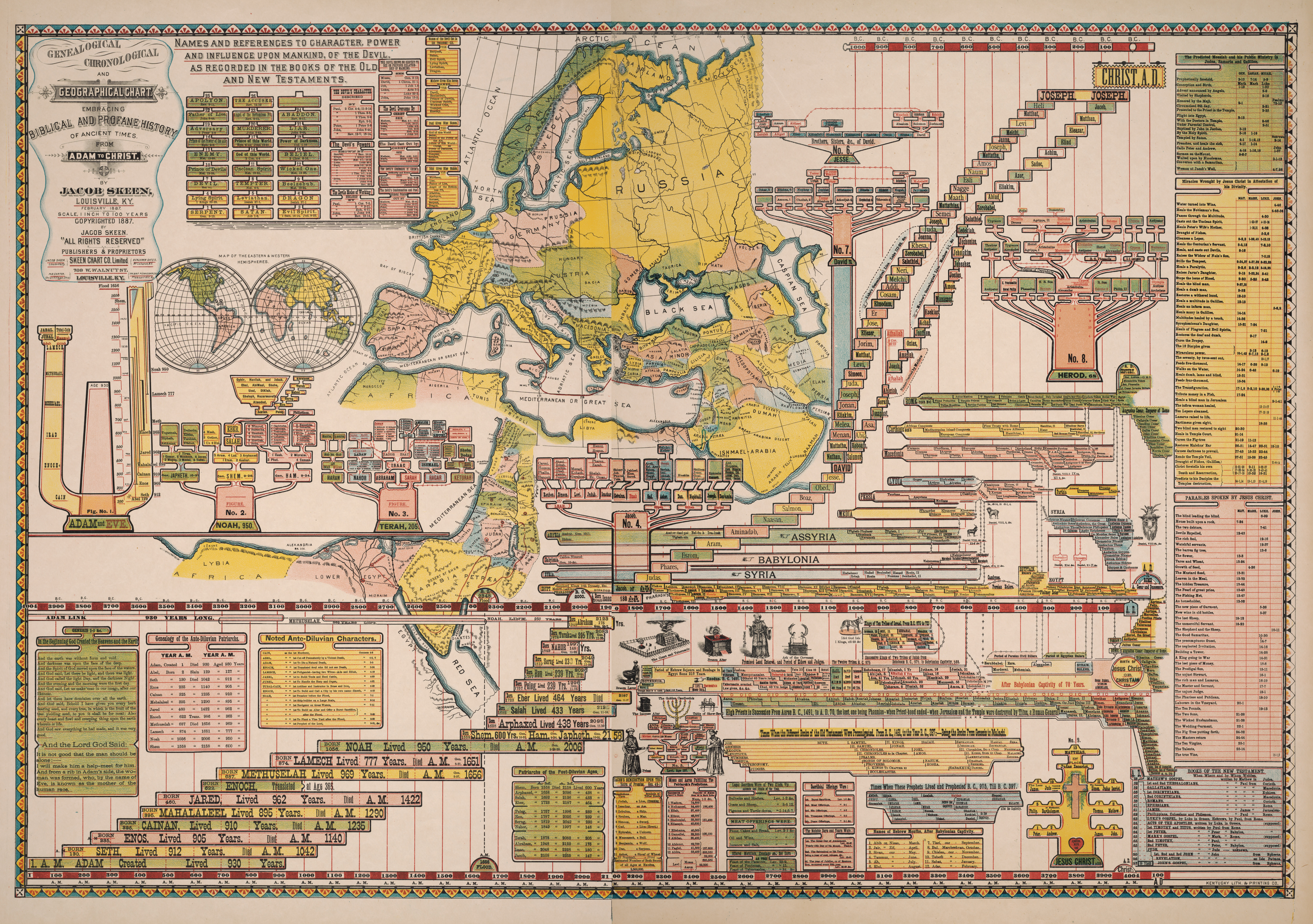
A two-sheet religious chart intended to further Shaker education, by Jacob Skeen, 1887

Isaac N. Youngs, the scribe and historian for the New Lebanon, New York, Church Family of Shakers, preserved a great deal of information on the era of manifestations, which Shakers referred to as Mother Ann's Work, in his Domestic Journal, his diary, Sketches of Visions, and his history, A Concise View of the Church of God.

In addition, Shakers preserved thousands of spirit communications extant in collections held by the Berkshire Athenaeum, Fruitlands Museums Library, Hamilton College Library, Hancock Shaker Village, Library of Congress, New York Public Library, New York State Library, the Shaker Library at Sabbathday Lake Shaker Village, Shaker Museum | Mount Lebanon, Western Reserve Historical Society, Williams College Archives, Winterthur Museum Library, and other repositories.

=== American Civil War period ===
As pacifists, (Note: Brethren, Mennonites and Quakers are the three "historic peace churches". Other religions were pacifists who eschewed violence and war, including the Shakers.) the Shakers did not believe that it was acceptable to kill or harm others, even in time of war. During the American Civil War, both Union and Confederate soldiers found their way to the Shaker communities. Shakers tended to sympathize with the Union, but they did feed and care for both Union and Confederate soldiers. President Lincoln exempted Shaker males from military service, and they became some of the first conscientious objectors in American history.

The end of the Civil War brought large changes to the Shaker communities. One of the most important changes was the postwar economy and its growing mechanization, which produced goods much cheaper than the Shakers' traditional methods.

=== 20th century to the present ===
By the early 20th century, the once numerous Shaker communities were failing and closing. Shaker artisans could not compete with modern factories, and so many chose to renounce their faith and leave so they could earn a living. By mid-century, new federal laws were passed denying control of adoption to religious groups, rendering it impossible for children to join the group. The last active Shaker community—the Sabbathday Lake Shaker Community—denies that Shakerism was a failed utopian experiment.

Their message, surviving over two centuries in the United States, reads in part as follows:

Shakerism is not, as many would claim, an anachronism; nor can it be dismissed as the final sad flowering of 19th century liberal utopian fervor. Shakerism has a message for this present age–a message as valid today as when it was first expressed. It teaches above all else that God is Love and that our most solemn duty is to show forth that God who is love in the World.

In 1957, the elders and eldresses of Canterbury Shaker Village elected to permanently close the "covenant" for new Shaker membership in light of there being only a handful of surviving members. The village dissolved by 1992, leaving only Sabbathday Lake open.

On January 2, 2017, Frances Carr died aged 89 at the Sabbathday community, leaving only two remaining Shakers: Arnold Hadd, age 58, and June Carpenter, 77. A profile of the Shaker community at Sabbathday Lake, published in The New York Times in September 2024, describes Hadd and Carpenter, preparing to celebrate the 250th anniversary of Lee's arrival in New York. Hadd said: "We've survived 250 years. We are looking forward as much as our ancestors did to the next — whatever that involves. All we have to do is be ready." The Spring/Summer 2019 issue of the Shaker newsletter The Clarion also makes reference to a Brother Andrew. These remaining Shakers hope that sincere newcomers will join them.

The Shakers at Sabbathday Lake "stressed the autonomy of each local community," declaring that even though the Shaker covenant remains closed (technically preventing new Shakers from joining), they are willing to accept them nonetheless. The Sabbathday Lake Shaker Community receives around two enquiries every week.

In August 2025, April Baxter started living with the Sabbathday Lake Shaker Community. This raised the number of active Shakers in the United States to three.

Sister June Carpenter passed away on November 3, 2026 at the age of 88, reducing the number of active members to two.

== Leadership ==
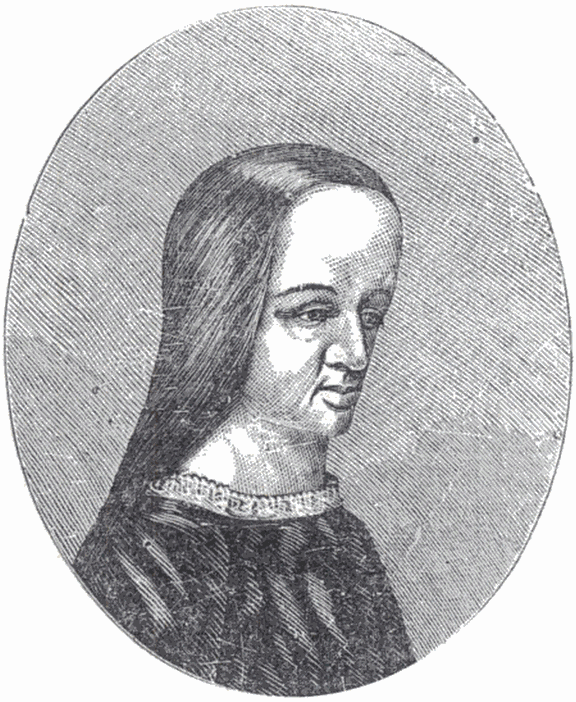
Engraving believed by 18th-century Shakers to be of Mother Ann Lee

Four Shakers led the society from 1772 until 1821.

1. Mother Ann Lee (1772–1784)
2. Father James Whittaker (1784–1787)
3. Father Joseph Meacham (1787–1796)
4. Mother Lucy Wright (1796–1821)

After 1821, there was no one single leader but rather a small nucleus of elders and eldresses with authority over all the Shaker villages, each with their own teams of elders and eldresses who were subordinate to the ministry.

The Shaker ministry continued to build the society after Wright died in 1821:

- Elder Ebenezer Bishop (1768–1849), Elder Rufus Bishop (1774–1852), Eldress Ruth Landon (1775–1850), Eldress Asenath Clark (1821–1857).

Subsequent members of the Shaker Ministry included:

- Elder Daniel Boler (1804–1892), Elder Giles Avery (1815–1890), Eldress Betsy Bates (1798–1869), and Eldress Eliza Ann Taylor (1811–1897).
- Eldress Polly Reed (1818–1881) was also known as an artist who created Shaker gift drawings such as "A present from Mother Lucy to Eliza Ann Taylor", 1851 (above) in the 1840s and 1850s.
- Eldress Harriet Bullard (1824–1916)
- Elder Frederick William Evans (1858–?)
- Eldress Frances Hall (1947–1957)
- Eldress Emma King (1957–?)
- Eldress Gertrude Soule and Eldress Bertha Lindsay (?–early 1990s)
- Elder Arnold Hadd & Eldress June Carpenter (? – present)

== Theology ==
=== Dualism ===
Shaker theology is based on the idea of the dualism of God as male and female: "So God created human beings in his own image. In the image of God he created them; male and female he created them." Genesis 1:27. This passage was interpreted as showing the dual nature of the Creator.

=== First and second coming ===
Shakers believed that Jesus, born of a woman, the son of a Jewish carpenter, was the male manifestation of Christ and the first Christian Church; and that Mother Ann, daughter of an English blacksmith, was the female manifestation of Christ and the second Christian Church (which the Shakers believed themselves to be). She was seen as the Bride made ready for the Bridegroom, and in her, the promises of the Second Coming were fulfilled.

=== Nature of God ===
Because of the adoptionist view of Christ becoming divine only during his baptism and the dualist idea that God was to be expressed in male and female genders, Shakers are sometimes viewed as being nontrinitarian. However, modern-day Shakers profess the divinity of Christ and claim that Shaker dualism is because "God has no sex in our human understanding of the term; yet being pure spirit He may best be thought of by man with his limited power of comprehension as having the attributes of both maleness and femaleness." The Trinity is not viewed as being false. Instead, Shakers argue that the Trinity has been misinterpreted for being completely masculine. Lee's embodiment of Christ thus completed the Trinity by fulfilling the female aspect of God.

=== Ethics ===
Adam's sin was understood to be sex, which was considered to be an act of impurity. Therefore, marriage was abolished within the body of the Believers in the Second Appearance, which was patterned after the Kingdom of God, in which there would be no marriage or giving in marriage. The four highest Shaker virtues are virgin purity, communalism, confession of sin – without which one could not become a believer – and separation from the world.

Lee's doctrine was that confession of sins is the door to the spiritual regeneration and absolute celibacy is the rule of life. Shakers were known to be so chaste that men and women avoided even small instances of physical contact such as shaking hands, going up and down stairs, or assisting with heavy loads.

=== Equality ===
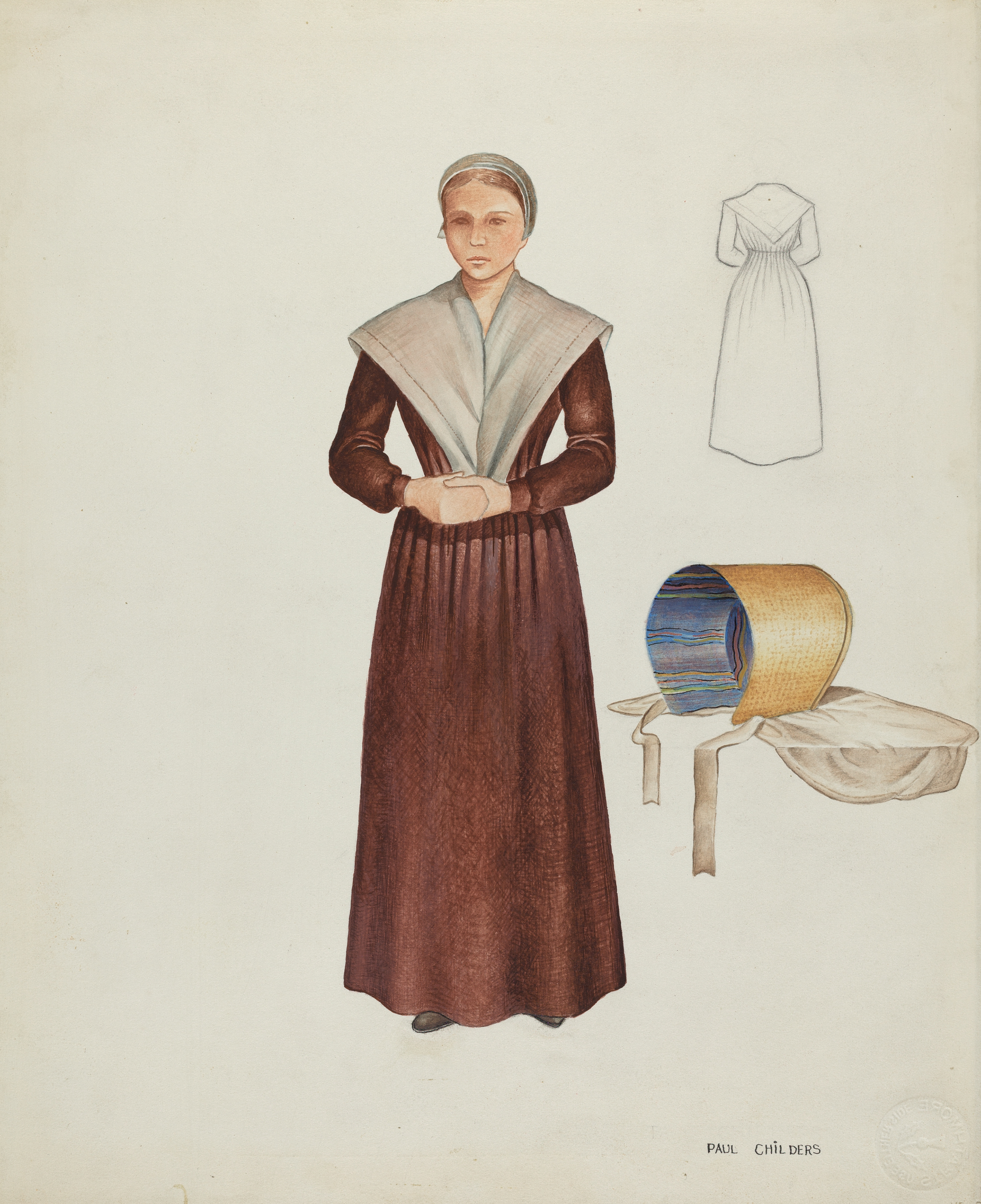
William Paul Childers, Shaker Costume, c. 1937. Image from collection of National Gallery of Art, Washington, D.C.

Enshrined in Shaker doctrine is a belief in racial equality and gender equality. Shaker religion values women and men equally in religious leadership. The church was hierarchical, and at each level women and men shared authority. This was reflective of the Shaker belief that God was both female and male. They believed men and women were equal in the sight of God, and should be treated equally on Earth, too. Thus two elders and two eldresses formed the Ministry at the top of the administrative structure. Two lower-ranking elders and two eldresses led each family, women overseeing women and men overseeing men. This allowed the continuation of church leadership when there was a shortage of men.

=== Celibacy and children ===
Shakers were celibate; procreation was forbidden after they joined the society (except for women who were already pregnant at admission). Children were added to their communities through indenture, adoption, or conversion. Occasionally a foundling was anonymously left on a Shaker doorstep. They welcomed all, often taking in orphans and the homeless. For children, Shaker life was structured, safe and predictable, with no shortage of adults who cared about their young charges.

When Shaker youths, girls and boys, reached the age of 21, they were permitted to choose whether to leave or fully convert to the Shaker faith. Unwilling to remain celibate, many chose to leave; today there are thousands of descendants of Shaker-raised seceders.

In their labor, Shakers followed traditional gender work-related roles. To prevent gender mixing and thus preserve chastity, Shaker homes and workrooms were segregated into men and women's areas. Women worked indoors spinning, weaving, cooking, sewing, cleaning, washing, and making or packaging goods for sale. In good weather, groups of Shaker women were outdoors, gardening and gathering wild herbs for sale or home consumption. Men worked in the fields doing farm work and in their shops at crafts and trades.

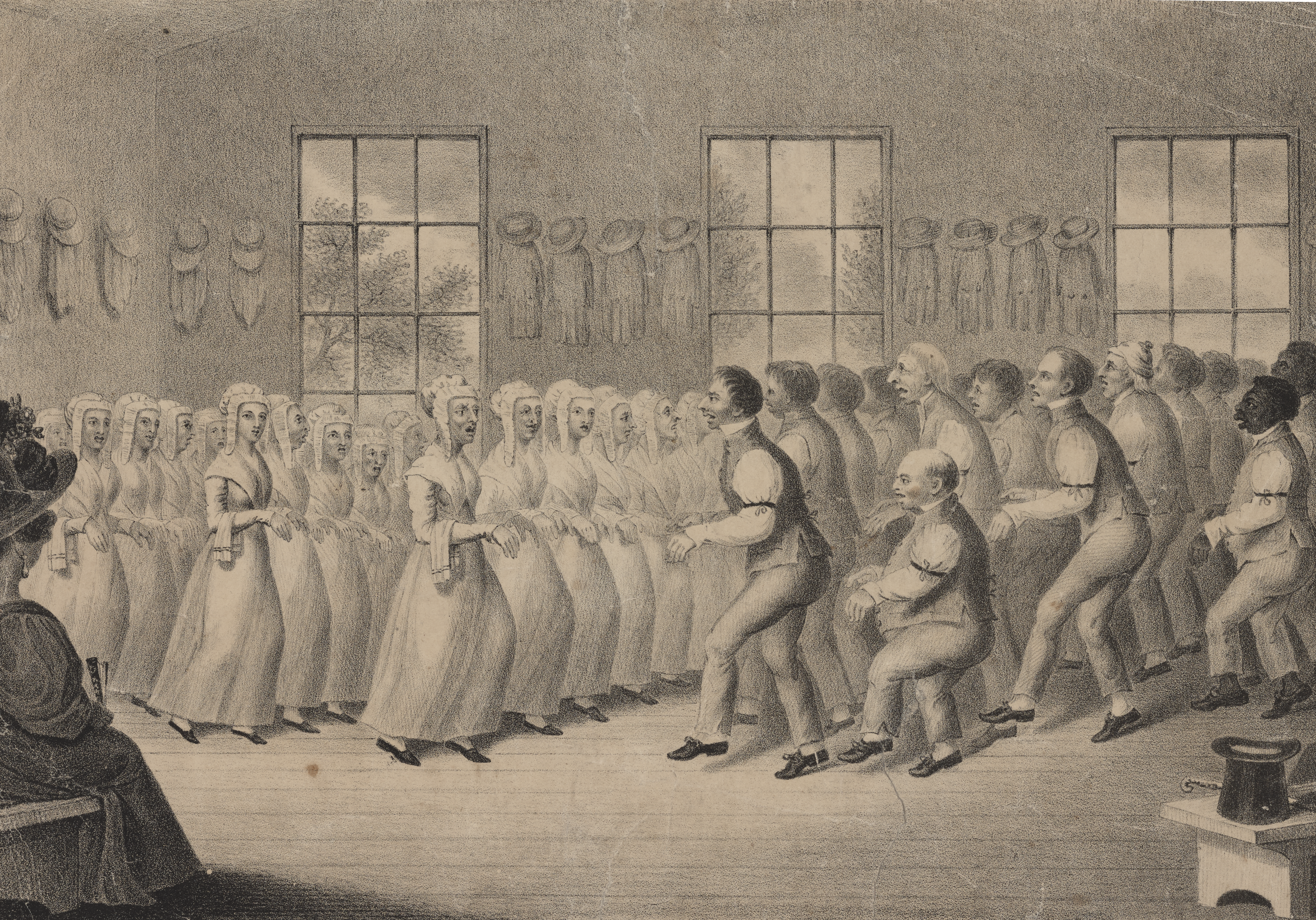
Lithograph of Shakers during worship circa 1830-1839

=== Worship ===
Shakers worshipped in meetinghouses painted white and unadorned; pulpits and decorations were eschewed as worldly things. In meeting, they marched, sang, danced, and sometimes turned, twitched, jerked, or shouted. The earliest Shaker worship services were unstructured, loud, chaotic and emotional. However, Shakers later developed precisely choreographed dances and orderly marches accompanied by symbolic gestures. Many outsiders disapproved of or mocked Shakers' mode of worship without understanding the symbolism of their movements or the content of their songs.

== Shaker communities ==
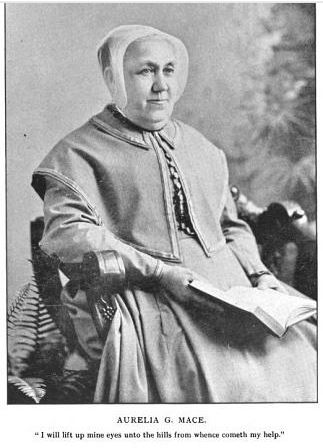
Aurelia Gay Mace, leader of Sabbathday Lake Shaker Village, New Gloucester, Maine. She was the author of The Aletheia: Spirit of Truth, a Series of Letters in Which the Principles of the United Society Known as Shakers are Set Forth and Illustrated (1899), and The Mission and Testimony of the Shakers of the Twentieth Century to the World (1904).

The Shakers built more than twenty communities in the United States. Women and men shared leadership of the communities. Women preached and received revelations as the Spirit fell upon them. Thriving on the religious enthusiasm of the first and second Great Awakenings, the Shakers declared their messianic, communitarian message with significant response. One early convert observed: "The wisdom of their instructions, the purity of their doctrine, their Christ-like deportment, and the simplicity of their manners, all appeared truly apostolical." The Shakers represent a utopian response to the gospel. Preaching in their communities knew no boundaries of gender, social class, or education.

== Economics ==
The communality of the Believers was an economic success, and their cleanliness, honesty and frugality received the highest praise. All Shaker villages ran farms, using the latest scientific methods in agriculture. They raised most of their own food, so farming, and preserving the produce required to feed them through the winter, had to be priorities. Their livestock were fat and healthy, and their barns were commended for convenience and efficiency. When not doing farm work, Shaker brethren pursued a variety of trades and hand crafts, many documented by Isaac N. Youngs. When not doing housework, Shaker sisters did likewise, spinning, weaving, sewing, and making sale goods—baskets, brushes, bonnets, brooms, fancy goods, and homespun fabric that was known for high quality, but were more famous for their medicinal herbs, garden seeds of the Shaker Seed Company, apple sauce, and knitted garments. Some communities, especially those in New England, produced maple syrup for sale as well.

Shakers ran a variety of businesses to support their communities; many Shaker villages had their own tanneries. The Shaker goal in their labor was perfection. Lee's followers preserved her admonitions about work:

Good spirits will not live where there is dirt.

Do your work as though you had a thousand years to live and as if you were to die tomorrow.

Put your hands to work, and your heart to God.

Mother Ann also cautioned them against getting into debt.

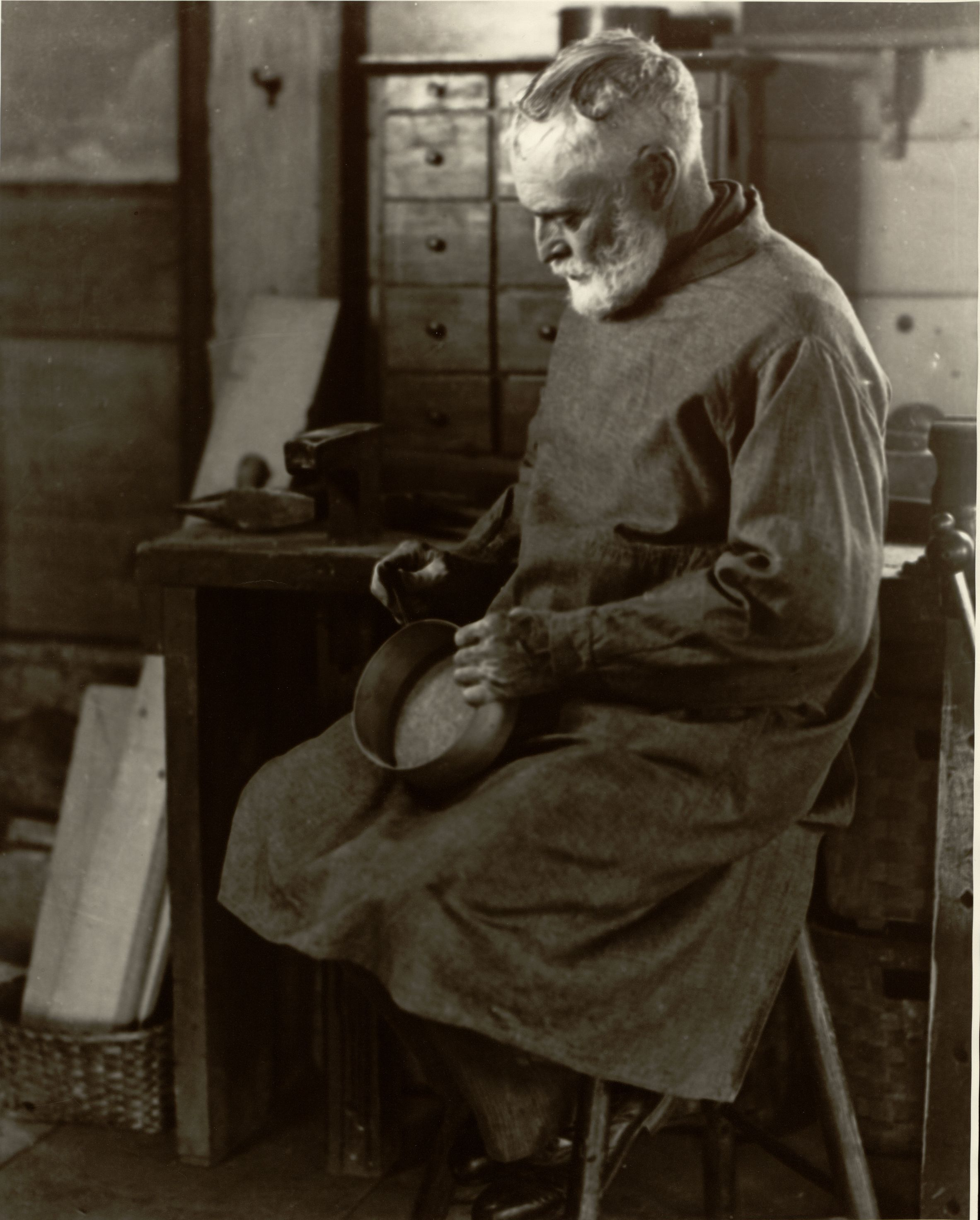
Shaker box-maker Ricardo Belden (Pittsfield, Massachusetts, 1935)

Shaker craftsmen were known for a style of Shaker furniture that was plain in style, durable, and functional. Around the time of the Civil War, the Shakers at Mount Lebanon, New York, increased their production and marketing of Shaker chairs. They were so successful that several furniture companies produced their own versions of "Shaker" chairs. Because of the quality of their craftsmanship, original Shaker furniture is costly. Shakers gained respect and admiration for their productive farms and orderly communities.

Their industry brought about many industrial improvements, such as perfecting Babbitt metal, and inventing the rotary harrow, the circular saw, the clothespin, the Shaker peg, the flat broom, the wheel-driven washing machine, a machine for setting teeth in textile cards, a threshing machine, metal pens, a new type of fire engine, a machine for matching boards, numerous innovations in waterworks, planing machinery, a hernia truss, silk reeling machinery, small looms for weaving palm leaf, machines for processing broom corn, ball-and-socket tilters for chair legs, and a number of other useful inventions. Even prolific Shaker inventors like Tabitha Babbit did not patent their inventions before or after putting them into practice, which has complicated subsequent efforts by 20th-century historians to assign priority.

Shakers were the first large producers of medicinal herbs in the United States and pioneers in the sale of seeds in paper packets. Brethren grew the crops, but sisters picked, sorted, and packaged their products for sale, so those industries were built on a foundation of women's labor in the Shaker partnership between the sexes.

The Shakers believed in the value of hard work and kept comfortably busy. Mother Ann said: "Labor to make the way of God your own; let it be your inheritance, your treasure, your occupation, your daily calling."

== Architecture and furnishings ==
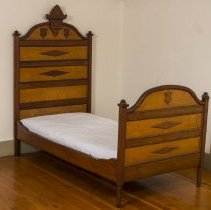
Ornate Shaker Bed, Enfield, New Hampshire, c. 1880.

The Shakers' dedication to hard work and perfection has resulted in a unique range of architecture, furniture and handicraft styles. They designed their furniture with care, believing that making something well was in itself an act of prayer. Before the late 18th century, they rarely fashioned items with elaborate details or extra decoration, but only made things for their intended uses. The ladderback chair was a popular piece of furniture. Shaker craftsmen made most things out of pine or other inexpensive woods and hence their furniture was light in color and weight.

The earliest Shaker buildings (late 18th – early 19th century) in the northeast were timber or stone buildings built in a plain but elegant New England colonial style. Early 19th-century Shaker interiors are characterized by an austerity and simplicity. For example, they had a "peg rail", a continuous wooden device like a pelmet with hooks running all along it near the lintel level. They used the pegs to hang up clothes, hats, and very light furniture pieces such as chairs when not in use. The simple architecture of their homes, meeting houses, and barns has had a lasting influence on American architecture and design. At the end of the 19th century, however, Shakers adopted some aspects of Victorian decor, such as ornate carved furniture, patterned linoleum, and cabbage-rose wallpaper. Examples are on display in the Hancock Shaker Village Trustees' Office, a formerly spare, plain building "improved" with ornate additions such as fish-scale siding, bay windows, porches, and a tower.

== Culture ==
=== Artifacts ===
By the middle of the 20th century, as the Shaker communities were disappearing, some American collectors whose visual tastes were formed by the stark aspects of the modernist movement found themselves drawn to the spare artifacts of Shaker culture, in which "form follows function" was also clearly expressed. Kaare Klint, an architect and furniture designer, used styles from Shaker furniture in his work.

Other artifacts of Shaker culture are their spirit drawings, dances, and songs, which are important genres of Shaker folk art. Doris Humphrey, an innovator in technique, choreography, and theory of dance movement, made a full theatrical art with her dance entitled Dance of The Chosen, which depicted Shaker religious fervor.

The largest collection of Shaker artifacts is the Robert and Virginia Jones Shaker collection at Harmon Museum, in Lebanon, Ohio.

=== Music ===
The Shakers composed thousands of songs and also created many dances; both were an important part of the Shaker worship services. In Shaker society, a spiritual "gift" could be a musical revelation, and they considered it important to record musical inspirations as they occurred.

Scribes, many of whom had no formal musical training, used a form of music notation called the letteral system. This method used letters of the alphabet, often not positioned on a staff, along with a simple notation of conventional rhythmic values, and has a curious, and coincidental, similarity to some ancient Greek music notation.

Many of the lyrics to Shaker tunes consist of syllables and words from unknown tongues, the musical equivalent of glossolalia. It has been surmised that many of them were imitated from the sounds of Native American languages, as well as from the songs of African slaves, especially in the southernmost of the Shaker communities, but in fact the melodic material is derived from European scales and modes.

Most early Shaker music is monodic, that is to say, composed of a single melodic line with no harmonization. The tunes and scales recall the folk songs of the British Isles, but since the music was written down and carefully preserved, it is "art" music of a special kind rather than folklore. Many melodies are of extraordinary grace and beauty, and the Shaker song repertoire, though still relatively little known, is an important part of the American cultural heritage and of world religious music in general.

Shakers' earliest hymns were shared by word of mouth and letters circulated among their villages. Many believers wrote out the lyrics in their own manuscript hymnals. In 1813, they published Millennial Praises, a hymnal containing only lyrics.

After the Civil War, the Shakers published hymnbooks with both lyrics and music in conventional four-part harmonies. These works are less strikingly original than the earlier, monodic repertoire. The songs, hymns, and anthems were sung by the Shakers usually at the beginning of their Sunday worship. Their last hymnbook was published in 1908 at Canterbury, New Hampshire.

The surviving Shakers sing songs drawn from both the earlier repertoire and the four-part songbooks. They perform all of these unaccompanied, in single-line unison singing. The many recent, harmonized arrangements of older Shaker songs for choirs and instrumental groups mark a departure from traditional Shaker practice.

Simple Gifts was composed in 1848 by Elder Joseph Brackett, on or about the time he moved to the Shaker community at Alfred, Maine. English poet and songwriter Sydney Carter used the song as the basis for a hymn in 1963 "Lord of the Dance", also referenced as "I Am the Dance". Some scholars, such as Daniel W. Patterson and Roger Lee Hall, have compiled books of Shaker songs, and groups have been formed to sing the songs and perform the dances.

The most extensive recordings of the Shakers singing their own music were made between 1960 and 1980 and released on a 2-CD set with illustrated booklet, Let Zion Move: Music of the Shakers. Other recordings are available of Shaker songs, both documentation of singing by the Shakers themselves, as well as songs recorded by other groups (see external links). Two widely distributed commercial recordings by The Boston Camerata, "Simple Gifts" (1995) and "The Golden Harvest" (2000), were recorded at the Shaker community of Sabbathday Lake, Maine, with active cooperation from the surviving Shakers, whose singing can be heard at several points on both recordings.

Aaron Copland's 1944 ballet score Appalachian Spring, written for Martha Graham, uses the Shaker tune "Simple Gifts" as the basis of its finale. Given to Graham with the working title "Ballet for Martha", it was named by her for the scenario she had in mind, though Copland often said he was thinking of neither Appalachia nor a spring while he wrote it. Shakers did, in fact, worship on Holy Mount in the Appalachians. Laboring Songs, a piece composed by Dan Welcher in 1997 for large wind ensemble, is based upon traditional Shaker tunes including "Turn to the Right" and "Come Life, Shaker Life".

== Education ==
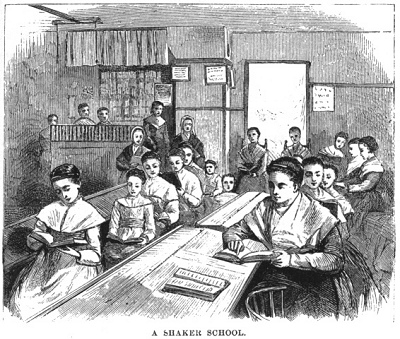
A Shaker School, The Communistic Societies of the United States by Charles Nordhoff, 1875

In New Lebanon, New York, Shakers began keeping school in 1815. Certified as a public school by the state of New York beginning in 1817, the teachers operated on the Lancasterian system, which was considered advanced for its time. Boys attended class during the winter and the girls in the summer. The first Shaker schools taught reading, spelling, oration, arithmetic and manners, but later diversified their coursework to include music, algebra, astronomy, and agricultural chemistry.

Non-Shaker parents respected the Shakers' schooling so much that they often took advantage of schools that the Shaker villages provided, sending their children there for an education. State inspectors and other outsiders visited the schools and made favorable comments on teachers and students.

== Modern-day Shakers ==
Turnover was high; the group reached maximum size of about 5,000 full members in 1840, and 6,000 believers at the peak of the Shaker movement. The Shaker communities continued to lose members, partly through attrition, since believers did not give birth to children, and also due to economics; products hand-made by Shakers could not compete with mass-produced products and individuals moved to the cities for better livelihoods. There were only 12 Shaker communities left by 1920.

In 1957, after "months of prayer", Eldresses Gertrude, Emma, and Ida, leaders of the United Society of Believers in Canterbury Shaker Village, voted to close the Shaker Covenant, the document which all new members need to sign to become members of the Shakers in Canterbury Shaker Village. In 1988, speaking about the three men and women in their 20s and 30s who had become Shakers and were living in the Sabbathday Lake Shaker Village, Eldress Bertha Lindsay of Canterbury Shaker Village disputed their membership in the society: "To become a Shaker you have to sign a legal document taking the necessary vows and that document, the official covenant, is locked up in our safe. Membership is closed forever."

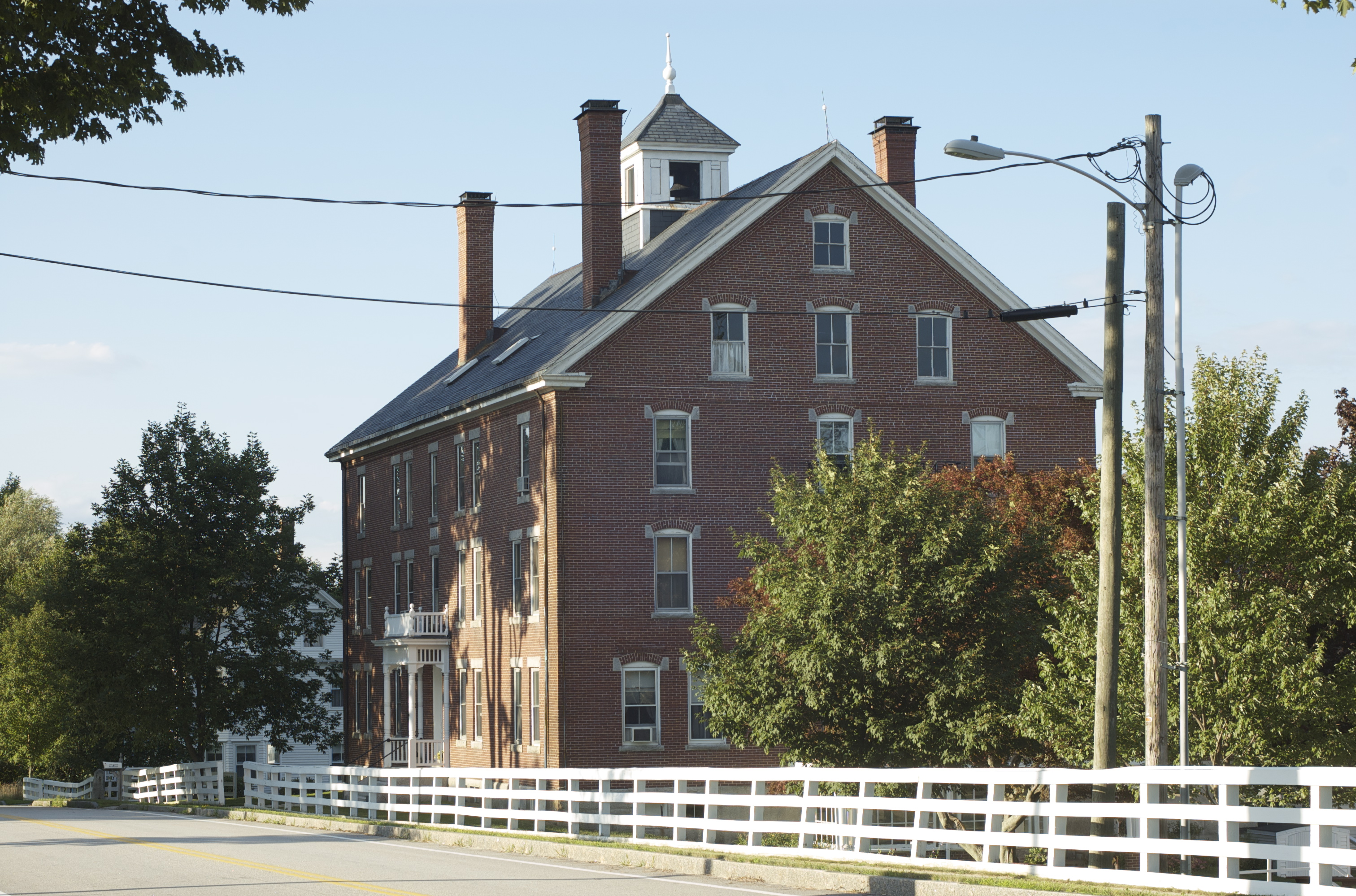
The dwelling house at Sabbathday Lake Shaker Village, the only active Shaker community, located in New Gloucester, Maine

However, Shaker covenants lack a "sunset clause" and today's Shakers of Sabbathday Lake Shaker Village welcome serious new converts to Shakerism into the society:

If someone wants to become a Shaker, and the Shakers assent, the would-be member can move into the dwelling house. If the novices, as they are called, stay a week, they sign an articles [sic] of agreement, which protects the colony from being sued for lost wages. After a year, the Shakers will take a vote whether to allow the novice in, but it takes another four years to be granted full Shaker status in sharing in the colony's finances and administrative and worship decisions.

On January 2, 2017, Frances Carr died at the Sabbathday community, leaving only two remaining Shakers: Arnold Hadd and June Carpenter. In the Spring/Summer 2019 issue of the Shaker newsletter The Clarion, the current membership was given as Brother Arnold, Sister June, and Brother Andrew. These remaining Shakers still hope that sincere newcomers will join them. In September 2024, the New York Times published an article about the last two remaining members of the community. In August 2025, NPR reported that April Baxter had joined the community but was not yet a full member. June Carpenter died on November 3, 2026.

== See also ==
- Anti-Shaker
- Antinatalism
- Antisexualism
- Leman Copley
- Corbett's electrostatic machine
- Heart in Hand
- It Beats the Shakers
- New Forest Shakers
- Peace churches
- Shaker broom vise
- Shaker Farm
- Shaker tilting chair
- Shakertown Pledge
