= Shaker Village Work Group =

Summer camp in New York State (1947–1973)

Coordinates: 42.4432°N 73.3806°W

The Shaker Village Work Group was a recreational summer camp and teen educational program that occupied historic Shaker land and buildings in New Lebanon, New York. The property was purchased by founders Jerome (Jerry) and Sybil A. Count from the Mount Lebanon Shaker Village community in 1946, and was opened to its first group of young "villagers" as the Shaker Village Work Camp in 1947. Around 1960, the Work Camp's name was changed to the Shaker Village Work Group. Operating until 1973, the Shaker Village Work Group was noteworthy as a program that gave urban youths the opportunity to learn skilled hands-on work through folk crafts, for its efforts to preserve Shaker architecture and culture, for its role in the American folk music revival of the 1950s and 60s, and for its influence on the 1960s counterculture movement.

During its twenty-six year span the Shaker Village Work Group presented a microcosm of American work and political ideals, weaving together the Protestant work ethic and communitarianism of the Shakers, the labor movement's celebration of ordinary working class manual labor, and libertarian ideals of self-sufficiency and self-ownership.

== Beginnings ==
The Shaker Village Work Group operated on land formerly owned by the Mount Lebanon Shaker Society, the Shaker community that built and occupied the Mount Lebanon Shaker Village from 1787 until its population became too small to make use of it. Under the Shakers, the Village was organized into "Families" that occupied clusters of buildings sited around the property. The Church Family site was sold to and is currently occupied by the Darrow School. The North Family site is currently owned, preserved and being restored by the Shaker Museum, Mount Lebanon. Jerry and Sybil Count purchased the South Family and West Family land for their planned youth work camp in 1946.

The "work camp" part of the Shaker Village Work Camp name is rooted in the 1930s. As part of government efforts to help the United States escape the Great Depression of the 1930s, the Civilian Conservation Corps (CCC) was established and operated between 1933 and 1942 to train unemployed young men in useful manual labor job skills and also to provide employment for them in public works projects. Large scale CCC projects were sometimes accompanied by what were called "work camps," in which up to 200 workers were housed together and which operated under a quasi-military organization. During World War II, some of the work camps were re-purposed by the Civilian Public Service to provide conscientious objectors an alternative to military service. After World War II, informed by these earlier public service work camps, many new "progressive work camps" were created for teenagers and young adults to let them "visit and labor in fields and factories," to provide "work experience for youth under expert counselors," "to help children understand the democratic roots of their country," or to "teach neighborliness, public service, respect for manual labor, [and] self-government." For at least some of these new work camps, the "word work in 'work camp' signified a solidarity with labor on the part of the affluent, progressive middle class."

The Counts opened the Shaker Village Work Camp as one of these new progressive work camps. There, urban teenage boys and girls would learn manual skills for the purposes of building character and to preserve and celebrate the crafts and work ethic of the Shaker culture. Some alumni of the work camp's early years have noted what Villager and artist Henry Halem called the "very socialist" character of the Village. Describing his time at the newly opened Shaker Village Work Camp, philosopher Robert Paul Wolff wrote, "Many of the counselors had roots in the various progressive movements that had emerged during the depression, though whether any were actually members of the Communist Party I never knew." Some later attending Villagers have stated that this character was not apparent by the 1960s, and that Jerry Count was more concerned with "work education" than "socialism for the sake of socialism."

According to a participant in 1954–55, one very important element has not received sufficient attention: there was a definite utopian vision of the social organization of work, one which differed fundamentally from the official vision promoted by the communist party, which argues strongly against the Count's affiliation to that party, or at least their approval of the official line.

The emphasis on work received a very broad definition, including manual labor and intellectual, cultural, artistic efforts. In addition, very importantly, the work was very democratically organized, with emphasis on complete equality on all counts. At least during those years, tasks were distributed on a weekly basis, with functional chores for maintenance of the camp done in the morning, and more cultural or artistic work occupying the afternoons. The shifts changed regularly, through an extremely simple system, with sheets of paper posted inside the barn (the main indoor meeting place) designating the tasks and the number of people needed, on which all participants were to sign up for the various tasks and activities, with freedom of choice and incitement to change regularly.

There were also general meetings, under a large, central tree, at which a mayor was chosen (probably weekly), and all problems or decisions affecting the group were debated.

An unusual feature of the Shaker Village Work Group compared to typical summer camps was the extent to which the Villagers were autonomous, without direct counselor supervision. For example, the Villagers were entitled to set their bedtime hour by voting as a community.

== Preservation of Shaker architecture and culture ==
The United Society of Believers in Christ's Second Appearing, known as the Shakers, were a small Protestant Christian sect that is known today primarily for their cultural contributions, particularly in music, furniture and folk crafts (particularly baskets and boxes). They tied religious devotion to hard work, as exemplified by one of their founder Mother Ann Lee's mottoes, "Put your hands to work, and your heart to God."

The Shakers' cultural traditions made them an excellent model for the kind of youth work camp that Jerry and Sybil Count were seeking to establish. "The Counts learned about the Shakers' high standards of conduct and workmanship, their forsaking of material ownership and pride, their fabled tolerance, gender equality, and non-violence. The Shakers learned of the Counts' plans and ideals for a youth camp and heartily approved sale [of the land] for that use. The Shaker Village Work Camp opened in 1947 not only with Shaker approval but also with frequent appearances of those Shakers who could still get around."

Robert Paul Wolff, who attended for the first three years of the Village's existence, says that it "celebrated labor, along with folklore and the arts." He recounted his work restoring one of the old Shaker buildings: "The building was in very bad shape, so one of our major work projects was to renovate it. This involved not only pulling old plaster and lathe from the attic walls, but also making new pegs for the peg boards. ... I learned how to use a wood turning lathe and spent many happy hours turning new pegs." He concludes, "Shaker Village was unabashedly idealistic in its celebration of manual labor, community democracy, and folk culture."

A 1962 Sports Illustrated article described the Shaker Village Work Group activities as "restoring the original village, repairing and rebuilding the historic buildings and reviving some of the Early American industries and crafts such as weaving, herb raising and woodcraft. The 'villagers' raise livestock, do farming and forestry work, landscaping and beekeeping." As a teen, author and Harvard professor Marjorie Garber refused to attend the Shaker Village as her parents wished because, "Teenagers who attended work camps wore denim and flannel shirts and learned about folk songs, barn construction, leftist politics, and sex—so far as I know."

In their 2004 book A Shaker Musical Legacy, Robert C. Opdahl and Viola E. Woodruff Opdahl provide some detailed descriptions of the Work Group's activities under Shaker tutelage, with an emphasis on Shaker music, but also including crafts, dance, and even the performance of a Shaker prayer service.

The Shaker Village Work Camp (and later Work Group) produced two Shaker songbooks with scores (Songs of the Shakers, 1956; Songs of the Shakers, 1962), two phonograph albums of Shaker songs sung by the teenage Villagers (14 Shaker Folk Songs, 1959 which featured an introduction by Shaker Brother Ricardo Belden; and Shaker Folk Songs, 1952), and a book of Shaker recipes (Shaker Desserts and Sweets). A book of Shaker songs, with some history of the Shaker Village Work Group, was released in 2004 by two alumni of the Village. The Shaker Village Work Group was also featured in a 1966 episode of the television series Tony Saletan's What's New on National Educational Television (NET), the precursor to the Public Broadcasting Service (PBS). An article was written by Roger Hall in 1996 about singing at the Shaker Village Work Camp.

== Role in the American folk music revival ==
During the 1950s, some folk musicians "looked to summer camps and resorts as areas ripe for the introduction of folk music," and spent their summers touring among the rural camps, resorts and festivals. For example, folksinger and social activist "Pete Seeger used to come and play" at the Village.

In 1954, Tony Saletan had been working as folksong leader at the Shaker Village Work Camp, and was searching the Widener Library of Harvard University for material to teach the Villagers that summer. He adapted the song Michael Row the Boat Ashore from the 1867 songbook Slave Songs of the United States to create the version that's well-known today. "I judged that the tune was very singable, added some harmony (a guitar accompaniment) and thought the one-word chorus would be an easy hit with the teens (it was). But a typical original verse consisted of one line repeated once, and I thought a rhyme would be more interesting to the teenagers at Shaker Village Work Camp, where I introduced it. So I adapted traditional African-American couplets in place of the original verses." Saletan's adaptation was included in the Village's 1954 songbook, Songs of Work.

That summer, Saletan taught Michael Row the Boat Ashore to Pete Seeger, who later sang it with the Weavers, one of the most important singing groups leading the American folk music revival of the 1950s to mid-1960s. A #1 hit-single based on Saletan's version was released in 1961 by the American folk quintet the Highwaymen under the abbreviated title, Michael. Joe Hickerson, co-founder of the Folksmiths, credits Saletan for introducing him to the song Kumbaya in 1957 (Saletan had learned it from Lynn Rohrbough, co-proprietor with his wife Katherine of the camp songbook publisher Cooperative Recreation Service). The first LP recording of Kumbaya was released in 1958 by the Folksmiths. Folksinger Peggy Seeger was also taught several songs by Saletan, which she later recorded.

Saletan went on to host a public television series for children, Let's All Sing with Tony Saletan, with an associated album mostly drawn from American folksongs, including those discovered and developed for teaching young Villagers. In 1970, he released an album, Tony and Irene Saletan: Folk Songs and Ballads with his then-wife, Irene (formerly and subsequently of the Kossoy Sisters), on Folk-Legacy Records. Saletan also released the albums I'm a Stranger Here on Prestige Records (1961 or 1962), Song Bag with Tony Saletan and an associated teacher's guide and songbook, Songs and Sounds of the Sea (National Geographic Society 1973), Revolutionary Tea (with the Yankee Tunesmiths, Old North Bridge Records 1975), and George & Ruth (songs of the Spanish Civil War, Educational Alternatives 2004).

== Endings ==
After Jerry Count died in 1968, his wife Sybil kept the Shaker Village Work Group running for four more years, through the 1972 season. Bill and Cornelia Cotton were the operational directors the last few years. In 1975, the South Family and most of the West Family land was sold to the Sufi Order International, which established on it a spiritual intentional community, the Abode of the Message. Sybil Count died in 1996. After the New Lebanon facility was closed, the T.E.E.N.S. Global Democracy Project of the Shaker Village Educational Work Foundation, Inc. has continued some aspects of the Count family's work. Shaker Village Work Group alumni continue to maintain contact through various means, including a Facebook group.

== See also ==
- Tony Saletan
- American folk music revival
- Mount Lebanon Shaker Society
