= The Abode of the Message =

Headquarters of the Inayati Sufi order

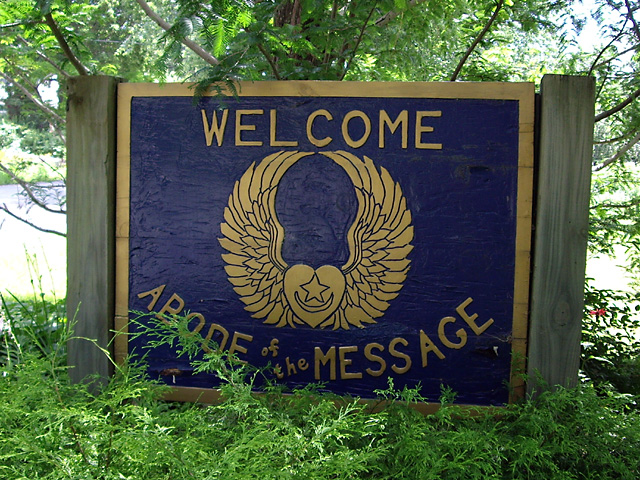
- Photo of former sign with Welcome at the top, winged heart below, and Abode of the Message at the bottom
- Founded: 1975
- Founder: Vilayat Inayat Khan
- Location: 5 Abode Road, New Lebanon, NY, USA
- Coordinates: 42°26′36″N 73°22′44″W
- Origins: Inayati Order
- Method: Spiritual intentional community; Conference & retreat center; Former headquarters of the Inayati Order
- Website: theabode.org

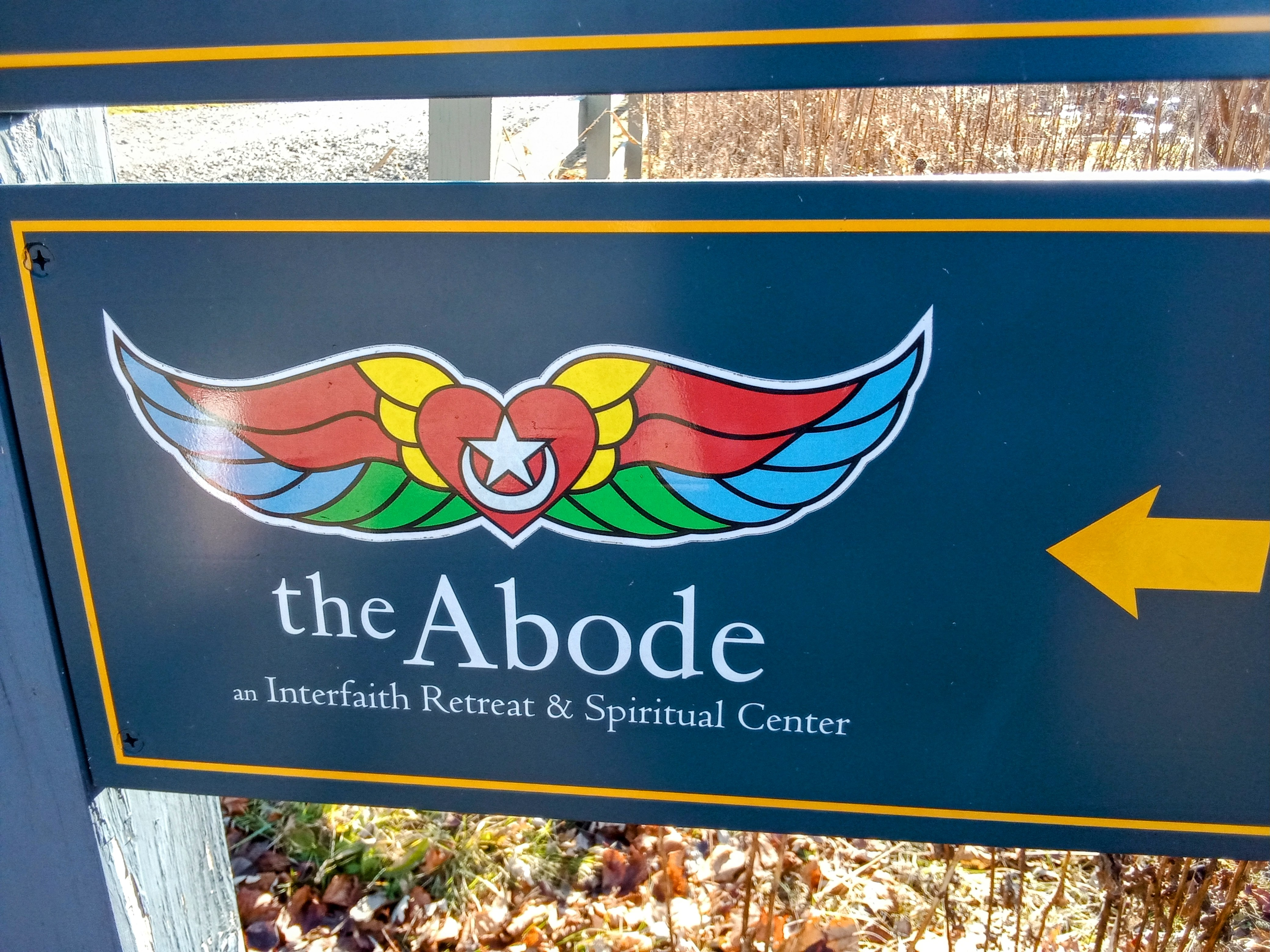
The Welcome Sign at The Abode in 2025

The Abode of the Message is a retreat center in New Lebanon, NY which was founded in 1975 by Vilayat Inayat Khan and a group of his students. The Abode has a long history as a residential community, a centralized location for the Inayati order, a conference and retreat center, and a center of esoteric study. In 2023, its management was transferred to Friends of South Family. The property is located in the eastern heights of the Taconic Mountains in New Lebanon, New York, and includes historic Shaker buildings built between 1834 and 1870.

The described intent of the Abode on its founding was stated: to "collectively embody spiritual awakening," through "mutual commitment to practicing...the Sufi teachings," "shared devotion to the ideals of Love, Harmony and Beauty, and to the specific transformational work whereby these ideals are progressively realized," for "mutual dedication and visionary collaboration."

== History of the site ==
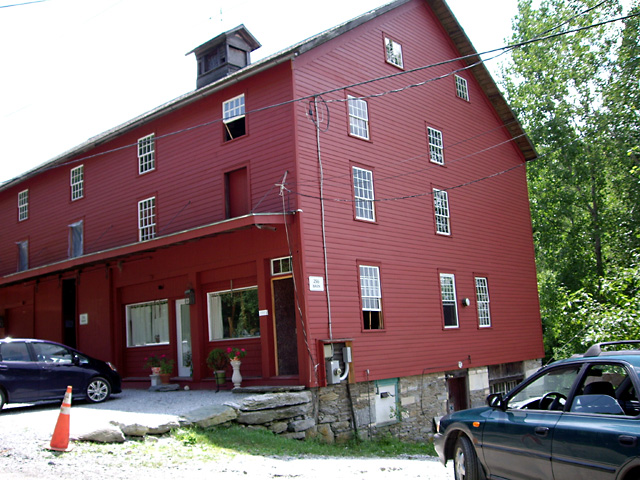
Shaker Barn, the Shaker community's horse barn

Most of the Abode's Main Campus structures were built in the mid-19th century by the Mount Lebanon Shaker Village community as housing and workspaces for their South Family group. Formally established in 1787, the New Lebanon Shaker Society (renamed the Mount Lebanon Shaker Society in 1861) was the second major Shaker society formed in the recently created United States of America. The society established its home at the Mount Lebanon Shaker Village, which became the primary Shaker spiritual residential community.

The Mount Lebanon Shaker Village was organized into Family groups living in clustered buildings sited around the property. As of 2010, three main groups of buildings survive. The Church Family property is occupied by the Darrow School, a private residential high school. The North Family property is occupied and being restored by the Shaker Museum, Mount Lebanon. The South Family property was owned by the Shaker Village Work Group (a camp for urban teenagers established in 1947 as the Shaker Village Work Camp and later renamed) until it was purchased in 1975 for the Inayati Order, which established it as a new residential spiritual community—The Abode of the Message.

In April 2022, the Inayati Order announced that they could no longer hold financial responsibility for the Abode, and expressed the hope "to sell to a compatible and aligned organization that would continue to hold the land as sacred." In 2023, an agreement was reached between the Order and the Friends of South Family "to transfer sole membership in the Abode to [the] Friends."

== Facilities ==
The Abode occupies approximately 320 acres (1.3 km^{2}) of forest that spans the border between New York State and Massachusetts. Most of its shared community facilities are grouped within two areas, the Main Campus and the Mountain Conference Center.

=== Main Campus ===
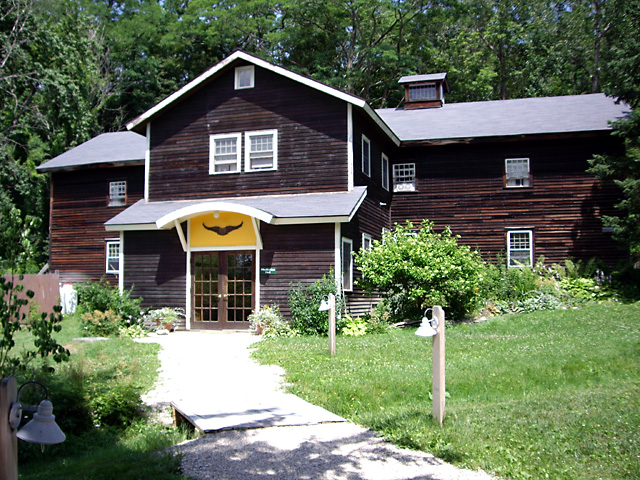
Meditation Hall on the Main Campus, a replica of a Shaker-style apple barn.

The Main Campus is a cluster of buildings at the south end of Darrow Road, most of which are the original South Family structures of the Mount Lebanon Shaker Village, demonstrating "preservation through use." Many of the buildings are named for spiritual qualities that Sufis value, drawn from the 99 Names of God in Islam. Rezak was the South Family's main communal building and now contains the library and community dining room. Vakil houses the Abode Programs Office, and served as the Shaker chair-caning shop. Mughni is the former Shaker trustees building. Fatah (the 1867 Shaker women's workhouse) holds men's and women's dorms. Recently renovated, the Shaker Barn was built in 1850 as a horse barn, but now hosts offices and art studios. Abode community members renovated the Meditation Hall in 1975, and the center uses it as a sacred space for public events. Three personal retreat huts are located in the Retreat Hut Field on the hill behind the Meditation Hall, and several retreat huts and cabins are situated beside a stream south of the Shaker Barn.

=== Mountain Camp ===
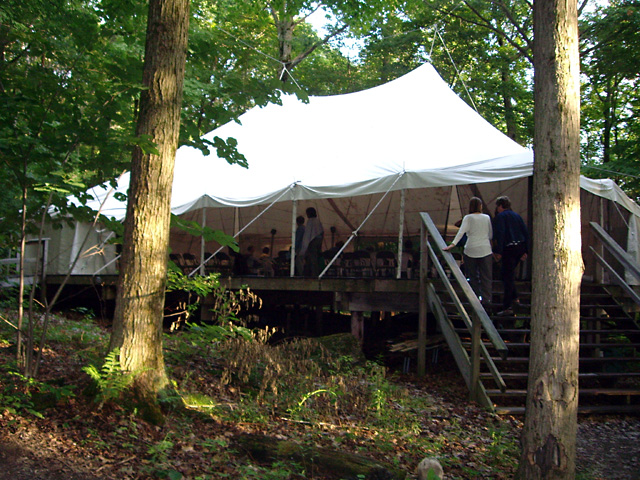
Main Tent, at the Mountain Conference Center.

The Mountain Camp hosts large group events for the Abode and The Inayati Order as well as being available as a woodland conference center. The Mountain Camp comprises dining pavilions and meeting spaces, along with shared bathroom and shower facilities for those staying on the mountain overnight. Meals are prepared in the distinctive octagonal Kitchen building. Housing on the mountain is provided by two shared cabins that hold a total of twenty two-person rooms, sixteen private huts that are simple, rustic retreat huts without electricity, and extensive space for tenting along the mountain's walking paths.
