= Saletan =

Saletan is a surname. Notable people with the surname include:

- Tony Saletan (born 1931), American folk singer and music educator
- William Saletan, American columnist
