= Albert W. Fuller =

American architect

- Born: 1854; Clinton, New York
- Died: 1934 (aged 79–80); Albany, New York
- Occupation: Architect

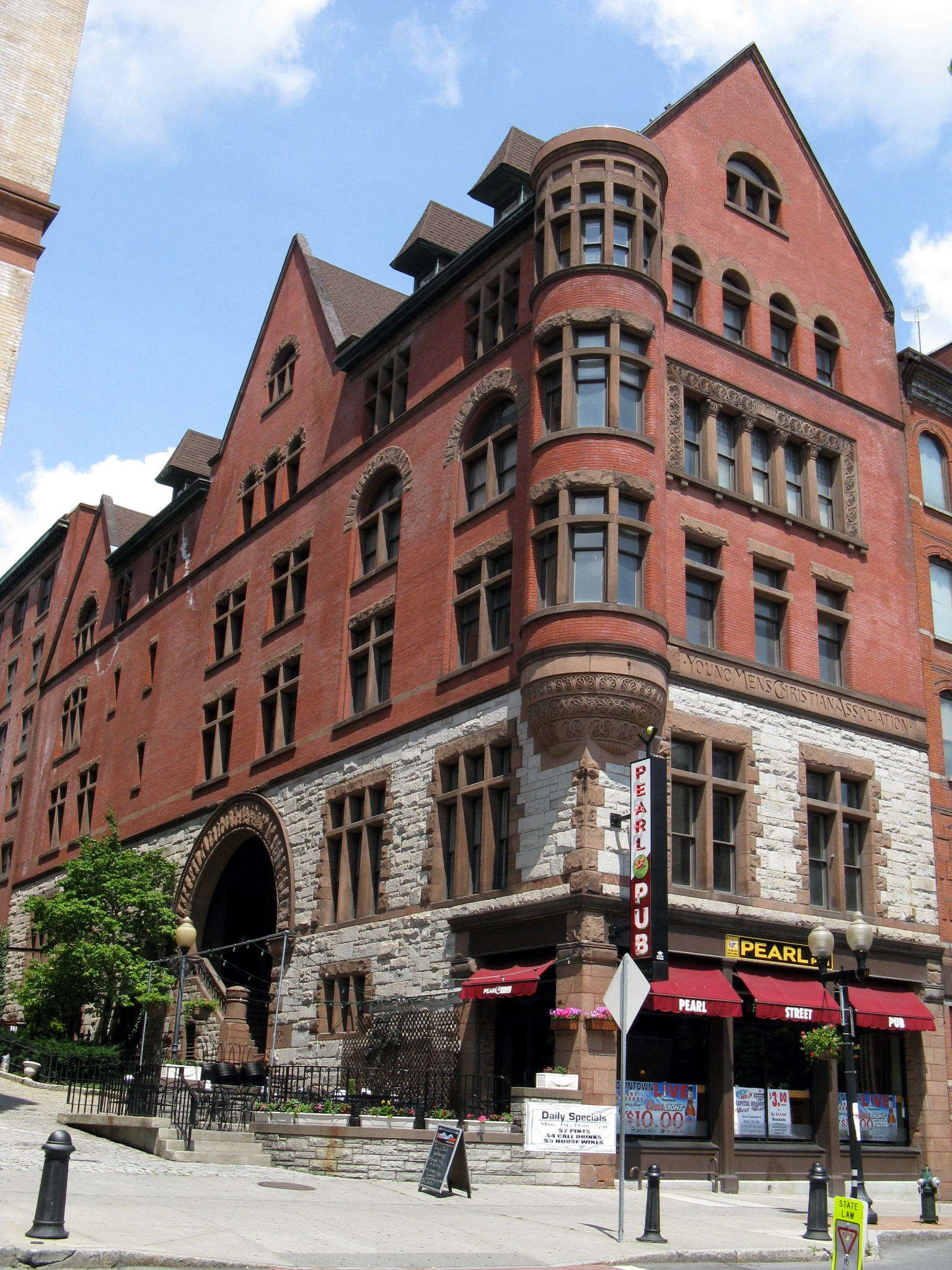
Y. M. C. A. Building, Albany, 1886

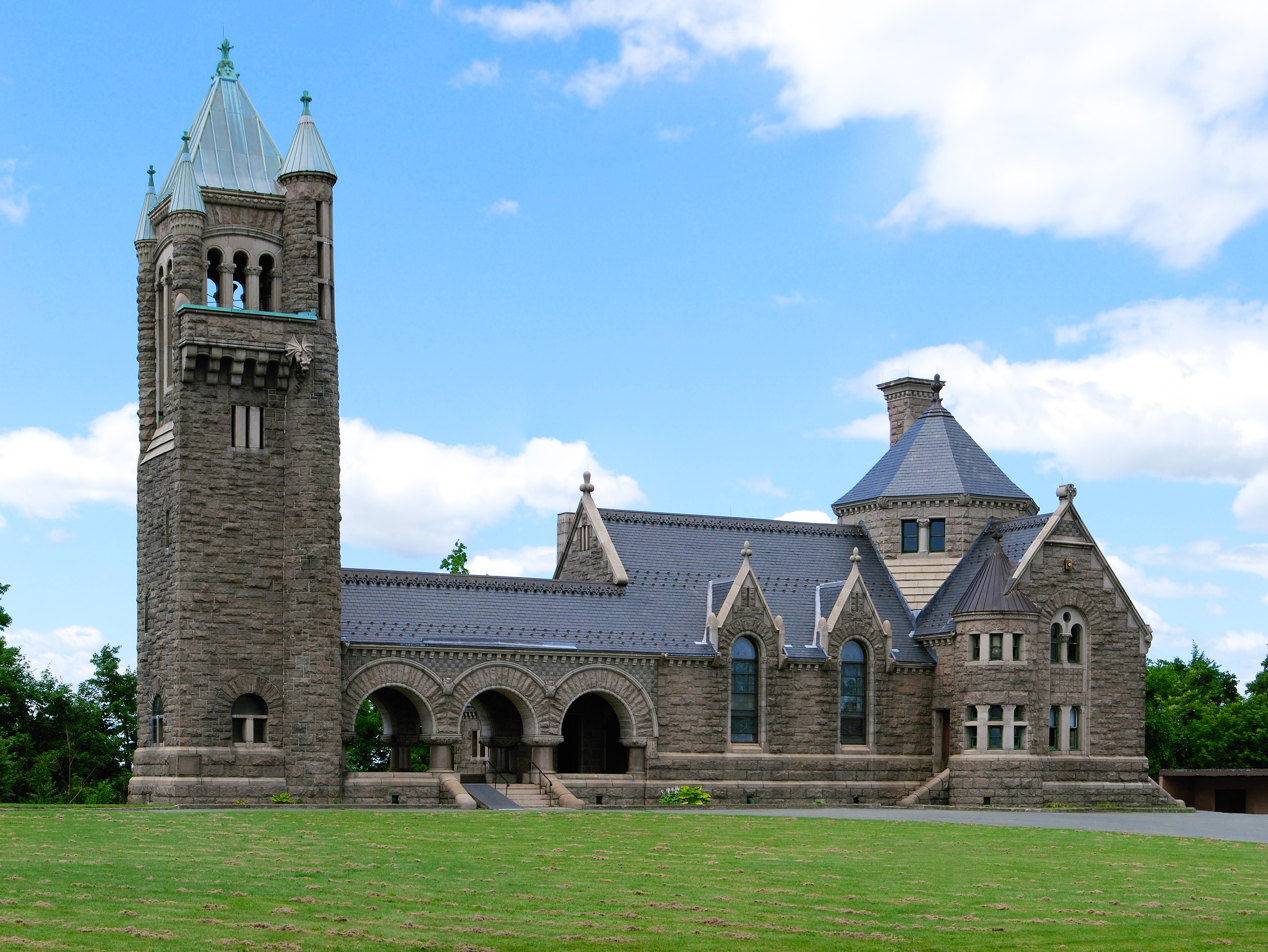
Earl Memorial Chapel and Crematorium, Oakwood Cemetery, Troy, 1888

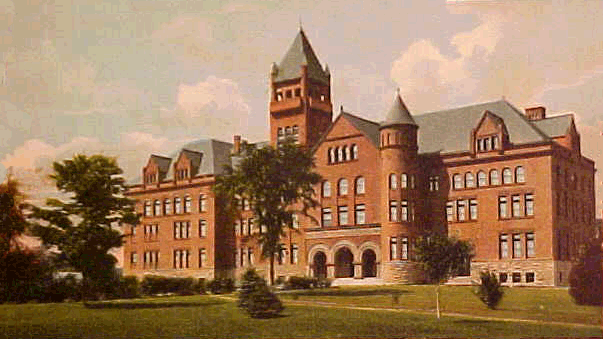
Normal School, Plattsburgh, 1889

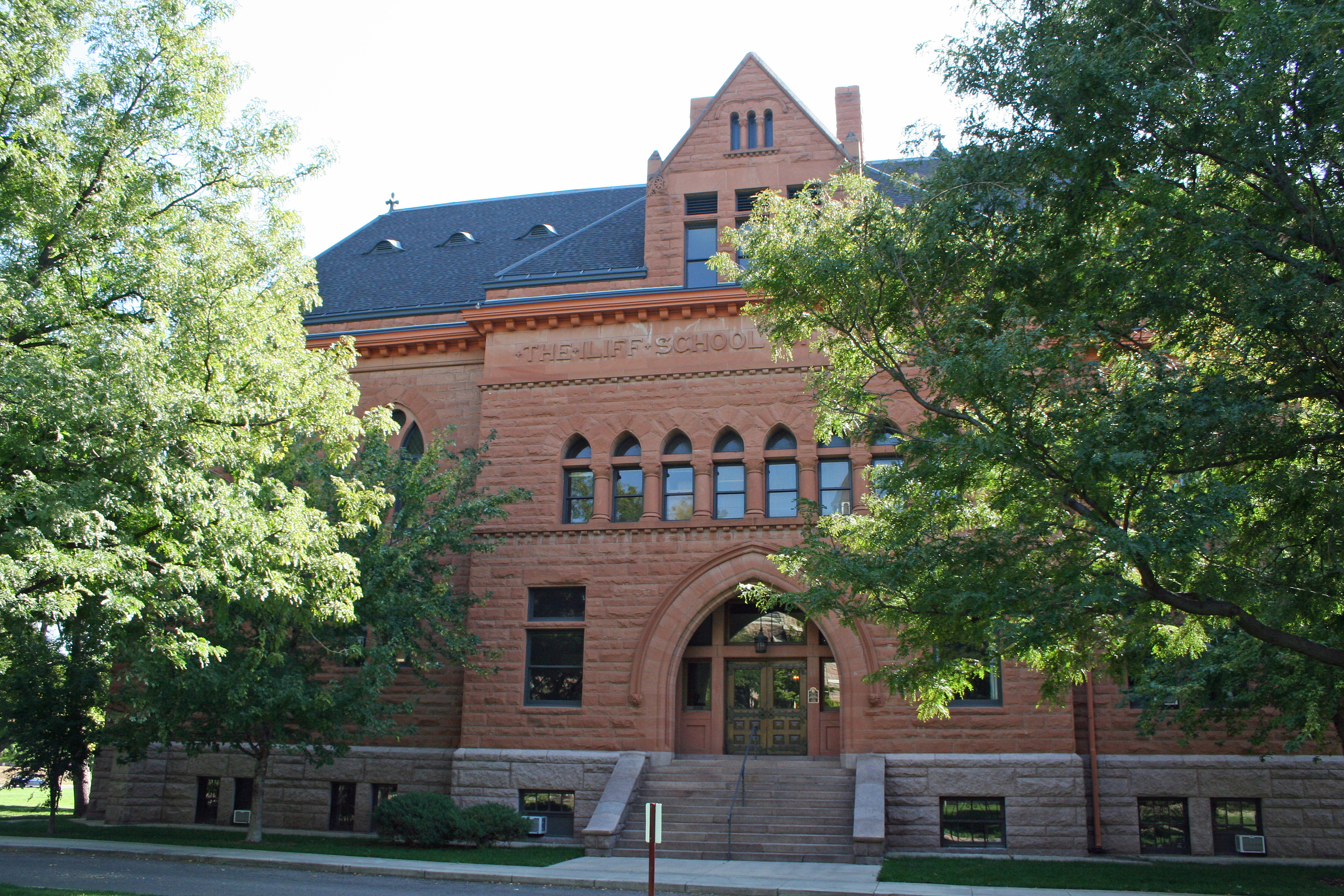
Iliff School of Theology, Denver, 1892

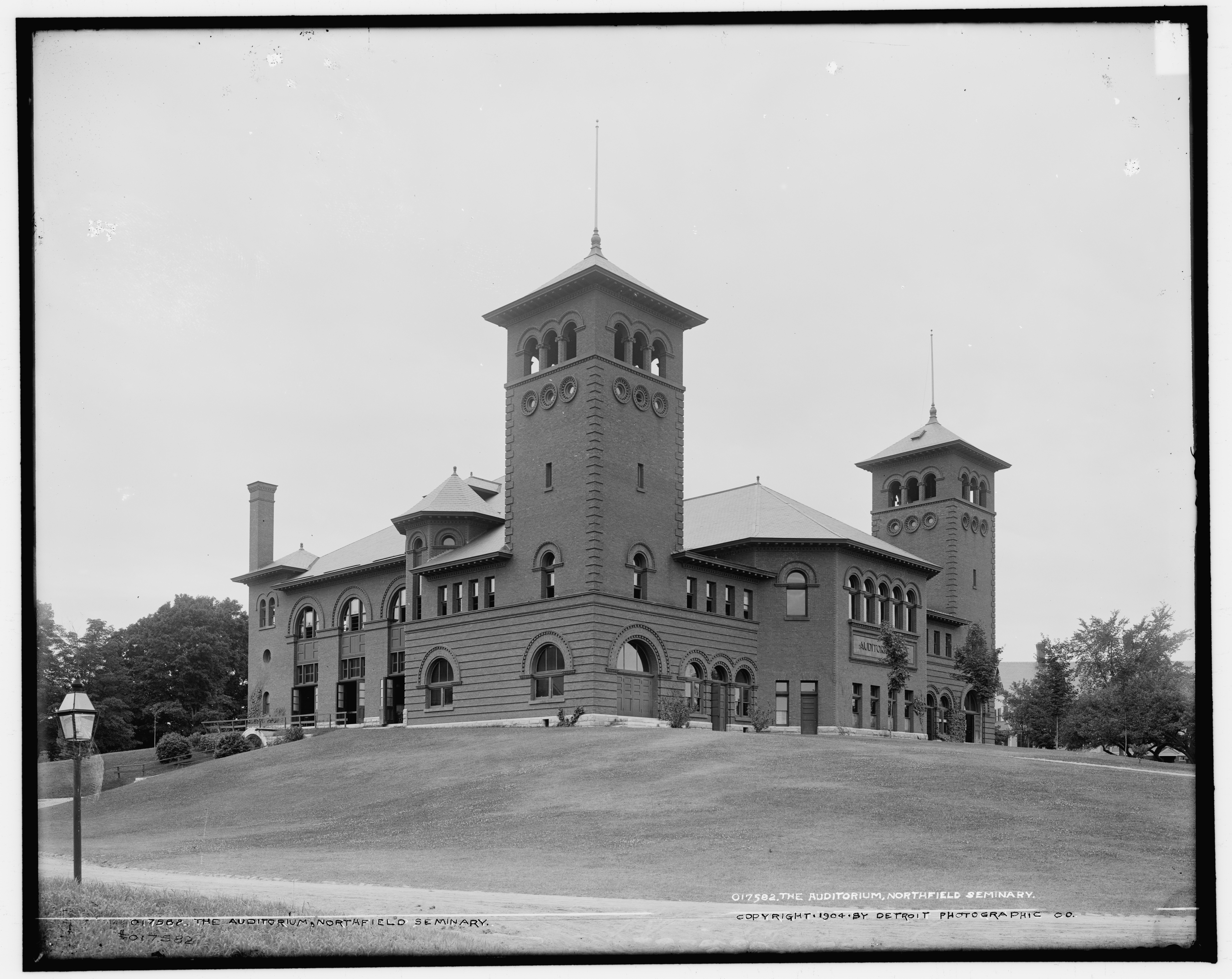
Auditorium, Northfield Seminary, 1893

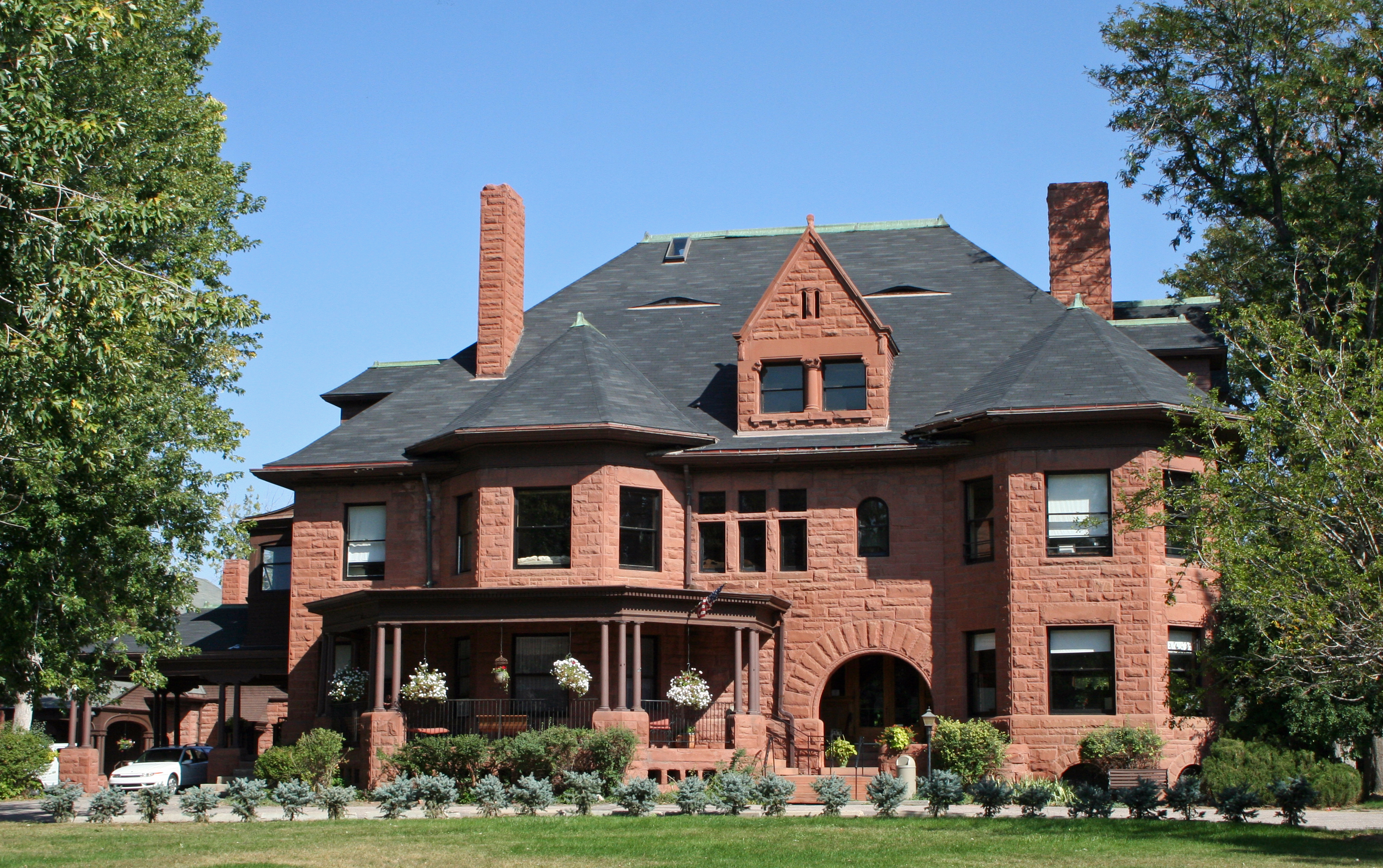
Fitzroy Place, Denver, 1893

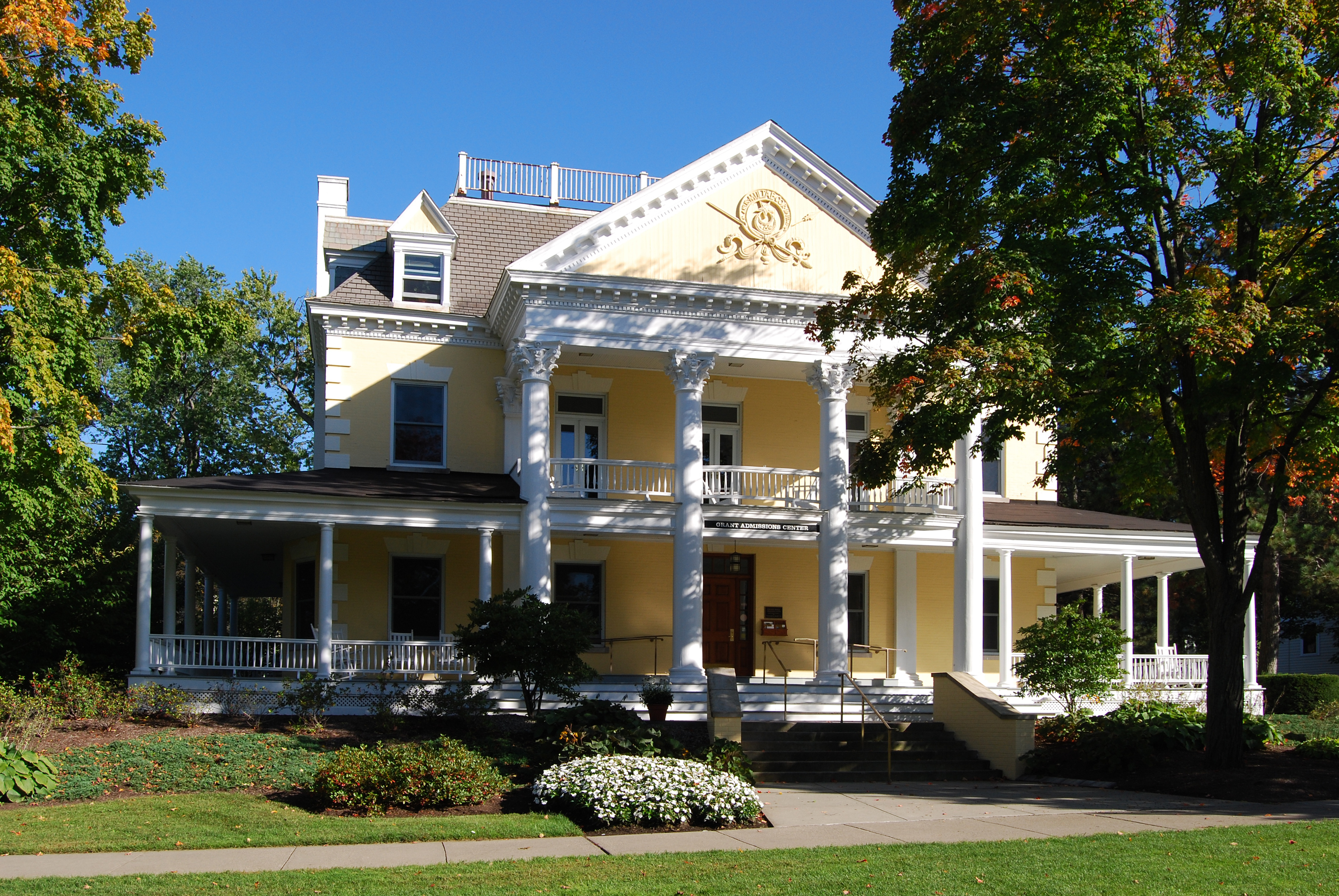
Alpha Delta Phi House, Union College, 1895

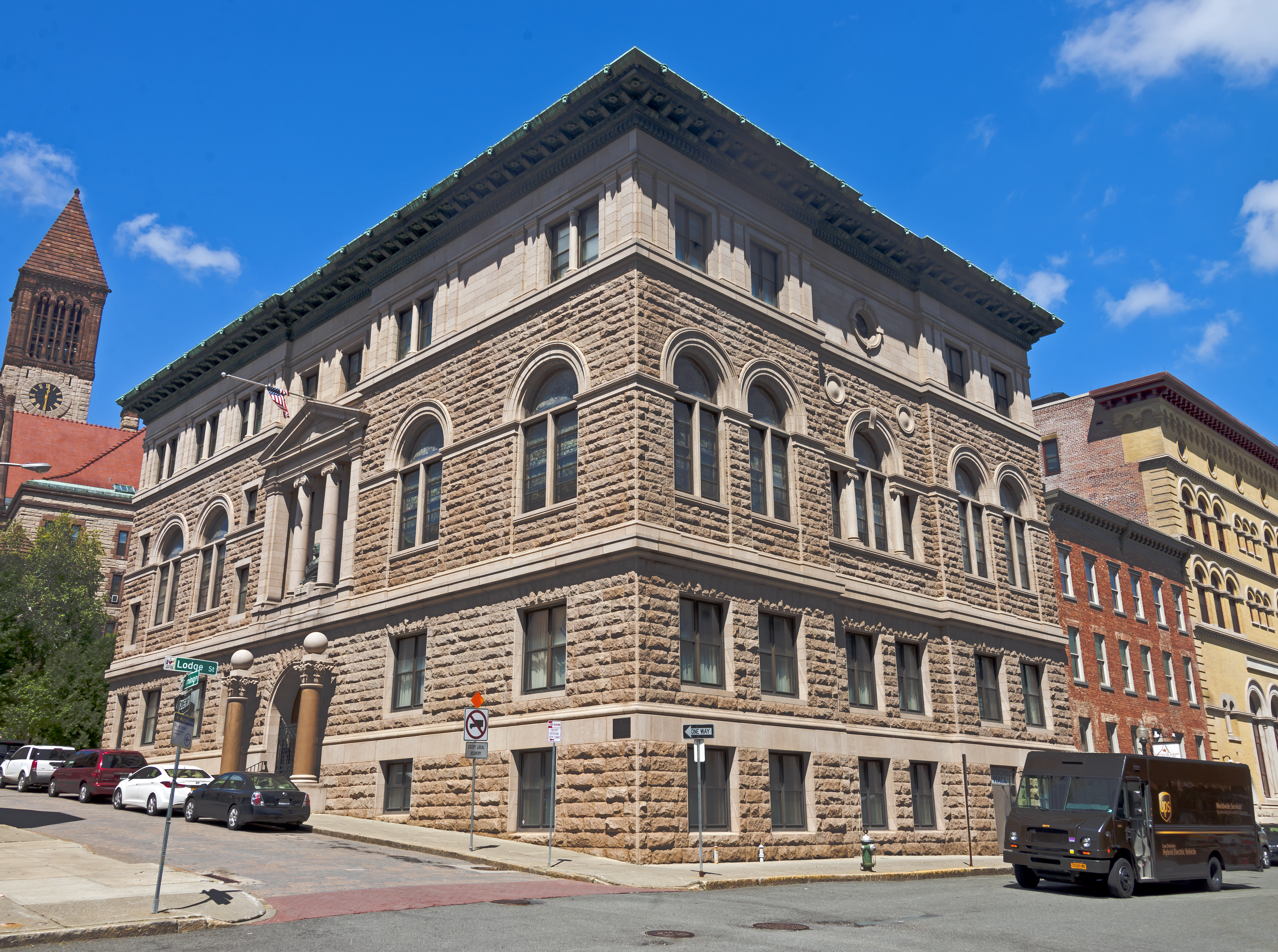
Masonic Temple, Albany, 1895

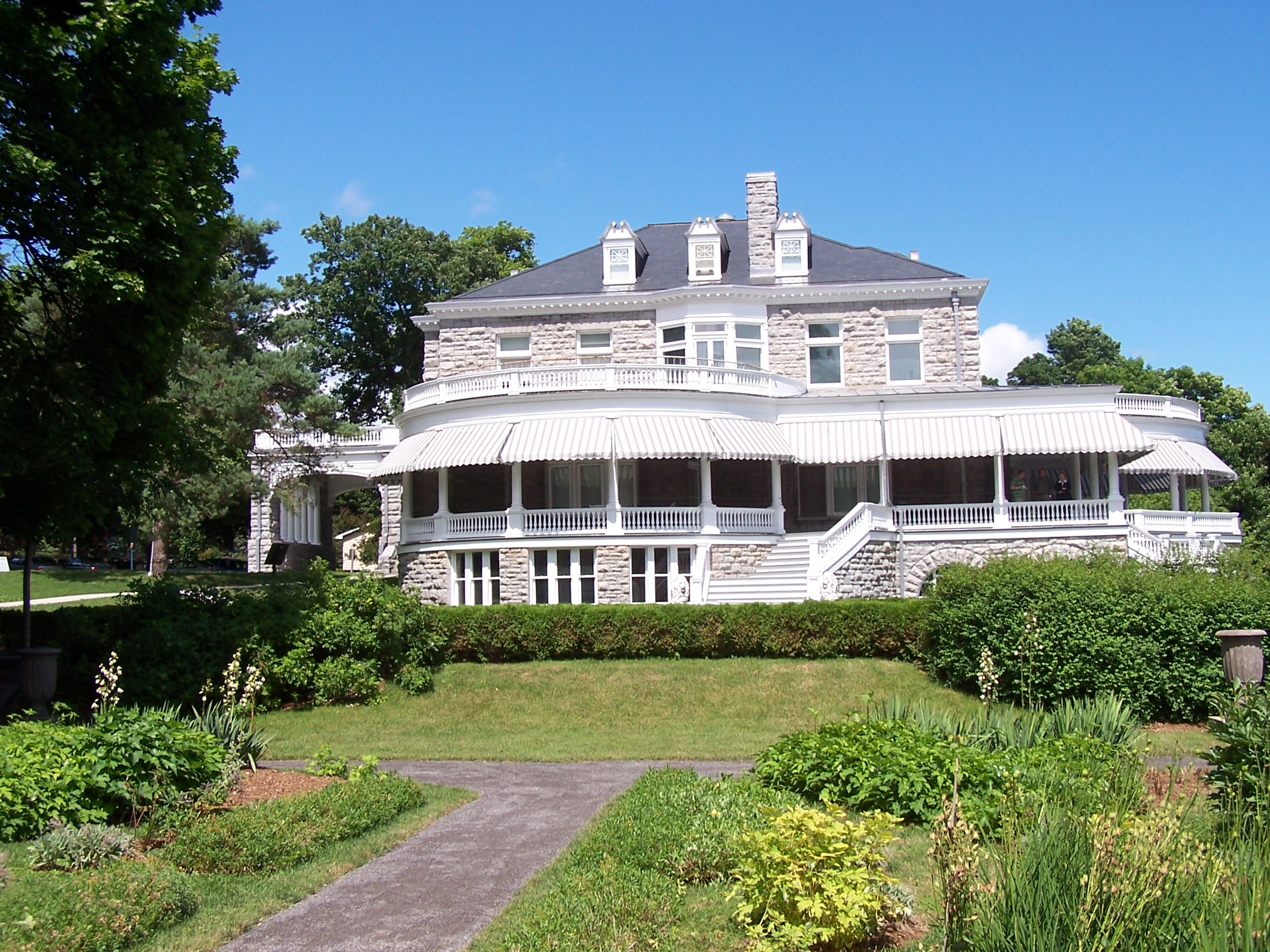
Fulford Place, Brockville, 1898

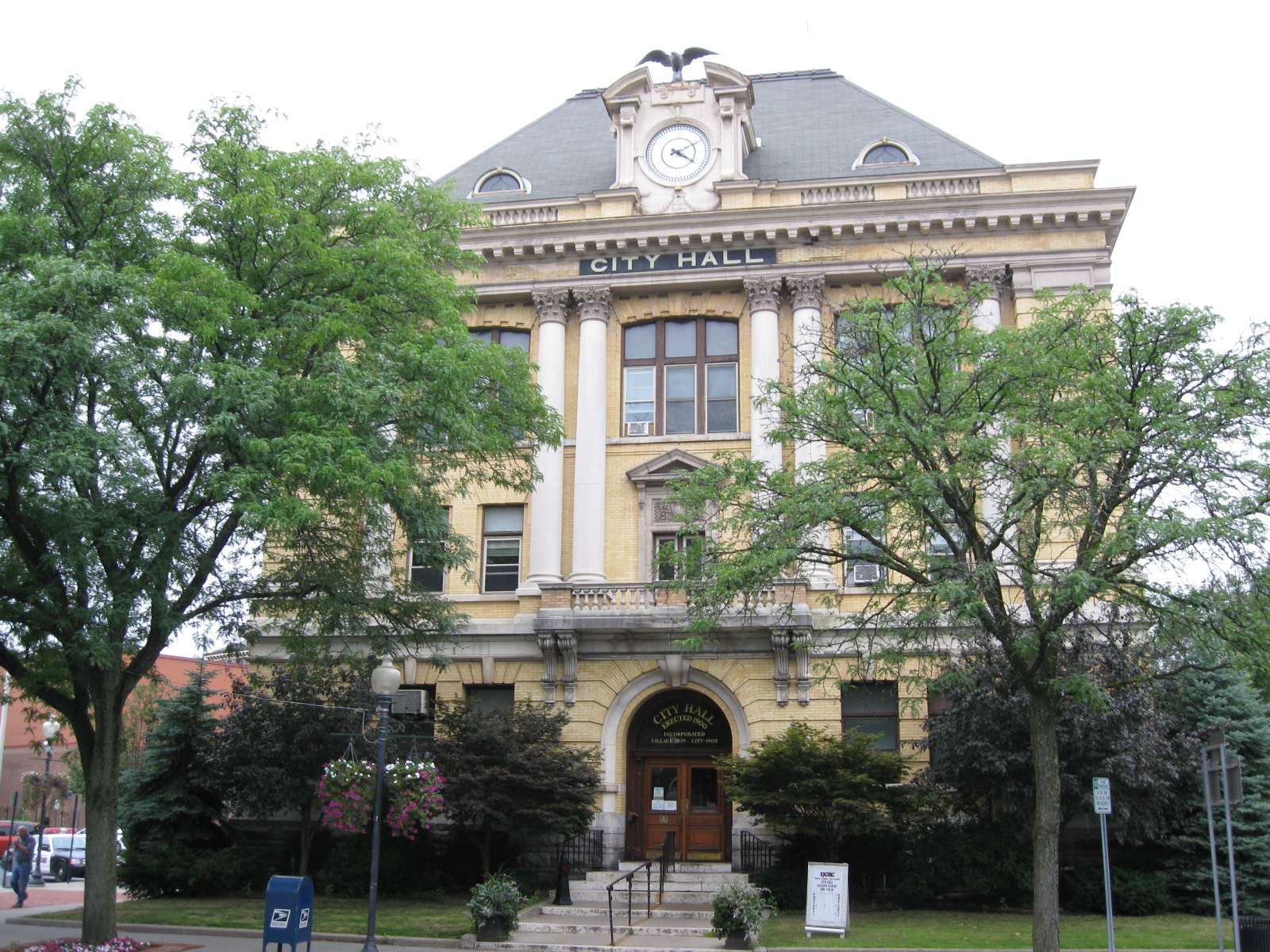
City Hall, Glens Falls, 1900

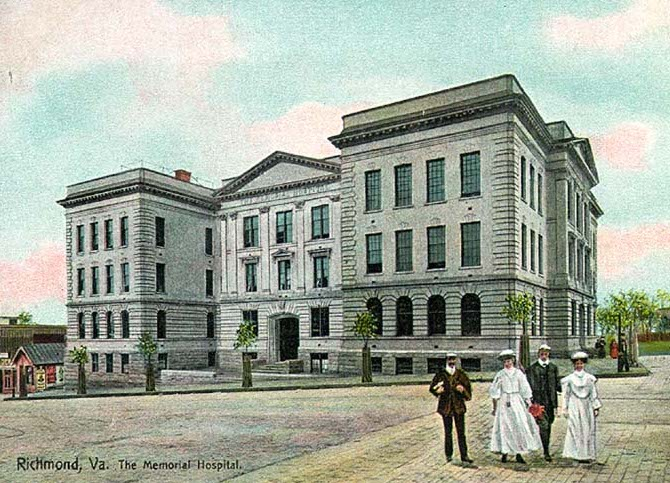
Williams Memorial Hospital, Richmond, 1901

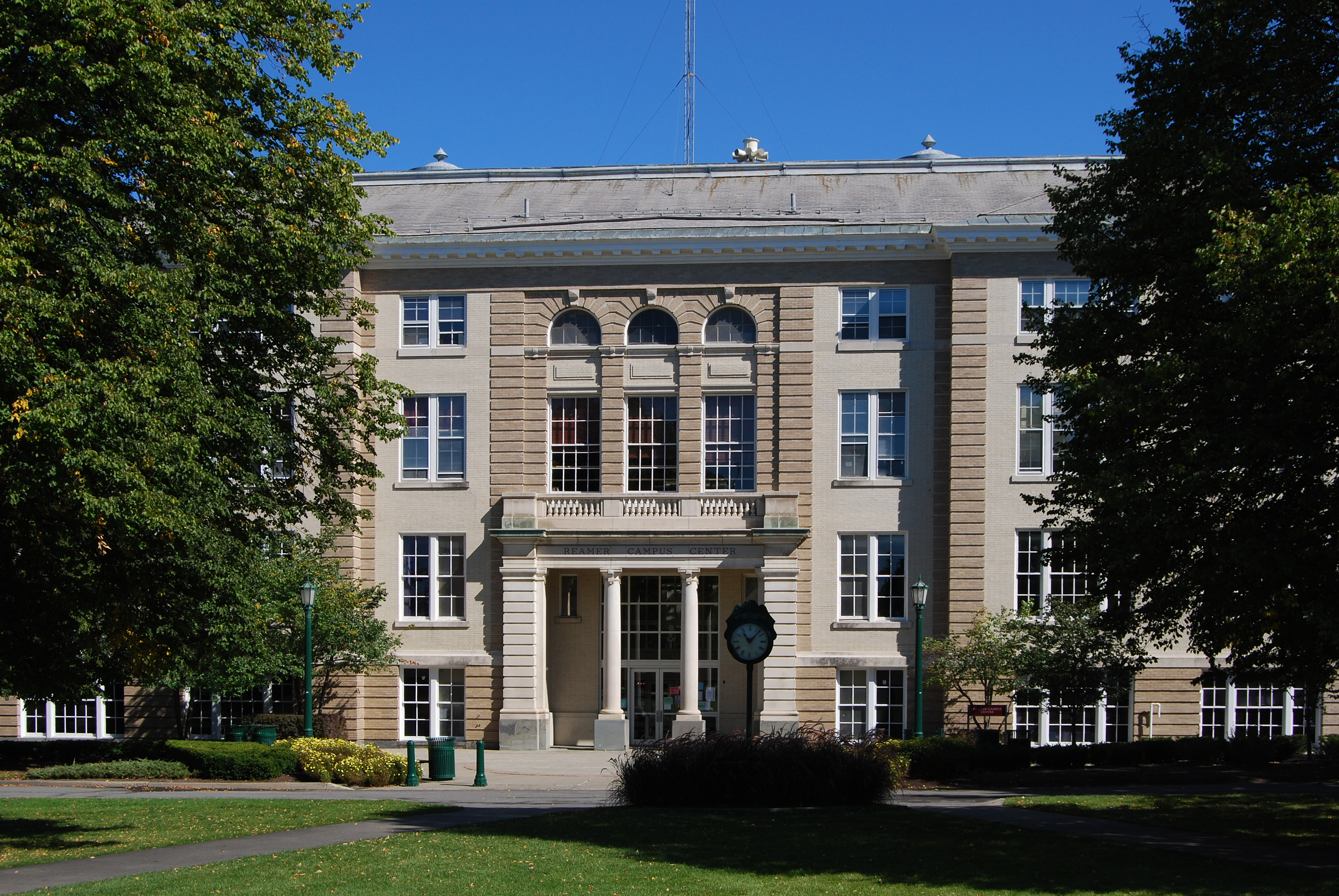
Engineering Building, Union College, 1909

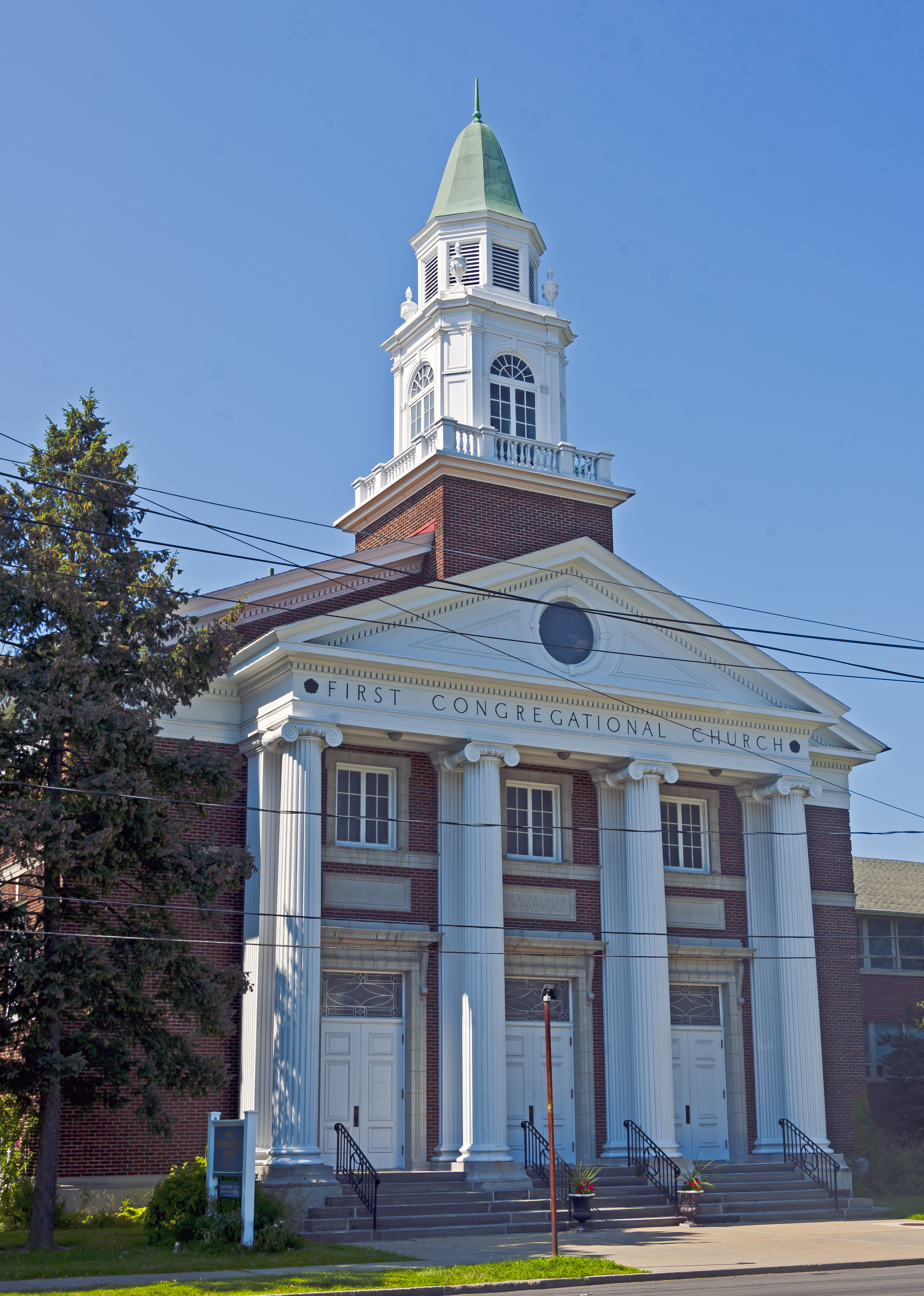
First Congregational Church, Albany, 1917

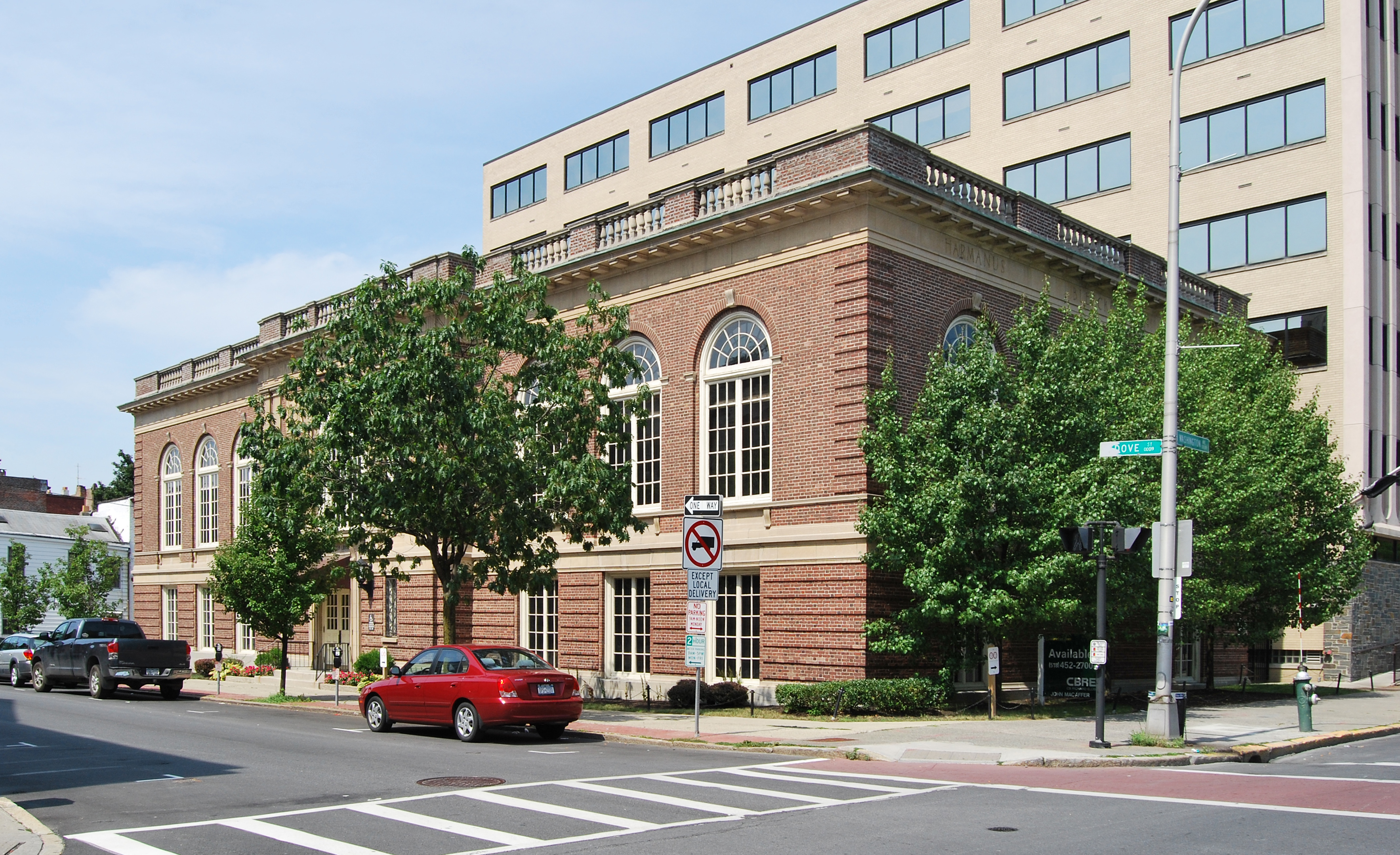
Harmanus Bleecker Library, Albany, 192

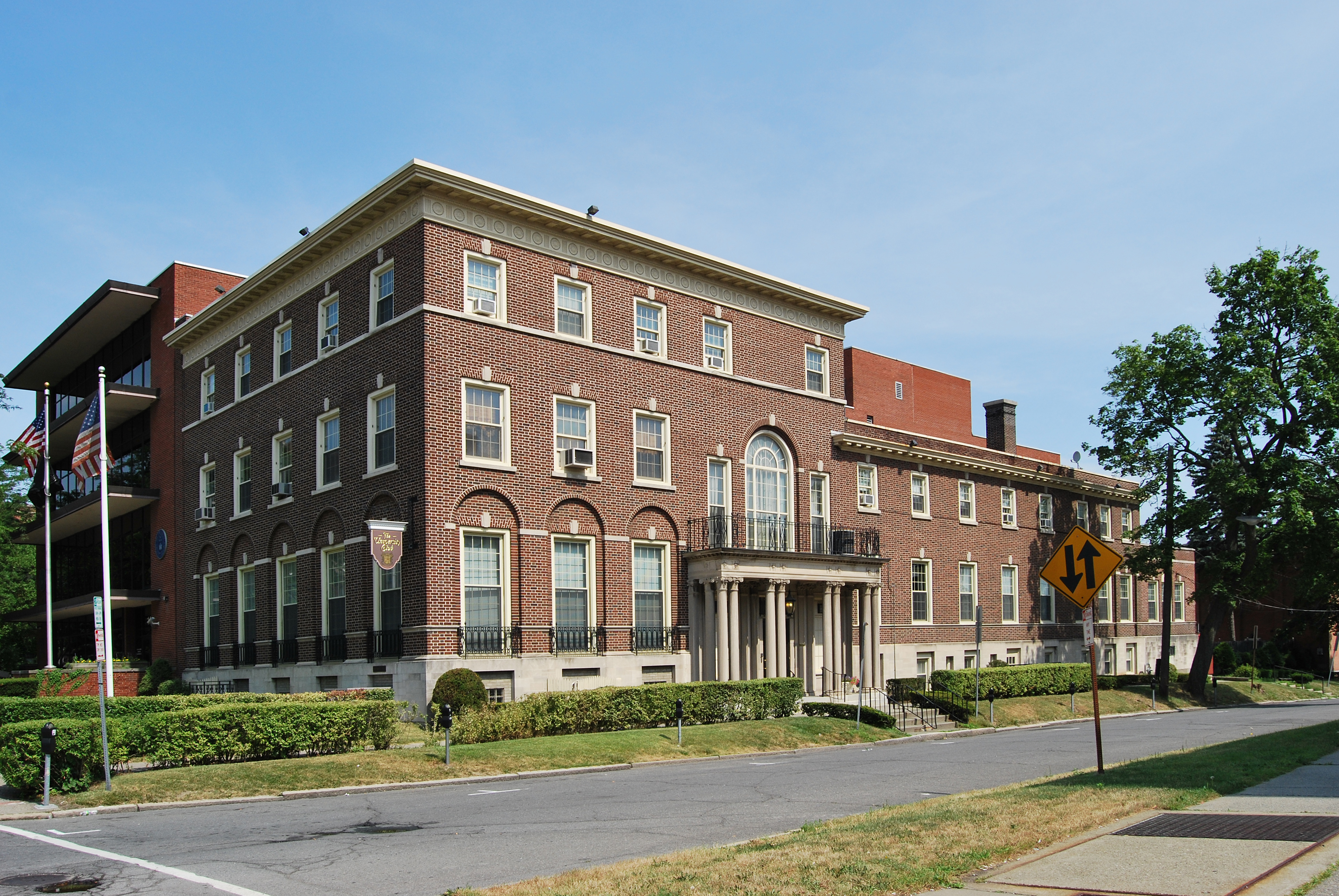
University Club, Albany, 1924

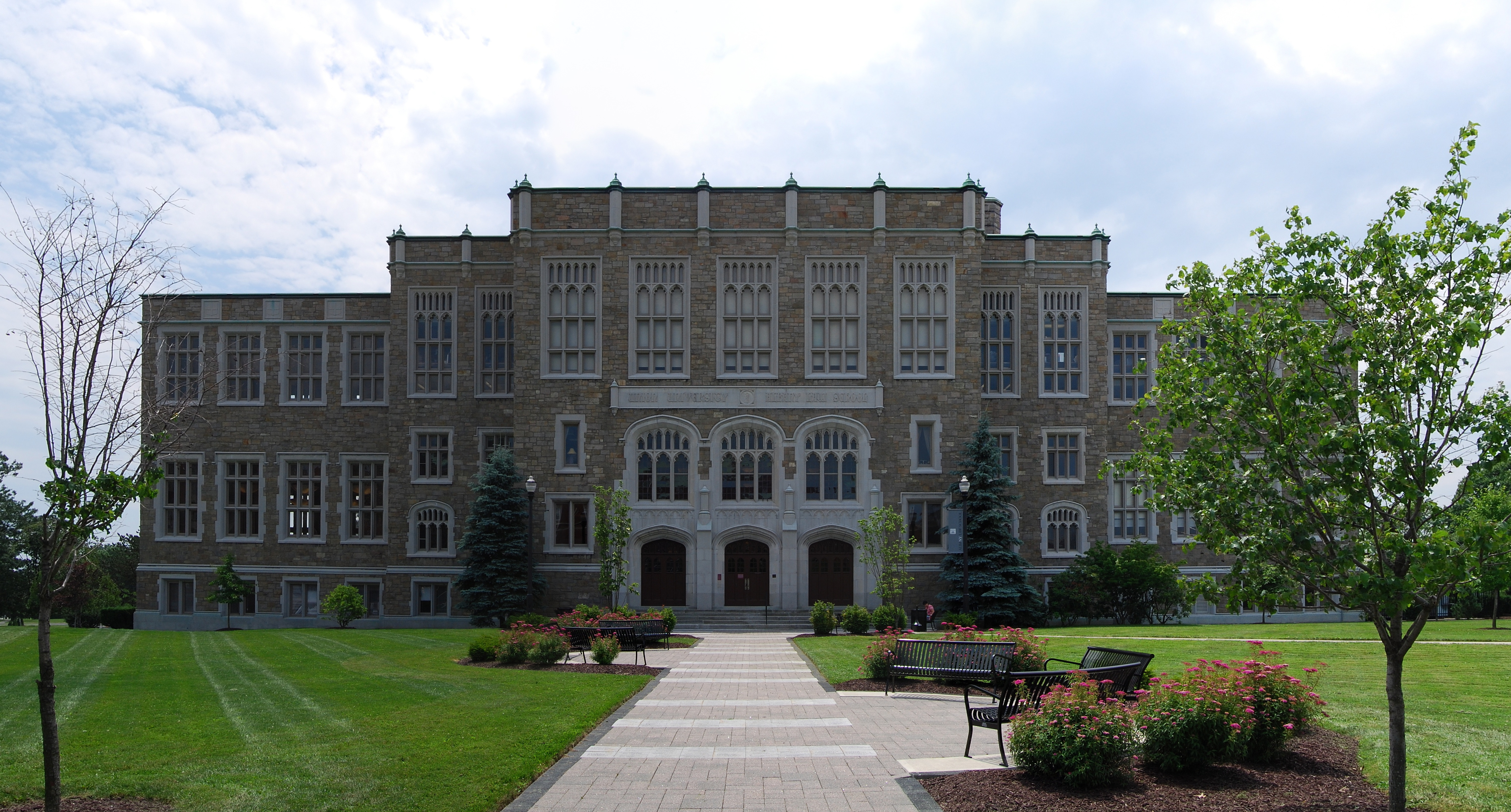
Albany Law School, Albany, 192

Albert W. Fuller (1854-1934) was an American architect practicing in Albany, New York.

== Life and career ==
Fuller was born in the town of Clinton, New York. From 1873 to 1879 he trained as a draftsman in the office of Albany architects Ogden & Wright. He then opened his own office. In 1883 he formed a partnership with William A. Wheeler, a native Albanian who had studied under Boston architects. This firm lasted until 1897. He practiced alone until 1900, when he formed a partnership with William B. Pitcher (1864–1921), a former draftsman of Fuller's. The firm was incorporated in January 1906, and Pitcher retired in 1909, due to poor health. Fuller then established a partnership with William P. Robinson.

The firm lasted until 1934, with Fuller's death. Fuller died in his office, while resting from his work. His death was attributed to heart disease.

== Architectural works ==
=== Albert W. Fuller, 1879–1883 ===
- 1881 - George W. van Slyke House, 756 Madison Avenue, Albany, New York
- 1882 - Albany County Bank Building, 6 South Pearl Street, Albany, New York
  - Demolished in 1927.
- 1882 - Charles B. Kountze House, 225 East 16th Avenue, Denver, Colorado
  - Demolished in 1963.
- 1883 - Albany Safe Deposit and Storage Building, 60 Maiden Lane, Albany, New York
  - Demolished.
- 1883 - Frederick Haslett House, 87 Main Street, Fort Plain, New York

=== Fuller & Wheeler, 1883–1897 ===
- 1885 - Edward Ellis House, 215 Union Street, Schenectady, New York
- 1885 - Horace G. Young House, 425 State Street, Albany, New York
- 1886 - Hampton B. Denman House, 1623 16th St NW, Washington, DC
- 1886 - Henry C. Pierce House, 40 Vandeventer Place St. Louis, Missouri
  - Demolished. Vendeventer Place no longer exists.
- 1886 - Delaware & Hudson Station, Bridge Street, Plattsburgh, New York
- 1886 - Y. M. C. A. Building, 62 N Pearl Street, Albany, New York
- 1887 - Academy of Music, 82 Broadway, Newburgh, New York
  - Later the Academy Theatre. Demolished.
- 1887 - Auburn High School, Genesee Street, Auburn, New York
  - Demolished.
- 1887 - Zenas Crane House (Willow Brook), 30 Main Street, Dalton, Massachusetts
  - Demolished.
- 1887 - Hoosick Falls M. E. Church, 130 Main Street, Hoosick Falls, New York
- 1888 - Louis D. Collins House (Belhurst), 4069 Route 14, Geneva, New York
- 1888 - Earl Memorial Chapel and Crematorium, Oakwood Cemetery, Troy, New York
- 1888 - Harmanus Bleecker Hall, 161 Washington Avenue, Albany, New York
  - Burned in 1940.
- 1888 - Delaware & Hudson Station, 20 Park Place Port Henry, New York
- 1889 - Edward McKinney House, 391 State Street, Albany, New York
- 1889 - Normal Hall, Plattsburgh Normal School, Plattsburgh, New York
  - Burned in 1929.
- 1889 - Silliman (Couper) Hall, Hamilton College, Clinton, New York
- 1889 - Y. M. C. A Building, 1155 Rue Metcalfe, Montreal, Quebec
  - Demolished.
- 1889 - Y. M. C. A. Building, Main and Court Streets, New Britain, Connecticut
  - Demolished.
- 1890- Andrew S. Baker House, 129 South Lake Avenue, Albany, New York
- 1890 - Public School No. 10, 250 Central Avenue, Albany, New York
- 1890 - Soldiers and Sailors Monument, Monument Square, Troy, New York
- 1891 - 4th Precinct Police Station, 419 Madison Avenue, Albany, New York
- 1891 - Alden Chester House, 139 South Lake Avenue, Albany, New York
- 1891 - Hudson River Telephone Building, Maiden Lane and Chapel Street, Albany, New York
  - Demolished.
- 1892 - Iliff Hall, Iliff School of Theology, Denver, Colorado
- 1892 - Montgomery County Courthouse, 58 Broadway, Fonda, New York
- 1893 - Auditorium, Northfield Seminary, Northfield, Massachusetts
- 1893 - Convention Hall, 268 Broadway, Saratoga Springs, New York
  - Demolished.
- 1893 - Henry W. Warren House (Fitzroy Place), 2160 South Cook Street, Denver, Colorado
- 1893 - Public School No. 6, 105 2nd Street, Albany, New York
  - Demolished.
- 1893 - Public School No. 24, Delaware and Madison Avenues, Albany, New York
  - Demolished.
- 1894 - DeGraaf Building, 23 S Pearl Street, Albany, New York
  - Demolished.
- 1894 - Forest Presbyterian Church, 4019 Center Street, Lyons Falls, New York
- 1894 - Normal Hall, Oneonta Normal School, Oneonta, New York
  - Demolished in 1977.
- 1895 - Alpha Delta Phi Fraternity House, Union College, Schenectady, New York
  - Now the college's Grant Hall.
- 1895 - Masonic Temple, 67 Corning Place, Albany, New York
- 1895 - Rectory for St. Peter's Episcopal Church, 107 State Street, Albany, New York
- 1895 - Silliman Memorial Presbyterian Church, Mohawk and Seneca Streets, Cohoes, New York
  - Demolished in 1998.
- 1896 - Home Savings Bank Building, 13 North Pearl Street, Albany, New York
  - Demolished.
- 1897 - Albany Hospital, 47 New Scotland Avenue, Albany, New York
  - Demolished.

=== Albert W. Fuller, 1897–1900 ===
- 1897 - Moody Memorial Chapel, Mount Hermon School, Gill, Massachusetts
- 1898 - Centennial Hall, 7 Pine Street, Albany, New York
  - The former school and convent of St. Mary's R. C. Church.
- 1898 - George T. Fulford House (Fulford Place), 287 King Street East, Brockville, Ontario
- 1898 - Lackawanna Trust and Safe Deposit Building, 506 Spruce Street, Scranton, Pennsylvania
  - Demolished.
- 1898 - Watervliet High School, 1408-1412 4th Avenue, Watervliet, New York
  - Demolished.
- 1899 - Mechanicville M. E. Church, 7 North Main Street, Mechanicville, New York
- 1899 - Union Free School, 7 Stewart Farrar Avenue, Warrensburg, New York
  - Demolished.
- 1900 - Richards Library, 36 Elm Street, Warrensburg, New York

=== Fuller & Pitcher, 1900–1905 ===
- 1900 - Glens Falls City Hall, 42 Ridge Street, Glens Falls, New York
- 1900 - Public Bath No. 1, 665 Broadway, Albany, New York
  - Demolished.
- 1901 - Charles Gibson and William J. Walker Houses, 415-417 State Street, Albany, New York
- 1901 - Charlotte Williams Memorial Hospital, 1201 East Broad Street, Richmond, Virginia
- 1901 - James McCredie House, 403 State Street, Albany, New York
- 1901 - Public School No. 12, 27 Western Avenue, Albany, New York
- 1901 - Trinity Episcopal Church, 1336 1st Avenue, Watervliet, New York
- 1902 - Amsterdam Free Library, 28 Church Street, Amsterdam, New York
- 1902 - Gordius H. P. Gould House, Main Street, Lyons Falls, New York
- 1902 - Guy Park Avenue School, 300 Guy Park Avenue, Amsterdam, New York
- 1902 - Johnstown Public Library, 38 South Market Street, Johnstown, New York
- 1903 - Hackley Hospital, 1700 Clinton Street, Muskegon, Michigan
  - Demolished.
- 1904 - Ellis Hospital, 1101 Nott Street, Schenectady, New York
- 1904 - Y. M. C. A. Building (former), 2101 Telegraph Avenue, Oakland, California
- 1905 - Wellington Hotel, 136 State Street, Albany, New York

=== Fuller & Pitcher Company, 1906–1909 ===
- 1906 - Albany Institute and Historical Art Society, 125 Washington Avenue, Albany, New York
- 1906 - Manufacturers Bank Building, 91 Remsen Street, Cohoes, New York
- 1907 - Masonic Hall, 2 Russell Avenue, Ravena, New York
- 1909 - Engineering Building (Reamer Campus Center), Union College, Schenectady, New York
- 1909 - Johnstown High School, West Montgomery & South Market Streets, Johnstown, New York
  - Demolished.

=== Fuller & Robinson Company, 1909–1934 ===
- 1910 - Watervliet High School, 14th Street, Watervliet, New York
  - now the Watervliet Civic Center.
- 1912 - Berkshire Hotel, 140 State Street, Albany, New York
- 1912 - Herkimer High School, 435 North Bellinger Street, Herkimer, New York
- 1913 - Ilion High School, Weber Avenue, Ilion, New York
  - Burned in 1963.
- 1913 - Union Free School, Cemetery Road, New Lebanon, New York
  - Demolished in 2012.
- 1913 - Masonic Temple, 48 Grand Street, Newburgh, New York
- 1915 - Kinney & Woodward Building, 74 State Street, Albany, New York
- 1916 - Fair Haven Grade School, 115 N Main Street, Fair Haven, Vermont
- 1917 - First Congregational Church, 405 Quail Street, Albany, New York
- 1917 - Public School No. 19, 395 New Scotland Avenue, Albany, New York
- 1921 - Bay Shore High School, 155 3rd Avenue, Bay Shore, New York
- 1922 - North School, 217 North Washington Street, Herkimer, New York
- 1923 - Albany Hardware and Iron Building, 139 Broadway, Albany, New York
- 1923 - Harmanus Bleecker Library, 19 Dove Street, Albany, New York
- 1924 - University Club, 141 Washington Avenue, Albany, New York
- 1925 - Gates B. Aufsessor House, 570 Providence Street, Albany, New York
- 1927 - Walter A. Wood High School, Eberle Way, Hoosick Falls, New York
  - Demolished in 1968.
- 1928 - Albany Law School, 80 New Scotland Avenue, Albany, New York
- 1929 - Franklin Academy (former), 15 Francis Street, Malone, New York
  - Now the Malone Middle School.
- 1931 - Bethlehem Central High School, 332 Kenwood Avenue, Delmar, New York

== Published works ==
- Artistic Homes in City and Country, 1882. Reissued five times between 1882 and 1891.
