= YMCA Building (Albany, New York) =

- U.S. National Register of Historic Places
- U.S. Historic district – Contributing property
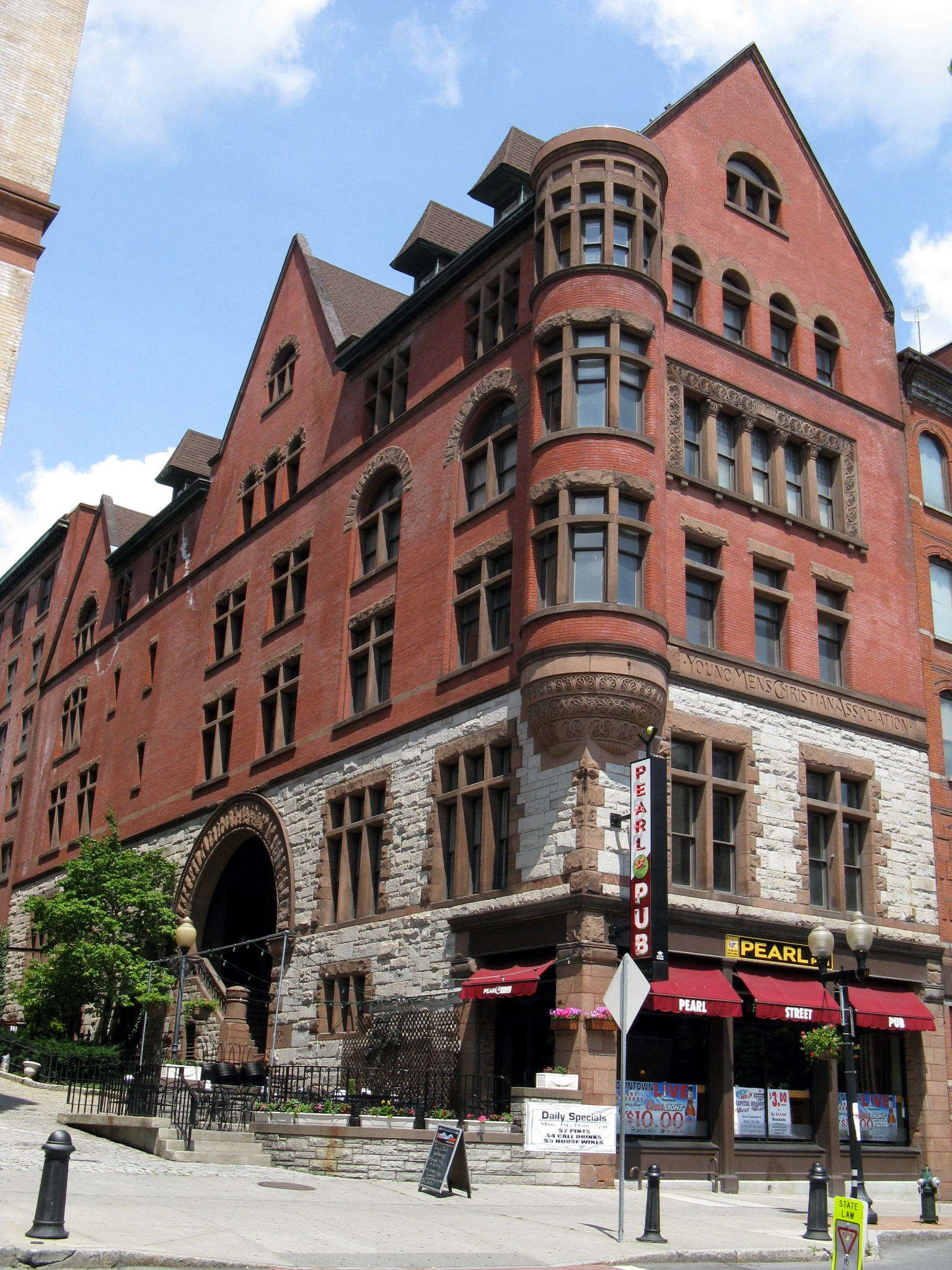
- South profile and east elevation, 2010

- Location within New York Location within the United States
- Interactive map showing the YMCA building in Albany
- Location: 60-64 North Pearl Street, Albany, New York
- Coordinates: 42°39′6″N 73°45′5″W
- Area: less than one acre
- Built: 1886
- Architect: Fuller & Wheeler
- Architectural style: Romanesque, Richardsonian Romanesque
- Part of: Downtown Albany Historic District
- NRHP reference No.: 78001838
- Added to NRHP: November 2, 1978

The former Young Men's Christian Association Building in Albany, New York, United States, is located on Pearl Street (New York State Route 32). It was built in the 1880s in the Romanesque Revival architectural style, with an existing neighboring structure annexed to it and a rear addition built in the 1920s. It was listed on the National Register of Historic Places in 1978. Two years later, when the Downtown Albany Historic District was designated and listed on the Register, YMCA building was further included as a contributing property.

At the time of its construction, it had the first gymnasium in upstate New York, and one of the earliest indoor swimming pools in the country. Several years later, it hosted the first basketball game played away from Springfield College, where the sport was invented.

== Building ==
The building is located at the northwest corner of the Steuben Street intersection. The surrounding neighborhood is densely developed with tall brick commercial buildings of a similar vintage and scale such as the Kenmore Hotel. The ground slopes upward to the west, away from the nearby Hudson River, exposing the lowest story as the ground level along Pearl Street.

That ground level is part of a two-story foundation of rough-cut masonry with brownstone trim. The three stories above are faced in brick, also with brownstone. A flat-roofed round turret begins at the second story on the southeast corner. At the top is a steeply pitched gabled slate roof with three projecting gables and several small dormer windows.

At street level is the glass front of the Pearl Street Pub, a bar, wrapping around to the east end of the south facade. To its west is a small recessed rectangular triple window and then the main entryway, a two-story segmented archway with foliated decoration and a balustraded stone stairway recessed deeply inside. A large datestone is to the east of the archway. Beyond it to the west is an oriel window. On the second story are rectangular one-over-one double-hung sash windows with transoms above set in a pair of doubles on the east and two groups of three on either side of the entryway rising from a brownstone belt course at sill level.

Foliation similar to the archway also girdles the lower section of the turret, which begins to rise in brownstone below the cornice that divides brick and stone. Above it on the east facade is a plain brownstone frieze with "Young Men's Christian Association" carved into it. The third floor has three individual one-over-one rectangular windows on the east, a triple window on the turret, two double windows in slightly recessed round-arched bays on the south face, their sills part of another belt course, and then two unrecessed double windows. The east end has one narrow window and then two more double windows.

The fourth floor's east facade has a recessed quintuple window with stone mullions and foliate carvings, followed by another triple window on the turret. The two windows at the top of the recessed bays have stone segmental arches. The next two windows are similar to those below them except not as tall. Two narrow windows separate them from a triple window with semicircular arch at the west end.

A molded stone cornice sets off the uppermost story. It serves as the sill of four deeply recessed windows above it on the east facade. A common lintel is the springline for their segmented-arch tops. The top of the turret has seven narrow windows with transoms and panels atop, with a metal-trimmed cornice at its roofline. On the south the cornice continues, serving as the sill for two groups of three deeply recessed windows. Below the gable are three windows with the same treatment as those on the east, save for rough-cut stone in their arches. Between it and the similarly treated west gable are a triple and double similar to the ones at the east corner. The lower west gable's window uses the cornice as its sill.

The attic level of the east gable and the central gable on the south have a small triple window with smooth-faced stone segmental arch and transom. The roof is marked by a wide overhanging eave and cornice between the gables and a thin cornice of metal-trimmed stone on them. The two dormers piercing the roof on either side of the central gable have hipped roofs.

To the north, the building at 64 Pearl was annexed to YMCA. It had been expanded for commercial use from an earlier structure six years earlier. Its five stories are faced in gauged decorative brickwork with segmental-arched keystoned window surrounds of rough-cut stone. The flat roof has a bracketed cornice trimmed in stamped metal. To the west of the main block is a six-story addition with an entrance at the northwest corner. It and the double windows are trimmed in rough-cut stone, and its flat roof has a metal cornice.

Inside there have been many alterations and modifications over the years, as well as fire and water damage, and much original finish has been lost, particularly in the annexed building at 64 Pearl. The main block has its original south stairwell and first-floor door and window surrounds, and a main parlor fireplace with a large ogee-shaped mantel. The basement swimming pool has its original arcade, and the original gymnasium occupies most of the lower floors. On the upper floors are many original dormitory rooms.

== History ==
In 1857, six years after the national YMCA's founding, a local organization was established in Albany. It used other properties for its programming until James Jermain donated $50,000 ($1.79 million in modern dollars) to go toward the construction of a new building. After a matching amount was raised through subscriptions from the public, the lot and neighboring building were purchased.

Local architects Fuller & Wheeler collaborated on a Romanesque Revival design that has been seen as exemplifying that style as applied to a densely developed urban site. When finished in 1886, it had one of the first indoor swimming pools in the country and the first gymnasium in upstate New York. Two years later, it was formally dedicated and began growing into a major civic organization. In 1892, it was home to an important event in the history of basketball: the sport's first game played away from Springfield College in Massachusetts, where it had been invented in 1890 by James Naismith.

== See also ==
- National Register of Historic Places listings in Albany, New York
