= Albany Masonic Temple =

Coordinates: 42.6513°N 73.7538°W

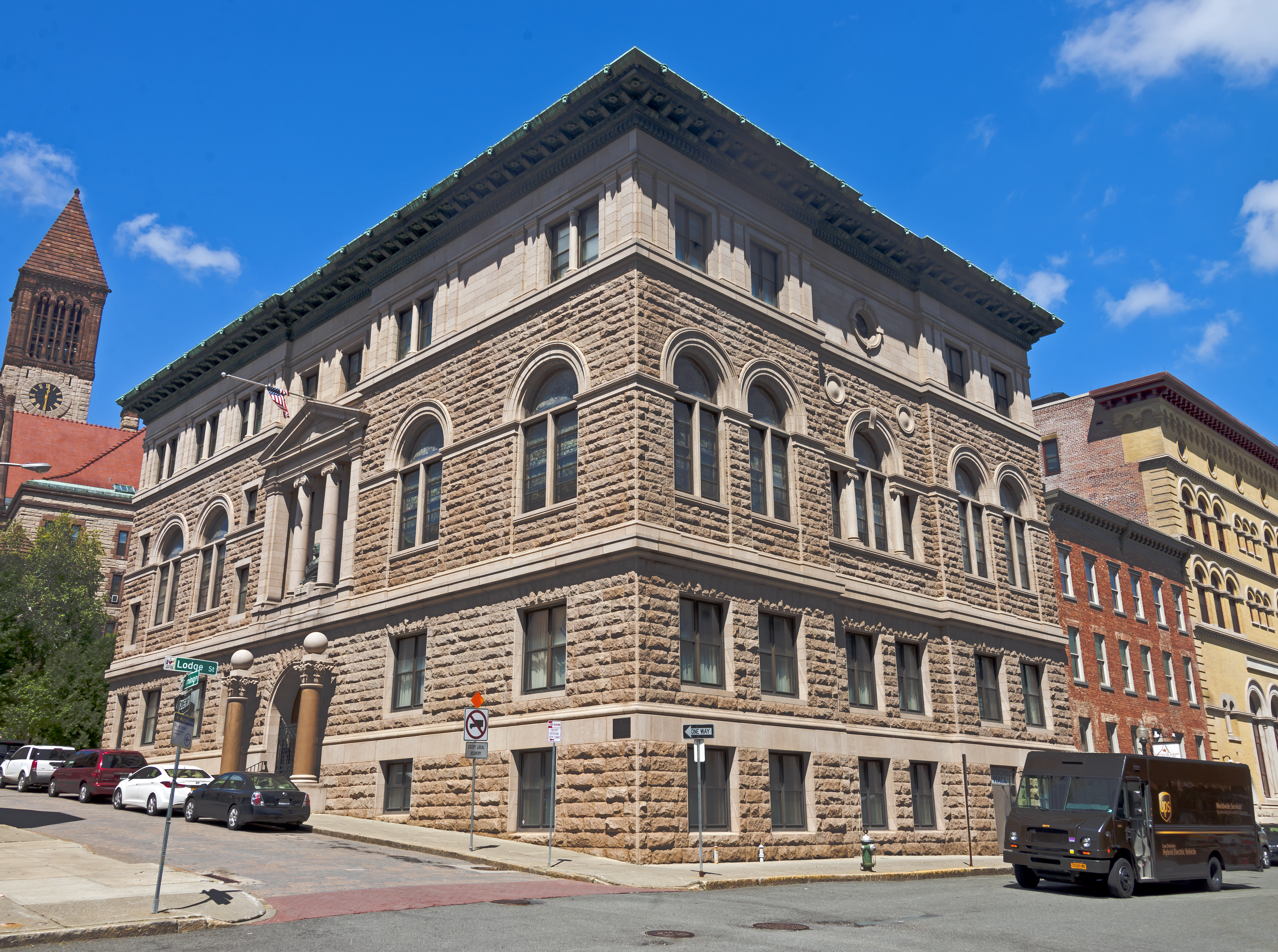
The Albany Masonic Temple

The Albany Masonic Temple in Albany, New York sits on the oldest property continuously owned by Masonry in the United States and the building that it replaced on the same property was the first Masonic Temple to be built for that sole purpose. It is a contributing property to the Downtown Albany Historic District, listed on the National Register of Historic Places in 1980. It is located at 67 Corning Place.

== History ==
British army officers stationed in Albany during the Seven Years' War, also known as the French and Indian Wars, were the impetus for the creation of a local lodge. The soldiers were a part of a military lodge that was organized in 1737 under the auspices of the Irish Registry, they met in Albany in 1758 and when they left certain members of the local populace who had joined the Masonic order were allowed to continue to meet and recruit for the Order until they could get own charter as a lodge. In 1765 they were made the Union Lodge #1 and in 1766 they were given the deed to a lot on the corner of Maiden Lane and Lodge Street by the city. The cornerstone of the first Temple on this site was laid the next year in 1767, with the Temple being dedicated in 1768. Prior to this, meetings were held at Richard Cartwright's Southside Inn. After the American Revolutionary War the lodge gave up its charter and was reorganized as Mount Vernon Lodge #3 in 1807.

The Temple is the site of meetings for five different lodges. Mount Vernon Number 3, the former Union Number 1, is the oldest lodge in the state of New York outside of the New York City and meets at the Temple. Guttenburg Lodge Number 737, founded in 1873 as a German language speaking lodge moved to the Temple when it was built in 1896, from their location at the WM Whitney Building. They later dropped German for English in 1900. Wadsworth Lodge Number 417 has met in the Temple from the founding of the current in building in 1896, having been founded in 1856 and having different meeting places throughout Downtown Albany prior to that. Masters Lodge #5 also meets at the Albany Temple. Also Ancient Temple lodge #14 meets at the building, a merger of Ancient City and Temple lodges that occurred in the 1970s.

== Structure ==
The Masonic Temple sits at the corner of Maiden Lane (now Corning Place in honor of Mayor Erastus Corning) and Lodge Street, and is built of granite in the Renaissance Revival style. The architects were Fuller & Wheeler. The interiors feature oak woodwork and rich classical ornament in plaster. The main lodge rooms are each two stories in height. The larger room (the Ten Eyck room) has stained glass windows and an 1896 2-manual, 18-rank tracker pipe organ by J. W. Steere & Sons of Springfield MA. The smaller room (the Weaver room) has an 1874 2-manual, 18-rank tracker organ by William Johnson of Westfield MA - it and the carved walnut furnishings of the room were moved from the previous temple. On the top floor of the temple is a room with a proscenium stage, used for the degrees of the Valley of Albany, Ancient and Accepted Scottish Rite. Among the furnishings is an elaborately carved oak throne featuring Scottish Rite emblems, designed and presented by Bro. Solomon Strasser in 1898 and weighing over 400 pounds. Franklin Roosevelt was a member while Governor of New York and a metal ramp was built leading to the banquet hall for him. This metal ramp is still in existence and is still used on a daily basis. Theodore Roosevelt was also a member.
