= Lebanon Springs Union Free School =

- U.S. National Register of Historic Places
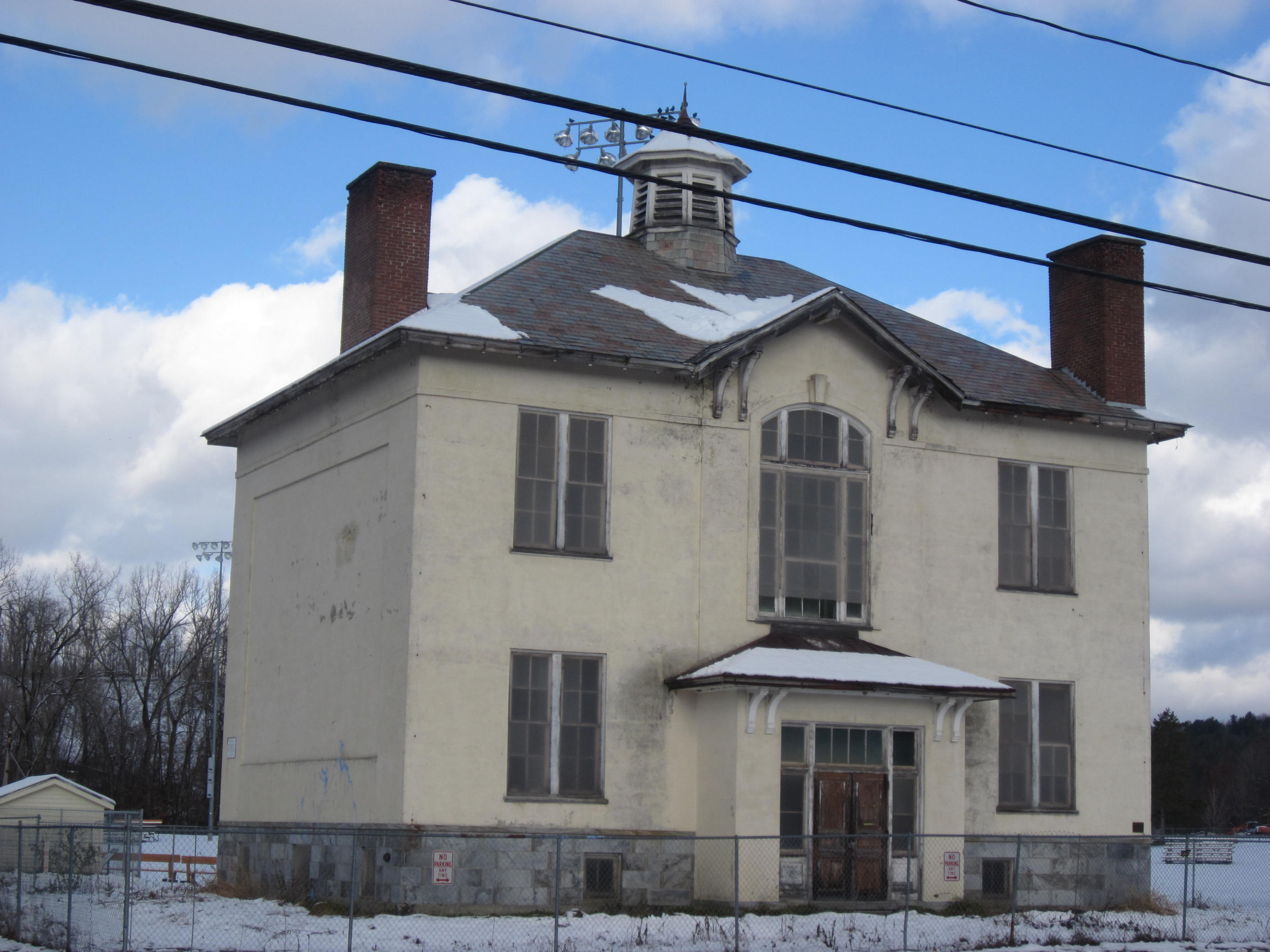
- Lebanon Springs Union Free School, December 2011

- Location within New York Location within the United States
- Location: NY 22 E of jct. with Cemetery Rd., New Lebanon, New York
- Coordinates: 42°28′26″N 73°22′57″W
- Area: 7.6 acres (3.1 ha)
- Built: 1913
- Architect: Fuller & Robinson Company
- Architectural style: Bungalow/Craftsman
- NRHP reference No.: 91001727
- Added to NRHP: November 21, 1991

Lebanon Springs Union Free School is a historic school building located at New Lebanon in Columbia County, New York. It was built in 1913 and is a rectangular, two story, hipped roof brick building coated in stucco. It sits on a tooled concrete foundation and is topped with a slate roof. Atop the roof is an eight sided louvered belfry. Also on the property are the remains of a railroad trestle over the Wyomanock Creek.

It was added to the National Register of Historic Places in 1991.
