= Church of Our Saviour (New Lebanon, New York) =

Historic church in New York, United States

- U.S. National Register of Historic Places
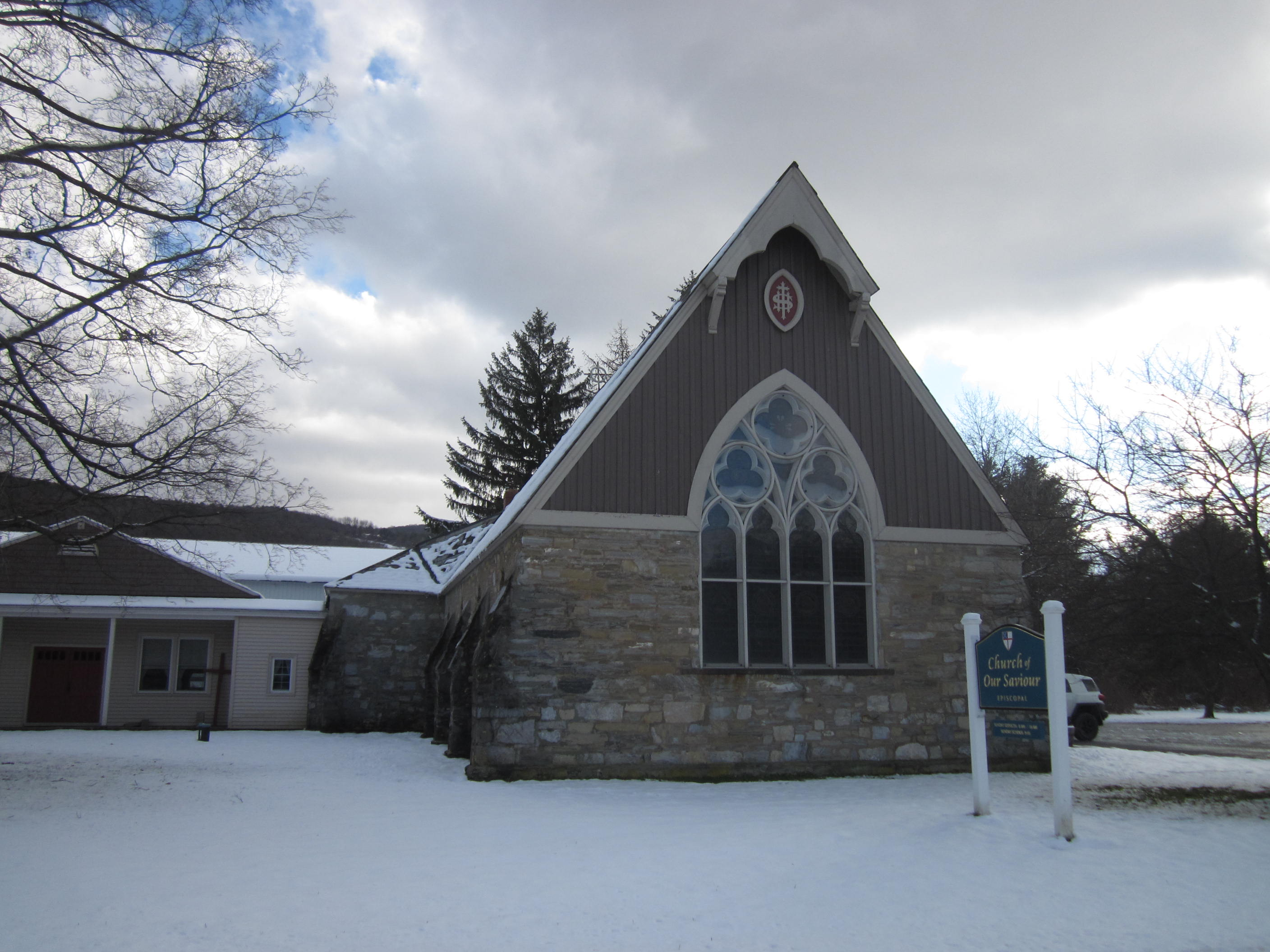
- Church of Our Saviour, December 2011

- Location within New York Location within the United States
- Location: NY 22, near jct. with US 20, Hamlet of Lebanon Springs, New Lebanon, New York
- Coordinates: 42°28′27″N 73°22′50″W
- Area: 1.9 acres (0.77 ha)
- Built: 1872
- Architect: Edgerton, Charles S., et al
- Architectural style: Gothic Revival
- NRHP reference No.: 97000067
- Added to NRHP: February 14, 1997

Church of Our Saviour is a historic Episcopal church located at Lebanon Springs in the town of New Lebanon, Columbia County, New York. It was built between 1872 and 1881, and is a simple stone and wooden building in the English Gothic Revival style. It consists of a rectangular nave, rear chancel, side vestibule and small, rear sacristy. The building features a steep slate roof, three stage bell tower, and lancet-arched windows. Also on the property are a contributing rectory (c. 1890) and garage (1934).

It was listed on the National Register of Historic Places in 1997.
