= Donnelly House (New Lebanon, New York) =

Historic house in New York, United States

- U.S. National Register of Historic Places
- Location within New York Location within the United States
- Location: Cty. Rd. 5, New Lebanon, New York
- Coordinates: 42°26′49″N 73°26′0″W
- Area: 24.6 acres (10.0 ha)
- Built: 1760
- Architectural style: Colonial
- NRHP reference No.: 00000880
- Added to NRHP: August 2, 2000

Donnelly House is a historic home located at New Lebanon in Columbia County, New York. It was built about 1760 and is a modestly scaled saltbox style residence. It is a two-story, three-bay, center chimney, frame dwelling with narrow siding on a fieldstone foundation. It measures 38 feet, 7 inches wide and 26 feet, 1/2 inch deep. Also on the property are two small barns.

It was added to the National Register of Historic Places in 2000.
