= Elisha Gilbert House =

Historic house in New York, United States

- U.S. National Register of Historic Places
- Location within New York Location within the United States
- Location: US 20, New Lebanon, New York
- Coordinates: 42°28′9″N 73°25′46″W
- Area: 11.8 acres (4.8 ha)
- Built: 1794
- Architectural style: Federal
- NRHP reference No.: 84002098
- Added to NRHP: September 7, 1984

Elisha Gilbert House is a historic home located at New Lebanon in Columbia County, New York. Built in 1794, the home is a massive, two-story frame Federal style residence with a gambrel roof and a five-bay facade with a center entrance pavilion and clapboard siding. The attic level once held a Masonic Lodge meeting hall. Also on the property is a family cemetery and 19th century barn.

It was added to the National Register of Historic Places in 1984.
