= Belhurst Castle =

Historic house in New York, United States

- U.S. National Register of Historic Places
- New York State Register of Historic Places
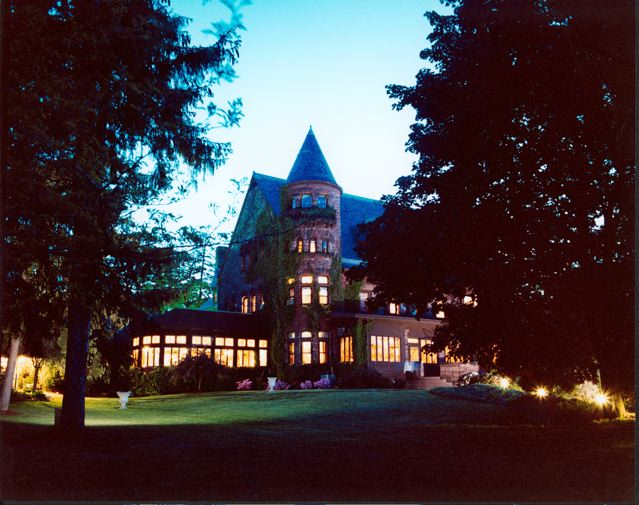
- Belhurst_Castle, July 2007

- Location within New York Location within the United States
- Location: Lochland Rd., Geneva, New York
- Coordinates: 42°50′18″N 76°58′39″W
- Area: 23.5 acres (9.5 ha)
- Built: 1888–1892
- Architect: Fuller & Wheeler
- Architectural style: Romanesque, Richardsonian Romanesque
- NRHP reference No.: 86003728
- NYSRHP No.: 06906.000007

Significant dates
- Added to NRHP: January 29, 1987
- Designated NYSRHP: December 9, 1986

Belhurst Castle is a former private residence on the shores of Seneca Lake in Geneva, New York, United States. It was designed by architects Fuller & Wheeler and built between 1885 and 1889. The three-story, nine bay wide Romanesque Revival style mansion is constructed of Medina sandstone. It has a slate gable roof, one-story solarium, and four rectangular stone chimneys. It features projecting porches, bays, towers with conical and pyramidal roofs, eyebrow windows, and a porte cochere with Syrian arch.

It was listed on the National Register of Historic Places in 1987.

Supplemented by modern facilities, Belhurst Castle has been adapted for hotel and retail uses. It holds a hotel with three choices of lodging (Vinifera Inn, Chambers in the Castle, and White Springs Manor); two ballrooms to host weddings, two restaurants (Edgar's Restaurant and Stonecutters); spa, and a winery.

Belhurst Castle has previously been used as a speakeasy during Prohibition, casino, and supper club.
