= West Lebanon, New York =

- Hamlet
- Location within New York Location within the United States
- Coordinates: 42°29′10″N 73°27′58″W
- Country: United States
- State: New York
- County: Columbia
- Elevation: 623 ft (190 m)
- Time zone: UTC-5 (Eastern (EST))
  - Summer (DST): UTC-4 (EDT)
- ZIP Code: 12195
- Area codes: 518 & 838
- GNIS feature ID: 970782

West Lebanon is a hamlet in New Lebanon, Columbia County, New York, United States. The community is located along U.S. Route 20 7.6 miles (12.2 km) east-southeast of Nassau. West Lebanon had a post office with ZIP Code 12195.
