= Tony Saletan =

American folk singer (1931–2025)

- Born: Anthony David Saletan; June 29, 1931; New York City, U.S.
- Died: August 26, 2025 (aged 94) Tacoma, Washington, U.S.
- Genre: Folk
- Occupations: Musician, singer, song finder, folk dance caller/leader
- Instruments: Vocals, guitar, banjo, piano, recorder
- Years active: 1955–2015
- Labels: Folk-Legacy Records, Prestige Records

Anthony David Saletan (June 29, 1931 – August 26, 2025) was an American folk singer, children's instructional television pioneer, and music educator. Always known professionally as "Tony Saletan," he was responsible for the modern rediscovery, in the mid-1950s, of two of the genre's best-known songs, "Michael Row the Boat Ashore" and "Kumbaya". In 1955, he was the first performer to appear on Boston's educational television station, WGBH. In 1969, Saletan was the first musical guest to appear on Sesame Street.

== Background ==
Born and raised in New York City, Saletan attended the Walden School. For a brief period during his childhood, his piano teacher was a young Leonard Bernstein. While a teen, he was involved in the Henry Wallace presidential campaign of 1948, in which original music in the folk style was important. After receiving his undergraduate and master's degrees in music education at Harvard University, Saletan settled in the Boston area, where for several years he appeared on educational television (WGBH), taught music in the Newton, Massachusetts public schools, and gave private guitar lessons. During this time he married and raised a son and a daughter. He also became involved in folk dancing and calling of contra dances. Saletan frequently taught at Pinewoods Dance Camp in Plymouth, Massachusetts.

Later in life, Saletan moved with his second wife to Tacoma, Washington and raised another daughter and a step-son. Saletan died from complications of Alzheimer's disease in Tacoma, on August 26, 2025, at the age of 94.

== Shaker Village Work Camp and the Folk Revival ==
Saletan spent the summer of 1953 at Buck’s Rock Work Camp leading the campers in regular folk song sessions.

In 1954, Tony Saletan was preparing to work as folksong leader at the Shaker Village Work Camp. He searched the Widener Library of Harvard University for material to teach the villagers that summer. Out of that research, he adapted the song "Michael Row the Boat Ashore" from the 1867 songbook Slave Songs of the United States to create the version that is well-known today. "I judged that the tune was very singable, added some harmony (a guitar accompaniment) and thought the one-word chorus would be an easy hit with the teens (it was). But a typical original verse consisted of one line repeated once, and I thought a rhyme would be more interesting to the teenagers at Shaker Village Work Camp, where I introduced it. So I adapted traditional African-American couplets in place of the original verses." Saletan's adaptation was included in the Village's 1954 songbook, Songs of Work.

During the summer of 1954, Saletan attended a performance by Pete Seeger, where Seeger invited audience members to come on stage and teach him a song. Saletan volunteered, borrowed Seeger's banjo, and sang "Michael Row the Boat Ashore," as he had recently reconstructed it. Seeger said he liked the song and asked to learn it. Seeger was soon singing it with The Weavers, one of the most important vocal groups leading the American folk music revival of the 1950s to mid-1960s. Saletan shared a 1958 copyright in his adaptation with the members of the Weavers. A single based on Saletan's version was released in 1960 by the American folk quintet the Highwaymen under the abbreviated title, "Michael", and reached number one on the U.S. and British hit parades in September 1961.

Joe Hickerson, co-founder of the Folksmiths, credits Saletan for introducing him to the song "Kumbaya" in 1957 (Saletan had learned it from Lynn Rohrbough, co-proprietor with his wife Katherine of the camp songbook publisher Cooperative Recreation Service). The first LP recording of "Kumbaya" was released in 1958 by the Folksmiths. Folksinger Peggy Seeger was also taught several songs by Saletan, which she later recorded.

== Television and recording career ==
Saletan was the first person to appear on WGBH, Channel 2, when Boston's public educational television station made its on-air debut on May 2, 1955. He sang the theme song for Come and See, a program aimed at preschoolers. In those years, he also presented live children's concerts, organized by his manager, Manuel ("Manny") Greenhill (1916–1996). Following a 1959-1960 world tour sponsored by the U.S. State Department, Saletan released the album I'm a Stranger Here on Prestige Records (1962). On his return from abroad, he created Sing, Children, Sing for national distribution on educational television, based on an earlier WGBH project, Music Grade II. In the 1960s, Saletan also hosted several episodes of What's New, broadcast "field trips" to historic locations with associated songs.

In 1964, a year after their marriage, Saletan and Irene Kossoy (formerly and subsequently of the Kossoy Sisters) joined with Jackie Washington Landrón to form the Boston Folk Trio, which presented school concerts through the non-profit Young Audiences Arts for Learning, which was later directed by John Langstaff. In the mid-1960s, the Saletans similarly performed school concerts in the New York City area along with Happy Traum. The couple also performed as Tony and Irene Saletan. In 1970, they released an album on Folk-Legacy Records, Tony and Irene Saletan: Folk Songs & Ballads. They also made a 7" vinyl recording of four songs for the Boston Mutual Life Insurance Company, titled The Ballad of Boston and Other New England Folk Tunes. Tony and Irene performed together at the Fox Hollow Folk Festival in 1971, as well as with Irene's sister, Ellen, and Ellen's then husband, Robin Christenson. None of Saletan's recordings include either "Michael" or "Kumbaya," but he can be heard singing and discussing both during a 2017 podcast interview.

On December 16, 1969, Saletan made a guest appearance during the first season (episode 27) of Sesame Street, the iconic children's television program. In the first of four segments on which he appeared, Saletan leads the show's children and adult regulars (including Big Bird and Oscar) in an adaptation of the traditional workers' alphabet song, "So Merry, So Merry Are We", as well as a traditional counting song, "Ten Little Angels". In the second, he sings and takes ideas from the children to invent new verses for "I Wish I Was a Mole in the Ground", and then plays "Cripple Creek" on banjo as Gordon demonstrates the limberjack. In the third segment, he sings Woody Guthrie's "Pick it Up" and then "Mi Chacra" ("my farm"), teaching animal names in Spanish. (This was the first time Sesame Street featured content in Spanish.) Saletan concludes the show with Guthrie's "Gonna Take Everybody (All Work Together)".

In the early 1970s, Tony Saletan hosted three public television series for children, produced by Western Instructional Television (Hollywood, California): The Song Bag, Let's All Sing with Tony Saletan, and Singing Down the Road. Two record albums were issued from these shows mostly drawn from American folksongs, including those discovered and developed for teaching young Shaker Villagers. The first album to emerge from the WIT shows, Song Bag with Tony Saletan, likewise had an associated teacher's guide and songbook. Saletan also recorded Songs and Sounds of the Sea (National Geographic Society 1973), Revolutionary Tea (with the Yankee Tunesmiths, Old North Bridge Records 1975), and George & Ruth (songs of the Spanish Civil War, Educational Alternatives 2004).

== Discography ==
- I'm a Stranger Here (Prestige International 13036, 1962)
- Folksongs & Ballads (with Irene Saletan) (Folk Legacy FSI-37, 1970; available from Smithsonian Folkways) Many cuts available on YouTube
- Songs and Sounds of the Sea (National Geographic Society 705, 1973)
- Song Bag with Tony Saletan (Western ITV Recordings WV-1103, 1974)
- Revolutionary Tea (Old North Bridge Recordings, 1975)
- Let's All Sing with Tony Saletan (Western ITV Recordings WV-1102, 1976) Episode available for viewing on YouTube
- George & Ruth: Songs & Letters of the Spanish Civil War (2004, CD Baby 2006) (full audio recording available on YouTube)

== See also ==
- Shaker Village Work Group
