= Mount Lebanon Shaker Village =

Coordinates: 42.4596°N 73.3806°W

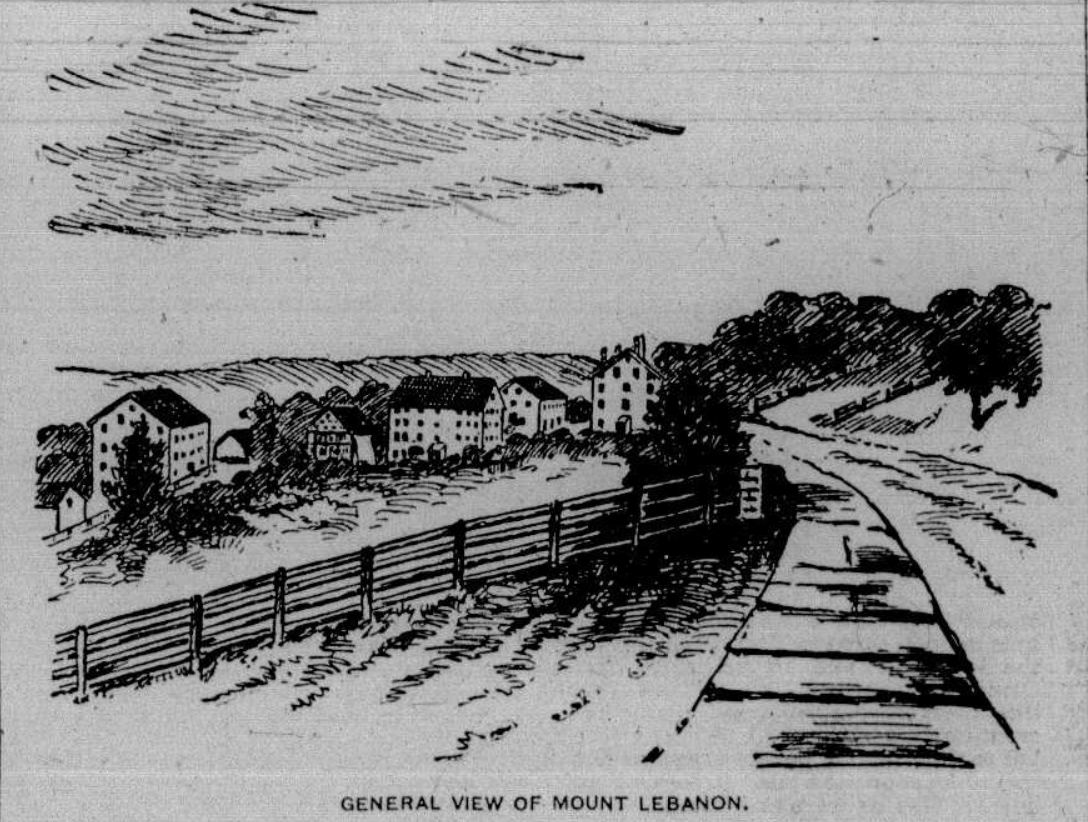
Mount Lebanon, Philadelphia Times archives February 12, 1893

The Mount Lebanon Shaker Village is a historic site associated with the Shakers, a Protestant religious denomination. Founded as a communal group in the 1787, the Shakers located their Central Ministry in New Lebanon, New York, United States, and built a village that eventually covered several thousand acres and housed hundreds of Believers. (See also Mount Lebanon Shaker Society and Isaac N. Youngs.)

Shaker Museum and Library is moving from Old Chatham, New York to the Mount Lebanon Shaker Village. They are in the process of restoring the buildings of the former Shaker North Family there.

== See also ==
- Shaker Seed Company
