= Shaker Museum and Library =

Research library

Coordinates: 42.456687°N 73.381779°W

The Shaker Museum and Library in Chatham, New York is a major cultural institution and research library dedicated to the history and material culture of the Shakers, a Protestant religious denomination founded in America by Ann Lee and her followers in 1774, and known more formally as the United Society of Believers in Christ's Second Appearing.

Originating in 1950 with the private collection of the museum's founder, John S. Williams Sr., the Shaker Museum was accredited in 1972 by the American Alliance of Museums. In 1986 it was named a "Primary Organization" by the New York State Council on the Arts. The museum's collections are still housed in buildings on ten acres on Shaker Museum Road in Old Chatham formerly owned by Mr. Williams.

In 2004, the Shaker Museum acquired historic buildings and land at the site of the Mount Lebanon Shaker Village in New Lebanon, New York. This is the site of the North Family Shaker community adjacent to the Darrow School. Also in 2004, the Great Stone Barn, built in 1859 but gutted by fire in 1972, was listed on the World Monuments Fund. An attempt to fully stabilize the massive structure was only partly successful. In April 2014, the museum acquired 61 acres of adjacent land comprising the historic North Pastures, bringing the total amount of protected land owned by the museum to over 90 acres.

Over the past 15 years, the museum has been open to the public only through guided tours and pop-up exhibitions in nearby Kinderhook and Chatham.

In 2025, the Museum opened its new Administration and Library building and broke ground for a new museum designed by Annabelle Selldorf in Chatham, New York. The construction of the new $35 million facility is expected to be completed in 2027, with opening scheduled in 2028.
