= New Lebanon, New York =

- Town
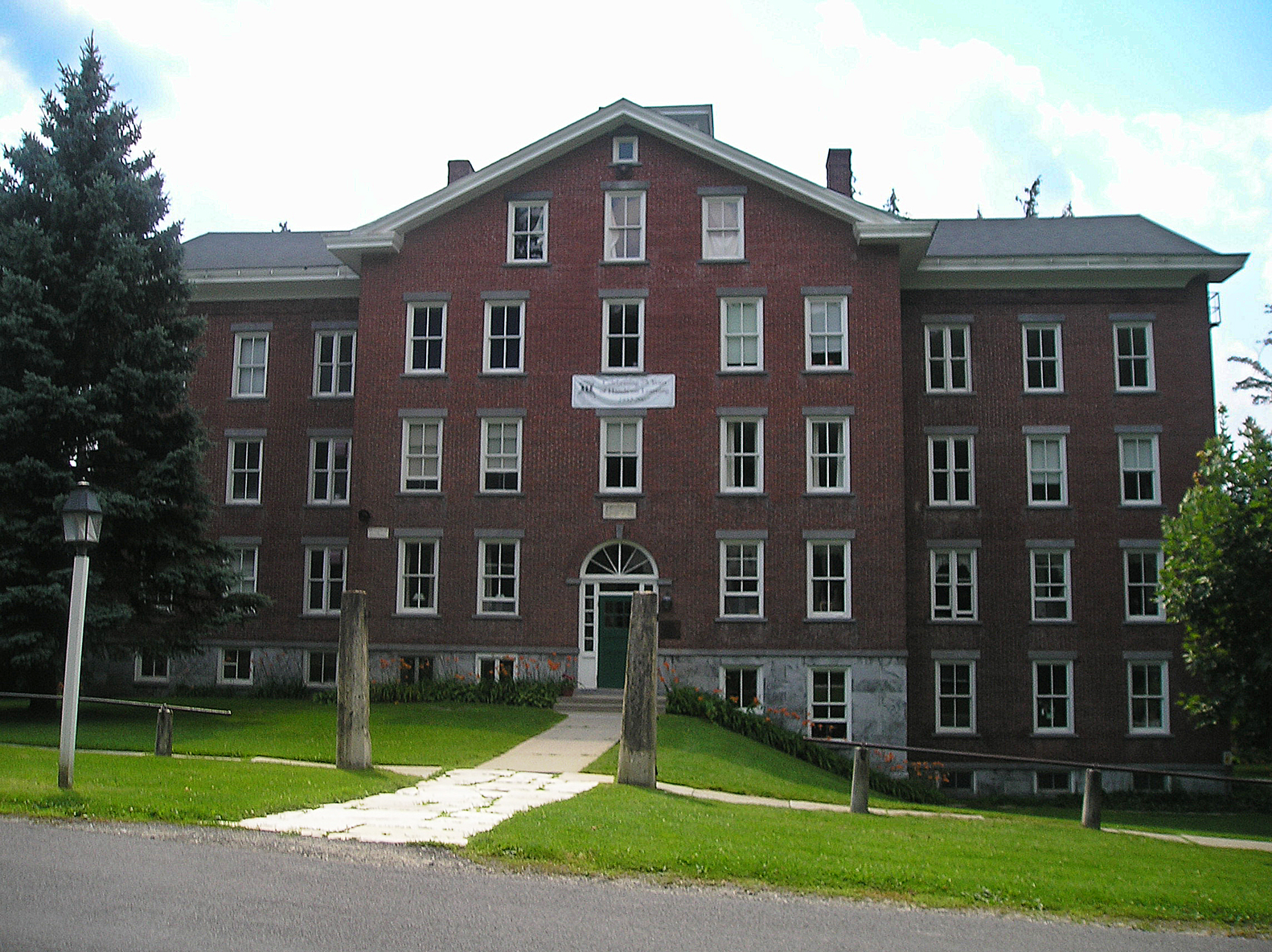
- Darrow School, formerly the Mount Lebanon Shaker Society

- Location in New York
- Coordinates: 42°28′0″N 73°26′36″W
- Country: United States
- State: New York
- County: Columbia

Government
  - Type: Town Council
  - Town Supervisor: Tistrya Houghtling (D)
  - Town Council: Members' List: • Norman Rasmussen (D); • Kevin Smith, Sr. (D); • Jesse Newton (I); • Mark Baumli (D)

Area
  - Total: 35.95 sq mi (93.10 km^{2})
  - Land: 35.83 sq mi (92.80 km^{2})
  - Water: 0.12 sq mi (0.30 km^{2})
- Elevation: 1,306 ft (398 m)

Population (2020)
  - Total: 2,514
  - Density: 70.16/sq mi (27.09/km^{2})
- Time zone: UTC-5 (Eastern (EST))
  - Summer (DST): UTC-4 (EDT)
- ZIP Codes: 12125 (New Lebanon); 12195 (West Lebanon); 12024 (Brainard); 12029 (Canaan); 12060 (East Chatham); 12062 (East Nassau)
- Area code: 518
- FIPS code: 36-021-50452
- GNIS feature ID: 0979267
- Website: townofnewlebanon.com

New Lebanon is a town in Columbia County, New York, United States, 24 miles (39 km) southeast of Albany. The population was 2,514 at the 2020 census.

The town of New Lebanon is in the northeastern corner of Columbia County. The center of town is at the intersection of U.S. Route 20 and New York State Route 22.

== History ==
New Lebanon was formed from the town of Canaan in 1818.

New Lebanon was the main spiritual home of the Shakers. The Mount Lebanon Shaker Society had 609 members in 1864. The most historic structures now belong to the Shaker Museum | Mount Lebanon. Some of the other surviving buildings are home to the Darrow School. Still others have been converted into a Sufi retreat center called The Abode of the Message. The latter is the former residence of Vilayat Inayat Khan, and was the home of the current Pir of the Inayati Order, Zia Inayat Khan until 2017.

In addition to the Mount Lebanon Shaker Society, the Church of Our Saviour, Donnelly House, Elisha Gilbert House, Lebanon Springs Union Free School, and Gov. Samuel J. Tilden Monument are listed on the National Register of Historic Places.

== Geography ==
According to the United States Census Bureau, the town has a total area of 36.0 square miles (93.2 km^{2}), of which 35.9 square miles (92.9 km^{2}) is land and 0.12 square miles (0.3 km^{2}), or 0.32%, is water.

The northern town line is the border of Rensselaer County, and the eastern town boundary is the border of Berkshire County, Massachusetts.

There is a warm thermal spring named Lebanon Spring, located on Spring Hill Road that had been used by the Native Americans.

== Demographics ==
Historical population
Census	Pop.	Note	%±
1820	2,808		—
1830	2,695		−4.0%
1840	2,536		−5.9%
1850	2,300		−9.3%
1860	2,187		−4.9%
1870	2,124		−2.9%
1880	2,245		5.7%
1890	1,765		−21.4%
1900	1,556		−11.8%
1910	1,378		−11.4%
1920	1,133		−17.8%
1930	1,081		−4.6%
1940	1,259		16.5%
1950	1,415		12.4%
1960	1,674		18.3%
1970	2,035		21.6%
1980	2,271		11.6%
1990	2,379		4.8%
2000	2,454		3.2%
2010	2,305		−6.1%
2020	2,514		9.1%
U.S. Decennial Census 2020

As of the census of 2000, there were 2,454 people, 983 households, and 651 families residing in the town. The population density was 68.4 inhabitants per square mile (26.4/km^{2}). There were 1,201 housing units at an average density of 33.5 per square mile (12.9/km^{2}). The racial makeup of the town was 95.52% White, 1.26% African American, 0.08% Native American, 1.34% Asian, 0.16% Pacific Islander, 0.41% from other races, and 1.22% from two or more races. Hispanic or Latino of any race was 1.10% of the population.

There were 983 households, out of which 30.2% had children under the age of 18 living with them, 50.7% were married couples living together, 10.8% had a female householder with no husband present, and 33.7% were non-families. 26.3% of all households were made up of individuals, and 9.1% had someone living alone who was 65 years of age or older. The average household size was 2.38 and the average family size was 2.87.

In the town, the population was spread out, with 26.1% under the age of 18, 6.3% from 18 to 24, 26.0% from 25 to 44, 28.7% from 45 to 64, and 12.9% who were 65 years of age or older. The median age was 40 years. For every 100 females, there were 95.5 males. For every 100 females age 18 and over, there were 94.6 males.

The median income for a household in the town was $44,805, and the median income for a family was $50,417. Males had a median income of $34,524 versus $30,590 for females. The per capita income for the town was $20,529. About 6.8% of families and 9.0% of the population were below the poverty line, including 15.7% of those under age 18 and 4.7% of those age 65 or over.

== Communities and locations ==
- Darrow School – formerly a boys' prep school, now coeducational boarding school.
- Lebanon Springs – A hamlet northeast of New Lebanon village on Route 22.
- New Britain – A hamlet in the southwestern part of the town.
- New Lebanon – The hamlet of New Lebanon in the eastern section of the town.
- New Lebanon Center – A hamlet west of New Lebanon village.
- The Abode of the Message (formerly the Mount Lebanon Shaker Village) – A residential spiritual community, conference center and school of esoteric study.
- West Lebanon – A hamlet in the northwestern part of the town on Route 20.

== Notable people ==
- Katherine E. Hull, went missing from Lebanon Springs in 1936
- Samuel J. Tilden, New York politician and U.S. presidential candidate in 1876
- George Henry Williams, attorney and judge
