= Hannah Cohoon =

American painter

- Born: Hannah Harrison; February 1, 1788; Williamstown, Massachusetts
- Died: January 7, 1864 (aged 75); Hancock, Massachusetts
- Known for: Painting
- Notable work: The Tree of Life
- Movement: Shaker

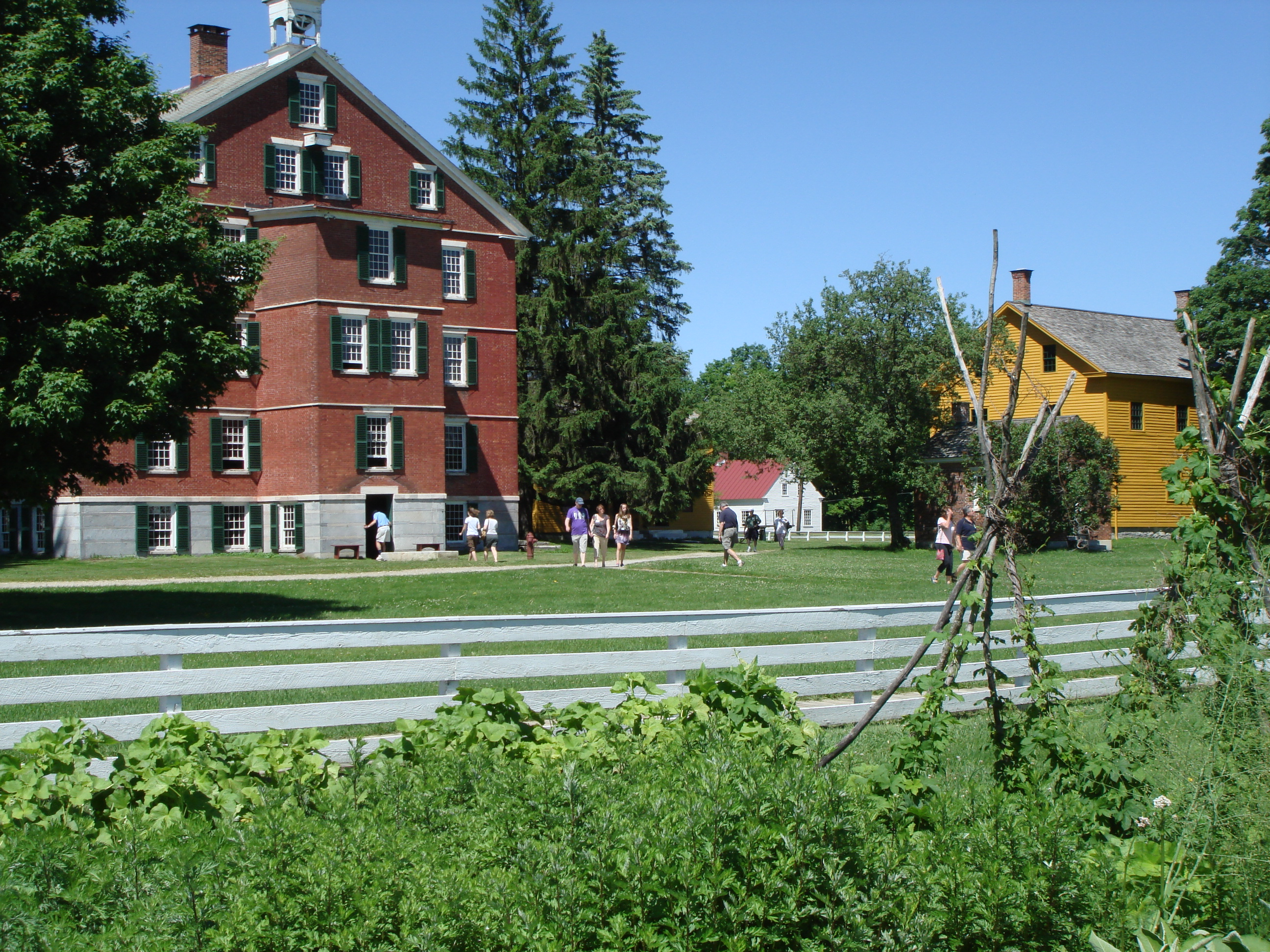
Hancock Shaker Village, Massachusetts

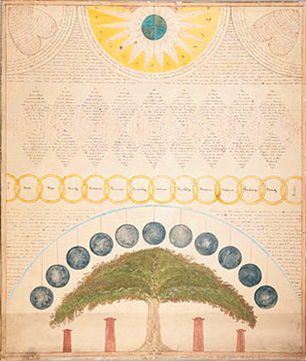
Unknown artist, Shaker gift drawing, mid-19th century

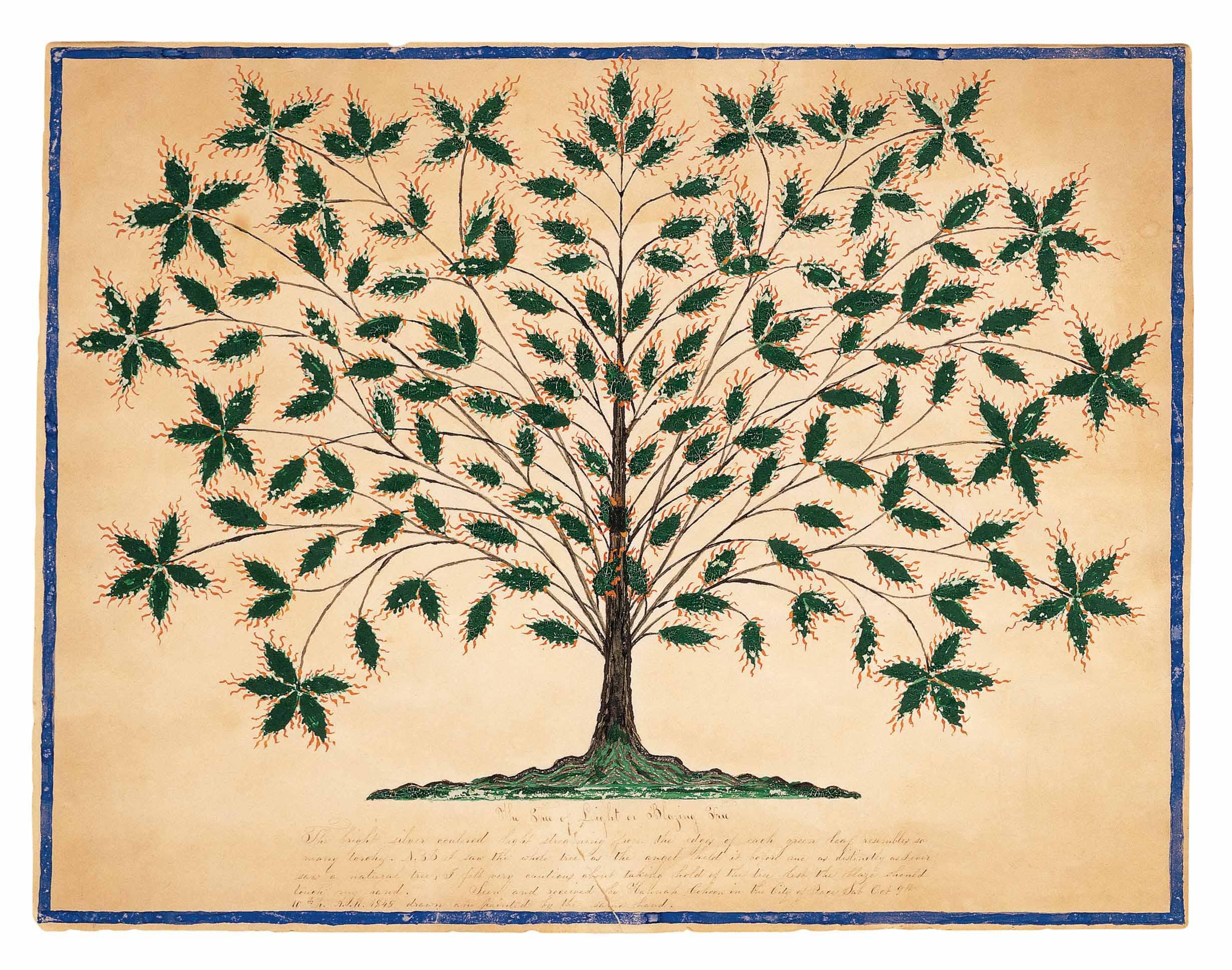
Hannah Cohoon, Tree of Life or Blazing Tree, 1845

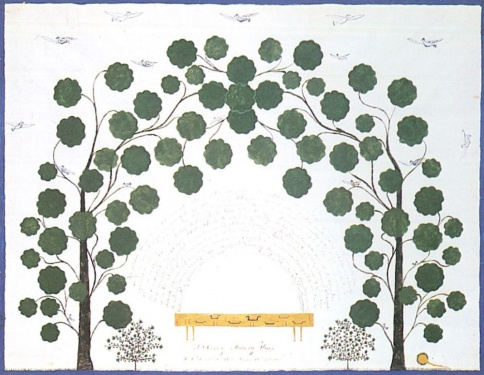
Hannah Cohoon, A Bower of Mulberry Trees, 1854

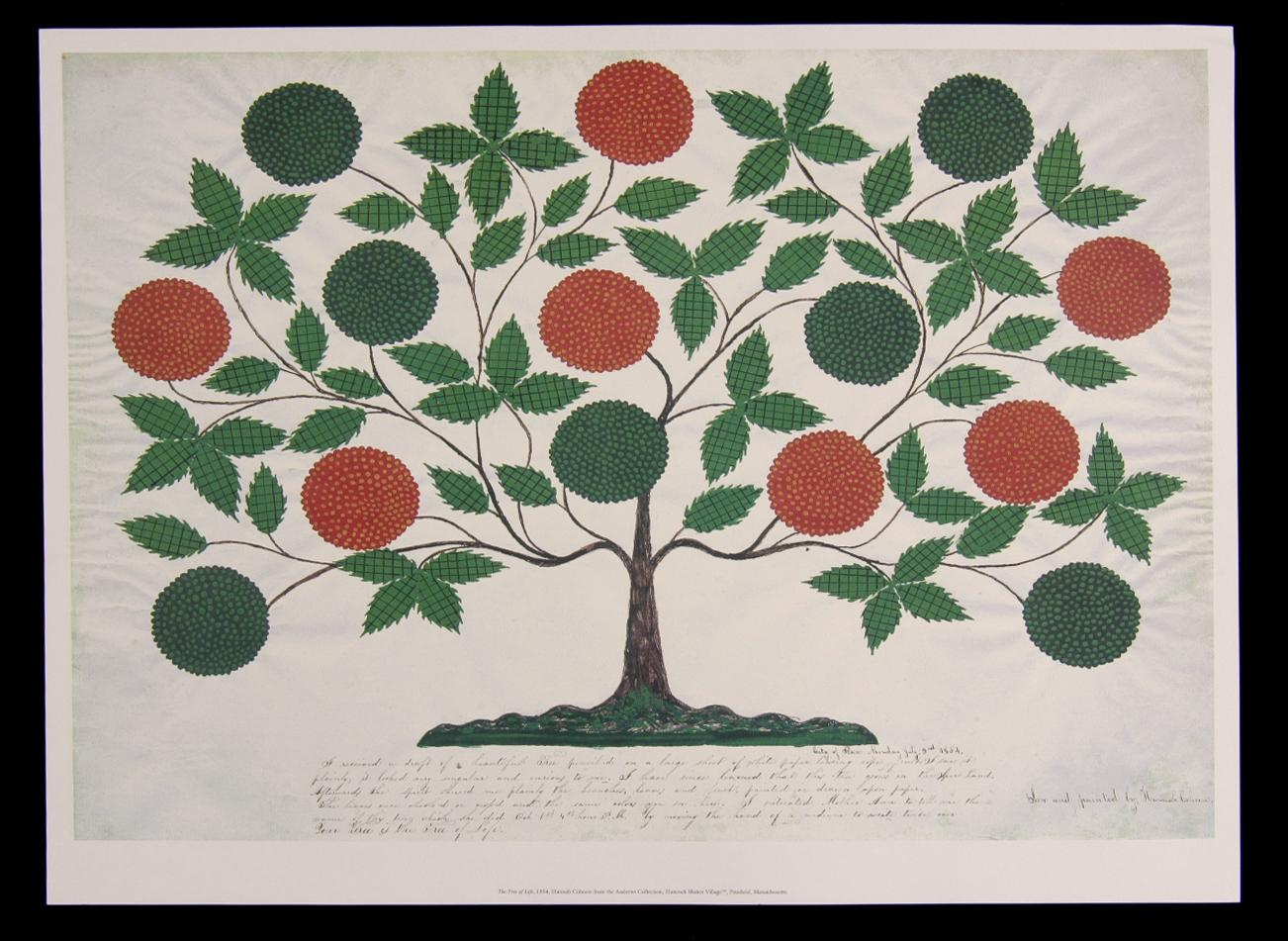
Hannah Cohoon, The Tree of Life, 1854

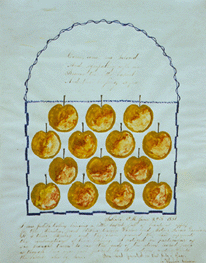
Hannah Cohoon, A Little Basket Full of Beautiful Apples, 1856

Hannah Cohoon (February 1, 1788 – January 7, 1864) was an American painter born in Williamstown, Massachusetts and a member of Hancock Shaker Village. She joined that community in 1817 at the age 29. During a time of revival known as the Era of Manifestations, she produced several drawings known as "gift drawings" — artistic works made through religious inspiration. Her works have become iconic of Shaker religious expression. She died in 1864 and was buried in the cemetery of the Hancock Church Family.

== Background ==
Cohoon became a member of the Hancock Shaker Village and made "gift drawings" that recounted spiritual visitations received during the Era of Manifestations encountered by Shakers in the mid-19th century. Uncommonly for Shaker gift drawings, she signed her drawings, so that the works have been attributed to her. Cohoon had a unique style that was more abstract, simple and personal. She used impasto techniques to create texture within the drawings.

== Early life ==
Hannah Harrison was one of three girls born to Noah B. Harrison (1759–1789) and Huldah Bacon Harrison (1763–1809). She was born in Williamstown, Massachusetts, on February 1, 1788. Noah Harrison had been an 18-year-old drummer boy during the Revolutionary War in June and July 1777. In 1780 he was a private for a Berkshire, Massachusetts, company during the war. He died the year after Hannah was born. (Note: Noah was born to Titus and Ann Harrison on July 12, 1759. The Harrisons were from Litchfield, Connecticut and moved to Williamstown, Massachusetts about 1761 and by 1765 he had a house on Main Street. Titus then bought property on Water Street where Titus operated a mill on the Green River. Titus, a successful millwright and large landowner, gave his sons and daughters land; Noah received 30 acres along Green River in 1785. Noah and Huldah lived on Water Street with their daughters. In 1790 Huldah was the head of the household of four females in Williamstown. After Noah's death, Huldah married Joseph Whitcomb.)

Hannah's sisters were Lois and Polly, born respectively in 1784 and 1785.

Hannah had a son named Harrison and a daughter named Mariah. She became a member of the Hancock Shaker community on March 15, 1817, when she was 29, Harrison was 5 and Mariah was 3 years of age. She signed the covenant there in 1823. In 1843 she signed the Sacred Roll. Her surname for the works of art in the mid-1800s was Cohoon.

== Works ==
=== Background ===
A period called the Era of Manifestations between 1837 and the 1850s represented a major spiritual shift within the Shaker community where "believers" regularly received spiritual visions which were revealed in song, drawings and dances. The people who received the visions were called "instruments".

Shaker founders and early leaders had often preached about heavenly treasures greatly to be desired. Never before, however, had Shakers dared to picture these heavenly treasures. Never before had Believers seen with their eyes the close formal resemblance between the things of eternity and the things of time. The subject matter and form of the instruments' images had been prohibited for many years as a threat to the purity of the sect. But a celestial content tempered and made useful this potentially radical art.

— Spiritual Spectacles: Vision and Image in Mid-Nineteenth-Century Shakerism.

The profound experience resulted in Shakers expressing the "gifts" received from Spirit in drawings, messages and songs. Of about 200 surviving gift drawings, most were made by women who lived in Hancock Shaker Village, Massachusetts, or Lebanon, New York. One example is Gift Drawing: A Reward of True Faithfulness from Mother Lucy to Eleanor Potter by Polly Ann (Jane) Reed (1818-1881). Called "gift drawings", the works were based upon wondrous messages that they received during Spiritual visitations. They were made with "painstaking precision" using watercolors or transparent inks. They generally included many small emblems, considered "wildly extravagant by Shaker standards," such as treasure chests, heavenly mansions, golden chariots, flowers and fruits. and included written messages of friendship or reverence, with calligraphic intricacies, resembling fine lacework. Generally, works would not be signed by the artist.

Key artists from the Shaker community were Cohoon, Polly Collins and Joseph Wicker. The Era of Manifestations ended when Shaker community members became embarrassed by the "emotional excesses and mystical expressions of this period."

=== Known works ===
Cohoon began creating her drawings and art in the year of 1845. She adopted a unique approach for her drawings as compared to other Shaker works. She used thick paint in primary or secondary colors that created an impasto texture, using bold, expressive brushstrokes. Her compositions were dedicated to a single object or scene with geometric patterns. Rather than messages intended for others, she wrote directly of visionary experiences, and she signed her works.

Cohoon is primarily known for her spirit drawings with trees:

- The Tree of Life or Blazing Tree, 1845
- The Tree of Life, 1854
- A Bower of Mulberry Trees, 1854, was made as a result of Cohoon's vision of a feast of cakes by Shaker elders under mulberry trees. The depiction of the long table in the drawing represents holy feasts held in biennial meetings, and the presence of the doves overhead represents the bounties that the believer would experience in heaven. Germaine Greer, author of The Obstacle Race: The Fortunes of Women Painters and Their Work, likened Cohoon's drawing to primitive art by Catholic artists of "an earthly paradise with trees in flower and fruit."

A "leading figure in the era of spirit manifestations", Joseph Wicker (1789–1852), an elder in the Shaker community, created a gift drawing of a tree in 1844 which may have been inspiration of Hannah's pictures of trees.

Cohoon described how the vision came to her to create the Tree of Life drawing:

I received a draft of a beautiful Tree pencil'd on large sheet of plain white paper bearing ripe fruit. I saw it plainly, it looked very singular and curious to me. I have since learned that this Tree grows in the Spirit Land. Afterwards the Spirit showed me plainly the branches, leaves and fruit, painted or drawn upon paper. The leaves were check'd or cross'd and the same colours you see here. I entreated Mother Ann to tell me the name of this tree which she did on Oct. 1st 4th hour P.M. by moving the hand of a medium to write twice over Your Tree is the Tree of Life.

The tree of life has become an icon to represent Shakers. In 1996 another painting attributed to Cohoon was estimated prior to sale at Sotheby's of $250,000 to $350,000. The painting, somewhat similar to and having the same name as Tree of Light or Blazing Tree, is estimated at seven times the record amount for a Shaker drawing. It sold at Sotheby's for $299,500 to the Museum of American Folk Art in January 1997.

She also made A Little Basket Full of Beautiful Apples in 1856. Adam Gopnik wrote in his article "Shining Tree of Life" for The New Yorker that the drawing is "among the key drawings in American art, with a tonic sense of abundance—all the apples just alike, each with its rub-on of rouge, like blush applied by an adolescent girl—allied to obsessive order."

Cohoon is best known as a creator of gift drawings, particularly for The Tree of Life. She is mostly known for her paintings, but she also composed music.

== Death and legacy ==
Hannah Harrison Cohoon died in Hancock, Massachusetts, on January 7, 1864, and is buried in the family cemetery of the Church.

Sister Alice Smith of Hancock Shaker Village brought four gift drawings to Faith and Edward Deming Andrews, Shaker historians, by 1931. The Andrews organized an exhibit at the Whitney Museum of American Art in 1935. An image of Cohoon's Tree of Life appeared in a December 1945 Antiques magazine article by Edward Deming Andrews. The Andrews used the image for the covers of Visions of Heavenly Sphere and Fruits of the Shaker Tree of Life in 1969 and 1975. The Hancock Shaker Village became a museum in 1960, and sometime after that the Andrews sold Cohoon's drawings and other gift drawings to the museum.

Her Tree of Life drawing was used in 1974 for a UNICEF Christmas postcard to raise funds for the organization. The Whitney Museum of Art held exhibited four of Cohoon's drawings in the "American Folk Painters of Three Centuries" show in 1980. Her works were exhibited at the "Shaker — Masterworks of Utilitarian Design" show at the Katonah Gallery, New York, in 1983.

The director of the Museum of American Folk Art in New York City, Gerard C. Wertkin, said that Cohoon is "considered the pre-eminent Shaker artist" and her works "have become icons of Shaker material culture.

== See also ==
- Cora Helena Sarle, another Shaker watercolor artist
