= Shaker Farm =

- U.S. National Register of Historic Places
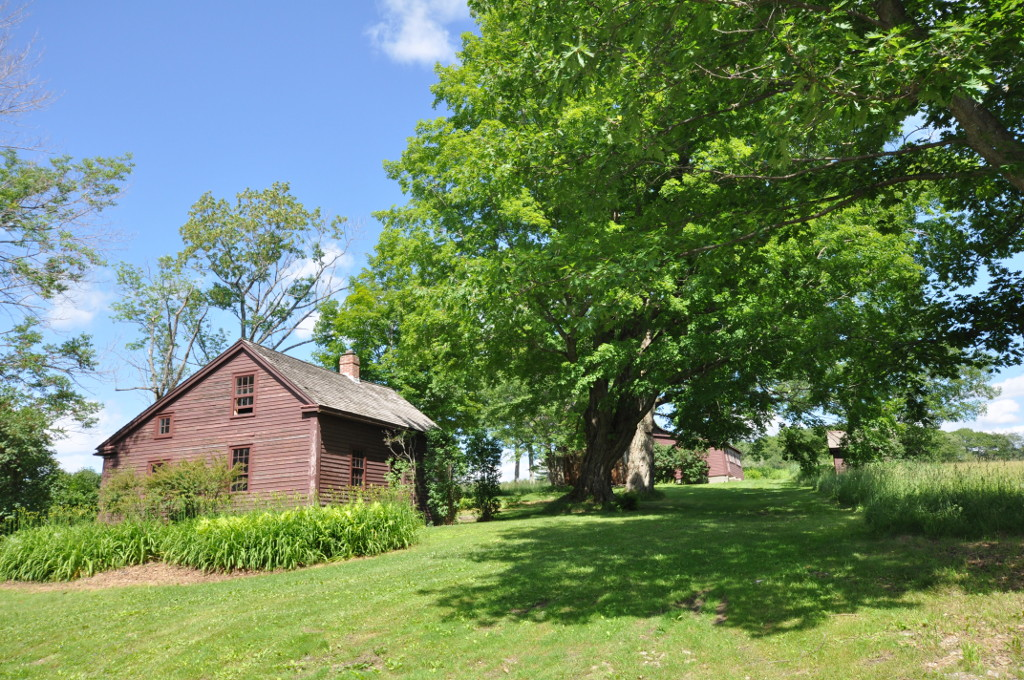

- Location within Massachusetts Location within the United States
- Location: Opposite 1448 Dublin Rd., Richmond, Massachusetts
- Coordinates: 42°22′53″N 73°21′13″W
- Area: 10 acres (4.0 ha)
- Built: 1795
- Architect: Hand, Daniel
- Architectural style: Colonial Revival, Colonial
- NRHP reference No.: 95001198
- Added to NRHP: November 6, 1995

Shaker Farm (also the Edward Deming and Faith Andrews Homestead) is a historic farmstead on Dublin Road in Richmond, Massachusetts. The property is notable as the subject of a book by the Andrewses, The Fruits of the Shaker Tree of Life, in which they document the property's condition and restoration. The farmhouse was built c. 1795 by Daniel Hand of New Lebanon, New York, and exhibits a number of examples of Shaker craftsmanship. The Andrewses acquired the property in 1937, and devoted the rest of their lives to collecting, documenting, and promoting Shaker heritage. The property was listed on the National Register of Historic Places in 1995. As of 1995, the property continues to be owned by Andrews descendants.

== Description and history ==
Shaker Farm is located in a rural setting of geographically central Richmond, on the east side of Dublin Road about midway between Sleepy Hollow and Lenox Roads. The property consists of 10 acres (4.0 ha), primarily open fields, although there are trees around the farmstead. The farmstead includes four buildings: a house, barn, shed, and privy. The house is a 1-1/2 story wood frame structure, with a gabled roof, central chimney, and clapboarded exterior. The rear roof has a lower pitch than the front, giving the house a saltbox profile, although there is architectural evidence it was not always that way. The main facade, which faces south, is three bays wide, with the main entrance at the center. It has a board-and-batten door fastened with wrought iron hinges and latches. The door is not original to the house, but was salvaged from a Shaker house. The interior retains a significant number of original features, such as some wide pine flooring, but these have in part been replaced or augmented by restorative work performed by the Andrewses, often by salvage from other Shaker buildings.

The property the house stands on was part of a land grant made in 1762 to Joseph Dwight. After multiple divisions and resales, the 10-acre parcel was sold to Daniel Hand, who built the house soon afterward. It was purchased in 1937 by Edward Deming Andrews and his wife Faith, with the house in extremely deteriorated condition. They spent the next two years undertaking its restoration, a process documented in The Fruits of the Shaker Tree of Life, which has undergone maintenance and some additional stabilization work since then. The barn, built in the early 19th century, was also restored, and a more modern addition was made to it. The Andrewses were influential in the rediscovery and popularization of the aesthetics of Shaker craftsmanship, and Shaker Farm was featured in a number of magazine articles on the subject.

== See also ==
- National Register of Historic Places listings in Berkshire County, Massachusetts
