= Rebecca Landon =

American Shaker artist

Rebecca Landon (c. 1782 – November 19, 1844) was an American Shaker religious figure, visionary, community leader, and creator of sacred imagery associated with the New Lebanon, New York, Shaker community. She is known for a visionary testimony recorded in 1842 during the Shaker Era of Manifestations and for her association with the drawing Mother's Banner of Love and Comfort (1845), now held by the National Gallery of Art.

== Early life and Shaker affiliation ==
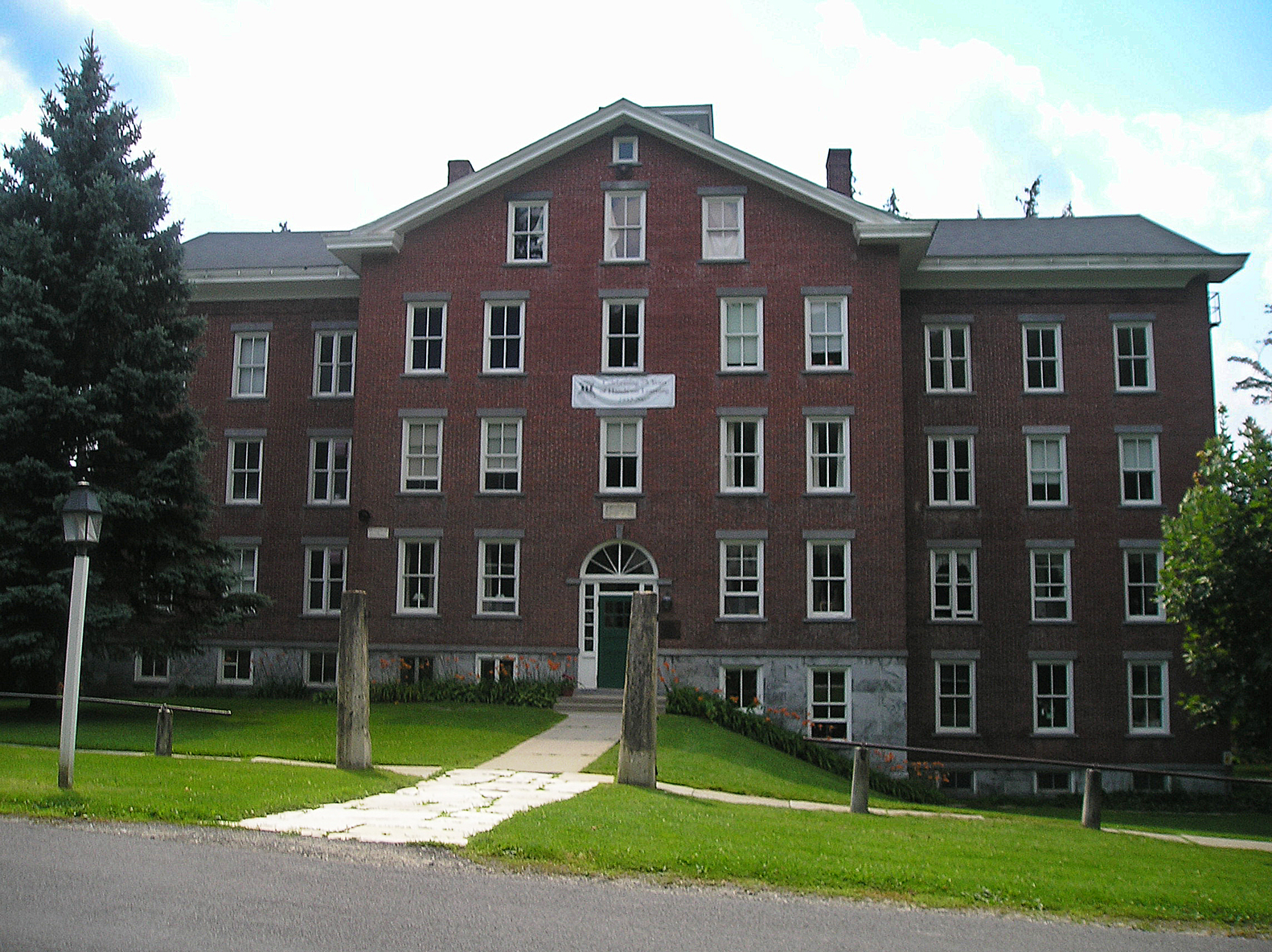
Building one and main dwelling of the Mount Lebanon Shaker Society of New Lebanon, New York

Little documentary evidence survives concerning Rebecca Landon's early life prior to her association with the United Society of Believers in Christ's Second Appearing (Shakers). Shaker records place her long-term residence within the New Lebanon community, also known as the Mount Lebanon Shaker Society, which functioned as a central spiritual, administrative, and publishing center for the movement during the nineteenth century.

Contemporary Shaker records describe Landon as having served for twenty-three years as a "leading Shepherdess" within her order. According to Rufus Bishop's Journal of Daily Events, this role was associated with her long-standing leadership in the New Lebanon community. Shaker historian Daniel W. Patterson identifies Landon as Eldress of the Second Family at Mount Lebanon at the time the banner originated, indicating her senior leadership within that order.

== Visionary Testimony (1842) ==
In April 1842, during the period of heightened visionary activity known as the Era of Manifestations, Landon recorded a detailed testimony describing a nocturnal vision. According to her account, she witnessed the appearance of a luminous female angel holding a book and delivering an extended prophetic message.

Landon reported that two younger Shaker women, described as being "gifted in visions," audibly repeated the angel's words while in a trance state, while Landon herself observed the angel's lips move without hearing the voice directly. One of the witnesses named in the account was Marilla Fairbanks, identified in Shaker records as an Elder Sister at New Lebanon.

The angelic message, said to have lasted approximately two hours, warned of divine judgment, condemned false religion and moral corruption, and called for repentance.

A notable element of the message is its address to the United States, warning the nation that it could not "raise the hand of oppression against thy fellow creatures" without facing divine punishment. Within the historical context of the 1840s, when slavery remained legal in much of the country, scholars have interpreted this passage as an implicit condemnation of slavery consistent with Shaker opposition to human bondage and coercive social systems.

Landon's testimony was later published in The Divine Book of Holy and Eternal Wisdom (1849), a compilation of Shaker revelations edited by Paulina Bates and issued by the United Society at New Lebanon, with printing carried out in Canterbury, New Hampshire.

== Artistic work ==
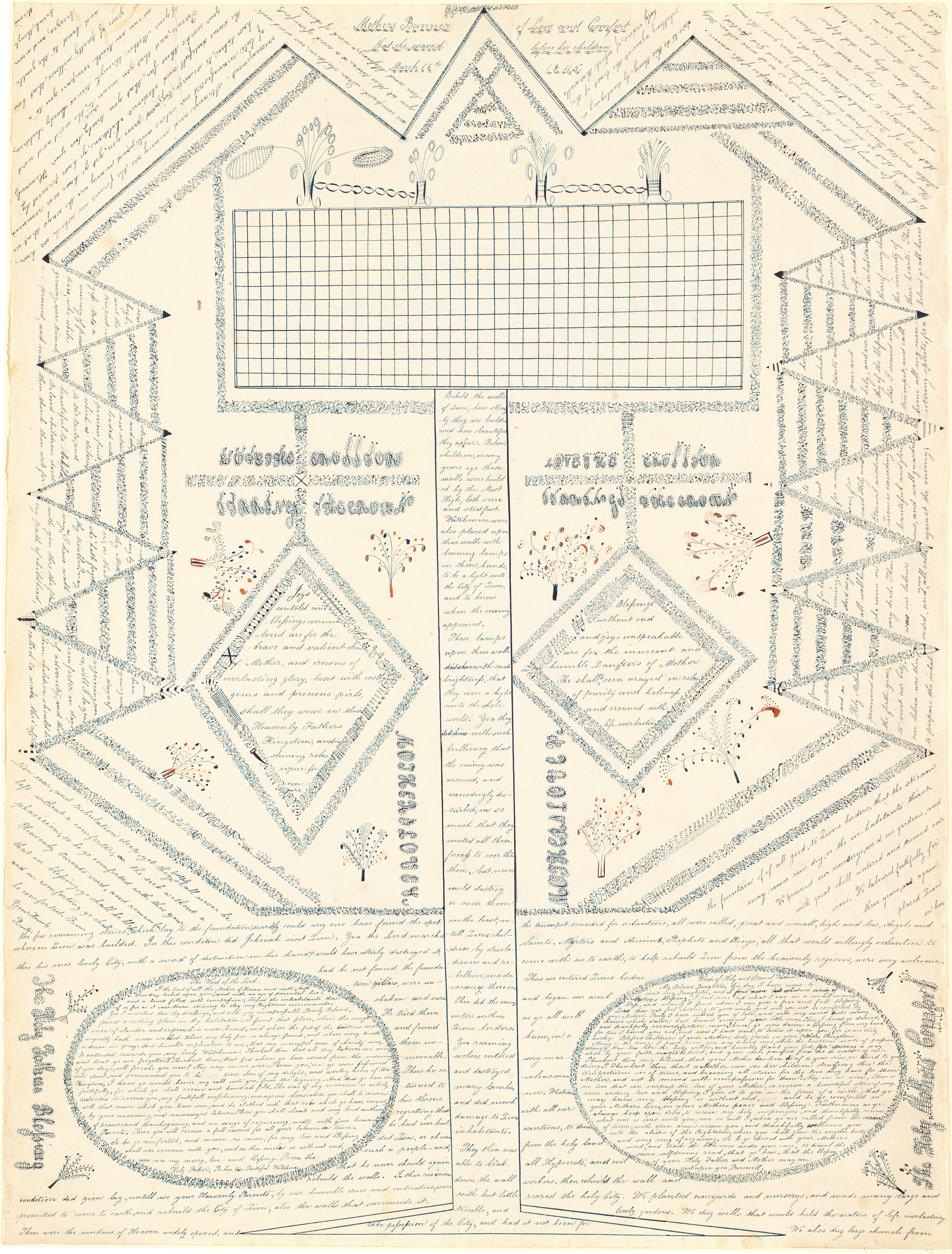
Rebecca Landon, Mother's Banner of Love and Comfort, 1845. (NGA 52975)

Rebecca Landon is associated with Mother's Banner of Love and Comfort (dated March 16, 1845), a symbolic Shaker drawing now held by the National Gallery of Art (NGA 52975). A contemporaneous note indicates that the work was "copied" by Landon. However, as she had died approximately four months earlier, she was not the "mortal instrument" who physically executed the drawing.

Daniel W. Patterson notes that the piece likely originated in the Second Family at Mount Lebanon, where Landon served as Eldress, and that she transmitted or presented the banner to the sister who created it.

This distinction reflects Shaker practices of communal authorship and spiritual mediation, in which visionary authority and artistic execution were not always identical.

By the mid-twentieth century, the drawing was in the collection of Edgar William and Bernice Chrysler Garbisch of New York City. It was subsequently given to the National Gallery of Art as a gift of the Garbisches and was accessioned by 1971. The work was published in the National Gallery's 1974 catalog Recent Acquisitions and Promised Gifts: Sculpture, Drawings, Prints, where it appears as accession number B-25,656. The work was included in the 1970 exhibition Gift of Inspiration: Religious Art of the Shakers at Hancock Shaker Village.

== Death and contemporary assessment ==
Rebecca Landon died on November 19, 1844, at the age of sixty-two, while residing at the Second Family within the New Lebanon Shaker community. Her death followed a brief but severe illness identified in Shaker records as "Black Jaundice".

According to Rufus Bishop's Journal of Daily Events, members of the Shaker Ministry visited Landon at her deathbed. Bishop recorded that when Elder Brother Ebenezer Bishop believed she had died, Landon responded briefly, "Nay, I ain't gone," and sent her love to the church. Her death was formally recorded two days later.

Bishop described Landon as physically frail but credited her with long-standing spiritual leadership, noting her decades-long service as a Shepherdess. He characterized her as influential in "uniting & protecting souls" and emphasized that she was respected within the community without regard to "age, sex, color or condition."
