= Rebecca Cox Jackson =

American writer (1795–1871)

- Born: February 15, 1795; Horntown, Pennsylvania, U.S.
- Died: May 24, 1871 (aged 76); Lebanon, Pennsylvania, U.S.
- Occupations: Founder, Black Shaker Community
- Known for: Shaker Eldress
- Notable work: Gifts of Power: The Writings of Rebecca Cox Jackson, Black Visionary, Shaker Eldress edited by Jean McMahon Humez

Rebecca Cox Jackson (February 15, 1795 – May 24, 1871) was a free Black woman, known for her religious feminism and activism and her writing. Her autobiography was published in 1981 as Gifts of Power: The Writings of Rebecca Cox Jackson, Black Visionary, Shaker Eldress, edited by Jean McMahon Humez.

Jackson worked as a seamstress and cared for her brother's children until her religious awakening in 1830. She wrote that after this awakening, she received divine gifts including healing people, seeing the future, having visions, control over the weather, hearing God's voice, acting as a medium, and learning to read spontaneously. Jackson worked as an itinerant preacher before joining the Shaker movement, which shared her values of egalitarianism and celibacy.

In 1859, Jackson and her protégé and lifelong companion Rebecca Perot founded a Shaker community of Black women in Philadelphia. Jackson's relationship with Perot, which lasted for 35 years until Jackson's death in 1871, has been called "perhaps the most controversial element of Jackson's autobiography".

== Early life ==
Rebecca Cox was born on February 15, 1795, in Horntown, Delaware County, Pennsylvania into a free family. According to autobiographical information, her mother's name was Jane Cox. Her father likely died shortly after her birth. Cox lived with her grandmother for a few years before moving back with her mother and stepfather. By the time she was ten, Cox was living in Philadelphia. She cared for her younger siblings, which may have led to her not having the time to learn to read and write.

After her mother's death, Jackson lived with her widowed brother Joseph Cox, a tanner and elder in the Bethel A.M. E. Church eighteen years older than her. She worked as a seamstress and cared for his four children. By 1830, she had married Samuel S. Jackson and worked as a seamstress until her religious awakening.

== Conversion and early ministry ==
In 1830, Jackson experienced a spiritual awakening in the middle of a thunderstorm. Prior to this experience, she was terrified of thunderstorms. However, she had a revelation that God would protect her and communicate to her during thunderstorms and was afterwards devoted to her religion. Rather than joining a church, she preached in private prayer groups. American Methodist Episcopal bishop Morris Brown went to a meeting she spoke at to stop her, but, after listening to her speak, said, "If ever the Holy Ghost was in any place, it was in that meeting. Let her alone now."

Jackson's brother was a powerful leader in the African Methodist Episcopal Church, so her involvement placed her as his subordinate. After her conversion, she was frustrated that her brother refused to teach her to read and that, when transcribing her religious correspondence, he did not directly copy her words. Her autobiography tells that in 1831, listening to God's voice telling her she could read, she discovered the ability spontaneously.

Jackson became active in the American Methodist Episcopal Holiness and Sanctification Movements. In 1831, Jackson helped lead a praying band, whose members included her husband. Still, her religious work led to her divorce from her husband and separation from her brother. A domestic dispute arose from her choice of celibacy to maintain her covenant with God and pursue her ministry. Samuel threatened physical violence in response to her proclamation. Though violence is not recorded, it may have been present throughout their marriage. Jackson moved out of her brother's house and continued her spiritual journey in the Shaker religion.

Jackson became itinerant preacher in the early 1830s. During this time, she faced religious persecution, with American Methodist Episcopal ministers warning church trustees not to listen to her preaching. In 1837, leaders in Philadelphia's black religious community accused Jackson of heresy. Jackson still found an audience, as Richard Williams notes that in the winter of 1936, she led sixty-nine discussions in Methodist and Baptist congregations and private homes. While in Albany, she became involved with a "Perfectionist" group, The Little Band. When the group observed a Shaker meeting together, Jackson was impressed. In 1843, during the Era of Manifestations, Jackson returned to visit the Shakers for several days with The Little Band.

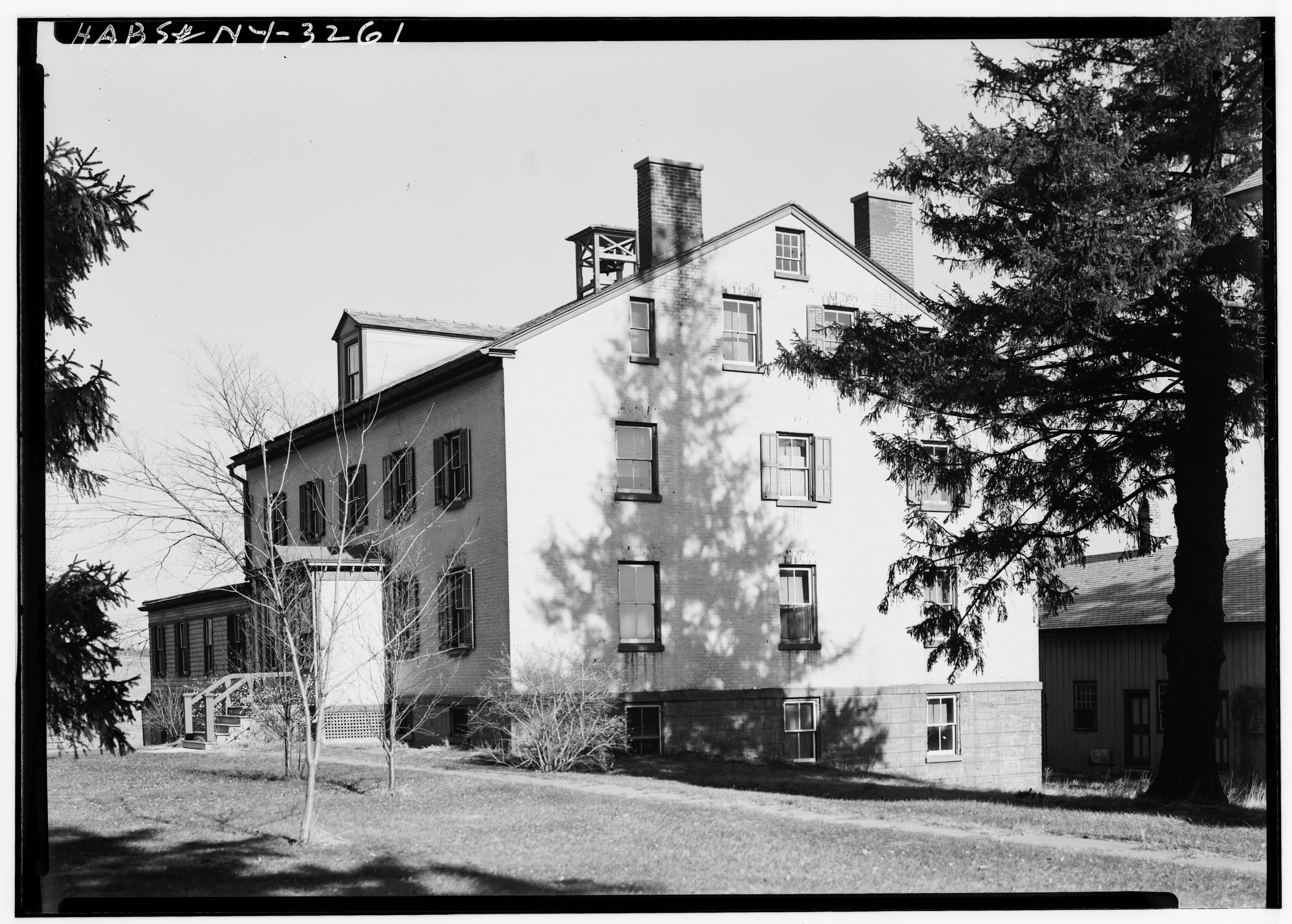
The South Family Dwelling House in Watervliet, where Jackson lived with her lifelong companion Rebecca Perot.

== Work in the Shaker community ==
Jackson had serious health issues, that she said were related to her gifts from God.

In June, 1847, Jackson and her "protégé and lifelong companion" Rebecca Perot, along with other Little Band members, moved to Watervliet, New York, living in the South Family Dwelling House. Jackson shared many of the same values that the Shakers did, but according to Walker, most important to Jackson was that "they believed in celibacy; the only religious group she ever heard of that did". She became a minister in that community. However, the community wanted her to make a pledge to a white Eldress named Mother Paulina Bates in order to be considered a "full member." While Jackson's refusal could be understood through a racial lens, Laurel Bollinger notes, "Jackson does not consider her refusal to submit to the white woman in this way; her relation to God takes priority over any other element in her life." While her frustrations were due to the broader Shaker system, they focused on Bates. In 1850, Jackson's call to minister to Black Americans led to further tensions with Shaker leadership. Jackson and Perot left Watervliet in July, 1851, moving to Philadelphia to try to start a mission. This mission contributed to tensions between Jackson and Bates. Due to the lack of financial or community support, her Philadelphia mission failed.

In 1857, Jackson and Perot returned to Watervliet, where Jackson agreed to take the pledge to Mother Paulina Bates and she was granted a blessing to minister to people herself. While there, she again fell ill, "as if her body itself refuses to submit to the Eldress." After recovering, Jackson became more active in acquiring support for her Philadelphia mission. Eldress Paulina claimed that it was the wish of Mother Ann that Jackson return to Philadelphia to start a mission. Jackson received her commission from the Shaker elders on October 5, 1858 and returned to Philadelphia three days later. In 1859, Jackson established a Shaker group in Philadelphia primarily ministering to Black women. This urban group was unique within Shaker history. Jackson continued as Eldress of her family of Shakers in a large house on Erie Street until her death in 1871. The community consisted of between twelve and twenty members, most of whom were black and female. Other Black Shakers in the area also gathered there for services.

== Death ==
Jackson died of a stroke on May 24, 1871, at Lebanon. She was buried at the Shaker's Central Ministry at Mount Lebanon.

After Jackson's death, Perot took her name in memory of her companion.

== Womanist theology and feminism ==
Motherhood was an important concept to Jackson, as it was an important aspect of being a woman that she wanted to embrace. While she never had children and wanted to remain celibate, she spoke of a spiritual maternity, or of being a mother figure for people in a spiritual way. Jackson was led by her religious beliefs in everything she did; as Walker stated, "Jackson felt compelled always to follow her own inner voice or 'invisible lead' ". She remained at this settlement until her death in 1871, where her "name and position were taken up by her life-long companion Rebecca Perot". The Black Shaker community in Philadelphia continued to exist as late as 1908.

Jackson's feminism was very much rooted in her religiosity. According to Gloria T. Hull, who reviewed Jackson's autobiography after it was discovered in 1981, "Jackson's [spiritual] gifts helped her identity, dignity, self-confidence, courage, and real skills to balance the skewed power dynamics a woman like her survives against in [America]". The fact that she joined the Shakers alone shows her feminism, as "the Shakers believe in a dual, Mother-Father godhead". Jackson saw great importance of the potential of women to bear children. She and other religious figures used the fact that her community acknowledged the importance of pregnancy and creating life as a strategy to combat the prominence of male symbolism in religion and spirituality, as well as in leadership roles. Jackson's spirituality was definitely crucial to her accepting her position as a woman and seeing the power in that "Jackson's matricentric theology has enabled her to accept first the feminine and finally the maternal in herself. Her narrative explores both daughterly and maternal subject positions, but her quest for agency separates both from biological limitations". Her feminism manifested itself in her spirituality, which allowed her to believe she had power coming from her marginalized position. According to Kimberly R. Connor in her discussion of Alice Walker's review of Jackson's autobiography, "Jackson's choice to embrace a 'marginal identity' casts her as an actual example of one who lived a womanist lifestyle in Walker's terms and her own brand of spirituality and Christian doctrine closely resembles beliefs Walker advocates for a womanist theology...but the blending of the influences of race and gender that characterize a contemporary womanist perspective as defined by Walker are Jackson's own unique innovation". Around this time she met her lifelong companion Rebecca Perot. Both women continued to have visions, even appearing in each other's visions; Perot said in one of her visions that Jackson was "crowned king and me crowned queen of Africa", while Jackson saw the two of them "unit[ing] in the covenant". The two women were together for thirty-five years, until Jackson's death. She was able to reframe a power dynamic where she initially did not benefit, into a situation where she created her own path and future; because she felt God was paving a way for her, nothing was impossible for her.

== Legacy ==
In the 1840s, Jackson began writing a spiritual autobiography, which may have been based on earlier journal entries. In it, she recorded visionary experiences, dreams, and supernatural gifts. The autobiography commences in 1830 and ends in 1864, seven years before her death. Based on two manuscripts of the autobiography, Jean McMahon Humez compiled Gifts of Power: The Writings of Rebecca Cox Jackson, Black Visionary, Shaker Eldress, which was published in 1981. The autobiography describes her womanist theology and feminism, visions, and other religious experiences, as well as her accounts of her experiences of sexism, racism, and discrimination.

According to scholar Henry Louis Gates, Jr. in his book The Signifying Monkey: A Theory of African-American Literary Criticism, Alice Walker wrote him that Gifts of Power was the first book she read after finishing her novel The Color Purple and that Walker's dedication in The Color Purple ("To the spirit") draws from her reaction to Jackson's autobiography. Gates states that the spirit in Walker's dedication is the same spirit that taught Jackson how to read and makes parallels between the literacy of Jackson and Celie, Walker's protagonist in The Color Purple.

Jackson's celibacy and relationship with Perot have led to modern considerations of her as a queer woman. Notably, in a May 2022 Q Spirit post, Kittredge Cherry described Jackson as "the first black queer spiritual narrative in American history."

In 2018, artist Cauleen Smith created a work entitled Space Station: Two Rebeccas, referencing Jackson and Perot. In the installation, two scratch films are projected onto disco balls. Jackson is also a subject of Smith's works Pilgrim (2017) and Sojourner (2018).

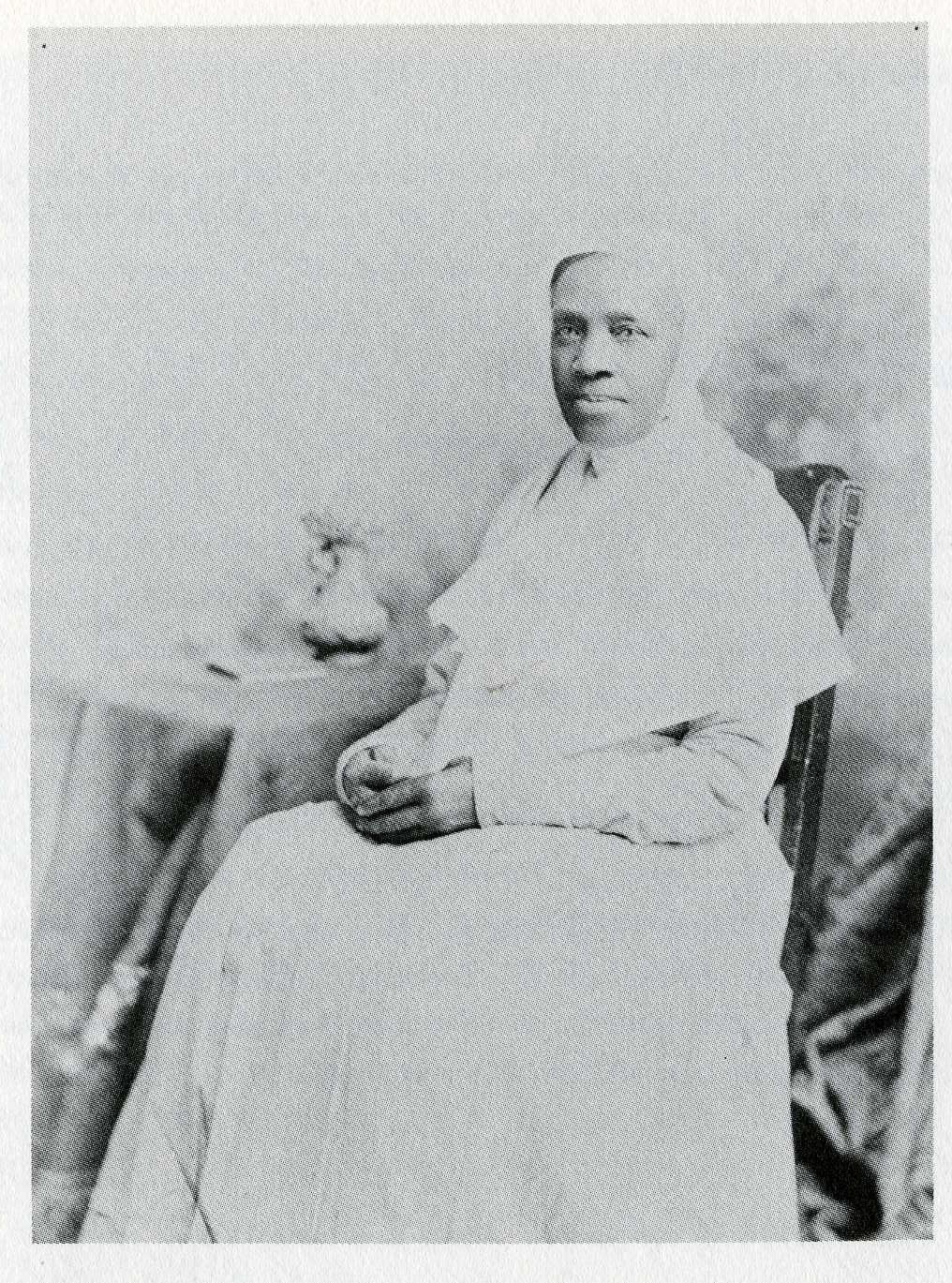
Undated photograph of Rebecca Perot, Rebecca Cox Jackson's partner of 35 years. No known image of Jackson exists.

== Relationship with Rebecca Perot ==
Shortly after the end of Jackson's marriage to Samuel S. Jackson and her separation from her brother Joseph Cox, she met her lifelong companion Rebecca Perot. They lived together for over thirty-one years. The pair lived together in the South Family Dwelling House at Watervliet. It is not clear whether their relationship was romantic or not, since Jackson followed the Shaker practice of celibacy, but as Laurel Bollinger in her article on maternity and authority explained, "Jackson's relationship with Perot has been perhaps the most controversial element of Jackson's autobiography". Alice Walker stated that "These two women lived together, ate together, travelled together, prayed together and slept together until the end of Jackson's life some thirty-odd years after they met".

== Works ==
- Gifts of Power: The Writings of Rebecca Jackson, Black Visionary, Shaker Eldress edited with an introduction by Jean McMahom Humez. Amherst, MA: University of Massachusetts Press, 1981. ISBN 0870235656.

== Works cited ==
- Bassard, Katherine Clay (1991-01-18), "Rituals of Desire: Spirit, Culture, and Sexuality in the Writings of Rebecca Cox Jackson", Spiritual Interrogations: Culture, Gender, and Community in Early African American Women's Writing, Princeton University Press, pp. 108–126, ISBN 978-1-4008-2259-1
- Bollinger, Laurel (1 January 2000). "'A Mother in the Deity': Maternity and Authority in the Nineteenth-Century African-American Spiritual Narrative". Women's Studies. 29 (3): 357–382. doi:10.1080/00497878.2000.9979318. ISSN 0049-7878.
- Connor, Kimberly Rae (1995). "Womanist Parables in Gifts of Power: The Autobiography of Rebecca Cox Jackson". A/B: Auto/Biography Studies. 10 (2): 21–38. doi:10.1080/08989575.1995.10815068. ISSN 0898-9575.
- Cuffee, Sallie M. (Fall 2016). "Reconstructing Subversive Moral Discourses in the Spiritual Autobiographies of Nineteenth-Century African American Preaching Women". Journal of Feminist Studies in Religion. 32 (2): 45–62. doi:10.2979/jfemistudreli.32.2.05. ISSN 1553-3913.
- French, Kara M. (2021), "Identities of Sexual Restraint", Against Sex: Identities of Sexual Restraint in Early America, Chapel Hill: University of North Carolina Press, pp. 67–71, ISBN 979-8-89085-957-0
- Gates, Henry Louis, Jr. (1989). The Signifying Monkey: A Theory of African-American Literary Criticism. New York: Oxford University Press. ISBN 019506075X.
- Haynes, Rosetta R. (2011). "Movers and Shakers: Itinerancy and the Search for Community and Identity in the Narratives of Zilpha Elaw and Rebecca Jackson". Radical Spiritual Motherhood: Autobiography and Empowerment in Nineteenth-Century African American Women. LSU Press. pp. 115–144. ISBN 978-0-8071-3820-5.
- Hull, Gloria T. (Autumn 1982). "Review: Rebecca Cox Jackson and the Uses of Power". Tulsa Studies in Women's Literature. 1 (2): 203–209. doi:10.2307/464081. ISSN 0732-7730. JSTOR 464081.
- Trollinger, Rebekah (2022). "Rebecca Jackson and the Problem of Celibacy". Religion and American Culture. 32 (3): 375–404. doi:10.1017/rac.2023.1. ISSN 1052-1151.
- Walker, Alice (1981). "Review of Gifts of Power: The Writings of Rebecca Cox Jackson (1795-1871), Black Visionary, Shaker Eldress, by J. M. Humez". The Black Scholar. 12 (5): 64–67. doi:10.1080/00064246.1981.11414210. JSTOR 41066844.
