= Paulina Bates =

Shaker eldress and theological writer (1806–1884)

Paulina Bates (1806–1884), also known as Mother Paulina Bates, was a Shaker eldress and theological writer associated with the Watervliet, New York community during the mid-nineteenth century. She is best known as the author of The Divine Book of Holy and Eternal Wisdom (1849), a major visionary text of the Shaker Era of Manifestations. Modern scholarship identifies Bates as a significant female theological authority within nineteenth-century Shakerism.

== Early life and Shaker affiliation ==
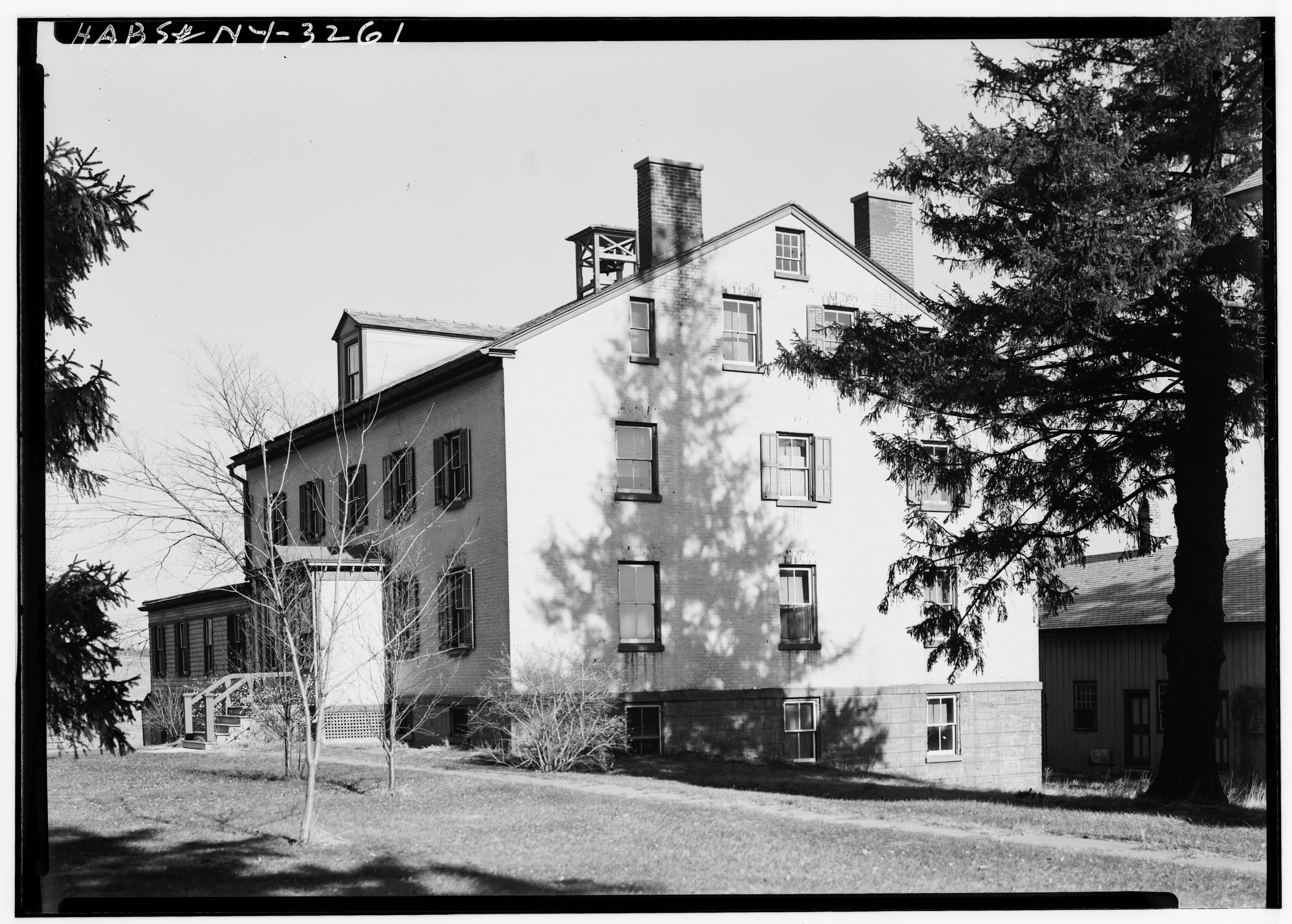
The South Family Dwelling House in Watervliet, New York.

Paulina Bates was born in 1806 and joined the United Society of Believers in Christ's Second Appearing (Shakers) in the 1820s. By the 1840s she had risen to leadership within the Watervliet community, serving as South Family eldress.

Shaker communities were organized under a dual-gender system of governance in which male and female leaders held parallel offices. Half of all positions were reserved for women, reflecting Shaker belief that God embodied both male and female principles.

== Role in the Era of Manifestations ==
Bates was active during the Shaker Era of Manifestations (c. 1837–1850), a period marked by visionary activity, spirit communications, and renewed theological development. She was described as a prominent spirit-medium during the 1840s and later served as editor or author of a substantial theological compilation of spirit messages.

In 1849 she published The Divine Book of Holy and Eternal Wisdom: Revealing the Word of God, Out of Whose Mouth Goeth a Sharp Sword. The work systematized visionary revelations and elaborated Shaker teachings concerning the dual male–female nature of God and the millennial role of Mother Ann Lee.

== Possible hymn authorship ==
Paulina Bates has been identified as a likely author of the Shaker hymn “Come to Zion” (Later Song No. 35). According to Daniel W. Patterson in The Shaker Spiritual, a manuscript note indicates that the song was written in March 1861 by a member of the North Family at New Lebanon. Patterson notes that the only individual with matching initials residing in that family at the time was Paulina Bates.

The hymn reflects themes characteristic of Shaker devotional literature, including spiritual healing, repentance, and appeal to divine mercy.

== Conflict and reconciliation with Rebecca Cox Jackson ==
Paulina Bates appears prominently in the history of Rebecca Cox Jackson (1795–1871), the most prominent African American Shaker of the nineteenth century.

Jackson joined the Shakers in 1847 and lived with Rebecca Perot at the South Family in Watervliet, New York, until 1851. When Jackson felt called to resume preaching and leave Watervliet for missionary work in Philadelphia, Family Eldress Paulina Bates opposed the decision. Jackson and Perot departed despite this opposition.

In Jackson's later writings, the conflict with Bates is described in spiritual and symbolic terms. Jackson frameShd the dispute as a tension between inward divine leading and institutional authority. Humez notes that Jackson's dream narratives during the mid-1850s linked her struggle with the eldress to racially discriminatory treatment of Black converts at Watervliet and to broader antebellum racial hierarchies. Humez further suggests that the fact that Bates was a white woman in a position of authority over Jackson may have intensified the symbolic and emotional dimensions of the conflict.

Shaker records characterized Jackson's departure as having “abandoned her home in Zion” and acting independently in “her own gift.” From the perspective of Watervliet leadership, the refusal to authorize her departure reflected ongoing efforts to preserve communal separation from “the world” during a period of post–Era of Manifestations consolidation.

The relationship was not permanently severed. Jackson and Perot returned to Watervliet in 1857. According to later accounts, Eldress Paulina communicated that it was the wish of Mother Ann that Jackson return to Philadelphia to establish a Shaker society there. Jackson and Perot departed again in 1858 and founded a racially integrated Shaker meeting in Philadelphia in 1859.

== Later life and legacy ==
Bates continued in Shaker leadership through the later nineteenth century and died in 1884.

Her Divine Book remains one of the most extensive visionary theological texts authored by a Shaker woman and has been studied in discussions of communal religion, spiritualism, and gender theology in nineteenth-century America.
