= Era of Manifestations =

Religious event (1837 to the mid-1850s)

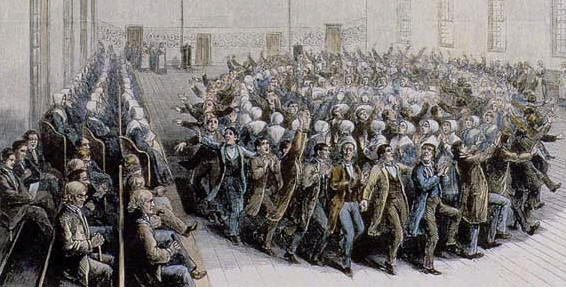
Shakers dancing, engraving, c. 1840

The Era of Manifestations was a period from 1837 to the mid-1850s when Shakers came under a spiritual revival marked by visions and ecstatic experiences among the followers. They expressed their visions in song, dance and drawings.

== Overview ==
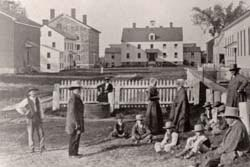
Watervliet Shaker village, Albany, New York, c. 1870, Courtesy of Shaker Heritage Society

The Shaker movement was at its height between 1820 and 1860. It was at this time that the sect had its most members, and the period was considered its "golden age". It had expanded from New England to the Midwestern states of Indiana, Kentucky and Ohio. It was during this period that it became known for its furniture design and craftsmanship. In the late 1830s a spiritual revivalism, the Era of Manifestations was born. It was also known as the "period of Mother's work", for the spiritual revelations that were passed from the late Mother Ann Lee.

== Spiritual revelations ==
The Era of Manifestations began at Watervliet, New York, in 1837 and soon spread throughout Shaker society. For instance, The Era of Manifestations, also called "Mother Ann's Work", was a part of Shaker life in New Lebanon, New York, and Hancock, Massachusetts. Ann Lee's followers testified that she had many "spiritual gifts," including visions, prophecy, healing hands, and "the power of God" in her touch. The Shakers appreciated the revival tradition and brought those practices into Shaker worship.

The wonderful and almost incredible openings of light and truth pertaining to this and the external spiritual world, and which address themselves almost exclusively to the external man, by sensuous facts and physical demonstrations, and which, in former times and other ages, were suppressed and condemned, as the effect of unlawful communings with the powers of darkness, are now being received with joy and gladness by thousands of person, as proof of a telegraphic communication established between the two worlds; and no more to be disputed or doubted than is the existence of that marvelous submarine telegraphic cable that connects the Eastern and Western continents.

According to Shaker tradition, heavenly spirits came to earth, bringing visions, often giving them to young Shaker women, who danced, whirled, spoke in tongues, and interpreted these visions through their drawings and dancing. The immense spirituality expressed through visions and spiritual inspiration, with periodic revivals of enthusiastic worship, revitalized their meetings.

Children told of visits to cities in the spirit realm and brought messages from Mother Ann to the community. Members had visions, spoke in tongues, and experienced trance states. In 1841, a spiritual message was perceived to inaugurate the "sweeping gift," or spiritual cleansing of the village. Other messages led the Shaker Ministry to outlaw the use of pork, tea, and coffee, causing dissension rather than the union Shakers valued.

In the effort to "purify" society, some believers were expelled by visionists. At Canaan, New York, a sister recalled that they "scorched" some sluggards into leaving. In other locations, members who appeared blameless were forced to leave without any revealed infraction.

In 1842, due to these unprecedented spiritual messages being received, the Ministry decided to bar the public from Shaker worship. The same year, Shakers set aside sacred places in each community, with names like Holy Mount and Mount Sinai, for "mountain meetings" or "mountain feasts" held spring and fall. Other revelations resulted in publishing visionary Philemon Stewart's A Holy, Sacred and Divine Roll and Book.

Initially, the period had an effect of strengthening spiritual fervor and helped them to maintain their Shaker principles of simplicity, utility and honesty. The spiritual manifestations were particularly embraced by the younger members of the sect. Over time, though, the older members were increasingly disenchanted. In 1845 the sect revised their guiding edicts, the Millennial Laws, making them stricter. The laws dictated household and life practices, such as limiting mirror size and defining the allowed color of bed linens. After the revision of laws, some "believers" left the Shakers.

== Gift drawings ==
Several pieces of art were created as part of the manifestation in New Lebanon, New York, and Hancock, Massachusetts. These were called "gift drawings" and depicted visions received by the Shakers during this time.

Shaker founders and early leaders had often preached about heavenly treasures greatly to be desired. Never before, however, had Shakers dared to picture these heavenly treasures. Never before had Believers seen with their eyes the close formal resemblance between the things of eternity and the things of time. The subject matter and form of the instruments' images had been prohibited for many years as a threat to the purity of the sect. But a celestial content tempered and made useful this potentially radical art.

— Spiritual Spectacles: Vision and Image in Mid-Nineteenth-Century Shakerism.

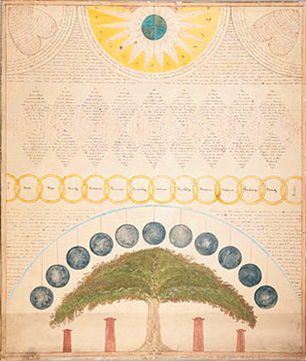
Unknown artist, Shaker gift drawing, mid-19th century

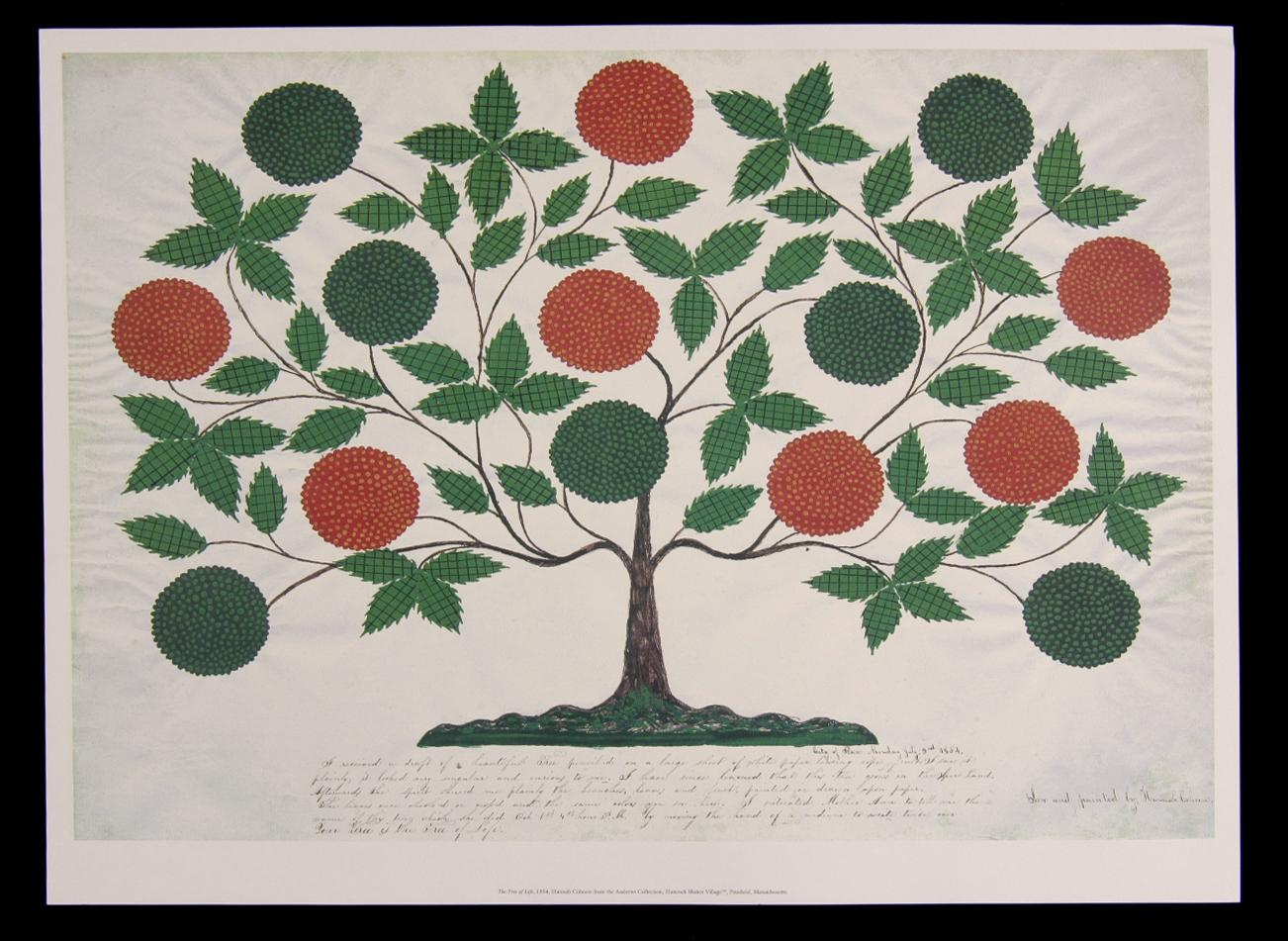
Hannah Cohoon, The Tree of Life, 1854

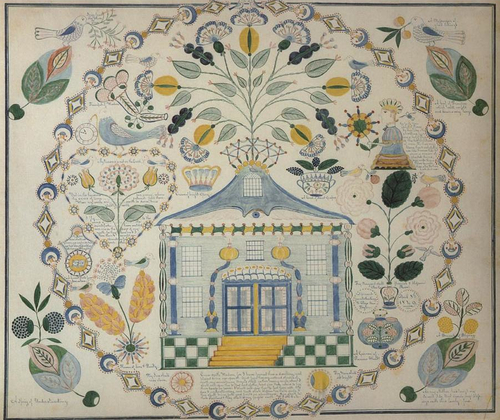
Polly Ann Reed, A present from Mother Lucy to Eliza Ann Taylor, 1851

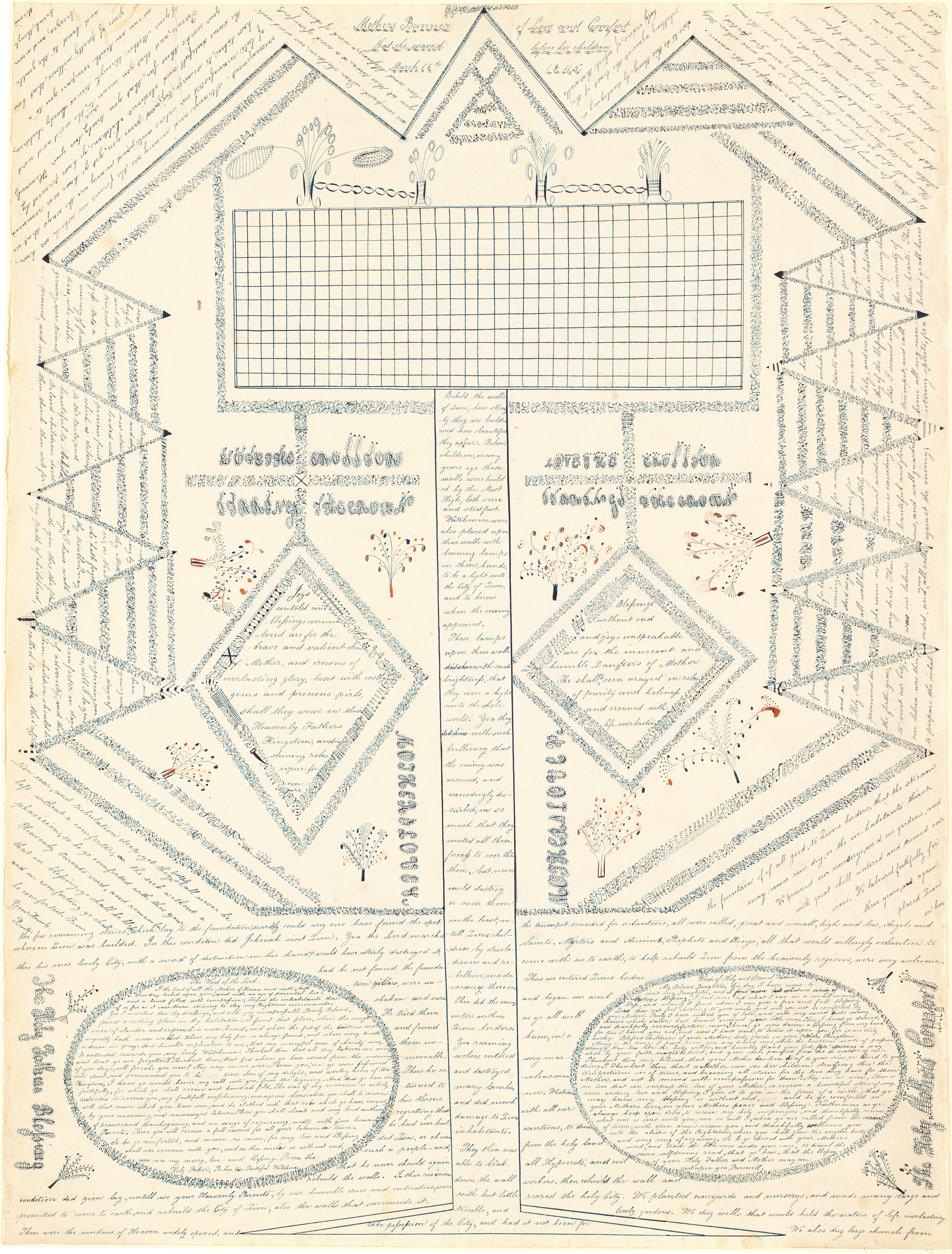
Rebecca Landon, Mother's Banner of Love and Comfort, 1845, NGA 52975

They were made with "painstaking precision" using watercolors or transparent inks. They generally included many small emblems, considered "wildly extravagant by Shaker standards," such as treasure chests, heavenly mansions, golden chariots, flowers and fruits. and included written messages of friendship or reverence, with calligraphic intricacies, resembling fine lacework. Generally, works would not be signed by the artist.

The tree of life has become an icon to represent Shakers. Some of these "drawings" are now part of the American Folk Art Museum collection. Key artists from the Shaker community were Hannah Cohoon, Polly Collins and Joseph Wicker; others include Rebecca Landon, Sarah Bates and Polly Anne Reed. The Era of Manifestations ended when Shaker community members became embarrassed by the "emotional excesses and mystical expressions of this period."
