= Faith Andrews =

American historian

Faith Elizabeth Young Andrews (September 9, 1896 – July 6, 1990) was an American scholar of the United Society of Believers in Christ's Second Appearing, best known as the Shakers.

== Biography ==
=== Early life and education ===
Faith Elizabeth Young was born in 1896, in Pittsfield, Massachusetts. She was an only child, and her parents divorced when she was less than a year old, an unusual practice for the period; she later recalled having "quite a severe childhood". She was raised Episcopalian.

Her family did not support her attaining higher education, but they agreed to allow her to attend secretarial school at Berkshire Business College, which she pursued despite her interest in more advanced studies.

In 1921, Faith married Edward Deming Andrews, with whom she would also build an extensive professional collaboration.

=== Career ===
In 1923, Faith Young Andrews and her husband visited the nearby Shaker community of Hancock, Massachusetts, to purchase some bread. That initial visit prompted a lifelong research interest in the monastic sect. She became considered an authority on Shaker arts and culture.

In collaboration with her husband, Faith wrote many articles about the Shakers as well as several books, beginning with The Community Industries of the Shakers (1932). The Andrews became close with many members of the sect, enabling their efforts to record and preserve Shaker culture.

She also, with her husband, was an extensive collector of Shaker furniture and other objects, from artwork to tools. Their collection of Shaker furniture at one point became the largest of its kind. The first major exhibition of their collection was held in 1932 at the Berkshire Museum. From there, she and Edward curated the Shaker Handicrafts show at the Whitney Museum three years later. Her work helped establish Shakerism as an important movement within American culture.

In addition to her efforts as a researcher, Andrews worked in school administration, as an actuary, and for the Women's City Club of New York.

Faith was predeceased by her husband in 1964. After his death, she published several books — Religion in Wood (1966), Visions of the Heavenly Sphere (1969), and the memoir Fruits of the Shaker Tree of Life (1975) — all of which she co-credited to Edward posthumously.

=== Death and legacy ===
Faith Andrews died in 1990, in Pittsfield, at age 93. Her collection resides with various institutions, including Yale University, in New Haven, Connecticut, and the Henry Francis du Pont Winterthur Museum, in Winterthur, Delaware. The Andrews' final book, Masterpieces of Shaker Furniture, was published posthumously in 1999.
