= Edward Deming Andrews =

American historian, educator, and authority on Shakerism

- Andrews c. 1930s
- Born: March 6, 1894; Pittsfield, Massachusetts, U.S.
- Died: June 6, 1964 (aged 70); Pittsfield, Massachusetts, U.S.
- Education: Amherst College (BA); Yale University (PhD)
- Occupations: Historian, educator, curator
- Employer: Scarborough Day School
- Known for: Authority on Shakerism
- Spouse: Faith Young (m. 1921)
- Children: 2

Edward Deming Andrews (March 6, 1894 – June 6, 1964) was an American historian, educator, curator, and preeminent authority on the United Society of Believers in Christ's Second Appearing, best known as the Shakers.

== Biography ==
Born into a working-class family in Pittsfield, Massachusetts, Andrews received a BA from Amherst College in 1916 and a PhD in education from Yale University in 1930. He taught high-school English and social studies from 1920 to 1927 and worked as curator of history at the New York State Museum from 1931 to 1933. Andrews' interest in Shakerism began in 1923, and he received a Guggenheim Fellowship in American history in 1937 to advance his research into Shaker material culture.

From 1941 to 1956, Andrews taught at Scarborough Day School, in Scarborough-on-Hudson, New York, where he served as dean and history department chair. He frequently corresponded with Thomas Merton. The Winterthur Museum, Garden and Library, in Winterthur, Delaware, holds his collection of manuscripts and published materials concerning Shakerism. This collection was the subject of a monograph by E. Richard McKinstry, The Edward Deming Andrews Memorial Shaker Collection (Garland, 1987).

Andrews died in Pittsfield in 1964. His wife and research collaborator, Faith Andrews (née Young), completed and posthumously published several of his monographs on Shakerism. The couple had married in 1921 and had two children together.

== Publications ==
Andrews authored nine books on the subject of Shakerism, including the following titles (some posthumously published):

- Andrews, Edward (1932). The Community Industries of the Shakers. State University of New York Press. ISBN 9780882780054. LCCN 33028028.
- Andrews, Edward; Andrews, Faith (1937). Shaker Furniture: The Craftsmanship of an American Communal Sect. Yale University Press. LCCN 37006514.
- Andrews, Edward (1940). The Gift to Be Simple: Songs, Dances and Rituals of the American Shakers. New York: J. J. Augustin. LCCN 40030330.
- Andrews, Edward (1953). The People Called Shakers: A Search for the Perfect Society. Oxford University Press. LCCN 53009181.
- Andrews, Edward (1954). The Shaker Order of Christmas. Oxford University Press. LCCN 54012701.
- Andrews, Edward (1961). The Hancock Shakers: The Shaker Community at Hancock, Massachusetts, 1780–1960. Shaker Community. LCCN 85114831.
- Andrews, Edward Deming; Andrews, Faith (1966). Religion in Wood: A Book of Shaker Furniture. Indiana University Press. ISBN 9780253173607. OCLC 837330358.
- Andrews, Edward Deming; Andrews, Faith (1969). Visions of the Heavenly Sphere: A Study in Shaker Religious Art. University Press of Virginia. OCLC 55920.
- Andrews, Edward Deming; Andrews, Faith (1999). Masterpieces of Shaker Furniture: A Book of Shaker Furniture. Dover Publications. OCLC 42022369.
