= Shaker communities =

Settlements of the Shakers sect of Christianity

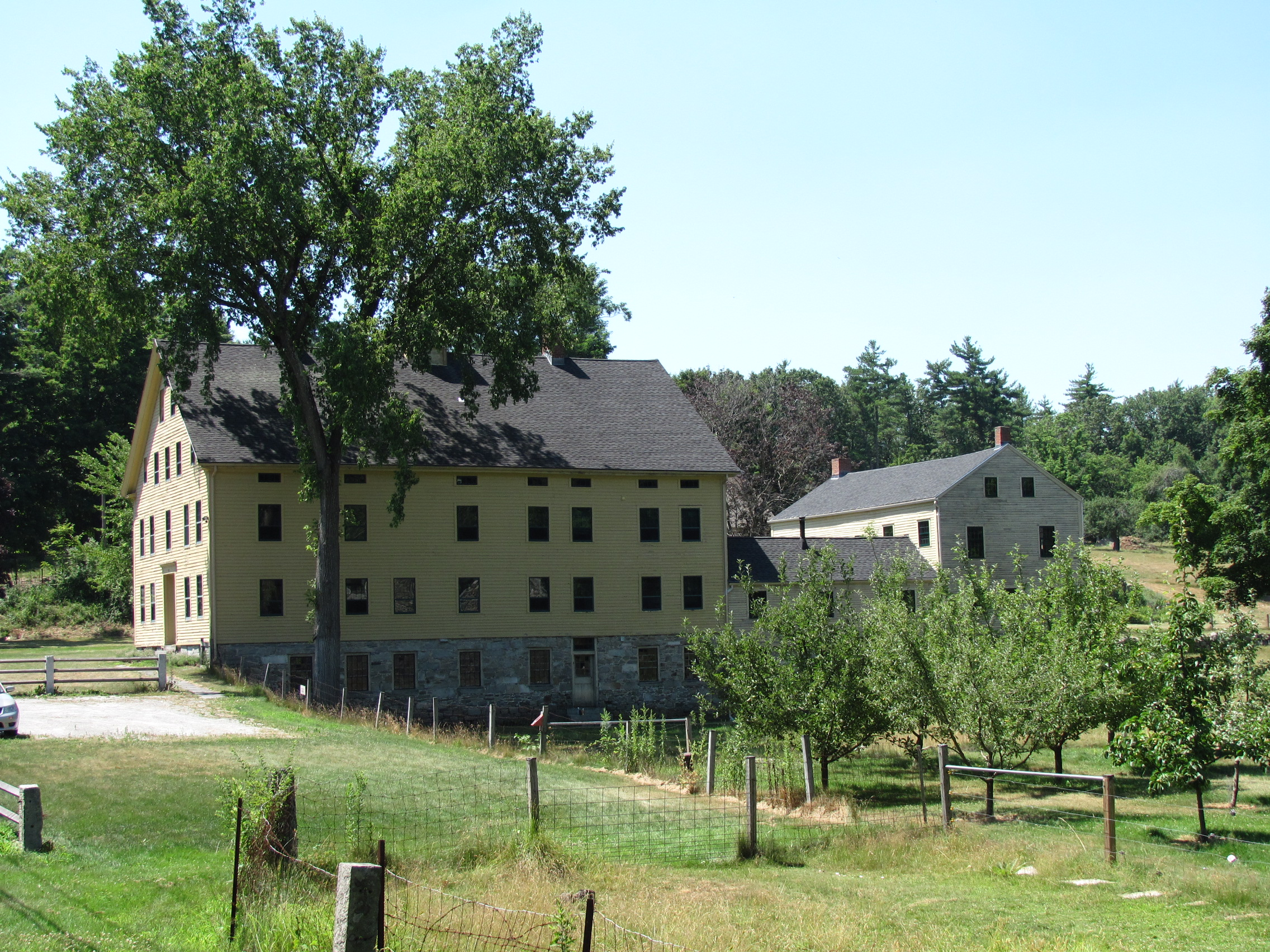
South Family Building, Harvard Shaker Village, Massachusetts

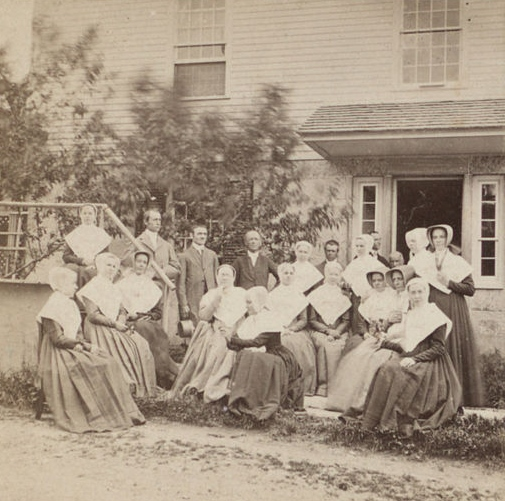
James E. Irving (1818-1901), Photograph of a group of Shakers - single image

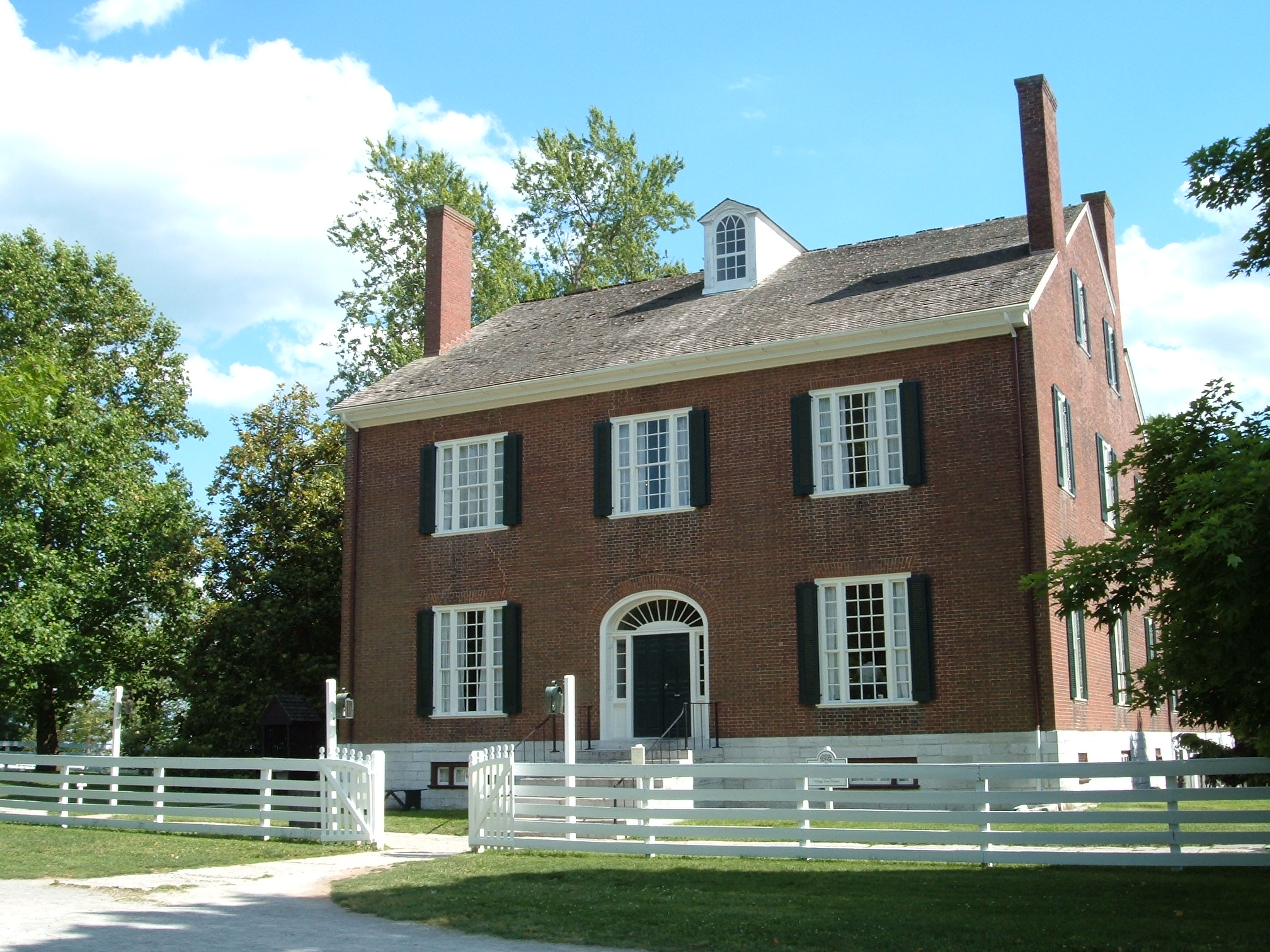
Trustees Office, Shakertown, Pleasant Hill, Kentucky

The Shakers are a sect of Christianity which practices celibacy, communal living, confession of sin, egalitarianism, and pacifism. After starting in England, it is thought that these communities spread into the cotton towns of North West England. The Shakers left England for the English colonies in North America in 1774. As they gained converts, the Shakers established numerous communities in the late-18th century through the entire 19th century. The first villages organized in Upstate New York and the New England states, and, through Shaker missionary efforts, Shaker communities appeared in the Midwestern states. Communities of Shakers were governed by area bishoprics and within the communities individuals were grouped into "family" units and worked together to manage daily activities. By 1836 eighteen major, long-term societies were founded, comprising some sixty families, along with a failed commune in Indiana. Many smaller, short-lived communities were established over the course of the 19th century, including two failed ventures into the Southeastern United States and an urban community in Philadelphia, Pennsylvania. The Shakers peaked in population by the 1840s and early 1850s, with a membership between 4,000 and 9,000. Growth in membership began to stagnate by the mid 1850s. In the turmoil of the American Civil War and subsequent Industrial Revolution, Shakerism went into severe decline. As the number of living Shakers diminished, Shaker communes were disbanded or otherwise ceased to exist. Some of their buildings and sites have become museums, and many are historic districts under the National Register of Historic Places. The only active community is Sabbathday Lake Shaker Village in Maine, which is composed of at least three active members.

== The first Shaker societies ==
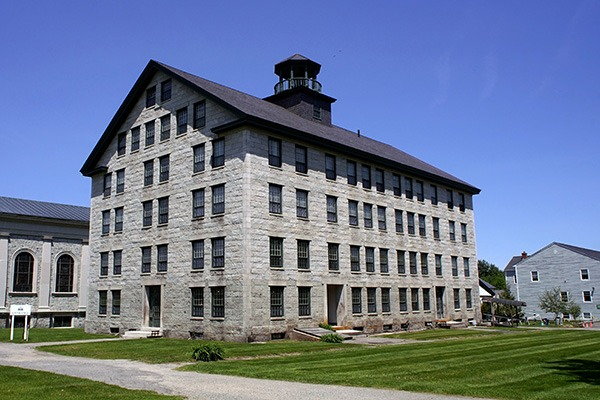
The Great Stone Dwelling, Enfield Shaker Village, New Hampshire

The first Shaker community was established north of Albany, and was first called "Niskayuna", a rendering of the Indian name for the land. Later the town they were in was officially named Watervliet. That part of the town of Watervliet is now in the town of Colonie (since 1895), and the name Watervliet is now limited to the city of Watervliet (1896). In addition, Niskayuna is now the name of a town to the northwest. This has led to some confusion, because many historical accounts refer to them as the Niskayuna Shakers, while others refer to them as Watervliet Shakers. The Watervliet Shaker Historic District is where Mother Ann Lee was buried.

By 1780, the missionary work of the Shakers had attracted many new converts. An extensive series of trips throughout New England from 1781 through 1783 brought in followers across the entire region. Converts began appearing in New Lebanon and Canaan, New York; Hancock, Pittsfield, Richmond, Ashfield, Harvard, and Shirley, Massachusetts; and the states of Connecticut, New Hampshire, and Maine (then part of Massachusetts), among other locations.

In 1784, Ann Lee and her brother both died, leaving James Whittaker to lead the faith. By 1787, he too had died, and Joseph Meacham assumed the role as leader. Meacham appointed Lucy Wright of Pittsfield to co-lead, and under their auspices they organized a central village in New Lebanon, as well as organizing the original settlement of Watervliet. By 1790, the Hancock Village was also organized. After the formation of the New Lebanon, Watervliet, and Hancock communities, within three years nine more communities would organize in Massachusetts, Connecticut, New Hampshire, and Maine.

== Settlement growth ==
The Shakers built more than 20 settlements that attracted at least 20,000 converts over the next century. Strict believers in celibacy, Shakers acquired their members through conversion, indenturing children, and adoption of orphans. Some children, such as Isaac N. Youngs, came to the Shakers when their parents joined, then grew up to become faithful members as adults.

As their communities grew, women and men shared leadership of the Shaker communities. Women preached and received revelations as the Spirit fell upon them. Thriving on the religious enthusiasm of the first and second Great Awakenings, the Shakers declared their messianic, communitarian message with significant response. One early convert observed: "The wisdom of their instructions, the purity of their doctrine, their Christ-like deportment, and the simplicity of their manners, all appeared truly apostolical." The Shakers represent a small but important Utopian response to the gospel. Preaching in their communities knew no boundaries of gender, social class, or education.

== Village organization ==
=== Bishoprics ===
Shaker communities were grouped into bishoprics, which were governing units. The leadership team, called a ministry, resided in the bishopric's primary community. This ministry consisted of two men known as Elders and two women known as Eldresses. The New Lebanon Bishopric, the primary bishopric unit, was located in New York and included the Mount Lebanon and Watervliet Shaker Villages, as well as, after 1859, Groveland Shaker Village. In addition to its own member communities, the ministry of New Lebanon Bishopric oversaw all other Shaker bishoprics and communes. After New Lebanon closed in 1947, this central Ministry relocated to Hancock Shaker Village, and after the closure of that community in 1960, to Canterbury Shaker Village. When Canterbury closed in 1992, Sabbathday Lake Shaker Village remained as the last extant Shaker commune.

=== Family groups ===
A Shaker village was divided into groups or "families." The leading group in each village was the Church Family, and it was surrounded by satellite families that were often named for points on the compass rose. Managing each family was a leadership team consisting of two Elders and two Eldresses. Shakers lived together as brothers and sisters. Each house was divided so that men and women did most things separately. They used different staircases and doors. They sat on opposite sides of the room in worship, at meals, and in "union meetings" held to provide supervised socialization between the sexes. However, the daily business of a Shaker village required the brethren and sisters to interact, as did the dancing and other vigorous activity of their worship services. Though there was a division of labor between men and women, they also cooperated in carrying out many tasks, such as harvesting apples, food production, laundry, and gathering firewood. Every family was designed to be self-supporting with its own farm and businesses, but in times of hardship, other parts of the village, or even other Shaker villages, pitched in to help the afflicted.

== Communities ==
Image	Site	Spiritual name	Bishopric	City	State	Dates	Historic designation
	Alfred Shaker Village	Holy Land	Alfred (Note: The Alfred Bishopric was placed under the Canterbury Ministry from 1830 to 1859.)	Alfred	Maine	1793–1931	NRHP
	Canterbury Shaker Village	Holy Ground	Canterbury	Canterbury	New Hampshire	1792–1992	NRHP
	New Enfield Shaker Village	Chosen Vale	Canterbury	Enfield	New Hampshire	1793–1923	NRHP
	Old Enfield Shaker Village	City of Union	Hancock	Enfield	Connecticut	1792–1917	NRHP
	Gorham Shaker Village	Union Branch	Alfred	Gorham	Maine	1808–1819	
	Groveland Shaker Village	Union Branch	Groveland (Note: Groveland came under New Lebanon after 1859.)	Groveland	New York	1836–1892	
	Hancock Shaker Village	City of Peace	Hancock	Hancock and Pittsfield (Note: The Hancock Village spread out over Hancock, Pittsfield, and Richmond. In 1950, Eldress Francis Hall moved the Ministry from New Lebanon to Pittsfield.)	Massachusetts	1790–1960	NRHP
	Harvard Shaker Village	Lovely Vineyard	Harvard	Harvard	Massachusetts	1792–1918	NRHP
	Mount Lebanon Shaker Village	Holy Mount	New Lebanon	New Lebanon	New York	1785–1917	NRHP
	Narcoosee Shaker Village	Olive Branch	Union Village	Narcoosee	Florida	1895–1924 (Note: After the last Shakers left Narcoossee in 1924, it took until 1933 to successfully sell all the property)	
	New Canaan Shaker Village	None	New Lebanon	New Canaan	Connecticut	1810–1812	
	North Union Shaker Village	Holy Grove	North Union (Note: After 1862, North Union fell under Union Village. After 1889, Union Village oversaw all societies in Kentucky and Ohio.)	Cleveland	Ohio	1822–1899	NRHP
	Philadelphia Shakers	None	Watervliet (Note: Watervliet itself was part of the New Lebanon Bishopric, but the Philadelphia Shakers operated under the authority of the Watervliet Village)	Philadelphia (Note: Unique among Shaker communities, the Philadelphia Shakers were an urban community)	Pennsylvania	1858–c.1910	
	Pleasant Hill Shaker Village	None	Pleasant Hill	Harrodsburg	Kentucky	1806–1910	NRHP
	Sabbathday Lake Shaker Village	Chosen Land	Alfred	New Gloucester	Maine	1794–present	NRHP
	Savoy Shaker Village	None	New Lebanon	Savoy	Massachusetts	1817–1821 (Note: Some property in Savoy was retained by the Shakers until the 1880s)	
	Shirley Shaker Village	Pleasant Garden	Harvard	Shirley	Massachusetts	1793–1908	NRHP
	Sodus Bay Shaker Village	None	New Lebanon	Sodus and Huron	New York	1826–1836	
	South Union Shaker Village	Jasper Valley	South Union	South Union	Kentucky	1807–1922	NRHP
	Tyringham Shaker Village	City of Love	Hancock	Tyringham	Massachusetts	1792–1875	NRHP
	Union Village Shaker Village	Wisdom's Paradise	Union Village	Turtlecreek Township	Ohio	1805–1912	
	Watervliet Shaker Village	Wisdom's Valley	New Lebanon	Albany	New York	1776–1926	NRHP
	Watervliet Shaker Village (Ohio)	Vale of Peace	Union Village	Kettering	Ohio	1806–1900	Marker #6-57
	West Union Shaker Village (Busro)	None	Union Village	Busro	Indiana	1807–1827	
	White Oak Shaker Village	None	Union Village	White Oak	Georgia	1898–1902	
	Whitewater Shaker Village	Lonely Plain of Tribulation	Whitewater	New Haven	Ohio	1822–1916	NRHP

=== Out-families, short-lived settlements, and missions ===
Some organized In addition to the organized communities, other small and very short-lived communities emerged during the history of the Shakers, as well as various missions. These included:

- Numerous communities throughout New England: Cheshire, Ashfield, Richmond, Shelburne Falls, Turners Falls, Norton, Petersham, Grafton, Upton, and Rehoboth in Massachusetts; Windham, Preston, Stonington, and Saybrook, Connecticut; Guilford and Pittsford, Vermont; and Tuftonboro, New Hampshire. These emerged during the 1780s but were eventually absorbed into the larger Shaker communities.
- Two families in Canaan, New York. These began in 1813, and were part of the larger New Lebanon Village.
- Poland Hill at Poland, Maine. This community, founded by the former residents of Gorham when that village closed, served as the North Family and Gathering Order of the Sabbathday Lake Shaker Village.
- Drake's Creek, or the Mill Family, in Warren County, Kentucky, was a venture by the South Union, Kentucky, Shakers, to establish a water-powered mill some 16 miles removed from the South Union community itself. Begun in 1817, the venture proved unsuccessful and was shut down in 1829.
- A community in Darby Plains in Union County, Ohio, which existed from 1822-1823. Quickly abandoned, the Shakers there relocated to the Whitewater Settlement.
- Missions to Straight Creek and Eagle Creek in Ohio.
- A short-lived settlement at Red Banks, Kentucky.
- Missions to San Francisco and San Diego, California, in the 1880s and 1890s. Arthur W. Dowe, from Canterbury Shaker Village, operated a mission in San Francisco for several years in the early- and mid-1890s at 948 Mission Street. A small urban community of Shakers persisted in the city until the 1906 earthquake and ensuing fire. Cornelia R. Powers, of Watervliet Shaker Village, was in San Diego by the late 1880s and missionized there for several years.

== Shaker village tourism ==
In the 19th century, hundreds of tourists visited Shaker villages, and many of them later wrote about their experiences there. Outsiders were invariably impressed by Shaker cleanliness, prosperity, and agriculture. Shaker food was delicious, and they were hospitable to outsiders. Shakers had a reputation for honesty and their products were the best of their kind.

== Museums ==
- Alfred Shaker Museum, Alfred, Maine
- Canterbury Shaker Village, Canterbury, New Hampshire
- Enfield Shaker Museum, Enfield, New Hampshire
- Fruitlands Museum, Harvard, Massachusetts
- Hancock Shaker Village, Hancock, Massachusetts
- Pleasant Hill, Kentucky, Harrodsburg, Kentucky
- Sabbathday Lake Shaker Village, New Gloucester, Maine
- Shaker Historical Museum, Shaker Heights, Ohio
- Shaker Historical Society, Colonie, New York
- Shaker Museum | Mount Lebanon, New Lebanon, New York
- Shaker Museum at South Union, Auburn, Kentucky
