= District No. 5 School =

District No. 5 School or District No. 5 School House may refer to:

- District No. 5 School (Alfred, Maine)
- District No. 5 School House (Hermon, Maine)
- District No. 5 School (Petersham, Massachusetts)
- District No. 5 School (Shrewsbury, Massachusetts)
- District Five Schoolhouse (Webster, Massachusetts)
- District 5 School (Child, New York)
