= Joshua Bussell =

American painter

Joshua Bussell (1816–1900) was an American Shaker artist.

Bussell entered the Shaker community at Alfred, Maine with his family in 1829, and remained there until his death, a resident of its Second Family; he became an Elder in 1863. A cobbler by trade, he began producing maps of Shaker villages in 1845, carrying the tradition later into the nineteenth century than any other Shaker artist and developing a style which gradually evolved into fully developed watercolor paintings. His subjects included the Shaker villages at Alfred and New Gloucester, the latter's Poland Hill family, and the community at Canterbury, New Hampshire. He also composed hymns, including "Jubilee", which long remained in the repertoire of Maine Shakers. Robert P. Emlen has attributed seventeen drawings in total to Bussell.

A Bussell map of the Alfred community is currently owned by the Museum of Fine Arts, Boston. Another view of the same community is in the collection of the American Folk Art Museum.
