= Enfield Shaker Historic District =

Enfield Shaker Historic District may refer to:

- The Enfield Shaker Museum in Enfield, New Hampshire, and its historic district
- The Enfield Shakers Historic District (Connecticut) in Enfield, Connecticut
