= Shaker Seed Company =

Former US seed company

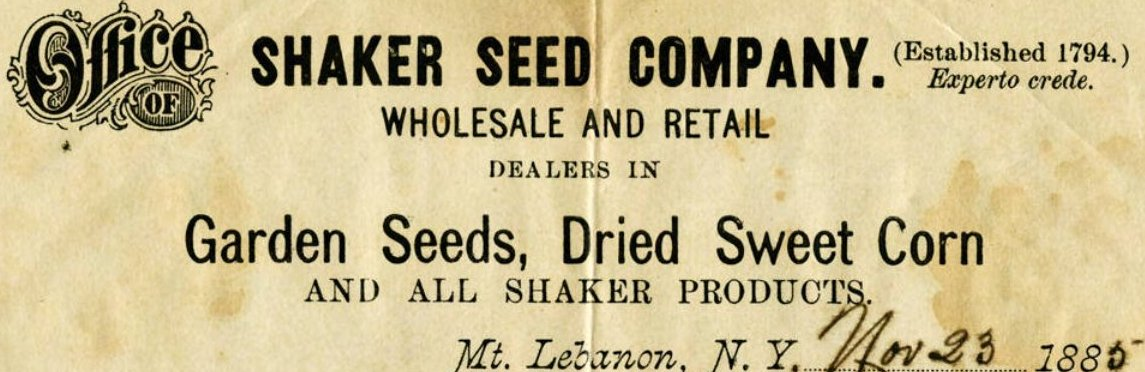
Shaker Seed Company 1885 letterhead

The Shaker Seed Company was an American seed company that was owned and operated by the Shakers in the eighteenth and nineteenth century. In the latter part of the eighteenth century, many Shaker communities produced several vegetable seed varieties for sale. (Note: "Now known mostly for wonderfully simple architecture, austere but beautifully designed furniture and such functional objects as nesting oval boxes and baskets, members of the Shaker communities also once had booming garden and seed businesses. Their labor-intensive methods of working inevitably came to be overwhelmed by competition from industrial manufacturing as well as the problem of ever-shrinking membership, celibacy being one of their central tenets") The company created innovations in the marketing of seeds – including distributing, packaging and cataloging – all of which changed the horticultural business model forever.

The Mount Lebanon Shaker Village in New Lebanon, New York, was the most successful and the first to use the name Shaker Seed Company in advertising. As its stationery reveals, the company adopted the phrase "Experto crede" as its motto, noting its establishment in 1794.

== Background ==
In August 1774, nine Shakers from England landed in New York City. In the fall of 1776 they settled in Watervliet, New York. Their religion soon spread throughout the Northeast, and around the year of 1787 a headquarters was established at New Lebanon, New York. By the mid-19th century some eighteen major, long-term settlements Shaker had been established.

The Shakers were avid gardeners who saved the best seeds to cultivate the following year. Historian D. A. Buckingham states that Joseph Turner of Watervliet assigned about two acres of land in 1790 for the purpose of raising vegetable seeds to sell for an income. He is the first known Shaker to package seeds for sale, making him the first American seed salesman. The Watervliet Shakers were the first people in the United States to sell garden seeds commercially. About this same time the Shaker community at New Lebanon began selling their surplus seeds. However, it was not until 1795 that they set aside land for the purpose of seed production for sale to outsiders. Shakers also did this at Canterbury, New Hampshire, and Hancock, Massachusetts.

== Sales ==
At the beginning of the nineteenth century, Shaker seed salesmen were one of the few sources of seeds for the American gardener. (Note: "Commercial growers of seeds and nursery plants played an important role in the development of horticulture in America. Responsible for the wide distribution of seeds and plants across the country, they determined what was available for cultivation. Moreover, many early seed growers and nursery owners were horticultural experimentalists and botanical enthusiasts, and were largely responsible for the introduction and dissemination of new garden species in the United States, and the development and popularization of new plant varieties for the American garden. Materials relating to commercial seed and plant cultivators reveal trends and tastes in American horticultural practice both regionally and nationally. ... It was with the imported and domestic seeds of David Landreth in Philadelphia and Grant Thornburn in New York, and the high-quality, home-grown Shaker seeds of Watervliet and New Lebanon, N.Y., that the seed trade became a full-time American business.") Seed sales was one of the Shakers' most successful enterprises, providing the greater portion of their total income. The Shaker seed business stemmed from their rural agricultural roots and sold mostly to small villages and farming communities in the Northeastern United States. Their marketing techniques were state of the art. The Shaker Seed Company became known for high quality and fair prices. The Shakers provided useful things – garden seeds – at a time of need for American pioneers. (Note: "In many ways, the Shakers' most successful industry was their garden seed enterprise.")

The Shakers of New Lebanon sold their own garden seeds from 1794. Commercial sales as "a prominent industry" began in 1800. At their zenith, the Shakers of New Lebanon sold over 37,000 pounds of seeds for a value of nearly $34,000 in a 25-year period in the mid-nineteenth century. About this same time the Canterbury Shaker Village in New Hampshire and the Enfield Shakers in Connecticut had joined the seed selling business as well with over a hundred acres dedicated just to seed production. The Mount Lebanon community was the most successful of all the Shaker communities in purveying seeds. From 1800 to 1880 the Shakers sold their seeds throughout North America, and the seeds were considered of the highest quality available. In many cases, the Shaker seeds were the only seed source for rural Americans.

New Lebanon sales records show that in the decade before and after 1800 the onion seed sold the best. Shaker peddler Artemas Markham showed in his records of 1795 that over 200 pounds of onion seeds were sold. In 1800 over 44 pounds of a variety of vegetable seeds sold, including mangelwurzel blood beet, carrot, cucumber, and summer squash, begetting $406 in income. Vegetables seeds were the main offering; however, flowers, herbs, and grasses also were available. The height of the Shaker seed business was in 1840, constituting at that point their chief industry.

The Shaker Seed Company of New Lebanon listed just over a dozen varieties of seeds in their early years. By 1873 they were offering eight different kinds of tomato, seven kinds of turnip, six kinds of lettuce, nine kinds of squash, eleven kinds of cabbage, sixteen kinds of peas, and fifteen kinds of beans. Their catalogs offered over a hundred kinds of seeds by 1890.

== Paper envelope packaging ==
The Shakers are credited with developing the idea of putting seeds in small paper envelope-style packets to sell to the general public. (Note: "Shakers invented the paper seed packet and soon all the Shaker communities were selling seed to gardeners.") (Note: "The American seed packet industry began with Shakers placing seeds in small hand-made paper envelopes. The labeled envelopes were assembled into wooden boxes and placed on horse drawn wagons. The men travelled extensively from town to town dropping the Shaker box of seed at general stores.") They introduced the innovation of placing tiny seeds in small paper envelopes bearing printed planting instructions for best results as well as storage and sometimes cooking suggestions. The Shakers were the first to use paper envelope-style packets as a strategy to sell and distribute seeds. (Note: "The Shakers found the most efficient way to provide a customer with the seeds was with a small paper envelope. They were the first to use seed packets as a marketing strategy.")

The concept itself is attributed to Shakers Josiah Holmes and Jonathan Holmes of the Sabbathday Lake Shaker Village. Before the development of the paper packets of seeds, the only way seeds were sold was in bulk in cloth sacks. The first seed envelope packets were made with plain brown paper with the seed variety name, where the seeds came from, and sometimes the grower's name. The first paper packets were pieces of paper cut into eight different sizes for the different seed types. The small paper envelopes were made by hand and folded and glued accordingly. (Note: "The Shakers are thought to have developed the innovation of packaging seeds for sale in small paper packets.") Ebenezer Alden invented a printing block device for printing the envelopes by hand.

Specific machines were made early in the nineteenth century to speed the process of cutting and printing the packets. New Lebanon Shaker journals referred to the seed packet sizes as: pound-bag size, bean size, beet size, onion size, cucumber size, cucumber long size, radish size, and lettuce size. The small paper envelope packets filled with seeds were boxed in colorful wooden displays made by the Shakers and marketed throughout the United States in the nineteenth century.

General stores throughout the United States displayed these wooden boxes with various seed envelope packet "papers" – as the Shakers called them. A typical box would hold 200 envelope packets that sold for five or six cents apiece. Shaker vendors had routes throughout the nation, many times a long distance from their home, but concentrated in the northeastern United States. Typically, the Shaker peddlers would deposit the wooden boxes of seed packet "papers" to the general stores in the spring on consignment and then in the fall gather them back up with their share of sales. Another method of distribution of the Shaker seeds was through mail-order. (Note: "At least two Shaker communities claimed to have been the first to produce seeds for sale.")

The Shaker Seed Company at New Lebanon was the most industrious of all the Shaker communities for producing seeds. The seed envelopes they made between 1846 and 1870 averaged over a hundred thousand packets per year.

== Demise ==
The Shaker philosophy encouraged excellence throughout their business practices, which was integral to their success. It also worked against them, as they ignored then outside competitors who, with different commercial philosophies, competed based mainly on price. Improved cheaper transportation methods opened the rural markets to the city commercial seed vendors, and competition then came about. The Shakers were unwilling to compete on price with the cheaper commercial dealerships. Their seed business deteriorated in the long run because of this.

In 1790, when the New Lebanon Shaker community developed their seed business, the population in the United States was just under four million. When nearly a century later the Shaker Seed Company ceased to exist as a seed business around 1890, the population of the nation was about fifty-two million.

== Gallery ==
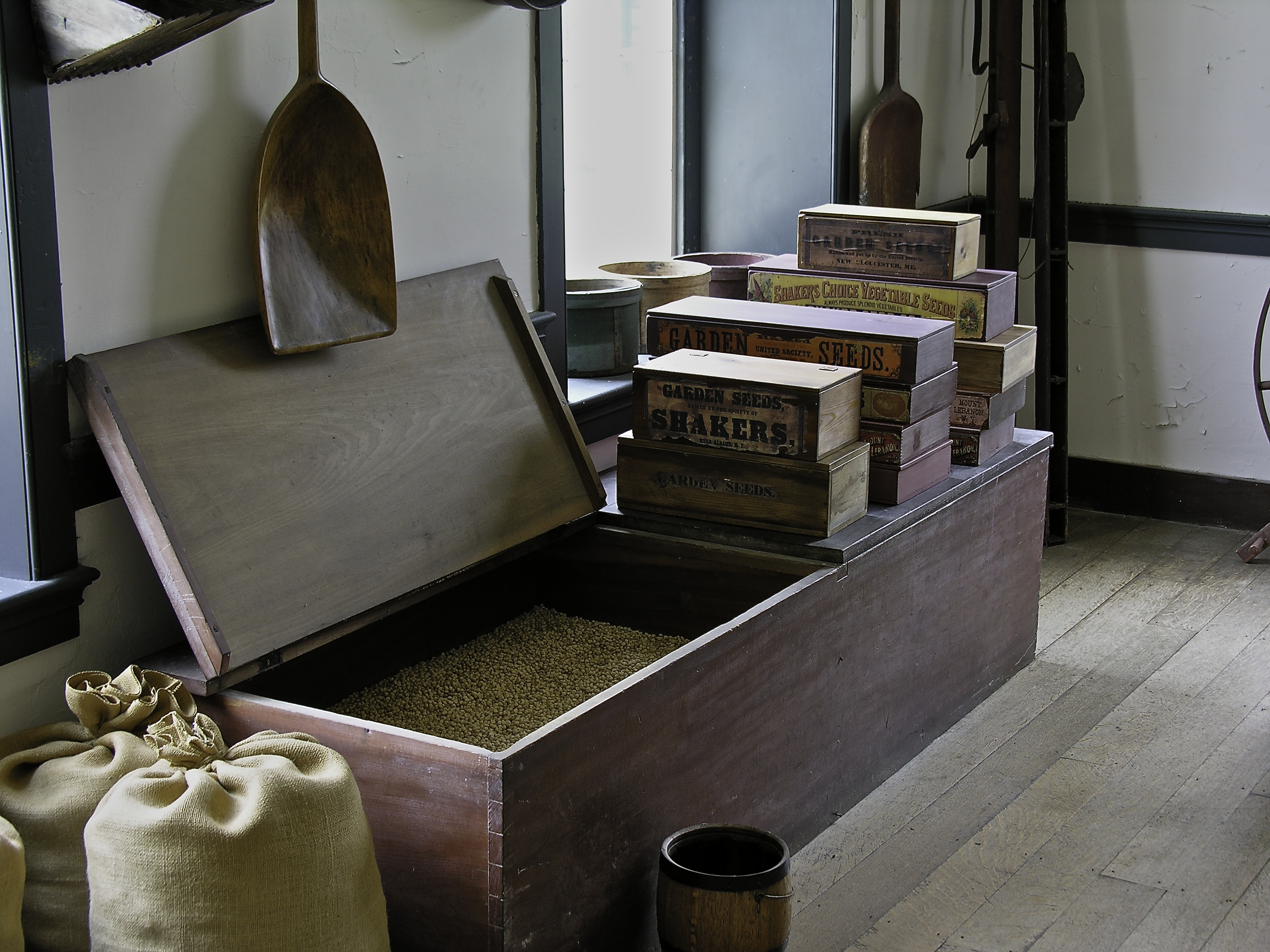
Shaker seeds in a big chest being prepared for placing into envelope "papers" of seed packets

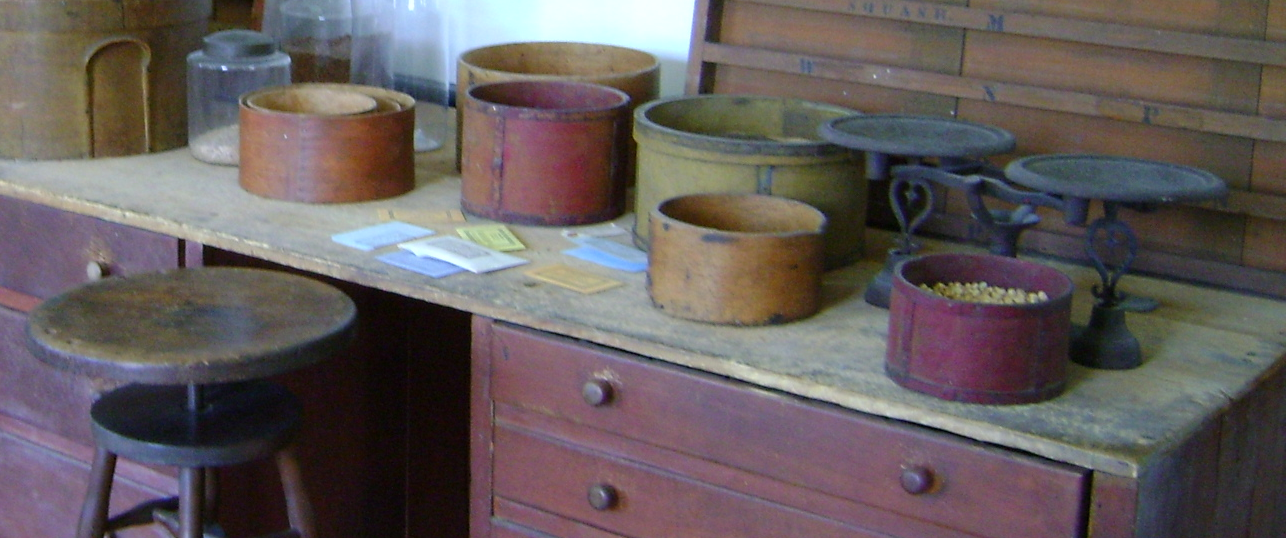
Seed packet envelopes being filled from containers of vegetable seeds at replication shop of Shakertown in Pleasant Hill, Kentucky

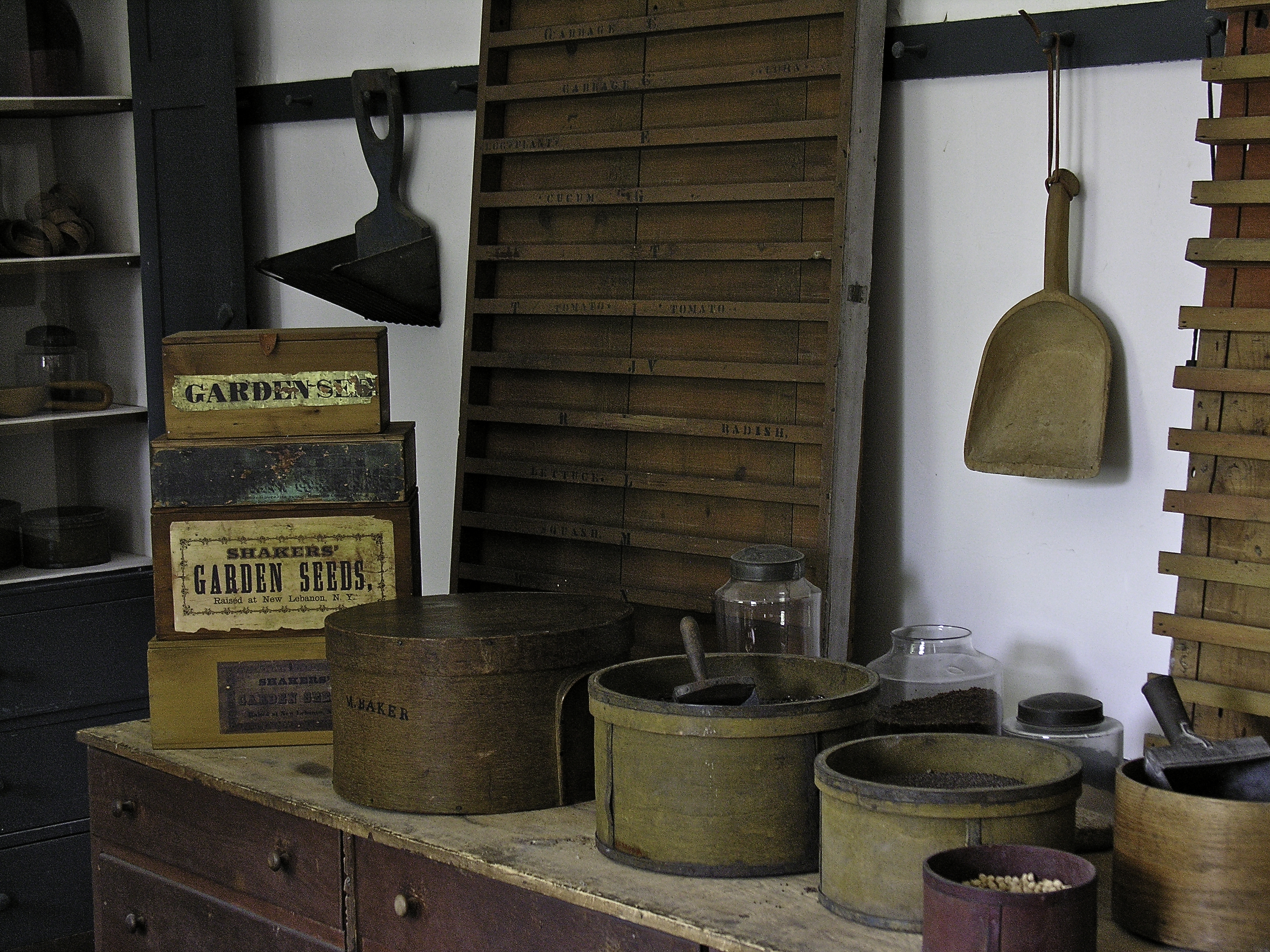
Shaker seed room showing preparation for fill measuring of envelope "papers"

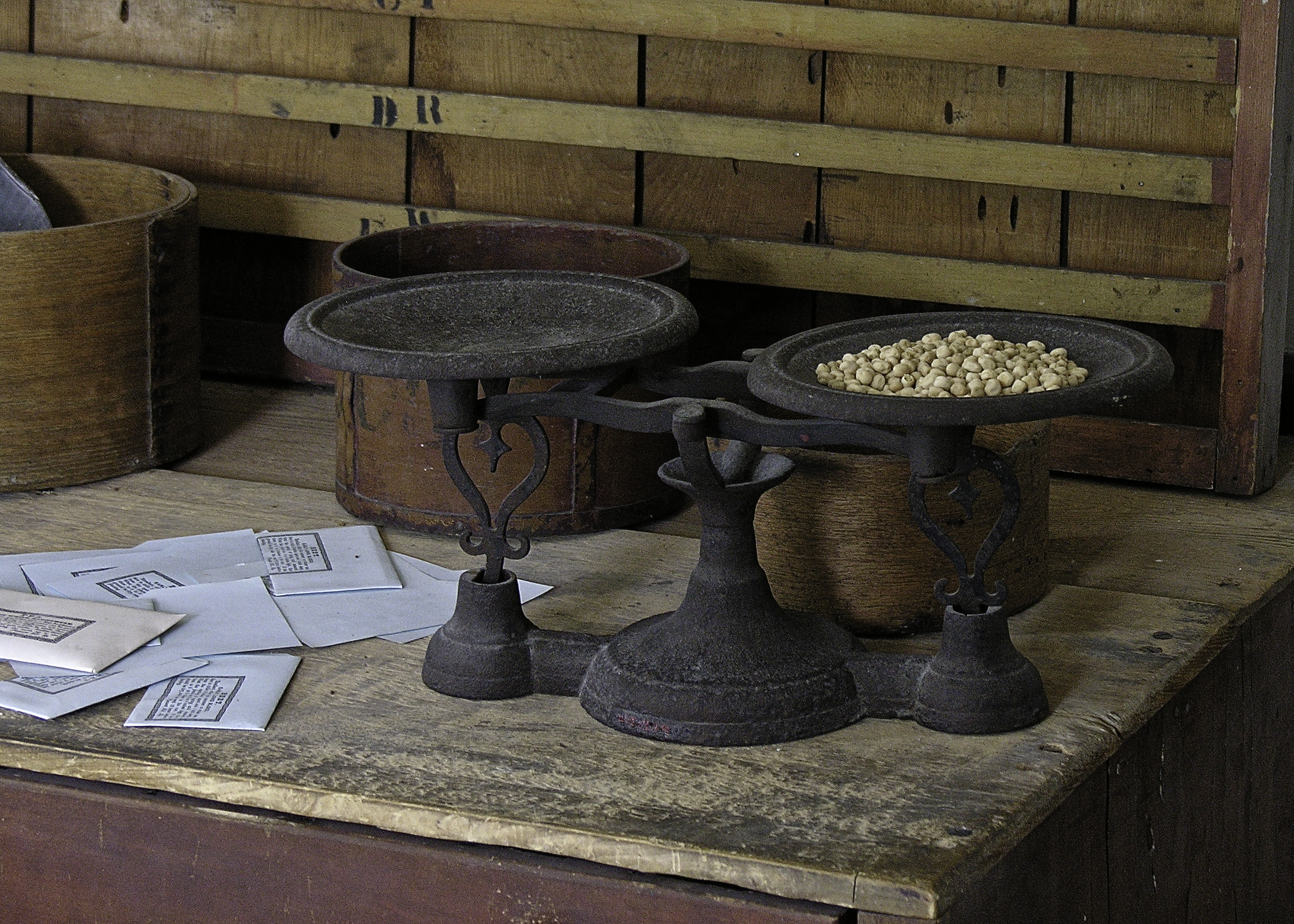
Weighing seeds before putting them into paper envelope packets

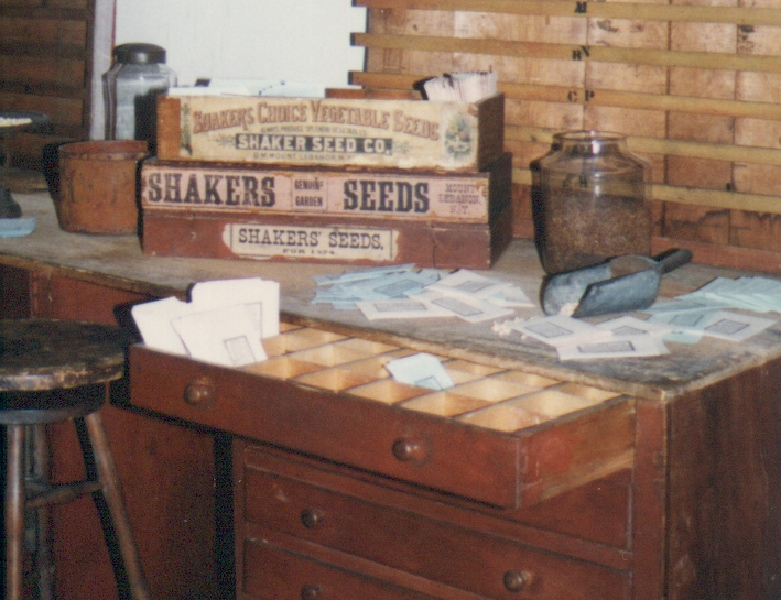
Shaker seed paper envelope packets being filled with various vegetable seeds

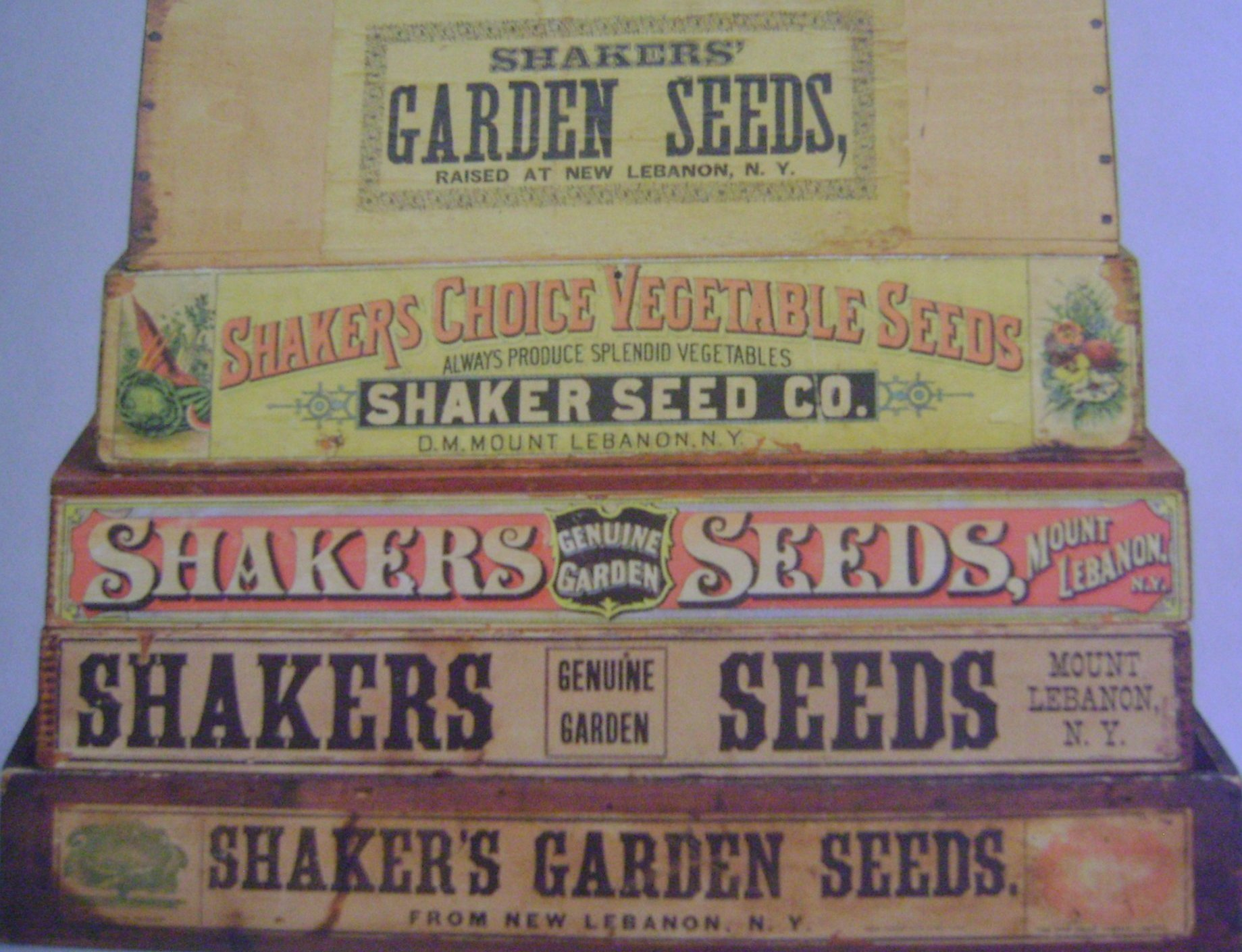
Stack of reproduction replicas of Shaker wooden display boxes

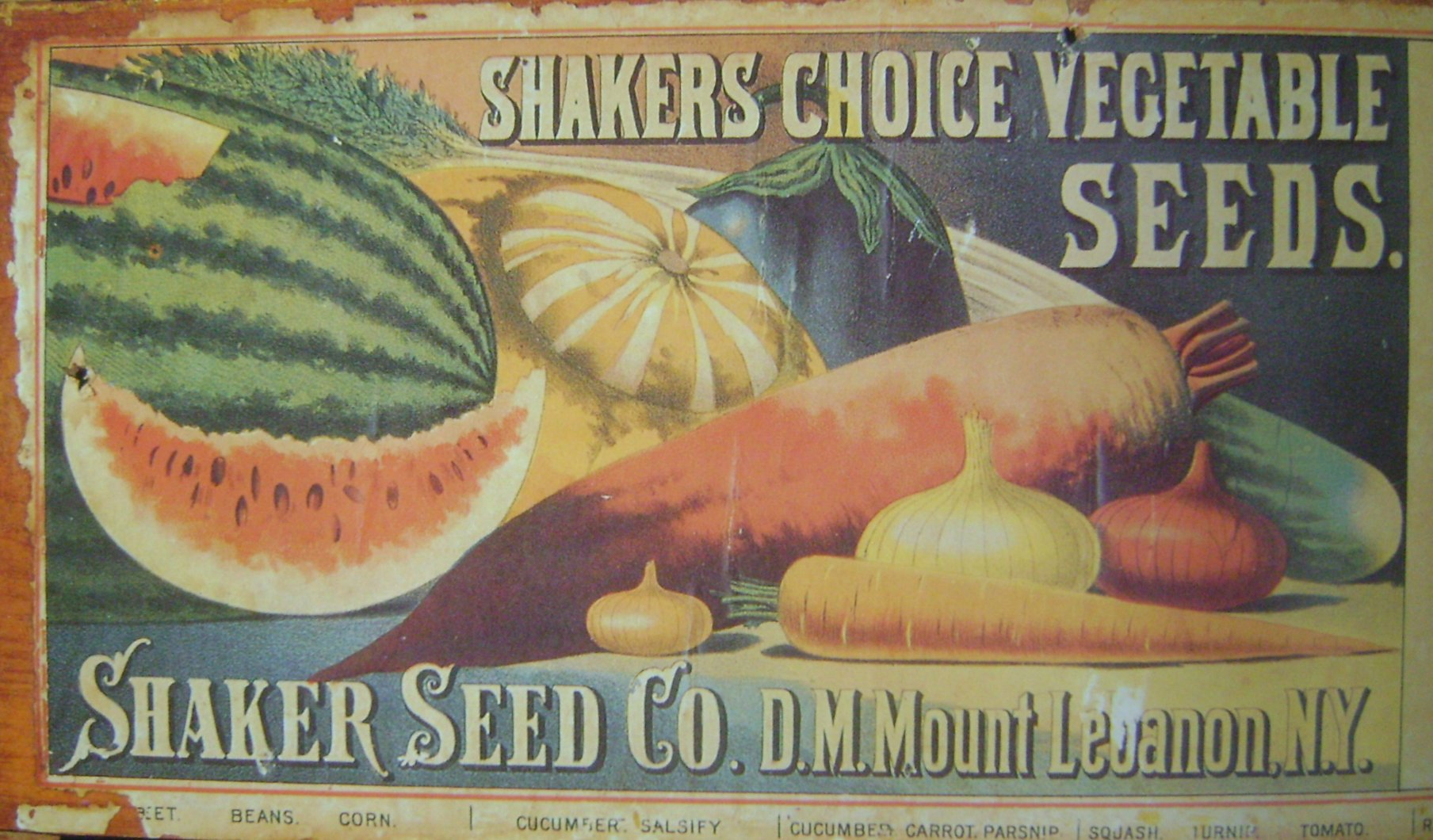
Label on wooden display box of Shaker seeds, c. 1870

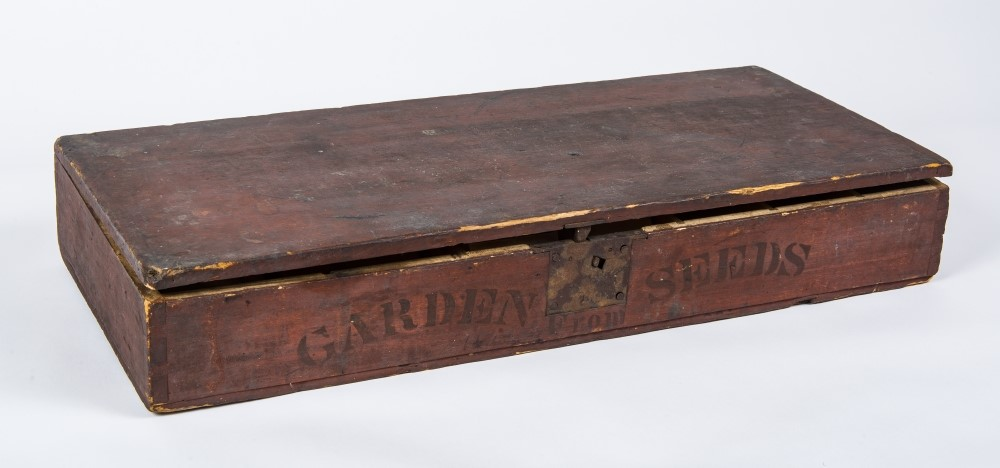
Original Seed Box; Enfield Shaker Village, New Hampshire; In the collection at Enfield Shaker Museum.
