= Sen. John Holmes House =

Historic house in Maine, United States

- U.S. National Register of Historic Places
- U.S. Historic district – Contributing property
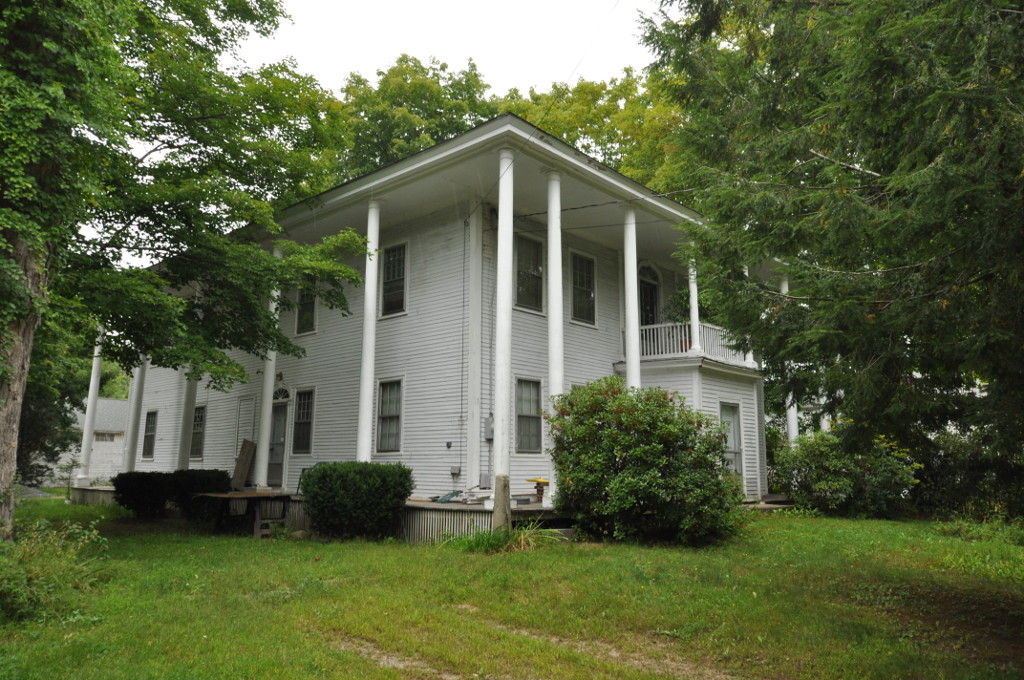

- Location within Maine Location within the United States
- Location: U.S. 202, Alfred, Maine
- Coordinates: 43°28′39″N 70°43′4″W
- Area: 1 acre (0.40 ha)
- Built: 1802
- Architectural style: Federal
- Part of: Alfred Historic District (ID83000479)
- NRHP reference No.: 75000117

Significant dates
- Added to NRHP: April 24, 1975
- Designated CP: April 28, 1983

The Sen. John Holmes House is a historic house on Main Street (United States Route 202) in Alfred, Maine. Also known as the Bow and Arrow house for a distinctive balustrade motif it once sported, it was built in 1802 for United States Senator John Holmes, one of western Maine's leading politicians of the period. The house was listed on the National Register of Historic Places in 1975.

== Description and history ==
The Holmes house is located on the west side of Main Street at the northern end of Alfred Village. It is a two-story wood-frame structure with a hip roof and clapboard siding. The roof was originally encircled by a balustrade that included a bow and arrow motif, but that has since been removed. The house has a number of features that are unusual for the location and period, including a two-story wraparound porch, supported by a colonnade of slender columns. The five-bay front facade faces east, and is symmetrically arranged, with the main entrance centered in an enclosed vestibule, above which is a balcony accessed by a doorway on the second floor. The first floor interior features high-quality Federal period woodwork. The house originally had an enclosed court. The kitchen, which held a fireplace with ovens and a copper vat for water, has been removed. An L-shaped addition has been added to the northwest section of the house.

The house was built in 1802 for Senator John Holmes, one of western Maine's leading politicians and a major proponent of statehood for what was then the District of Maine in Massachusetts. The bow-and-arrow balustrade, now removed, is said to have been a nod to Holmes' Native American ancestry on his mother's side. The railing was said to have been made by the Griffins, who had a blacksmithing shop nearby. The house remained in the Holmes family until 1849, when it was purchased by the Sayward family. The Sayward family owned the house until the early 1900s. The Marshall family inhabited the house after the Saywards. Dr. Sumner Marshall and his wife Elizabeth York Marshall, who was a nurse, raised three children here. They hosted re-enactments of Senator Holmes' return at the house that were attended by thousands of locals. It now serves as both a home and a dance studio.

== See also ==
- National Register of Historic Places listings in York County, Maine
