= Mildred Barker =

American Shaker musician, scholar, and religious leader

- Barker, as depicted in LIFE, 1967
- Born: Ruth Mildred Barker; February 3, 1897; Providence, Rhode Island
- Died: January 25, 1990 (aged 92); Sabbathday Lake Shaker Village, New Gloucester, Maine
- Occupations: Musician; writer; theologian; historian; public speaker; co-founder and business manager of The Shaker Quarterly; candy maker; store manager; sewer and knitter
- Known for: Early Shaker Spirituals
- Awards: National Heritage Fellowship; Catholic Art Association award Maine Arts Commission award Women's Career Center award from Westbrook College
- Musical career
- Genre: Shaker music
- Instrument: Voice
- Years active: 1904–1990
- Title: Eldress

Personal life
- Pen name: R. Mildred Barker

Religious life
- Religion: Christianity
- Denomination: Shaker

Senior posting
- Based in: Sabbathday Lake Shaker Village
- Post: Trustee; deaconess
- Period in office: 1971–1990
- Predecessor: Gertrude Soule
- Successor: Frances Carr

Ruth Mildred Barker (February 3, 1897 – January 25, 1990) was a musician, scholar, manager, and spiritual leader from the Alfred and Sabbathday Lake Shaker villages. A prominent and respected Shaker during her long life, she worked to preserve Shaker music. With the help of Daniel Patterson, she recorded Early Shaker Spirituals, a collection of Shaker songs. In recognition of her achievements in the field, in 1983 she received the National Heritage Fellowship. She also co-founded and managed The Shaker Quarterly, a magazine and journal focused on the Shakers, to which she was also a regular contributor.

== Biography ==
=== Birth and life at Alfred Village (1897–1931) ===
Barker was born in Providence, Rhode Island on February 3, 1897. She joined the Shakers on July 7, 1903, when her newly widowed mother placed her under the care of the Alfred village. She was placed into the Second Family, where sister Harriet Coolbroth became a mother figure for Barker. Barker was tasked with assisting the very elderly sister Paulina Springer, whom she befriended. Springer taught Barker the song "Mother Has Come with Her Beautiful Song". Springer died in 1905, and on her deathbed asked Barker to always remain Shaker, which Barker promised she would do. Barker's inclination to music continued, as Coolbroth and Lucinda Taylor taught her and other girls in her care Shaker songs, and Barker attempted to learn as many of these songs as she could. She later claimed that it was the "vim and vigor" of Shaker song that attracted her to the faith. She belonged to a club called the "Beacon Light Circle". Barker's mother returned in 1911 to take her back home to Providence, but Barker insisted on remaining at Alfred to live as a Shaker. Seven years later, she signed the covenant, binding herself as a member of the Alfred community. That same year, the Second Family was closed, and thus Barker relocated to Alfred's Church Family.

=== Sabbathday Lake (1931–1990) ===
In 1931, the Alfred community closed, and Barker moved to the Sabbathday Lake in New Gloucester, Maine. At Sabbathday Lake, she was placed in charge of the Girls' Order, where she formed the "Girls' Improvement Club", in which the girls and young women wrote poetry, practiced recitations, and studied the Bible. She also was placed in charge of preserves and candy making – specializing in hand-dipped chocolates – at the village's store, where she also sewed and knitted. She oversaw these industries until 1968. In 1950, she was made trustee of Sabbathday Lake and thus charged with running the businesses and finances for the entire village.

Since the 1940s, Barker was de facto spiritual leader for the Sabbathday Lake community. Gertrude Soule, who had left and rejoined the community several times, had been appointed Eldress in 1950, and felt uncomfortable with this level of Barker's influence. In 1957, she was appointed to the Parent Ministry at the Hancock Shaker Village, and so relocated to that Ministry's base in Pittsfield, Massachusetts. In 1971, Soules, now living at the Canterbury Shaker Village, decided not to return to Sabbathday Lake, and Barker was appointed Eldress in her stead.

In 1960, Theodore Johnson joined the Shakers, and the following year he and Barker launched The Shaker Quarterly, a journal and magazine that published scholarly articles on theology and the Shakers, shared news from the village, and, occasionally, advertised products produced by the community. Barker served as business manager for the publication from its founding until 1974, and frequently contributed articles as well as the regularly occurring newsletter column Home Notes. It was mostly through Barker's leadership that Sabbathday Lake decided to re-open their religious meetings to public attendance. She traveled as a speaker on topics regarding the Shakers. For many years, Barker worked with historian and musicologist Daniel W. Patterson toward preserving Shaker music. She commented that "I didn't realize for a very long time how important it was, it was a feeling that I got myself from the old songs, the music. It suddenly came upon me that I was keeping the tradition alive, which meant everything to me. We're just a small group, but it's something that the world needs and I'm sure it's going to pass right down through many centuries. I don't believe that it will be lost." She appeared on four recordings, including Early Shaker Spirituals. In recognition of her contributions to traditional Shaker song, in 1983 Barker was awarded a National Heritage Fellowship by the National Endowment for the Arts. Over the course of her life, she received numerous other awards as well. Barker died on January 25, 1990, after battling cancer for several months.

== Awards ==
- Catholic Art Association award, 1965
- Maine Arts Commission award, 1971
- National Heritage Fellowship, 1983
- Women's Career Center award from Westbrook College, 1987

== Selected works ==
- Barker, R. Mildred (1937). Greetings to you, from the Society of American Shakers. Sabbathday Lake Shaker Village. OCLC 25076604.
- Barker, R. Mildred (1963). Johnson, Theodore (ed.). "Revelation: A Shaker Viewpoint". The Shaker Quarterly. 5 (1). Gloucester, Maine: Sabbathday Lake Shaker Village: 7–17. ASIN B00073DX0O. ISSN 0582-9348. LCCN sf80001422. OCLC 65878644.
- Barker, R. Mildred (1983). Poems and Prayers. Sabbathday Lake Shaker Village: The Shaker Press. ASIN B0007B5KES. OCLC 894492882.
- Barker, R. Mildred (1985) [1978, 1st edition]. Sabbathday Lake Shakers: An Introduction to the Shaker Heritage (2nd ed.). Sabbathday Lake Shaker Village: The Shaker Press. ISBN 978-0915836048. OCLC 50144364.
- Barker, R. Mildred (1986) [1983, 1st edition]. Holy Land: A History of the Alfred Shakers. Sabbathday Lake Shaker Village: The Shaker Press. ISBN 978-0915836031. OCLC 21952433.
- Barker, R. Mildred (1996) [1966, 1st addition]. Early Shaker Spirituals (CD). Supporting vocals by Ethel Peacock, Elsie McCool, Della Haskell, Marie Burgess, Frances Carr; additional performers from the United Society of Shakers, Sabbathday Lake, Maine. Program notes by Daniel W. Patterson. (6th ed.). Rounder Records. ASIN B0000002DC. LCCN 72761670. OCLC 36097123.
