= Ira Drew =

Ira Drew may refer to:

- Ira T. Drew (died 1897), American politician in Maine
- Ira W. Drew (1878–1972), American politician in Pennsylvania
