= The Shaker Quarterly =

- Discipline: Shakers, history, theology, religious studies, mail order catalog
- Language: English
- Edited by: Theodore E. Johnson; Arnold Hadd; Wayne Smith

Publication details
- History: 1961–1975, 1987–1996
- Publisher: Sabbathday Lake Shaker Village (United States)
- Frequency: Quarterly

Standard abbreviations
- ISO 4: Shak. Q.

Indexing
- ISSN: 0582-9348
- LCCN: sf80001422
- OCLC no.: 1681198

The Shaker Quarterly was a periodical published by the Sabbathday Lake Shaker Village from 1961 to 1996. It served as a journal and newsletter about the Shakers, and at times also doubled as a mail order catalog advertising products created by the Shaker community at Sabbathday Lake. It was the first regular Shaker publication since the Manifesto ceased publication in 1899.

The Quarterly was launched in 1961 by Theodore E. Johnson and Mildred Barker. An attempt to keep Shaker doctrine alive, its founding marked the beginning of a renewed interest in the Shakers during the 1960s. Several Shaker industries were revived, including the Shaker herb industry, at Sabbathday Lake. In 1971, the Shaker community began stocking herbal products in the village store, and advertising herbal products in the Quarterly. For instance, the Winter 1971 issue listed eighteen culinary herbs and eleven herbal teas for sale.

The publication emphasized the history of the Shakers, but also published, and republished, articles discussing their religion and theology. It featured devotionals and various theological and historical works written by the Shakers themselves, but also included book reviews and scholarly research from other contributors. Among Barker's contributions was the regularly occurring column "Home Notes." Johnson acted as the journal's original editor, and after his death was replaced by Arnold Hadd and Wayne Smith. The Quarterly suspended publication between 1975 and 1986, and ceased publication in 1996.
