= Alfred Historic District =

Historic district in Maine, United States

- U.S. National Register of Historic Places
- U.S. Historic district
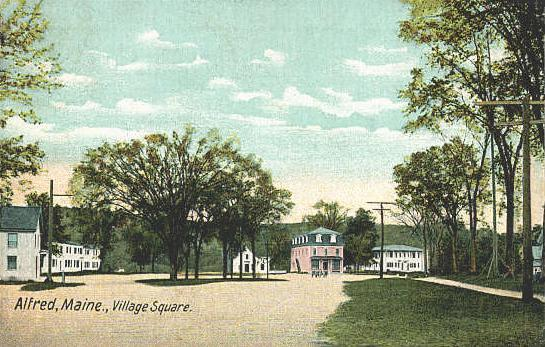
- Village Square, Alfred, ME; from a 1906 postcard

- Location within Maine Location within the United States
- Location: Kennebunk, and Saco Roads. Alfred, Maine
- Coordinates: 43°28′24″N 70°42′58″W
- Area: 15 acres (6.1 ha)
- Architect: Multiple
- Architectural style: Greek Revival, Federal
- NRHP reference No.: 83000479
- Added to NRHP: April 28, 1983

The Alfred Historic District is an historic district encompassing the historic village center of Alfred, Maine. The roughly Y-shaped district radiates from the junction of Oak Street with Kennebunk, Waterboro, and Saco Roads, and is characterized by high-quality 19th-century wood-frame buildings. The district was added to the National Register of Historic Places in 1983.

== Description and history ==
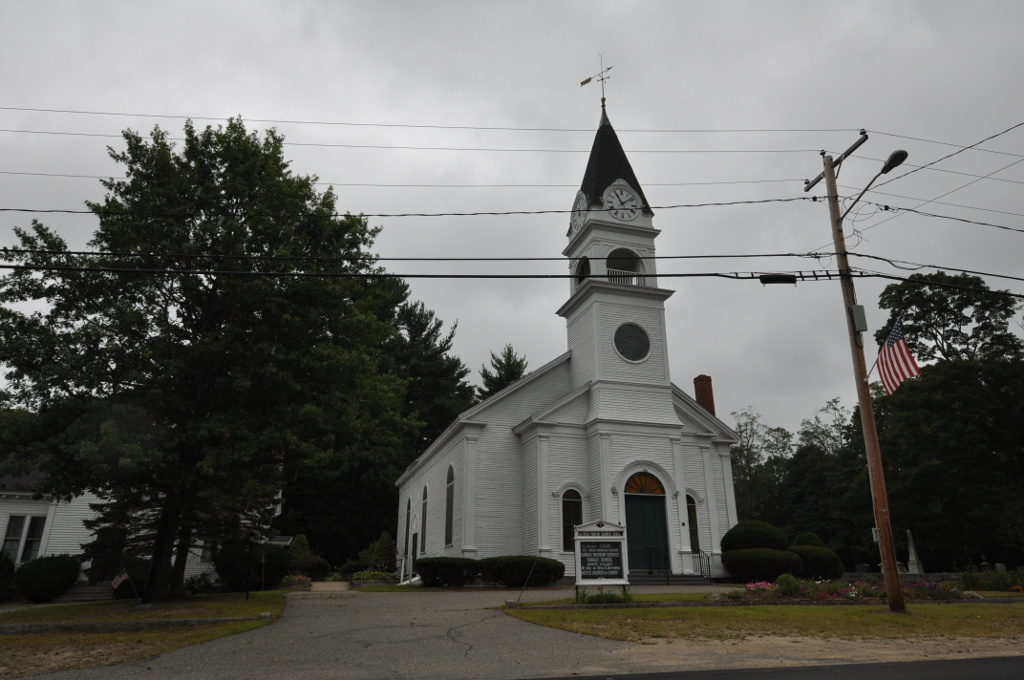
The UCC Church in Alfred

Alfred was settled in the 1760s and incorporated in 1794. The oldest surviving buildings in the village date to this time, although most of them have alterations giving them a 19th-century appearance. One example of this is the c. 1770 "Barn Knight's Barn" house, which dates to this period but has later Italianate styling applied. Alfred was named the county seat of York County in the early 19th century, stimulating a period of growth. The village was where a number of prominent lawyers made their homes, due to its proximity to the county courthouse. The most famous of these was John Holmes, who arrived in 1794 and was influential in the selection of Alfred as the county seat. His house was built in 1802 as a Cape, and raised to a full two stories in 1812; it is known as the "bow and arrow" house for some of its decorative elements, and is separately listed on the National Register for its association with Holmes.

Much of the building stock of Alfred Village was built in the early to mid-19th century, and is reflective of the styles popular then. There are a significant number of Federal style houses, although some, like the 1826 Daniel Goodenow House, have later stylistic alterations. The Alfred Parish Church built in 1834, is a fine example of Greek Revival styling. Most of the civic buildings in the district date from the mid-19th century or later, including the Italianate Town Hall (1862), fire station (c. 1911, but Late Victorian in style), and the Old County Jail (1871, designed by Gridley James Fox Bryant). The York County Courthouse has elements dating back to its original construction in 1807, with Italianate wings added in 1856. It was damaged by fire in 1933 and rebuilt, and has a generally Colonial Revival appearance. The village's most prominent commercial establishment, the Alfred Country Store, is in a c. 1841 building that was Greek Revival when built, but has also seen subsequent stylistic alterations.

== See also ==
- National Register of Historic Places listings in York County, Maine
