= Tyringham Shaker Settlement Historic District =

Historic district in Massachusetts, United States

- U.S. National Register of Historic Places
- U.S. Historic district
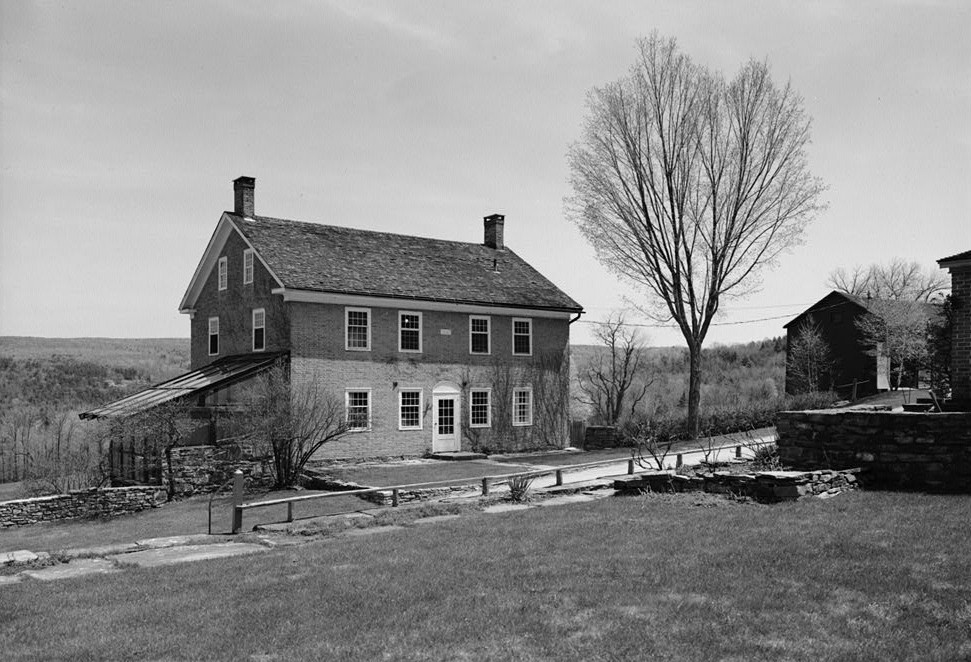
- 1968 photo by Jack E. Boucher

- Location within Massachusetts Location within the United States
- Location: Tyringham, Massachusetts
- Coordinates: 42°14′46″N 73°13′30″W
- Built: 1792
- Architectural style: Greek Revival, Italianate, Federal
- NRHP reference No.: 87001785
- Added to NRHP: October 15, 1987

The Tyringham Shaker Settlement Historic District was a historic Shaker village on Jerusalem Road in Tyringham, Massachusetts. Among the buildings in the village were mills and workshops. There was a reduction in members prior to the American Civil War and in the 1870s the remaining "believers" moved to Hancock Shaker Village in Massachusetts and Enfield Shakers Village in Connecticut.

In 1874 the Shakers traded the property to a New York City doctor, Joseph Jones, for property in Pennsylvania. Dr. Jones open a summer retreat and boardinghouse called "Fernside". In 1889 the property was sold to the Tyringham Forest Club. It is now farmland.

It was added to the National Register of Historic Places in 1987.

== Shaker settlement ==
The Shaker community was established in 1792, and flourished, acquiring more than 2,000 acres (810 ha) in Tyringham and adjacent towns at the height of the movement's popularity. The farmstead of William Clark on Jerusalem Road was the site of the main settlement, with a satellite settlement about .75 miles (1.21 km) further north. In addition to their communal living and worship spaces, the Shakers built a number of mill buildings, workshops, and even a furnace. The population of the settlement began to shrink in the years before the American Civil War, and its demise was hastened by the departure in 1858 of 23 individuals. In the 1870s the remaining Tyringham Shakers moved to other settlements (in Hancock, Massachusetts and Enfield, Connecticut).

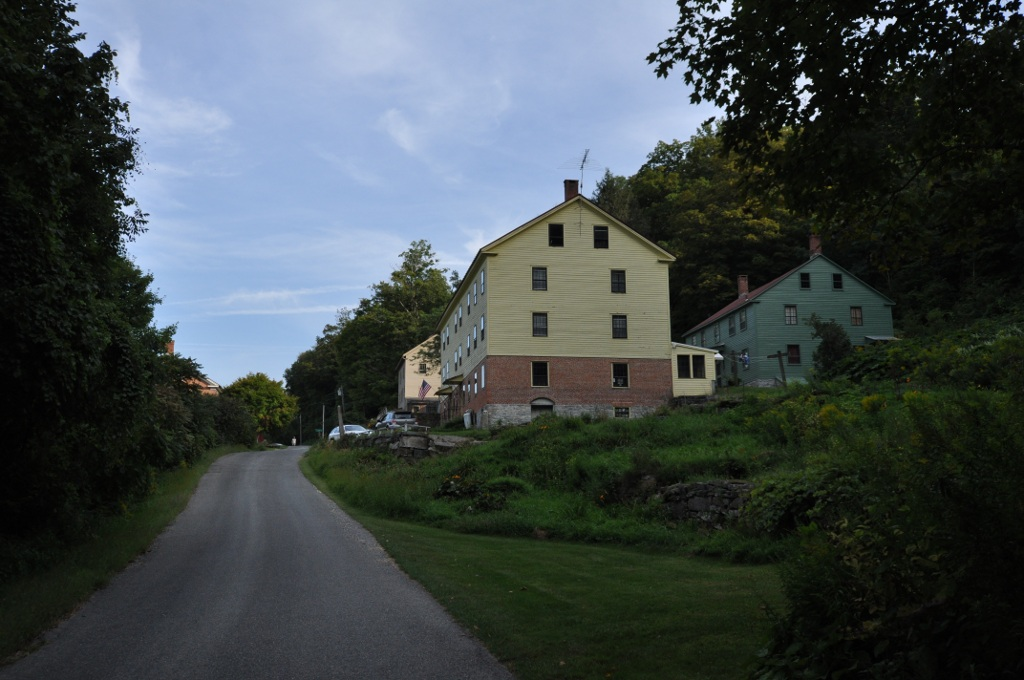
Shaker settlement, Tyringham, Massachusetts

== Subsequent uses ==
In 1874 the Shakers executed a property exchange with a New York City doctor, Joseph Jones, who owned a property in Pennsylvania in which they were interested. Dr. Jones used the property as a summer retreat they called "Fernside", and eventually operated it as a summer boarding house. He sold the property to other New York interests in 1889, which organized it as the Tyringham Forest Club. This enterprise was only briefly successful, and the property was sold at auction a few years later. Since then, the property has seen a variety of owners, and is once again a farmstead.

== National Register of Historic Places ==
The district features Greek Revival, Italianate style, and Federal style architecture. It was added to the National Register of Historic Places in 1987.

== See also ==
- National Register of Historic Places listings in Berkshire County, Massachusetts
