= David R. Burns =

American politician

Member of the Maine House of Representatives
- In office 2010 – January 31, 2012

Personal details
- Party: Republican
- Spouse: MiKyong
- Education: Concordia University Texas
- Profession: Information technology consultant

David R. Burns is a Maine politician. Burns was a Republican member of the Maine House of Representatives representing the District 138, which included his residence in Alfred as well as other towns in York County including Limerick, Newfield and Shapleigh. In his first term in office, Burns ran as a clean elections candidate and served on the Taxation Committee. He earned a B.A. in Business Administration from Concordia University Texas. He served 20 years in the United States Army.

On November 30, 2011, the Maine Ethics Commission ruled that Burns broke campaign finance rules during his 2010 campaign. The ethics commission declared that Burns owed more than $2,000 for violating state law regarding the use of public funds, including the co-mingling of personal and campaign funds, the falsifying of documents and other chargers of malfeasance. The commission also asked Maine Attorney General William Schneider to open a criminal investigation and impose a large fine for the violations which Commission chair Walter McKee called "mind-boggling".

On January 31, 2012, Burns resigned from the Maine House of Representatives following an investigation by the Maine Attorney General. Earlier in the same day, leading Democratic state representative Emily Cain had called for Burns's immediate resignation.

After pleading guilty to misdemeanor forgery and theft charges in connection with his 2010 election campaign he was sentenced to six months in prison.
