= Alfred, Maine =

Town in Maine, United States

- Town
- Alfred Town Hall

- Seal
- Motto: "Shiretown of York County"
- Location within Maine Location within the United States Location within North America
- Coordinates: 43°30′37″N 70°45′07″W
- Country: United States
- State: Maine
- County: York
- Settled: 1764
- Incorporated: 1794
- Named for: Alfred the Great
- Villages: Alfred; Alfred Mills; North Alfred

Government
  - Type: Board of Selectmen

Area
  - Total: 27.92 sq mi (72.31 km^{2})
  - Land: 27.25 sq mi (70.58 km^{2})
  - Water: 0.67 sq mi (1.74 km^{2})
- Elevation: 279 ft (85 m)

Population (2020)
  - Total: 3,073
  - Density: 113/sq mi (43.5/km^{2})
- Time zone: UTC−05:00 (EST)
  - Summer (DST): UTC−04:00 (EDT)
- ZIP Code: 04002
- Area codes: 207
- FIPS code: 23-00730
- GNIS feature ID: 582319
- Website: www.alfredme.gov

Alfred is a town in York County, Maine, United States. As of the 2020 census, the town population was 3,073. Alfred is the seat of York County, and home to part of the Massabesic Experimental Forest. National Register of Historic Places has two listings in the town, the Alfred Historic District, with 48 houses, and the Alfred Shaker Historic District.

Villages in the town include Alfred, Alfred Mills, and North Alfred. The town is part of the Portland-South Portland-Biddeford metropolitan area.

== History ==
The Abenaki people called the area Massabesic, meaning "large pond," or "the place of much water." It was in the western portion of a large tract of land purchased from Indigenous chiefs Fluellin, Hombinowitt and Meeksombe (also known as Captain Sunday), between 1661 and 1664 by Major William Phillips, an owner of mills in Saco (which then included Biddeford). According to historian Jim Brunelle, editor of the Maine Almanac, the price was "two large blankets, two gallons of rum, two pounds of powder, four pounds of musket balls, 20 strings of beads and several other articles."

Simeon Coffin of Newbury, Massachusetts, arrived in 1764 and lived for a time in a wigwam, although the first permanent settlement took place in 1770. Known as the north parish of Sanford, the community was set off and incorporated as a district on February 4, 1794. Sawmills and gristmills operated by water power at the streams. A log jail was built in 1803, with a brick jail in 1869. The courthouse was built in 1806, the year Alfred became the shire town of York County. It was incorporated as a town in 1808, named in honor of King Alfred the Great. Land would be set off to Sanford in 1828, and annexed from Waterboro in 1847. The Rochester & Portland Railroad entered from Waterboro in 1864, connecting to Rochester, New Hampshire, in 1871. More than 30 trains passed through Alfred daily between 1910 and 1920, but use would decline in the age of automobiles. Passenger service ceased in 1949, with the final train departing in 1961. A severe drought in Maine tindered the Great Fires of 1947, burning 4,500 acres (18 km^{2}) of woodland and two residences in the town.

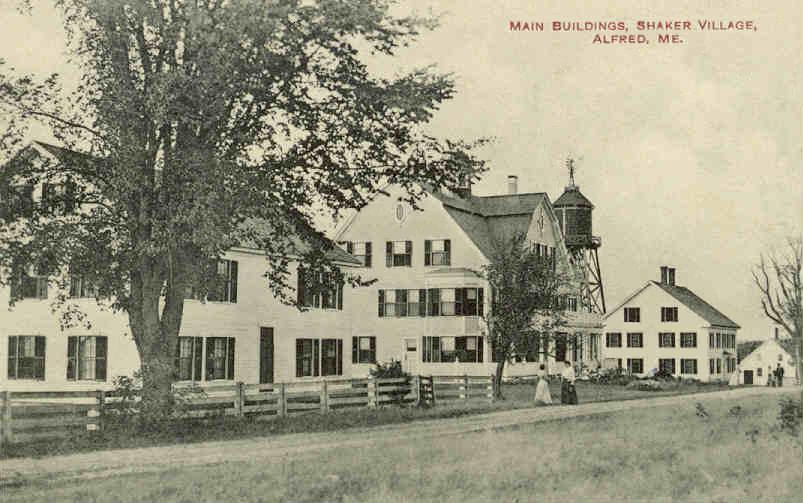
Alfred Shaker Village, c. 1915

A Shaker religious community once thrived in Alfred (now the Alfred Shaker Historic District). In 1783, members of the Shaker Church settled on the hill near Massabesic (now Shaker) Pond. Others dubbed them the "Merry Dancers," because of their ecstatic worship. "They were," as historian George J. Varney writes, "at this time fanatical in religion and intemperate in their indulgences."

In 1872, the District No. 5 School was built in northern Alfred. It was used as a school until 1921, thereafter providing a number of community functions. It was listed on the National Register of Historic Places in 2009.

In 1873 Louis H. F. Wagner rowed out to Smuttynose Island in the Isles of Shoals, off the Atlantic coast near Kittery, intending to rob but eventually murdering two of the three women left alone on the island. When the authorities finally caught up with him, jurisdiction for the case was given to York County and the county seat, Alfred. The biggest trial in the state at that time was held in the Alfred Court House.

Having little defense, Wagner was quickly found guilty and sentenced to be hanged on the gallows of the Maine State Prison at Thomaston. While awaiting transfer, he broke out of the Alfred jail and made his escape, eventually being caught in Farmington, New Hampshire.

== Geography ==
According to the United States Census Bureau, the town has a total area of 27.92 square miles (72.31 km^{2}), of which 27.25 square miles (70.58 km^{2}) is land and 0.67 square miles (1.74 km^{2}) is water. Alfred is drained by the Middle Branch of the Mousam River, Littlefield River, Hay Brook and Trafton Brook. Yeaton Hill has an elevation of 602 feet (183 m), and Brackett Hill an elevation of 480 feet (150 m). The highest point in town is on Fort Ridge, at an elevation of 1,020 feet (310 m), at the Shapleigh line.

== Demographics ==
Historical population
Census	Pop.	Note	%±
1800	900		—
1810	1,106		22.9%
1820	1,271		14.9%
1830	1,453		14.3%
1840	1,408		−3.1%
1850	1,319		−6.3%
1860	1,256		−4.8%
1870	1,224		−2.5%
1880	1,101		−10.0%
1890	1,030		−6.4%
1900	937		−9.0%
1910	890		−5.0%
1920	738		−17.1%
1930	883		19.6%
1940	1,039		17.7%
1950	1,112		7.0%
1960	1,201		8.0%
1970	1,211		0.8%
1980	1,890		56.1%
1990	2,238		18.4%
2000	2,497		11.6%
2010	3,019		20.9%
2020	3,073		1.8%

=== 2010 census ===
As of the census of 2010, there were 3,019 people, 1,175 households, and 769 families residing in the town. The population density was 110.8 inhabitants per square mile (42.8/km^{2}). There were 1,350 housing units at an average density of 49.5 per square mile (19.1/km^{2}). The racial makeup of the town was 97.5% White, 0.7% African American, 0.5% Native American, 0.2% Asian, 0.1% from other races, and 1.0% from two or more races. Hispanic or Latino people of any race were 0.7% of the population.

There were 1,175 households, of which 25.2% had children under the age of 18 living with them, 53.2% were married couples living together, 7.9% had a female householder with no husband present, 4.3% had a male householder with no wife present, and 34.6% were non-families. Of all households, 27.3% were made up of individuals, and 13.5% had someone living alone who was 65 years of age or older. The average household size was 2.33 and the average family size was 2.80.

The median age in the town was 45.7 years. 17.5% of residents were under the age of 18; 7.7% were between the ages of 18 and 24; 23.7% were from 25 to 44; 32.1% were from 45 to 64; and 18.9% were 65 years of age or older. The gender makeup of the town was 51.7% male and 48.3% female.

=== 2000 census ===
As of the census of 2000, there were 2,497 people, 996 households, and 682 families residing in the town. The population density was 91.7 inhabitants per square mile (35.4/km^{2}). There were 1,103 housing units at an average density of 40.5 per square mile (15.6/km^{2}). The racial makeup of the town was 98.52% White, 0.24% African American, 0.20% Native American, 0.48% Asian, and 0.56% from two or more races. Hispanic or Latino people of any race were 0.12% of the population.

There were 996 households, out of which 27.5% had children under the age of 18 living with them, 59.0% were married couples living together, 7.1% had a female householder with no husband present, and 31.5% were non-families. Of all households, 26.2% were made up of individuals, and 13.2% had someone living alone who was 65 years of age or older. The average household size was 2.39 and the average family size was 2.88.

In the town, the population was spread out, with 21.5% under the age of 18, 6.5% from 18 to 24, 26.8% from 25 to 44, 26.1% from 45 to 64, and 19.1% who were 65 years of age or older. The median age was 42 years. For every 100 females, there were 105.9 males. For every 100 females age 18 and over, there were 104.6 males.

The median income for a household in the town was $40,583, and the median income for a family was $47,625. Males had a median income of $36,957 versus $25,026 for females. The per capita income for the town was $19,337. About 4.2% of families and 5.5% of the population were below the poverty line, including 5.8% of those under age 18 and 9.0% of those age 65 or over.

== Arts and culture ==
=== Points of interest ===
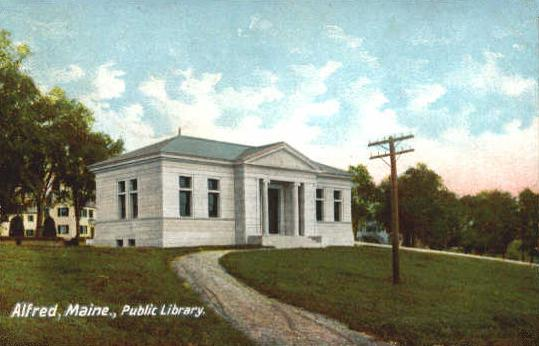
Parsons Memorial Library in 1906, donated to the town in 1905 by George and Edwin Parsons

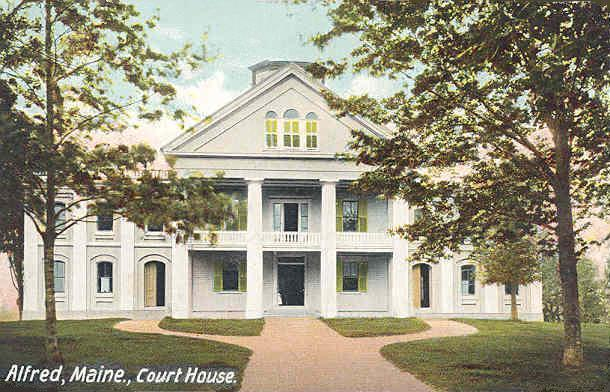
York County Courthouse in 1908

- Alfred Shaker Museum
- Alfred Village Museum
- Grave marker for Old Bet, first circus elephant in America

== Government ==
Alfred has three selectmen who manage town business. Selectmen are elected in an annual town meeting to three-year terms.

== Education ==
Alfred is in the School Administrative District 57.

Public school children go to Alfred Elementary School from kindergarten through fifth grade. Sixth, seventh and eighth grade students attend Massabesic Middle School in Waterboro. Ninth through twelfth graders attend Massabesic High School in Waterboro. Elementary aged students may also attend the private Unlimited Vision Montessori School.

== Facilities ==
The York County Jail is located in Alfred at 1 Layman Way. The jail houses inmates serving terms less than nine months and those awaiting trial for crimes committed in York County.

Alfred is also home to the York County courthouse, at 45 Kennebunk Road. Violations and crimes committed in York County are processed here.

Alfred housed York County's only shelter for 45 years, where the homeless and those needing assistance in York County lived and worked. The shelter closed in 2025. Nonprofit York County Shelter Programs, which ran the shelter, closed it in 2025, citing "significant and growing financial limitations".

== Adjacent towns ==
- Kennebunk
- Lyman
- Sanford
- Shapleigh
- Waterboro

== Notable people ==
- James Abbe, photographer
- Mildred Barker, musician, scholar, and Shakers eldress
- Joseph Brackett, songwriter and Shakers elder
- David R. Burns, member of the Maine House of Representatives
- Ira T. Drew, state legislator
- Horatio G. Herrick, sheriff of Essex County, Massachusetts
- John Holmes, U.S. representative from Massachusetts and U.S. senator from Maine
- Enrique Peña Nieto, president of Mexico 2012–2018; learned English as a schoolboy in Alfred
- Heidi H. Sampson, member of the Maine House of Representatives
