= District No. 5 School (Petersham, Massachusetts) =

- U.S. National Register of Historic Places
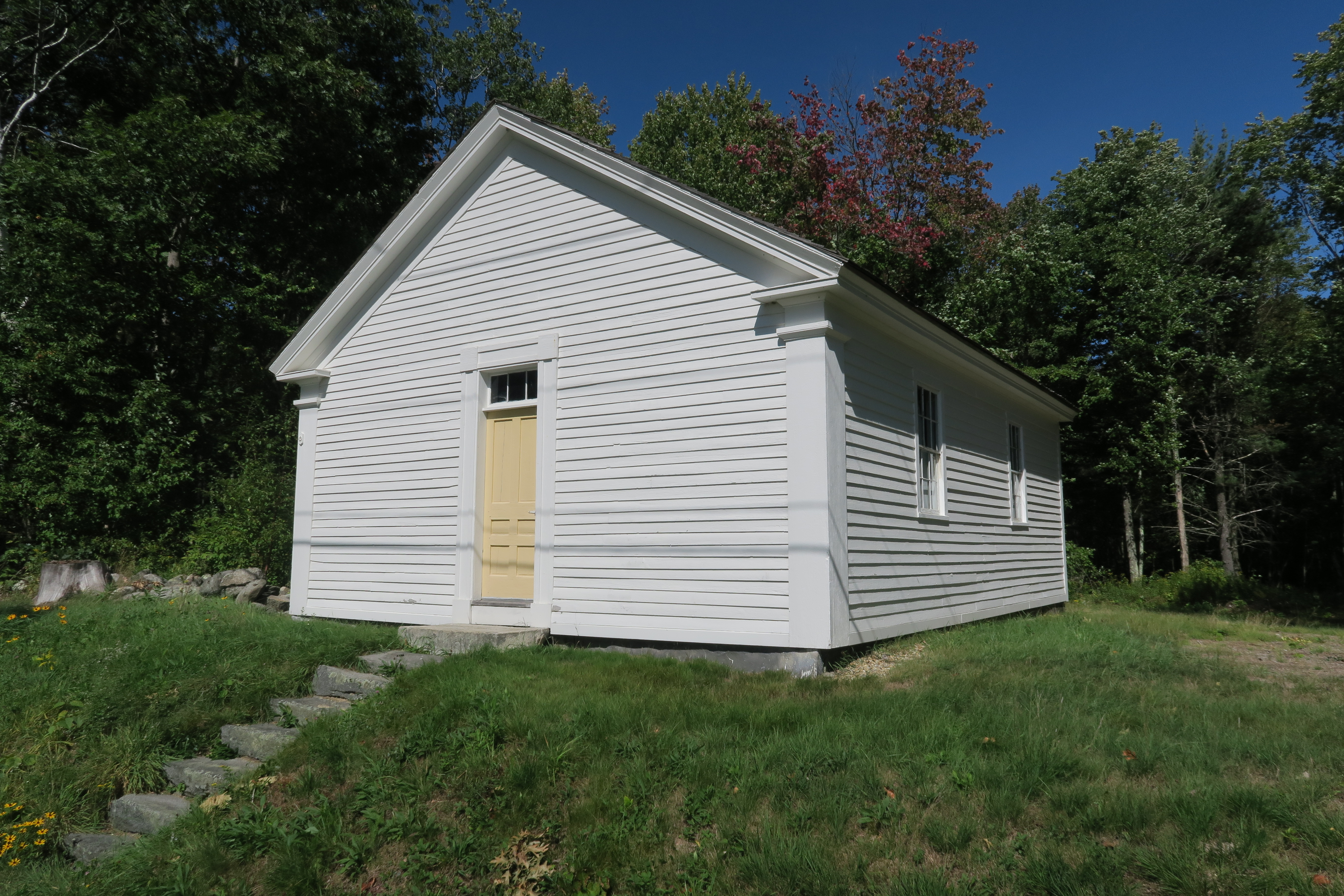
- District No. 5 School

- Location within Massachusetts Location within the United States
- Location: 311 East Road, Petersham, Massachusetts
- Coordinates: 42°29′6″N 72°7′59″W
- Area: less than one acre
- Built: 1849
- NRHP reference No.: 16000455
- Added to NRHP: July 18, 2016

The District No. 5 School is an historic school building and local history museum at 311 East Road in Petersham, Massachusetts. It is one of two relatively unmodified one-room schoolhouses in the town that were built in 1849. It is presently managed by the local historical society as a local history museum. The building was listed on the National Register of Historic Places in 2016.

== Description and history ==
The District No. 5 School is located in a rural area of eastern Petersham, on the northeast side of East Road just south of its junction with Harty Lane. It is a single-story wood-frame structure, with a gable roof, clapboarded exterior, and a stone foundation. The street-facing facade houses a single door, which provides access to the building. The side walls each have two windows. Trim consists of simple pilasters at the corners, and an entry surround with pilasters, transom window, and paneled entablature. The interior of the school has a vestibule area, which then opens into the classroom. The wall separating the spaces is vertical tongue-and-groove, with an original Federal-period door. The classroom walls are finished in vertical tongue-and-groove wainscoting, with plaster above. Floors appear to be original planking, and the original desks occupy much of the space.

The town of Petersham, incorporated in 1754, established a district school system consisting of thirteen districts. The present district 5 schoolhouse was built in 1849, and is one of three school buildings from the 1840s to survive in the town. It was built on land purchased by the town in 1803, at which time the district's second schoolhouse was built. The present school was built as a replacement of the 1803 building. District schools were formally abolished in Massachusetts in 1866, but this school remained open until 1880, and served one term in 1888 before being shuttered. In 1907, the town sold the vacant building to four former students, whose association held reunions at the school, and then donated it to the local historical society in 1941, stipulating that it be maintained and preserved. It is now operated by them as a museum.

== See also ==
- National Register of Historic Places listings in Worcester County, Massachusetts
