= District No. 5 School (Alfred, Maine) =

- U.S. National Register of Historic Places
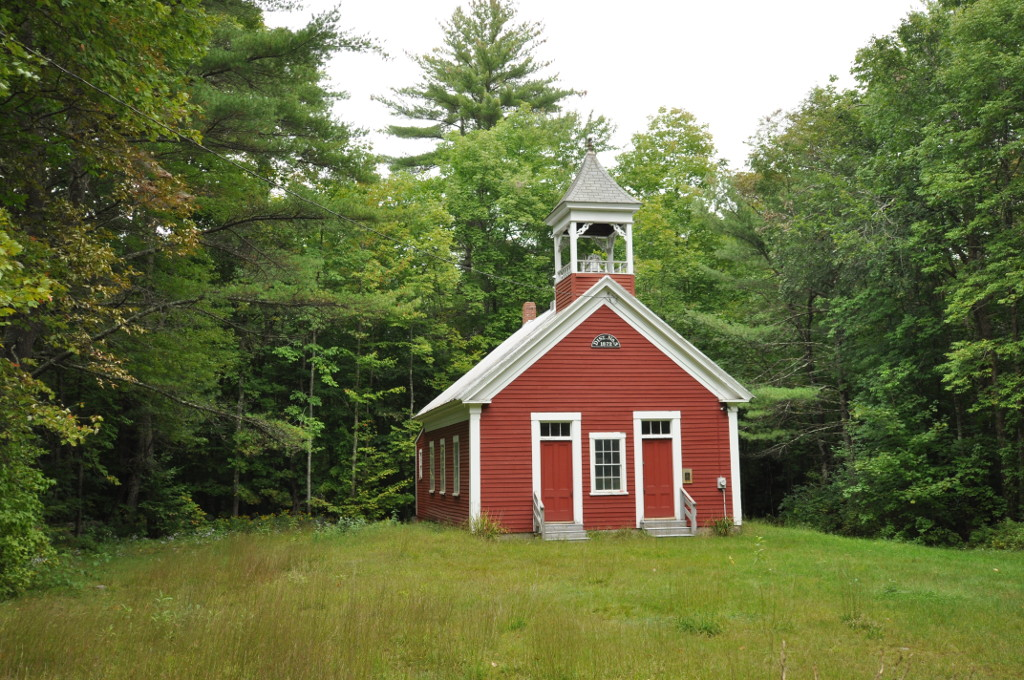

- Location within Maine Location within the United States
- Location: 781 Gore Road, Alfred, Maine
- Coordinates: 43°31′27″N 70°45′54″W
- Area: less than one acre
- Built: 1872
- Architectural style: Queen Anne
- NRHP reference No.: 09000015
- Added to NRHP: February 4, 2009

The District No. 5 School, also known as the Alfred Gore School, is an historic one room school at 781 Gore Road in Alfred, Maine. Built in 1872, it was used as a school until 1921, and was restored to its appearance of that time in the 2000s. It is the best-preserved of Alfred's surviving district school buildings, and was listed on the National Register of Historic Places on February 4, 2009.

== Description and history ==
The District No. 5 School is located on the east side of Gore Road, a short way north of the rural village of North Alfred, and south of the road's junction with Avery Road. Set near the back of a grassy area surrounded by woods, it is a small wood-frame structure with a front-facing gable roof, clapboard siding, and a granite foundation. An open belfry, with four posts, a low balustrade, and decorative brackets, rises above the ridge of the roof, and is capped by a flared pyramidal roof. The front (west-facing) facade is three bays wide, with a pair of entrances on either side of a sash window. There is a small brick chimney at the rear, where a shed-roof addition extends to the east. The entrances lead into small vestibules, which provide access to the classroom. The walls and ceiling are finished in bead board, and the floor is random-width pine.

The school was built in 1872, on a site that has had a school since at least 1856. The belfry was added in 1900 after school students raised $12 to purchase a bell from Sears, Roebuck. The school was closed in 1921 due to declining enrollments and a failure to meet new state standards for heating and sanitation. In the 1920s and 1930s the building was leased for use as a residence, and it was afterward used as a community center. In 1965 the rear addition, housing kitchen facilities, was added. In 2003 the building was formally turned over to the town by the district, and it has since been restored to its c. 1921 appearance.

== See also ==
- National Register of Historic Places listings in York County, Maine
