= Ira T. Drew =

American politician (died 1897)

Ira Towle Drew (died September 20, 1897) was a lawyer and politician in Maine. He served in the Maine Senate in 1848. He was a Democrat.

His home former on the village square and Kennebunk Road in Alfred, Maine was photographed ca. 1900. He was an incorporator of Alfred Bank in 1855.

His writings on legal decisions and common law in the United States were published in 1865.
