= Hancock Shaker Village =

- U.S. National Register of Historic Places
- U.S. National Historic Landmark District
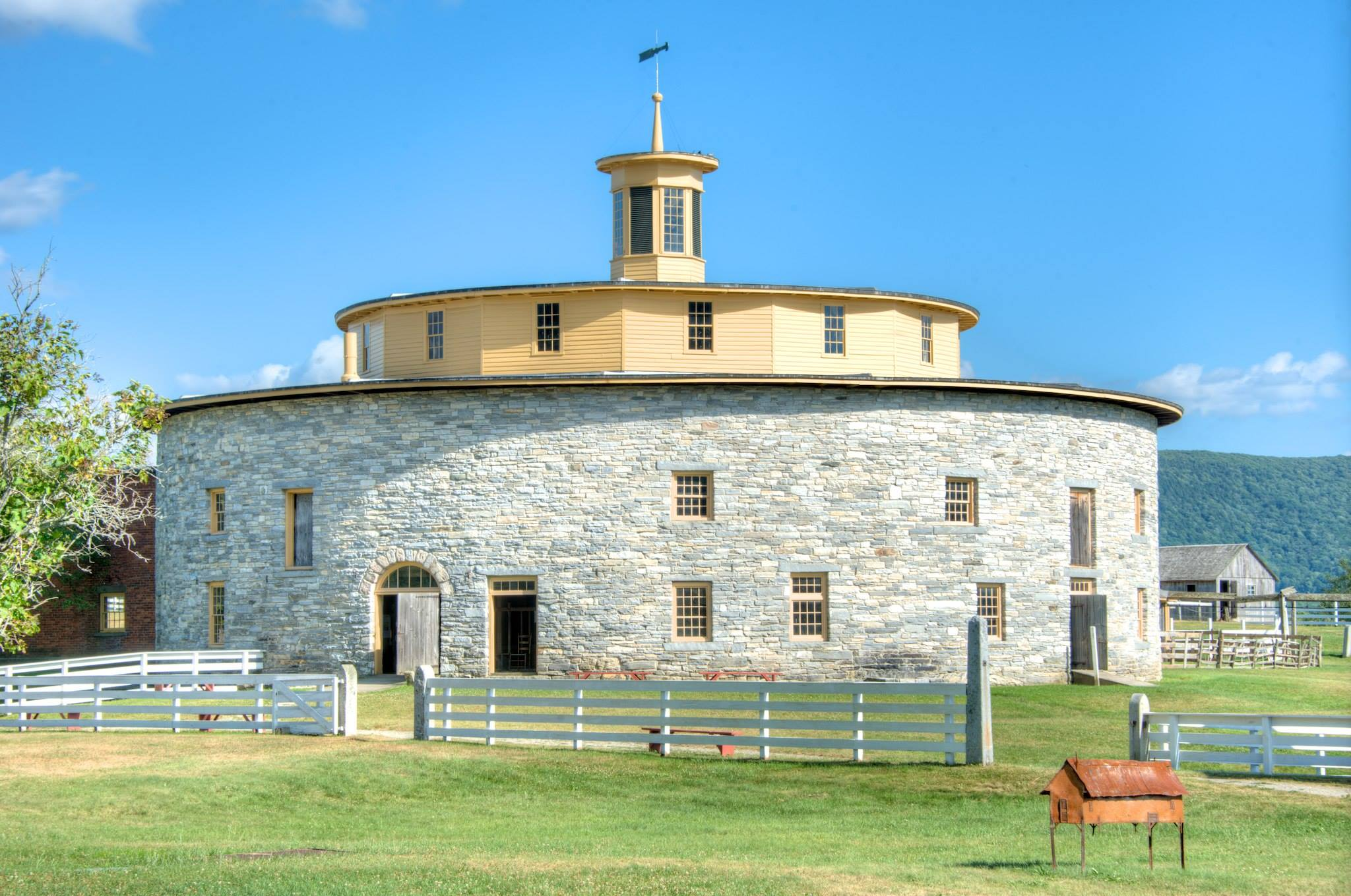
- The Round Barn

- Location within Massachusetts Location within the United States
- Nearest city: Hancock, Massachusetts
- Coordinates: 42.43°N 73.339°W
- Built: 1790
- NRHP reference No.: 68000037
- Added to NRHP: November 24, 1968

Hancock Shaker Village is a former Shaker commune in Hancock and Pittsfield, Massachusetts. It emerged in the towns of Hancock, Pittsfield, and Richmond in the 1780s, organized in 1790, and was active until 1960. It was the third of nineteen major Shaker villages established between 1774 and 1836 in New York, New England, Kentucky, Ohio and Indiana. From 1790 until 1893, Hancock was the seat of the Hancock Bishopric, which oversaw two additional Shaker communes in Tyringham, Massachusetts, and Enfield, Connecticut.

The village was closed by the Shakers in 1960, and sold to a local group who formed an independent non-profit. This organization now operates the property as an open-air museum. It was added to the National Register of Historic Places and declared a National Historic Landmark District in 1968.

== Organization and governance ==
At its peak in population in the 1830s and 1840s, Hancock consisted of six communal orders, known as "families": The Church Family, Second Family, East Family, West Family, South Family, and North Family. Overseeing each family was two men and two women, known as elders and eldresses. Overseeing the entire collective of Hancock families were two elders and two eldresses who served as the Ministry of the Hancock Bishopric. This ministry also oversaw the Tyringham, Massachusetts and Enfield, Connecticut Shaker communities. The Hancock Bishopric in turn was overseen by the Ministry in the New Lebanon community one town over, on the New York side of the state border. The various industries and tasks within each family at Hancock were managed by deacons and deaconesses, with the deacons of finance and legal affairs later becoming known as Trustees. In 1893, the Hancock Ministry was dissolved and the remaining members of the Hancock and Enfield villages were overseen directly by the Ministry of Mount Lebanon, which was renamed the Central Ministry.

== History ==
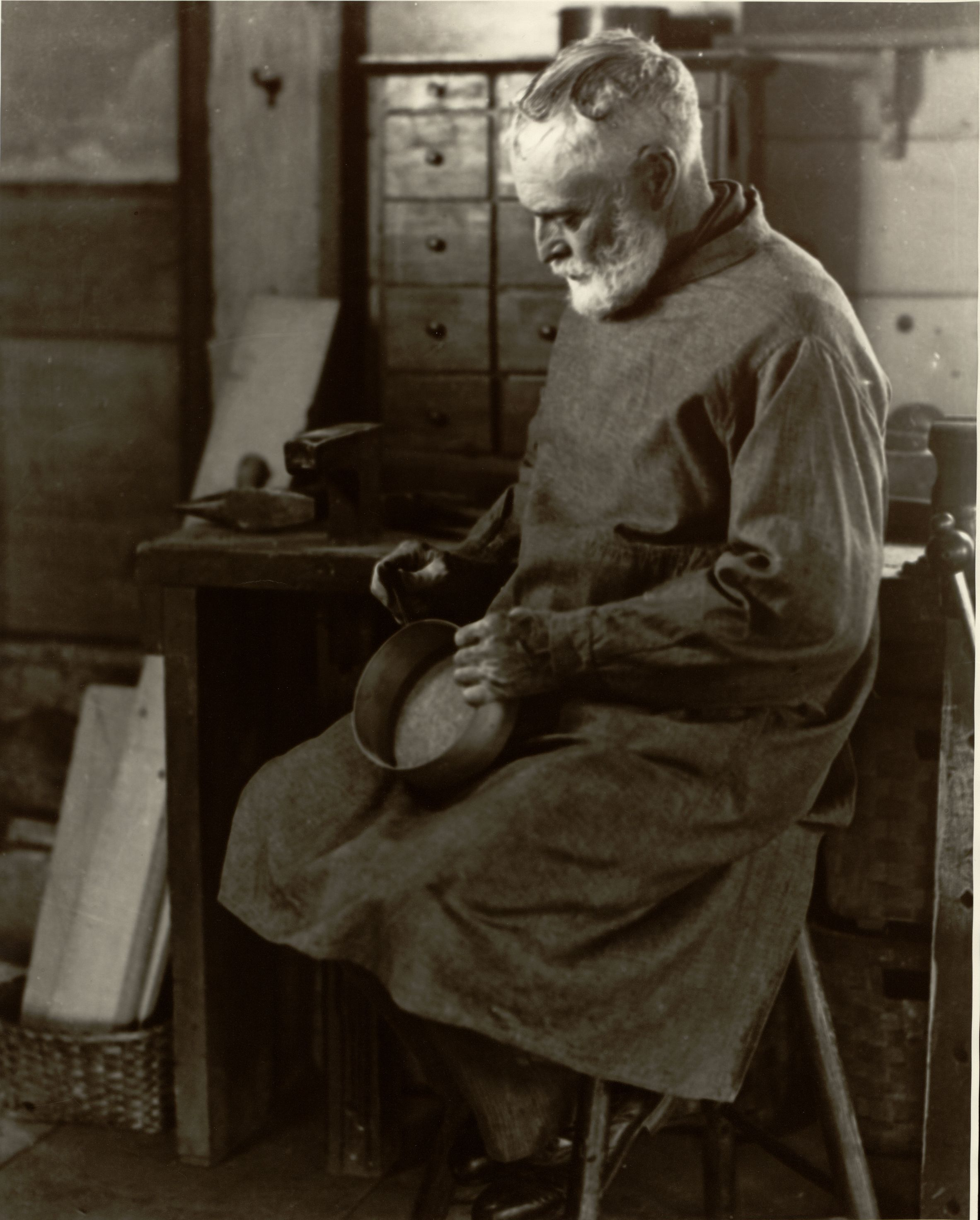
Brother Ricardo Belden making oval boxes in a workshop at Hancock in 1935

=== Background ===
The Shaker religion began in Manchester, England around the year 1747. A group of dissident Christians, they practiced ecstatic worship and egalitarianism. A young woman named Ann Lee gradually emerged as the primary leader of the group. In 1770, she experienced visions and revelations that told her that only by renouncing sexual relations could humankind ever achieve entrance into heaven. After enduring persecution in England, the small group of Shakers, led by Lee, set sail for the New York colony in 1774. By 1776, they settled within Watervliet, New York, establishing what became Watervliet Shaker Village. In the winter of 1779–1780, a brief religious revival swept through Baptist and Presbyterian congregations in Columbia County, New York and Berkshire County, Massachusetts. After the revival dissipated in the summer of 1780, many ministers and congregants from these churches investigated the Shakers and began converting. Invigorated by this influx of new converts, the Shakers expanded through missionary trips from 1780 through 1784 throughout the Northeast. Ann and William Lee died in 1784, and their friend and co-minister James Whittaker died in 1787. The movement was then re-organized and institutionalized by the American converts Joseph Meacham and Lucy Wright. Shaker converts were gathered into communal villages, where all property was jointly owned.

=== Formation of the Hancock community ===
After the conversion of the prominent local ministers Joseph Meacham and Calvin Harlow from Canaan and New Lebanon, New York, and then subsequently Valentine Rathbun and much of his family from West Pittsfield, Massachusetts, many farmers in New Lebanon, Hancock, West Pittsfield, and Richmond, began joining the Shaker faith starting in the 1780s. This included numerous members of the Goodrich family, Lucy Wright (the wife of Elizur Goodrich), John and Sarah Deming, Hezekiah Osborne, members of the Hammond family, Samuel Fitch, numerous members of the Talcott family, Luther and Joshua Cogswell, John Wright, Joshua Boyington, and Sarah Harrison. Others further afield, such as Samuel Johnson in West Stockbridge, Zipporah Carey and her mother in Cheshire, and Olive Miller of Hinsdale, also were drawn to the Shakers.

=== Subsequent history ===
The Hancock Shakers supported themselves primarily through farming. The raising and sale of garden seeds was the most lucrative of their early businesses. Land acquisition and conversion continued for decades, and by the 1830s some 300 Hancock Shakers owned about 3,000 acres (12 km^{2}). After reaching peak membership in the 1840s, the Shaker movement gradually dwindled, partially due to the urban migration that accompanied the Industrial Revolution, and by the westward migration of New England's youth. By the early twentieth century, the population of the village had fallen to around 50, most of whom were children. The remaining Shakers sold off their excess land, and many buildings were destroyed. The decision was eventually made in 1960 to close the village and sell the property and buildings.

Non-Shakers were impressed by the Hancock Shaker property—scrupulously clean, neat, and well-tended—and their innovations in farming, such as the round barn that attracted much attention (see description below). Visitors also praised Hancock Shakers' products, including boxes "of beautiful workmanship" and garden seeds. Before 1820, the village was prosperous and the Shakers were respected as good neighbors.

== Architecture ==
=== 1826 Round Stone Barn ===
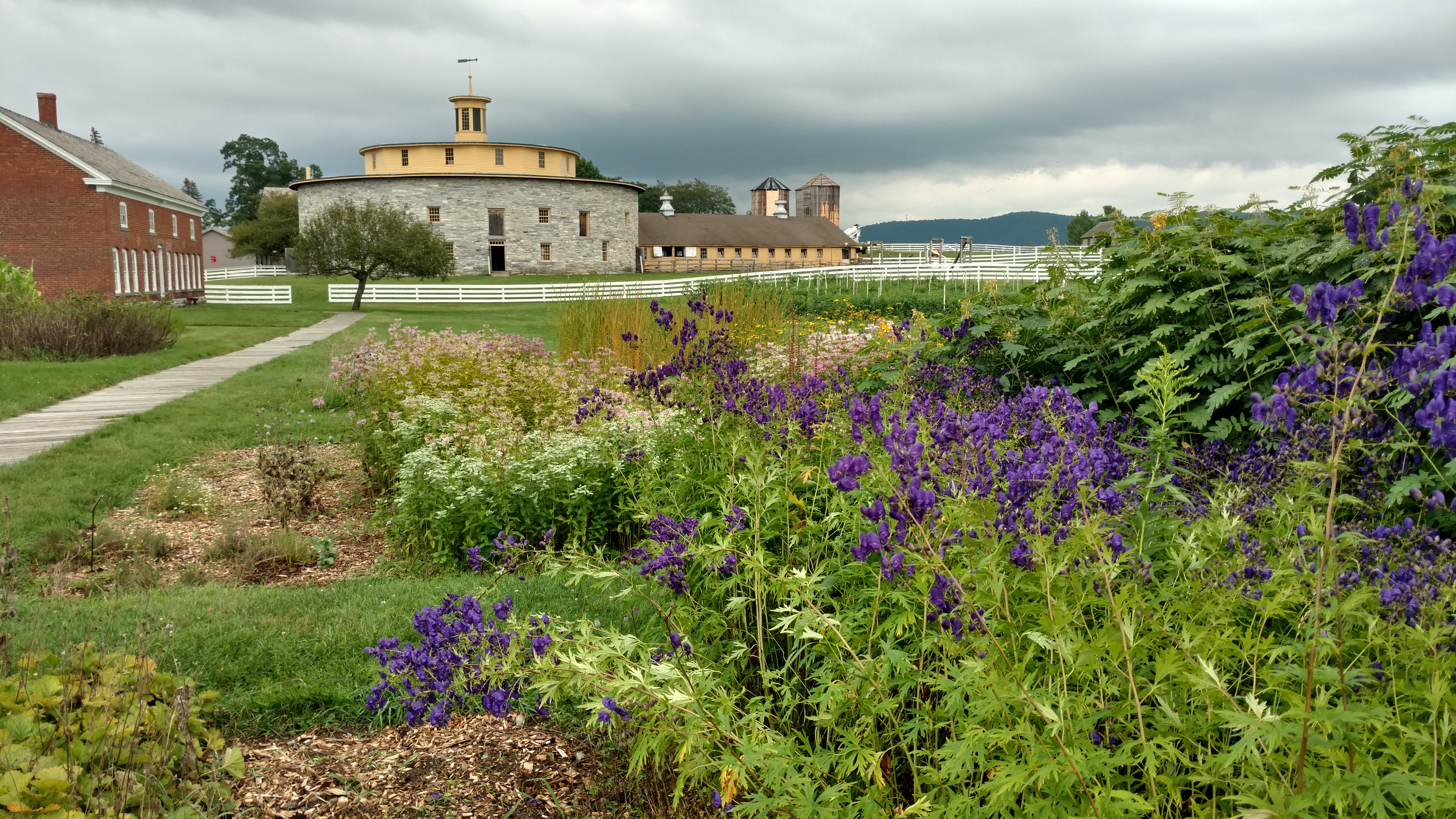
The round barn and farm fields

One of the most notable buildings in the village is the Round Stone Barn, built in 1826. That barn was built in a circular shape for several reasons, the primary one being that it was the most functional. It is one of few surviving round barns in the state.

Inside the barn there are four rings. The innermost ring provides ventilation, which is necessary to help draw the moisture up and out of the hay to prevent mold from growing and the hay from spontaneously combusting. The next ring out is where the hay was stored. It was tossed in from an upper-level balcony that was accessible by ox-drawn wagon via a ramp outdoors. Because the barn was round, the wagons could enter, unload the hay and then exit the barn without having to back up. The third ring was where the Shaker brothers would walk to distribute the hay from the second ring to the cows standing in the fourth (outermost) ring. The barn could hold up to 70 cows at a time. They would go to the barn twice a day: once in the morning and once in the evening to be milked. Inside the barn they were put into wooden stanchions. Standing there, the cows could eat while the brothers milked them. The floor of the outermost ring is split level, with the inner part raised up 3 inches (76 mm). This was to prevent the unsanitary situation of having the milk buckets on the same level as the manure. In addition, the Shakers developed a way of efficiently removing the manure from the complex to use it for compost. Approximately every four feet around the outermost ring was a trapdoor which was used to quickly scoop the manure from the floor into a pit beneath the barn. Other workers would then access this pit to transport the manure to their gardens to be used as fertilizer.

=== 1830 Brick Dwelling ===
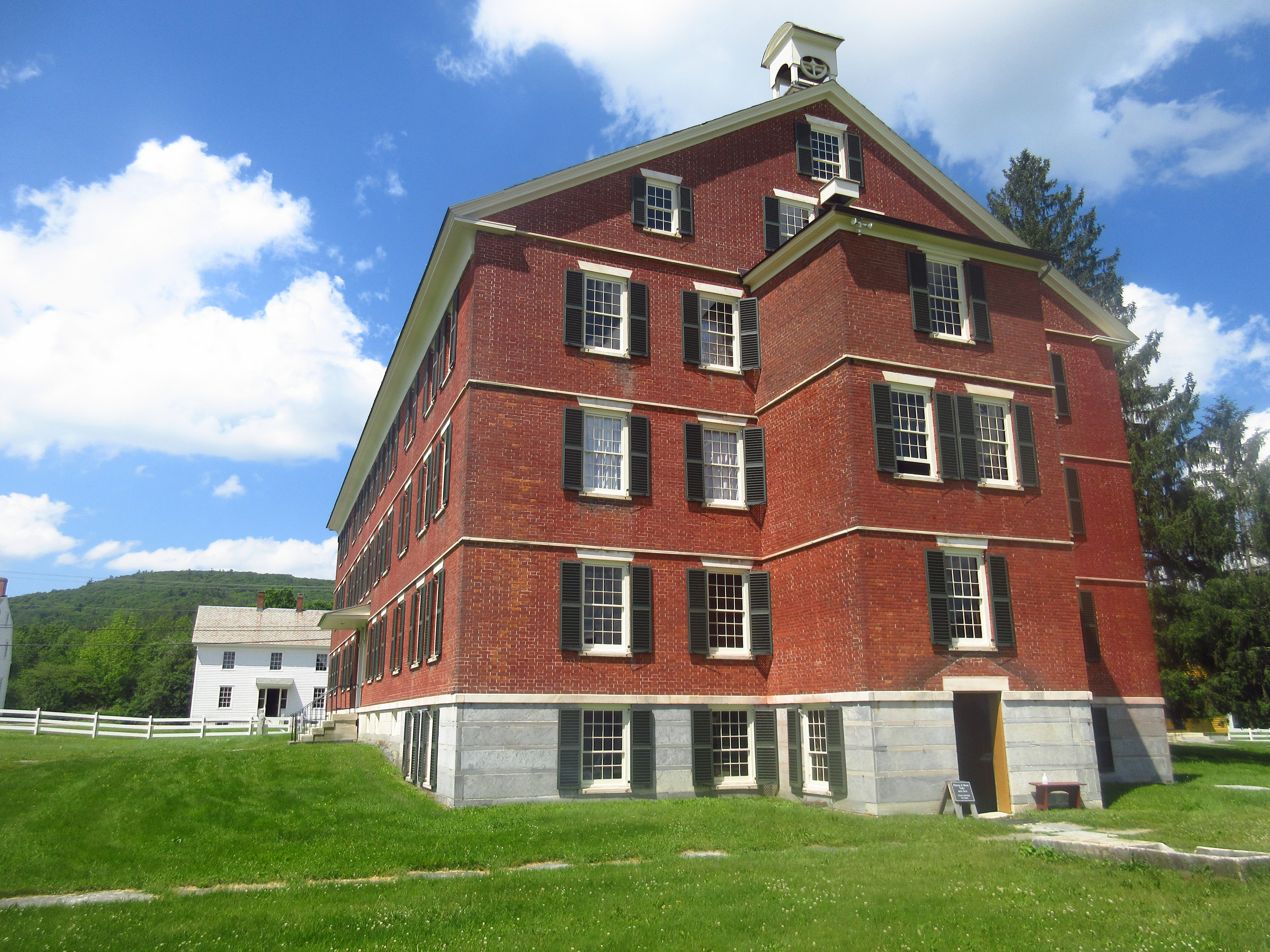
1830 dormitory building

The other iconic building is the large red-brick dwelling the Hancock Shakers built in 1830 to serve as dormitory housing for more than 100 brothers and sisters. The dwelling, like the barn, shows the Shakers' prosperity, as well as their appreciation of the benefits of space, ventilation, and labor-saving modern conveniences such as water piped indoors. The dwelling was a good advertisement for the creature comforts the society provided to its members. In modern times, visitors to the Hancock Shaker Village can experience authentic Shaker meals in the dining room in the Brick Dwelling. Though the guests are no longer required to separate by sex while they eat, the event maintains its authenticity with its use of sermons, songs, hymns, and reliance on natural and candle light.

The dwelling also shows how the sexes lived apart under one roof. Wide hallways separate the brethren's rooms from the sisters' rooms; separate doors and stairways for men and women meant that a sister never had to pass a brother going through those openings. Men and women ate at opposite ends of the dining room. The dwelling also has features unusual in habitations of their era; interior windows for borrowed light to illuminate an otherwise-dark stairwell, built-in cabinets and cases of drawers, dumb-waiters for moving food and dishes between the downstairs kitchen and the dining room on the floor above, an abundance of windows for light and ventilation. All of the windows in the building, rather than having a 90-degree angle with the wall, form a 45-degree (approx.) angle in the wall, which allows approximately 30 percent more light into the building allowing the people to experience more natural light.

== Museum ==
In 1960, the Shaker Central Ministry closed the Hancock community, and sold its buildings and land. Purchasers formed the not-for-profit Hancock Shaker Village, Inc. to preserve the historic site. The museum opened on July 1, 1961, and was added to the National Register of Historic Places in 1968. The museum's mission statement is "to bring the Shaker story to life and preserve it for future generations."

Over 60,000 people a year visit the museum between April and October. It has 20 historic buildings with over 22,000 artifacts, extensive gardens, a working farm, and hiking trails, and runs craft demonstrations. Several special celebrations take place throughout the season, including Baby Animals on the Shaker Farm in the spring and Country Fair in the fall.

== As film location ==
Hancock Shaker Village was included in Bob Vila's A&E Network production Guide to Historic Homes of America. On May 4, 2012, The Berkshire Eagle reported that Hancock Shaker Village was one of several local sites chosen for shooting in a low-budget thriller film, The Secret Village, with a climax at Hancock Village. The film crew shot scenes on-site on May 3, 2012. The 2025 film The Testament of Ann Lee also shot on location at the Hancock Shaker Village.

== See also ==
- National Register of Historic Places listings in Berkshire County, Massachusetts
- List of National Historic Landmarks in Massachusetts
