= Straight Creek (Ohio River tributary) =

Stream in Brown County, Ohio, United States of America

Coordinates: 38°46′21″N 83°54′56″W

Straight Creek is a stream entirely within Brown County, Ohio. It is a tributary of the Ohio River.

Despite its name, Straight Creek is straight in "name only".

== See also ==
- List of rivers of Ohio
