= Alfred Shaker Historic District =

Historic district in Maine, United States

- U.S. National Register of Historic Places
- U.S. Historic district
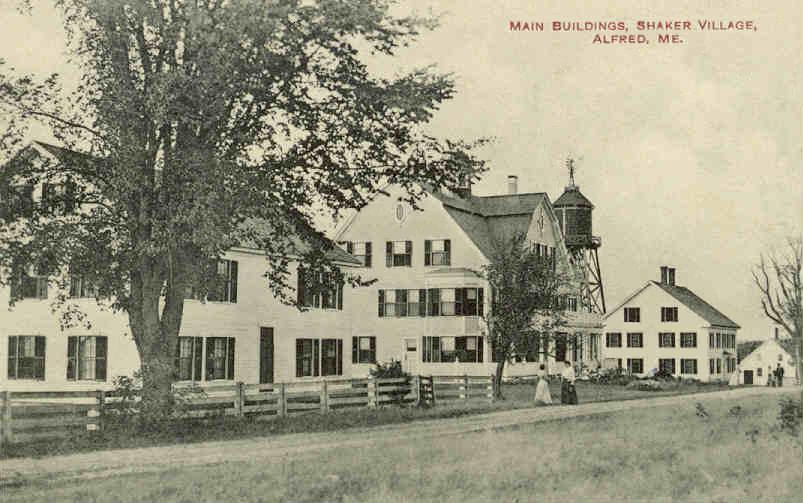
- Main buildings, Shaker Village; from a 1915 postcard
- Location: Shaker Hill Road. Alfred, Maine
- Coordinates: 43°29′55″N 70°42′41″W
- Architectural style: Federal
- NRHP reference No.: 01000371
- Added to NRHP: April 11, 2001

Shaker community
- Community: Alfred Shaker Historic District
- Dates: 1793-1931
- Bishopric: Alfred
- Spiritual name: Holy Ground
- Families: Church, Second, North
- Maximum population: 200 in 1823

Alfred Shaker Historic District is a historic district in Alfred, Maine, with properties on both sides of Shaker Hill Road. The area had its first Shaker "believers" in 1783 following visiting with Mother Ann Lee and became an official community starting in 1793 when a meetinghouse was built. It was home to Maine's oldest and largest Shaker community. Two notable events were the songwriting of Joseph Brackett, including, according to most accounts, Simple Gifts, and the spiritual healing of the sick by the Shakers. When the Alfred Shakers products and goods were no longer competitive with mass-produced products and the membership had dwindled significantly, the village was closed in 1931 and members moved to Sabbathday Lake Shaker Village, also in Maine.

In memory of the influence that the Shaker village had on the community, the Shaker Village Museum was founded by the Friends of the Alfred Shaker Museum and in 2001 the village, or historic district, was added to the National Register of Historic Places.

In 1931 the farmland, village and buildings were acquired by the Brothers of Christian Instruction, now called the Notre Dame Spiritual Center.

== Shaker village ==
=== History ===
John Cotton, having been inspired by Mother Ann Lee on May 26, 1783, became Maine's first Shaker member. That year members of the Shaker Church settled on the hill near Massabesic (now Shaker) Pond. Others dubbed them the "Merry Dancers", because of their ecstatic worship. "They were", as historian George J. Varney writes, "at this time fanatical in religion and intemperate in their indulgences."

The Shaker village was formally organized in 1793 when a meetinghouse was built. The community practiced the religion's celibate communal living, with equality among the sexes and races. They built plain architecture and furniture, honest expressions of their faith. At the movement's height in the 1840s, Shakers operated 19 utopian communities scattered from Maine to Kentucky, and as far west as Indiana.

Each of those communities was administratively organized within an area bishopric, and Alfred was the home of the Maine bishopric elders and eldresses, who traveled regularly between Alfred, Poland Hill, and New Gloucester to oversee those villages' elders and eldresses. In 1848, the Alfred, Maine bishopric ministry included Elder Joseph Brackett and Eldress Rebecca Hodgdon, and their assistants Otis Sawyer and Deborah Fuller. Elder Joseph Brackett is attributed by many Shaker accounts to have written the famous 1848 Shaker dancing song, Simple Gifts. In 1880, the Maine ministry consisted of Elder Otis Sawyer and Eldress Hester Ann Adams, assisted by Mary Gillespie and John Vance.

Hundreds of people lived at the 300-acre Shaker village on both sides of Shaker Hill Road, which included a school, gardens, orchards, a grist and saw mill, farm land, barns, a dairy and shops. They made brooms, brushes, woven cloth, woodenware, spinning wheels, horsehair sieves, oval carriers and fancy goods. They reaped seeds and herbs and made herbal medicines. Key intentions among the Shakers were to live a simple life in harmony, respect nature, and produce well-made or cared for agricultural or material products. The village made a number of goods and products and was noted for "spiritualistic healing of the sick," but the daily operations were difficult to manage and the village was not economically successful due to the competition of manufactured goods.

By the end of the nineteenth century, the community consisted mainly of devoted women and the membership dwindled as members died. In 1920, a revival was led by Harriet Coolbroth and Mary Ann Walker to bolster the number of members, which resulted in a fervent community for several years.

In March 1931 the number of Shakers at Alfred had dwindled and the remaining individuals moved to the Sabbathday Lake Shaker Village. The Alfred Shaker Historic District is preserved and listed on the National Register of Historic Places since 2001. Only Sabbathday Lake Shaker Village in New Gloucester survives under the control of the last few Shakers. Some former communities operate today as museums because, like Alfred Shaker Village, they closed when the congregation dwindled.

Artist Joshua Bussell was long a resident of the Alfred community.

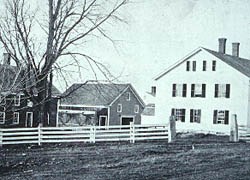
Historic buildings, Alfred Shaker Village, Maine, c. 1880

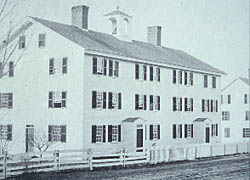
Historic building, Alfred Shaker Village, Maine, c. 1880

=== Alfred Shaker Museum ===
The Alfred Shaker Museum, located in a gatehouse of the previous Shaker village, was founded by local residents who had organized the Friends of Alfred Shaker Museum to preserve the Shaker heritage within the community. Within the renovated Carriage House is a library, shop and the museum that conducts periodic craft workshops, events and exhibits.

== Brothers of Christian Instruction ==
In 1931, the Alfred property was sold to the Brothers of Christian Instruction, and is called the Notre Dame Spiritual Center. They have managed the farm and occupied the village buildings. Although the Shakers are gone, some of their apple orchards and blueberry fields are still yielding fruit, the sale of which helps support the York County Shelter.

== See also ==
- National Register of Historic Places listings in York County, Maine
