= Enfield Shakers Historic District (Connecticut) =

Historic district in Connecticut, United States

- U.S. National Register of Historic Places
- U.S. Historic district
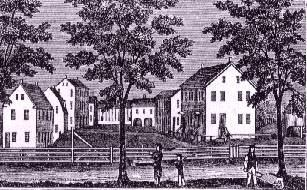

- Location within Connecticut Location within the United States
- Location: Shaker, Taylor and Cybulski Roads, Enfield, Connecticut
- Coordinates: 42°0′42″N 72°30′57″W
- Area: 110 acres (45 ha)
- Built: 1827; 199 years ago
- NRHP reference No.: 79002663
- Added to NRHP: May 21, 1979

Shaker community
- Community: Enfield Shaker Village (Connecticut)
- Dates: 1792-1917
- Bishopric: Hancock
- Spiritual name: City of Union
- Families: Church, North, South, East, West
- Maximum population: 215 in 1850

The Enfield Shakers Historic District encompasses some of the surviving remnants of a former Shaker community in Enfield, Connecticut. Founded in the 1780s, the Enfield Shaker community remained active until 1917. The surviving buildings of their once large community complexes are located in and around Taylor Road in northeastern Enfield, and were listed as a historic district on the National Register of Historic Places in 1979. The listing included 15 contributing buildings and one contributing site.

== History ==
The Enfield Shaker community was the only Shaker settlement in Connecticut (others were in Massachusetts, New Hampshire, New York, Indiana, Ohio, Kentucky) and was significant for its garden-seed business. The Enfield settlement, was founded in the 1780s, and lasted until 1917. There were three distinct centers of development, called "families" by the Shakers. In 1930, 1600 acres of the former settlement were purchased by the State of Connecticut to establish a new prison farm[3]; eventually becoming the state's largest prison complex.

The district included all 15 buildings that survive, out of about six times as many existing in 1917. In 1978, the surviving buildings include a meetinghouse, a large brick residence, an ice house, five barns, a sawmill, a slaughterhouse, a laundry, and several workshops, in three village-like clusters. Most of these buildings date to the period 1830–60, when the community was at its height. These buildings, as well as a portion of Shaker-developed landscape are located mainly on the west side of Taylor Road between Moody Road in the south and Sandhill Road to the north. A few buildings are on Cybulski Road north of Moody, nearly surrounded by modern development.

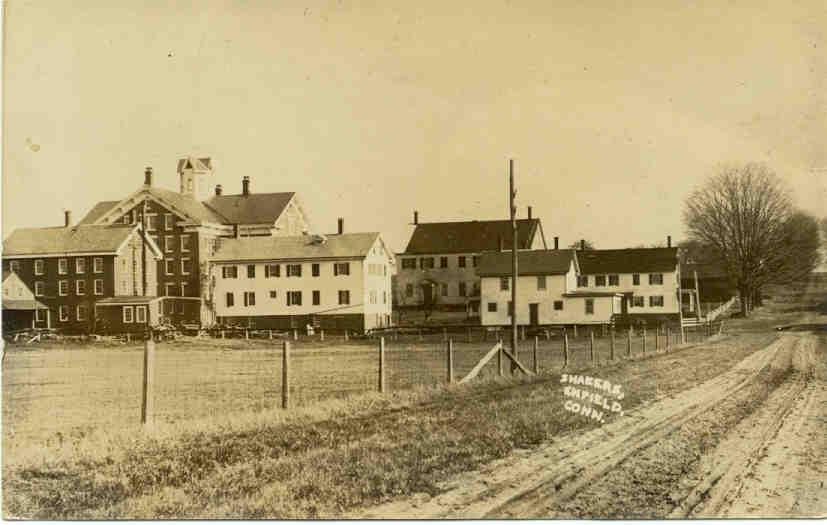
Enfield community, c. 1910

== See also ==
- Shaker Seed Company
- National Register of Historic Places listings in Hartford County, Connecticut
