= Brackett (surname) =

Brackett is a surname. Notable people with the surname include:

- Anna Brackett (1836–1911), American philosopher, translator, and educator
- Bert Brackett (born 1944) American politician
- Brett Brackett, American football player
- Bruce Godfrey Brackett (1915–1943), American naval aviator
- Charles Brackett (1892–1969), American screenwriter and producer
- Chris Brackett, archer
- Clayton Brackett (born 1993), American wheelchair rugby player
- Deke Brackett (1911–1970), college football player and coach
- Edgar T. Brackett (1853–1924), American lawyer and politician
- Edward Augustus Brackett (1818–1908) American sculptor, poet, and conservationist
- Elizabeth Brackett (1941–2018), Chicago-based correspondent and TV host
- Frank Parkhurst Brackett (1865–1951), American professor of astronomy
- Frederick Sumner Brackett (1896–1988), American physicist and spectroscopist
- Gary Brackett (born 1980), American football player
- John Q. A. Brackett (1842–1918), Governor of Massachusetts, 1890–91
- Joseph Brackett (1797–1882), American songwriter
- Leigh Brackett (1915–1978), American novelist and screenwriter
- Marc Brackett, director of the Yale Center for Emotional Intelligence
- Sarah Brackett, American/Scottish actress
- Sean Brackett, American football player
- Walter M. Brackett (1823–1919), American painter
- Ward Brackett (1914–2006), American book and magazine artist
