= Brackett =

Brackett may refer to:

- Brackett (surname)
- Brackett (crater), a lunar crater named after Frederick Sumner Brackett
- Brackett Field, public airport in La Verne, California
- Brackett, Wisconsin, an unincorporated community in Eau Claire County, Wisconsin

== See also ==
- Brackett series, a series of absorption or emission lines of hydrogen, discovered by Frederick Sumner Brackett
- Brackett House (disambiguation)
- Bracket (disambiguation)
- Brockett
