= Steinway D-274 =

Grand piano made by Steinway

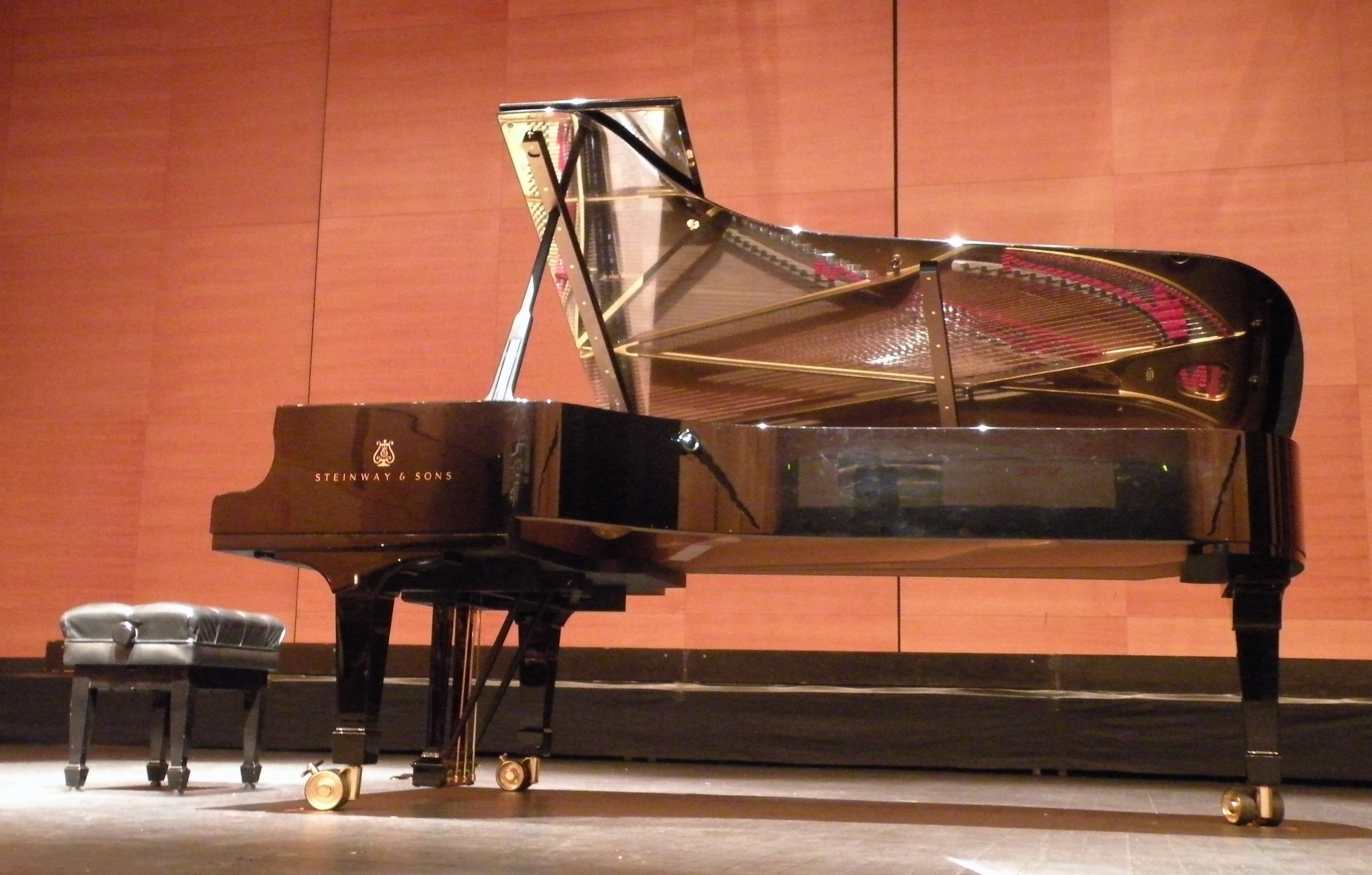
D-274 that exemplifies the products of Steinway's factory in Hamburg, Germany

D-274 (or D) is a grand piano manufactured by the Steinway & Sons piano company, first built in 1884. It is the flagship concert grand piano used in many major concert halls worldwide. According to Steinway & Sons, over 90 percent of soloists performing with major orchestras choose a Steinway, though music critics note this figure is influenced by the exclusive presence of Steinway instruments in many venues. As of 2017 a D-274 finished in Polished Ebony has a MSRP of US$175,700.

== Design ==
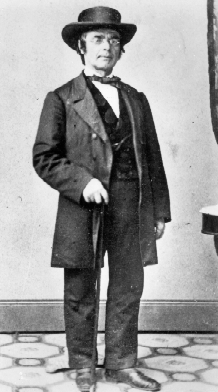
Studio photo of Henry E. Steinway taken by Mathew Brady

Most design elements of the Steinway 'D' were developed during the 19th century. Among them are the action and string scale designs refined by Henry Steinway Jr., the company founder's son. Since those early years, only two notable improvements to the model have been made: a concentric shaping of the soundboard, a design patented by younger family member Paul Bilhuber, was introduced in 1936. More recently the action was changed to provide a greater mechanical advantage to the player, resulting in less touch resistance with no loss of power.

== History ==
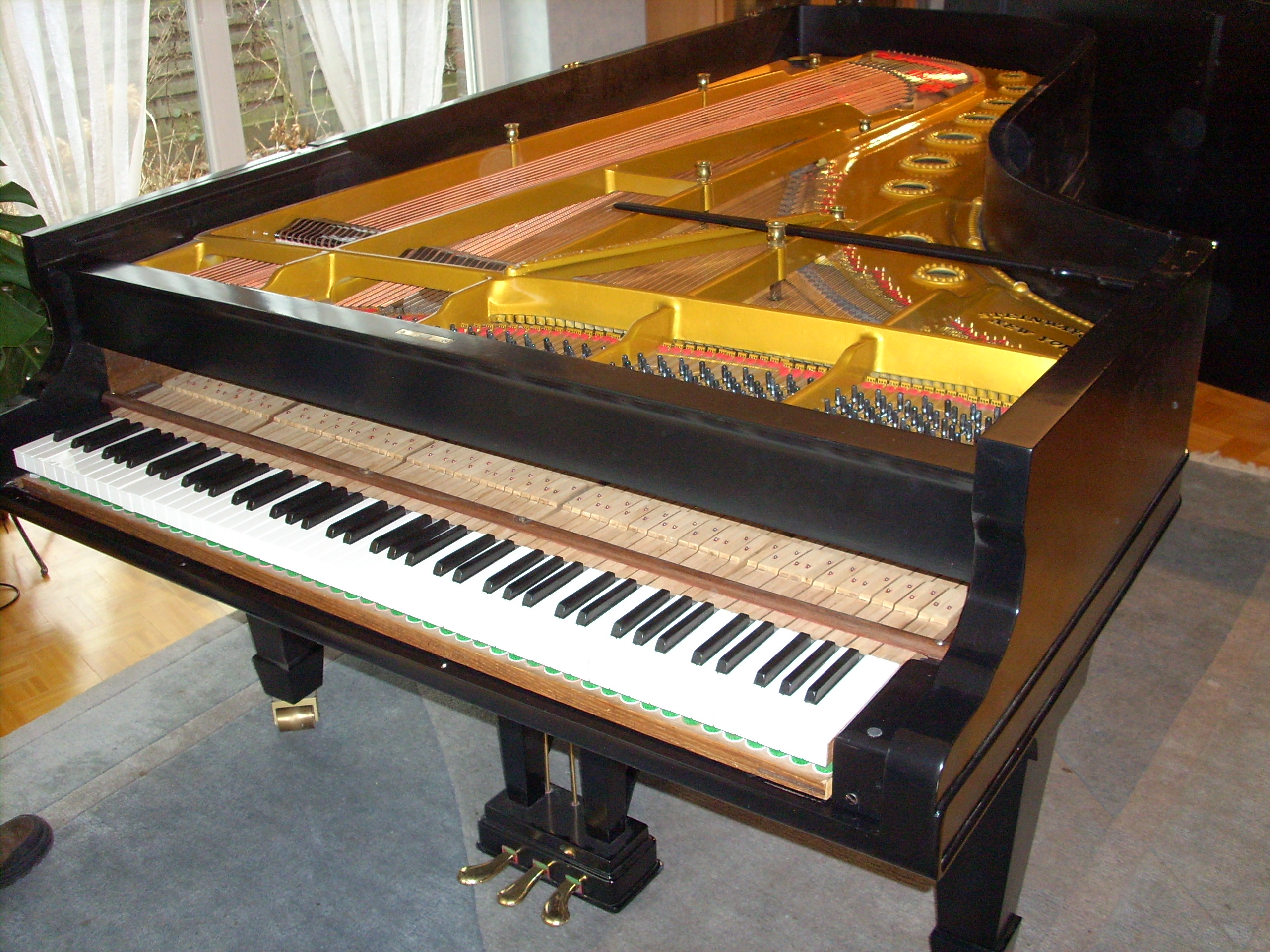
Early Centennial D-270 built Sept 1877 (constructed case) being erected after transport

Concert grand pianos of full size are able to fill a concert hall with sound for 2,000 to 3,000 spectators. This was foreshadowed in the 1860s when grand pianos were given harps or frames of cast iron. Initially employed to accommodate the cumulative and extraordinary tension of the strings, thereby protecting the wooden structure from destruction, iron frames quickly facilitated a dramatic increase in string tension. With increased string tension came increased power and projection.

At the 1876 Centennial Exposition in Philadelphia, Pennsylvania, there were several manufacturer's competitions, including a piano competition. The Steinway company sent two grand pianos displaying their latest developments. They left the world exhibition with a gold medal. Steinway won the competition against several more established piano makers, including Chickering & Sons and Weber Piano Company

This Steinway concert grand piano, the direct predecessor of today's Model 'D', has become known as the "Centennial grand". It remained in production until 1878, when refinements prompted them to re-designate their models, replacing numeric designations (Types 1 through 4) with Model letters, i.e., A, B, C and D.

During this period, Steinway modified the Model D by introducing a full-perimeter cast-iron plate over the pinblock, integrating a capo d'astro bar into the upper treble, and reinforcing the pedal lyre as a self-contained unit. Combined with increased string tension and heavier, denser hammers, these structural changes reduced manufacturing costs while increasing the instrument's volume and projection for larger concert halls.

== Development of the modern D-274 ==
Steinway Artist Daniel Barenboim, age 11, plays a D-274 with the conductor Moshe Lustig and the Gadna symphony orchestra in Israel on August 1st, 1953

In 1878, Steinway began producing their new small Models 'A' and 'B' with laminated maple cabinets, creating the modern "rim" case: long, thin (3.5 mm) planks of maple were slathered with hide glue, bent around a form, clamped together and allowed to dry. This process made rim fabrication quicker, and the resultant structure stronger and more stable. It also was cheaper, requiring fewer man-hours and being less wasteful of hardwoods that need several years of storage and precise seasoning.

In 1880, the two big grand models 'C' and 'D' were changed accordingly. Both received the 'rim' case. Among extant Centennial grands (1875-1884), approximately two-thirds have a 'constructed case' and the newer third have a bent rim case.

After the concert success of an 1883 prototype 'D', Steinway unveiled the 1884 'D', a fully realized new model with a redesigned scale (including a 20-note instead of a 17-note bass), a capo bar in both upper treble sections, a newly designed pedal lyre, and a multi-laminated case.

In subsequent years few changes occurred, though the instrument's length increased slightly. However, in 1936 a soundboard based on a patent of Paul Bilhuber, an "in-law" member of the Steinway family, was introduced. Bilhuber had created a soundboard that tapered evenly from the thickest central point to a thinner perimeter.

Of the approximately 600,000 pianos Steinway has built (as of 2010), about 25,000 are Models 'D'. Only 424 of the predecessor "Centennial D" pianos were built; about 30 are still known to exist.

== Special editions and price record ==
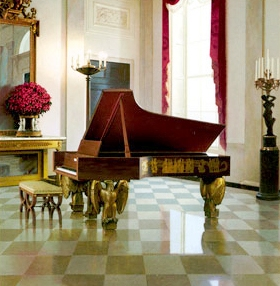
The specially designed D-274 in the White House

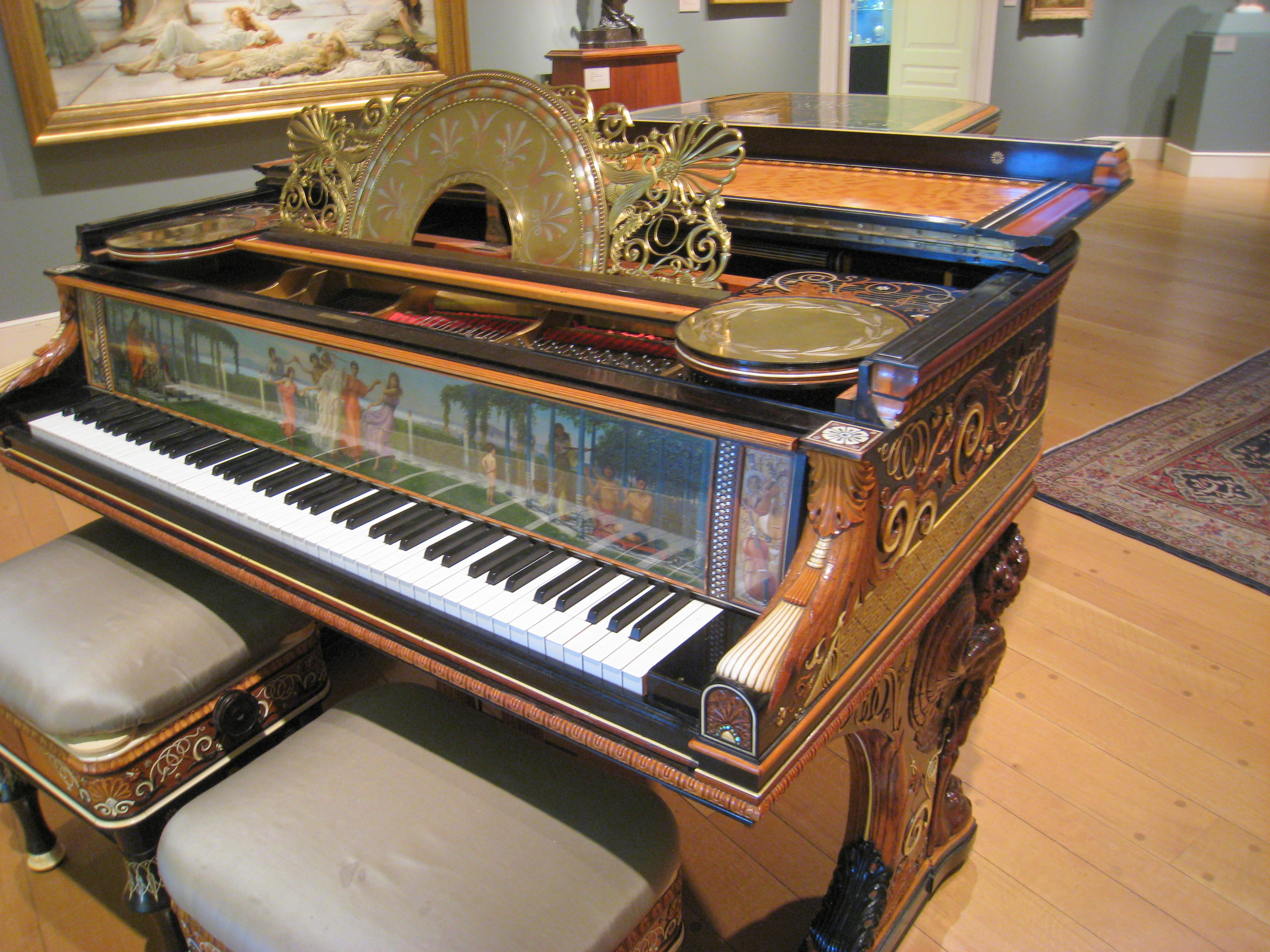
The specially designed D-274 Steinway Alma Tadema, which is the world's most expensive grand piano sold at auction

Over the years, Steinway has produced a small number of special or limited editions of the D-274. Custom-built D-274s have also been made; for example the "fully crystallized" D-274s with over a million individually positioned Swarovski crystals covering each piano.

The White House has a specially designed D-274, which is normally placed in the largest room of the White House, the East Room. The 2002 White House Christmas card features this piano.

The world's most expensive grand piano sold at auction is a specially designed D-274 named Steinway Alma Tadema; it sold for $1.2 million in 1997 at Christie's in London, breaking Steinway's own 1997 price record of $390,000. The D-274 was built in 1883–87 and designed by Sir Lawrence Alma-Tadema. It is displayed at the art museum Clark Art Institute. In 2006, Steinway recreated an exacting replica of this piano.

== Recordings ==
The D-274 has featured in numerous recordings spanning a wide array of genres and the whole of the history of sound recording. The following list includes some relatively recent examples in a variety of mostly advanced formats, including classical, folk, blues, and new-age albums; one high-end audio test disc; and a celebrated fraud:

- Lang Lang – Rachmaninoff: Piano Concerto No. 3 / Scriabin: Etudes. Sergei Rachmaninoff: Piano Concerto No. 3 (Hamburg Steinway D-274; with Saint Petersburg Philharmonic Orchestra, Yuri Temirkanov cond.); Alexander Scriabin: Etudes (New York Steinway D-274). Telarc hybrid SACD 60582.
- Piano Duo Trenkner/Speidel – Johann Sebastian Bach (arr. Max Reger): Brandenburg Concerti. (Four-hands arrangements performed on a 1901 Steinway D-274) MD&G 330 0635–2.
- Yoram Ish-Hurwitz – Isaac Albéniz: Iberia. Turtle Records hybrid SACDs TRSA 0029 (books I and II) and TR75530 (books III and IV).
- Rachmaninoff Plays Rachmaninoff. RCA Victor 748971 (Recreations by Zenph Studios of performances by Sergei Rachmaninoff drawn from earlier conventional records; the company's Internet site prominently features the instrument used, a 1909 Steinway D-274, no. 133,201, retrofitted with a computerized self-playing mechanism).
- Antoine Rebstein – Piano Left Hand Recital. Claves 50-2502 (Compositions for left hand alone by J.S. Bach arr. Johannes Brahms, Camille Saint-Saëns, Dinu Lipatti, Alexander Scriabin, Erwin Schulhoff, and Johann Strauss II arr. Leopold Godowsky, recorded on Steinway D 479 580).
- John Gorka – A Gypsy Life (piano performances by Susan Werner). AIX Records Blu-ray Disc 83053 (video and HD Audio).
- Marcel Worms – Red White & Blues: 32 New Dutch Blues Pieces (1996-2006) (all tracks feature the Hamburg Steinway D-274), Attacca Records 27103–4.
- Gary Girouard – The Naked Piano volumes I-III, Galileo Music Corporation.
- Robert Silverman – Johannes Brahms: Intermezzo in E-Flat major, op. 117 no. 1; Mozart: Minuet in G (both on a New York Steinway D-274). Tracks 11 and 12 of Stereophile Test CD 2.
- Joyce Hatto – Recordings issued under her name on the Concert Artist Recordings label were said to be recorded on a 1923 Hamburg Steinway D, Serial No 217355, but in fact were unauthorized dubs of recordings by other pianists.

The D-274 has also featured in many television programs, including:

- The Super Bowl XLIV on February 7, 2010, was opened with a music video with a performance by Rihanna, Jay-Z, E.S. Posthumus and the Rutgers Symphony Orchestra. The D-274, which is heard and seen especially in the beginning of the music video, was supplied from the Concert & Artist division of Steinway, located at Steinway Hall on Manhattan, New York City.
- In the 2009 Nobel Peace Prize Award Ceremony for U.S. President Barack Obama on December 10, 2009, Steinway Artist Lang Lang performed on a D-274 Liebesträume by Franz Liszt.
- The inauguration ceremony for US President Barack Obama on January 20, 2009, featured a performance of John Williams's composition Air and Simple Gifts by cellist Yo-Yo Ma, violinist Itzhak Perlman, pianist Gabriela Montero and clarinetist Anthony McGill. Gabriela Montero played on a D-274.
- On The Ellen DeGeneres Show on November 17, 2008, seven-year-old child prodigy Emily Bear played on a D-274 her own composition called Once Upon A Wish dedicated for Ellen DeGeneres's and Portia de Rossi's wedding.
- In NBC's Today Show on October 18, 2007, Lola Astanova played a D-274.
- In a nationally televised commercial aired in Fall 2007, Texas Christian University uses its status as an All-Steinway School to promote itself. The commercial shows a D-274.
- In an Emmy nominated television commercial for Mercedes-Benz produced by Gerard De Thame in 2001, a new modern Noah's Ark is shown. This new Noah's Ark has been loaded with two of different sorts of animals, but also with luxury products from the world of today. One of these luxury products is a D-274 filmed from an angle so that the Steinway logo is clearly seen.

== See also ==
- List of piano manufacturers
- List of piano brand names
