= Brockett =

Brockett is a surname, and may refer to:

- Chloe Brockett, English television personality
- Don Brockett, American actor, comedian, producer and director
- Jamie Brockett, New England-based folk singer
- John Brockett (disambiguation), multiple people
- John Trotter Brockett (1788–1842), British attorney, antiquarian, numismatist, and philologist
- Lawrence Brockett (1724–1768), Regius Professor of Modern History at Cambridge University
- Roger W. Brockett, professor of computer science, founded the Harvard Robotics Laboratory in 1983

== See also ==
- Brocket (disambiguation)
- Brackett (disambiguation)
