= Simple Gifts =

Traditional Shaker song written by Elder Joseph Brackett

- Genre: Shaker music, dance music
- Text: attr. Joseph Brackett
- Language: English
- Meter: Irregular with refrain
- Composed: 1848

Simple Gifts Pendyrus Choir
Choral performance of Pendyrus Choir

"Simple Gifts" is a Shaker song written and composed in 1848, generally attributed to Elder Joseph Brackett from Alfred Shaker Village. It became widely known when Aaron Copland used its melody for the score of Martha Graham's ballet Appalachian Spring, which premiered in 1944.

== Background and composition ==
The tune and lyrics were written by Elder Joseph Brackett (1797–1882) of the Alfred, Maine Shaker community, although there is some disagreement as to which community Elder Joseph belonged to when the song was written. Elder Joseph resided with the Sabbathday Lake Shaker Village in New Gloucester, Maine community before he was called to serve in the Ministry in 1848. For the next decade, he served the Community in Alfred, later returning to New Gloucester. However, the Alfred community's history makes no reference to "Simple Gifts", although there are several mentions of Elder Joseph.

The first known reference to "Simple Gifts" is an advertisement for a concert in October 1848 by the Shaker Family from the Society of Shakers of New Gloucester, Maine.

== Resurgence and enduring popularity ==
External videos
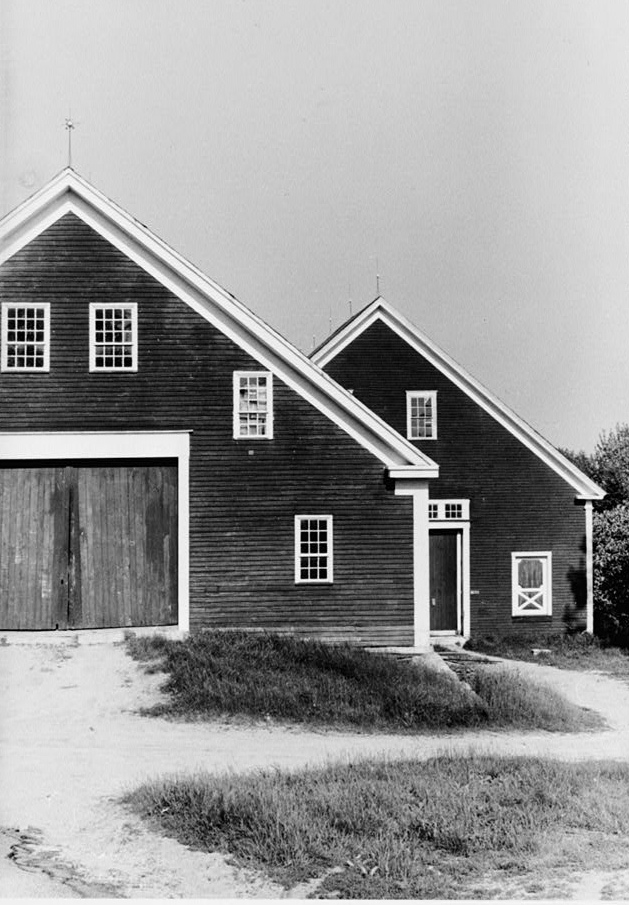
- 'Tis a Gift to be Simple -- Shaker folk song, 2:04, Saint Andrews Episcopal Church, Seattle
- I Danced in the Morning (LORD OF THE DANCE), 3:55, First-Plymouth Church Lincoln Nebraska-Videos

The song was largely unknown outside Shaker communities until Aaron Copland used its melody for the score of Martha Graham's ballet, Appalachian Spring, first performed in 1944. (Shakers once worshipped on Holy Mount, in the Massachusetts portion of the Appalachians). Copland used "Simple Gifts" a second time in 1950 in his first set of Old American Songs for voice and piano, which was later orchestrated. In June 2026, CBS News included the song in its list of the 250 essential American songs of the past 250 years.

== Lyrics ==
Copland used Brackett's original verse for the lyrics to his one-verse song:

'Tis the gift to be simple, 'tis the gift to be free
'Tis the gift to come down where we ought to be,
And when we find ourselves in the place just right,
'Twill be in the valley of love and delight.
When true simplicity is gained,
To bow and to bend we shan’t be ashamed,
To turn, turn will be our delight,
Till by turning, turning we come 'round right.

Several Shaker manuscripts indicate that this is a "dancing song" or a "quick dance". "Turning" is a common theme in Christian theology, but the references to "turning" in the last two lines have also been identified as dance instructions. When the traditional dance is performed properly, each dancer ends up where they started, "come 'round right".

== Tune ==
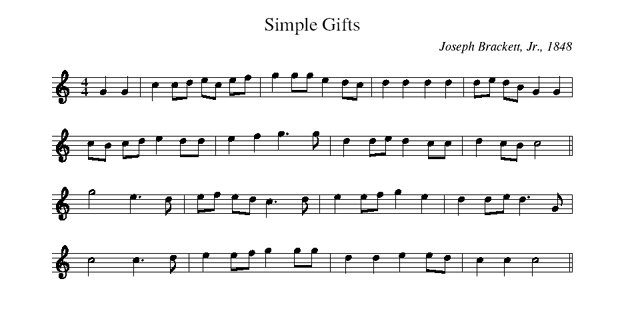

A manuscript of Mary Hazzard of the New Lebanon, New York Shaker community records this original version of the melody.

The song resembles, to a slight extent, several repetitions of the opening measures of William Byrd's renaissance composition, "The Barley Break", which Byrd intended to imitate country children playing a folk game.

A somewhat similar musical theme arises also in a brass ensemble work, Canzon per sonare no. 2, by Giovanni Gabrieli (c.1555–1612).

=== "Lord of the Dance" ===
English songwriter Sydney Carter adapted the original American Shaker tune and lyrics for his hymn "Lord of the Dance" published and copyrighted in 1963.

The Carter hymn is also titled "I Am the Lord of the Dance" and "I Danced in the Morning".

In 1996, the Carter hymn was adapted without authorization or acknowledgments of the origins of the tune or Carter's lyrics by Ronan Hardiman for Michael Flatley's dance musical, Lord of the Dance. The melody is used at various points throughout the show, including the piece entitled "Lord of the Dance". The musical's title and version of the "Lord of the Dance" have led to some confusion that the song and lyrics are Celtic; however they are of American and English origin.

== Subsequent usage ==
- Judy Collins included the song on her 1970 album, Whales & Nightingales.
- The song is incorporated into both the opening and closing tracks of the 1990 album Simple Gifts: Instrumental Arrangements of Shaker Melodies by William Coulter and Barry Phillips.
- Yo-Yo Ma recorded a duet with singer/songwriter Alison Krauss, originally released on his 2001 album Classic Yo-Yo, re-released on the 2005 album Essential Yo-Yo Ma, and later included in Apple Music's compilation, Yo-Yo Ma Essentials.
- An instrumental rendition of "Simple Gifts" was played as the Olympic Flag entered Centennial Olympic Stadium during the opening ceremony of the 1996 Summer Olympics in Atlanta.
- John P. Zdechlik used "Simple Gifts" in "Chorale and Shaker Dance", a 1972 composition for concert band. In 2004, Robert Steadman arranged the tune for orchestra featuring an off-stage trumpet and a thumping, dance-music influenced finale.
- Frank Ticheli composed a variation of "Simple Gifts", presented in Simple Gifts: Four Shaker Songs.
- The 1967 album Happy Together by The Turtles includes the song "Too Young to Be One", which Eric Eisner adapted from "Simple Gifts."
- The central melody of "Simple Gifts" is used in the 2009 song The Sound Above My Hair by German electronic music group Scooter, which utilises bagpipes in the composition.
- The 2008 song "The Greatest Man That Ever Lived (Variations on a Shaker Hymn)" by Weezer makes extensive use of the "Simple Gifts" melody throughout.
- The Santa Clara Vanguard Drum and Bugle Corps made use of the "Simple Gifts" melody throughout their 2009 production, "Ballet for Martha".
- The Pride of West Virginia has included the song in its pregame show for every game the band is at since 1973.

=== In popular culture ===
- John Williams composed a variation for cello, violin, clarinet, and piano titled Air and Simple Gifts. The variation was written specifically for Barack Obama's Inauguration on January 20, 2009. It was performed by Anthony McGill, Itzhak Perlman, Yo-Yo Ma, and Gabriela Montero.
- Icelandic singer Jónsi covered the song for the 2017 film, The Circle.
- Several arrangements by composer Rick Krizman were composed for the tabloid news series, American Journal.
- For many years, an excerpt was used as the opening theme for the CBS News television documentary series, CBS Reports
- It was used in the 1963 Boulting Brothers' film, Heavens Above!.
- Hannibal Heyes (Pete Duel) sings the song in Alias Smith and Jones in the 1971 (second season) episode, "The Posse That Wouldn't Quit".
- The song is performed in the 1990 Shining Time Station Christmas episode 'Tis a Gift.
- A version is performed in a Simply Potatoes ad from 2017.
- The melody appears prominently in the score of the 2023 Bluey episode Relax.
- The melody appears in the movie Wake Up Dead Man, where it is played by Simone Vivane, a cellist character in the movie.

== Additional verses ==
Three additional, later non-Shaker verses exist for the song, as follows:

'Tis the gift to be loved and that love to return,
'Tis the gift to be taught and a richer gift to learn,
And when we expect of others what we try to live each day,
Then we'll all live together and we'll all learn to say,
(refrain)
'Tis the gift to have friends and a true friend to be,
'Tis the gift to think of others not to only think of "me",
And when we hear what others really think and really feel,
Then we'll all live together with a love that is real.
(refrain)
Tis the gift to be loving, tis the best gift of all
Like a quiet rain it blesses where it falls
And with it we will truly believe
Tis better to give than it is to receive

And an additional alternative:

The Earth is our mother and the fullness thereof,
Her streets, her slums, as well as stars above.
Salvation is here where we laugh, where we cry,
Where we seek and love, where we live and die.

When true liberty is found,
By fear and by hate we will no more be bound.
In love and in light we will find our new birth
And in peace and freedom, redeem the Earth.

Another alternate verse:

'tis a gift to be simple, 'tis a gift to be fair
'tis a gift to wake and breathe the morning air
and each day we walk on the path that we choose
'tis a gift we pray we never shall lose

A Version Broadcast During Music and the Spoken Word:

'Tis the gift to be simple
'Tis the gift to be free
'Tis the gift to come down where we ought to be
And when we find ourselves in the place just right
'Twill be in the valley of love and delight

Chorus:
When true simplicity is gained
To bow and to bend, we shan't be ashamed
To turn, turn, will be our delight
'Til by turning, turning, we come round right

'Tis a gift to be simple
'Tis a gift to be true
'Tis a gift to labor 'til the day is through
And when we find ourselves in the place so fine
'Twill be in the cool of the birch and the pine

(chorus)

'Tis a gift to be joyful
'Tis a gift to be free
'Tis a gift, 'tis a gift, 'tis a simple gift to be
And when you find yourself in the pure delight
The gift to be simple has led you alright

(chorus)

(chorus)

In the place just right
In the place just right
'Til by turning, turning, we come round right
