= Bowdoin International Music Festival =

- Genre: Classical
- Locations: Brunswick, Maine, USA
- Years active: 1964-Present
- Founders: Robert Beckwith, Lewis Kaplan
- Website: http://www.bowdoinfestival.org

The Bowdoin International Music Festival is an annual summer music school and concert series that takes place in Brunswick, Maine. Founded in 1964 as a program of Bowdoin College, it has operated as an independent nonprofit organization since 1997.

== Concert Series ==
During its six-week season, the Festival presents 20 concerts in four professional series and more than 200 Young Artists Series Performances, Community Concerts, masterclasses, studio classes, and lectures.

Regular faculty and guests include the Ying Quartet, Yefim Bronfman, Paul Katz, Brentano Quartet, Borromeo String Quartet, Emanuel Ax, Glenn Dicterow, Igor Begelman, Shanghai Quartet, and other musicians.

== History ==
In May 1964, Bowdoin College Music Department chair Robert K. Beckwith invited Lewis Kaplan to propose a summer concert series to take place at the College that summer. Kaplan was known at the time as the founder and leader of the Aeolian Chamber Players, a mixed-timbre chamber ensemble that performed both classical and contemporary music. Kaplan was also asked to design a summer music school for the following summer. Thus the Bowdoin College Summer Music Festival was born.

After a successful first summer of concerts, the Aeolian Chamber Players returned in 1965 with 19 students and a cadre of contemporary composers, including Elliott Carter, Meyer Kupferman, George Rochberg, and Morton Subotnick. Thus began the Festival's contemporary music component, which came in time to be known as the Charles E. Gamper Festival, after its chief patron. In 1966, George Crumb made the first of many appearances for the world premiere of his Eleven Echoes of Autumn, 1965.

The Bowdoin Festival grew rapidly as a program of the Bowdoin College Music Department through the 70's, 80's, and 90's, changing its name along the way to the Bowdoin Summer Music Festival. In 1997, the Festival became an independent non-profit organization, and in 2004 changed its name to Bowdoin International Music Festival. Kaplan continued as the Festival's director through its 2014 season, when the Festival celebrated its 50th summer as a teaching and presenting institution.

In September 2014, David and Phillip Ying, members of the famed Ying Quartet, became the Festival's Artistic Co-Directors.
