= Avery Fisher Career Grant =

American music award

The Avery Fisher Career Grant, established by Avery Fisher, is an award given to up to five outstanding instrumentalists each year (since 2004, chamber music groups are also eligible). The Career Grants are a part of the Avery Fisher Artist Program, along with the Avery Fisher Prize and Special Awards. They are administered by the Lincoln Center for the Performing Arts.

The Grants, which are currently $25,000, are designed to give professional assistance to young musicians who are deemed to have the potential for a solo career. Only U.S. citizens or permanent residents are eligible.

Past recipients of the Avery Fisher Career Grant include Charlie Albright, Joshua Bell, Paul Huang, Michael Brown, Demarre McGill, Anthony McGill, Eduardus Halim, Edgar Meyer, Sarah Chang, Hilary Hahn, Nadja Salerno-Sonnenberg, Ani Kavafian, Ignat Solzhenitsyn, Richard Stoltzman, Conrad Tao, Peter Wiley, Dmitri Sitkovetsky, Igor Begelman, Heidi Lehwalder, Jose Franch-Ballester, George Li, Yuja Wang, Rachell Ellen Wong and Jay Campbell.
