= Begelman =

Begelman is a surname. Notable people with the surname include:

- David Begelman (1921–1995), American film producer, film executive, and talent agent
- Igor Begelman, clarinetist
