= Brackett House =

Brackett House may refer to:

in the United States (by state then city)

- Lyman M. Brackett House, Rochester, Indiana, listed on the National Register of Historic Places (NRHP) in Fulton County
- Daniel Brackett House, Upton, Kentucky, listed on the NRHP in Hardin County
- Brackett House (Newton, Massachusetts), listed on the NRHP
- Brackett House (Reading, Massachusetts), listed on the NRHP
- S. E. Brackett House, Somerville, Massachusetts, listed on the NRHP
- Edward A. Brackett House, Winchester, Massachusetts, listed on the NRHP
- Brackett House (Dublin, New Hampshire), listed on the NRHP in Cheshire County
- Corliss-Brackett House, Providence, Rhode Island, listed on the NRHP
- E. William Brackett House, Yakima, Washington, listed on the NRHP in Yakima County
