= Brocket =

Brocket may refer to:

- Baron Brocket, British peerage title
- Brocket deer, members of the genus Mazama
- Brocket, Alberta, community on the Peigan reserve in Canada
- Brocket, North Dakota, city in USA
- Edward Brocket, MP
- John Brocket (disambiguation), various people
- Brocket 99, controversial audio tape and a documentary about this tape
- Brocket Hall, palladian country house in Hertfordshire, England

== See also ==
- Brockett
