= Air and Simple Gifts =

Quartet composed by John Williams

- by John Williams (after Joseph Brackett)
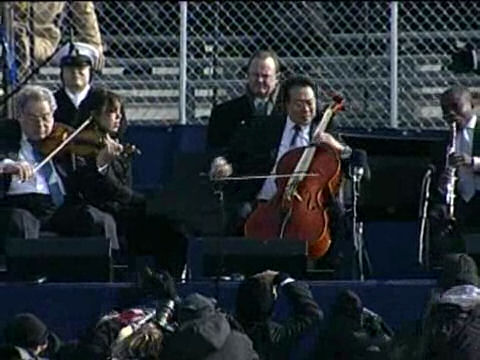
- From left to right: Perlman, Montero, Ma, and McGill at the premiere.
- Genre: Chamber music

Premiere
- Date: January 20, 2009
- Location: First inauguration of Barack Obama
- Performers: Yo-Yo Ma, Itzhak Perlman, Gabriela Montero, and Anthony McGill

Air and Simple Gifts is a quartet composed and arranged by American composer John Williams for the January 20, 2009, inauguration of Barack Obama as the 44th President of the United States. The first public performance of the piece was in Washington, D.C., immediately prior to Obama taking the oath of office, when musicians Anthony McGill (clarinet), Itzhak Perlman (violin), Yo-Yo Ma (cello) and Gabriela Montero (piano) synced their performance to a tape they had recorded two days earlier. It was the first classical quartet to be performed at a presidential inauguration. Obama officially became the 44th President of the United States while the piece was being performed, at noon, as the United States Constitution stipulates.

Although it appeared that the piece was being performed live, it was in fact mimed while a recording made two days before was fed to the television pool and speakers. Yo-Yo Ma told NPR's All Things Considered that the piano keys had been decoupled from the hammers, and the bows of the stringed instruments had been soaped to silence them. The performers stated that the cold 28 °F (−2 °C) weather could have affected the tuning and durability of the instruments, making a live performance too risky.

Williams based the piece on the familiar 19th century Shaker hymn "Simple Gifts" by Joseph Brackett. The source piece is famous for its appearance in Aaron Copland's ballet Appalachian Spring. Williams chose the selection from Copland, one of Obama's favorite classical composers.

The piece is slightly under 4.5 minutes. It is structured in roughly three parts. The first section presents the "Air" material, consisting of a spare, descending modal melody introduced by violin, pensively explored in duet with cello and piano accompaniment. The entrance of the clarinet, playing the "Simple Gifts" theme, signals the beginning of a small set of variations on that melody. The "Air" melody at first intermingles with the "Gifts" theme, though it is supplanted by increasingly energetic variations. Midway through, the key shifts from A major to D major, in which the piece concludes. A short coda reprising the "Air" material follows the most vigorous of the "Gifts" variations. The piece concludes with an unusual series of cadences, ending with chord progression D-major followed by B-major, G-minor and finally D-major.

Yo-Yo Ma played his Stradivarius cello called the Davidov Stradivarius, and Itzhak Perlman played his Stradivarius violin called the Soil Stradivarius, made in 1712 and 1714 respectively, both during Stradivari's "golden period". Gabriela Montero played a Steinway concert grand piano, model D-274. Anthony McGill played a Buffet clarinet.
