= Demarre McGill =

American flutist (born 1975)

- Born: August 28, 1975 (age 50); Chicago, Illinois
- Genres: Classical
- Instrument: Flute
- Member of: Seattle Symphony
- Formerly of: Dallas Symphony Orchestra; San Diego Symphony
- Website: demarremcgill.com

Demarre McGill is an American classical musician who is principal flutist of the Seattle Symphony. He is also one of the few African-American musicians who hold positions in professional orchestras.

== Early life and education ==
McGill began playing the flute at age seven when his parents exposed him and his brother to music, receiving early instruction at the Merit School of Music in Chicago. He was educated at Curtis Institute of Music, studying under Julius Baker and Jeffrey Khaner. He later continued his studies with Baker at the Juilliard School, receiving a Masters of Music degree.

== Career ==
In May 2012, McGill and his brother, Anthony McGill, performed the world premiere of Joel Puckett's Concerto Duo for Flute and Clarinet with the Chicago Youth Symphony Orchestra, the orchestra where they began their musical careers.

McGill has been a recipient of the Avery Fisher Career Grant, an award given every year to outstanding instrumentalists. His younger brother, Anthony, is the principal clarinet of the New York Philharmonic.
