= Brackett House (Dublin, New Hampshire) =

Historic house in New Hampshire, United States

- U.S. National Register of Historic Places
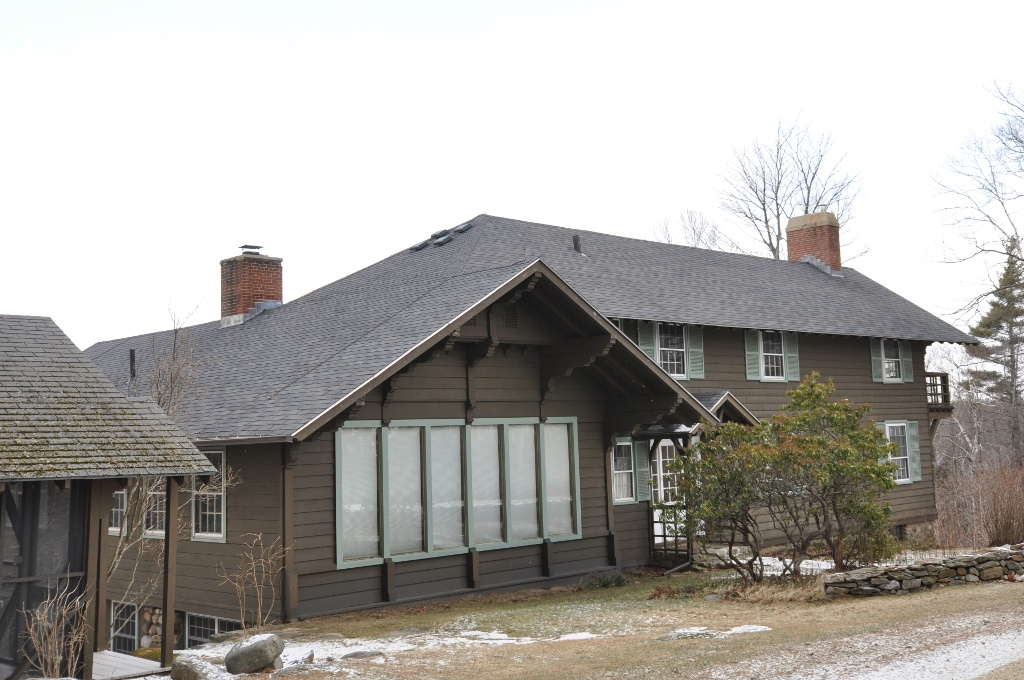

- Location within New Hampshire Location within the United States
- Location: High Ridge Rd., Dublin, New Hampshire
- Coordinates: 42°52′45″N 71°59′45″W
- Area: 0.2 acres (0.081 ha)
- Built: 1915
- Architectural style: Colonial Revival
- MPS: Dublin MRA
- NRHP reference No.: 83004013
- Added to NRHP: December 18, 1983

The Brackett House is an historic house on High Ridge Road, a private road off Valley Road in Dublin, New Hampshire. Erected in 1915 for a prominent academic sociologist and his philanthropist wife, it is an architecturally eclectic Colonial Revival summer house. It was listed on the National Register of Historic Places in 1983.

== Description and history ==
The Brackett House is located in a rural area of eastern Dublin, occupying a spot at the top of a north–south ridge that affords fine views of Mount Monadnock to the west and the hills of Peterborough to the east. It is located on the west side of High Ridge Road, a private lane providing access to the ridge. It is a wood-frame structure, presenting 1½ stories to the road, and 2½ to the west because of the steeply sloping terrain. Its form is that of an L-shaped Colonial Revival house, but it is covered by a roof that is hipped on the main block and gabled on the ell, that extends further than normal for the form. The eaves are supported by large decoratively cut brackets, giving the building the flavor of an alpine chateau. A side porch has balustrades with a square pattern suggestive of Japanese design influence.

The architecturally eclectic house was built in 1915 as the summer residence of Jeffrey Richardson Brackett and Susan K. Brackett. Jeffrey Brackett was a sociologist who taught at Johns Hopkins University and at Simmons College. Susan Brackett left the nearby MacDowell Colony a major endowment in 1931. The family also owned the Ivory Perry Homestead, located in the valley to the west, and occupied both properties until about 1959.

== See also ==
- National Register of Historic Places listings in Cheshire County, New Hampshire
