= John Perry Homestead =

Historic house in New Hampshire, United States

- U.S. National Register of Historic Places
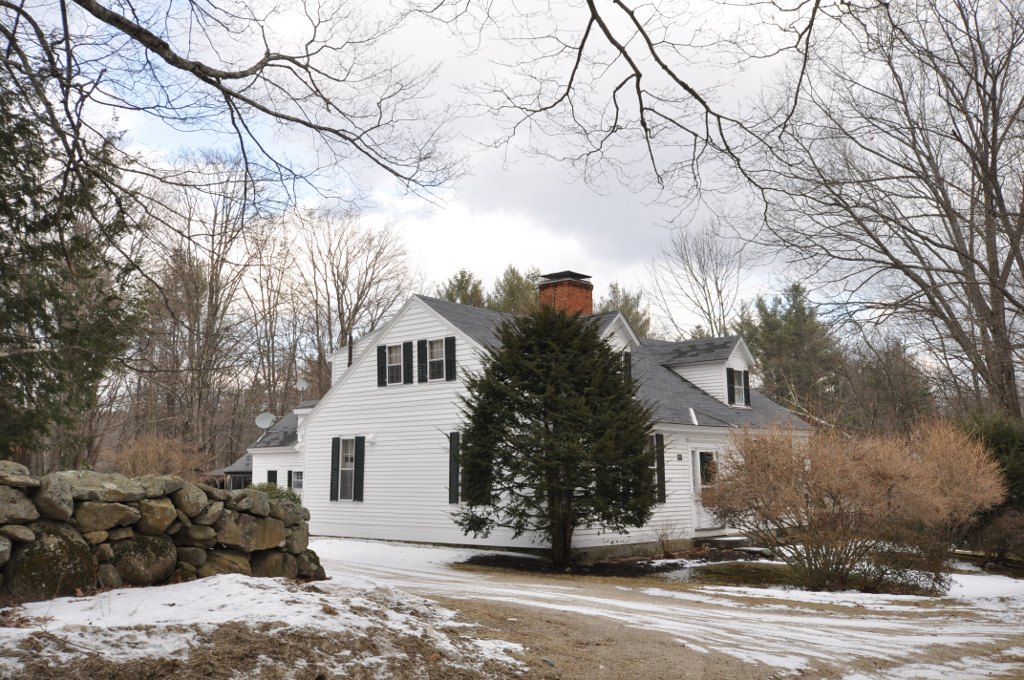

- Location within New Hampshire Location within the United States
- Location: 135 Dooe Rd., Dublin, New Hampshire
- Coordinates: 42°52′45″N 72°0′18″W
- Area: 3 acres (1.2 ha)
- Built: 1795
- Architect: Perry, John
- Architectural style: Cape Colonial
- MPS: Dublin MRA
- NRHP reference No.: 83004063
- Added to NRHP: December 18, 1983

The John Perry Homestead is a historic house at 135 Dooe Road in Dublin, New Hampshire. The 1 1/2-story Cape style farmhouse was built c. 1795 by John Perry, son of Ivory Perry who lived nearby. The house has been only minimally altered since its construction, with the replacement of windows and the addition of gable dormers being the most significant. The house was listed on the National Register of Historic Places in 1983.

== Description and history ==
The John Perry Homestead is located in a rural setting of eastern Dublin, on the north side of Dooe Road a short way west of its junction with Valley Road. It is a 1 1/2-story Cape style wood-frame structure, with a gabled roof, central chimney, and clapboarded exterior. Its main facade is five bays wide, with windows arranged symmetrically around the main entrance. A single-story ell, probably of early 19th-century construction, extends to the rear. The interior retains numerous original period features, include wall paneling and fireplaces.

The house was built about 1795 by John Perry, the oldest son of Ivory Perry, one of Dublin's first proprietors. Unlike his father's homestead, which has undergone some significant alterations, this house has been relatively little altered, with changes in the type of fenestration and the addition of gable dormers being the most significant. Members of the Perry family lived here for over a century; a 20th-century occupant was Jane Dooe, from whose family the name of the road is taken.

== See also ==
- National Register of Historic Places listings in Cheshire County, New Hampshire
