= USS Brackett =

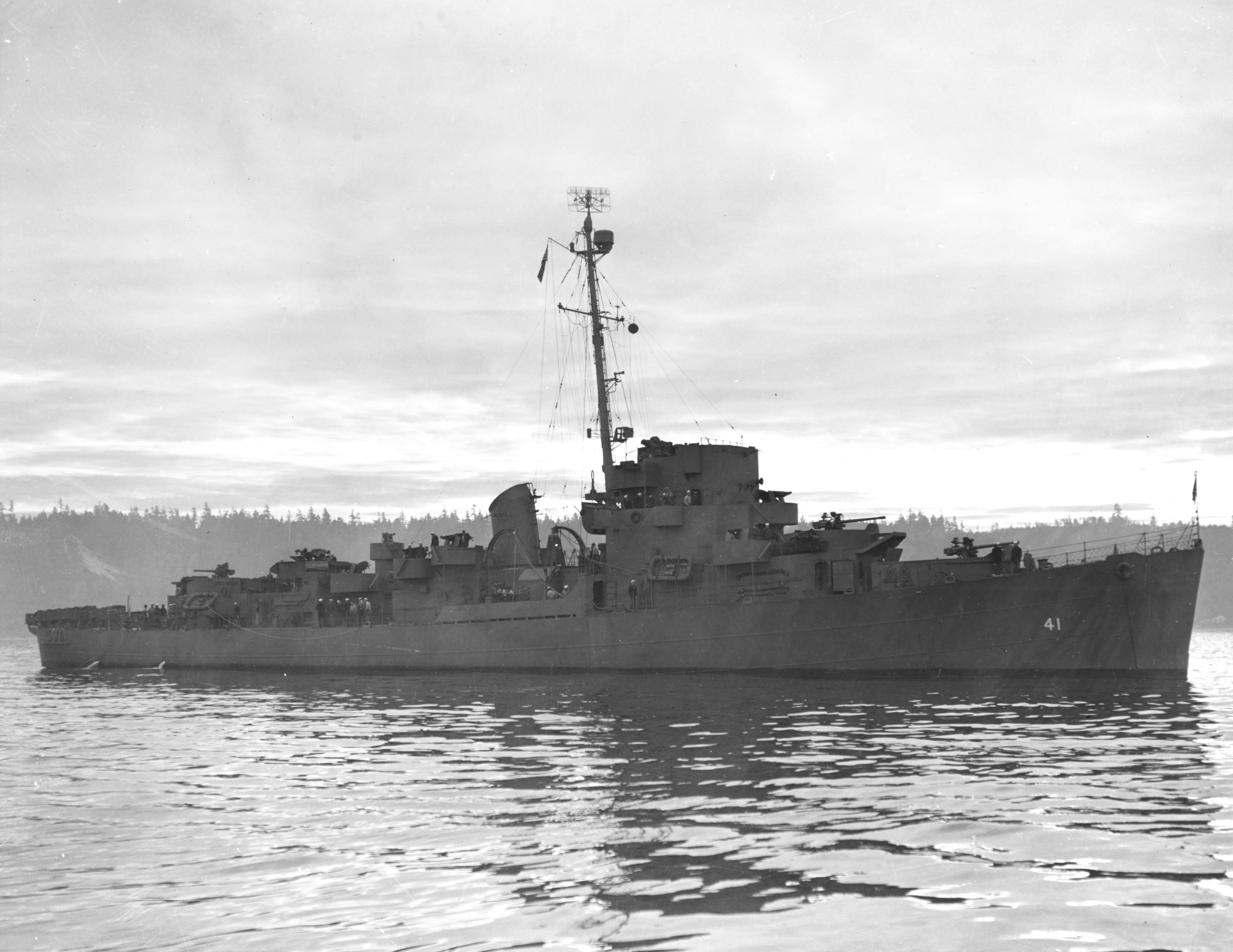
- Brackett on 1 November 1943

History

United States
- Name: USS Brackett
- Builder: Puget Sound Navy Yard
- Laid down: 12 January 1943, as BDE-41 for the United Kingdom
- Launched: 1 August 1943
- Commissioned: 18 October 1943
- Decommissioned: 23 November 1945
- Renamed: Brackett, 16 June 1943
- Stricken: 5 December 1945
- Honors and awards: 3 battle stars (World War II)
- Fate: Sold for scrapping, 22 May 1947

General characteristics
- Type: Evarts-class destroyer escort
- Displacement: 1,140 long tons (1,158 t) standard; 1,430 long tons (1,453 t) full
- Length: 289 ft 5 in (88.21 m) o/a; 283 ft 6 in (86.41 m) w/l
- Beam: 35 ft 2 in (10.72 m)
- Draft: 11 ft (3.4 m) (max)
- Propulsion: 4 × General Motors Model 16-278A diesel engines with electric drive, 6,000 shp (4,474 kW); 2 screws
- Speed: 19 knots (35 km/h; 22 mph)
- Range: 4,150 nmi (7,690 km)
- Complement: 15 officers and 183 enlisted
- Armament: 3 × single 3"/50 Mk.22 dual purpose guns; 1 × quad 1.1"/75 Mk.2 AA gun; 9 × 20 mm Mk.4 AA guns; 1 × Hedgehog Projector Mk.10 (144 rounds); 8 × Mk.6 depth charge projectors; 2 × Mk.9 depth charge tracks

USS Brackett (DE-41) was an Evarts-class destroyer escort of the United States Navy during World War II. She was sent off into the Pacific Ocean to protect convoys and other ships from Japanese submarines and fighter aircraft. She performed escort and anti-submarine operations in dangerous battle areas and was awarded three battle stars.

== Design ==
The Evarts-class destroyer escorts were 289 ft 5 in (88.21 m) long overall, and they had a beam of 35 ft 2 in (10.72 m). They had an average draft of 10 ft 1 in (3.07 m) at their full load displacement of 1,416 long tons (1,439 t). Each ship had a normal crew numbered 156 officers and sailors.

Brackett was propelled by a pair of diesel motors manufactured by General Motors, which drove a pair of screw propellers. Her propulsion system was rated to produce 6,000 brake horsepower (4,500 kW) for a top speed of 19.5 knots (36.1 km/h; 22.4 mph). Oil storage amounted to between 131 and 197 long tons (133 and 200 t), which allowed a cruising radius of up to 6,000 nautical miles (11,000 km; 6,900 mi) at an economical pace of 10 knots (19 km/h; 12 mph).

The ship's armament consisted of a main battery of three 3-inch (76 mm) /50-caliber guns in individual pivot mounts, which could be used against air or surface targets. These were supported by a light anti-aircraft battery that initially consisted of four 1.1 in (28 mm) /75-caliber guns in a quadruple mount and nine 20 mm (0.79 in) Oerlikon guns. For attacks against submarines, the ship was equipped with a Hedgehog mortar, eight depth charge throwers, and two depth charge racks.

== Service history ==
She was laid down as BDE-41 on 12 January 1943 at Bremerton, Washington, by the Puget Sound Navy Yard; redesignated DE-41 on 16 June 1943; launched on 1 August 1943; sponsored by Mrs. George G. Brackett, the mother of Lt. Brackett; and commissioned on 18 October 1943. The destroyer escort reported to the Operational Training Command in San Diego, California, on 12 November for shakedown training. Post-shakedown repairs were completed on 15 December, and Brackett took on provisions before departing San Francisco on 21 December. Eight days later, she moored at Pearl Harbor and immediately commenced training for her part in the invasion of the Marshall Islands.

Brackett stood out of Pearl Harbor on 20 January 1944 and anchored in Funafuti Atoll, Ellice Islands, on the 25th. The destroyer escort got underway again on 29 January with 5th Fleet warships heading for Majuro Atoll in the Marshall Islands. The Japanese had abandoned Majuro in November 1942, and Allied troops, who prepared for an assault on enemy territory, simply raised the Stars and Stripes on 31 January. The atoll's value as an advanced base was apparent, and work to improve existing facilities began immediately. Thanks to the efforts of the United States Coast and Geodetic Survey, a large-scale anchorage chart was available on 2 February; and, two days later, Brackett escorted several of the 5th Fleet ships into safe harbor.

Brackett continued escort duty for supply ships travelling between the Marshall and Gilbert Islands until 9 May when she set course for Pearl Harbor. There, she underwent repairs to her starboard shaft. When she got underway again on 19 June, the destroyer escort set course for the Mariana Islands, arriving at Saipan during the struggle to wrest that island from Japan. She resumed convoy escort duty, protecting ships that constituted the vital pipeline conveying fuel, ammunition, and food to the advanced bases. On 28 July, while en route to Saipan from Eniwetok, Brackett pursued an underwater sound contact, dropping a series of depth charges. No visible evidence of a sinking could be found, and Japanese records opened after the war indicated no submarine lost that could have been Brackett's target.

Late in 1944, the destroyer escort added Manus in the Admiralty Islands to her regular patrol and escort circuit, stopping there for the first time in October and returning again in November. Brackett saw no action other than sinking an occasional floating mine. On 4 December, the escort arrived off the Marshall Islands to assume lifeguard duties during air strikes on the islands bypassed earlier: Wotje, Jaluit, Milli, and Maloelap. Brackett fired on an enemy gun emplacement on Taroa Island on 5 January 1945, destroying one battery before retiring. The destroyer escort was relieved of patrol duty and set course for Pearl Harbor on 7 February. After a four-week availability and rest period, Brackett got underway on 8 March for Ulithi, where preparations for the invasion of Okinawa were underway. Ulithi was an advanced link in the supply chain reaching to the forward combat areas. Brackett provided convoy protection for the 40 fleet tankers shuttling fuel to the Ryukyus, the "reefer" ships carrying fresh and frozen provisions, and the ammunition ships replenishing the 5th and 3rd Fleets during the Okinawa campaign.

In May, Brackett departed Ulithi bound for Guam and then received orders stateside. Underway on 27 June, the destroyer escort arrived in San Francisco, California, on 14 July for an overhaul at the Mare Island Navy Yard. Japan surrendered before the yard work was completed, and Brackett received orders to begin removing salvageable material in preparation for sale. Brackett was decommissioned on 23 November 1945 at Mare Island, and her name was struck from the Navy List on 5 December 1945. She was sold to National Metal and Steel Corp. at Terminal Island, California, in May 1947 and was scrapped.

== Awards ==
- American Campaign Medal
- Asiatic-Pacific Campaign Medal (with three Battle Stars)
- World War II Victory Medal
