= Brackett (crater) =

Crater on the Moon

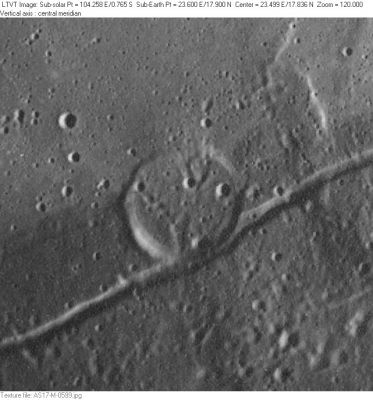
- Apollo 17 image
- Coordinates: 17.84°N 23.54°E
- Diameter: 8.87 km (5.51 mi)
- Depth: Unknown
- Colongitude: 337° at sunrise
- Eponym: Frederick S. Brackett

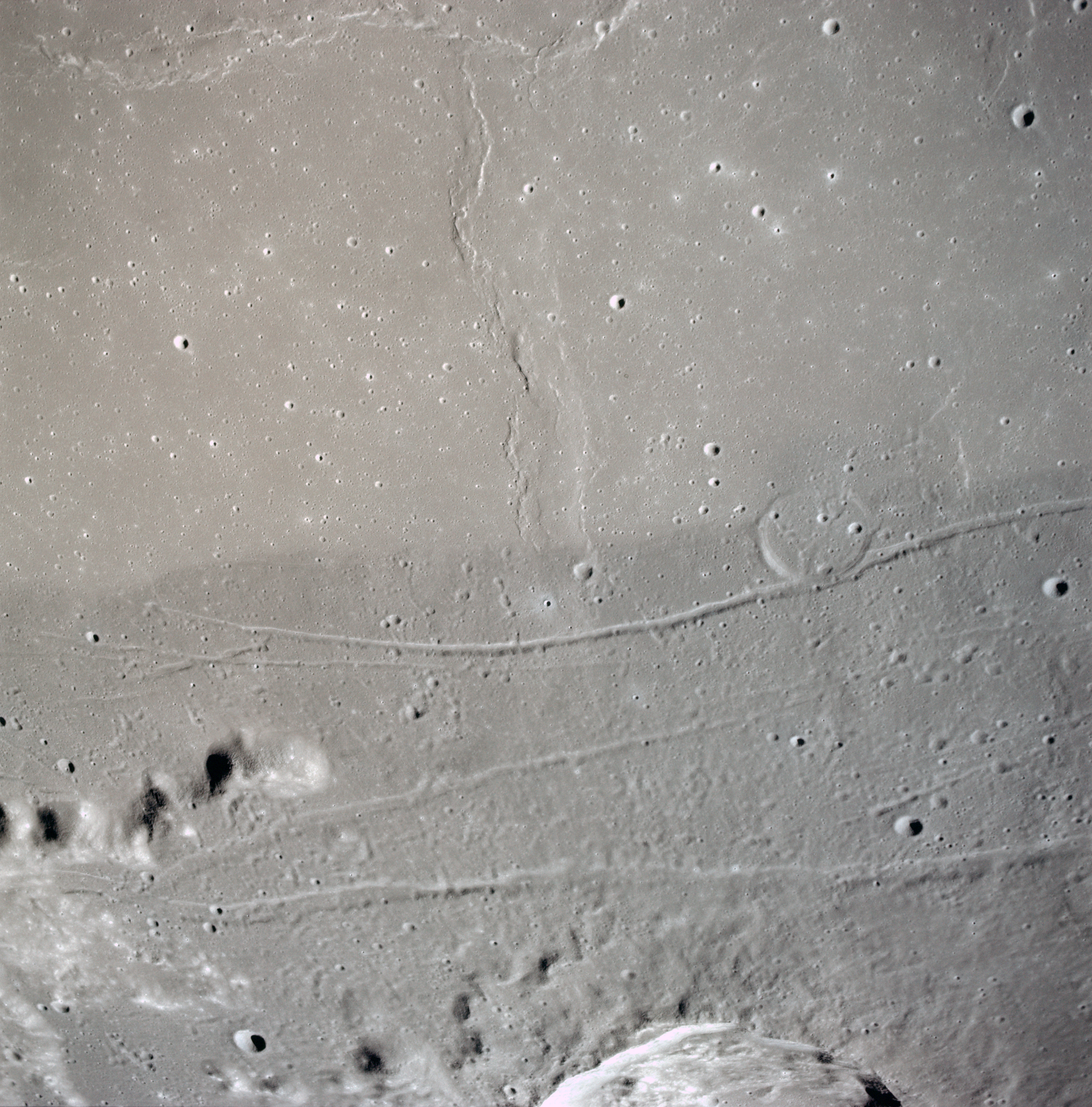
Color image of southern Mare Serenitatis with Brackett right of center

Brackett is a small lunar impact crater that lies near the southeast edge of Mare Serenitatis. The crater has been covered by lava flow, leaving only a ring-shaped trace in the surrounding lunar mare. This crater is best observed under oblique illumination, as it is otherwise difficult to find. The southern rim is contacting a rille system named Rimae Plinius.

The crater is named after American physicist Frederick Sumner Brackett (1896-1988). Its designation was officially adopted by the International Astronomical Union in 1973.
