= E. William Brackett House =

- U.S. National Register of Historic Places
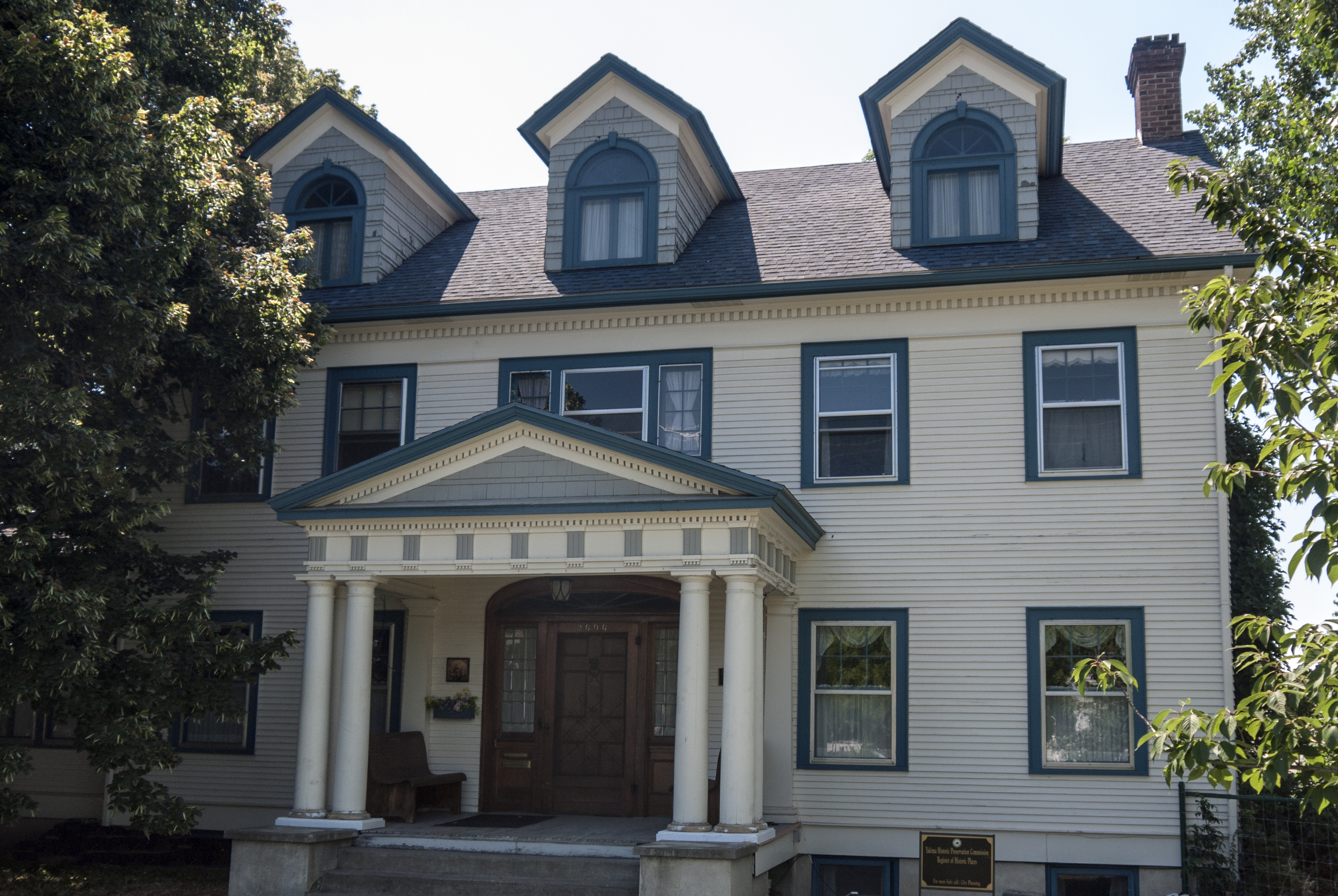
- Front of the home

- Location within Yakima County Location within the United States
- Location: 2606 Tieton Dr., Yakima, Washington
- Coordinates: 46°35′34″N 120°32′35″W
- Area: less than one acre
- Built: 1917
- Architect: W.H.H. Weatherwax
- Architectural style: Colonial Revival
- NRHP reference No.: 90001605
- Added to NRHP: October 25, 1990

The E. William Brackett House, located in Yakima, Washington, was listed in the National Register of Historic Places in 1990. Originally located on 80 acres (32 ha) of orchards and farmland, the building is currently on a three-quarter acre lot, the remainder of the property having been subdivided mostly for single family homes. The interior is composed of 6,000 sq ft (560 m^{2}) of living space symmetrically arranged around a central entry hall.

== Historical background ==
The home was built in 1917 for E. William Brackett, a prominent local citizen who was a pioneer of irrigation in the Yakima valley. Born in Sharon, Massachusetts, in 1869, he travelled to Washington State with his widowed father in 1890. He served as the founding President of the Natchez-Cowyche Ditch Company (precursor to today's Naches-Cowiche Canal Company) for three years from 1894 until 1897. He travelled to Egypt in the 1920s and returned with drawings of that nation's irrigation system that he shared with the Tieton-Naches project. Brackett was also involved in the civic development of Yakima, founding the Nob Hill Grange and eventually donating 18 acres (7.3 ha) to the City of Yakima for the creation of Franklin Park. Brackett remained in the home until his death in 1950; his wife lived there until her death in 1972.

== Architect ==
W.H.H. Weatherwax was a prominent local architect best known for the design of the Yakima Armory. He listed the Brackett house as among his most important residential works.

== Gallery ==
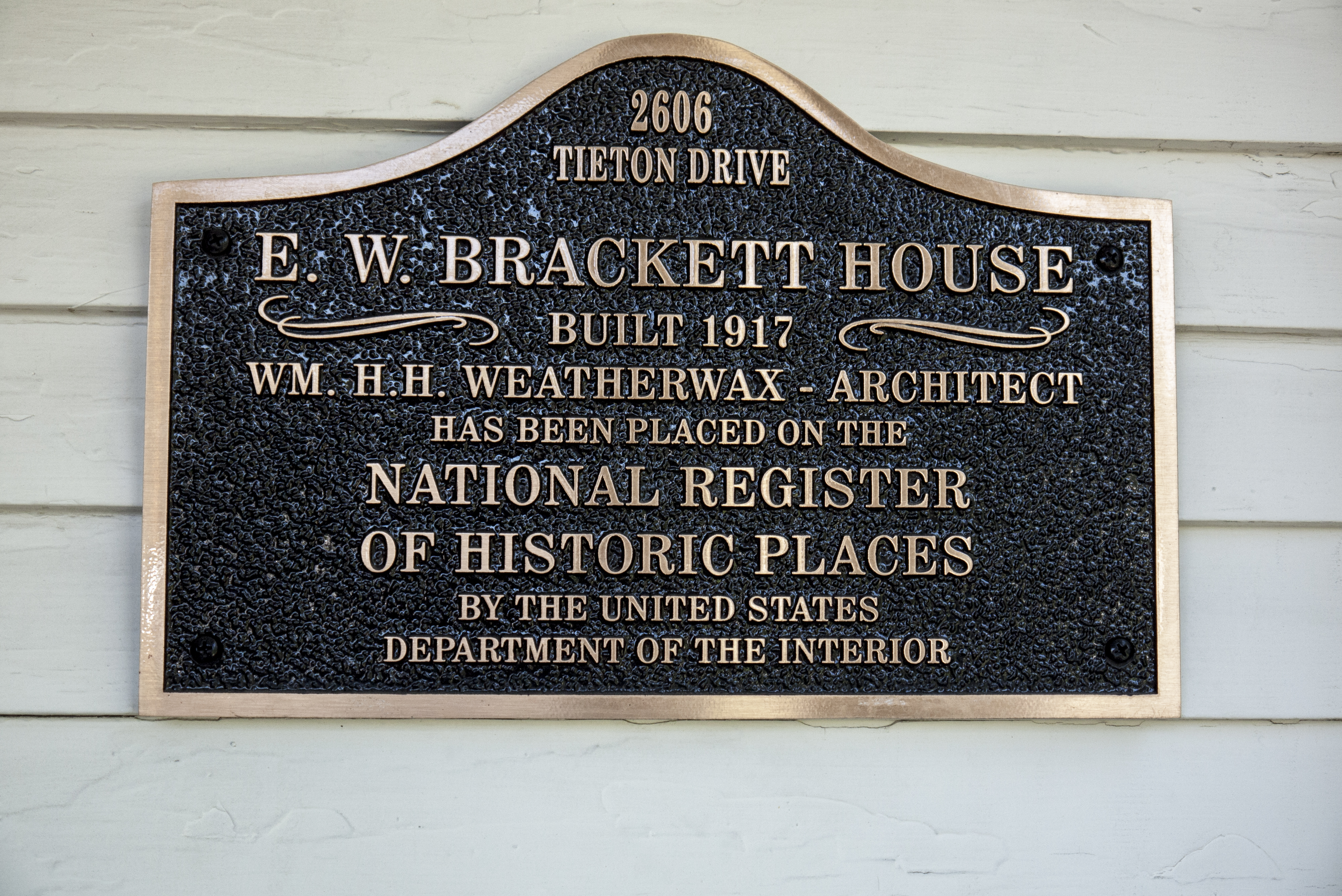

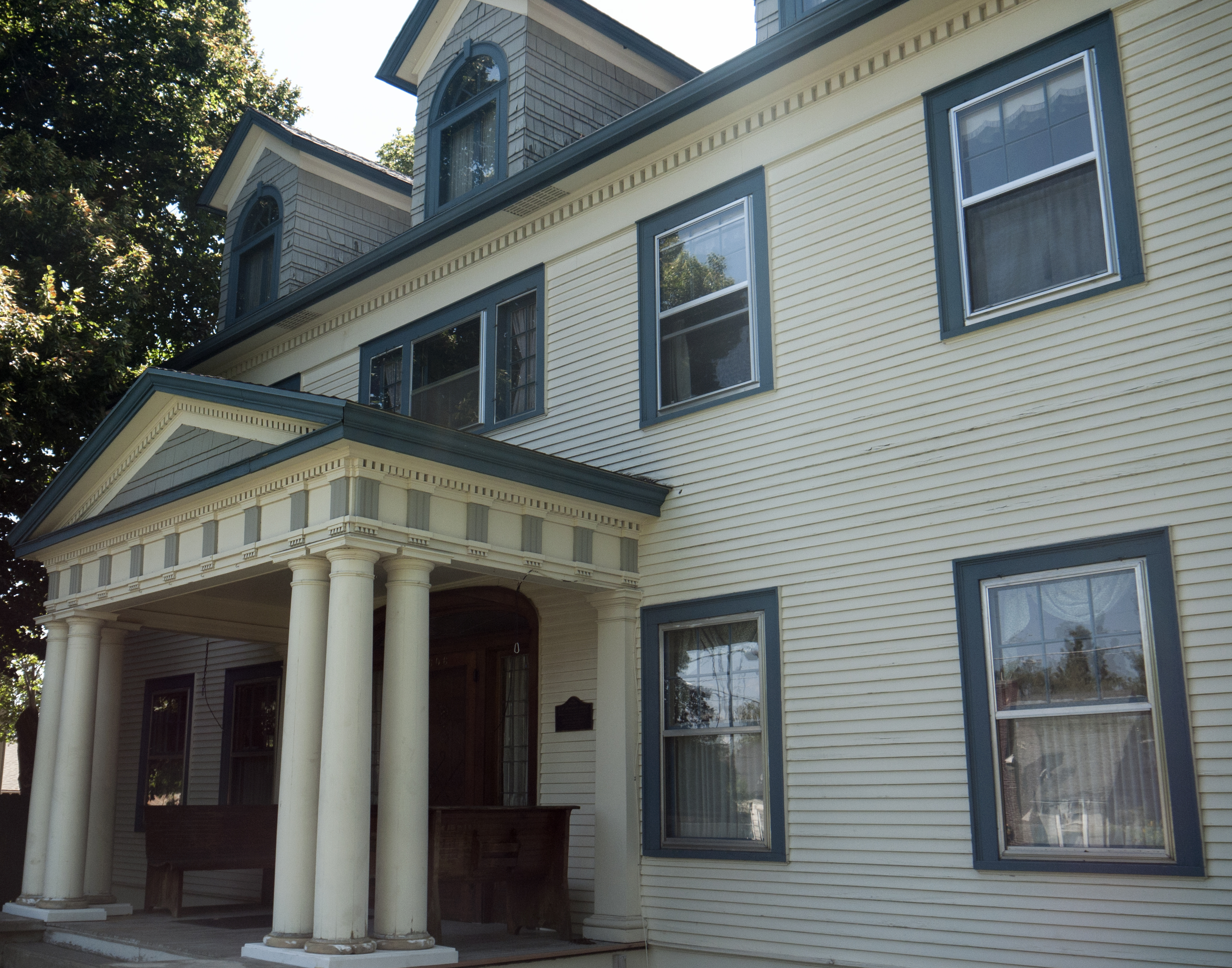
