= Joseph Brackett =

American songwriter and author (1797–1882)

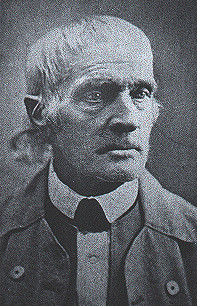

Background information
- Born: Elisha Brackett; May 6, 1797; Cumberland, Maine
- Died: July 4, 1882 (aged 85) New Gloucester, Maine

Joseph Brackett Jr. (May 6, 1797 – July 4, 1882) was an American songwriter, author, and elder of The United Society of Believers in Christ's Second Appearing, better known as the Shakers. The most famous song attributed to Brackett, "Simple Gifts", is still widely performed and adapted.

== Biography ==
Brackett was born in Cumberland, Maine on May 6, 1797, as Elisha Brackett. When he was 10, his first name was changed to Joseph, like his father's, as the Bracketts joined the short-lived Shaker community in Gorham, Maine. This new Shaker community was centered on the Bracketts' property, until the whole group moved to Poland Hill, Maine, in 1819. Brackett's father died there on July 27, 1838, but Brackett continued to rise in the Shaker community, eventually becoming the head of the society in Maine.

Brackett died in the Shaker community of Sabbathday Lake at New Gloucester, Maine, on July 4, 1882.

== Legacy ==
Brackett is known today primarily as the presumed author of the Shaker dancing song "Simple Gifts", which has become an internationally loved tune, both through his original version and many of its adaptations. There are two conflicting narratives of Shaker origin as to the composer of the song. One account attributes the song to a "Negro spirit" heard at Canterbury, New Hampshire, which would make the song a "gift song" received by a Shaker from the spirit world. Alternatively, and far more widely accepted, the song's composer is said to be Brackett. The song, written in 1848, was largely unknown outside of Shaker communities until Aaron Copland used the melody in his 1944 composition Appalachian Spring. The tune is also known widely through the lyrics "Lord of the Dance", written by Sydney Carter in 1963. The "Tune Lovers Society", an online organization designed to preserve and protect American tunes from the past, sponsors a birthday commemoration for Brackett on May 6.
