= Lord of the Dance (hymn) =

English religious song

"Lord of the Dance," is a hymn written by English songwriter Sydney Carter in 1963. The melody is from the American Shaker song "Simple Gifts" composed in 1848. It is also known as "I Danced in the Morning" for the opening words of the first verse. The hymn is widely performed in English-speaking congregations and assemblies.

The song follows the idea of the traditional English carol "Tomorrow Shall Be My Dancing Day", which tells the gospel story in the first-person voice of Jesus with the device of portraying his life as a dance.

== Author's perspective ==
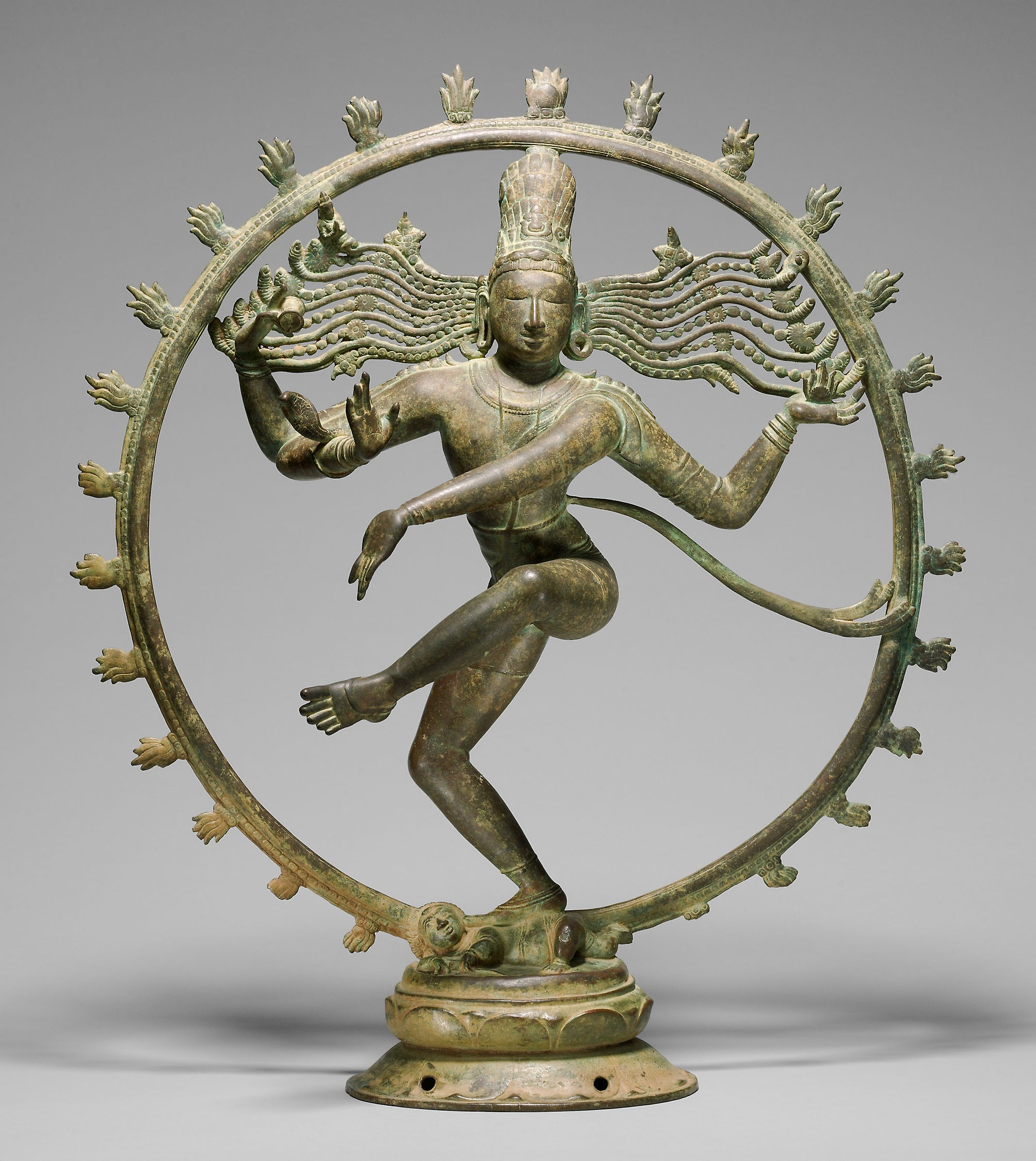
A statue of Nataraja (pictured), a form of the Hindu god Shiva, partially inspired the song.

In writing the lyrics to "Lord of the Dance", Carter was inspired partly by Jesus, but also by a statue of the Hindu deity Shiva as Nataraja (Shiva's dancing pose) which sat on his desk. He later stated, "I did not think the churches would like it at all. I thought many people would find it pretty far flown, probably heretical and anyway dubiously Christian. But in fact people did sing it and, unknown to me, it touched a chord."

Carter wrote:

I see Christ as the incarnation of the piper who is calling us. He dances that shape and pattern which is at the heart of our reality. By Christ I mean not only Jesus; in other times and places, other planets, there may be other Lords of the Dance. But Jesus is the one I know of first and best. I sing of the dancing pattern in the life and words of Jesus.

Whether Jesus ever leaped in Galilee to the rhythm of a pipe or drum I do not know. We are told that David danced (and as an act of worship too), so it is not impossible. The fact that many Christians have regarded dancing as a bit ungodly (in a church, at any rate) does not mean that Jesus did.

The Shakers didn't. This sect flourished in the United States in the nineteenth century, but the first Shakers came from Manchester in England, where they were sometimes called the "Shaking Quakers". They hived off to America in 1774, under the leadership of Mother Anne. They established celibate communities – men at one end, women at the other; though they met for work and worship. Dancing, for them, was a spiritual activity. They also made furniture of a functional, lyrical simplicity. Even the cloaks and bonnets that the women wore were distinctly stylish, in a sober and forbidding way.

Their hymns were odd, but sometimes of great beauty: from one of these ("Simple Gifts") I adapted this melody. I could have written another for the words of 'Lord of the Dance' (some people have), but this was so appropriate that it seemed a waste of time to do so. Also, I wanted to salute the Shakers.

Sometimes, for a change I sing the whole song in the present tense. "I dance in the morning when the world is begun...". It's worth a try.

— Sydney Carter, Green Print for Dance

== Criticism ==
Verse 3 of the hymn, which includes the lines that "I danced on the Sabbath and I cured the lame // [t]he Holy People said it was a shame // they ripped me, stripped me, hung me high // Left me there on the cross to die", has been analysed as implying collective Jewish responsibility for the death of Jesus, although other interpreters do not identify the "Holy people" directly with Jews.

== Notable recordings ==
- Martin Carthy and Dave Swarbrick, on the album But Two Came By (1968)
- The McCalmans, on the album Singers Three (1969)
- The Corries, on the live album The Corries In Concert (1969)
- Donovan, on the album HMS Donovan (1971)
- The Dubliners, on the album Now (1975)
- Champions of Europe, "Stand Free", on the album Gothenburg (1983)
- The Bach Choir, on the album Family Carols (1991)
- Charlie Zahm, on his album The Celtic Balladeer (1999)
- Blackmore's Night, on the album Winter Carols (2007)
- Salisbury Cathedral Choir, on the album Great Hymns from Salisbury (2013)
- New World, on "B" side of the single "Kara Kara" (1971)
- Applachian Spring, Ballet, Choreography by Martha Graham, music composed by Aaron Copland (1944). Example: https://www.youtube.com/watch?v=KfdwgXSdcMw
