= Frederick Sumner Brackett =

American physicist (1896–1988)

- Born: August 1, 1896; Claremont, California
- Died: January 28, 1988 (aged 91)
- Education: Pomona College
- Father: Frank Parkhurst Brackett

Frederick Sumner Brackett (August 1, 1896 – January 28, 1988), was an American physicist and spectroscopist.

Born in Claremont, California, to Frank and Lucretia Brackett, he graduated from Pomona College and worked as an observer at Mount Wilson Observatory until 1920. He observed the infra-red radiation of the Sun. Brackett received a doctorate in physics from the Johns Hopkins University in 1922. Applying a xenon filled discharge tube, he discovered the hydrogen Brackett series, where an electron jumps up from or drops down to the fourth fundamental level, in 1922.

He then taught physics at the University of California, Berkeley.

He moved to the Washington area and joined the Department of Agriculture's Fixed oxygen Lab in 1927. He transferred to the National Institute of Health (NIH) in 1936 as director of biophysics research.

At NIH, he was a scientist in the Division of Industrial Hygiene, where he developed spectrometers to detect toxic substances in body fluids, including one containing two of the largest natural quartz prisms in the world.

During World War II, he directed a research optics program at the Army. He was promoted to the rank of lieutenant colonel and received the Legion of Merit for his work.

Brackett returned to the NIH as chief of the photobiology section. He retired in 1961.

The lunar crater Brackett was named after him in 1974. At the time, he was the only living person to have a Moon crater named for him.
