= Frank Parkhurst Brackett =

American astronomer (1865–1951)

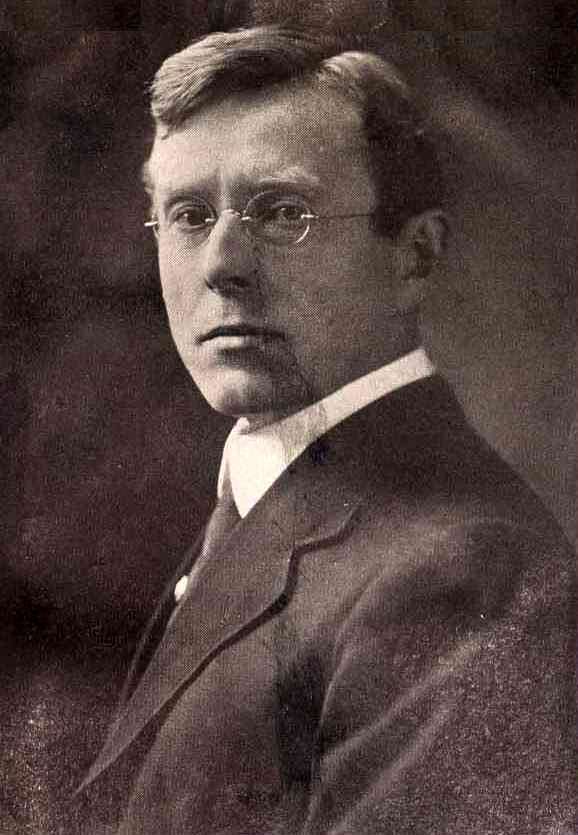
- Born: June 16, 1865; Provincetown, Massachusetts
- Died: September 3, 1951 (aged 86); Los Angeles County, California
- Education: Dartmouth College (M.A.)
- Employer: Pomona College
- Spouse: Lucretia Burdick
- Parents: Solomon Hoyt Brackett (father); Mary A. Thomas (mother)

Frank Parkhurst Brackett (June 16, 1865 – September 3, 1951) was an American professor of astronomy who taught at Pomona College.

== Biography ==
Brackett was born in Provincetown, Massachusetts, the eldest son of Solomon Hoyt Brackett and Mary A. née Thomas. The following year his father taught school at Stoneham, then in 1868 he was named principal of the High School in Keene, New Hampshire. He later became Professor of Natural Sciences at St. Johnsbury Academy in Vermont. Frank matriculated to Dartmouth College, where he paid his way working various jobs, then graduated with a B.S. in 1887 with Phi Beta Kappa honors. The same year he moved to Los Angeles, California and accepted a teaching position at a private school.

In 1888, at the behest of Reverend Charles B. Sumner, he helped found a small Christian school in Pomona that served as the foundation of Pomona College. Bracket initially served as an instructor in mathematics and Latin at the school. He was married to the local watercolor artist Lucretia Burdick on August 15, 1889. The couple had two sons. The eldest, Frederick Sumner Brackett, was born August 1, 1896 and became a biophysicist. The younger son, Frank Parkhurst Brackett Jr., became a chemist and a supervising executive.

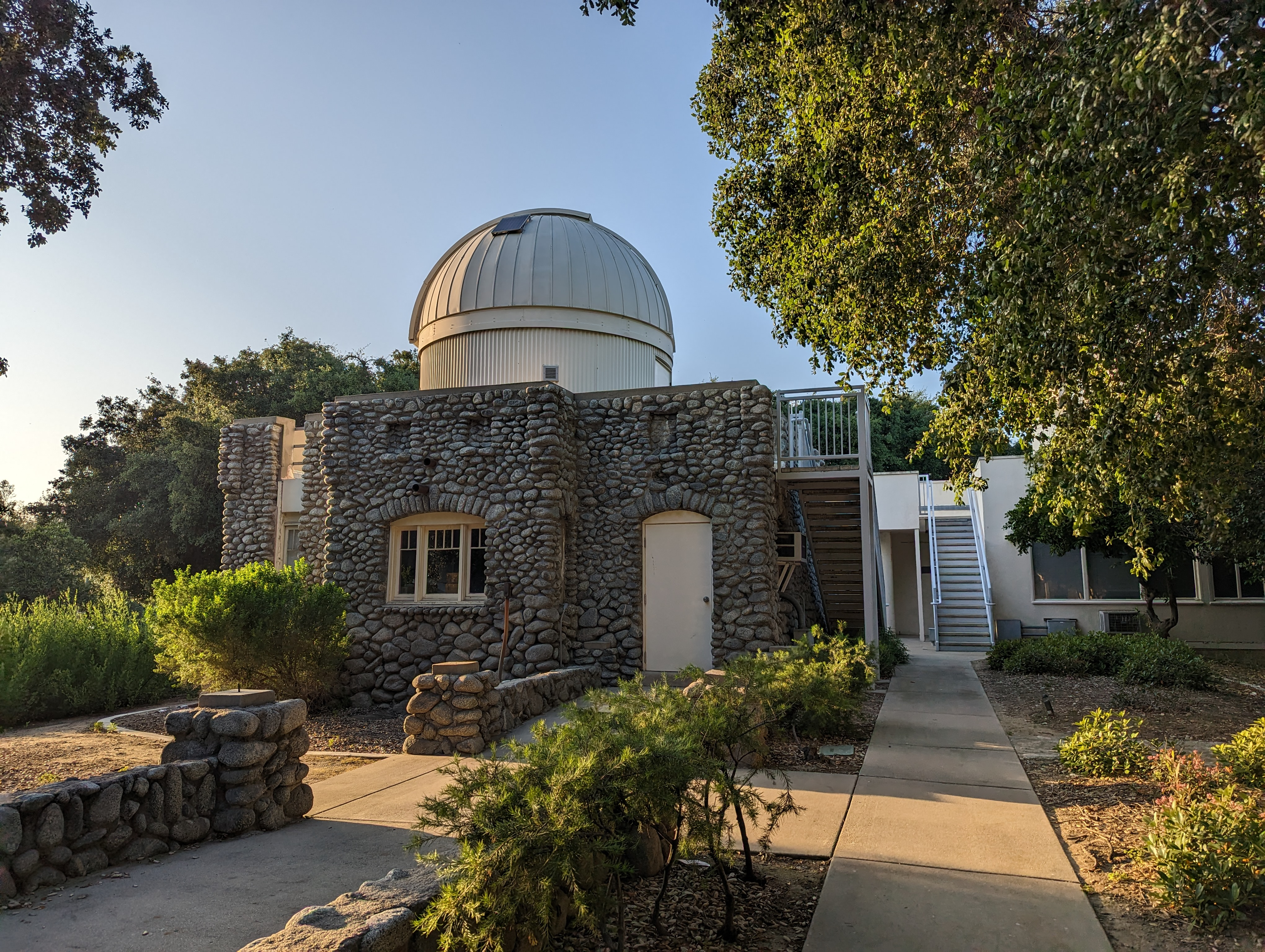
Brackett Observatory

Brackett was awarded a Master of Arts degree from Dartmouth College in 1890. The same year he became professor of astronomy at Pomona. To instruct his students, Brackett relied on a six-inch telescope that was acquired second-hand. A college observatory based on his design was completed in 1908 and Brackett became its director. This structure was funded by a former student, Llewellyn Bixby, from the class of 1901. It was dedicated the Frank P. Brackett Observatory in his honor.

During the November months at Pomona College, Brackett organized several observing campaigns with his students to perform meteor counts of the Leonids. In 1910, Brackett became professor of mathematics at the University of California. The following year he joined Charles G. Abbot on the Smithsonian Expedition to Algeria as part of an ongoing effort to measure the solar constant. Two years later he joined another Smithsonian expedition that ascended Mount Whitney to measure nocturnal radiation from the atmosphere. After World War I began in 1914, he took a leave from his teaching position to participate on the Commission for Relief in Belgium. He was given permission by the German occupation forces to visit the Royal Observatory of Belgium in 1916 and report on its condition. In 1917, he worked on the Selective Service Act in the Los Angeles area.

Brackett penned the History of Pomona Valley, California, which was published in 1920. During the 1920s he joined the R.O.T.C. and was trained at Angel Island. He was awarded an honorary PhD from Dartmouth in 1927 on the occasion of the 40th reunion of his class. The solar eclipse of April 28, 1930 passed over California, and Pomona College organized an expedition to observe the event. He retired from teaching at Pomona in 1933, as professor emeritus of astronomy. His wife Lucretia passed in 1937. In 1944, he published his reminiscences of the college in a work titled Granite and Sagebrush. He was awarded an honorary PhD from Pomona in 1947 on the 60th anniversary of its founding.

Brackett Field in Los Angeles County is named after him.

Brackett at the Fourth Conference International Union for Cooperation in Solar Research at Mount Wilson Observatory, 1910
