= Ward Brackett =

American artist

Ward Brackett (April 2, 1914 – December 14, 2006) was an American artist who created for paperback books and magazines, including the Reader's Digest and Cosmopolitan. He lived in Westport, Connecticut, for 59 years and was a member of the Society of Illustrators, the Silvermine Arts Guild and the Westport Arts Center.

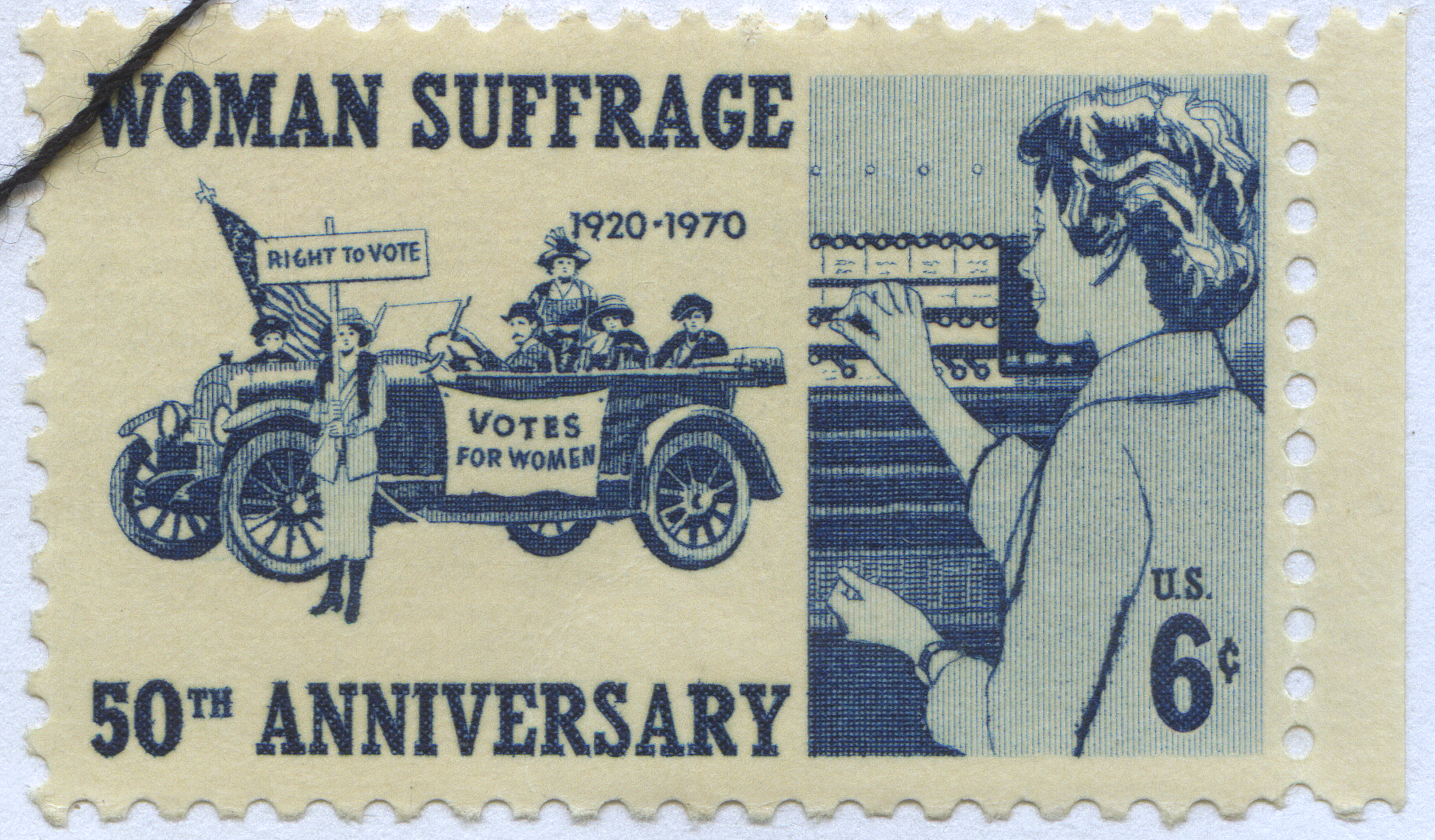
Commemoration of the 1970 anniversary of the 19th Amendment to the U.S. Constitution, by Ward Brackett
