= Brackett Field =

Airport in La Verne, California, United States

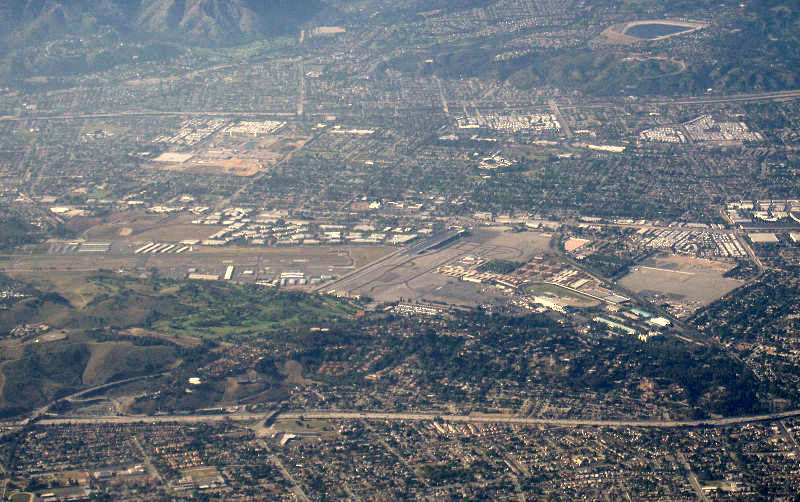
- Brackett Field and Pomona Fairplex
- IATA: POC; ICAO: KPOC; FAA LID: POC

Summary
- Airport type: Public
- Operator: County of Los Angeles
- Location: La Verne, California, U.S.
- Elevation AMSL: 309 m (1,014 ft)
- Coordinates: 34°05′30″N 117°46′54″W
- Interactive map of Brackett Field

Runways
Direction	Length		Surface
Direction	m	ft	Surface
8L/26R	1,116	3,661	Asphalt
8R/26L	1,475	4,840	Asphalt

Brackett Field (IATA: POC, ICAO: KPOC, FAA LID: POC) is a public airport a mile (2 km) southwest of La Verne, in Los Angeles County, California, United States. It was named after astronomer Frank Parkhurst Brackett (1865–1951), one of the original professors at Pomona College.

== History ==
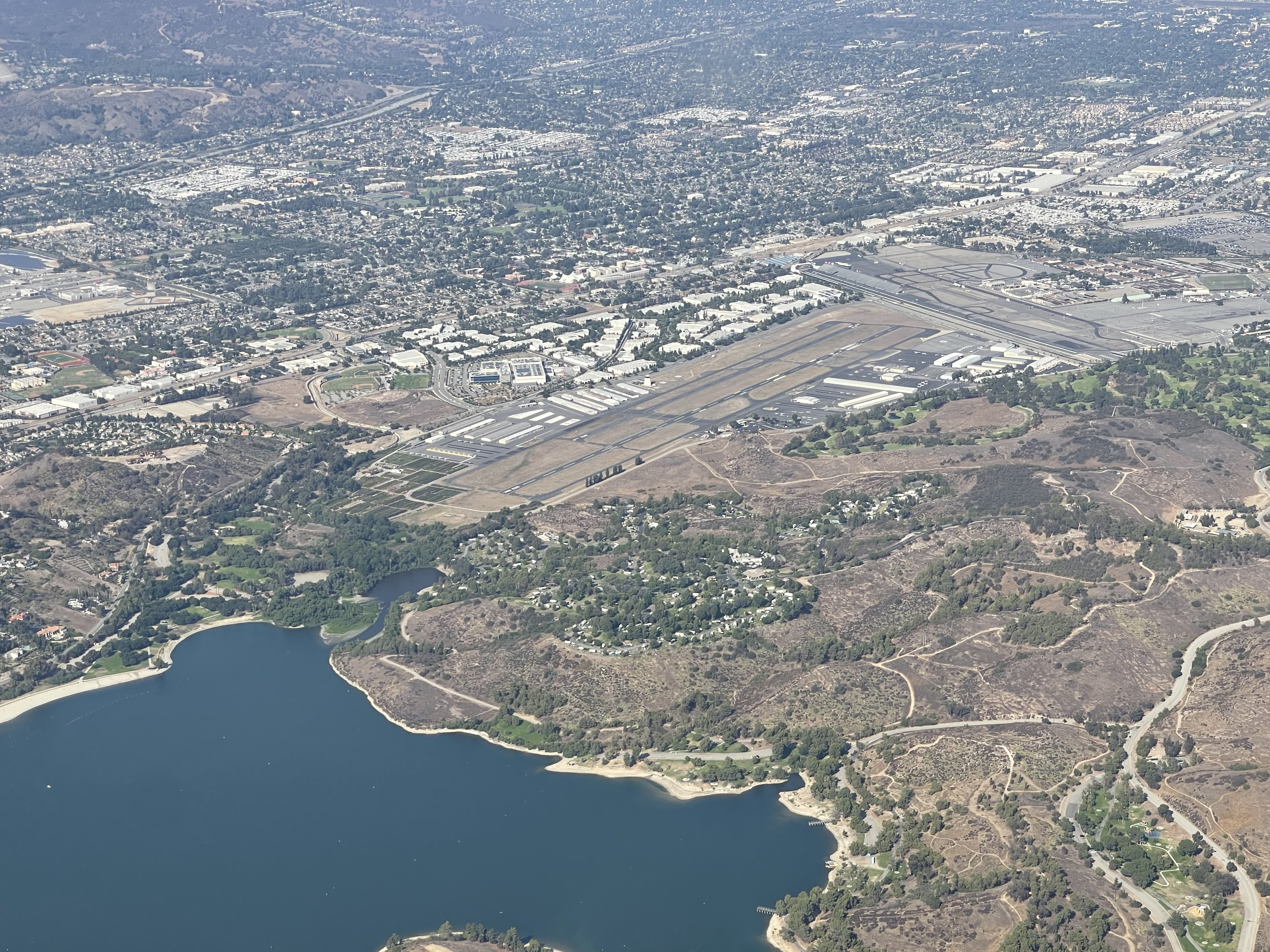
A view of Brackett Field, Puddingstone Reservoir, and the Los Angeles County Fairgrounds; University of La Verne can also be seen.

Brackett Field originally consisted of a dirt strip cut out of a field in the late 1930s. The original runway was 2,600 feet of dirt and there was a school for student pilots from Pomona College. Later, the Civil Air Patrol, then a paramilitary branch of the U.S. Air Force, used Brackett Field for operations during World War II. In 1957 the county took over the airport and has owned it since that time.

Brackett, about an hour east of the studios in Hollywood, California, has been used for location filming of scenes for a number of TV series and movies. These include Wings of Fire, Airport 1975, Spencer's Pilots (CBS, 1974–1975), The Invaders and The Tim Conway Show.

The field was the starting point of the Powder Puff Derby in 1947.

Brackett originally had one runway (26 / 8), which was paved and had paved taxiways on each side. The control tower was built in the late 1960s.

In the 1980s increased traffic (due to the loss of other general aviation airports in the area to urban encroachment) led to the northern taxiway being replaced by a second runway (26R / 8L), which forced the control tower to move a few feet north.

Most of the development of the field prior to the 1980s was on the south side, where the Administration Building ("Ad Building") is located. These developments included a Cessna dealership, flying schools and other facilities such as the first metal hangars on the field.

A large, wooden hangar was built on the north side of the field, to house such operations as a Piper dealership and aircraft repair. The hangar burned down circa 1960, was rebuilt, then burned down again about 10 years later, was again rebuilt, then demolished a few years later to make way for more modern facilities.

Since the 1960s, Brackett has been the home base of Civil Air Patrol (Air Force Auxiliary) Squadron 64.
