= Ivory Perry Homestead =

Historic house in New Hampshire, United States

- U.S. National Register of Historic Places
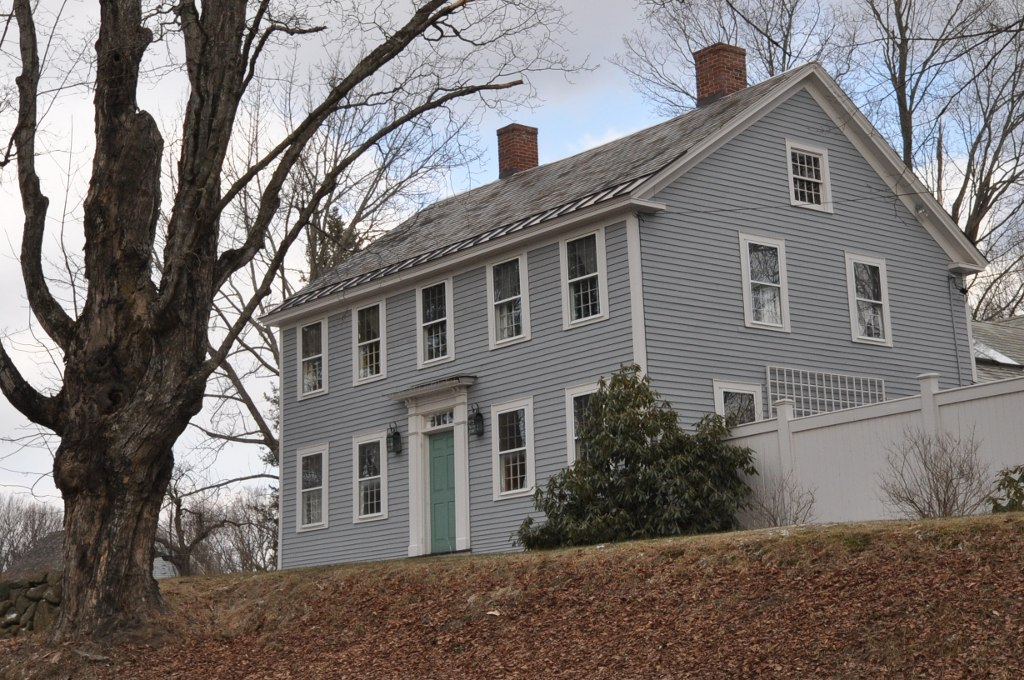

- Location within New Hampshire Location within the United States
- Location: Corner Valley and Dooe Rds., Dublin, New Hampshire
- Coordinates: 42°52′38″N 72°0′1″W
- Area: 1.1 acres (0.45 ha)
- Built: 1767
- Built by: Perry, Ivory
- Architectural style: Early Republic
- MPS: Dublin MRA
- NRHP reference No.: 83004061
- Added to NRHP: December 15, 1983

The Ivory Perry Homestead is a historic house at the corner of Valley and Dooe roads in Dublin, New Hampshire. Built about 1767 and enlarged about 1820, it retains many original features from its period of construction. It was built by Ivory Perry, one of Dublin's first white settlers. The house was listed on the National Register of Historic Places in 1983.

== Description and history ==
The Ivory Perry Homestead stands in a rural setting of eastern Dublin, at the northeast corner of Valley and Dooe roads. It is a 2 1/2-story wood-frame structure, with a gabled slate roof and clapboarded exterior. It has two interior brick chimneys, and a symmetrical five-bay facade. The main entry is flanked by pilasters and topped by a heavy cornice; it is not original to the house, but was recovered from another early 19th-century house that was demolished. The interior's original 18th-century features include a large kitchen fireplace. A single-story ell, of late 18th or early 19th-century construction, extends to the rear.

The oldest portion of this dates to c. 1767, when Ivory Perry, one of Dublin's first proprietors, built a 1 1/2-story Cape-style farmhouse. In c. 1820 his son enlarged the building, adding the second story and adding modest Federal styling. The building's exterior was replaced in the early 1980s in a historically sensitive manner. Ivory Perry is also credited with building a nearby schoolhouse and conducting school in this house for several years. In the early 20th century, this house was bought by Jeffrey Richardson Brackett, a professor at Johns Hopkins University, as a summer residence. A tenant during the 1960s was sculptor Blanche Dombek.

== See also ==
- John Perry Homestead
- National Register of Historic Places listings in Cheshire County, New Hampshire
