= John Brocket =

John Brocket or Brockett may refer to:

- Sir John Brocket (died 1558) (1523–1558), English MP for Hertfordshire, 1553, 1555
- Sir John Brocket (died 1598) (c.1540–1598), son of the above, English MP for Hertfordshire, 1572
- John Brockett (American colonist) (1611–1690), American colonist
- John Trotter Brockett (1788–1842), English antiquary
