= Anthony McGill (musician) =

American clarinetist (born 1979)

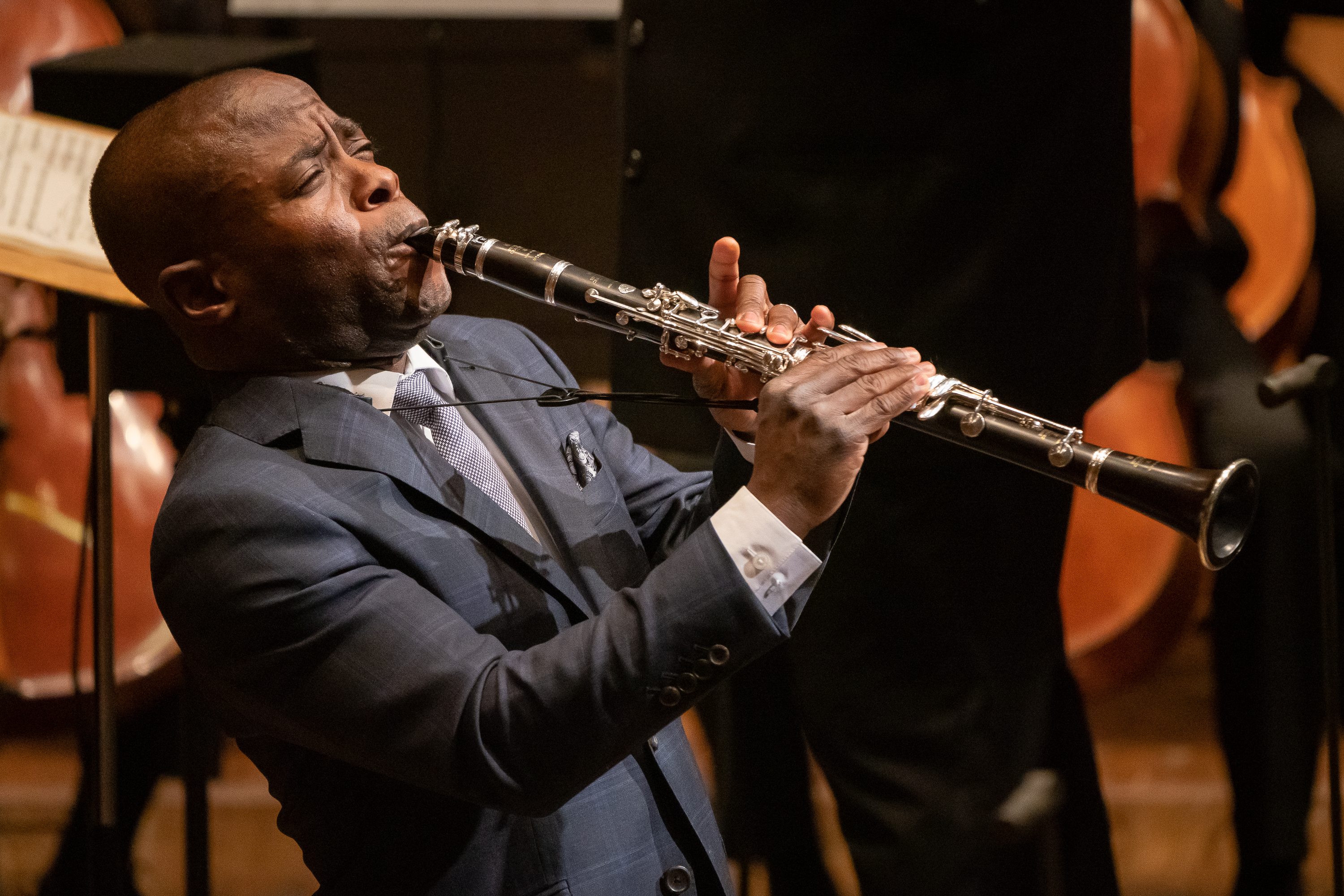
- McGill performing at Lincoln Center in 2019

Background information
- Born: July 17, 1979 (age 47); Chicago, Illinois, U.S.
- Website: anthonymcgill.com

Anthony McGill (born July 17, 1979) is the principal clarinetist for the New York Philharmonic, after having served for a decade as principal clarinet of the Metropolitan Opera Orchestra.

== Biography ==
McGill is originally from Chicago, Illinois, growing up in the city's Chatham neighborhood.

He studied music at the Merit School of Music in Chicago, attended the Interlochen Arts Academy and the Curtis Institute of Music in Philadelphia, and is an instructor at the Peabody Institute at Johns Hopkins University and the Mannes College of Music. McGill is one of the few African American musicians to hold a principal position in a major orchestra.

McGill was a recipient of the 2000 Avery Fisher Career Grant and was the 2020 recipient of the Avery Fisher Prize, awarded to "solo instrumentalists who have demonstrated outstanding achievement and excellence in music".

With Itzhak Perlman, Yo-Yo Ma, and Gabriela Montero, McGill recorded and performed John Williams's "Air and Simple Gifts", composed for the inauguration of President Barack Obama on January 20, 2009. Although the music played was a recording made two days before because of concerns that the cold weather might damage the instruments, the quartet was actually playing at the same time as the recording.

McGill's older brother, Demarre, is the principal flutist of the Seattle Symphony and previously held the same position with the Dallas Symphony Orchestra, the San Diego Symphony. and The Florida Orchestra.
