= Gabriela Montero =

Venezuelan classical pianist (born 1970)

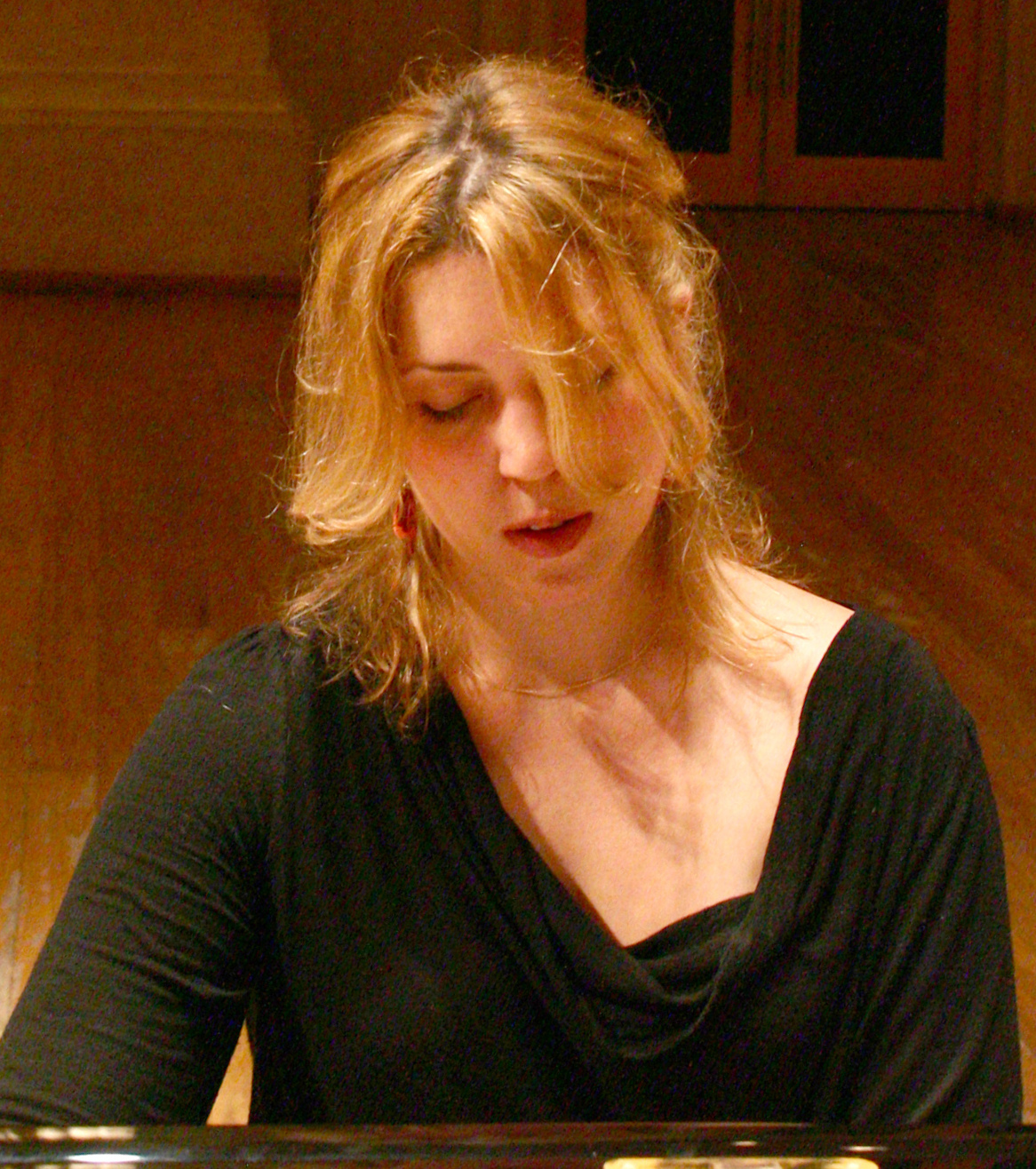
- Montero at Sala São Paulo (2007)

Background information
- Born: May 10, 1970 (age 56); Caracas, Venezuela
- Education: Royal Academy of Music
- Genres: Classical, contemporary classical music
- Occupations: Pianist, composer
- Website: Official website

Gabriela Montero (born May 10, 1970) is a Venezuelan pianist, known both for her improvisations of musical pieces on themes suggested by her audience and other sources, as well as for her performances of a standard classical repertoire.

Having started her artistic career in the El Sistema music education program in Venezuela, Montero later studied at the Royal Academy of Music in the U.K. She has performed in major concert halls in the U.S. and Europe with international orchestras, including the New York Philharmonic, the Los Angeles Philharmonic and the Swedish Radio Symphony Orchestra.

Among other recognition, Montero has been honored with two Grammy Awards and two ECHO Prizes in Germany.

== Biography ==
Born in Caracas, Venezuela, of an American-born mother and a Venezuelan father, Montero was seven months old when her parents introduced her to the piano. She used her right index finger to play individual notes. When she was fifteen months old, her parents noticed she was picking out a familiar tune. Three months later, before she could speak, she had picked out the melody of the national anthem.

Montero began formal piano lessons at age four and gave her first public performance at the age of five. At eight, she made her concerto debut at the National Theatre of Venezuela in Caracas, performing the complete Haydn D Major Piano Concerto with the National Youth Orchestra of Venezuela, conducted by José Antonio Abreu. At the age of nine, she was awarded a government scholarship to study in the U.S.

From 1990 until 1993, she studied at the Royal Academy of Music in London with Hamish Milne. In 1995, she won third prize at the XIII International Chopin Piano Competition.

== Concerts ==
At the end of both solo recitals and after performing a piano concerto, Montero has invited her audience to participate by proposing a melody for improvisation. At times, members of the orchestra have also suggested a theme. "When improvising," Montero says, "I connect to my audience in a completely unique way – and they connect with me. Because improvisation is such a huge part of who I am, it is the most natural and spontaneous way I can express myself. I have been improvising since my hands first touched the keyboard, but for many years I kept this aspect of my playing secret."

Montero has performed with the New York Philharmonic; debuted with Lorin Maazel, Los Angeles Philharmonic at the Hollywood Bowl; Philharmonia Orchestra at the Royal Festival Hall; Rotterdam Philharmonisch Orkest at De Doelen; and NDR Hanover at the Bergen Festival. In recitals, her engagements include the Edinburgh Festival, Vienna Konzerthaus, Klavier-Festival Ruhr, Kölner Philharmonie, Tonhalle Düsseldorf, Konzerthaus Berlin, Alter Sendesaal Frankfurt, Kennedy Center Washington, D.C., and at the Progetto Martha Argerich Festival in Lugano where she has been invited for several years.

At the inauguration of U.S. president Barack Obama on January 20, 2009, Montero performed the composition by John Williams Air and Simple Gifts along with Itzhak Perlman, Yo-Yo Ma, and Anthony McGill. The music heard at the ceremony, however, was a recording made two days before, because the cold weather might have damaged the instruments.

Montero's performance of her own Piano Concerto No. 1, the 'Latin' Concerto, in Stockholm in August 2024, with the Swedish Radio Symphony Orchestra conducted by Marta Gardolińska, was featured in an episode of BBC Radio 3's Classical Live in November that year. For her solo encore, she interpreted the Improvisation on the Swedish drinking song 'Helan går' at the suggestion of a member of the audience.

Montero performed during the 2025 Nobel Peace Prize award ceremony in Oslo on 10 December was awarded to the Venezuelan opposition leader Maria Corina Machado, whose daughter Ana Corina Sosa represented her mother in acceptance of the prize. Montero played the Venezuelan anthem "Gloria al Bravo Pueblo" and Simón Díaz's "Mi querencia".

== Awards and distinctions ==
=== For CD releases ===
Montero's first CD release consisted of one disc of music by Rachmaninov, Chopin, and Liszt, and a second of improvisations. Her CD Bach and Beyond featured her improvisations on themes by Bach and topped the charts for several months. In February 2008, her follow-up recording of improvisations, Baroque, received 5-star reviews from BBC Music Magazine and Classic FM.

Montero's Bach and Beyond was given the "Choc de la musique de l'année" award in 2006 by the French magazine Le Monde de la musique. She also received the award as Keyboard Instrumentalist of the Year of the ECHO Prize in Germany. In 2007, another ECHO Prize was awarded for Bach and Beyond. In 2009, her album Baroque was nominated for a Grammy Award in two categories (Best Crossover Category and Best Producer Category). A more recent album (2015) – featuring her own composition for piano and orchestra "Ex Patria", Rachmaninov's Piano Concerto No. 2, and three of her improvisations – won the Grammy for Best Classical Album at the 2015 Latin Grammy Awards. Further, she has been profiled on CBS's 60 Minutes in a segment entitled "The Gift".

=== For creative dissent ===
In May 2024, Montero received the Václav Havel Prize for Creative Dissent for "engaging in creative dissent, exhibiting courage and creativity to challenge injustice and live in truth". At the ceremony held in June, she performed her composition Canaima: A Quintet for Piano and Strings.

== Political views ==
In 2012, she dedicated her composition Op. 1, "Ex Patria" for piano and orchestra to the more than 19,000 people killed in 2011 in Venezuela. On the occasion of her first concert in Madrid, Spain, in 2014, Montero strongly denounced the political situation in Venezuela. Even though she had given her debut as a five-year old with the Simón Bolívar Youth Orchestra under Abreu, the founder of El Sistema music education program, she said that she never was a member of El Sistema.

In 2025 Montero argued that the program had become a tool of political propaganda of the Venezuelan government. She insisted that the youth orchestra system could not be separated from Venezuela's social and political reality — including serious human rights abuses — and so could not be defended as an isolated cultural phenomenon. Montero clarified that she does not call for closing down El Sistema, but for concert halls and institutions to refuse collaborating with what she sees as a propaganda tool of a corrupt regime. Montero urged fellow artists "to show solidarity with the Venezuelan people in this hour of dire crisis, by ceasing to do business with a Venezuelan regime that continues to hold our country hostage, that refuses to recognise the will of the vast majority".

The Guardian quoted musicologist Geoffrey Baker saying "El Sistema is essentially a political organisation ... because it's run out of the office of the president and its board of directors includes high-profile politicians including Nicolás Maduro's son and Delcy Rodríguez".

Following Montero's appeal, the Venezuelan newspaper El Nacional reported some of their readers' reactions on social media. One of them wrote on X (formerly Twitter):

I don't understand the logic of boycotting El Sistema. There is no real political gain or effect, it does not politically or economically hurt the ruling elite, and sacrifices the careers of a bunch of apolitical symphony musicians trapped in the ups and downs of the Venezuelan state.

— Tony Frangie Mawad, Venezuelan journalist

== Personal life ==
Montero lives near Boston, Massachusetts, as a single mum with her two daughters.

== Compositions ==
- Op. 1, "Ex Patria", for piano and orchestra
- Piano Concerto No. 1, "Latin Concerto"
- Canaima: A Quintet for Piano and Strings

== Discography ==
- Montero: Piano Concerto No. 1; Ravel: Piano Concerto in G major, M.83 (Orchid Classics, 2019)
- Rachmaninov: Piano Concerto No. 2, Op. 18; Montero: Ex Patria, Op. 1 & Improvisations (Orchid Classics, 2015)
- Solatino (EMI Classics, 2010)
- Gautier Capuçon and Gabriela Montero: Rhapsody – Rachmaninov, Prokofiev Cello Sonatas (Virgin Classics, 2008)
- Baroque (EMI Classics, 2007)
- Bach and Beyond (EMI Classics, 2006)
- Piano Recital (EMI Classics, 2005)
- Gabriela Montero en Concert a Montreal (Palexa, 2006)
- Chopin: Piano Works (Palexa, 2007)
- Clara – Robert – Johannes: Darlings of the Muses: Piano Concerto in A minor (Clara Schumann) (Analekta, 2020)
