= Merit School of Music =

Coordinates: 41°52′51.0″N 87°39′0.1″W

Merit School of Music is a tuition free music school and nonprofit organization located in Chicago, Illinois, United States. Merit focuses on high-quality music instruction for kids and teens, offering group music classes, private lessons, and Conservatory level instruction. Merit has branches in Chicago's West Loop, Old Town, and South Shore neighborhoods, and provides in-school instruction at schools across Chicagoland.

Merit School of Music is a member of the National Guild of Community Schools of the Arts, Illinois Arts Alliance, Illinois Alliance for Arts in Education, Chicago Consortium of Community Music Schools, and the Chicago Music Alliance. Merit is accredited by the Accrediting Commission for Community and Precollegiate Arts Schools.

== History ==
Merit School of Music was founded in 1979 by Alice S. Pfaelzer and Emma Endres-Kountz in response to the elimination of music education from the Chicago Public Schools' elementary school curriculum. They had borrowed space from Roosevelt University for their tuition-free conservatory program, held on Saturday afternoons. Two years later Merit's growing enrollment created the need for a larger space and the school was moved to Chicago's Fine Arts Building. In 1987, Merit moved again to the basement of the Dearborn Station in Chicago's Printer's Row neighborhood. This location remained the school's home for the next 18 years.

By 2005, the school needed more room to accommodate its student body. After a $19 million capital campaign, Merit purchased an old TV studio in Chicago's West Loop and underwent extensive renovations to make the building musically equipped. The building is named the Joy Faith Knapp Music Center. It is located on 38 South Peoria Street.

== Programs ==
Merit's Early Childhood music classes for babies and toddlers support a child's first steps in music. The classes incorporate song, chant, movement exercises, and instrument play.

The Instrumental & Vocal Music Program (group classes) is an after-school program that includes group music classes and large ensembles.

The Private Lesson Program is offered on all instruments in both classical and jazz music. Private Lesson students perform at an annual recital and have opportunities for performance and competition throughout the year. Merit's Private Lesson Program is an option for adult music students. Merit offers lessons on weekends and weekdays during after-work hours.

The Alice S. Pfaelzer Conservatory is Merit's most advanced musical program, it is named after one of Merit's founders, Alice S. Pfaelzer. The Conservatory is for high intermediate to advanced students with at least three years of experience on their instrument. Students meet for 26 Saturdays during the school year for three to nine hours.

Merit Music in Communities (formerly known as Bridges) brings music instruction into more than 30 public, parochial, charter and private schools, and community centers, each week. Each program is designed in consultation with the Principal or Site Director. Merit Music in Communities offers group instruction on instruments, as well as in general music, early childhood, and chorus. Band and string orchestra programs are also available. Students have the opportunity to continue their musical studies and further develop their technical and musical skills in one of Merit's on-site programs.

Financial Aid & Scholarships - Merit is devoted to providing students the opportunity to grow through music by removing financial, geographic, and personal barriers, allowing them to pursue a life of excellence, accomplishment, and fulfillment. The school provides financial support through need-based tuition relief, low-cost instrument rental, and free in-school programming so that motivated students can participate in their programs regardless of economic circumstances.

== National Advisory Board ==
- Sergio Assad
- Emanuel Ax
- Daniel Barenboim
- James DePreist
- Christoph Eschenbach
- Paul Freeman
- Miriam Fried
- Lynn Harrell
- Hyo Kang
- Ramsey Lewis
- Yo-Yo Ma
- Catherine Malfitano
- Robert McDonald
- Sylvia McNair
- Midori Goto
- Samuel Ramey
- Leonard Slatkin
- André Watts
