= John Trotter Brockett =

John Trotter Brockett (1788–1842), was a British attorney, antiquarian, numismatist, and philologist.

== Life ==
Brockett was born at Witton Gilbert, County Durham. In his early youth his parents moved to Gateshead, and he was educated under the care of the Rev. William Turner of Newcastle. The law having been selected as his profession, he was, after the usual course of study, admitted an attorney, and practiced for many years at Newcastle, where he was respected as an able and eloquent advocate in the mayor's and sheriff's courts, and a sound lawyer in the branches of his profession which deal with tenures and conveyancing.

He was a man of refined tastes, and a close student of numismatics and of English antiquities and philology. He made considerable collections of books and coins and medals, in 1820 by Mr Sotheby over 15 days with 1715 lots, the sale was held at Wellington St, The Strand. The choice library and cabinets which he had formed up to that time were dispersed by auction, the sale of the latter occupying fifteen days [Sotheby Catalogue dated Tuesday 14th March 1820 and all lots 1715 were printed in 1 catalogue], and that of the latter fourteen days.

Brockett was a member of the Society of Antiquaries of London, a secretary of the Newcastle Literary and Philosophical Society, and one of the council of the Society of Antiquaries of Newcastle-on-Tyne. He died at Albion Place, Newcastle, on 12 October 1842, aged 54.

== Publications ==
In 1818 he published Hints on the Propriety of establishing a Typographical Society in Newcastle (8vo, pp. 8), which led to the foundation of such a society, and gave an impulse to the production of an interesting series of privately printed tracts at Newcastle. To that series he himself contributed several works, including:

- A Catalogue of Books and Tracts printed at the private press of George Allan, Esq., at Darlington, 1818; relates to George Allan.
- Bartlet's Episcopal Coins of Durham, new edition by J. T. B., 1817.
- Beauvais' Essay on the means of distinguishing Antique from Counterfeit Coins and Medals, translated and edited by J. T. B., 1819.
- Selecta Numismata Aurea Imperatorum Romanorum e Museo J. T. B., 1822.

Also reprints of tracts on Henry III; on Robert, Earl of Salisbury; and of three accounts of the siege of Newcastle.

In 1818 he published an Enquiry into the Question whether the Freeholders of the Town and County of Newcastle-upon-Tyne are entitled to vote for Members of Parliament for the County of Northumberland, and in 1825 the first edition of his Glossary of North Country Words in Use (Newcastle-on-Tyne, 8vo). The manuscript collections for this valuable work were not originally intended for publication, and they passed into the library of John George Lambton, afterwards Lord Durham, but that gentleman surrendered them for the public service.

A second edition, to a large extent rewritten, was published in 1829; and a third was in preparation at the time of the author's death, and was published, under the editorship of W. E. Brockett, in 1846 (2 vols. 8vo).

=== Papers ===
He also contributed papers to the first three volumes of Archæologia Æliana. In 1882 a Glossographia Anglicana, from a manuscript left by Brockett, was privately printed by the society, called "The sette of odd volumes",' with a biographical sketch of the author by Frederick B. Coomer of Newcastle, who names one or two tracts by Brockett not noted above, and memoirs by him of Thomas and John Bewick, prefixed to the 1820 edition of Bewick's Select Fables.
