= Igor Begelman =

American clarinetist

Igor Begelman is a virtuoso clarinet player. He has performed solos with a number of orchestras. He also plays chamber music, and is a member of the TAGI ensemble (formerly known as the New York Lyric Chamber Players).

== Discography ==
- 20th Century Russian Chamber Music / 8th Tucson Winter Chamber Music Festival
- Kupferman: Moon Music 2000 on Soundspells
- Here of Amazing Most Now on Albany Records

== Awards ==
- 2000 Avery Fisher Career Grant
- 1994 Grace Woodson Memorial Award
- Second prize at the first Carl Nielsen International Clarinet Competition in 1997
- 2010 BRIO award
