= June Carpenter =

American Sabbathday Lake Shaker (1938–2026)

June Carpenter (1938 – November 3, 2026) was an American Shaker at Sabbathday Lake Shaker Village in Maine.

Carpenter came from Brookline, Massachusetts. In 1987, aged 49, she converted. Before becoming a Shaker, she worked in library sciences. After volunteering at the Shaker Library in New Gloucester, Maine, she decided to join their faith.

Carpenter died on November 3, 2026, at the age of 88. Before her death she was one of only three living members of the Shaker faith living and working in Sabbathday Lake Shaker Village, along with Brother Arnold Hadd. They, along with community volunteers, operate a farm, a store, and provide tours of the village.
