= Henry Clay Blinn =

American Shaker leader, writer, and artist

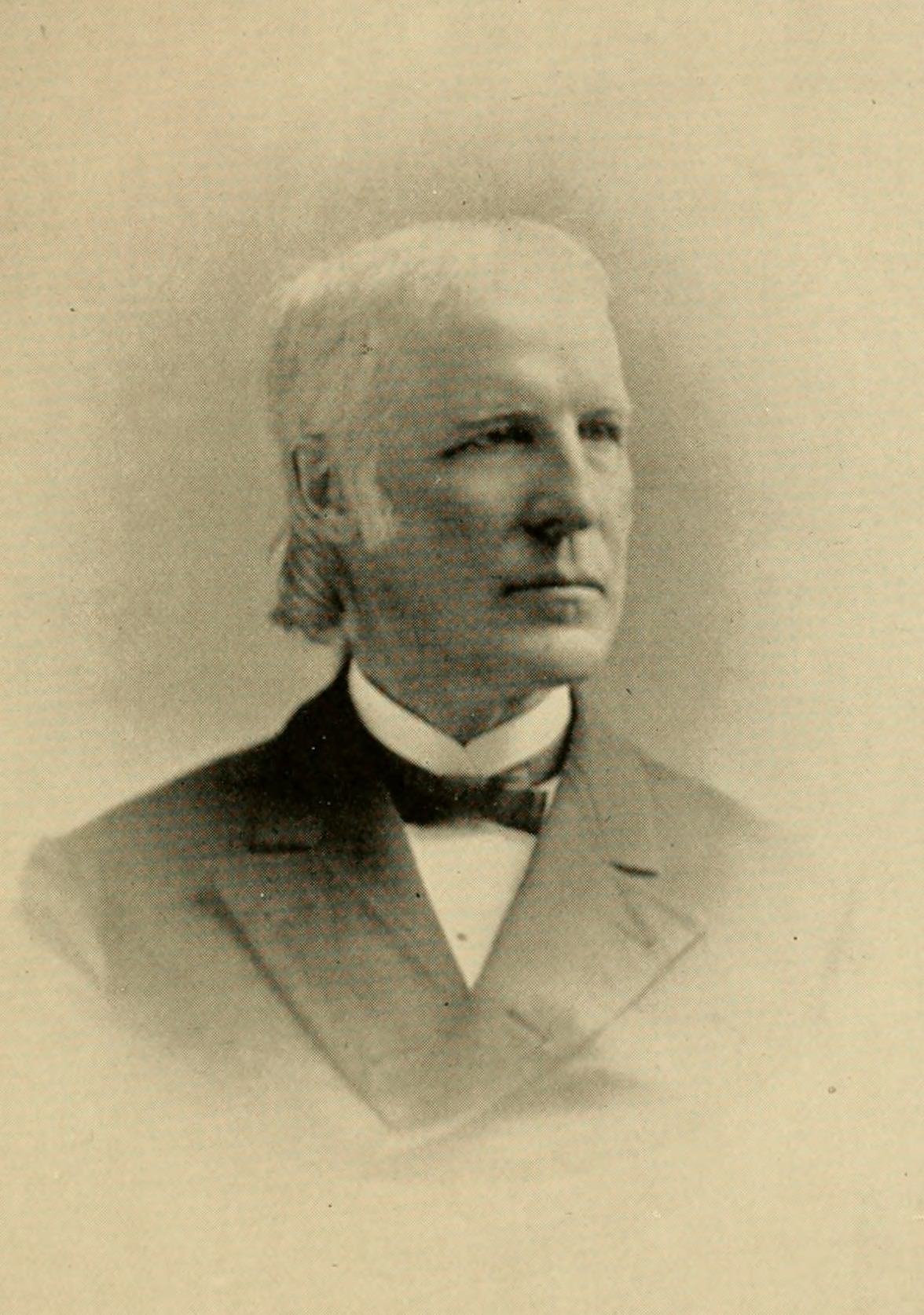
Portrait of Henry Clay Blinn

Henry Clay Blinn (July 16, 1824 – April 1, 1905) was an American Shaker leader, writer, and artist.

Blinn was a native of Providence, Rhode Island, and began his career apprenticed first to a tailor and then to a jeweler in that city. In 1838 he joined the Shaker community in Canterbury, New Hampshire, where he would remain for the rest of his life. In 1841 he became boys' caretaker, a job he was forced to give up in 1849 when he was assigned to the print shop. Soon he returned to the caretaker position, only to leave it in 1852 upon his appointment as Second Elder under Robert Fowle. Three months later he became a member of the Ministry as second to Elder Abraham Perkins. He became First Elder of the Church Family in November 1865, and took charge of the public meeting in 1865, remaining in that role until public meeting at Canterbury ceased in 1889.

During his life Blinn occupied various roles including printer, typesetter, publisher, writer, teacher, beekeeper, dentist, tailor, tinware maker and repairer, and cabinetmaker. He edited the Shaker Society's monthly journal, The Manifesto, and chronicled the community's history. He was also a maker of illustrated maps, although only three examples are known from his hand. They depict Canterbury and two communities in New York, Watervliet and New Lebanon, and are counted among the most important of their type. The image of Canterbury, made in 1848, is the largest and most elaborate of all such Shaker maps at nearly seven feet in length. As a printer he produced, among other things, a pair of miniature books for children, The Little Instructor and Dew Drops of Wisdom. He also edited two hymnals, A Sacred Repository of Anthems and Hymns of 1852 and A Collection of Hymns and Anthems Adapted to Public Worship of 1892. Blinn was a mentor to Cora Helena Sarle in her early years at Canterbury, and was responsible for introducing her to the art of botanical illustration.

Blinn's 1839 map of New Lebanon is currently owned by the American Folk Art Museum. Several pieces of his cabinetry survive as well, including a sewing desk of about 1870, a dining table, a slant-front desk, and a large secretary, among other surviving pieces. Several items by his hand, including copies of the miniature books, are in the collection of the Shaker Museum, Mount Lebanon.
