= Canterbury Shaker Village =

United States historic place

Coordinates: 43°21′32″N 71°29′24″W

- U.S. National Register of Historic Places
- U.S. National Historic Landmark District
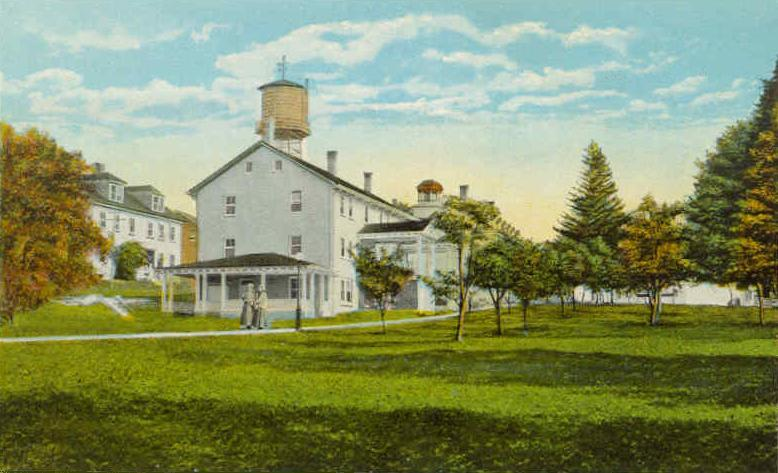
- Shaker Village c. 1920

- Location within New Hampshire
- Nearest city: 288 Shaker Road, Canterbury, New Hampshire
- Built: 1792
- NRHP reference No.: 75000129

Significant dates
- Added to NRHP: June 17, 1975
- Designated NHLD: April 19, 1993

Canterbury Shaker Village Spiritual name: Holy Ground
- Shaker community
- Interactive map of Canterbury Shaker Village
- Bishopric: Canterbury
- Established: 1792
- Declared a National Historic Landmark: 1993

Population (1840)
  - Maximum: 260
- Families: Church, Second, North, West

Canterbury Shaker Village is a historic site and museum in Canterbury, New Hampshire, United States. It was one of a number of Shaker communities founded in the 19th century.

It is one of the most intact and authentic surviving Shaker community sites, and was declared a National Historic Landmark in 1993.

The site is operated by a non-profit organization established in 1969 to preserve the heritage of the Canterbury Shakers. Canterbury Shaker Village is an internationally known, non-profit museum and historic site with 27 original Shaker buildings, four reconstructed Shaker buildings and 694 acres (2.81 km^{2}) of forests, fields, gardens and mill ponds under permanent conservation easement. Canterbury Shaker Village "is dedicated to preserving the 200-year legacy of the Canterbury Shakers and to providing a place for learning, reflection and renewal of the human spirit."

== History ==
=== Origins and growth ===
The Canterbury site was one of two communities existing in what was known as the New Hampshire Bishopric, which contained Canterbury village and the Shaker Village of Enfield. A bishopric was composed of two or more communities in the same area or geographical location. They were designed as a way to organize communications and events amongst villages and acted as an administrative unit, which represented the governing body of the United Society of Believers.

In 1782 Israel Chauncey and Ebeneezer Cooley from the Mount Lebanon village of Shakers traveled to Canterbury and converted several prominent figures of the community. These figures included Benjamin and Mary Whitcher and the Wiggin and Sanborn families, who later donated land to house the Canterbury Village community of Shakers. Through a donation of land from local community members, the Canterbury Village was founded in 1792, led by Father Job Bishop. The village expanded over time, and in 1803 there were 159 members in three families. Nearly fifty years later in 1850, the site contained 3,000 acres (12 km^{2}) with a community of 300 housed in 100 buildings.

=== Modernization ===
Over the period in which the Canterbury Village existed as a working Shaker community, various inventions from mainstream society were adopted by its members. As Stephen Stein highlights in his definitive guide to the Shaker society, The Shaker Experience, "New means of transportation, sources of power, complex machinery, and communication devices transformed community life and came to symbolize the views of modern Believers."

In 1901 the New England Telephone Company installed telephones at the Canterbury Village site. As Stein outlined, this would have changed community life in the sense that the installation of the telephone eradicated the need for long distance travel between Shaker communities.

The Canterbury Village had its own powerhouse constructed in 1910. The cost of the powerhouse was $8,000, and at first the generator powered the electric lights in sixteen community buildings. The Canterbury members were also given a television set after its invention in the 1950s by friends of the community.

The Shakers of Canterbury also had laborsaving inventions of their own, which contributed greatly to their economy. The Canterbury Shakers patented a washing machine, an accomplishment that was recognized by mainstream society in the form of a gold medal at the Centennial Exposition in 1876.

Music was an important part of Shaker life at Canterbury. Among the many Canterbury Shaker spirituals are the hymn "Celestial Praises" from 1841, and the song "We Will All Go Home with You" from 1862. Between 1842 and 1908 there were eleven different Shaker hymnals published by the Shakers at Canterbury.

=== Decline ===
Historical population
Year	Pop.	±%
1803	159	—
1840	260	+63.5%
1850	300	+15.4%
1860	240	−20.0%
1870	177	−26.2%
1905	100	−43.5%
1916	49	−51.0%
1950	16	−67.3%
1990	2	−87.5%
1992	1	−50.0%

In 1905, there were 100 members, and by 1916, the Shakers in Canterbury had dwindled to just 49, 47 women and two men. In addition, there were 12 females under the age of 21 as well as one non-Shaker who had been living in the village for seven years.

The last male member of the Canterbury Village, Brother Irving Greenwood, died in 1939.

In 1947, when LIFE reporter Nina Leen visited the village, there were 16 sisters remaining, ranging in age from 43 to 80.

In 1957, after "months of prayer", Eldresses Gertrude, Emma, and Ida, the leaders of the United Society of Believers and who were based out of Canterbury, voted to close the Shaker Covenant, the document which all new members need to sign to become members of the Shakers. In 1988, speaking about the three men and women in their 20s and 30s who had joined the Shakers and were living in the Sabbathday Lake Shaker Village, Eldress Bertha Lindsay stated, "To become a Shaker you have to sign a legal document taking the necessary vows and that document, the official covenant, is locked up in our safe. Membership is closed forever."

By as early as 1980, Canterbury Shaker Village had opened to visitors as a historic site, with tours, greetings by some of the few remaining Shakers, and a gift shop, called "Simple Gifts". In 1992, it received 60,000 visitors from all 50 US states and 45 countries.

In 1988, Eldress Gertrude Soule died, leaving only two Shakers left at Canterbury Village, Eldress Bertha Lindsay and Sister Ethel Hudson, aged 93 and 96, respectively. Bertha Lindsay, the last Shaker eldress, died on 3 October 1990, leaving only one Shaker at Canterbury, Sister Ethel Hudson. By September 1992, she had died at the age of 96.

== Governance ==
The Shakers were organized in a hierarchical system of four levels. The first level to which every member of the community was involved was the family. Above the family were members known as elders and eldresses, deacons and deaconesses. The third level usually consisted of two men and two women who formed a ministry, which governed over the individual communities. Finally, the fourth level was the bishopric, which governed the local communities.

== Buildings ==
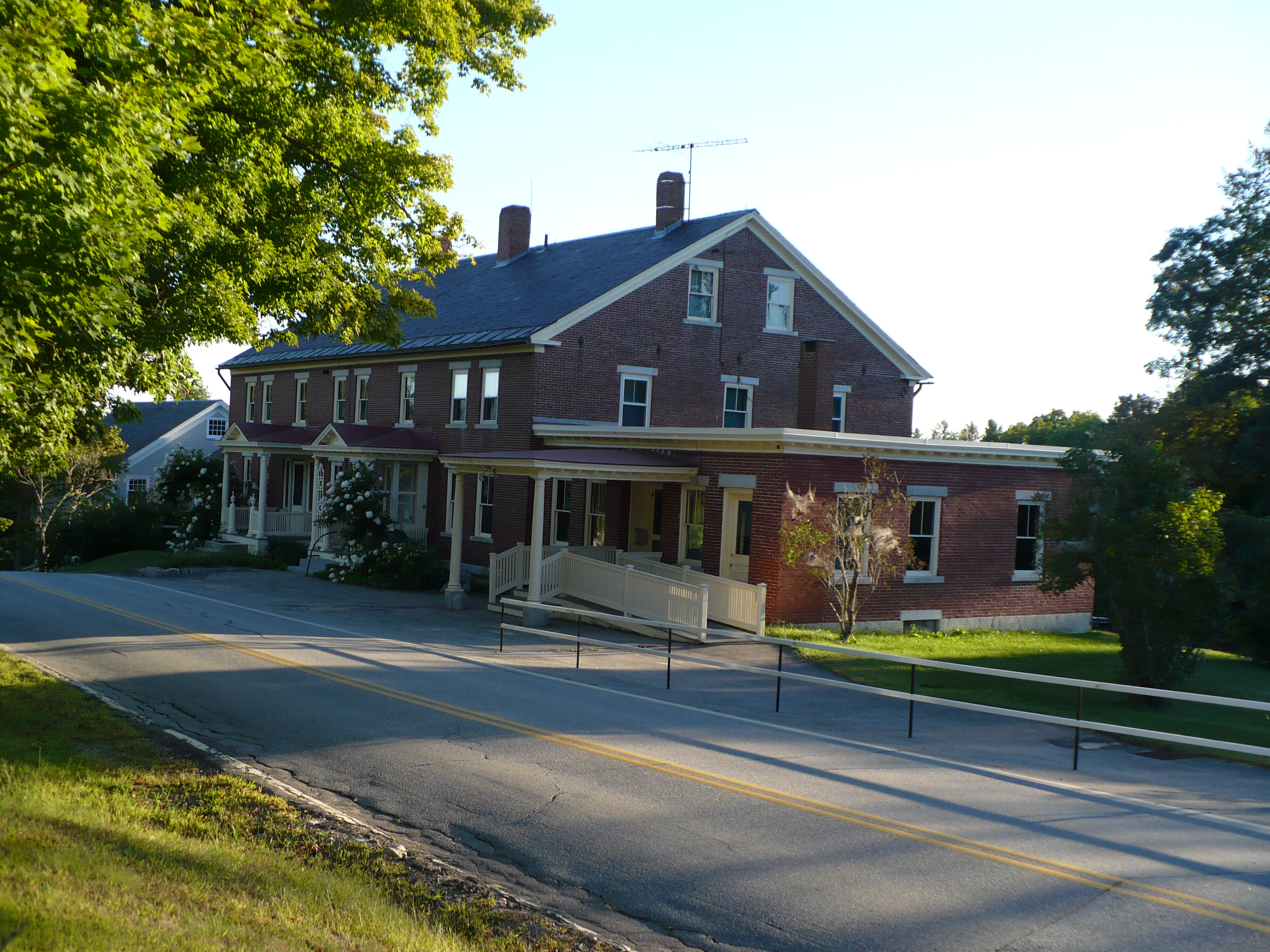
Trustees office

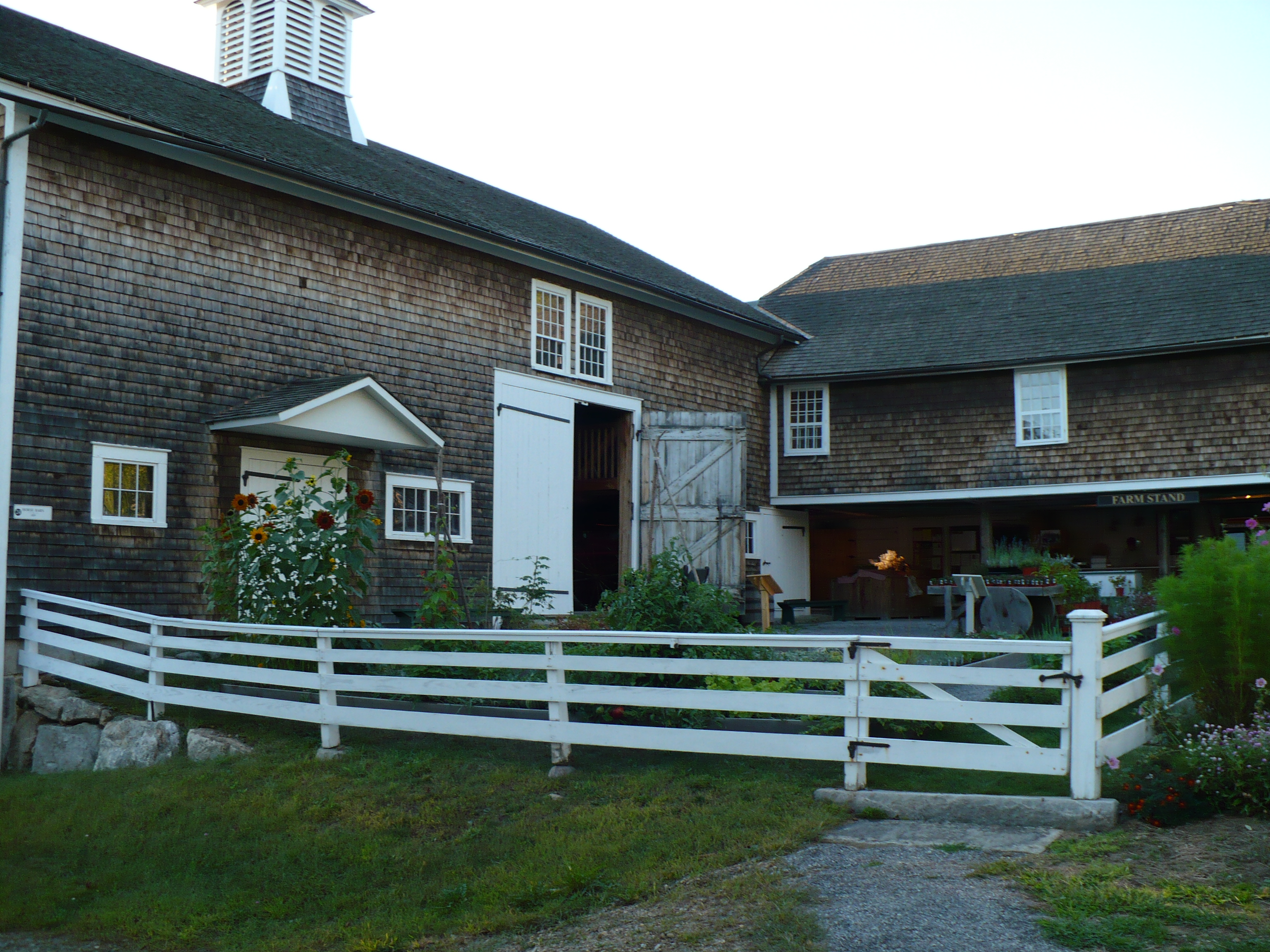
Horse barn

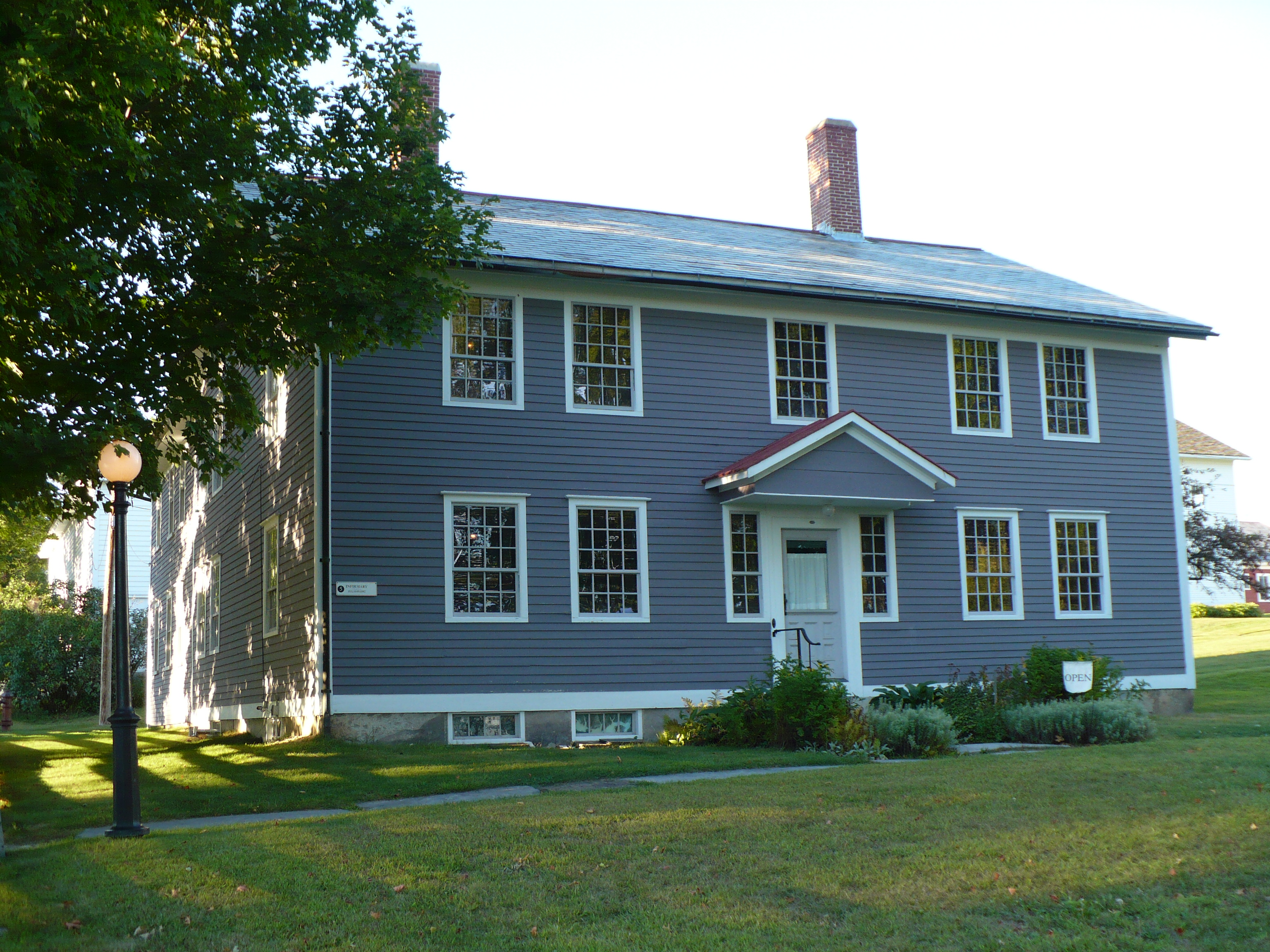
Infirmary
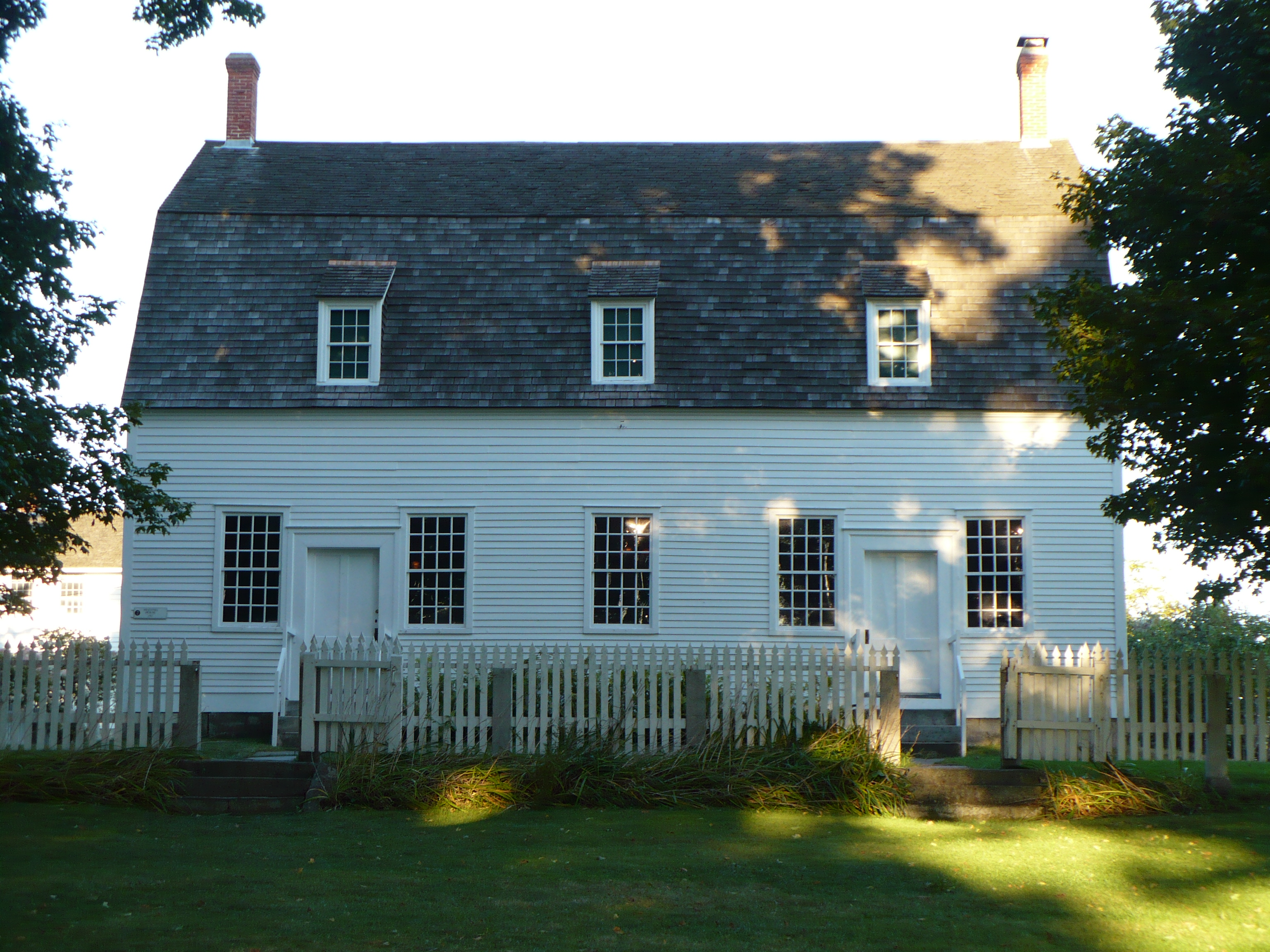
Meetinghouse

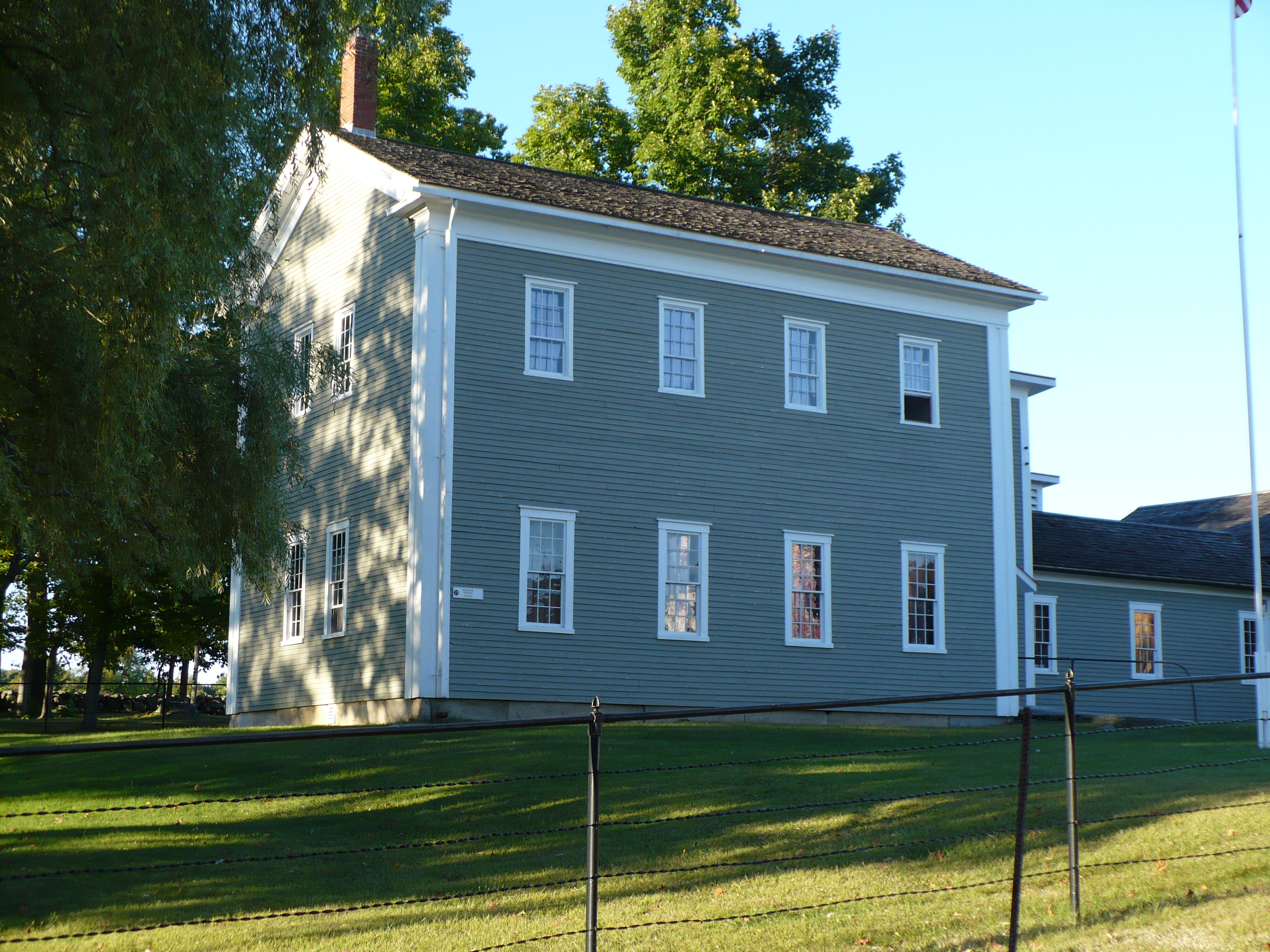
Schoolhouse

== Notable residents ==
- Henry Clay Blinn, Elder, artist, and writer
- Thomas Corbett, physician
- Cora Helena Sarle, watercolor artist
- Mary Whitcher, the "Shaker poetess"

== See also ==
- List of National Historic Landmarks in New Hampshire
- National Register of Historic Places listings in Merrimack County, New Hampshire
- New Hampshire Historical Marker No. 15: Shaker Village
- Pleasant Hill, Kentucky, a Shaker community
- Shaker Seed Company
