= Sabbathday Lake Shaker Village =

- U.S. National Register of Historic Places
- U.S. National Historic Landmark District
- View of the village by Carol M. Highsmith, with the schoolhouse and library on the right

- Location within Maine Location within the United States
- Location: New Gloucester, Maine
- Coordinates: 43°59′11″N 70°21′58.6″W
- Built: 1782, 1783, or 1793
- Website: maineshakers.com
- NRHP reference No.: 74000318

Significant dates
- Added to NRHP: September 13, 1974
- Designated NHLD: May 30, 1974

Sabbathday Lake Shaker Village is a Shaker village near New Gloucester and Poland, Maine, in the United States. It is the last active Shaker community, with two members as of 2026. The community was established in either 1782, 1783, or 1793, at the height of the Shaker movement in the United States. The Sabbathday Lake meetinghouse was built in 1794. The entire property was declared a National Historic Landmark in 1974.

== The Shakers ==
The Shakers were originally located in England in 1747, in the home of Mother Ann Lee (1736-1784). They developed from the religious group called the Quakers which originated in the 17th century. Both groups believed that everybody could find God within him or herself, rather than through clergy or rituals, but the Shakers tended to be more emotional and demonstrative in their worship. Shakers also believed that their lives should be dedicated to pursuing perfection, continuously confessing their sins, and attempting a cessation of sinning.

The Shakers migrated to Colonial America in 1774 in pursuit of religious freedom. They built 19 communal settlements that attracted some 20,000 converts over the next century. The first Shaker village was built in New Lebanon, New York, at the Mount Lebanon Shaker Society. The other 18 communities were built in Maine, New Hampshire, Massachusetts, Connecticut, New York, Kentucky, Ohio, Indiana, Georgia and Florida. Strict believers in celibacy, Shakers maintained their numbers through conversion and adoption of orphans. The group reached its maximum size of about 6,000 full members in 1840.

== History of Sabbathday Lake Shakers ==
The Shaker settlement at Sabbathday Lake was established by a group of Shaker missionaries in 1782, and was then known as Thompson's Pond Plantation. The first members were from Gorham, Maine. The community grew to over two hundred members in less than a year. Its location in Cumberland County, Maine, made it the most northern and eastern of all the Shaker communes. They raised their meetinghouse in April 1794 and built their first dwelling across the road in 1795.

The Sabbathday Lake community grew to a size of 1,900 acres (770 ha) with 26 large buildings by 1850. Buildings on the grounds included the meetinghouse and the Brethren's Shop, which still holds a working blacksmith shop and woodworking operation. A large new Central Dwelling House was built in 1883 or 1884. The Shakers strived to be as self-sufficient as possible, while being an active part of the community. They built a mill and farm that enabled them to sell produce and commercial goods to the outside world.

== Membership ==
By 1800, more than 140 believers lived at Sabbathday Lake community. By 1850, only 70 Shakers lived in the Sabbathday Lake Church Family at New Gloucester. The 1880 census listed 43 living at Sabbathday Lake. Membership hovered around that level until the 1930s, when only about 30 members remained. Membership continued to decline with only two members living as of September 2024, though the Shakers accept new people who wish to join them. Sister April Baxter joined in 2025, increasing the number of Shakers in the community to three. Sister June Carpenter died in November 2026, leaving only Baxter and Brother Arnold Hadd as living members.

== Covenant ==
In 1957, after "months of prayer", Eldresses Gertrude, Emma, and Ida, the leaders of the United Society of Believers and members of another Shaker settlement, Canterbury Shaker Village, voted to close their Shaker Covenant, the document which they claimed that new members need to sign to become members. In 1988, speaking about the three men and women in their 20s and 30s who had joined the Shakers and were living in the Sabbathday Lake Shaker Village, Eldress Bertha Lindsay said, "To become a Shaker you have to sign a legal document taking the necessary vows and that document, the official covenant, is locked up in our safe. Membership is closed forever." The Sabbathday Lake Shaker Village is a separate Shaker settlement in its own right and continues to seek new persons to become member Shakers.

The Sabbathday Lake Shakers reopened their worship services to the public in 1963.

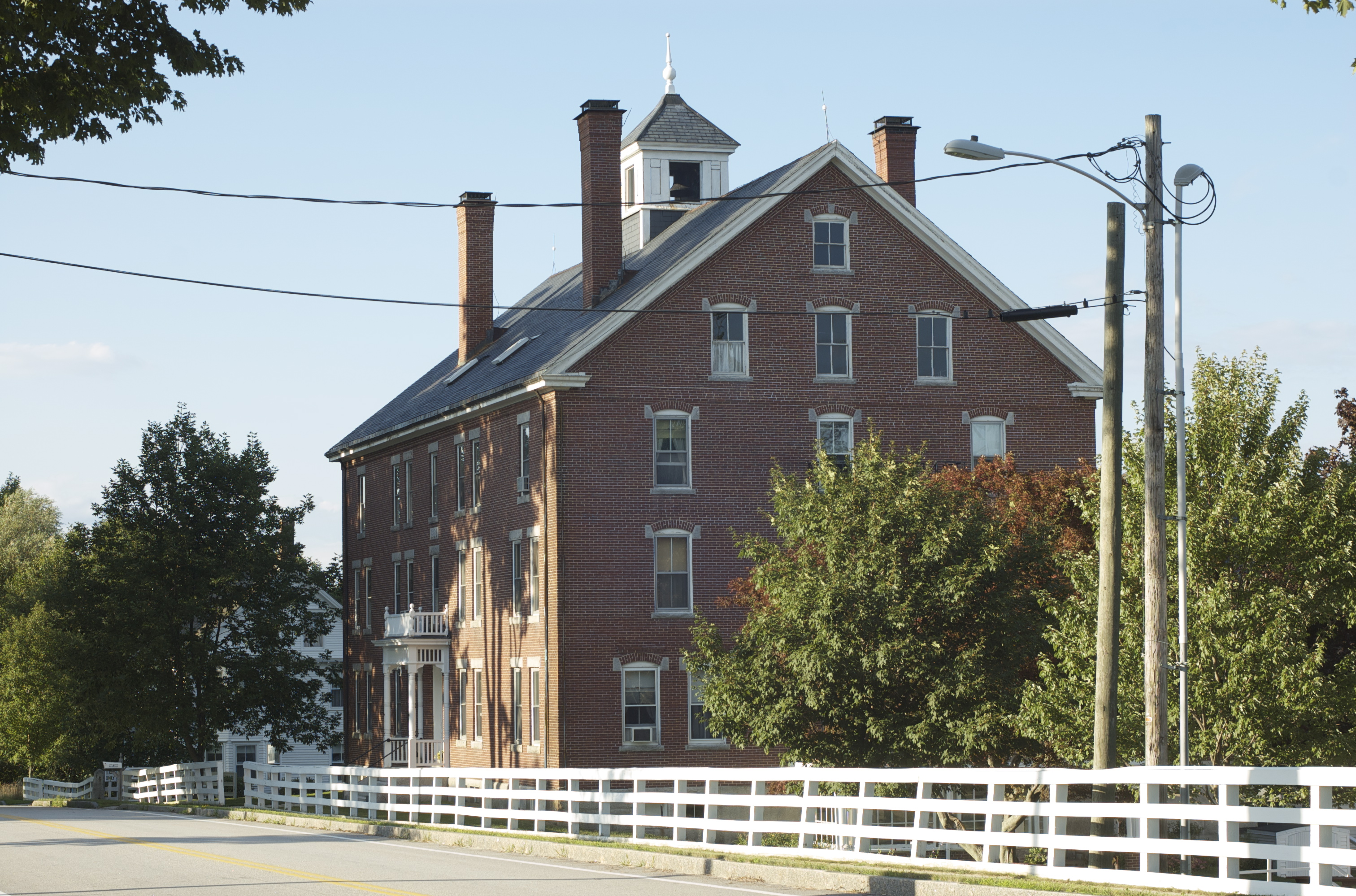
The central dwelling house

== In the twenty-first century ==
Membership to the community is still open, and occasionally "novices" explore joining the society.

As of 2006, the Sabbathday Lake Shaker Village has 14 working buildings, including the Central Dwelling House, which includes a music room, chapel, kitchen, and large dining room. The community still holds regular Public Meetings (worship services) on Sundays in the 1794 meetinghouse.

Another building with historical significance is the Shaker Library, which houses a rich collection of Shaker records for historical research.

Other historic buildings include the Cart and Carriage Shed, Ox Barn, The Girl's Shop, Herb House, Brooder House, Wood House, a garage built in 1910 for the group's first car, stable, Summer House, and the Laundry building. The village, which attracts up to 10,000 visitors a year, has been open to the public since 1931, when the Shaker Museum and Library was established.

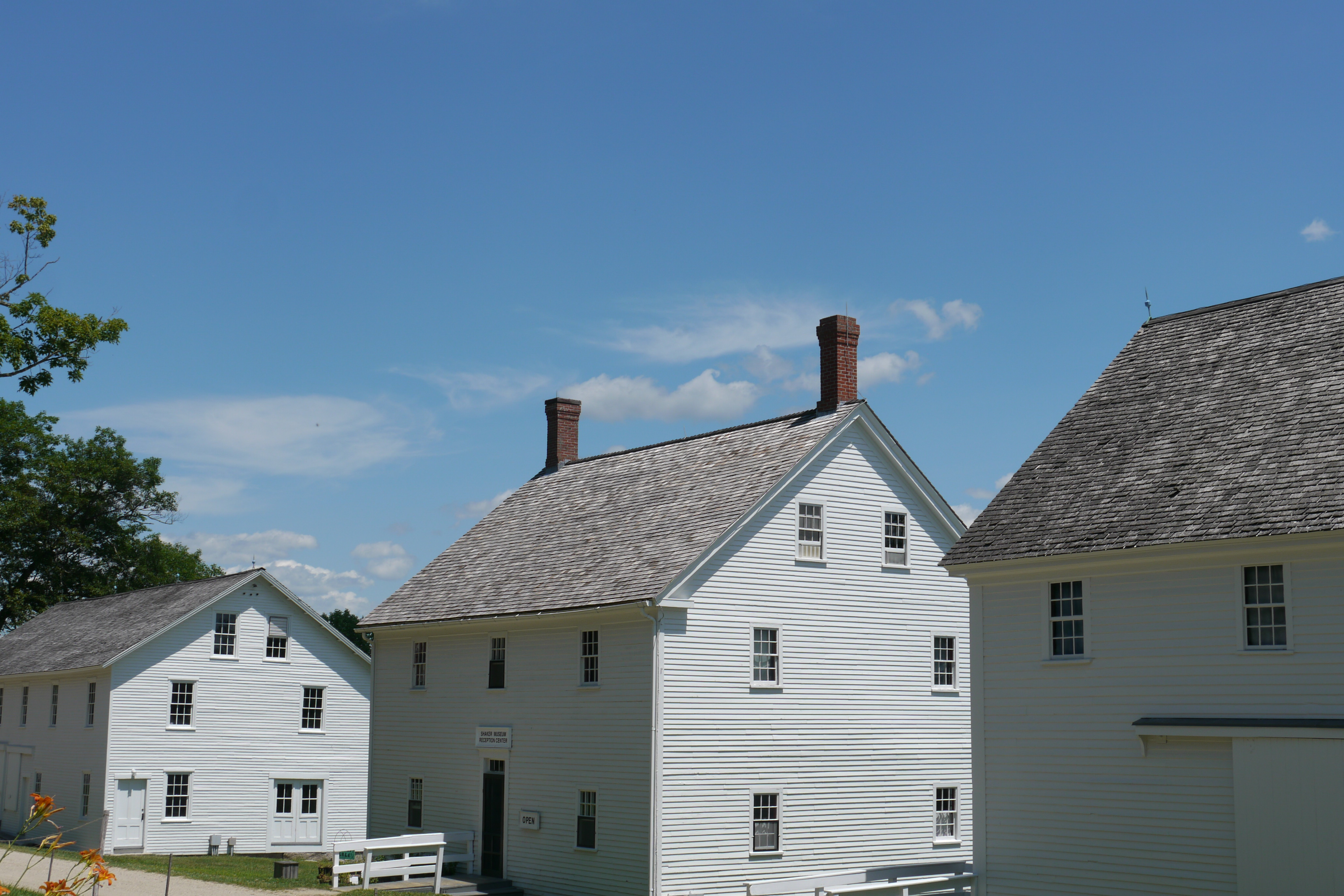
Sabbathday Lake Shaker Village

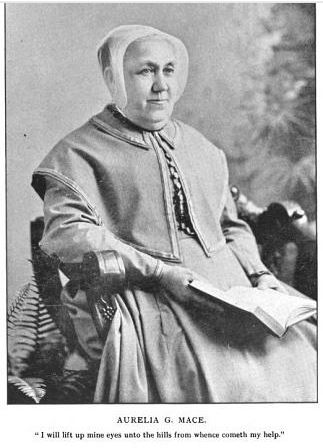
Aurelia Gay Mace, leader of Sabbathday Lake Shaker Village and author of The Aletheia: Spirit of Truth, a Series of Letters in Which the Principles of the United Society Known as Shakers are Set Forth and Illustrated, 1899, and The Mission and Testimony of the Shakers of the Twentieth Century to the World, 1904

The Sabbathday Lake Shaker Museum is the largest repository of Maine Shaker culture. Examples of furniture, oval boxes, woodenware, metal and tin wares, technology and tools, "fancy" sales goods, costume and textiles, visual arts, and herbal and medicinal products are among the 13,000 artifacts currently in the Sabbathday Lake collection. Although the collection represents every Shaker Community known to have existed, special emphasis has been placed upon preserving the heritage of the Maine Shaker Communities, including Sabbathday Lake, Poland Hill, Gorham, and Alfred.

== Present and future ==
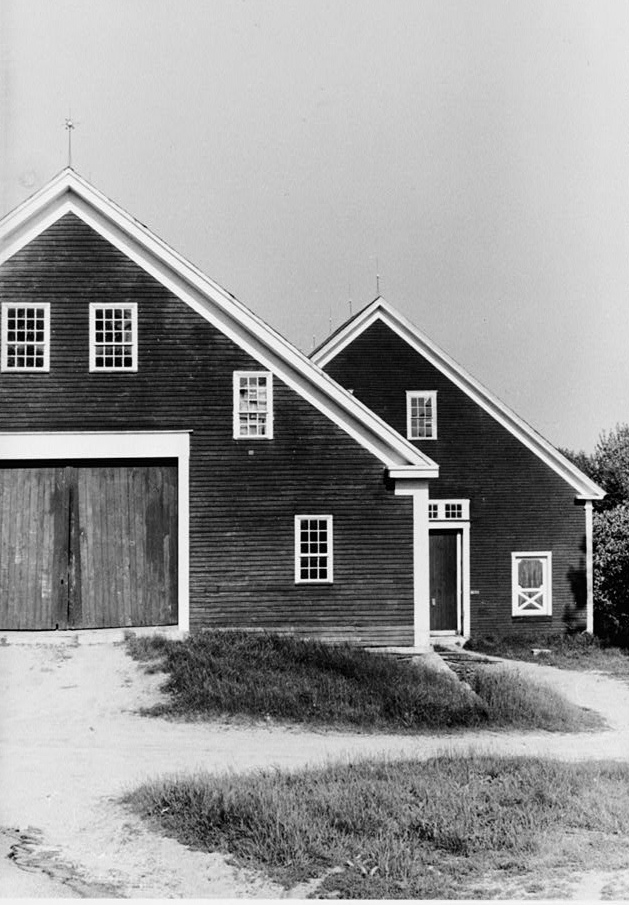
Barns at Sabbathday Lake Village

As Shakers are celibate, new members cannot be born into the group and must join from the outside. Many prospective members regard celibacy as a major obstacle which keeps them from joining. Current members have taken steps to ensure that Sabbathday Lake Village will remain largely unchanged when the final members of the group die.

The 1,643 acres (665 ha) of land owned by the Shakers in both Cumberland County and Androscoggin County include Sabbathday Lake which is 340 acres (140 ha) with 5,000 feet (1,500 m) of undeveloped shoreline with a beach that is open to the public and the 150 acres (61 ha) Shaker Bog. Other dismantled Shaker villages were converted into housing lots or prisons. In order to avoid this fate at Sabbathday Lake, the Shakers took some preventive measures in 2001.

Preservation and conservation easements were sold to Maine Preservation and the New England Forestry Foundation. These two groups, with the help of eight other public and non-profit agencies, are working to cover cost of the easements. The village and surrounding farmland and forests will be protected from development. Brother Arnold Hadd was quoted by the Boston Globe in 2006. "We can't put up a Wal-Mart. Or a housing development. The land always has to remain for agricultural and forest purposes."

The sale of future development rights has enabled the Shakers to restore and maintain the structures of the village. They also make money by leasing 29 cottage lots on Sabbathday Lake, leasing 1,000 acres (400 ha) of forests, 30 acres (12 ha) of farmland and orchards and a gravel pit. Other income sources include production of fancy goods, basket making, weaving, printing, and the manufacturing of some small woodenware. Their operation is run with the help of six year-round employees and six seasonal employees.

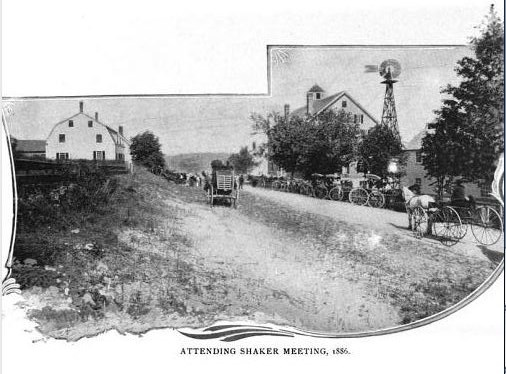
Attending Shaker meeting, at Sabbathday Lake, 1886

On January 2, 2017, the community announced that female community member Sister Frances Carr had died that day. With Carr's death, Sister June Carpenter and Brother Arnold Hadd remained. The Spring/Summer 2019 issue of The Clarion, the Shakers' newsletter, makes reference to an additional Shaker in the community, Brother Andrew. In 2025, Sister April Baxter was announced to have joined the community, bringing the official number of members to 3. Sister June Carpenter passed away on November 3, 2026.

== Community life ==
This community was one of the smaller Shaker groups during the sect's heyday. They farm and practice a variety of handicrafts; a Shaker Museum and Sunday services are open to visitors. Mother Ann Lee is celebrated on the first Sunday of August to commemorate the arrival of the English Shakers in America in 1774. The congregation sings and a Mother Ann cake is presented.

The daily schedule of a Shaker in Sabbathday Lake Village is as follows:

- The day begins at 7:30 am; the Great Bell on Dwelling House rings, calling everyone to breakfast.
- At 8:00 am morning prayers start. Two Psalms are read, then passages are read from elsewhere in the Bible. Following this is communal prayer and silent prayer, concluded with the singing of a Shaker hymn.
- Work for the Shakers begins at 8:30.
- Work stops at 11:30 for midday prayers.
- Lunch begins at 12:00. This is the main meal for the Shakers.
- Work continues at 1:00 pm.
- At 6:00 it is supper time, the last meal of the day.
- On Wednesdays at 5:00 pm they hold a prayer meeting which is followed by a Shaker Studies class.

The last two Shakers own all the property communally, and confess their sins to each other. The village regularly receives visitors, and Arnold and June teach them how to make soap and bind books. The money generated from these workshops keeps the village alive.

== Shaker Trust ==
To preserve their legacy, as well as their idyllic lakeside property at Sabbathday Lake Shaker Village, the Shakers announced in October 2005 that they had entered into a trust with the state of Maine and several conservation groups. Under this agreement, the Shakers will sell conservation easements to the trust, allowing the village to stave off development and continue operations as long as there are Shakers to live there.

The agreement does not specify whether the property will become a park, museum, or other public space should the Shakers die out. That decision would be made by a nonprofit corporation—the United Society of Shakers, Sabbathday Lake Inc.—whose board members are largely non-Shakers. The $3.7 million conservation plan relies on grants, donations, and public funds.

== See also ==
- Shaker Seed Company
- List of National Historic Landmarks in Maine
- National Register of Historic Places listings in Cumberland County, Maine
