= Aurelia Mace =

American Shaker writer (1835–1910)

Aurelia Gay Mace
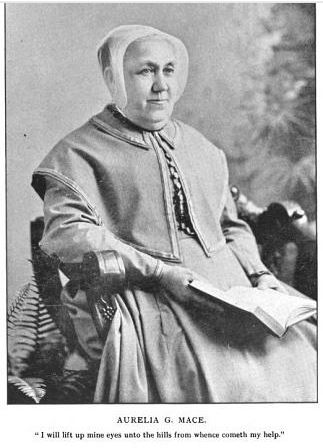
- Born: March 6, 1835; Strong, Maine
- Died: March 30, 1910 (aged 75); New Gloucester, Maine
- Known for: Shaker writer and thinker
- Notable work: The Aletheia: Spirit of Truth

Aurelia Mace (March 6, 1835– March 30, 1910) was a Shaker eldress, thinker, and writer. She is known for her letters and essays which were compiled into the book The Aletheia: Spirit of Truth.

== Biography ==
Mace was born on March 6, 1836, in Strong, Maine to Universalist minister Marquis de Lafayette Mace and Sarah Norton Flint. She was the youngest of six girls and two boys. When she was a year old, her family joined the United Society of Believers In Christ. Lafayette Mace later left the Shaker community with his wife and son. Aurelia helped her mother return when Sarah found it difficult to live in the outside world. Mace continued to care for her in the nearby Poland Hill Village as she aged. This filial bond was uncommon in the nineteenth century Shaker community.

Mace studied with the Shakers at East Canterbury, New Hampshire. At twenty-three years old, she officially joined the Society of Believers in Sabbathday Lake. Mace taught from 1853 to 1880. As a teacher, Mace advocated for a modern schoolhouse, leading to the construction of one in 1880.

Mace served as second eldress from 1860 to 1866 and 1869–1880. In this position, she took on a motherly role the older girls and youngest sisters and helped nurture their faith. Pace called the ten women she had guided who later joined the Shaker faith (nine as children in the 1860s, and one as an adult in the 1873) her "gems of priceless worth".

In 1896, Mace became a trustee, a position she held until her death. As a trustee, she worked with the external community and helped manage finances. Notably, Mace held an active role in the establishment of the Shaker brush industry. She also introduced Shaker lemon syrup and balsam pillows to the public.

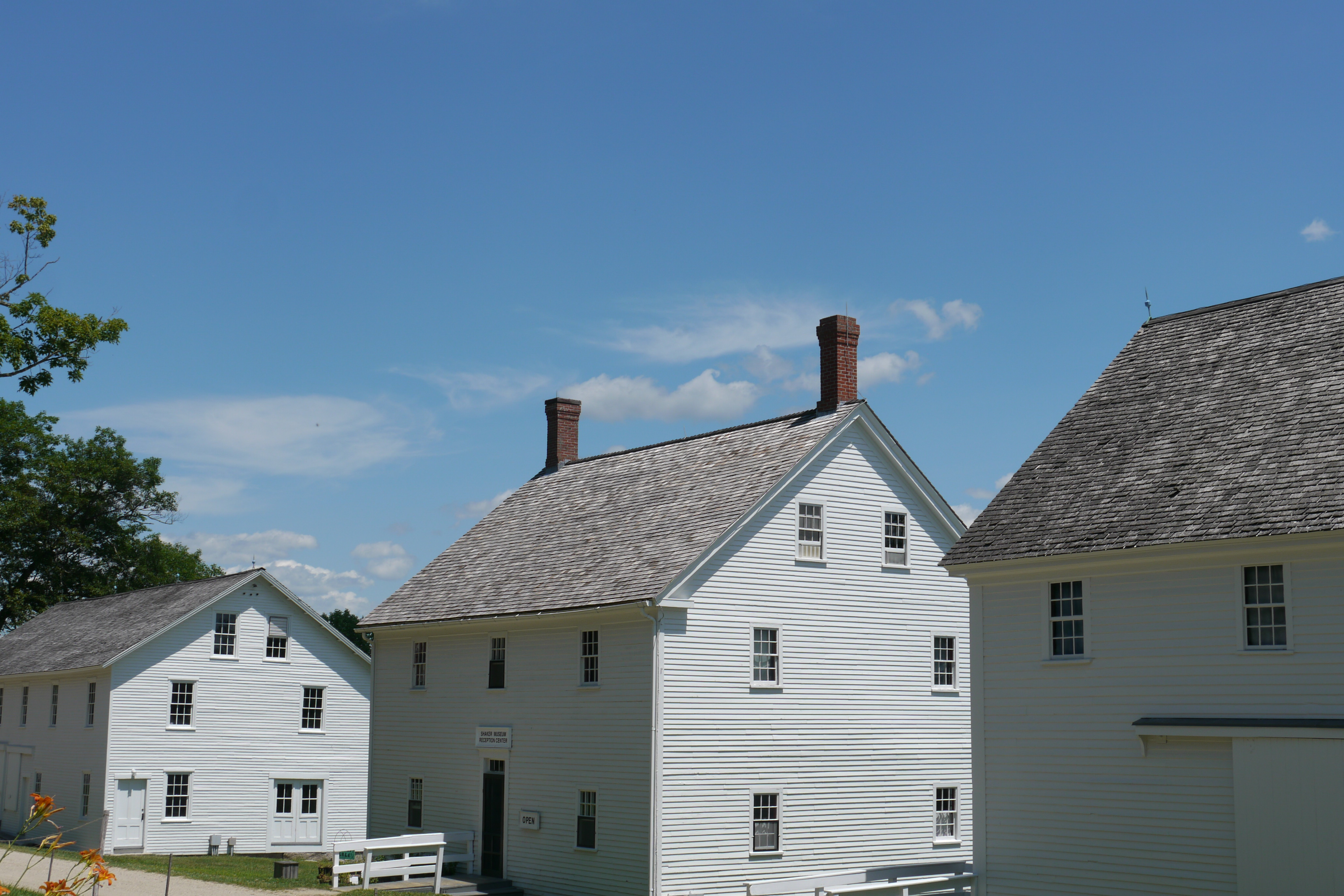
Sabbathday Lake Shaker Village

Mace was a prolific writer of letters, historical vignettes, religious meditations, eulogies, and lectures. She regularly wrote for the Shaker Manifesto and published several letters in the Messenger. A collection of her letters and essays, The Aletheia: Spirit of Truth was published in 1899. This book aimed to make the Shaker community better known to the public. This book, which speaks extensively of Shaker founder Ann Lee, became one of the primary theological Shaker texts of its time. Its success established Sabbathday Lake as a part of the Shaker intellectual community. A second edition was published in 1907.

Mace also kept a journal as a part of her personal practice. She corresponded regularly with many people, including Leo Tolstoy. From 1888 to 1909, Mace kept the Church Family journal. Mace's writings serve not only as theological texts but also provide insight into the lives of Shaker women.

In the 1890s, Mace, along with other Shakers including Anna White, began to refer to themselves as "Alethians", or "Truth-Followers". Mace, along with White and Leila S. Taylor, became one of the primary Shaker spokeswomen for women's rights in the early 1900s.

Mace spoke to groups outside the Shaker community that she believed shared some of the Shaker philosophy. Notably, she spoke to a Baháʼí Faith audience in Eliot, Maine in July, 1904.

Mace gained notoriety in the summer of 1900, when a lost and bedraggled eighty-eight year old Charles Lewis Tiffany arrived at her community looking for a glass of water. Assuming he was a tramp, Mace gave him lemonade, brushed off his clothes, insisted he join her for the noon meal, and sent him away with a large boxed lunch and best wishes that he find work. Several days later, Tiffany sent her a thank you note along with a set of silver spoons, forks, and knives engraved with her name and a thank you note. This story was later published.

Mace died on March 30, 1910, at Sabbathday Lake. Although most Shakers were buried plainly, Mace's last request was that her body be embalmed. Her casket was surrounded by floral tributes from friends.

== Theology and views ==
Mace ardently believed in the Shaker view that God was both male and female. She described the female aspect of Deity as the "infinite mother" and creator of "the beautiful things".

Mace was disappointed by the general Shaker reluctance to reflect Ann Lee's concept of equality between the genders. She viewed female participation in science and the government reflected Lee's work.

In her writings, Mace focused on Lee's principles. She also tried to revive older Shaker portrayals of Lee as powerful and divine.

While Mace held the typical Shaker focus on the Christ spirit, she separated Jesus and Christ. She believed that Jesus had "gained the Spirit of Christ by his good works," and referred to "Buddha the Christ", Socrates, "Plato the Christ", and Tolstoy as others the Christ spirit had descended upon. While Mace listed Lee as the first female manifestation of the Christ spirit, she described a common spirit that fused Christ, Lee, and all believers.

With the other Alethians, Mace spoke for tolerance and freedom of thought. The Alethians urged that the Shakers change their name to the Alethians to reflect their understanding of the Christ Consciousness's manifestation on earth.
