= Arnold Hadd =

American shaker (born 1956)

- Born: October 8, 1956 (age 70); Springfield, Massachusetts, U.S.

Religious life
- Religion: Christianity
- Denomination: Shaker

Arnold Hadd (born October 8, 1956) is a Shaker at Sabbathday Lake Shaker Village. He is one of two remaining Shakers.

== Biography ==
Hadd was born on October 8, 1956, in Springfield, Massachusetts. He was introduced to the Shakers by his grandmother who lived nearby Shaker Ricardo Belden. The first time he visited a Shaker village was at Hancock Shaker Village with his parents as a teenager. Hadd first contacted the Shakers at Sabbathday Lake in 1972 and visited in 1974. He was admitted to the Church Family there in 1978 at age 21.

Hadd performs various roles at Sabbathday Lake including writer, historian, gardener, housekeeper and cook, as well as being the head of the village and the Shaker religion. He recorded eighteen Shaker songs and hymns in 2026 for the Derek Piotr Fieldwork Archive.
