= Umbrella stand =

Storage device for umbrellas and walking sticks

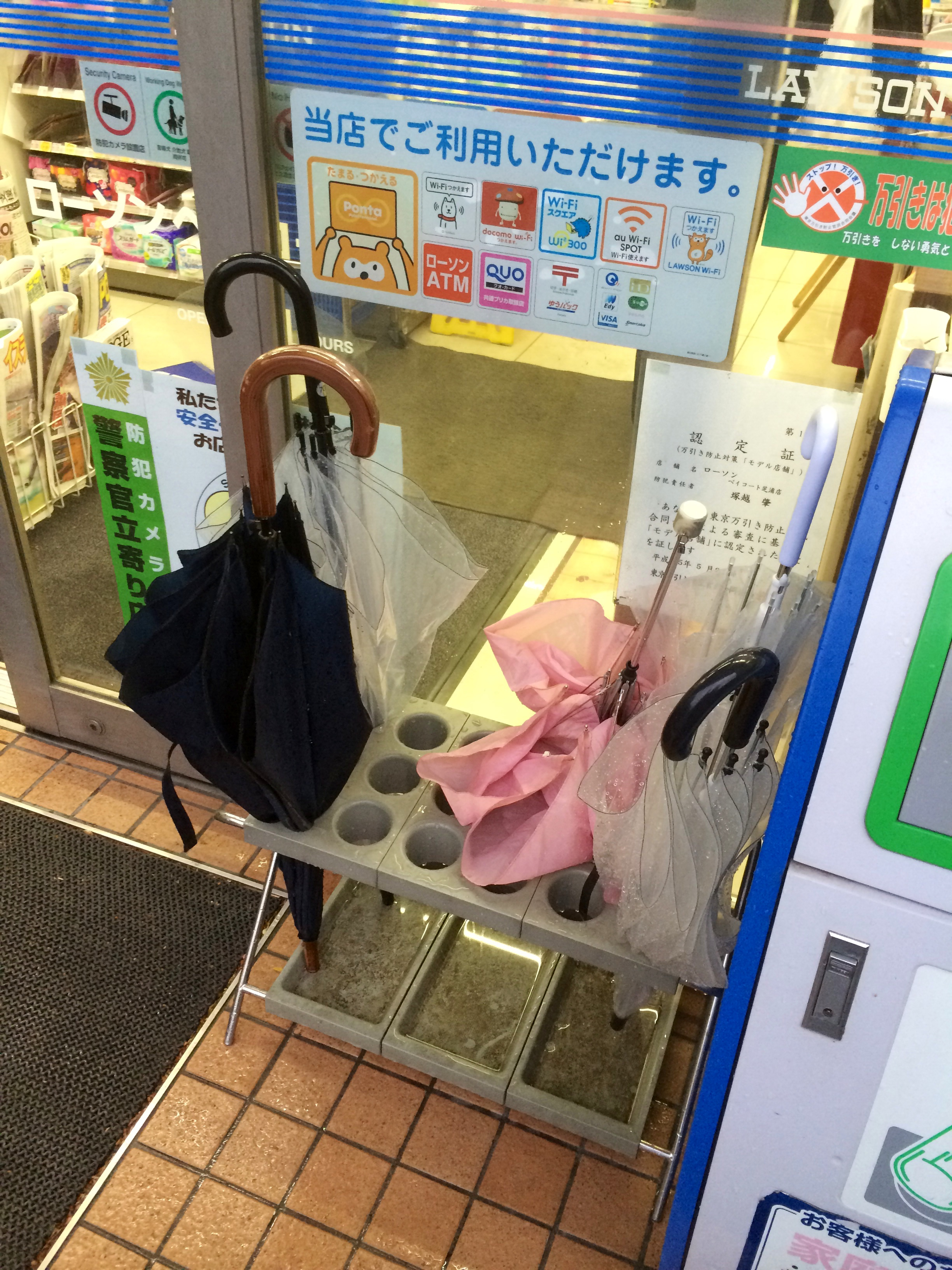
Umbrella holder outside a store

An umbrella stand is a storage device for umbrellas and walking sticks. They are usually located inside the entrance of a home or public building, and are sometimes complemented by a hanger or mirror, or combined with a coat rack.

The stand is used to hold umbrellas when they are not in use. In public spaces, their use is usually limited to rainy days when employees and visitors need to carry umbrellas. Umbrellas can be closed and placed in the stand. They are usually dropped off upon entering the building and collected when leaving the building. This is useful because wet umbrellas may cause a wet floor, which could pose a hazard of slipping.

== Design ==
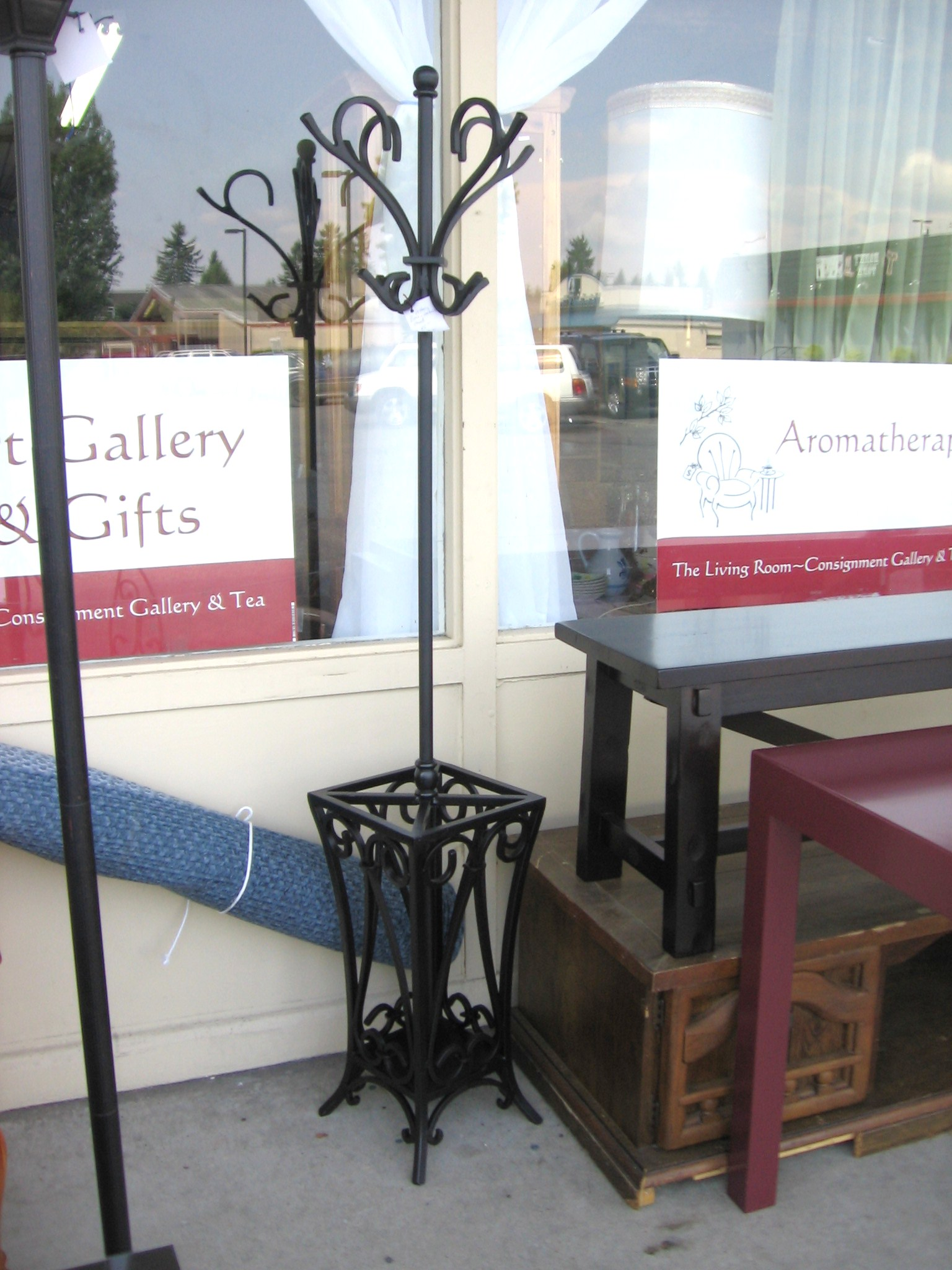
Household coat rack with umbrella stand in the base

A domestic umbrella stand is generally an upright container, often a cylindrical tube, stored near to the entrance of a house. In addition to acting as a functional piece of furniture, they can be aesthetic objects for decoration, and are manufactured from a wide variety of materials: clay, plastic, metal, and wood.

Stands in public buildings are often designed to hold greater numbers of umbrellas, and may be constructed with separate spaces for each umbrella. Stands with locks are used in Japan, to protect umbrellas from thieves.

== Bag dispensers ==
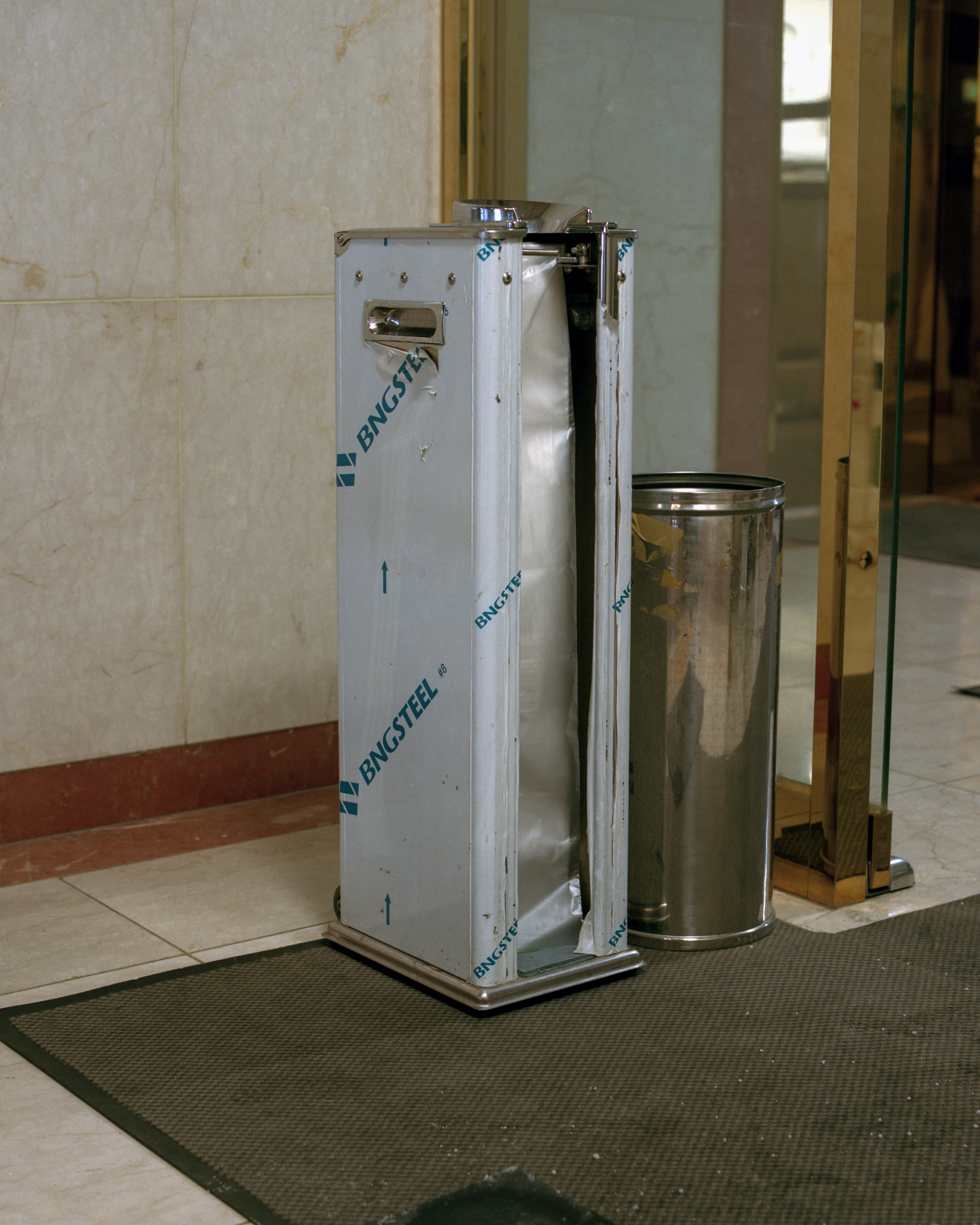
Umbrella bag dispenser in front of the entrance.

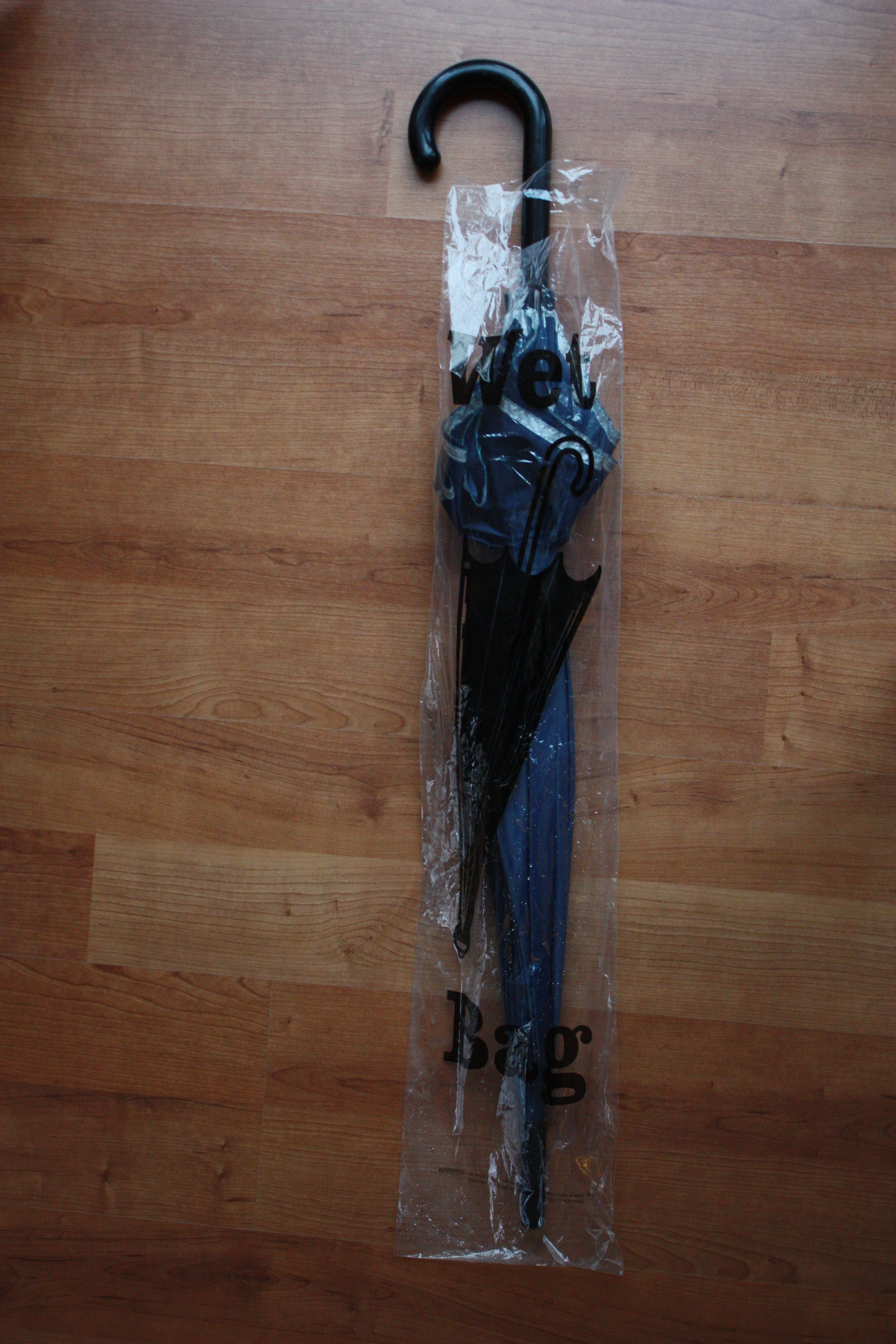
An umbrella bag in use

A more recent variant of the umbrella stand used in modern retailers is the umbrella bag dispenser, which allows the user to insert the umbrella into a disposable waterproof bag when entering a building, and to carry that bag with them so as not to get the floors wet. This eliminates the need for a large umbrella stand, in buildings where storage space may be at a premium.
