= Ethel Hudson =

American shaker

Ethel Hudson (June 4, 1896, Salem, Massachusetts – September 7, 1992, Concord, New Hampshire) was the last surviving member of the Canterbury Shaker Village in New Hampshire. Ethel Hudson was 11 years old when, in 1907, she and her older sister, Elizabeth, left a broken home in Salem, Massachusetts, and traveled by train and horse-drawn carriage to be raised and educated by the Shakers. Elizabeth left when she was 20, but Hudson stayed on as a member of the community.

After Eldress Bertha Lindsay died in 1990, Hudson became the last Canterbury Shaker. Hudson died in 1992, the 200th anniversary year of the founding of the Canterbury Shaker community. The United States has only one Shaker community with members that are living. It is in New Gloucester, Maine.
