= Shaker families =

Family name

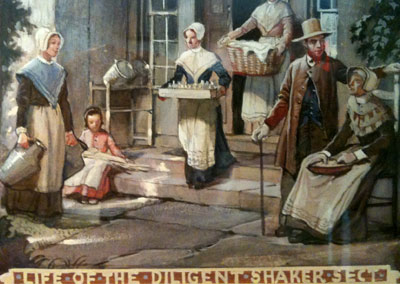
Life of the Diligent Shaker, Shaker Historical Society

Shaker families were groups of followers within Shaker communities.

Each Shaker community was made up of two or more families consisting of as few as a handful of people to as many as 150. When early Shaker communities were first organized, the Church Family was the first to form. Church Families at the larger Shaker communities, such as Canterbury Shaker Village and Watervliet Shaker Village, quickly grew too large and needed to be divided. This led to the creation of First, Second, and Third Families within the Church Family, also referred to as "Orders of the Church". The Orders also sometimes assumed other named such as Center Family, Middle Family, and Brick Family.

Families formed outside of the Church Family were referred to as "the Order of Families" and were originally named for the owner of the land that they occupied, such as John Talcott's Family at Hancock Shaker Village. In 1800, when all Shaker villages were reorganized, each family within the Order of Families was renamed to a cardinal direction based on their location relative to the Church Family. After the reorganization, one family within the Order of Families was designated as the Novitiate or Gathering Order. These families served as a system for those interested in becoming Shakers to enter the community. Members of the Gathering Order would be transferred to other families or communities after accepting the faith and assimilating to Shaker life.

Each family was governed by two men (elders) and two women (eldresses). Communities in close proximity formed bishoprics, and each bishopric was led by a ministry also consisting of two men and two women.

Shaker men and women lived in the families together as brothers and sisters, though the two intentionally did not closely associate and minimized contact. Members of families ate together, worshipped together, and carried out chores together, however the two sexes ate at different tables, had separate stairways and bedrooms, and performed different tasks based on their sex. Still, men and women were considered equal among the Shakers.
