= Canterbury, New Hampshire =

Town in New Hampshire, United States

- Town
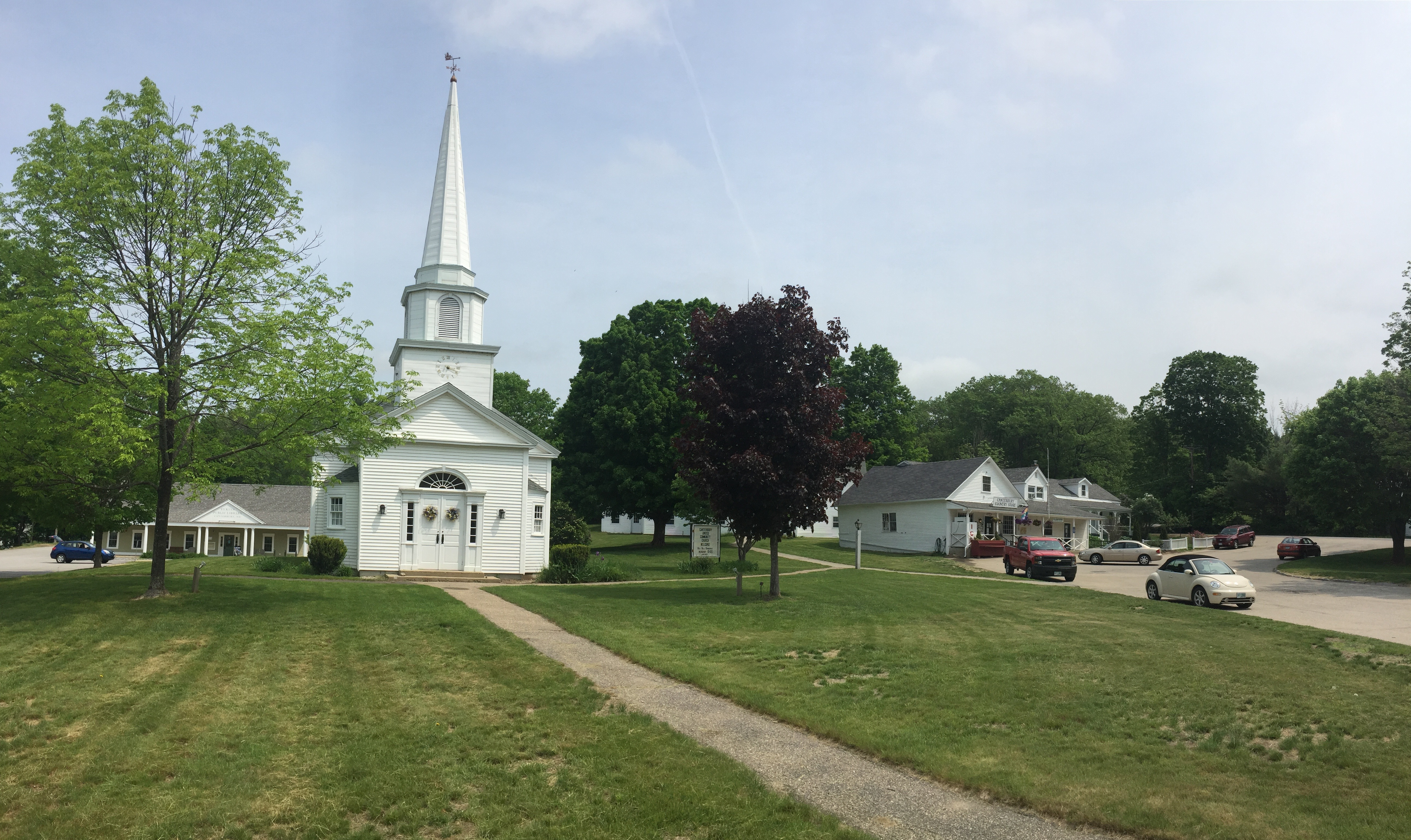
- Town center: Canterbury United Community Church (L) & Country Store (R)

- Seal

- Location in Merrimack County and the state of New Hampshire
- Coordinates: 43°20′13″N 71°33′55″W
- Country: United States
- State: New Hampshire
- County: Merrimack
- Incorporated: 1741
- Villages: Canterbury; Canterbury Station; Shaker Village

Area
  - Total: 44.71 sq mi (115.79 km^{2})
  - Land: 43.88 sq mi (113.64 km^{2})
  - Water: 0.83 sq mi (2.15 km^{2}) 1.86%
- Elevation: 801 ft (244 m)

Population (2020)
  - Total: 2,389
  - Density: 54/sq mi (21/km^{2})
- Time zone: UTC-5 (Eastern)
  - Summer (DST): UTC-4 (Eastern)
- ZIP code: 03224
- Area code: 603
- FIPS code: 33-09860
- GNIS feature ID: 873559
- Website: www.canterburynh.gov

Canterbury is a town in Merrimack County, New Hampshire, United States. The population was 2,389 at the 2020 census. The Canterbury Shaker Village is in the eastern part of the town.

== History ==
First granted by Lieutenant Governor John Wentworth in 1727, the town was named for William Wake, Archbishop of Canterbury. It was originally a militia timber fort and trading post of Capt. Jeremiah Clough located on a hill near Canterbury Center, where the Pennacook people came to trade. The town would be incorporated in 1741. There were several garrison houses or stockades in the area as late as 1758.

== Geography ==
According to the United States Census Bureau, the town has a total area of 44.7 square miles (115.8 km^{2}), of which 43.9 square miles (113.6 km^{2}) are land and 0.81 square miles (2.1 km^{2}) are water, comprising 1.86% of the town. The town's highest point is an unnamed summit near Forest Pond and the town's northern border, where the elevation reaches approximately 1,390 feet (420 m) above sea level. Bounded by the Merrimack River on the west, Canterbury is drained on the east by the Soucook River. Canterbury lies fully within the Merrimack River watershed.

=== Adjacent municipalities ===
- Northfield (north)
- Gilmanton (northeast)
- Loudon (east)
- Concord (south)
- Boscawen (west)

== Demographics ==
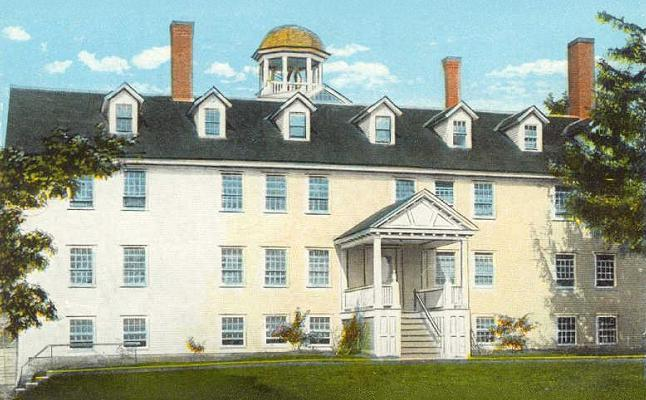
Shakers' dwelling c. 1920

Historical population
Census	Pop.	Note	%±
1790	1,038		—
1800	1,114		7.3%
1810	1,526		37.0%
1820	1,696		11.1%
1830	1,663		−1.9%
1840	1,643		−1.2%
1850	1,614		−1.8%
1860	1,522		−5.7%
1870	1,169		−23.2%
1880	1,033		−11.6%
1890	964		−6.7%
1900	821		−14.8%
1910	680		−17.2%
1920	655		−3.7%
1930	505		−22.9%
1940	659		30.5%
1950	627		−4.9%
1960	674		7.5%
1970	895		32.8%
1980	1,410		57.5%
1990	1,687		19.6%
2000	1,979		17.3%
2010	2,352		18.8%
2020	2,389		1.6%
U.S. Decennial Census

As of the census of 2000, there were 1,979 people, 749 households, and 590 families residing in the town. The population density was 45.1 inhabitants per square mile (17.4/km^{2}). There were 838 housing units at an average density of 19.1 per square mile (7.4/km^{2}). The racial makeup of the town was 98.59% White, 0.25% African American, 0.25% Asian, 0.05% Pacific Islander, 0.10% from other races, and 0.76% from two or more races. Hispanic or Latino of any race were 0.51% of the population.

There were 749 households, out of which 33.9% had children under the age of 18 living with them, 67.0% were married couples living together, 7.7% had a female householder with no husband present, and 21.2% were non-families. 15.1% of all households were made up of individuals, and 4.9% had someone living alone who was 65 years of age or older. The average household size was 2.64 and the average family size was 2.91.

In the town, the population was spread out, with 24.5% under the age of 18, 4.9% from 18 to 24, 25.6% from 25 to 44, 34.8% from 45 to 64, and 10.4% who were 65 years of age or older. The median age was 42 years. For every 100 females, there were 93.3 males. For every 100 females age 18 and over, there were 93.4 males.

The median income for a household in the town was $58,026, and the median income for a family was $62,583. Males had a median income of $41,302 versus $32,313 for females. The per capita income for the town was $27,374. About 2.0% of families and 2.5% of the population were below the poverty line, including 1.7% of those under age 18 and 2.0% of those age 65 or over.

== Arts and culture ==
=== Annual cultural events ===
On the last Saturday in July, the town hosts the annual Canterbury Fair, which includes artisan performances, music performances and a 5K run.

The town hosts a regular Fourth of July parade as well a fireworks show by the town fire department.

=== Tourism ===
The biggest attraction in Canterbury is the Shaker Village, established in 1792. At its peak in the 1850s, over 300 people lived, worked and worshiped in 100 buildings on 4,000 acres (16 km^{2}). They made their living by farming, selling seeds, herbs and herbal medicines; and by manufacturing textiles, pails, brooms and other products. The last resident, Sister Ethel Hudson, died in 1992, and the site is now a museum, founded in 1969, to preserve the heritage of the utopian sect. Canterbury Shaker Village is an internationally known, non-profit historic site with 25 original Shaker buildings, four reconstructed Shaker buildings and 694 acres (2.81 km^{2}) of forest, fields, gardens and mill ponds under permanent conservation easement. It has been designated a National Historic Landmark for its architectural integrity and significance.

Canterbury has an active historical society hosting events throughout the year and maintaining the Elizabeth Houser Museum in the old Center Schoolhouse (original one-room school house) as well as an archive of Canterbury-related materials dating to the early 18th century. Among notable works in the archive are the Lunther Cody Collection of Glass Negatives, documenting classic life in New England.

== Parks and recreation ==
Canterbury is home to Ayers State Forest and Shaker State Forest. Ayers State Forest covers 50 acres (20 ha), and Shaker State Forest is 226.5 acres (91.7 ha).

== Notable people ==
- Abiel Foster (1735–1806), US congressman, representative in the Continental Congress
- Stephen Symonds Foster (1809–1881), radical abolitionist
- Charles G. Haines (1792–1825), Adjutant General of New York
- Joseph M. Harper (1787–1865), US congressman, Acting Governor of New Hampshire
- Dudley Laufman (1931–2026), musician and contra dance caller
- Kenneth MacKenna (1899–1962), actor, film director
- Colby James West (born 1985), freestyle skier

== Gallery ==
Images of Canterbury:

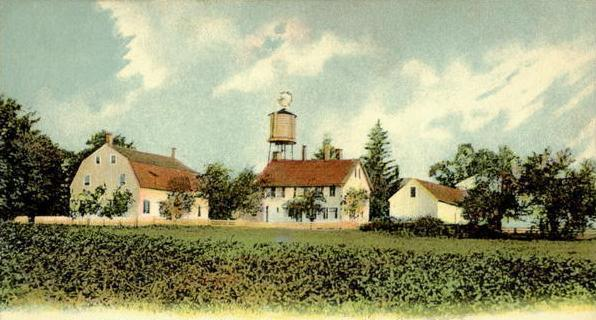
Canterbury Shaker Village c. 1906

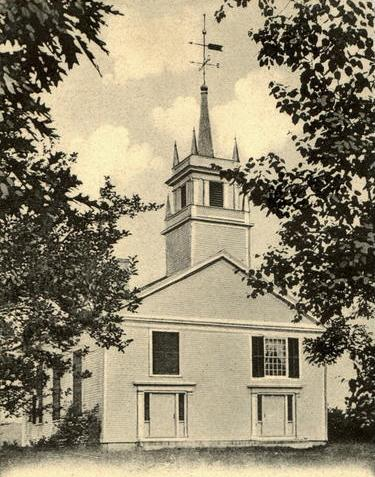
Worsted Church c. 1906

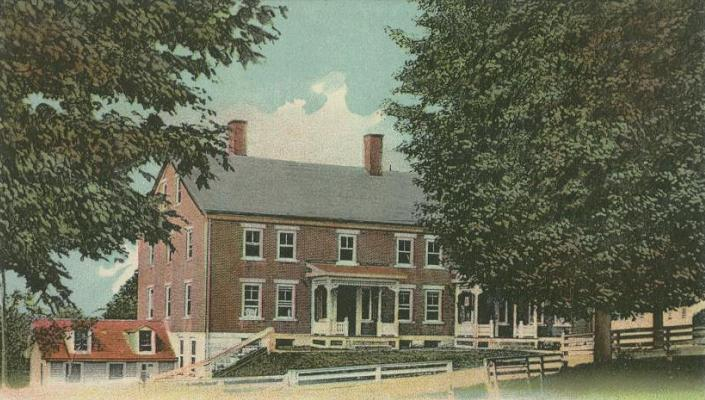
Shakers' office c. 1905

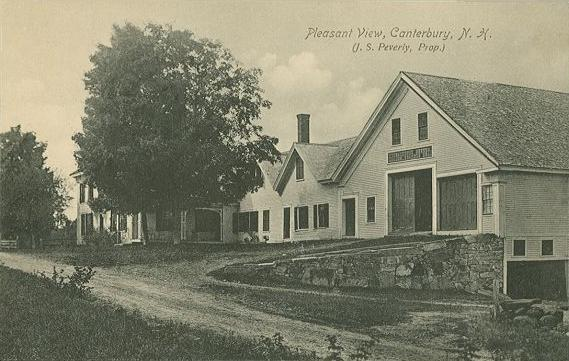
Pleasant View Inn c. 1910

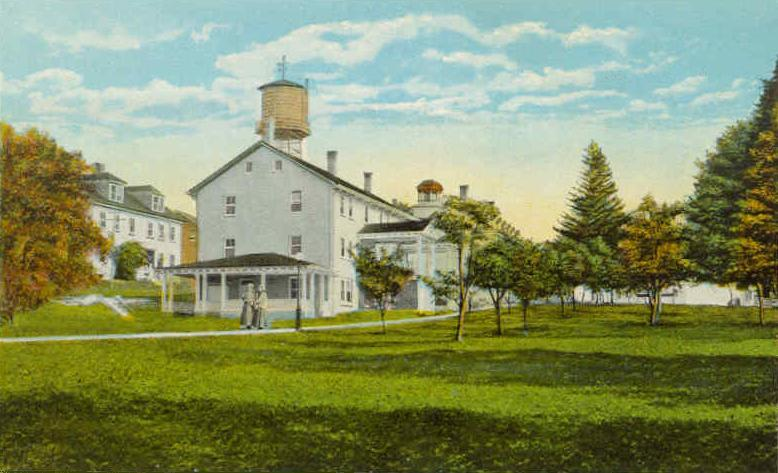
Shaker Village c. 1920

== See also ==
- New Hampshire Historical Marker No. 283: The 'Worsted' Church
